= Orange, New Hampshire =

- Town
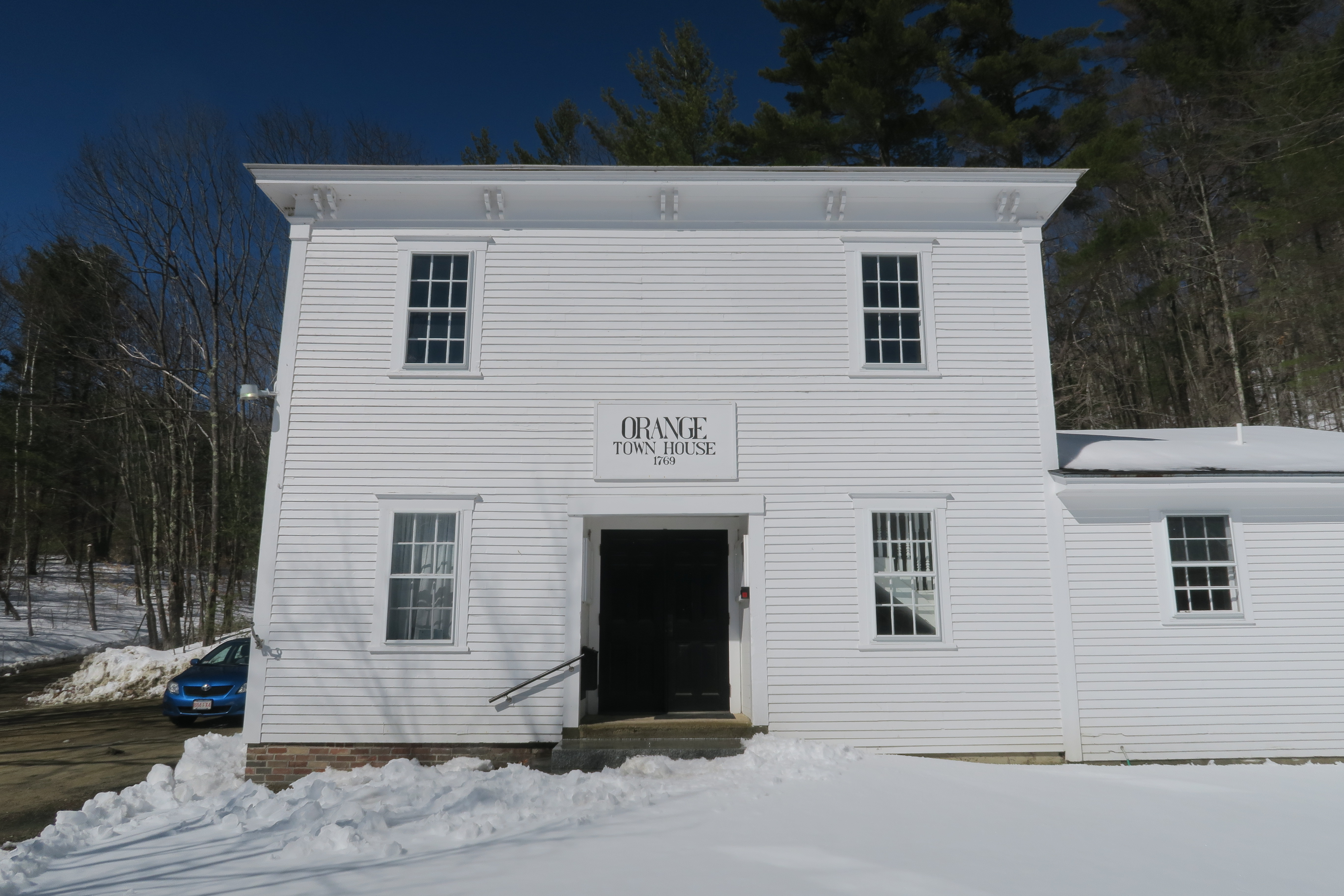
- Orange Town House

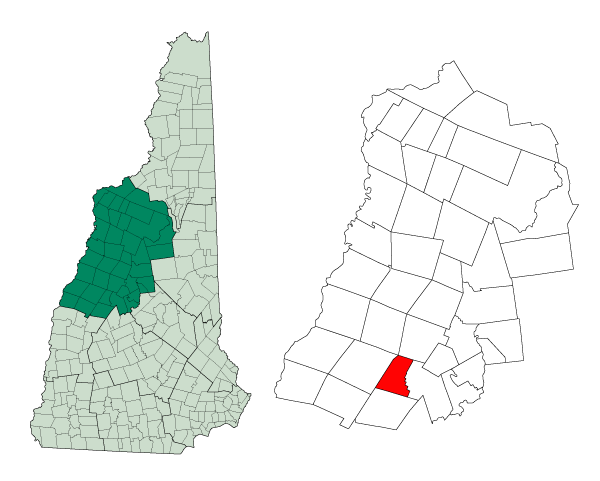
- Location in Grafton County, New Hampshire
- Coordinates: 43°39′14″N 71°56′17″W
- Country: United States
- State: New Hampshire
- County: Grafton
- Incorporated: 1790

Area
  - Total: 23.1 sq mi (59.9 km^{2})
  - Land: 23.1 sq mi (59.7 km^{2})
  - Water: 0.077 sq mi (0.2 km^{2}) 0.25%
- Elevation: 1,877 ft (572 m)

Population (2020)
  - Total: 277
  - Density: 12/sq mi (4.6/km^{2})
- Time zone: UTC-5 (Eastern)
  - Summer (DST): UTC-4 (Eastern)
- ZIP code: 03741
- Area code: 603
- FIPS code: 33-58340
- GNIS feature ID: 873692
- Website: orangenh.us

Orange is a town in Grafton County, New Hampshire, United States. The population was 277 at the 2020 census, down from 331 at the 2010 census.

== History ==
Orange was granted in 1769 and incorporated in 1790. It was originally named "Cardigan", after George Brudenell, fourth Earl of Cardigan. The Cardigan name lives on with Mount Cardigan and Cardigan Mountain State Park. After the American Revolution, voters attempted to rename the town "Bradford", "Middletown", "Liscomb", and finally "Orange". The large quantities of yellow-orange ochre found in Mount Cardigan may have been the source of the name Orange.

== Geography ==
According to the United States Census Bureau, the town has a total area of 23.1 square miles (59.9 km^{2}), of which 23.1 square miles (59.7 km^{2}) are land and 0.1 square miles (0.2 km^{2}) are water, comprising 0.25% of the town. The highest point in Orange is the summit of Mount Cardigan, at 3,155 feet (962 m) above sea level, near the eastern edge of the town.

The western side of the town (and the mountain) drains via Orange Brook to the Indian River in the neighboring town of Canaan, in turn a tributary of the Mascoma River. This portion of town is part of the Connecticut River watershed. The remainder of the town is part of the Merrimack River watershed. In the northern part of town, the South Branch of the Baker River has its source, flowing north toward Groton and Dorchester. The northeastern corner of the town drains north via Atwell Brook to the Cockermouth River in Groton, a tributary of Newfound Lake. The eastern edge of town drains off Mount Cardigan via several brooks leading to the Fowler River in Alexandria, another tributary of Newfound Lake. The southeastern part of town drains to Mill Brook, a southward-flowing tributary of the Smith River. The Baker River, Newfound Lake, and the Smith River are all tributaries of the Pemigewasset River, which flows south to form the Merrimack River in Franklin.

U.S. Route 4 passes through the town's southwestern corner.

== Demographics ==
Historical population
Census	Pop.	Note	%±
1790	131		—
1800	203		55.0%
1810	229		12.8%
1820	293		27.9%
1830	405		38.2%
1840	463		14.3%
1850	451		−2.6%
1860	382		−15.3%
1870	340		−11.0%
1880	335		−1.5%
1890	245		−26.9%
1900	213		−13.1%
1910	176		−17.4%
1920	166		−5.7%
1930	99		−40.4%
1940	109		10.1%
1950	82		−24.8%
1960	83		1.2%
1970	103		24.1%
1980	197		91.3%
1990	237		20.3%
2000	299		26.2%
2010	331		10.7%
2020	277		−16.3%
U.S. Decennial Census

As of the census of 2000, there were 299 people, 111 households, and 85 families living in the town. The population density was 12.9 people per square mile (5.0/km^{2}). There were 134 housing units at an average density of 5.8 per square mile (2.2/km^{2}). The racial makeup of the town was 99.67% White and 0.33% Asian. Hispanic or Latino of any race were 0.33% of the population.

There were 111 households, out of which 33.3% had children under the age of 18 living with them, 59.5% were married couples living together, 8.1% had a female householder with no husband present, and 23.4% were non-families. 15.3% of all households were made up of individuals, and 4.5% had someone living alone who was 65 years of age or older. The average household size was 2.69 and the average family size was 2.98.

In the town, the population was spread out, with 25.1% under the age of 18, 5.0% from 18 to 24, 35.5% from 25 to 44, 25.1% from 45 to 64, and 9.4% who were 65 years of age or older. The median age was 38 years. For every 100 females, there were 110.6 males. For every 100 females age 18 and over, there were 103.6 males.

The median income for a household in the town was $41,250, and the median income for a family was $40,625. Males had a median income of $34,750 versus $25,938 for females. The per capita income for the town was $17,456. About 6.3% of families and 6.6% of the population were below the poverty line, including 6.0% of those under the age of eighteen and 3.2% of those 65 or over.

As of May 31, 2016, there were 225 registered voters on the checklist, including 55 Republican, 53 Democrat and 117 undeclared.
