= Alexandria, New Hampshire =

- Town
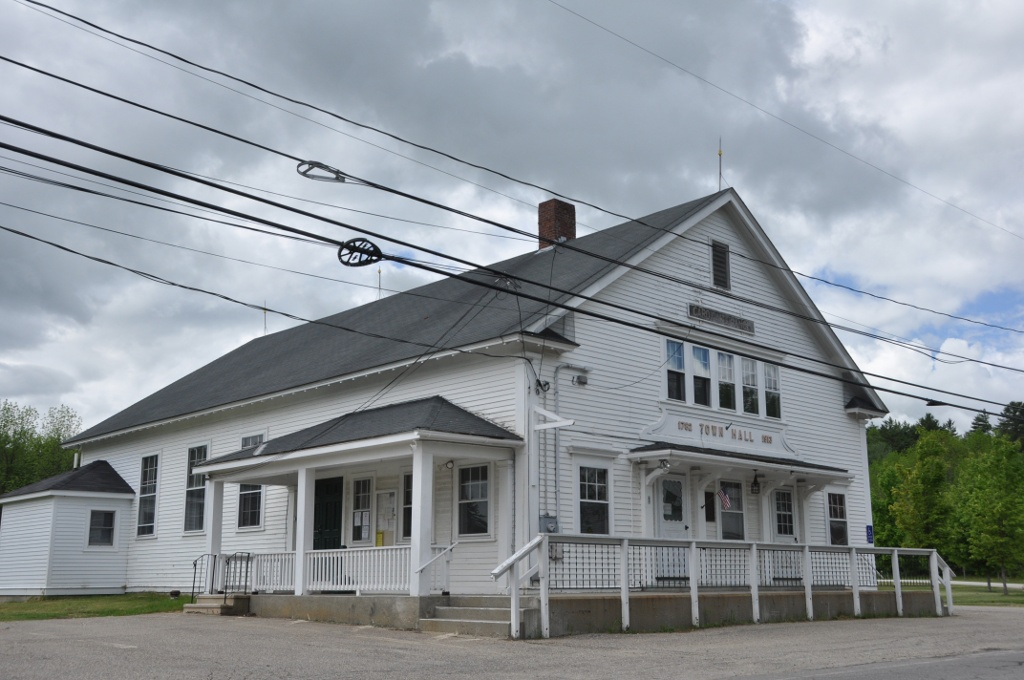
- Historic town hall

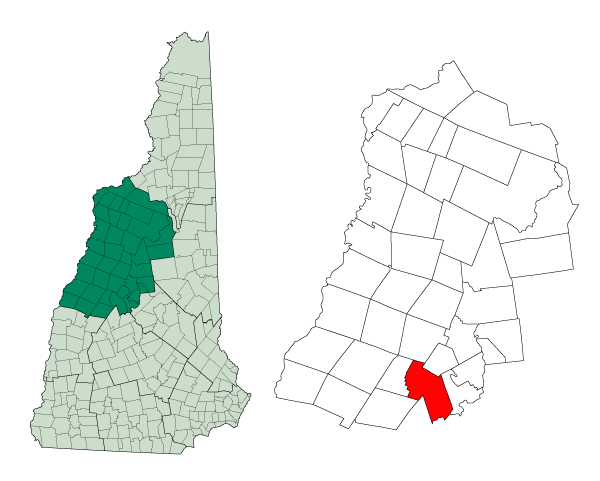
- Location in Grafton County, New Hampshire
- Coordinates: 43°37′55″N 71°51′12″W
- Country: United States
- State: New Hampshire
- County: Grafton
- Incorporated: 1782

Area
  - Total: 43.4 sq mi (112.3 km^{2})
  - Land: 43.2 sq mi (111.8 km^{2})
  - Water: 0.19 sq mi (0.5 km^{2}) 0.47%
- Elevation: 1,460 ft (450 m)

Population (2020)
  - Total: 1,776
  - Density: 41/sq mi (15.9/km^{2})
- Time zone: UTC-5 (Eastern)
  - Summer (DST): UTC-4 (Eastern)
- ZIP codes: 03222 (Bristol/Alexandria); 03243 (Hill)
- Area code: 603
- FIPS code: 33-00580
- GNIS feature ID: 873527
- Website: www.alexandrianh.com

Alexandria is a town in Grafton County, New Hampshire, United States. The population was 1,776 at the 2020 census, up from 1,613 at the 2010 census. Newfound Lake is in the northeast corner, with Wellington State Park on the western shore. The town is home to Welton Falls State Forest. Cardigan Mountain State Park, with Mount Cardigan, is in the west.

== History ==
Granted in 1753 by the Masonian Proprietors, the town was named for Alexandria, Virginia, location of a 1755 conference of governors early in the French and Indian War. Alexandria was granted to Joseph Butterfield and others, March 13, 1757. First settled in 1769 by John Moore Corliss and his brother Jonathan, it was incorporated by the New Hampshire General Court on November 23, 1782. Danbury was set off and incorporated in 1795.

Although farmers found parts of the terrain mountainous, other parts were level intervales suited for cultivation. By 1859, when the population was 1,273, agriculture was a chief occupation. The town also had a carriage maker, nine sawmills and three gristmills.

Alexandria was the birthplace of Luther C. Ladd (1843–1861), the first enlisted soldier to lose his life in the Civil War, shot during the Baltimore Riot. Also born here was Louise Lamprey (1869–1951), prolific author of books for children. Today, the town is home to Cardigan Lodge, the Appalachian Mountain Club facility at the base of Mount Cardigan.

== Geography ==
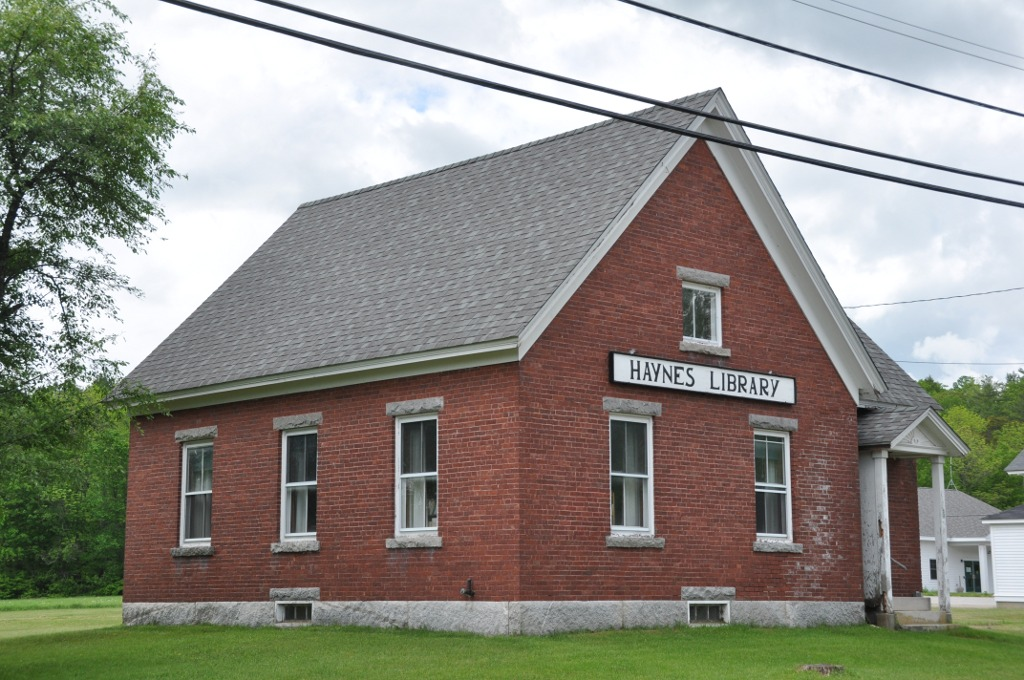
Haynes Library

Alexandria is in central New Hampshire, along the southern border of Grafton County. According to the U.S. Census Bureau, the town has a total area of 43.4 square miles (112.3 km^{2}), of which 43.2 square miles (111.8 km^{2}) are land and 0.19 square miles (0.5 km^{2}) are water, comprising 0.47% of the town. Alexandria is drained by the Fowler River, an east-flowing tributary of Newfound Lake. The Smith River forms part of the southern border of the town. All water bodies in the town eventually flow to the Pemigewasset River, part of the Merrimack River watershed. Mount Cardigan, elevation 3,121 feet (951 m), is on the western boundary of the town. The summit is in the town of Orange, while the highest point in Alexandria is on the Firescrew ridge to the north, where the elevation reaches 3,040 ft (930 m).

=== Climate ===
Climate data for Alexandria, New Hampshire(coordinates:43.6333°N 71.8000°W, 1991-2020 precipitation normals)
Month	Jan	Feb	Mar	Apr	May	Jun	Jul	Aug	Sep	Oct	Nov	Dec	Year
Average precipitation inches (mm)	3.69 (94)	3.35 (85)	4.35 (110)	4.18 (106)	4.26 (108)	4.40 (112)	4.40 (112)	4.77 (121)	4.53 (115)	5.90 (150)	4.74 (120)	5.15 (131)	53.72 (1,364)
Average precipitation days (≥ 0.01 in)	12.0	10.2	12.6	10.8	13.7	13.6	12.2	11.2	10.5	11.6	11.3	13.4	143.1
Source: NOAA

== Demographics ==
Historical population
Census	Pop.	Note	%±
1790	298		—
1800	303		1.7%
1810	409		35.0%
1820	707		72.9%
1830	1,083		53.2%
1840	1,284		18.6%
1850	1,273		−0.9%
1860	1,253		−1.6%
1870	876		−30.1%
1880	828		−5.5%
1890	679		−18.0%
1900	630		−7.2%
1910	571		−9.4%
1920	502		−12.1%
1930	412		−17.9%
1940	396		−3.9%
1950	402		1.5%
1960	370		−8.0%
1970	466		25.9%
1980	706		51.5%
1990	1,190		68.6%
2000	1,329		11.7%
2010	1,613		21.4%
2020	1,776		10.1%
U.S. Decennial Census

As of the census of 2000, there were 1,329 people, 504 households, and 386 families residing in the town. The population density was 30.9 inhabitants per square mile (11.9/km^{2}). There were 783 housing units at an average density of 18.2 per square mile (7.0/km^{2}). The racial makeup of the town was 97.82% White, 0.08% African American, 0.30% Native American, 0.38% Asian, and 1.43% from two or more races. Hispanic or Latino of any race were 0.23% of the population.

There were 504 households, out of which 31.5% had children under the age of 18 living with them, 64.7% were married couples living together, 7.5% had a female householder with no husband present, and 23.4% were non-families. 16.9% of all households were made up of individuals, and 6.0% had someone living alone who was 65 years of age or older. The average household size was 2.64 and the average family size was 2.94.

In the town, the population was spread out, with 25.0% under the age of 18, 4.7% from 18 to 24, 31.0% from 25 to 44, 28.0% from 45 to 64, and 11.3% who were 65 years of age or older. The median age was 40 years. For every 100 females, there were 99.3 males. For every 100 females age 18 and over, there were 99.8 males.

The median income for a household in the town was $42,667, and the median income for a family was $45,938. Males had a median income of $31,367 versus $25,163 for females. The per capita income for the town was $19,323. About 4.7% of families and 6.3% of the population were below the poverty line, including 9.0% of those under age 18 and none of those age 65 or over.

== Education ==
Alexandria is within the Newfound Area School District. The district's secondary schools are Newfound Memorial Middle School, and Newfound Regional High School in Bristol.
