= Mount Cardigan =

Mountain in New Hampshire, United States

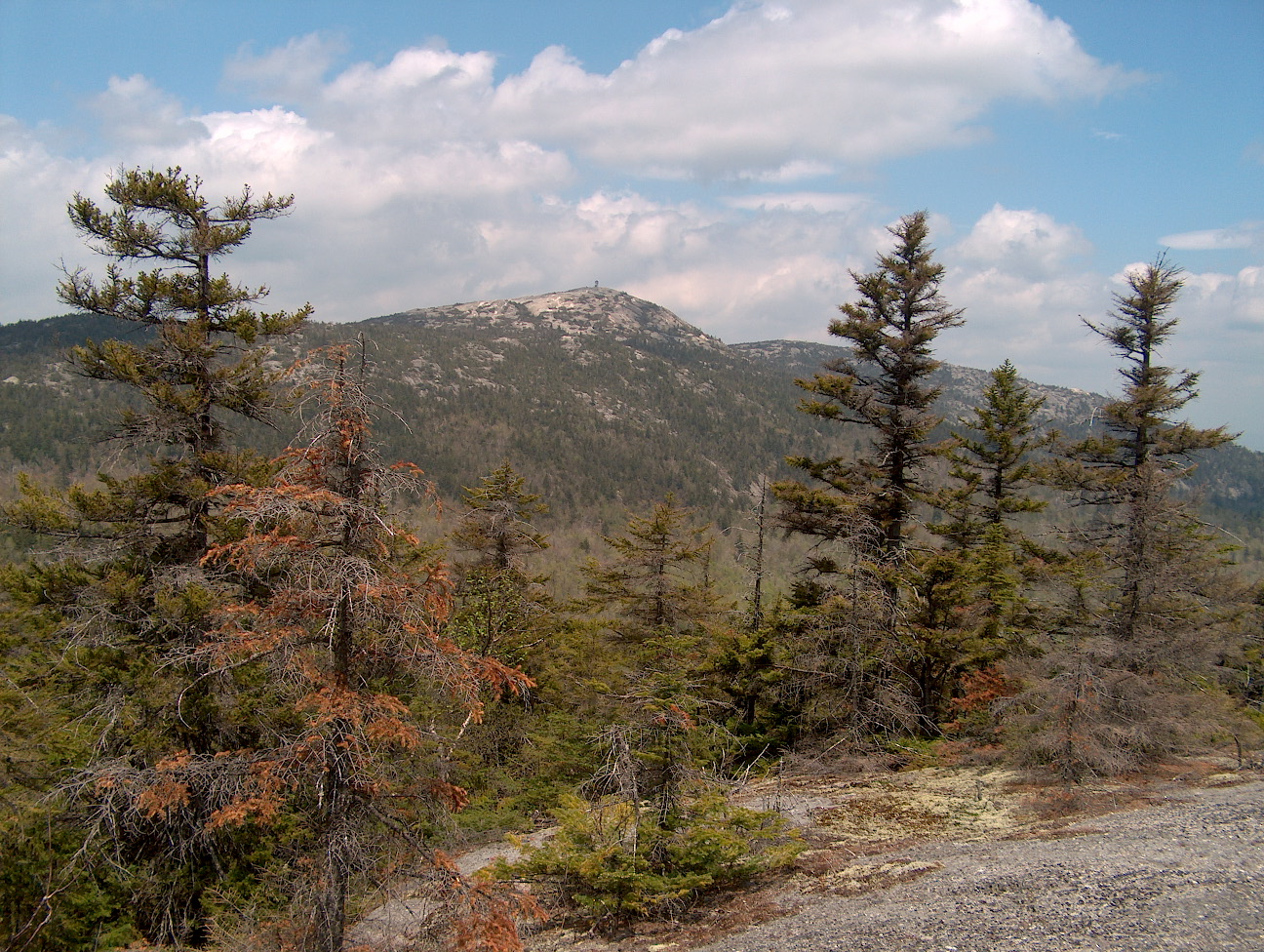
- Mount Cardigan from the south

Highest point
- Elevation: 3,155 ft (962 m)
- Prominence: 1,925 ft (587 m)
- Coordinates: 43°38′59″N 71°54′53″W

Geography
- Location within New Hampshire
- Location: Orange / Alexandria, New Hampshire, U.S.
- Topo map: USGS Mount Cardigan

Climbing
- Easiest route: West Ridge Trail

Mount Cardigan is a prominent bare-rock summit in the towns of Orange and Alexandria in western New Hampshire, United States. While its peak is only 3,155 feet (962 m) above sea level, it has extensive areas of bare granite ledges and alpine scrub, giving it the feel to hikers of a much higher mountain. Most of the summit area was denuded by devastating forest fires in 1855.

The Civilian Conservation Corps helped develop the alpine ski trail network, still used today on the mountain's east side.

The mountain is in the 5,655-acre (22.88 km^{2}) Cardigan Mountain State Park.

The Cardigan Lodge, operated by the Appalachian Mountain Club since 1934, is located to the east at the foot of the mountain and is often used as a base for day hikes in and around the mountain. Many schools from around New England have overnight field trips to the mountain during the autumn and spring.. The mountain is also a popular destination for Boy Scout troops.

== Geology ==
The bedrock of Mount Cardigan is the upper member of the Lower Devonian Littleton Formation (a light grey meta-turbidite) on its west flank (seen on lower parts of the West Ridge Trail). On the summit and to the east on the Clark Trail, the bedrock is the Kinsman Granodiorite of the Early Devonian Cardigan Pluton (a foliated granitic body with large megacrysts of potassium feldspar). The Cardigan pluton has been dated by the Rb/Sr method at 411 +/- 19 MA. The metamorphic rocks of the Littleton Formation that make up the west flank are at middle amphibolite metamorphic grade. The Littleton Formation rocks were once deep water sediments of the Bronson Hill Island Arc and were deformed and metamorphosed during the Acadian orogeny.

== Hydrology ==
Mount Cardigan lies on the divide between the Connecticut River and Merrimack River watersheds. The western slopes of the mountain drain to Orange Brook towards the town of Canaan, then via the Indian River to the Mascoma River, the Connecticut River, and ultimately Long Island Sound. The south slopes of the mountain flow via Mill Brook to the Smith River, a tributary of the Pemigewasset and Merrimack rivers, ultimately flowing to the Gulf of Maine. The eastern slopes of Mount Cardigan drain via Brock, Clark, and Davis brooks to the Fowler River, then via Newfound Lake and the Newfound River to the Pemigewasset. Atwell Brook flows off a northeastern ridge of the mountain, draining via the Cockermouth River to Newfound Lake. The farthest north ridge of Cardigan is drained by the South Branch of the Baker River, with water flowing north to the Baker River in Rumney before turning east to reach the Pemigewasset in Plymouth.
