= Newfound Area School District =

School district in New Hampshire, United States

Location
- 20 North Main Street; Bristol, New Hampshire 03222; United States; 43°35′30″N 71°44′13″W

Information
- Founded: 1962
- Superintendent: Brian Connelly
- Grades: Pre-K – 12
- Enrollment: 1,171 (2022-23)
- Colors: Green and White
- Mascot: Bears
- Communities served: Alexandria, Bridgewater, Bristol, Danbury, Groton, Hebron, and New Hampton, New Hampshire
- Website: sau4.org

Newfound Area School District, sometimes referred to as School Administrative Unit 4 (SAU 4), is a cooperative school district comprising four towns and spanning three counties in New Hampshire. Headquartered in Bristol, the district also includes the towns of Alexandria, Danbury, and New Hampton.

The district’s former superintendent, Paul Hoiriis, held the position since July 2024, taking over from interim superintendent, Steven Nilhas.. As of July 2026, the superintendent is Brian Connelly.

== School Board ==
The Newfound Area School Board comprises seven members, one representative from each town, who are elected district-wide by ballot on election day. Current members are Melissa Suckling of Danbury (Chair), Kimberly Bliss of Alexandria (Vice Chair), Dominic Halle of Bridgewater, Joseph Maloney of Bristol, William Jolly of Groton, Jennifer Larochelle of Hebron, and Fran Wendleboe of New Hampton.

== Schools ==
Secondary

- Newfound Regional High School
- Newfound Memorial Middle School

Primary

- Bristol Elementary School
- New Hampton Community School
