= Cardigan Pluton =

Geologic formation in New Hampshire, United States

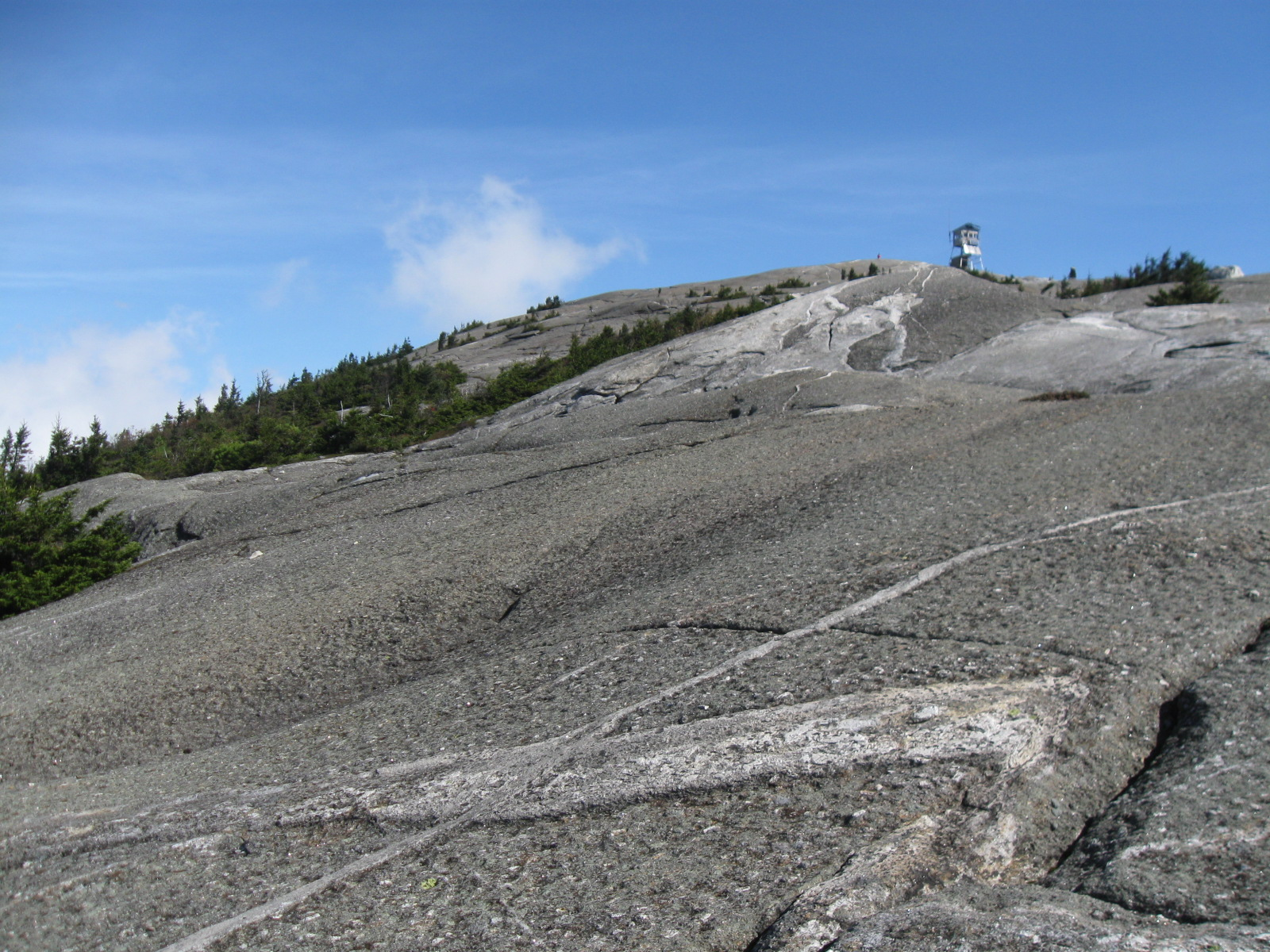
The pluton exposed at the summit of Mount Cardigan

The Cardigan Pluton is the most voluminous pluton in the state of New Hampshire, United States. The onset of magmatism was during the Acadian orogeny, and the pluton is part of the Kinsman suite of the New Hampshire Plutonic Series. The pluton is approximately 20 km (12 mi) wide by 90 km (56 mi) long and on average about 2.5 km (1.6 mi) thick. It is exposed in west-central New Hampshire along a north-northeast by south-southwest axis, extending from the town of Groton in the north to Dublin in the south. Mount Cardigan, from which the pluton is named, stands near the north end.

The pluton ranges in composition from granite to tonalite (S-type) and is likely derived from crustal melting of pelitic rocks. The rocks show foliation indicating they were emplaced early in the Acadian Orogeny and subsequently overprinted by later metamorphic events. Minerals in the Cardigan Pluton include large K-feldspar megacrysts and quartz, plagioclase, muscovite, garnet, biotite, and less abundant minerals including sillimanite, cordierite, ilmenite, graphite, apatite, monazite, zircon, and allanite. The pluton is dated at 411 +/- 19 Ma by the Rb/Sr method.
