= Newfound River =

Newfound River may refer to:

- The Newfound River (New Hampshire)
- The Newfound River (Virginia)

There are also "Newfound Creek" features located in Kentucky, North Carolina and Alabama.
