= Bridgewater, New Hampshire =

- Town
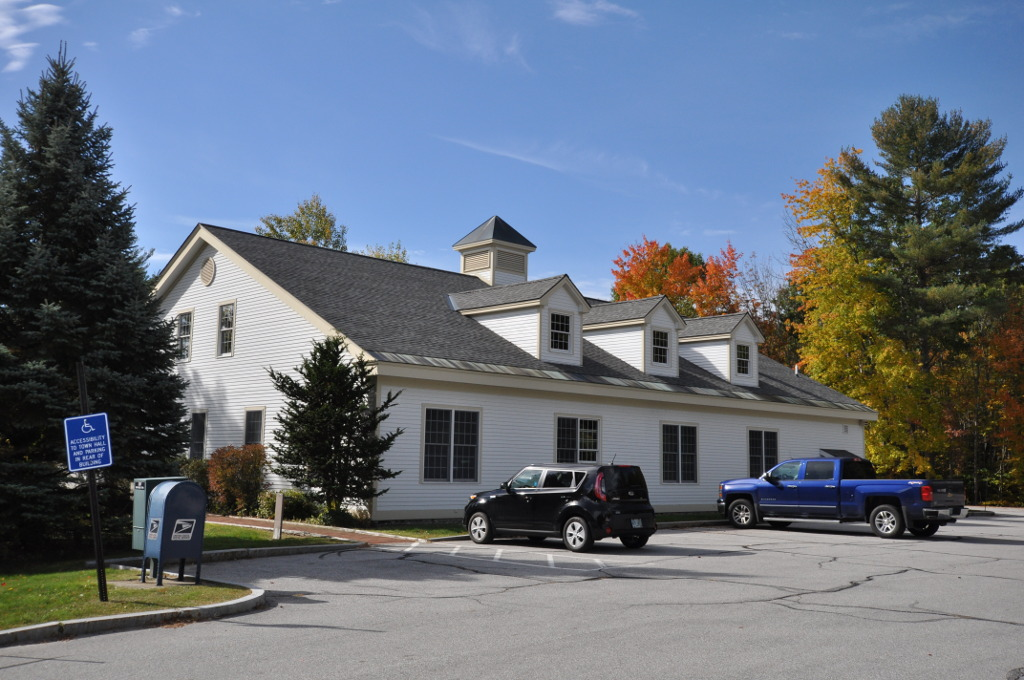
- Town hall

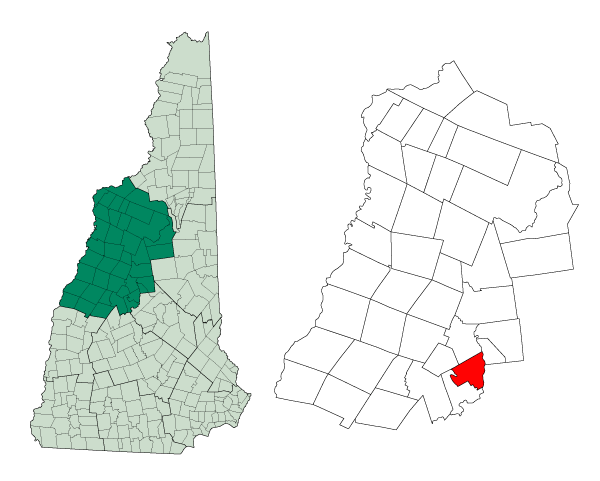
- Location in Grafton County, New Hampshire
- Coordinates: 43°40′05″N 71°41′43″W
- Country: United States
- State: New Hampshire
- County: Grafton
- Incorporated: 1788

Area
  - Total: 21.7 sq mi (56.2 km^{2})
  - Land: 21.5 sq mi (55.7 km^{2})
  - Water: 0.19 sq mi (0.5 km^{2}) 0.97%
- Elevation: 1,693 ft (516 m)

Population (2020)
  - Total: 1,160
  - Density: 54/sq mi (20.8/km^{2})
- Time zone: UTC-5 (Eastern)
  - Summer (DST): UTC-4 (Eastern)
- ZIP Codes: 03222 (Bristol); 03264 (Plymouth)
- Area code: 603
- FIPS code: 33-07540
- GNIS feature ID: 873551
- Website: www.bridgewater-nh.com

Bridgewater is a town in Grafton County, New Hampshire, United States. The population was 1,160 at the 2020 census.

== History ==
The land comprising Bridgewater was originally part of a town known as "New Chester", which was separated into Bridgewater, Bristol, Hill, Danbury, and Wilmot. The town name was chosen because many of the settlers were from Bridgewater, Massachusetts.

Bridgewater originally included all of Bridgewater, Hill and Bristol. It was first settled in 1776, by Thomas Crawford. It was incorporated February 12, 1788.

In 1874, the Bridgewater station was served by the Montreal railroad.

The acclaimed author John Cheever spent many summers here at the home of his father-in-law, Milton Charles Winternitz.

== Geography ==
According to the United States Census Bureau, the town has a total area of 21.7 square miles (56.2 km^{2}), of which 21.5 square miles (55.7 km^{2}) are land and 0.19 square miles (0.5 km^{2}) are water, comprising 0.97% of the town. The highest point in Bridgewater is Peaked Hill, at 1,905 feet (581 m) above sea level. Bridgewater lies fully within the Merrimack River watershed. The western town line follows the eastern shore of Newfound Lake.

== Demographics ==
Historical population
| Census | Pop. | Note | %± |
|---|---|---|---|
| 1790 | 281 | | — |
| 1800 | 664 | | 136.3% |
| 1810 | 1,104 | | 66.3% |
| 1820 | 727 | | −34.1% |
| 1830 | 783 | | 7.7% |
| 1840 | 747 | | −4.6% |
| 1850 | 667 | | −10.7% |
| 1860 | 560 | | −16.0% |
| 1870 | 453 | | −19.1% |
| 1880 | 384 | | −15.2% |
| 1890 | 332 | | −13.5% |
| 1900 | 244 | | −26.5% |
| 1910 | 187 | | −23.4% |
| 1920 | 199 | | 6.4% |
| 1930 | 151 | | −24.1% |
| 1940 | 226 | | 49.7% |
| 1950 | 222 | | −1.8% |
| 1960 | 293 | | 32.0% |
| 1970 | 398 | | 35.8% |
| 1980 | 606 | | 52.3% |
| 1990 | 796 | | 31.4% |
| 2000 | 974 | | 22.4% |
| 2010 | 1,083 | | 11.2% |
| 2020 | 1,160 | | 7.1% |
U.S. Decennial Census

At the 2000 census there were 974 people, 414 households, and 289 families living in the town. The population density was 45.8 inhabitants per square mile (17.7/km^{2}). There were 850 housing units at an average density of 40.0 per square mile (15.4/km^{2}). The racial makeup of the town was 99.08% White, 0.10% Native American, 0.51% Asian, 0.21% from other races, and 0.10% from two or more races. Hispanic or Latino of any race were 0.62%.

Of the 414 households 24.9% had children under the age of 18 living with them, 61.6% were married couples living together, 6.5% had a female householder with no husband present, and 30.0% were non-families. 23.9% of households were one person and 12.3% were one person aged 65 or older. The average household size was 2.35 and the average family size was 2.78.

The age distribution was 19.7% under the age of 18, 4.5% from 18 to 24, 25.2% from 25 to 44, 31.3% from 45 to 64, and 19.3% 65 or older. The median age was 45 years. For every 100 females, there were 96.8 males. For every 100 females age 18 and over, there were 89.8 males.

The median household income was $50,662 and the median family income was $54,722. Males had a median income of $33,250 versus $26,250 for females. The per capita income for the town was $28,600. About 6.1% of families and 6.9% of the population were below the poverty line, including 5.4% of those under age 18 and 4.9% of those age 65 or over.

== Education ==
Bridgewater is within the Pasquaney School District along with Groton and Hebron. Bridgewater-Hebron Village School is in Bridgewater and serves district students from grades K-8. The district has no secondary school and instead students attend either Newfound Regional High School in Bristol or Plymouth Regional High School in Plymouth for grades 9–12.
