= Sculptured Rocks Natural Area =

Nature preserve in the U.S. state of New Hampshire

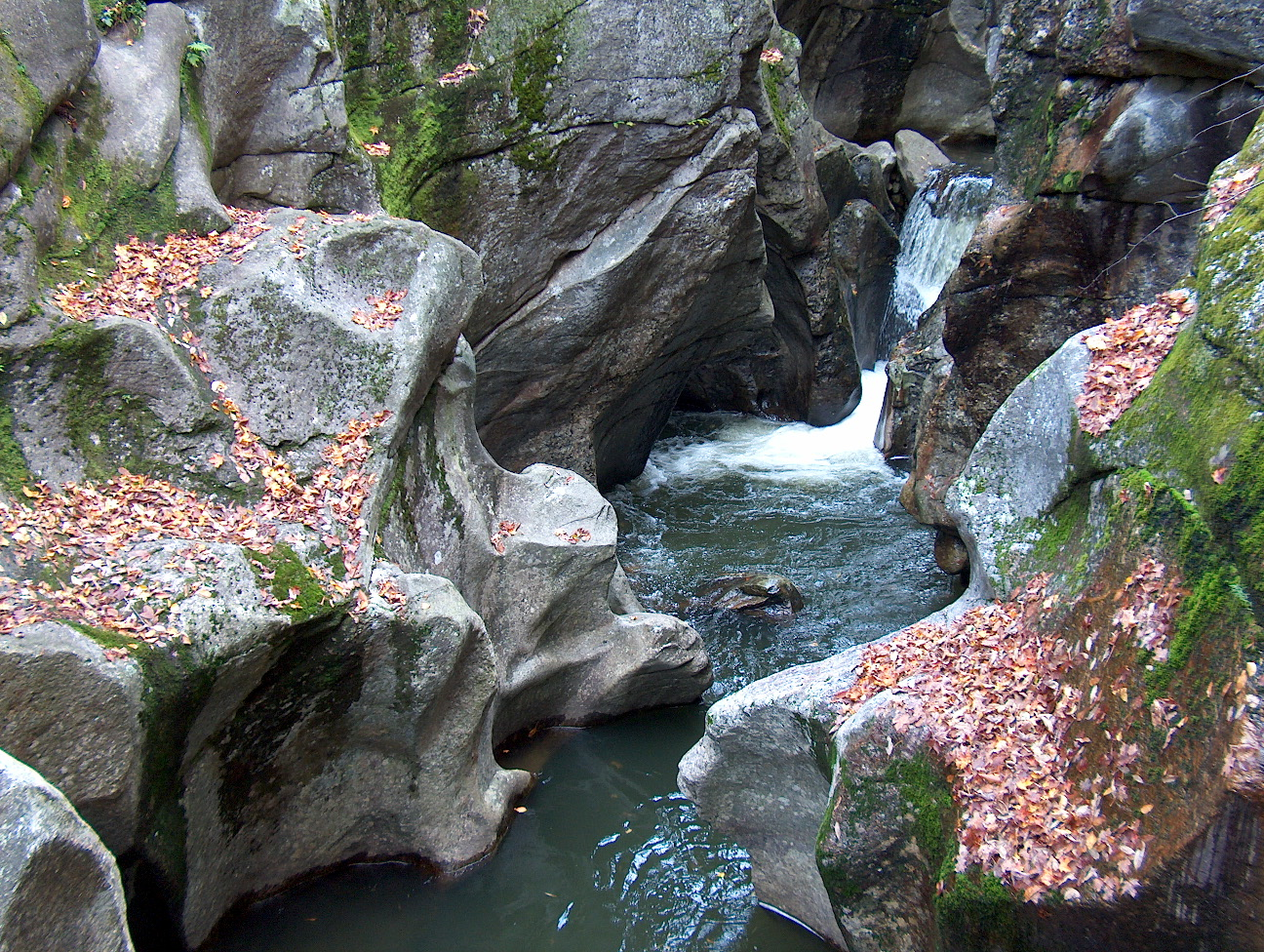
- Sculptured Rocks on the Cockermouth River

- Location within New Hampshire
- Interactive map of Sculptured Rocks Natural Area
- Location: Groton, New Hampshire, United States
- Coordinates: 43°42′26″N 71°51′20″W
- Area: 272 acres (110 ha)
- Elevation: 718 feet (219 m)
- Established: 1935
- Administrator: New Hampshire Division of Parks and Recreation
- Website: Official website
- New Hampshire State Parks

The Sculptured Rocks Natural Area is a 272-acre (110 ha) geology-oriented nature preserve in Groton, New Hampshire. The natural area's main feature is its namesake, the Sculptured Rocks, which are a series of narrow, sharply carved rock formations that are a popular local swimming hole. They are located on the Cockermouth River, which is the longest tributary of Newfound Lake. The Sculptured Rocks Road, which runs along this same river, shares its namesake with the park.
