= Newfound Regional High School =

Location
- 150 Newfound Road; Bristol, New Hampshire 03222; United States; 43°36′25″N 71°40′37″W

Information
- School type: Public high school
- Motto: "Choose your path to success...make a commitment."
- Founded: 1989
- School district: Newfound Area School District
- CEEB code: 300060
- Principal: Jason Robert
- Assistant principal: Jared DeGraffe
- Staff: 32.60 (FTE)
- Grades: 9–12
- Enrollment: 377 (2022-23)
- Student to teacher ratio: 11.56
- Language: English
- Colors: Green and white
- Athletics conference: NHIAA; Division III
- Mascot: Bears
- Rivals: Franklin High School; Gilford High School; Mascoma Valley Regional High School
- Accreditation: NEASC
- Newspaper: Newfound Literary Magazine
- Communities served: Alexandria, Bridgewater, Bristol, Danbury, Groton, Hebron, Hill, and New Hampton, New Hampshire
- Feeder schools: Newfound Memorial Middle School
- Website: nrhs.sau4.org

Newfound Regional High School (NRHS) is a public secondary school in Bristol, New Hampshire, United States. Surrounding towns that attend NRHS are Alexandria, Bridgewater, Bristol, Danbury, Groton, Hebron, Hill, and New Hampton. The school is part of the Newfound Area School District (NASD) and was originally named Newfound Memorial High School. It was originally located where Newfound Memorial Middle School currently stands, until the present high school building was constructed in 1989. Newfound Regional High School was awarded "NH Excellence in Education" in 2010.

== School district ==
Newfound Regional High School is part of School Administrative Unit 4. The superintendent of schools is Brian Connelly. NRHS is the only high school within the district, and the school board approves most of the decisions. There are one high school, one middle school, and four elementary schools in the district.

School name	Location	Type of school
Newfound Regional High School	Bristol	High school
Newfound Memorial Middle School	Bristol	Middle school
Bridgewater-Hebron Village School	Bridgewater	Elementary school
Bristol Elementary School	Bristol	Elementary school
Danbury Elementary School	Danbury	Elementary school
New Hampton Community School	New Hampton	Elementary school

== Administration ==
Newfound Regional High School has one principal, one assistant principal, and multiple administrative staff positions. Paul Hoiriis became the current principal on July 1, 2015. The previous principal, Michael O'Malley, retired at the end of the 2014–2015 school calendar. He had served the district for 30 years.

== School culture ==
Newfound has 34 full-time teachers and 402 students. There is a 6% minority enrollment, mostly made of African Americans and Asians. According to usnews.com, Newfound Regional High School was ranked #11 in Best High Schools in New Hampshire in 2015. Newfound Regional High School was 81% proficiency in reading, and 37% proficient in mathematics.

== School board ==
The school board for the Newfound Area School District is made up of one member from each of the seven towns, elected district-wide by ballot on election day. Current members are Melissa Suckling of Danbury (chair), Kimberly Bliss of Alexandria (vice chair), Dominic Halle of Bridgewater, Joseph Maloney of Bristol, William Jolly of Groton, Jennifer Larochelle of Hebron, and Fran Wendleboe of New Hampton.

== Student activities ==
There are numerous student activities offered at Newfound, including a literary magazine, jazz band, and drama club. Newfound offers three varsity sports in the fall: field hockey, soccer, unified soccer, and football. Newfound also offers cross country in the fall. Newfound offers both varsity and junior varsity basketball, unified basketball in the winter, and spirit and alpine skiing. In the spring, Newfound offers varsity and junior varsity baseball and softball, as well as track & field.

=== Student-Staff Senate ===
The Student-Staff Senate (SSS) is made up of students and staff who work on changes to the school. Student-Staff Senate works like the U.S Senate. SSS has committees and subcommittees for each area of topics. SSS currently has 11 subcommittees, including Advisories, Portfolio, Project Promise / Clubs, Performance Assessment, Public Relations, Challenge Day, Change Culture, Student Handbook, Student/Staff Voice, Bylaws, and Athletics. During meetings and proposals, SSS uses Robert's Rules of Order. The main purpose of this Senate is to have student and staff, alike, convene with each other and use the Senate as a way to discuss matters that the students and teachers bring up.

=== Student Council ===
Student Council is made up by the student body along with adult adviser(s). Student Council plans events such as Homecoming, winter carnival, and spring fling. Newfound Student Council follows their own constitution that they have written up and approved by the council. Student Council has separate committees and subcommittees to focus on specific areas. Student Council meetings are run by parliamentary procedures. In order for a Student Council meeting to be in session, there must be a quorum that is met. Along with a quorum, in order to pass approvals (e.g.: fundraiser requests, agendas, ideas) the body must agree with a majority vote.

==== Members ====
Members are selected in various ways. In order to obtain a membership within Student Council, one must:

- request to become members-at-large
- be a student representative to the school board (elected by the entire student body)
- be a Student Council representative (elected by your class)
- be a Vice President of your class (elected by your class)

=== Yearbook ===
Students create the annual yearbook. Newfound uses Jostens as their primary yearbook company. Each year, the school dedicates the yearbook to an educator or administrator who exceeded expectations, or to someone who served at NRHS for a long time and is either retiring or leaving their position. The 2014–2015 yearbook was dedicated to Principal O'Malley, who was retiring at the end of the school year. He had served the district for 30 years.

=== Project Promise ===
Project Promise is a program offered at NRHS along with other schools in NASD. The program focuses on academic achievement in various subjects, physical and nutritional programs. Project Promise branches off with many of the extra-curricular programs offered at the school. Cooking Club, Fashion Club, Zumba, Homework Club, Fitness Club, Japanese Culture Club, Outdoor Club, and Geek Culture Club are part of Project Promise. Project Promise's goal is to "create a safe place that fosters youth voice and excitement among our participants." The program helps students transition after high school, and gives them opportunities to be leaders and mentors.

=== Annual spring musical ===
Every spring, the Newfound Drama Department hosts the annual school musical. The spring play has been an annual tradition for 34 years.

== Athletics ==
Newfound Regional High School is a Division III high school. The only two sports teams that are not in Division III are the spirit team and the football team, which are in Division IV. Newfound offers soccer, field hockey, football, and cross country in the fall. In the winter, the school offers basketball, spirit, and alpine skiing. In the spring, Newfound offers baseball, softball, and track and field. The field hockey team were the state champions in 2006 and won back-to-back state championships in 2008 and 2009. In 2017 the field hockey team won the D-III state championship.

=== Football ===
The Newfound Regional High School football program started in 2004, but was not funded by the school district. The community created an organization to support the program. It was not until 2008 that the school board approved of supporting the football program. In 2005, the football team won the New Hampshire Interscholastic Athletic Association Sportsmanship Award. Since the beginning of the program, Newfound has yet to win any state titles or runners-up.

On August 23, 2012, Newfound Regional High School added a football field next to the school campus. The school board approved adding a football field at the high school, but stated that it would have to come from the taxpayers. To avoid that, the non-profit organization "Friends of Newfound Football" raised enough donations to avoid the expense paid by the taxpayers. Before the addition of the new football field, Newfound was practicing and playing "home" games at the New Hampton School. Newfound's first home game at their new field was on September 8, 2013, against Winnisquam Regional High School. The football field was named "Morrison Field". It took nine years for the field to be ready for use.

On November 4, 2018, against Franklin High School, the first ever home state playoff game was held at Morrison Field.

=== Track and field ===
The boys' track and field program first started in 1980 by Earl Mills, who ran the program until 1998. Newfound boys' track and field has had 14 individual state champions, along with two state decathlon champions.

The girls' track and field team has produced 15 individual state champions since 2004. The first coach for the Newfound girls' track and field team was Peter Cornelissen.

=== Field hockey ===
The Newfound field hockey team has won four state championships since 2009, most recently in 2017. Ann Hall started the program in 1974, but retired the next year. Karri Peterson has been the current field hockey coach since 2004. The team has won four state championships in Class M/S and D-III under Peterson.

=== Girls' basketball ===
The Newfound girls' basketball team were state champions in 1972 under Class A, and were state runners-up in 1973, 1988, and 2007. 11 Newfound players have scored more than 1,000 points during their high school varsity careers. Ann Hall was the first coach known to have coached the girls' basketball team. The current coach is Karri Peterson, a 1,000-point scorer herself. She also coaches the field hockey team. The latest 1,000 point scorer to Newfound was Ashlee Dukette in 2018. She also became the first Newfound basketball player to achieve 1,000 rebounds, in 2019.

=== Boys' basketball ===
The boys' basketball team were state champions in 1995. The coach then was Dan Peters. There are seven players who have scored 1,000 points in their high school varsity careers:

=== Boys' cross country ===
Newfound's boys' cross country team was founded in 1978. The team has won state championships in class M/S in 1985, 1986, and 1987, and were runners up in 1990, 2003, and 2021. The team had a class S individual championship in 1953.

=== Girls' cross country ===
Newfound's girls' cross country was founded in 1978. The team had an individual championship winner in 2005 and 2006.

== Communities ==
Newfound Regional High School serves the New Hampshire towns of Alexandria, Bridgewater, Bristol, Danbury, Groton, Hebron, Hill and New Hampton. On March 18, Hill residents voted to withdraw from the Franklin School District and join Newfound. With two more votes agreeing with the motion, Hill will now have a 10-year tuition agreement with Newfound. The final vote was 75-73.

== Academics ==
Newfound offers Advanced Placement courses including AP Calculus, AP Computer Science, AP US History, and AP Biology. The school offers Virtual Learning Academy Charter School, and Jump$tart Coalition for Personal Financial Literacy courses, such as accounting. Newfound also offers Extended Learning Opportunities (ELO). Some courses Newfound has to offer are: Spanish I, II, III, IV, V; French I, II, III, IV, V; Economics, Modern European History, Global Studies, Programming I, II, III AP; Robotics; Chemistry; Living on Your Own (LOYO); Family & Consumer Science.

Newfound has partnered with Plymouth Regional High School so that it can send its students to PRHS for classes such as Culinary Arts, Health Science, Mechanics, and Marketing.

=== Grades and grading ===
Newfound uses the summative assessment and formative assessment continuum. Most of the teachers weigh the summatives as 90% of the overall grade for the quarter and 10% formatives for the overall grade for the quarter. Each quarter (4) is 20% of the overall grade, and exams are 20% of the final grade. They factor in 80% from the four quarters, and 20% from the midterm grade and the final exams. Formatives are homework, short essays, and document-based question. Most of the time, these materials would get students ready for the summatives. Summatives are quizzes (sometimes formative), projects, and tests.

=== Awards ===
Newfound Regional High School has received some awards as a school, and also as individual awards recognized by the State of New Hampshire and/or individual organizations:

Recipient	Title of award	Sponsor	Year
Newfound	New Hampshire School of Excellence	Edies Award	2010
Michael O'Malley	Outstanding Role Model	New Hampshire Association of School Principals	2011
Michael O'Malley	Outstanding Role Model	New Hampshire Association of School Principals	2012
Paul Hoiriis	Carole J. Estes Community Leader Award	CADY	2014
Paul Hoiriis	New Hampshire Assistant Principal of the Year	New Hampshire Association of School Principals	2015
Peter Dumont	New Hampshire Environmental Educator of the Year	New Hampshire Environmental Educators Association	2017
Barbara Kelly	New Hampshire School Nurse of the Year	New Hampshire School Nurses' Association	2017

== Gallery ==
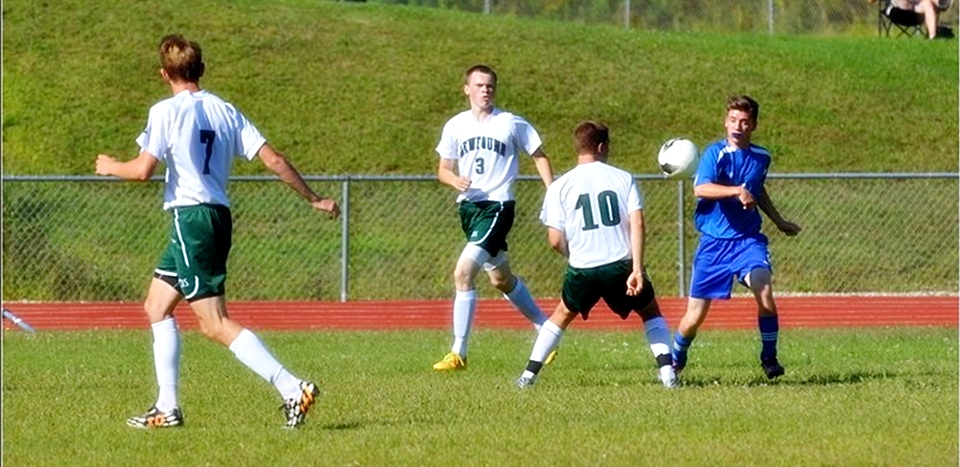
Newfound playing against Gilford High School at home

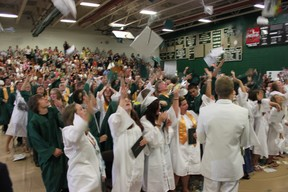
Class of 2011 graduation ceremony
