= Newfound River (New Hampshire) =

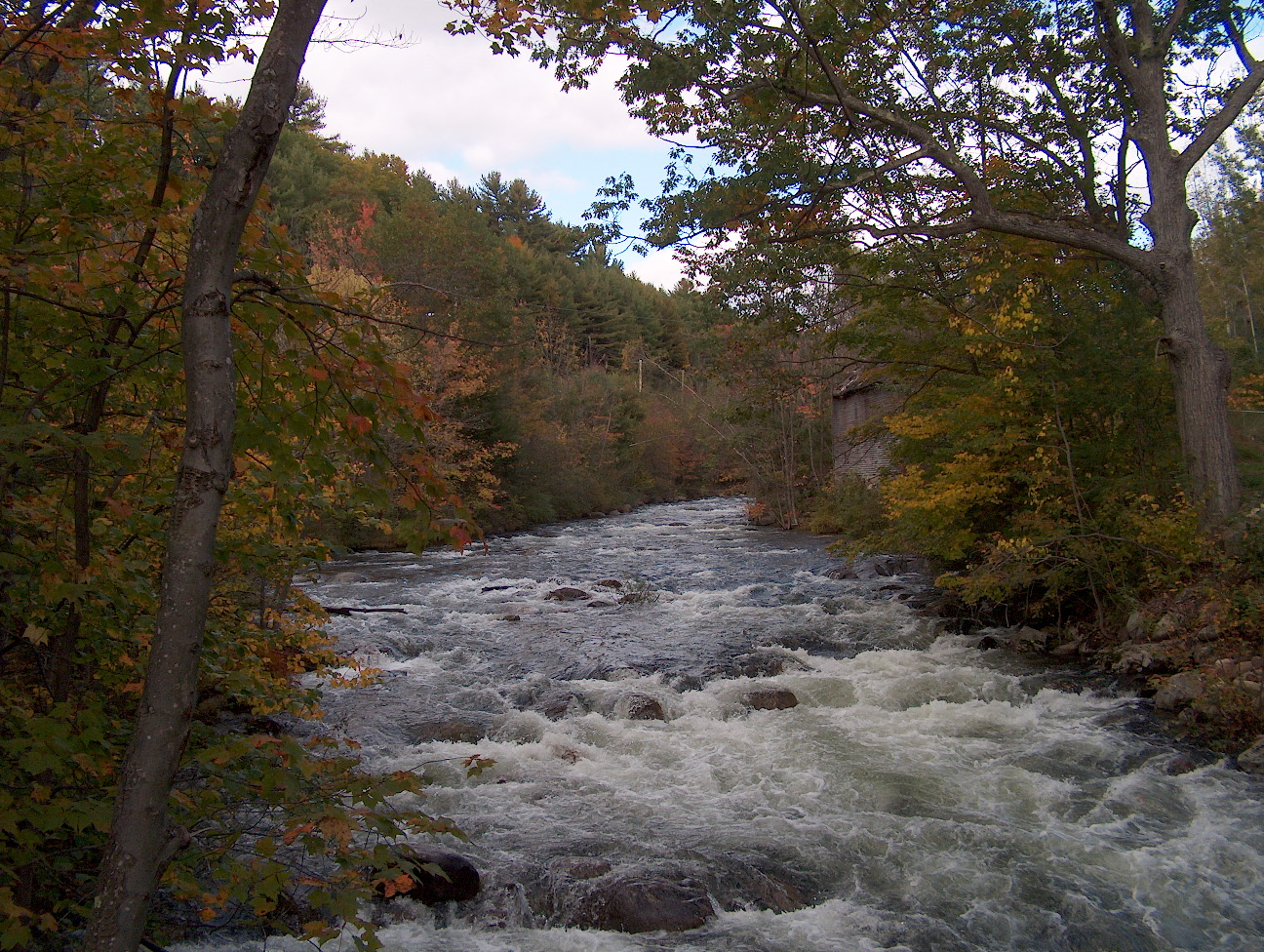
- The Newfound River in Bristol, New Hampshire

- Location within New Hampshire Location within the United States

Location
- Country: United States
- State: New Hampshire
- County: Grafton
- Town: Bristol

Physical characteristics
- Source: Newfound Lake
  - location: Bristol
  - coordinates: 43°37′2″N 71°44′26″W
  - elevation: 586 ft (179 m)
- Mouth: Pemigewasset River
  - location: Bristol
  - coordinates: 43°35′23″N 71°43′55″W
  - elevation: 350 ft (110 m)
- Length: 3.2 mi (5.1 km)

The Newfound River is a 3.2-mile-long (5.1 km) river in central New Hampshire in the United States. It is a tributary of the Pemigewasset River, part of the Merrimack River watershed.

The Newfound River begins at the outlet of Newfound Lake in Bristol, New Hampshire. The river drops rapidly through the town of Bristol, passing over several hydroelectric dams before reaching the Pemigewasset.

Major tributaries of the Newfound River (via Newfound Lake) are the Fowler River and the Cockermouth River.

== See also ==
- List of rivers of New Hampshire
