= Minot–Sleeper Library =

- U.S. National Register of Historic Places
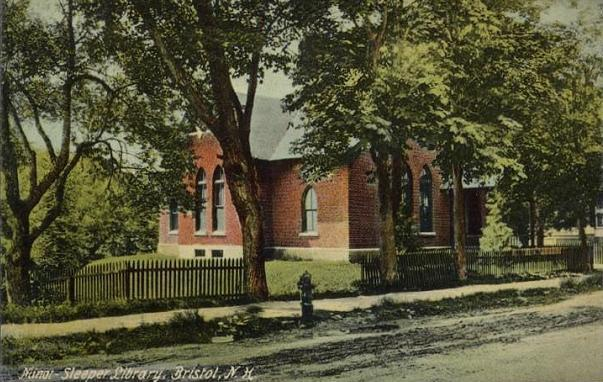
- The library building c. 1910

- Location within New Hampshire Location within the United States
- Location: 35 Pleasant St., Bristol, New Hampshire
- Coordinates: 43°35′26″N 71°44′19″W
- Area: 0.4 acres (0.16 ha)
- Built: 1884
- Architect: Hutchinson, Ebenezer B.
- Architectural style: Late Victorian
- NRHP reference No.: 88001434
- Added to NRHP: September 15, 1988

The Minot–Sleeper Library is the public library of Bristol, New Hampshire. It is located at 35 Pleasant Street, in an 1885 brick building that is listed on the National Register of Historic Places. The library was the first in the state's Lakes Region to have a purpose-built building. The library offers borrowing service, as well as Wifi, Internet-accessible computers, and a variety of programmed activities.

== Architecture and history ==
The Minot–Sleeper Library is located in the town center of Bristol, on the south side of Pleasant Street west of Central Square. It is a single-story masonry structure, built out of red brick, with a gabled slate roof and granite trim. Stylistically it has a mix of Late Victorian elements, with Gothic-arched windows and roof gables with Stick style woodwork. The interior retains most of its original finishes on the main floor; the basement was modernized as an expansion in 1970s, and a major addition repeated the original's details in 2012-13.

The town's first library was founded in 1823, and was a private library open by subscription. The town made a short-lived attempt to establish a public library in 1868, which was abandoned in 1872 with the books auctioned off. In 1883, Judge Josiah Minot and Colonel Solomon Sleeper, both natives of Bristol, offered the town the land and funding for a building, as well as further support for the acquisition of a collection. This offer was accepted by the town, and this building was completed in 1885, designed and built by a local contractor, Ebenezer Hutchinson.

== See also ==
- National Register of Historic Places listings in Grafton County, New Hampshire
