= E. Maude Ferguson =

American politician

Member of the New Hampshire House of Representatives
- In office c. 1927 – c. 1930

Member of the New Hampshire Senate
- In office 1931 – June 6, 1932
- Constituency: 5th State Senate district (Note: Bristol is currently in the 2nd State Senate district; contemporary sources indicate that when Ferguson served, she represented the 5th State Senate district.)

Personal details
- Born: Edna Maude Fowler; August 28, 1883 Danvers, Massachusetts, U.S.
- Died: June 23, 1932 (aged 48) Bristol, New Hampshire, U.S.
- Party: Republican
- Spouse: Samuel Ferguson (m. 1912)
- Education: Tilton School

E. Maude Ferguson (August 28, 1883 – June 23, 1932) was an American politician who became the first woman to serve in the New Hampshire Senate.

== Early life ==
Ferguson was born Edna Maude Fowler in Danvers, Massachusetts, on August 28, 1883. She was the daughter of Dr. Edgar Omera Fowler, a doctor with a large medical practice, and Addie (Bucklin) Fowler. She graduated from Tilton School, in Tilton, New Hampshire (then Tilton Seminary) in 1900. She then attended and graduated from the Greeley School of Elocution and Dramatics in Boston in 1903. Ferguson became involved in her local community in Grafton County, New Hampshire, becoming chairman of the Republican Women of Grafton County and involved in Bristol Women's Club and the League of Women Voters.

== Career ==
Ferguson, a Republican, was elected to serve in the New Hampshire House of Representatives representing Bristol, New Hampshire, in 1926; she was re-elected in 1928. In November 1930, she was elected to the New Hampshire Senate for the 1931–1933 term, becoming the first female to serve in that body. She was not reelected to the 1932 term, even though her fellow Republicans had elected her to their caucus in 1931. Rising in the political sphere in New Hampshire, Ferguson was elected as a delegate to the 1932 Republican National Convention held in Chicago.

== Death ==
Ferguson died by suicide on June 23, 1932, a week after she should have attended the Republican National Convention. She had stayed away from the convention and had been "ill" for some time according to her doctors. Her husband found her in their garden, dead from a self-inflicted wound.

== See also ==
- New Hampshire Historical Marker No. 269: E. Maude Ferguson, New Hampshire’s First Woman State Senator
