= Groton, New Hampshire =

- Town
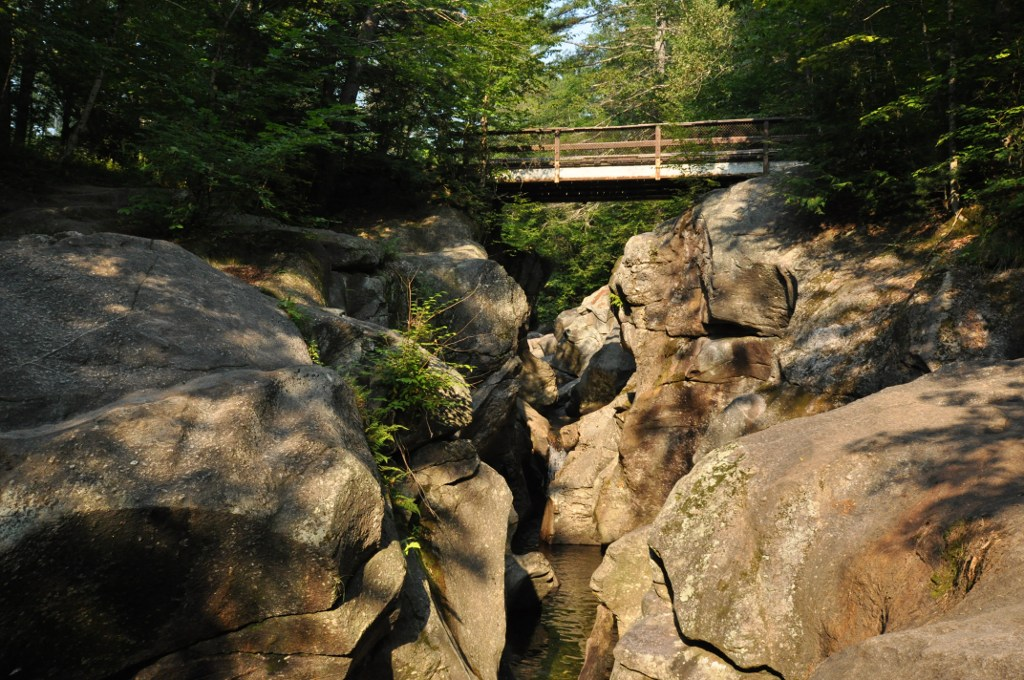
- Sculptured Rocks Natural Area, Cockermouth River

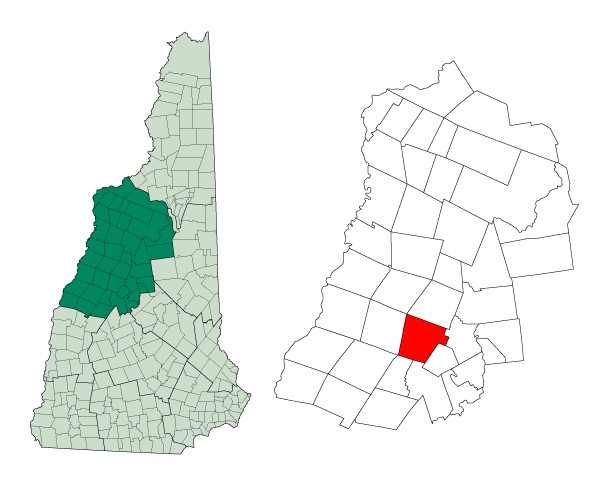
- Location in Grafton County, New Hampshire
- Coordinates: 43°44′42″N 71°51′38″W
- Country: United States
- State: New Hampshire
- County: Grafton
- Incorporated: 1761
- Villages: Groton; North Groton

Area
  - Total: 40.8 sq mi (105.6 km^{2})
  - Land: 40.7 sq mi (105.4 km^{2})
  - Water: 0.077 sq mi (0.2 km^{2}) 0.16%
- Elevation: 1,434 ft (437 m)

Population (2020)
  - Total: 569
  - Density: 14/sq mi (5.4/km^{2})
- Time zone: UTC-5 (Eastern)
  - Summer (DST): UTC-4 (Eastern)
- ZIP code: 03241 (Hebron); 03266 (Rumney)
- Area code: 603
- FIPS code: 33-32180
- GNIS feature ID: 873614
- Website: grotonnh.gov

Groton is a town in Grafton County, New Hampshire, United States. The population was 569 at the 2020 census.

== History ==
It was originally named "Cockermouth" in honor of Charles Wyndham, Baron Cockermouth and Earl of Egremont, who was Great Britain's Secretary of State for the Southern Department from 1761 to 1763. Due to non-settlement the land was regranted in 1766, then renewed in 1772. In 1796, one of the later grantees, Samuel Blood, succeeded in renaming the town after his hometown, Groton, Massachusetts.

Groton's surface is uneven, although farmers found the soil arable for growing corn and potatoes. A branch of the Baker River in the north, together with several small streams feeding Newfound Lake in the south, provided water power for mills. By 1859, when the population was 776, there were ten sawmills, two gristmills, and a shingle and clapboard manufacturer. Although not open to the public, the Palermo Mine in North Groton is noted for its minerals.

On August 4, 2009, Groton approved siting a wind farm in the town. The wind farm was built by Iberdrola Renewables.

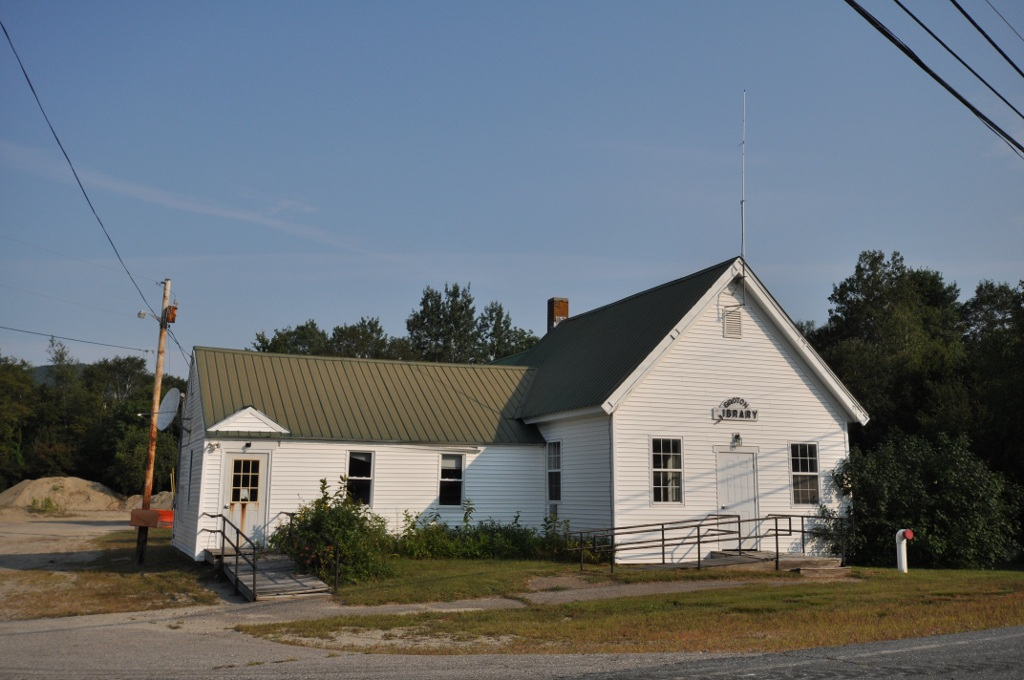
Highway Department building (former library)

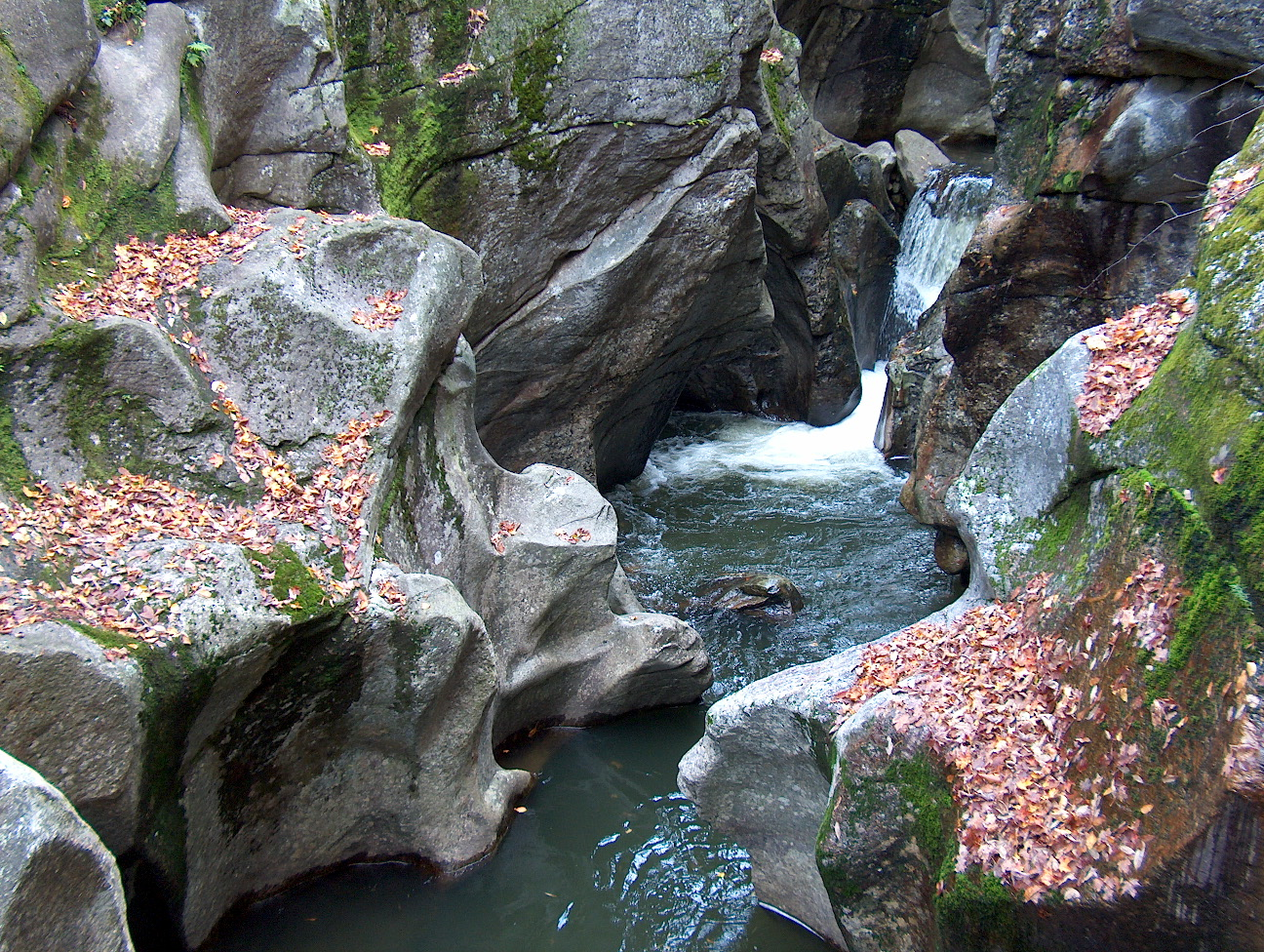
Sculptured Rocks, Cockermouth River

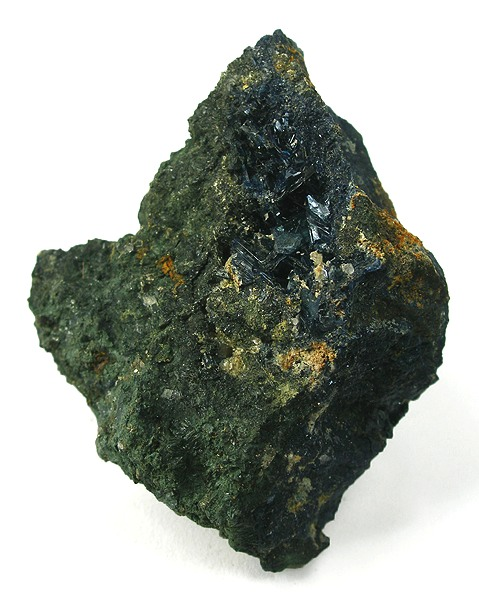
Vivianite from North Groton

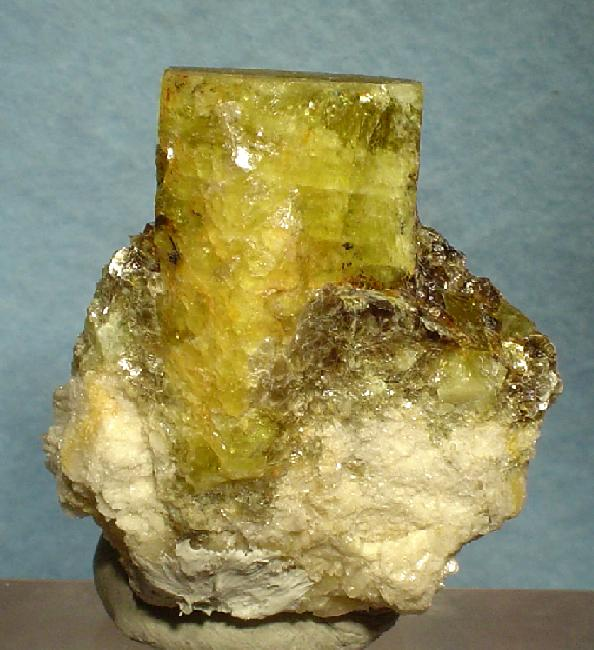
Beryl from North Groton

== Geography ==
According to the United States Census Bureau, the town has a total area of 40.8 square miles (105.6 km^{2}), of which approximately 40.7 square miles (105.4 km^{2}) are land and 0.077 square miles (0.2 km^{2}) are water, comprising 0.16% of the town. The highest point in Groton is the summit of Tenney Mountain, at 2,350 feet (720 m) above sea level. The Cockermouth River, a tributary of Newfound Lake, flows from west to east across the center of the town. Groton lies fully within the Merrimack River watershed.

== Demographics ==
Historical population
Census	Pop.	Note	%±
1790	373		—
1800	391		4.8%
1810	549		40.4%
1820	686		25.0%
1830	669		−2.5%
1840	870		30.0%
1850	776		−10.8%
1860	778		0.3%
1870	583		−25.1%
1880	566		−2.9%
1890	464		−18.0%
1900	346		−25.4%
1910	319		−7.8%
1920	199		−37.6%
1930	202		1.5%
1940	182		−9.9%
1950	105		−42.3%
1960	99		−5.7%
1970	120		21.2%
1980	255		112.5%
1990	318		24.7%
2000	456		43.4%
2010	593		30.0%
2020	569		−4.0%
U.S. Decennial Census

As of the census of 2000, there were 456 people, 175 households, and 127 families residing in the town. The population density was 11.2 inhabitants per square mile (4.3/km^{2}). There were 342 housing units at an average density of 8.4 per square mile (3.2/km^{2}). The racial makeup of the town was 97.81% White, 0.22% Native American, 0.88% Asian, and 1.10% from two or more races.

There were 175 households, out of which 30.3% had children under the age of 18 living with them, 65.1% were married couples living together, 2.9% had a single female head of household, and 27.4% were non-families. 21.1% of all households were made up of individuals, and 5.7% had someone living alone who was 65 years of age or older. The average household size was 2.61 and the average family size was 2.98.

In the town, the population was spread out, with 25.9% under the age of 18, 6.6% from 18 to 24, 29.8% from 25 to 44, 26.3% from 45 to 64, and 11.4% who were 65 years of age or older. The median age was 40 years. For every 100 females, there were 117.1 males. For every 100 females age 18 and over, there were 113.9 males.

The median income for a household in the town was $37,083, and the median income for a family was $46,250. Males had a median income of $28,906 versus $25,417 for females. The per capita income for the town was $18,680. About 6.7% of families and 6.7% of the population were below the poverty line, including 3.9% of those under age 18 and 22.0% of those age 65 or over.

== Education ==
Groton is within the Newfound Area School District. The district's secondary schools are Newfound Memorial Middle School, and Newfound Regional High School in Bristol.
