= Wellington State Park =

State park in Grafton County, New Hampshire

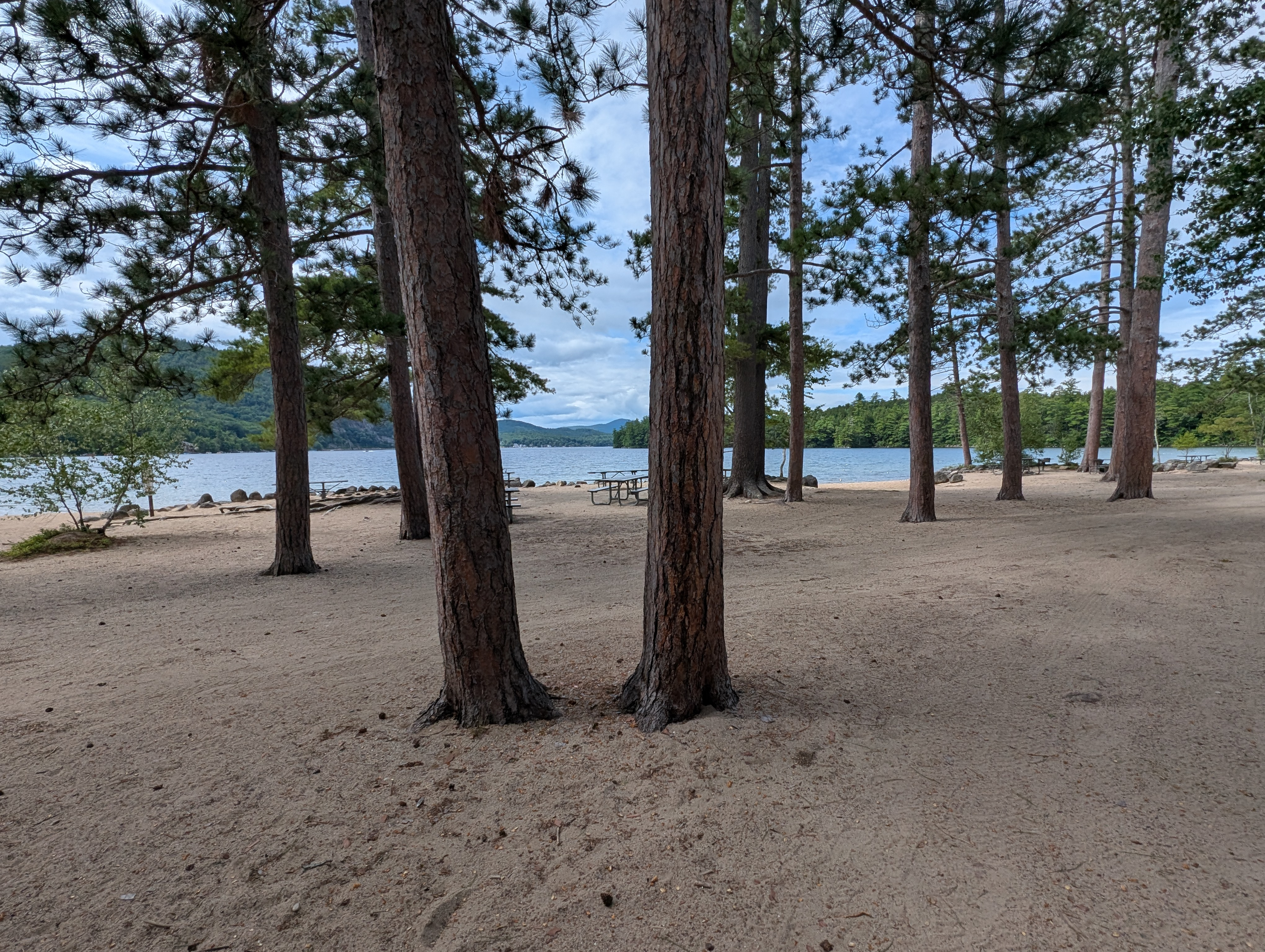
- Newfound Lake shore

- Location within New Hampshire
- Interactive map of Wellington State Park
- Location: Bristol, New Hampshire, United States
- Coordinates: 43°38′37″N 71°46′36″W
- Area: 220.2 acres (89.1 ha)
- Elevation: 594 ft (181 m)
- Established: 1931
- Administrator: New Hampshire Division of Parks and Recreation
- Website: Official website
- New Hampshire State Parks

Wellington State Park is a 220-acre (89 ha) public recreation area located on the southwest shore of Newfound Lake in Bristol, New Hampshire. The state park features the largest freshwater swimming beach in the New Hampshire state park system. Activities include swimming, fishing, non-motorized boating, hiking and picnicking. A 7-mile (11 km) trail system that begins in the park leads hikers to the top of Little and Big Sugarloaf mountains.

The park owes its existence to the largesse of Elizabeth R. Wellington, who in 1931 turned over a tract of land known as the Wellington Reservation to the state for the handsome sum of $1. The Civilian Conservation Corps developed the park during the 1930s.

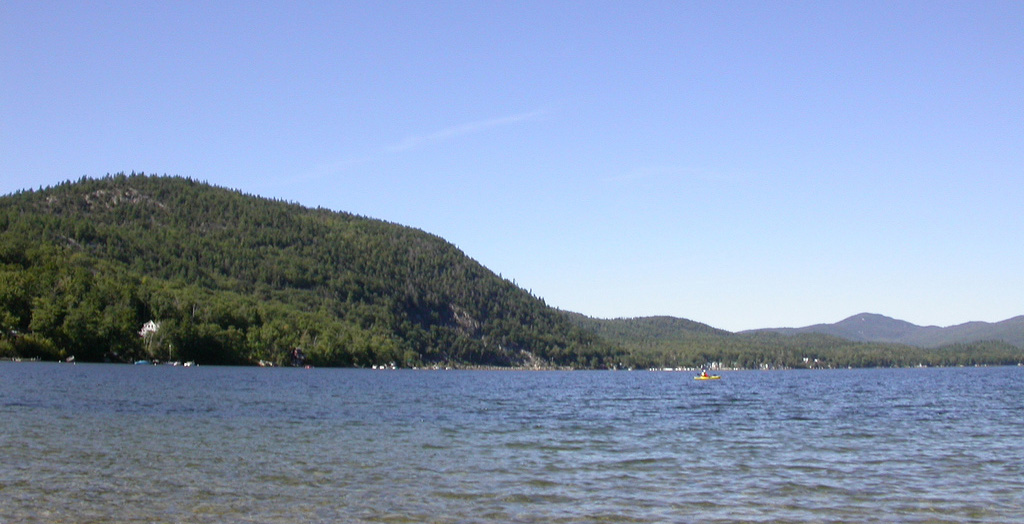
Newfound Lake
