= Fowler River =

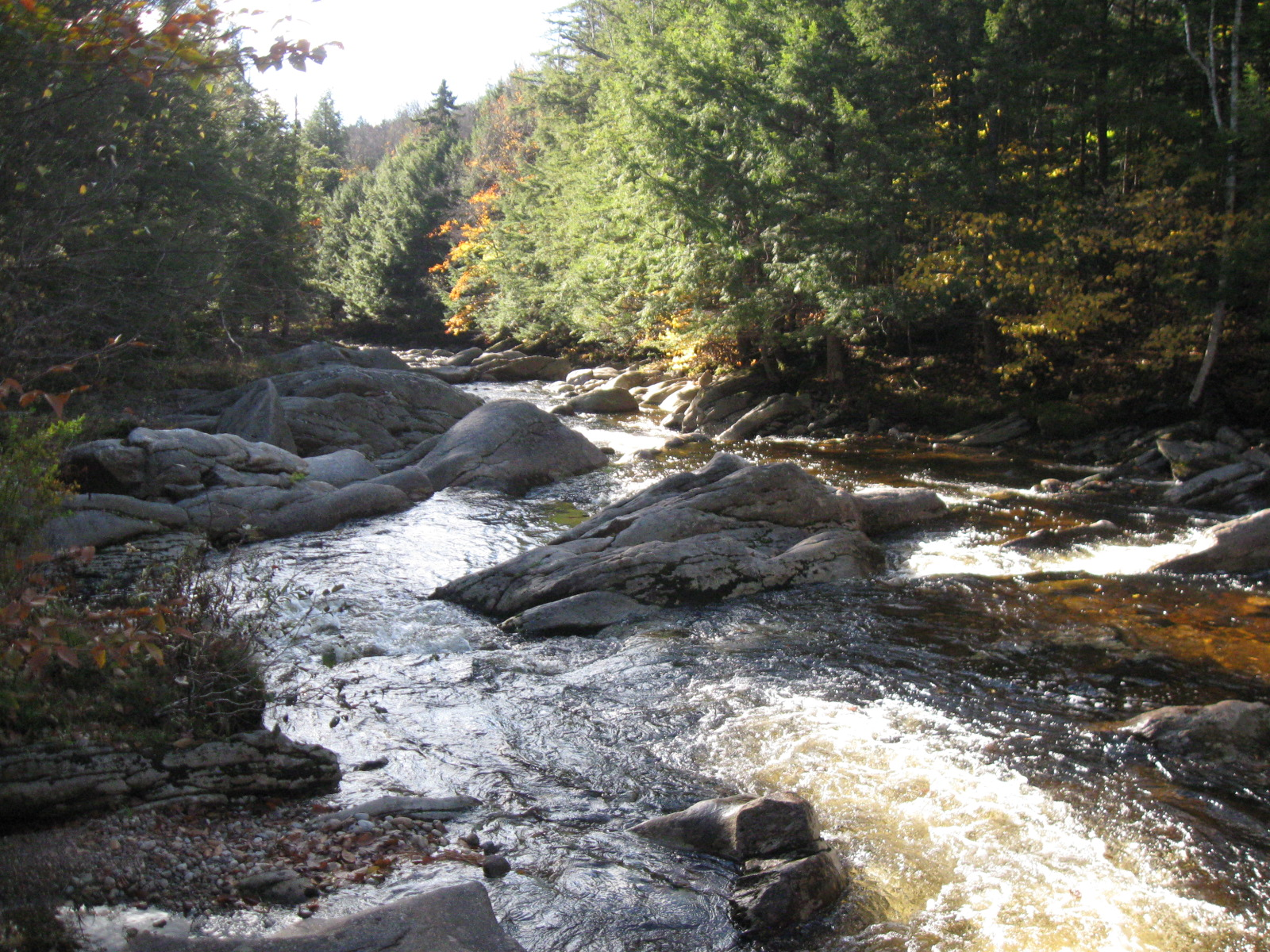
- The Fowler River at upper Fowler River Road crossing in Alexandria, NH

- Location within New Hampshire Location within the United States

Location
- Country: United States
- State: New Hampshire
- County: Grafton
- Towns: Alexandria, Bristol

Physical characteristics
- Source: Confluence of Clark Brook and Brock Brook
  - location: Alexandria
  - coordinates: 43°38′44″N 71°49′55″W
  - elevation: 810 ft (250 m)
- Mouth: Newfound Lake
  - location: Bristol
  - coordinates: 43°38′21″N 71°46′21″W
  - elevation: 588 ft (179 m)
- Length: 6.1 mi (9.8 km)

Basin features
- Tributaries
  - right: Town Brook, Bog Brook

The Fowler River is a 6.1-mile-long (9.8 km) river located in central New Hampshire in the United States. It is an inflow to Newfound Lake, part of the Pemigewasset and Merrimack River watersheds. Below Bog Brook, the Fowler River is subject to the New Hampshire Comprehensive Shoreland Protection Act.

The primary tributary of the river is Clark Brook, which rises south of Mount Cardigan in the town of Alexandria and drops over Welton Falls. Chesley Brook joins from the north, at which point the stream valley widens and begins to support small agricultural operations. The brook's name changes to "Fowler River" when Brock Brook joins from the right at the first crossing of Fowler River Road. The river flows southeast to a junction with Bog Brook, where it turns north and flows one mile to Newfound Lake.

== See also ==
- List of rivers of New Hampshire
