= Cardigan Mountain State Park =

Public recreation area in New Hampshire, US

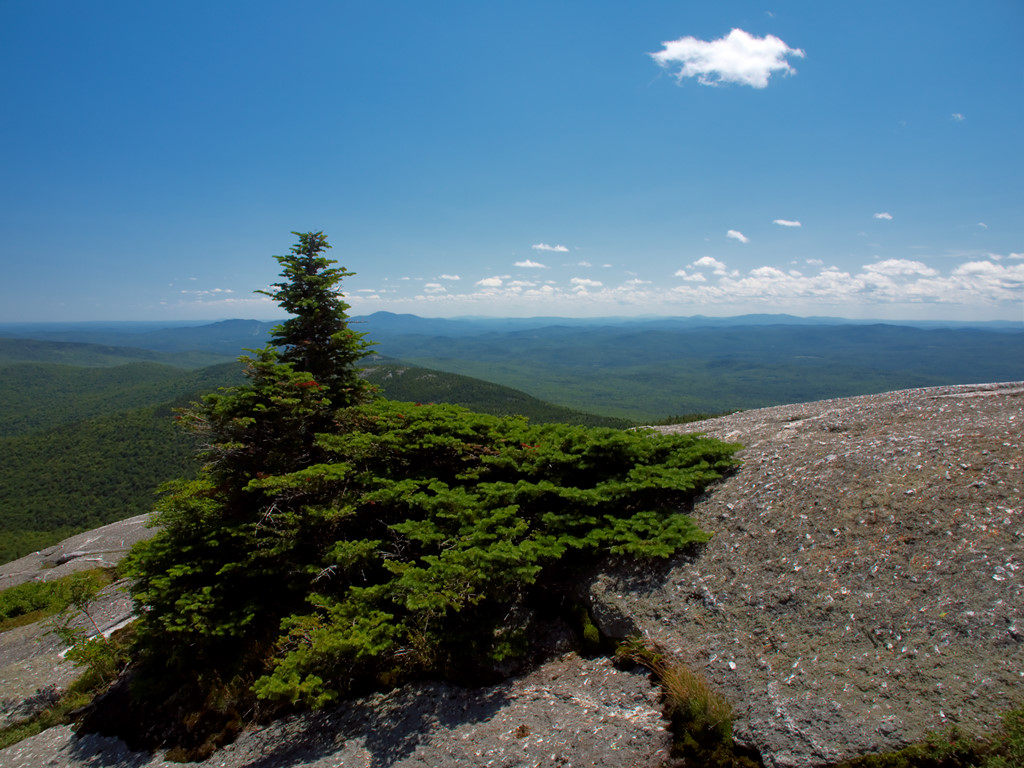
- South view from Mount Cardigan

- Location within New Hampshire
- Interactive map of Cardigan Mountain State Park
- Location: Orange, New Hampshire, United States
- Coordinates: 43°39′22″N 71°54′37″W
- Area: 5,655 acres (2,288 ha)
- Elevation: 3,045 feet (928 m)
- Established: 1939
- Administrator: New Hampshire Division of Parks and Recreation
- Website: Official website
- New Hampshire State Parks

Cardigan Mountain State Park is a 5,655-acre (2,288 ha) public recreation area in Orange, New Hampshire. The state park is free to use, open year-round, and offers a hiking trail up to the 3,121-foot treeless granite summit of Mount Cardigan plus places to picnic.
