= Smith River (Pemigewasset River tributary) =

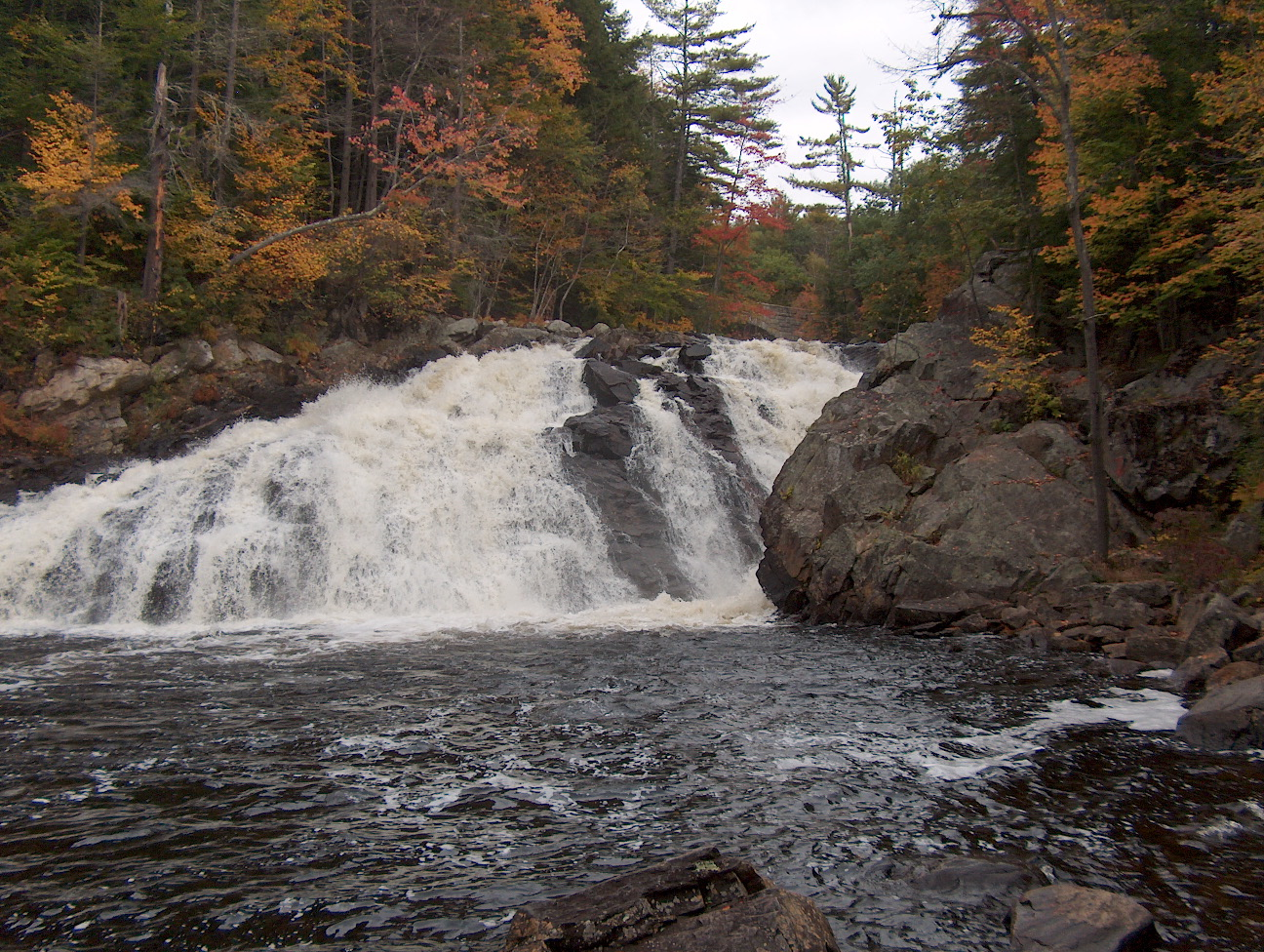
- Profile Falls on the Smith River near Bristol, New Hampshire

- Location within New Hampshire Location within the United States

Location
- Country: United States
- State: New Hampshire
- Counties: Grafton, Merrimack
- Towns: Grafton, Danbury, Alexandria, Hill, Bristol

Physical characteristics
- Source: Tewksbury Pond
  - location: Grafton
  - coordinates: 43°36′24″N 71°57′57″W
  - elevation: 924 ft (282 m)
- Mouth: Pemigewasset River
  - location: Bristol, Hill
  - coordinates: 43°33′49″N 71°43′40″W
  - elevation: 310 ft (94 m)
- Length: 25.0 mi (40.2 km)

The Smith River is a 25.0-mile-long (40.2 km) river located in central New Hampshire in the United States. It is a tributary of the Pemigewasset River, part of the Merrimack River watershed.

The Smith River begins at the outlet of Tewksbury Pond in Grafton, New Hampshire. The river flows southwest and then southeast through Grafton, passing through Kilton Pond. Continuing through Danbury, the river remains generally flat until shortly before reaching the Alexandria-Hill town line, where it enters a narrow valley and produces several miles of whitewater. Passing under the New Hampshire Route 3A bridge at the Bristol-Hill town line, the Smith River drops over Profile Falls and arrives at the Pemigewasset River.

U.S. Route 4 follows the Smith River from its source to Danbury. NH-104 follows the river from Danbury to the east side of Alexandria.

== See also ==
- List of rivers of New Hampshire
