= Hill, New Hampshire =

- Town
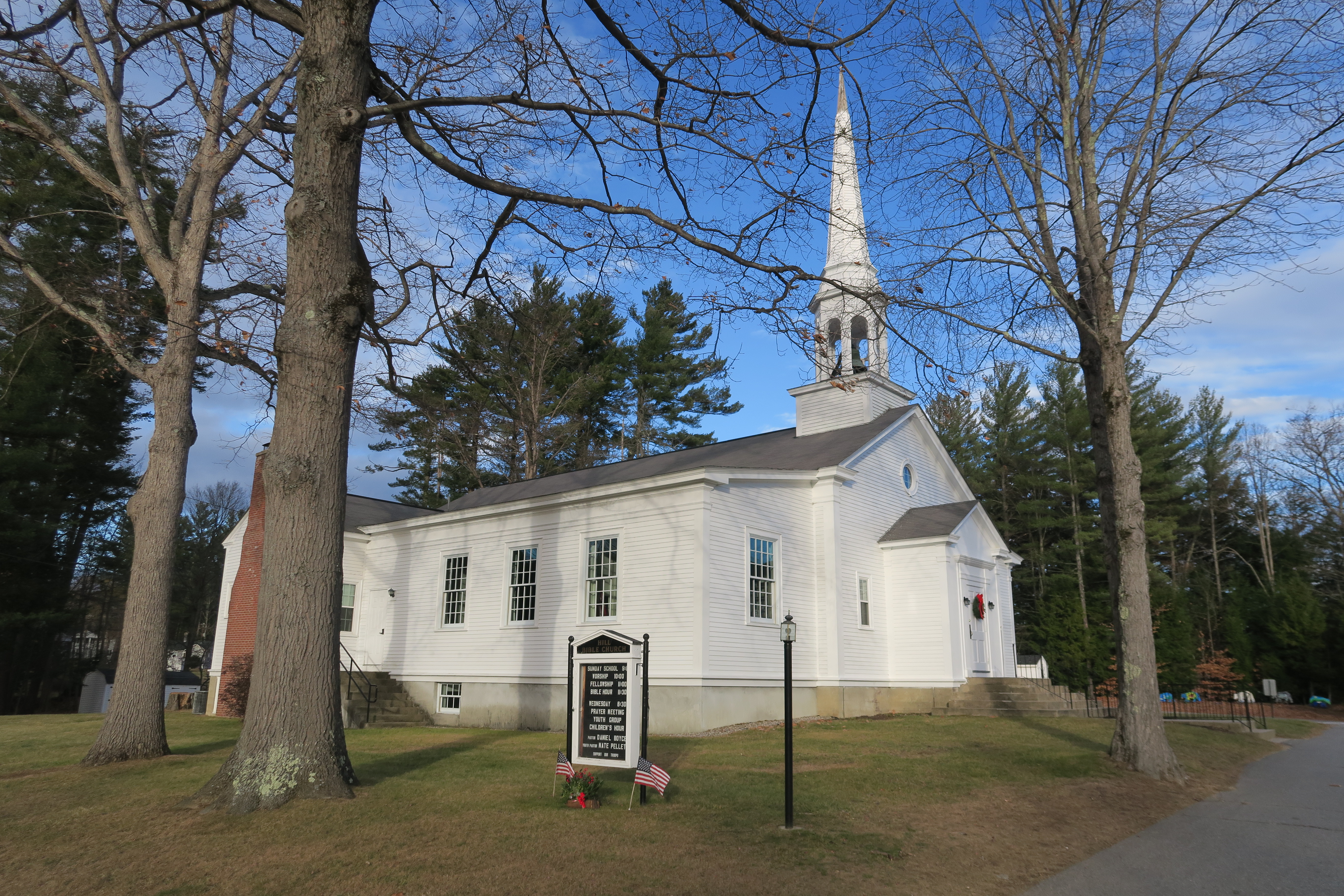
- Hill Village Bible Church

- Seal

- Location in Merrimack County and the state of New Hampshire
- Coordinates: 43°31′27″N 71°42′03″W
- Country: United States
- State: New Hampshire
- County: Merrimack
- Incorporated: 1778
- Villages: Hill; Hill Center; Murray Hill

Area
  - Total: 26.73 sq mi (69.23 km^{2})
  - Land: 26.55 sq mi (68.77 km^{2})
  - Water: 0.18 sq mi (0.46 km^{2}) 0.66%
- Elevation: 446 ft (136 m)

Population (2020)
  - Total: 1,017
  - Density: 38/sq mi (14.8/km^{2})
- Time zone: UTC-5 (Eastern)
  - Summer (DST): UTC-4 (Eastern)
- ZIP codes: 03243 (Hill); 03230 (Danbury)
- Area code: 603
- FIPS code: 33-35860
- GNIS feature ID: 867489
- Website: www.townofhillnh.org

Hill is a town in Merrimack County, New Hampshire, United States. The population was 1,017 at the 2020 census. It is home to William Thomas State Forest.

== History ==
Originally granted as "New Chester" in 1753, the town took the name "Hill" in 1837 in honor of Isaac Hill, governor of New Hampshire from 1836 to 1839. To accommodate the construction of the Franklin Falls Dam, the village of Hill was relocated in 1941.

== Geography ==
According to the United States Census Bureau, the town has a total area of 26.7 square miles (69.2 km^{2}), of which 26.6 square miles (68.8 km^{2}) are land and 0.2 square miles (0.5 km^{2}) are water, comprising 0.66% of the town. The Pemigewasset River forms the eastern boundary of the town, and its tributary the Smith River forms two portions of the northern boundary. The southwestern corner of the town drains south via Mountain Brook to the Blackwater River in neighboring Andover, a tributary of the Contoocook River. Via the Pemigewasset and Contoocook rivers, Hill lies fully within the Merrimack River watershed.

The highest point in town is Dickinson Hill, with an approximate elevation of 1,910 feet (580 m) above sea level.

=== Adjacent municipalities ===
- Bristol (north)
- New Hampton (northeast)
- Sanbornton (east)
- Franklin (southeast)
- Andover (south)
- Danbury (west)
- Alexandria (northwest)

== Demographics ==
Historical population
Census	Pop.	Note	%±
1870	620		—
1880	667		7.6%
1890	548		−17.8%
1900	603		10.0%
1910	556		−7.8%
1920	500		−10.1%
1930	468		−6.4%
1940	498		6.4%
1950	310		−37.8%
1960	396		27.7%
1970	450		13.6%
1980	736		63.6%
1990	814		10.6%
2000	992		21.9%
2010	1,089		9.8%
2020	1,017		−6.6%
U.S. Decennial Census

At the 2000 census there were 992 people, 382 households, and 271 families living in the town. The population density was 37.1 inhabitants per square mile (14.3/km^{2}). There were 436 housing units at an average density of 16.3 per square mile (6.3/km^{2}). The racial makeup of the town was 98.99% White, 0.10% African American, 0.10% Native American, 0.40% Asian, 0.10% Pacific Islander, and 0.30% from two or more races. Hispanic or Latino of any race were 0.20%.

Of the 382 households 33.0% had children under the age of 18 living with them, 57.9% were married couples living together, 8.4% had a female householder with no husband present, and 28.8% were non-families. 21.2% of households were one person and 8.1% were one person aged 65 or older. The average household size was 2.60 and the average family size was 3.01.

The age distribution was 26.7% under the age of 18, 6.1% from 18 to 24, 31.3% from 25 to 44, 25.7% from 45 to 64, and 10.2% 65 or older. The median age was 39 years. For every 100 females, there were 102.4 males. For every 100 females age 18 and over, there were 100.8 males.

The median household income was $48,333 and the median family income was $50,000. Males had a median income of $32,120 versus $24,313 for females. The per capita income for the town was $21,004. About 2.9% of families and 4.2% of the population were below the poverty line, including 1.2% of those under age 18 and none of those age 65 or over.

== Education ==
Hill has one school, Jennie D. Blake Elementary School, which serves students in kindergarten through sixth grade. The school was named for Jennie Lind Dickerson Blake, a Hill resident who was born on July 16, 1878. As of 2017, 68 students were enrolled in the school.

== Notable person ==
- Augustus C. French (1808–1864), ninth governor of Illinois; born in Hill
