= Newfound Lake =

Lake in Grafton County, New Hampshire

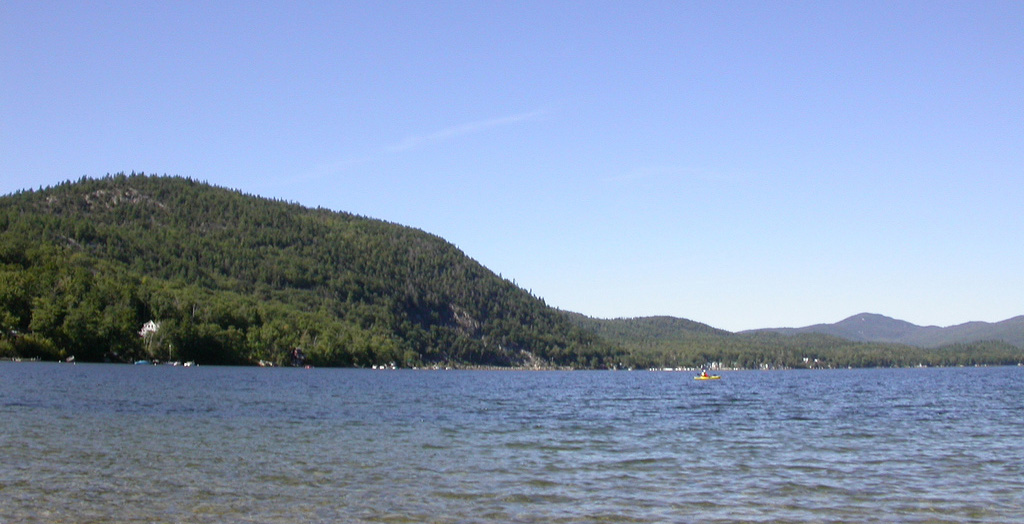
- Newfound Lake from Wellington State Park

- Location within New Hampshire Location within the United States
- Location: Grafton County, New Hampshire
- Coordinates: 43°39′46″N 71°46′31″W
- Primary inflows: Fowler River; Cockermouth River
- Primary outflows: Newfound River
- Basin countries: United States
- Max. length: 6.0 miles (9.7 km)
- Max. width: 2.4 miles (3.9 km)
- Surface area: 4,451 acres (18.01 km^{2})
- Max. depth: 183 feet (56 m)
- Surface elevation: 588 feet (179 m)
- Islands: Mayhew Island; Cliff Island; Belle Island; Loon Island
- Settlements: Bristol; Bridgewater; Alexandria; Hebron

Newfound Lake is located in Grafton County, New Hampshire, United States. It is situated in the Lakes Region of central New Hampshire, in the towns of Alexandria, Bridgewater, Bristol, and Hebron. Its area of 4,451 acres (18.0 km^{2}) places it behind only Lake Winnipesaukee and Squam Lake among lakes located entirely within New Hampshire, and fourth in the state overall, when Umbagog Lake on the Maine border is included.

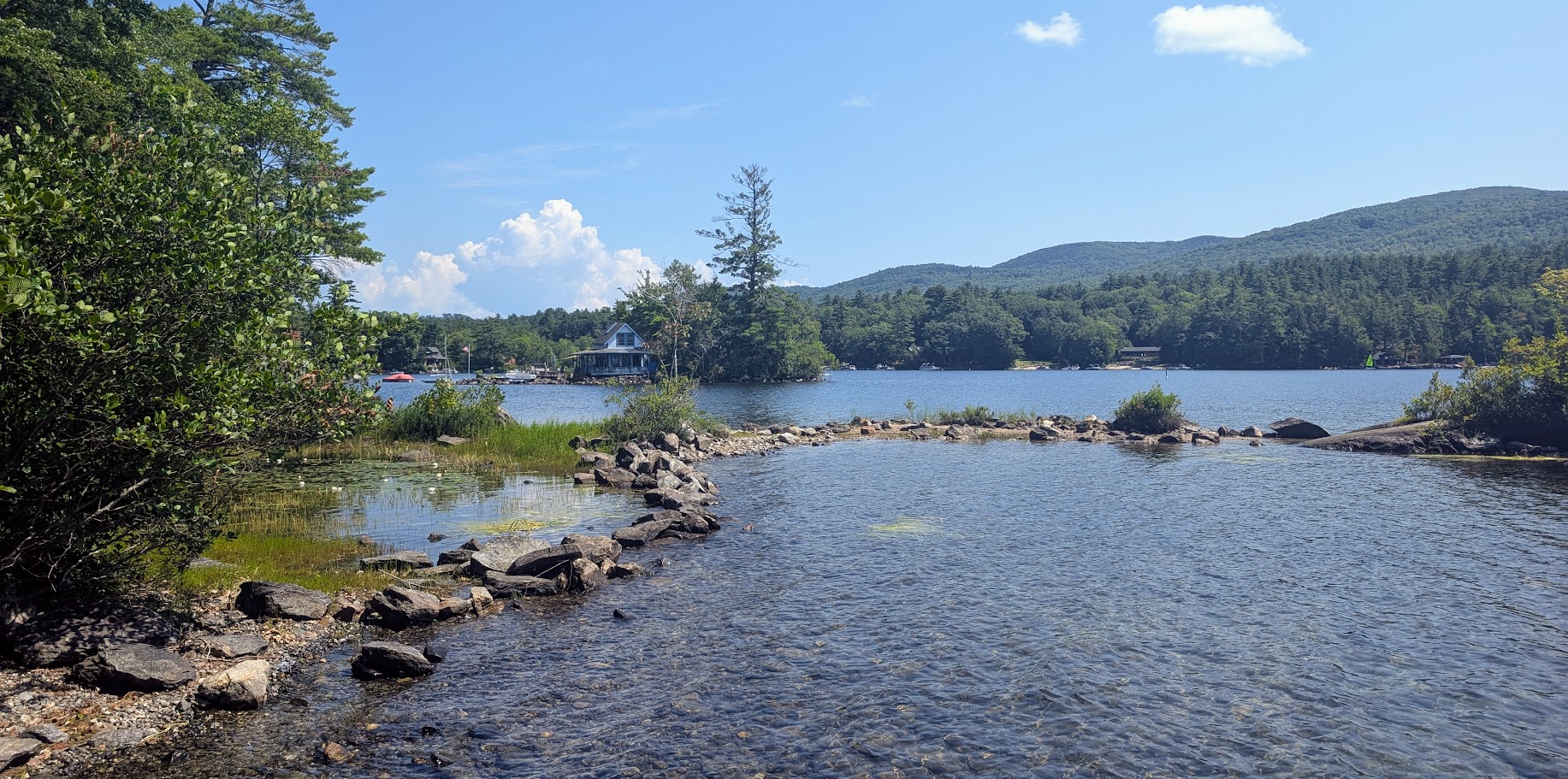
Sanborn Bay in Newfound Lake, Hebron, NH

== Geography ==
Newfound Lake has 22 miles (35 km) of shoreline. The lake is about 2.5 miles (4.0 km) wide and 6 miles (10 km) long. The deepest point is 183 feet (56 m). Major tributaries include the Fowler River and the Cockermouth River. Its outlet is the Newfound River, flowing through Bristol village into the Pemigewasset River. The lake volume is 98 billion gallons of water.

Wellington State Park, containing the largest freshwater swimming beach in the New Hampshire state park system, is a 204-acre (83 ha) property located on the lake's west shore in the town of Bristol.

The lake has four islands: Mayhew, Belle, Cliff, and Loon. Belle Island is a small island near the southern end of the lake. It was given to the state of New Hampshire by Camp Mowglis, a boys' camp located near the northern end of the lake, in 1942. According to a plaque posted on a rock on the island, the camp, known as the School of the Open, gave the island to the state "to remain perpetually in its natural beauty for a camping area especially for residents of New Hampshire, but for anyone who wants to use it. Take good care of it," the plaque reads.

== Name ==
A tradition says that the Native Americans called the lake "Pasquaney", meaning "the place where birch bark for canoes is found". In 1751, John Kendall and Jonathan Farwell participated in marking the western lands of the Masonian proprietors, where they referred to it as "Newfound Lake" or "Baker's Pond". Evidently this information did not get to Emmanuel Brown in time for publication of his New and Accurate Map of New Jersey, Pennsylvania, New York, and New England in 1752, as the lake was left nameless. In 1755, Thomas Jefferys published a Map of the Most Inhabited Parts of New England with the lake shown, but still without a name. In 1761, a map called the Accurate Map of his Majesty's Province of New Hampshire detailed the area, again with the lake nameless. In 1766 the New Chester proprietors refer to the lake in printed records as "Newfound pond". In 1791, Jeremy Belknap called it "New Chester Pond" in his History of New Hampshire.

Bristol native Fred Lewis Pattee romantically referred to Newfound by its supposed Indian name in his poem "Pasquaney Lake".

== Original landowners ==
The lake was originally fought over by John Mason and Peter Wheelright, who both claimed they owned a large plot of land with the lake being inside that plot. On November 7, 1629, Mason, a merchant from London, had the land from Newfound Lake to the Merrimack River in Massachusetts granted to him. Six months earlier, Reverend Peter Wheelright bought a large plot of land from indigenous people that was similar to the land John Mason received. The argument went to court and lasted for more than one hundred years.

Eventually, Mason's sixth heir, John Tufton Mason, won the case and sold the land to a syndicate known as the Masonian proprietors. On September 14, 1753, a syndicate living in Chester, New Hampshire, bought the land from the Mason proprietors, and the land became known as "New Chester". On February 12, 1788, the territory was divided up, and the territory north and east of Newfound Lake and the Newfound River was incorporated as Bridgewater. Two thirds of the lake was incorporated as Bristol on June 24, 1819.

== Fish ==
In 1890, the New Hampshire Fish and Game Commissioner stocked 15,000 landlocked salmon into the Fowler River, and in 1898, the NH Fish and Game Commission stocked 40,000 whitefish from Lake Superior.

In 1889, the state built a fish hatching house located on the Newfound River because of the "ease with which the trout could be dipped from the spawning beds and stripped of the spawn." The house was 20 by 34 feet (6.1 by 10.4 m) and could hold 750,000 eggs. In 1897 a larger house was constructed, which held 1,000,000 lake trout eggs, 125,000 brook trout eggs, and 65,000 landlocked salmon eggs all in its first year of operation. After years of declining trout numbers, a screen was built at the outlet of the lake to prevent the fish from swimming down the Newfound River.

Today, 22 species of fish are found in the Newfound Lake watershed:

- Brook trout
- Brown bullhead
- Burbot
- Chain pickerel
- Common shiner
- Creek chub
- Eastern blacknose dace
- Fallfish
- Golden shiner
- Lake trout
- Landlocked salmon
- Longnose dace
- Margined madtom
- Rainbow smelt
- Rainbow trout
- Redbreast sunfish
- Rock bass
- Round whitefish
- Slimy sculpin
- Smallmouth bass
- White sucker
- Yellow perch

Of these species, six - brook trout, burbot, lake trout, rainbow smelt, round whitefish, and slimy sculpin - were selected as needing special consideration by the 2006 New Hampshire Wildlife Action Plan. Selection is based on a species' population status, integral ecological function, or the ability to extrapolate from it to indicate a healthy aquatic ecosystem.

Every year between mid-March and early July the lake is stocked with additional fish. In 2011 this included 305 landlocked salmon, with a total weight of 2,622 pounds (1,189 kg), and 1,845 rainbow trout weighing 2,589 pounds (1,174 kg).

== Steamboats ==
Newfound Lake has hosted multiple steamboats in its waters. The first, the Pioneer owned by Capt. George W. Dow, was placed in the lake in 1865. It was destroyed by fire. In 1878, Edward M. Drake put the 56-foot (17 m) Cardigan on the lake, which plied until 1883. That same year, the 28-foot-long (8.5 m) Lady Helen joined it, but was also destroyed in a fire. In May 1900, the Stella-Marion was launched at Kimball's beach. It freighted mail and passengers until it too was destroyed in a fire on September 2, 1915.

== Lighthouses ==
Reed Lighthouse, built in 1932, is located on West Shore Road next to the Ledges. Newfound Lighthouse stands at the Paradise Point Lodge on Route 3A in Bridgewater.

== Lake conservation ==
The Newfound Lake Region Association (NLRA) was created in 1971 to protect the waters of Newfound Lake and the surrounding land. A total of 6,653 acres (2,692 ha) of land is currently in conservation.

== See also ==
- List of lakes in New Hampshire
