= Cockermouth River =

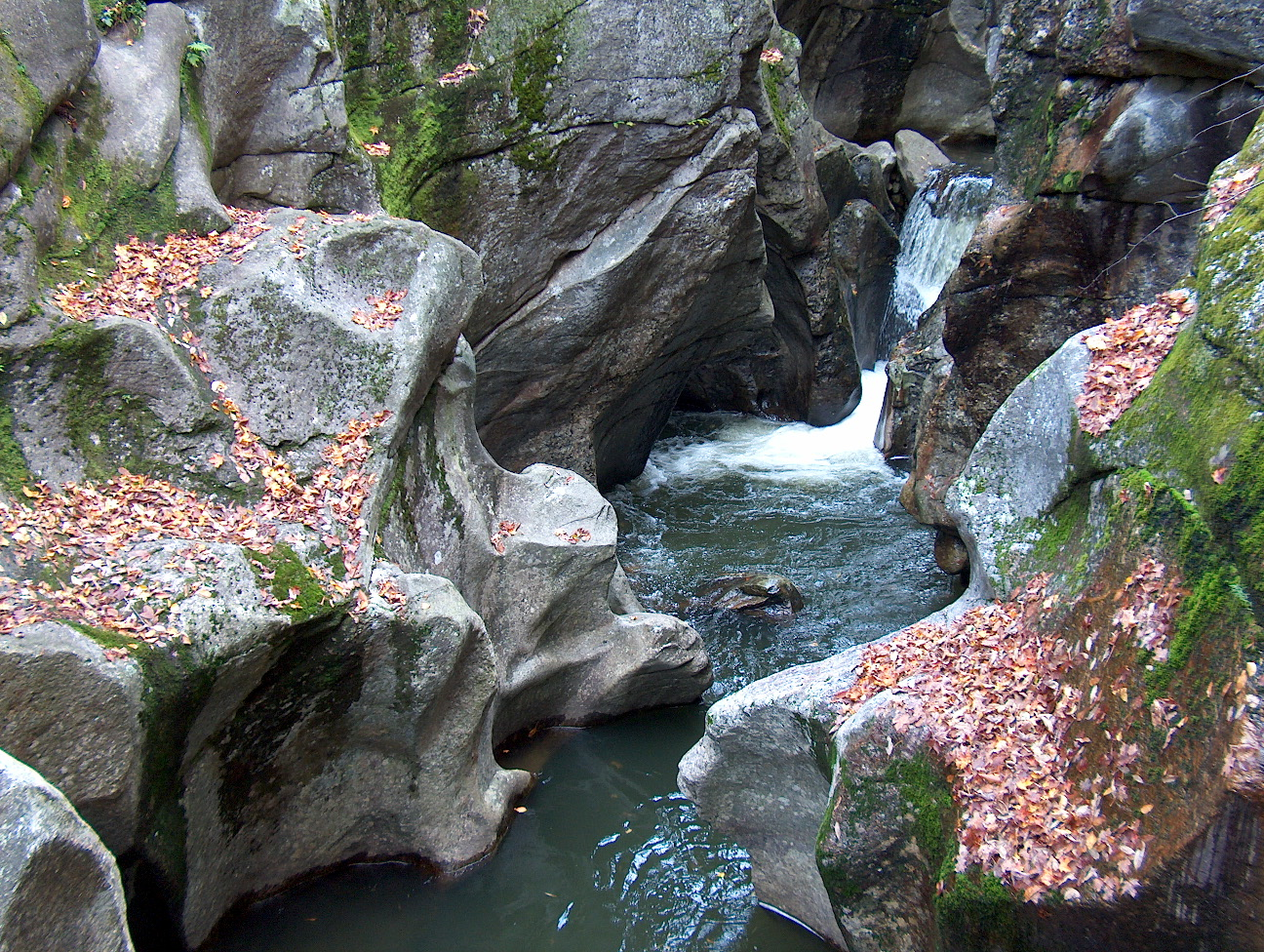
- The Cockermouth in Sculptured Rocks Natural Area

- Location within New Hampshire Location within the United States

Location
- Country: United States
- State: New Hampshire
- County: Grafton
- Towns: Groton, Hebron

Physical characteristics
- Source: Province Road State Forest
  - location: Groton
  - coordinates: 43°44′37″N 71°55′5″W
  - elevation: 1,500 ft (460 m)
- Mouth: Newfound Lake
  - location: Hebron
  - coordinates: 43°41′34″N 71°47′39″W
  - elevation: 588 ft (179 m)
- Length: 9.5 mi (15.3 km)

Basin features
- Tributaries
  - left: Wise Brook
  - right: Atwell Brook, Hardy Brook

The Cockermouth River is a 9.5-mile-long (15.3 km) stream located in central New Hampshire in the United States. It is the longest tributary of Newfound Lake, part of the Pemigewasset River and ultimately Merrimack River watersheds. The river takes its name from the "Cockermouth Grant", an early name for a portion of the town of Hebron.

The river begins in Province Road State Forest near the western boundary of Groton, New Hampshire, and proceeds southeast across the entire town of Groton. The river is closely paralleled by Sculptured Rocks Road, a very rough dirt road which gradually becomes more passable to automobiles as it proceeds downstream. The river passes through Sculptured Rocks Natural Area, a series of narrow, sharply carved rock formations that are a popular local swimming hole, then enters a broader valley as it passes the village center of Groton.

Continuing east, the Cockermouth River enters the town of Hebron and flows into Newfound Lake near the lake's northern end.

== See also ==
- List of rivers of New Hampshire
