= Bristol, New Hampshire =

- Town
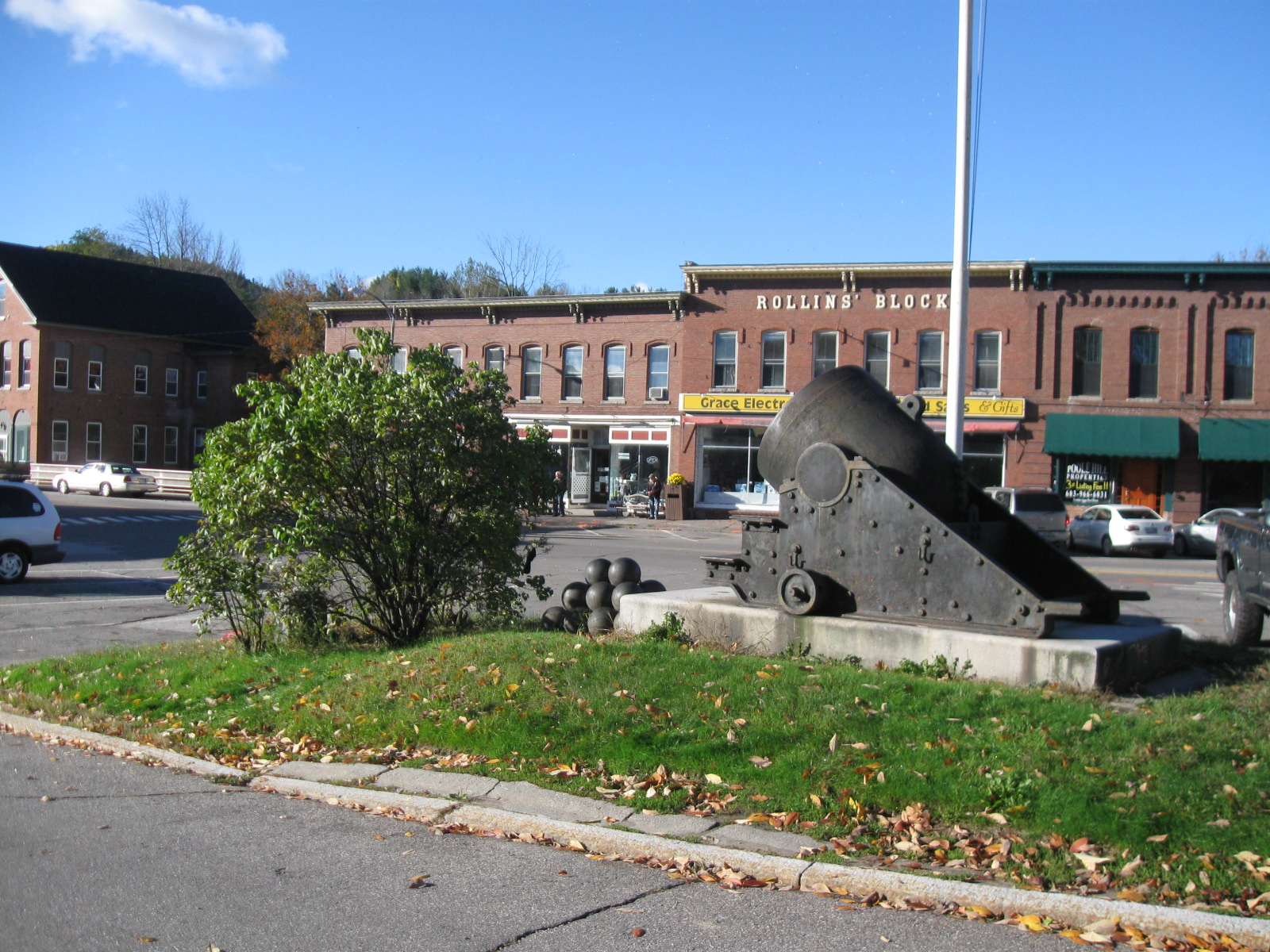
- Central Square in 2012

- Seal
- Motto: "The Gateway to Newfound Lake"
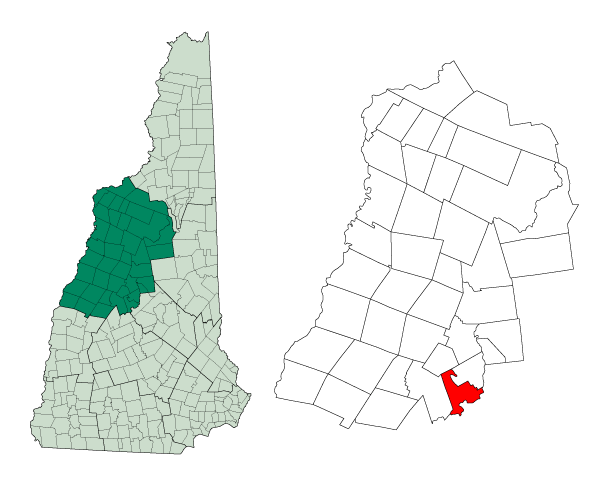
- Location in Grafton County, New Hampshire
- Coordinates: 43°37′08″N 71°43′48″W
- Country: United States
- State: New Hampshire
- County: Grafton
- Incorporated: 1819

Area
  - Total: 21.9 sq mi (56.8 km^{2})
  - Land: 16.8 sq mi (43.4 km^{2})
  - Water: 5.2 sq mi (13.4 km^{2}) 23.60%
- Elevation: 594 ft (181 m)

Population (2020)
  - Total: 3,244
  - Density: 194/sq mi (74.8/km^{2})
- Time zone: UTC-5 (Eastern)
  - Summer (DST): UTC-4 (Eastern)
- ZIP code: 03222
- Area code: 603
- FIPS code: 33-07700
- GNIS feature ID: 873552
- Website: www.bristolnh.gov

Bristol is a town in Grafton County, New Hampshire, United States. The population was 3,244 at the 2020 census. It is home to Wellington State Park, Sugar Hill State Forest, and Profile Falls on the Smith River. Surrounded by hills and lakes, Bristol includes the lower two-thirds of Newfound Lake, a resort area.

The primary settlement in town, where 1,911 people resided at the 2020 census, is defined by the U.S. Census Bureau as the Bristol census-designated place (CDP) and is located at the intersection of New Hampshire routes 3A and 104.

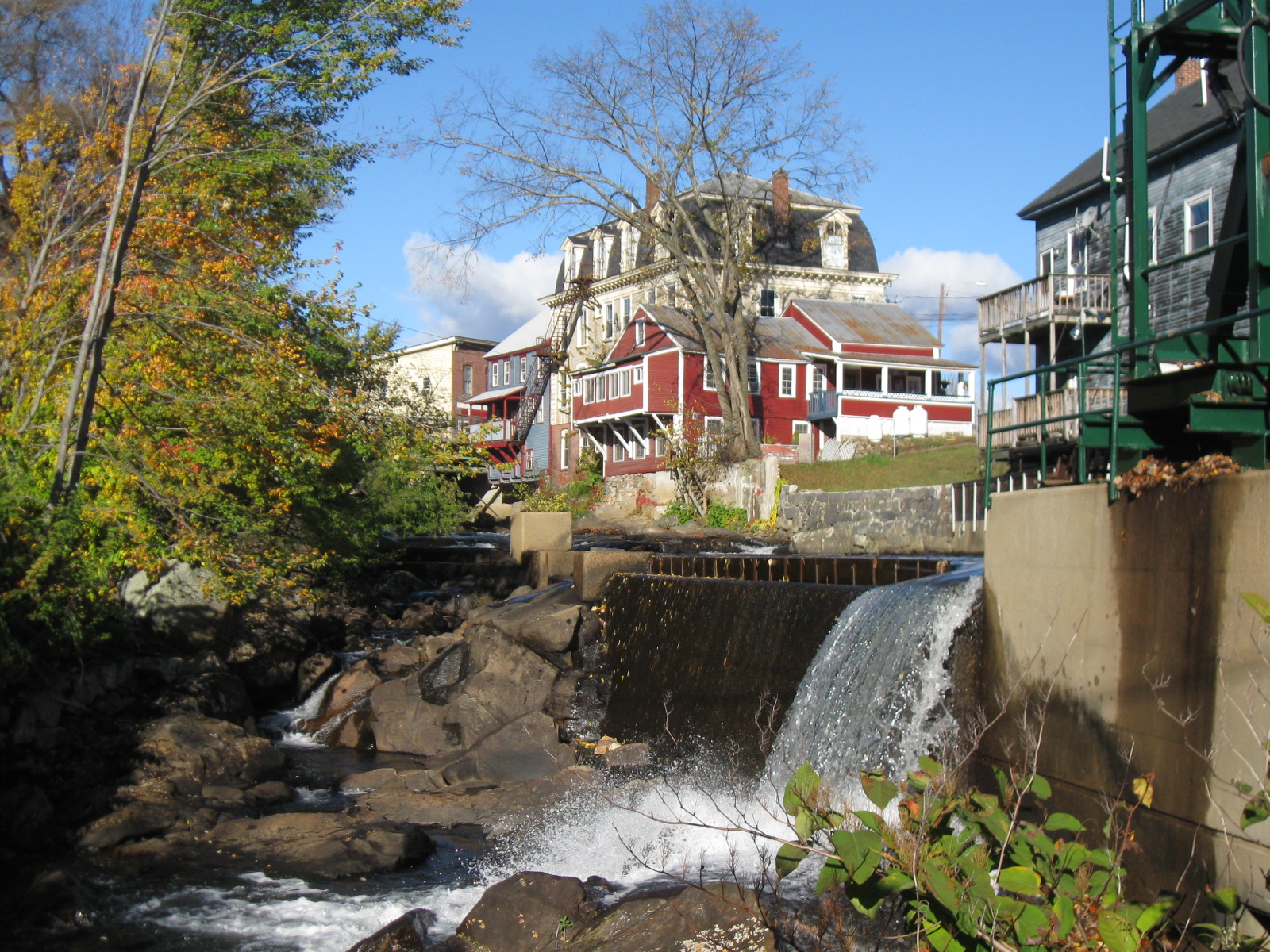
The Newfound River descending from the town center

== History ==
Bristol was taken from Bridgewater and New Chester (now Hill) and incorporated June 24, 1819. Colonel Peter Sleeper, Benjamin Emmons, and others commenced a settlement here in 1770.

Extensive deposits of fine sand or clay similar to the "Bristol Sand" used in Bristol, England, to make fine china and pottery gave the town its name. Here the sand was used to make a superior quality brick, marketed as Bristol brick. With water power from the Newfound River, the town was a center of manufacturing in the early days for goods such as paper, leather, woolens, flannel, bedsteads and piano stools.

On January 16, 1884, the town of Bristol voted to accept the gift of a library building and land from Josiah Minot and Solomon Sleeper and to manage and maintain a public library. The Minot–Sleeper Library became the first building erected to specifically house a public library in the Lakes Region at the time, when it was officially opened to the community in 1885. On August 15, 2012, a groundbreaking ceremony was held in celebration of the library's expansion. In February 2013, the new addition was ready for use.

Bristol is one of four towns with shoreline on Newfound Lake, which has been a tourist destination since the mid-19th century. Farmers at first rented rooms and provided meals, but in the 1870s, hotels including the Hotel Bristol and G. G. Brown Hotel were built. In 1874, Bristol was the terminus of the Franklin and Bristol Branch railroad. The New Hampshire Central Railroad was planned to pass through Bristol. In the 1920s, W. F. Darling created a compound of about one hundred cottages for rent, first known as Hiland Park and later as Bungalo Village. In 2004, the compound was sold to a proprietor who sold individual cottages to permanent owners.

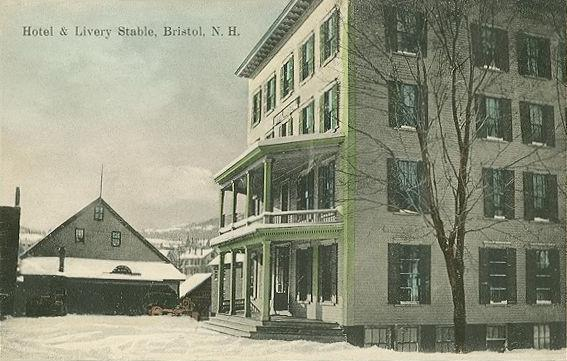
The Hotel Bristol in 1911

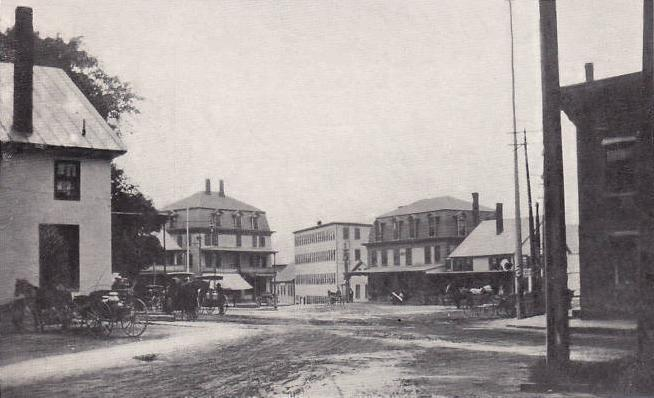
Central Square in 1906

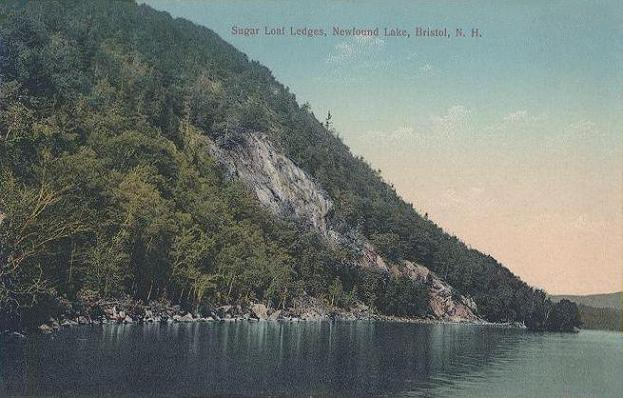
The Ledges in 1912

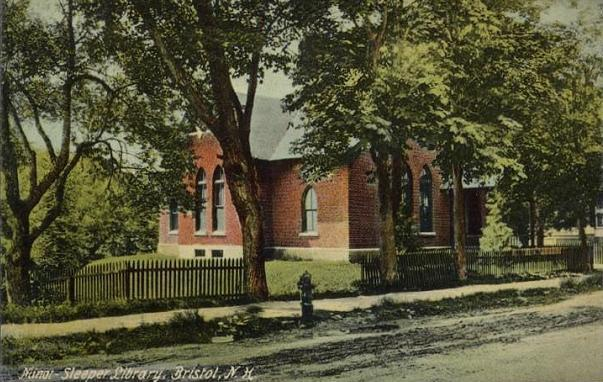
Minot–Sleeper Library c. 1910

In 2022, Bristol inaugurated a new solar array. Local media highlighted the array in the context of town's energy independence, which dated from the 1800s when hydropower provided all the town's energy.

== Geography ==
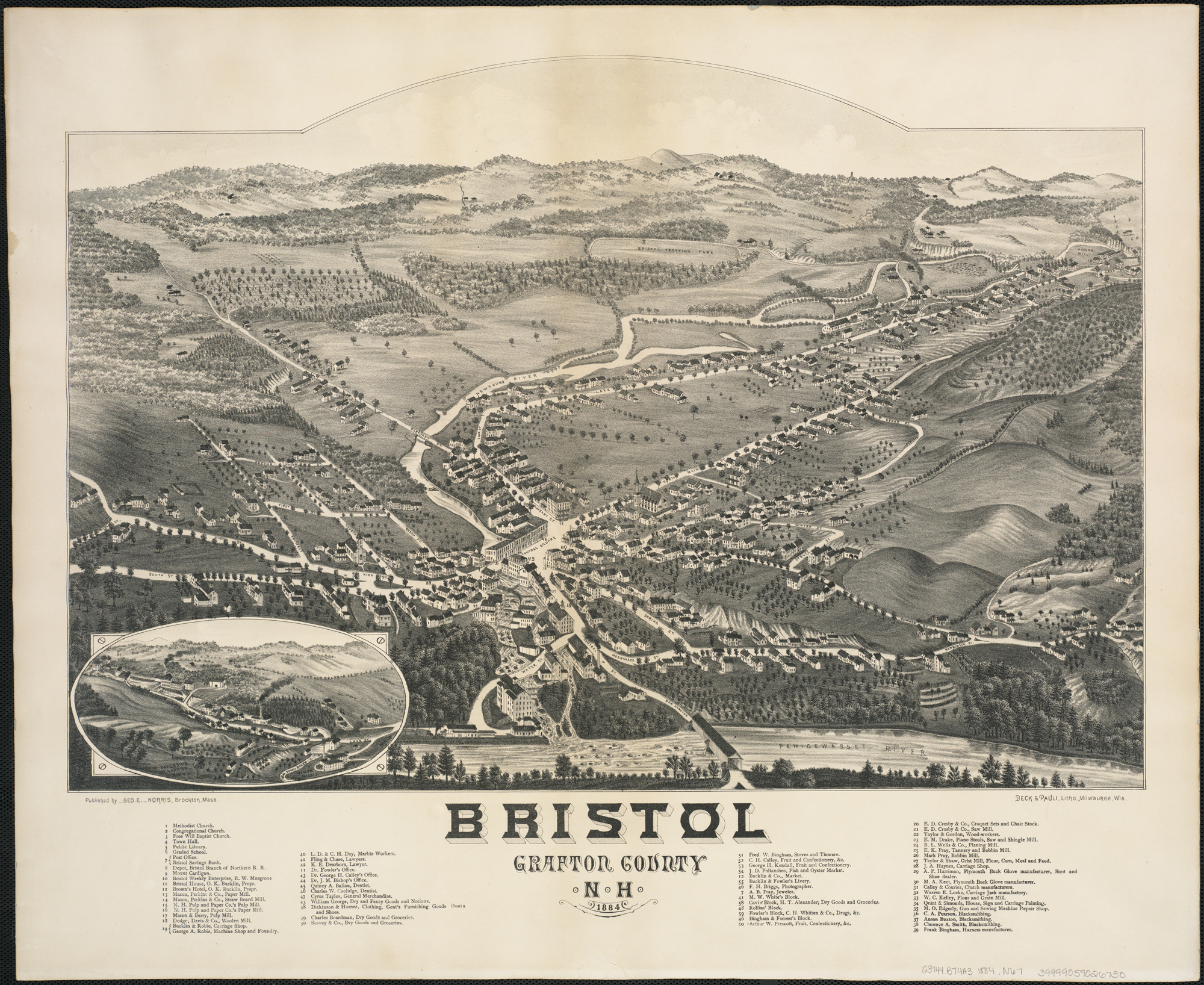
1884 bird's-eye view of Bristol

According to the United States Census Bureau, the town has a total area of 21.9 square miles (56.8 km^{2}), of which 16.8 square miles (43.4 km^{2}) are land and 5.2 square miles (13.4 km^{2}) are water, comprising 23.60% of the town. Bristol is drained by the Pemigewasset River (forming the southeastern boundary of the town), the Smith River (on the town's short southern boundary) and the Newfound River, draining Newfound Lake and most of the center of town. The highest point in town is Bristol Peak, elevation 1,803 feet (550 m) above sea level. Bristol lies fully within the Merrimack River watershed.

Bristol is served by state routes 3A and 104.

Climate data for Bristol, New Hampshire(1991–2020)
Month	Jan	Feb	Mar	Apr	May	Jun	Jul	Aug	Sep	Oct	Nov	Dec	Year
Mean daily maximum °F	27.2	30.6	38.8	52.3	64.3	72.8	78.4	76.9	69.9	56.1	44.1	32.9	53.7
Daily mean °F	18.3	21.1	29.2	42.0	54.2	63.4	69.7	68.4	61.4	48.7	37.3	25.8	45.0
Mean daily minimum °F	11.1	13.4	21.5	33.7	45.5	55.3	61.8	60.9	54.4	42.8	32.4	20.1	37.7
Average precipitation inches	2.98	2.72	3.55	3.83	3.51	4.47	4.29	4.11	3.59	5.43	3.90	4.36	46.74
Mean daily maximum °C	−2.7	−0.8	3.8	11.3	17.9	22.7	25.8	24.9	21.1	13.4	6.7	0.5	12.0
Daily mean °C	−7.6	−6.1	−1.6	5.6	12.3	17.4	20.9	20.2	16.3	9.3	2.9	−3.4	7.2
Mean daily minimum °C	−11.6	−10.3	−5.8	0.9	7.5	12.9	16.6	16.1	12.4	6.0	0.2	−6.6	3.2
Average precipitation mm	76	69	90	97	89	114	109	104	91	138	99	111	1,187
Source 1: NOAA
Source 2: Climate data(Temperatures)

== Demographics ==
Historical population
Census	Pop.	Note	%±
1820	675		—
1830	799		18.4%
1840	1,153		44.3%
1850	1,103		−4.3%
1860	1,124		1.9%
1870	1,416		26.0%
1880	1,352		−4.5%
1890	1,524		12.7%
1900	1,600		5.0%
1910	1,478		−7.6%
1920	1,428		−3.4%
1930	1,610		12.7%
1940	1,632		1.4%
1950	1,586		−2.8%
1960	1,470		−7.3%
1970	1,670		13.6%
1980	2,198		31.6%
1990	2,537		15.4%
2000	3,033		19.6%
2010	3,054		0.7%
2020	3,244		6.2%
U.S. Decennial Census

As of the census of 2010, there were 3,054 people, 1,283 households, and 851 families residing in the town. There were 2,488 housing units, of which 1,205, or 48.4%, were vacant. 1,089 of the vacant units were for seasonal or recreational use. The racial makeup of the town was 96.9% white, 0.3% African American, 0.2% Native American, 0.7% Asian, 0.0% Native Hawaiian or Pacific Islander, 0.3% some other race, and 1.6% from two or more races. 1.1% of the population were Hispanic or Latino of any race.

Of the 1,283 households, 29.3% had children under the age of 18 living with them, 49.0% were headed by married couples living together, 11.1% had a female householder with no husband present, and 33.7% were non-families. 26.7% of all households were made up of individuals, and 9.5% were someone living alone who was 65 years of age or older. The average household size was 2.36, and the average family size was 2.81.

In the town, 21.5% of the population were under the age of 18, 7.0% were from 18 to 24, 23.6% from 25 to 44, 32.4% from 45 to 64, and 15.5% were 65 years of age or older. The median age was 43.5 years. For every 100 females, there were 98.2 males. For every 100 females age 18 and over, there were 95.3 males.

For the period 2011–2015, the estimated median annual income for a household was $50,080, and the median income for a family was $56,161. Male full-time workers had a median income of $43,627 versus $35,921 for females. The per capita income for the town was $25,353. 8.7% of the population and 5.0% of families were below the poverty line. 15.4% of the population under the age of 18 and 4.3% of those 65 or older were living in poverty.

== Education ==
The town is within the Newfound Area School District. Schools in Bristol include Bristol Elementary School, Newfound Memorial Middle School, and Newfound Regional High School.

== Notable people ==
- Luther Atwood (1820–1868), chemist in the oil industry
- Nathaniel S. Berry (1796–1894), 28th governor of New Hampshire
- John Cheever (1912–1982), writer
- E. Maude Ferguson (1883–1932), first woman to serve in the New Hampshire Senate
- Benjamin Flanders (1816–1896), Reconstruction governor of Louisiana; mayor of New Orleans
- Luther C. Ladd (1843–1861), frequently cited as the first Union soldier killed in the American Civil War
- Lenny McNab (c. 1971), Food Network chef
- Fred Lewis Pattee (1863–1950), writer and professor of American literature; born and raised in Bristol

== See also ==
- New Hampshire Historical Marker No. 269: E. Maude Ferguson, New Hampshire's First Woman State Senator
