= Dartmouth–Lake Sunapee Region =

Coordinates: 43°29′21″N 72°08′15″W

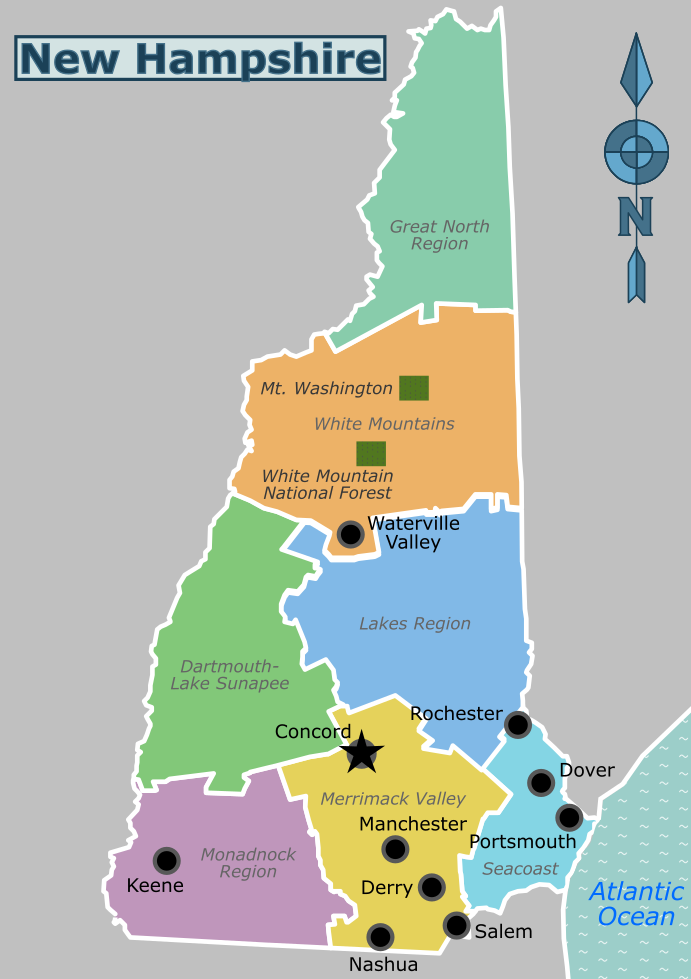
In this N.H. Department of Transportation map from 2018, The Dartmouth-Lake Sunapee Region (in green) is located in the west-central part of the state.

The Dartmouth–Lake Sunapee area of the U.S. state of New Hampshire lies in the west-central portion of the state, along the Connecticut River Valley. It includes all of Sullivan County, and parts of Merrimack County and Grafton County. The region shares its name with Dartmouth College, a prestigious Ivy League institution, and Lake Sunapee, a popular tourist destination. Interstate 89 forms the main freeway connecting the region to other parts of New Hampshire, as well as to nearby Vermont. Lebanon, Hanover, and Claremont are the three most populous communities in the region.

== Cities and towns ==
- Acworth
- Bradford
- Canaan
- Charlestown
- Claremont
- Cornish
- Croydon
- Danbury
- Dorchester
- Enfield
- Goshen
- Grafton
- Grantham
- Groton
- Hanover
- Hill
- Langdon
- Lebanon
- Lempster
- Lyme
- New London
- Newbury
- Newport
- Orange
- Orford
- Plainfield
- Salisbury
- Springfield
- Sunapee
- Sutton
- Unity
- Warner
- Washington
- Wentworth
- Wilmot

== Attractions ==
- Cardigan Mountain State Park
- Dartmouth College
- Lake Sunapee
- Mount Sunapee
- Mount Kearsarge (Merrimack County, New Hampshire)
- Pillsbury State Park
- Rollins State Park
- Saint-Gaudens National Historical Park
- Sculptured Rocks Natural Area
- Wadleigh State Park
- Winslow State Park
