= Mount Sunapee =

Mountain in New Hampshire, United States

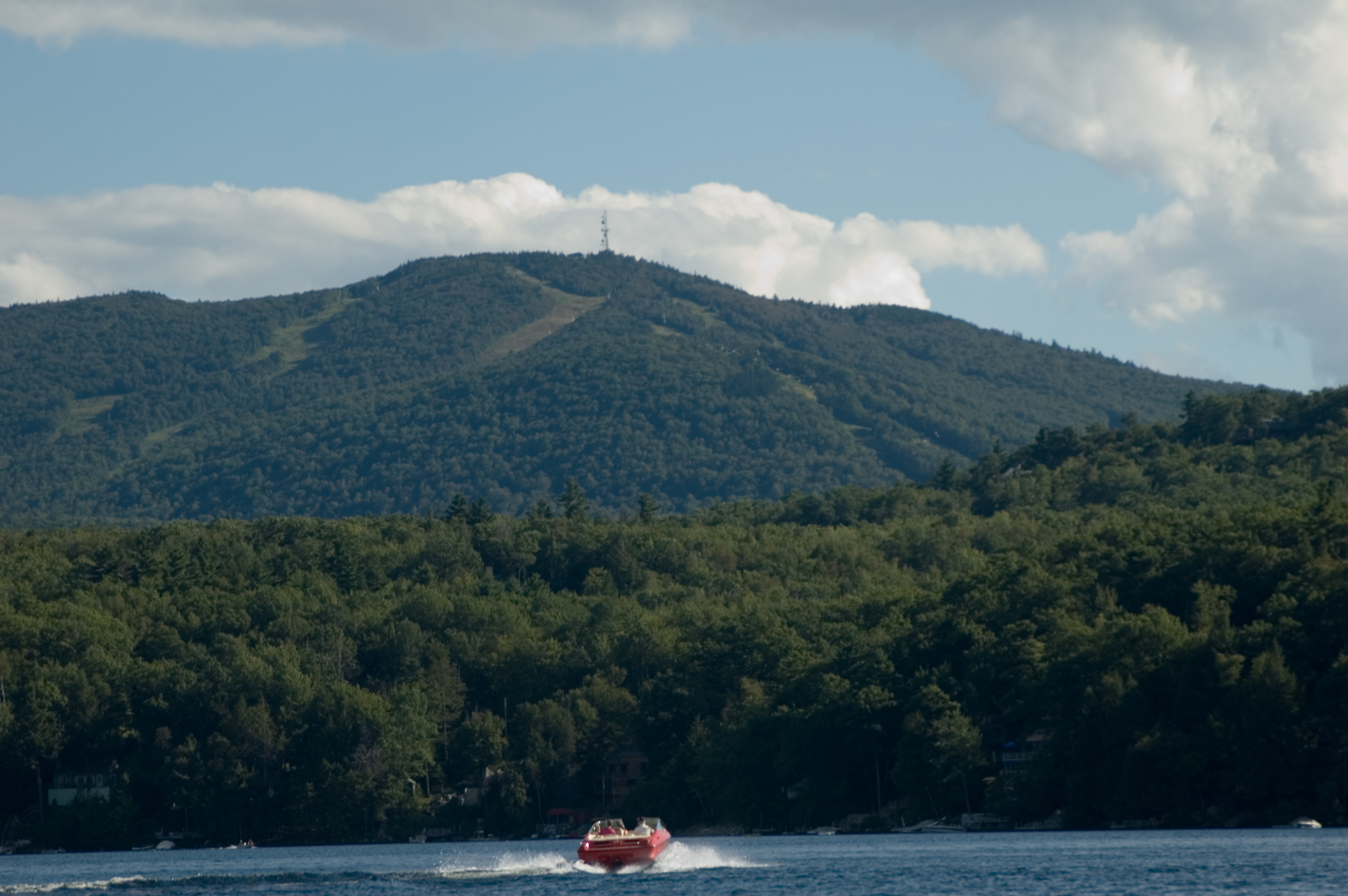
- View from Lake Sunapee

Highest point
- Elevation: 2,726 ft (831 m)
- Prominence: 1,466 ft (447 m)
- Coordinates: 43°18′49″N 72°4′27″W

Geography
- Location: Newbury / Goshen, New Hampshire, U.S.
- Topo map: USGS Newport Quadrangle

Climbing
- Easiest route: Andrew Brook Trail

Mount Sunapee (or Sunapee Mountain on federal maps) is a 5-mile-long (8.0 km) mountain ridge in the towns of Newbury and Goshen in western New Hampshire, United States. Its highest peak, at the north end of the mountain, is 2,726 feet (831 m) above sea level. The mountain has three secondary peaks, White Ledges at 2,716 ft (828 m); North Peak at 2,280 ft (695 m); and South Peak at 2,608 ft (795 m). The north end of the mountain, including the summit, is within Mount Sunapee State Park, which encompasses 3.85 square miles (10.0 km^{2}) and is home to the popular Mount Sunapee Resort. The mountain extends south to Pillsbury State Park in the towns of Goshen and Washington.

The entire mountain ridge is traversed by the Monadnock-Sunapee Greenway, a hiking trail that links the summit of Sunapee with that of Mount Monadnock, 50 miles (80 km) to the south in the town of Jaffrey, New Hampshire. Also crossing the summit in an east–west route is a section of the Sunapee-Ragged-Kearsarge Greenway, a 75-mile (121 km) trail linking ten towns in west-central New Hampshire as it circles the Lake Sunapee region and crosses the summits of the three mountains for which it is named. The two Greenway trails meet at Lake Solitude and use the same trail to the summit.

== Hydrology ==
The ridgeline of Sunapee Mountain forms the divide between the Merrimack River and Connecticut River watersheds. Lake Solitude, a 6-acre (2.4 ha) body of water, lies just 0.2 miles (0.3 km) southeast of the White Ledges summit, at an elevation of 2,510 feet (770 m). The lake flows into Andrew Brook, a tributary of the Warner River in the Merrimack River watershed. Farther south along the ridge, the east slopes of the mountain drain via the West Branch of the Warner River into the Warner and Merrimack rivers.

The northern and western sides of the mountain drain to the Connecticut River. Johnson Brook flows down the north slopes of the mountain, entering Lake Sunapee, the outlet of which (the Sugar River) flows west to the Connecticut in Claremont. On the western slopes of the mountain, Gunnison Brook, Blood Brook, and Baker Brook flow to the South Branch of the Sugar River. The southwestern end of the mountain drains via Cherry Brook into the headwaters of the Ashuelot River, which reaches the Connecticut River near the Massachusetts border.

== Recreation ==
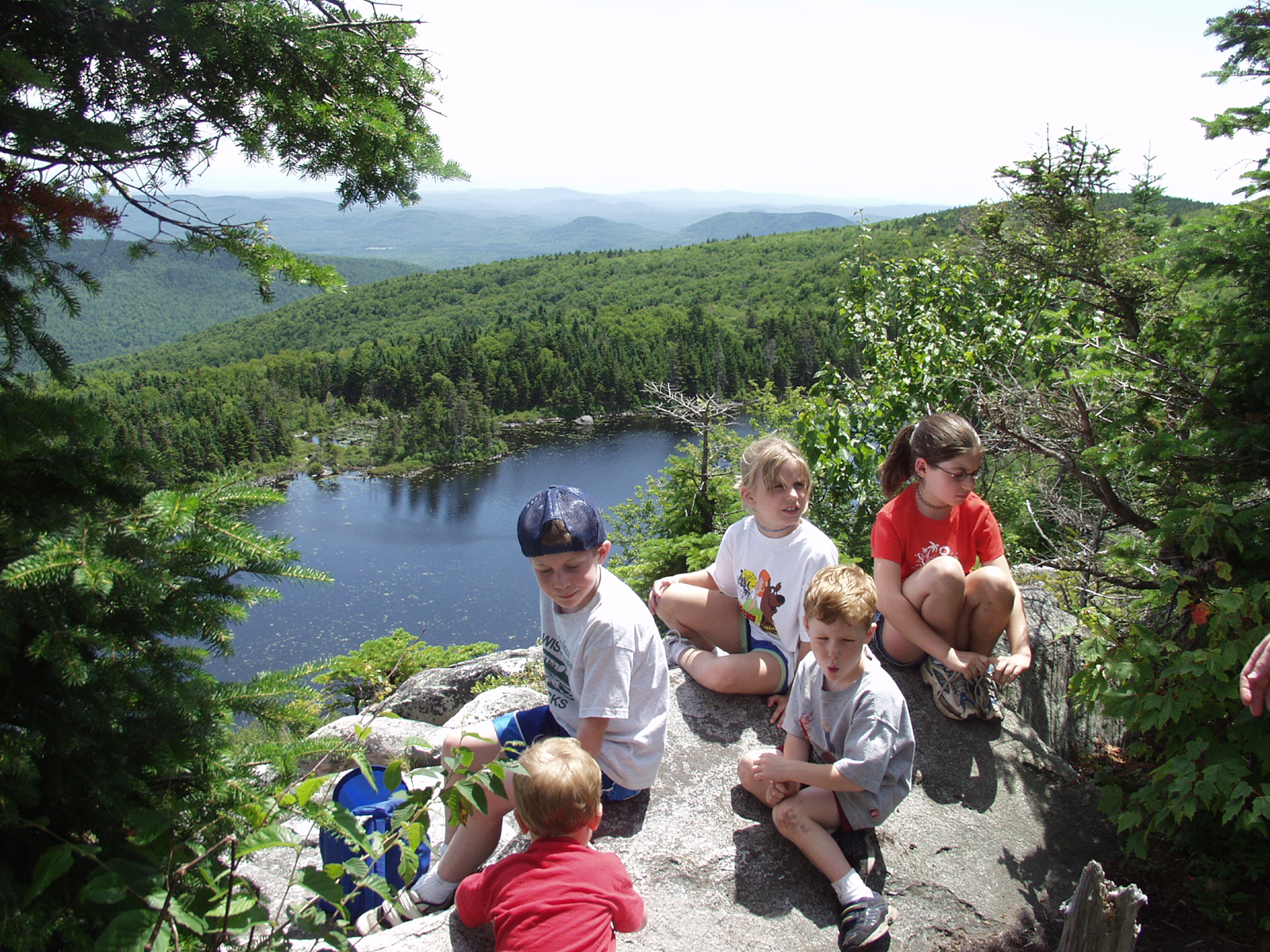
Hikers viewing Lake Solitude (2510' above sea level) from White Ledges

Skiing and snowboard riding are popular winter activities at Mount Sunapee Resort & Ski Area. The ski area lies within Mount Sunapee State Park, but in 1998 the state leased the 968-acre (392 ha) ski area of the park to be operated by Tim and Dianne Mueller, who own Okemo Mountain Resort. In 2018 the operations contract was bought by Vail Resorts.

The state park's extensive trail system is used in all seasons for hiking and in winter for snowshoeing. The park is linked to Pillsbury State Park and southern New Hampshire by the 50-mile (80 km) Monadnock-Sunapee Greenway and to the ten-town Lake Sunapee region by the 75-mile (121 km) "emerald necklace" of the Sunapee-Ragged-Kearsarge (SRK) Greenway which connects Mt. Sunapee to Wadleigh State Park in Sutton and to Winslow and Rollins State Parks on Mount Kearsarge in Warner and Wilmot. From the ski area parking, the Summit Trail travels 2 miles (3 km) along the western slope to the summit, where it meets the Solitude Trail for a 1 mile (1.6 km) walk to Lake Solitude and White Ledges. The Solitude Trail then links to several trails, notably the popular Andrew Brook Trail and the steeper Newbury Trail, both heading eastward, and to the M-S Greenway as it heads south along Sunapee Mountain toward Pillsbury State Park.

== Climate ==
According to the Köppen Climate Classification system, Mount Sunapee has a warm-summer humid continental climate, abbreviated "Dfb" on climate maps. The hottest temperature recorded at Mount Sunapee was 98 °F (36.7 °C) on July 10, 1988, while the coldest temperature recorded was −26 °F (−32.2 °C) on January 8, 1968. A weather station is located near the base of the mountain.

Climate data for Mount Sunapee, New Hampshire (elevation 1275 ft), 1991–2020 normals, extremes 1957–2015
| Month | Jan | Feb | Mar | Apr | May | Jun | Jul | Aug | Sep | Oct | Nov | Dec | Year |
|---|---|---|---|---|---|---|---|---|---|---|---|---|---|
| Record high °F (°C) | 63 (17) | 61 (16) | 82 (28) | 88 (31) | 88 (31) | 93 (34) | 98 (37) | 93 (34) | 91 (33) | 85 (29) | 72 (22) | 67 (19) | 98 (37) |
| Mean maximum °F (°C) | 50.0 (10.0) | 50.9 (10.5) | 61.4 (16.3) | 76.5 (24.7) | 83.7 (28.7) | 87.2 (30.7) | 88.7 (31.5) | 87.1 (30.6) | 81.8 (27.7) | 73.0 (22.8) | 64.6 (18.1) | 53.0 (11.7) | 90.1 (32.3) |
| Mean daily maximum °F (°C) | 28.7 (−1.8) | 31.5 (−0.3) | 39.7 (4.3) | 53.4 (11.9) | 66.4 (19.1) | 74.5 (23.6) | 78.9 (26.1) | 77.3 (25.2) | 70.2 (21.2) | 56.8 (13.8) | 45.0 (7.2) | 34.0 (1.1) | 54.7 (12.6) |
| Daily mean °F (°C) | 20.8 (−6.2) | 23.0 (−5.0) | 30.8 (−0.7) | 43.1 (6.2) | 55.3 (12.9) | 64.2 (17.9) | 69.0 (20.6) | 67.3 (19.6) | 60.2 (15.7) | 47.7 (8.7) | 37.0 (2.8) | 27.0 (−2.8) | 45.4 (7.5) |
| Mean daily minimum °F (°C) | 12.9 (−10.6) | 14.6 (−9.7) | 22.0 (−5.6) | 32.7 (0.4) | 44.2 (6.8) | 54.0 (12.2) | 59.2 (15.1) | 57.4 (14.1) | 50.1 (10.1) | 38.6 (3.7) | 29.0 (−1.7) | 19.9 (−6.7) | 36.2 (2.3) |
| Mean minimum °F (°C) | −7.2 (−21.8) | −4.4 (−20.2) | 2.0 (−16.7) | 21.4 (−5.9) | 31.6 (−0.2) | 40.7 (4.8) | 47.7 (8.7) | 44.7 (7.1) | 35.3 (1.8) | 24.9 (−3.9) | 13.8 (−10.1) | −0.1 (−17.8) | −9.9 (−23.3) |
| Record low °F (°C) | −26 (−32) | −20 (−29) | −11 (−24) | 9 (−13) | 22 (−6) | 32 (0) | 38 (3) | 30 (−1) | 25 (−4) | 16 (−9) | 5 (−15) | −23 (−31) | −26 (−32) |
| Average precipitation inches (mm) | 3.34 (85) | 3.07 (78) | 3.74 (95) | 4.21 (107) | 3.91 (99) | 4.41 (112) | 4.42 (112) | 3.66 (93) | 4.18 (106) | 5.52 (140) | 3.73 (95) | 4.27 (108) | 48.46 (1,230) |
| Average snowfall inches (cm) | 18.4 (47) | 24.6 (62) | 12.3 (31) | 4.7 (12) | 0.0 (0.0) | 0.0 (0.0) | 0.0 (0.0) | 0.0 (0.0) | 0.0 (0.0) | 1.2 (3.0) | 3.6 (9.1) | 20.6 (52) | 85.4 (216.1) |
| Average precipitation days (≥ 0.01 in) | 11.4 | 8.4 | 10.1 | 9.5 | 13.3 | 13.7 | 12.5 | 10.8 | 10.3 | 11.9 | 10.8 | 11.5 | 134.2 |
| Average snowy days (≥ 0.1 in) | 6.1 | 5.2 | 4.2 | 1.1 | 0.0 | 0.0 | 0.0 | 0.0 | 0.0 | 0.3 | 1.0 | 5.4 | 23.3 |
Source 1: NOAA
Source 2: XMAICS2 (mean maxima/minima 1981–2010)
