= Monadnock-Sunapee Greenway =

Hiking trail that traverses the highlands of southern New Hampshire

Coordinates: 43°14′18″N 72°04′50″W

Monadnock-Sunapee Greenway Trail
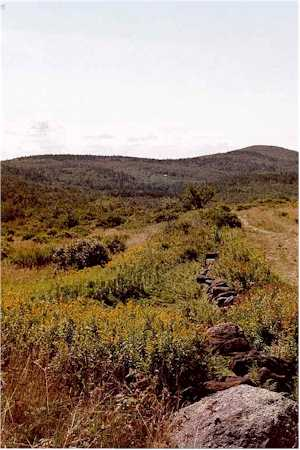
- Hubbard Hill heath barrens, Monadnock-Sunapee Greenway
- Length: 50 mi (80 km)
- Location: Cheshire / Merrimack / Sullivan counties, New Hampshire, USA
- Use: hiking, snowshoeing, other
- Highest point: Mount Monadnock, 3,165 ft (965 m)
- Lowest point: Seavers Reservoir, 1,200 ft (370 m)
- Difficulty: moderately difficult
- Season: easiest late spring to early fall
- Hazards: deer ticks, weather

The Monadnock-Sunapee Greenway (MSG) is a 50-mile (80 km) hiking trail that traverses the highlands of southern New Hampshire from Mount Monadnock in Jaffrey to Mount Sunapee in Newbury. Located approximately 27 miles (43 km) from the city of Concord, New Hampshire, the trail traverses a rural, heavily glaciated and metamorphic upland studded with lakes, heath barrens, the rocky summits of several monadnocks, and dense woodland of the northern hardwood forest type. The trail is maintained primarily through the efforts of the Monadnock-Sunapee Greenway Trail Club.

Notable features along the route include the summit of Mount Monadnock; Eliza Adams Gorge; the classic New England town commons of Nelson and Washington; the New Hampshire Audubon Society's Nye Meadow Refuge; Otter Brook and Andorra Forest; the high heath barrens of Pitcher Mountain, Hubbard Hill, and Jackson Hill; Lovewell Mountain; 8 miles (13 km) of the Sunapee Ridge; and Lake Solitude, a mountaintop tarn near the summit of Mount Sunapee. A number of lakes, reservoirs, ponds, and other wetlands are also located along the route.

== Trail description ==
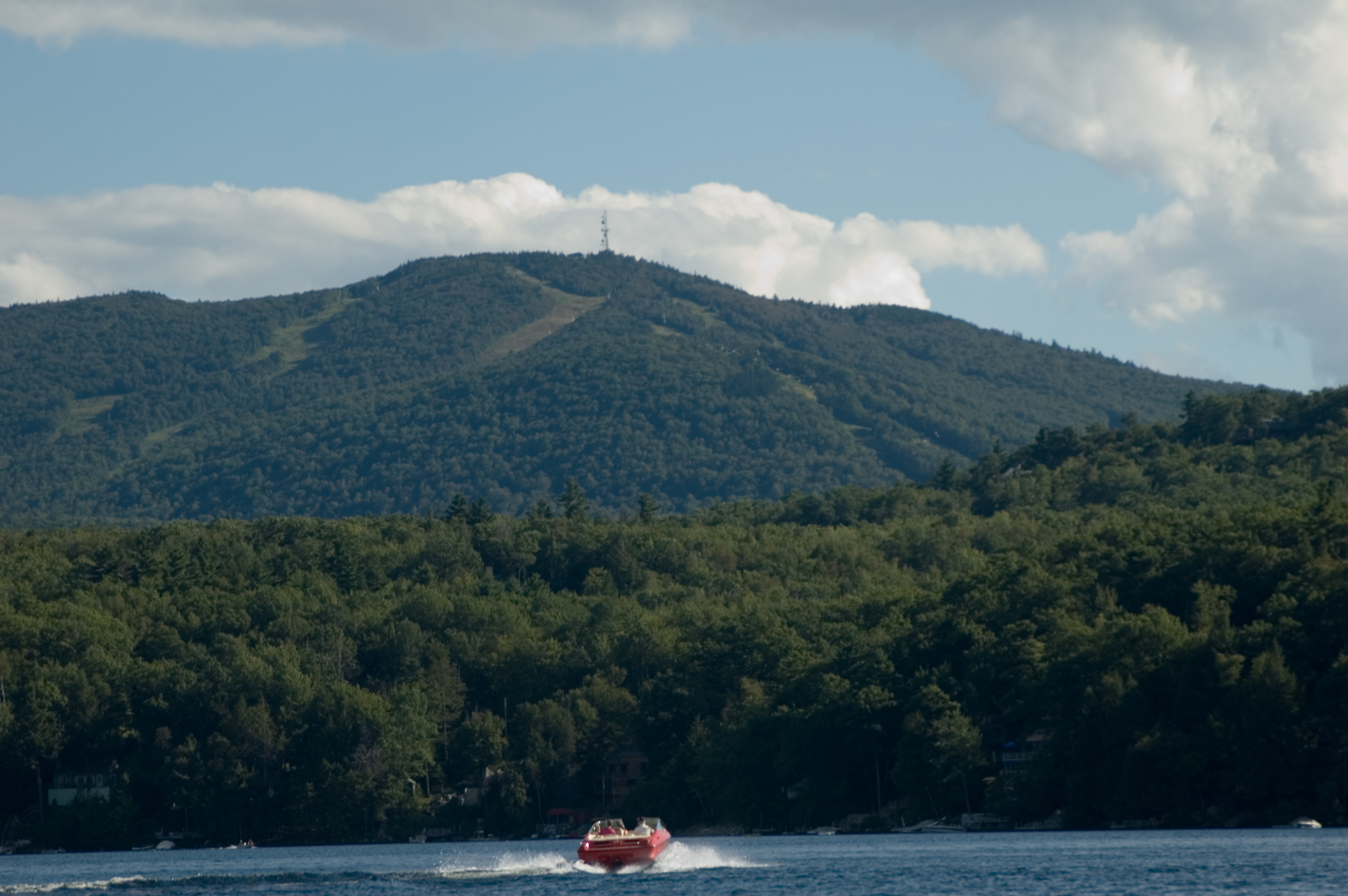
Mount Sunapee

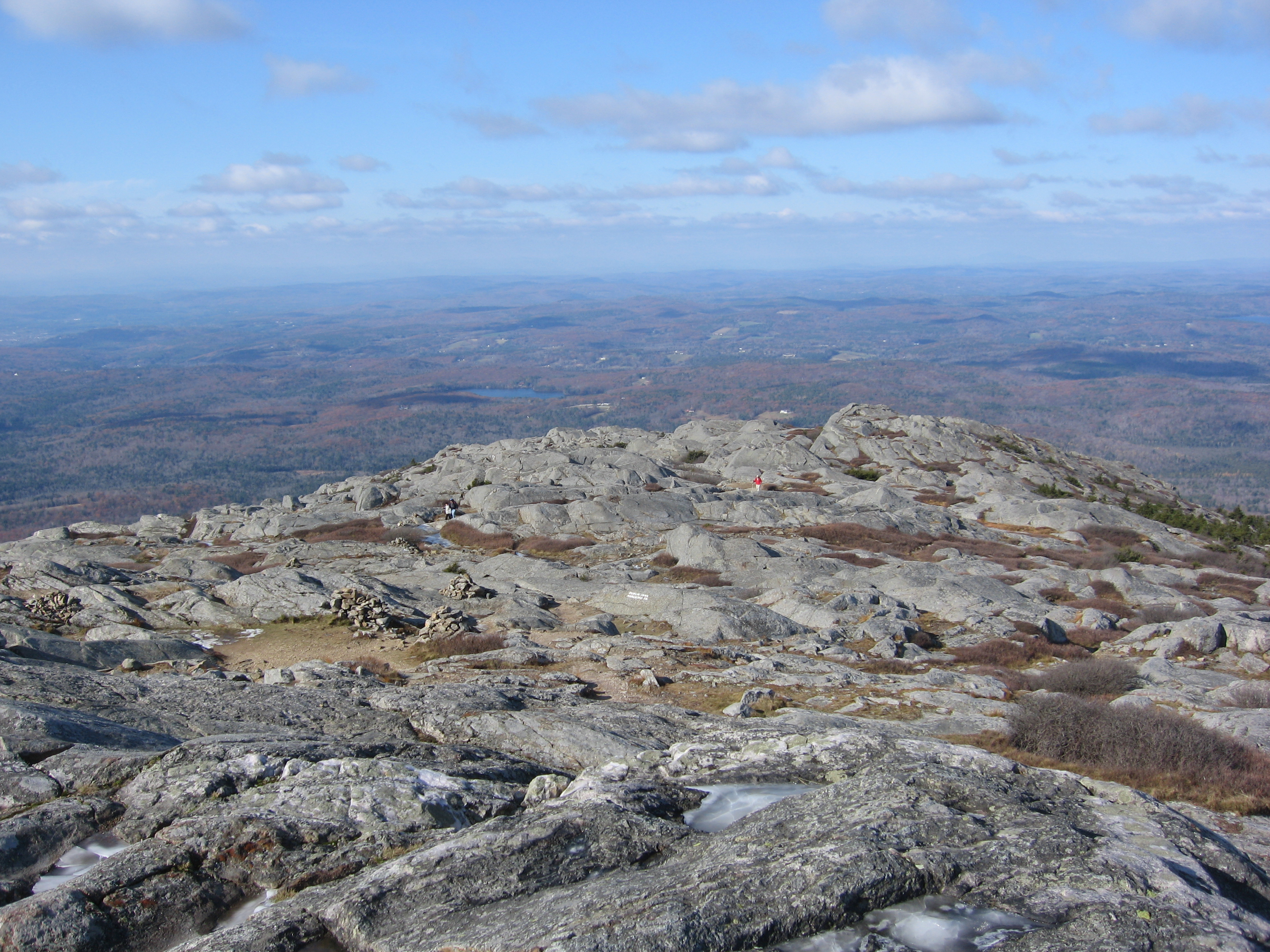
Summit of Mount Monadnock

The MSGT extends from the summit of Mount Monadnock to the summit of Mount Sunapee through Cheshire County, Sullivan County, and Merrimack County. The MSG passes through the following incorporated communities: Jaffrey, Dublin, Harrisville, Nelson, Stoddard, Washington, Goshen, and Newbury, New Hampshire.

Mount Monadnock, the southern terminus of the MSG, is the most prominent peak of southeast New England. At 3,165 feet (965 m) high, it is 1,000 feet (300 m) higher than any mountain peak within 30 miles (48 km) and rises 2,000 feet (610 m) above the surrounding landscape. Its bare, rocky summit provides expansive views. Eliza Adams Gorge is a scenic and rocky eastern hemlock-clad ravine located just below the dam spillway on Howe Reservoir. The Nye Meadow Refuge is an important great blue heron rookery managed by the Audubon Society of New Hampshire. Otter Brook and Andorra Forest, 15,000 acres (61 km^{2}), collectively the largest conservation area in southwest New Hampshire, are cooperatively managed by The Nature Conservancy and the Society for the Protection of New Hampshire Forests and include extensive tracts of northern hardwood forest, wetlands, and rare plant communities. Pitcher Mountain, 2,153 feet (656 m), Hubbard Hill, 1,846 feet (563 m), and Jackson Hill, 2,061 feet (628 m), offer wide views from upland heath barrens and blueberry fields.

Lovewell Mountain, 2,473 feet (754 m), is a rugged monadnock contiguous with the southern part of Sunapee Ridge; several scenic outlooks on ledges provide views of the surrounding countryside. Mount Sunapee, 2,743 feet (836 m), is the high point of a mountainous 10-mile (16 km) ridgeline that spans four towns. The ridge offers scenic vistas from more than a dozen distinct peaks along its length and from the Mount Sunapee ski area on the summit. Other notable peaks along its length include White Ledges, 2,700 feet (820 m), which overlooks Lake Solitude; Lucia's Lookout, 2,500 feet (760 m); an unnamed southern summit, 2,230 feet (680 m); and Kittredge Hill, 2,140 feet (650 m). The commons of Washington and Nelson are small and bucolic classic New England town centers with little commercial development and with architecture dating back to the early 19th century. Washington, 1,507 feet (459 m), is the highest incorporated town in New Hampshire; it is 1-foot (0.30 m) higher than the next-highest town, the ski resort community of Waterville Valley

Notable bodies of water along the trail route include Seavers Reservoir, Howe Reservoir, Chesham Pond, Silver Lake, Childs Bog, Center Pond, Halfmoon Pond, and the mountaintop Lake Solitude.

The MSG is primarily used for hiking, backpacking, and in the winter, snowshoeing. Portions of the trail are suitable for, and are used for, backcountry skiing. Site-specific activities enjoyed along the route include hunting, fishing, boating, and swimming.

=== Intersecting trails ===
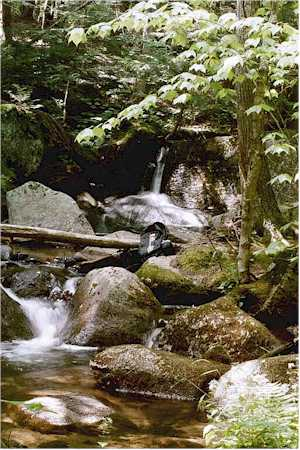
Cascade, Andorra Forest

The Metacomet-Monadnock Trail in southern New Hampshire and central Massachusetts continues south where the MSGT leaves off. This extends the overall hiking possibilities another 210 miles (340 km) via the Metacomet-Monadnock Trail and its logical extensions, the Metacomet and Mattabesett Trails in Connecticut. To the north, the Sunapee-Ragged-Kearsarge Greenway Trail continues from the northern terminus of the MSG via a 75-mile (121 km) loop trail to Mount Kearsarge, Ragged Mountain, Bog Mountain and back to Mount Sunapee.

== History ==
The MSG was first suggested by Allen Chamberlain, formerly president of the Appalachian Mountain Club, in 1919 and was laid out in 1921 by the Society for the Protection of New Hampshire Forests (SPNHF). But the hurricane of 1938 and World War II "effectively ended the original trail; it was not maintained again." The trail was re-established after a study by the SPNHF in 1974.

== Hiking the trail ==
The MSG is blazed with white rectangles. It is regularly maintained, and is considered moderately difficult hiking. Mount Monadnock is regarded as a challenging hike for novice hikers during favorable weather conditions. As the crow flies, the MSGT route is never more than a mile or two from a public road, however, cliffs and steep terrain make access much more difficult in some areas. Trail descriptions are available from a number of commercial and non-commercial sources, and a complete guidebook with topographic maps is published by the Monadnock-Sunapee Greenway Trail Club.

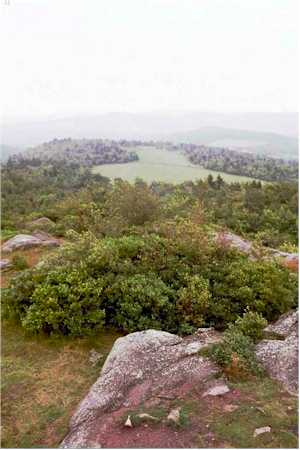
View from Pitcher Mountain

Weather along the MSG is typical of southern New Hampshire. Conditions on exposed hill tops and summits may be harsher during cold or stormy weather. Weather atop the exposed and isolated 3,100-foot (940 m) summit of Mount Monadnock can be much more severe than conditions below; high winds are common year round and winter storms on the summit can be life-threatening. Lightning is a hazard on exposed peaks and ledges during thunderstorms. Snow is common in the winter and may require cross-country skis or snowshoes. Ice can form on exposed ledges and summits, making hiking dangerous without special equipment. Snow and ice tend to linger on Mount Monadnock well into the spring.

Biting insects can be bothersome during warm weather. Parasitic deer ticks (which are known to carry Lyme disease) are a potential hazard. The trail passes through black bear habitat, although problems with bears are rare. More likely are problem encounters with domestic dogs. Skunks, raccoons, and porcupines are common and active after dark. Venomous snakes are considered extinct along the route. Poison ivy is uncommon on the MSGT and it does not thrive on Mount Monadnock at all. Some water sources along the trail flow through inhabited areas or swamps and may be contaminated.

=== Camping ===
Vehicle-accessible campgrounds with basic amenities are located off the MSG via side trails at Monadnock State Park on the south side of Mount Monadnock, and at Mount Sunapee State Park and Pillsbury State Park on the west side of Sunapee Ridge. The MSGTC maintains several backcountry campsites and four lean-tos available to backpackers. Campfires are generally prohibited on the MSG, except in established fire rings in state park campgrounds.

== See also ==
- Metacomet-Monadnock Trail
