= Kearsarge Mountain State Forest =

State forest in Merrimack County, New Hampshire

- Mount Kearsarge State Forest
- IUCN category V (protected landscape/seascape)
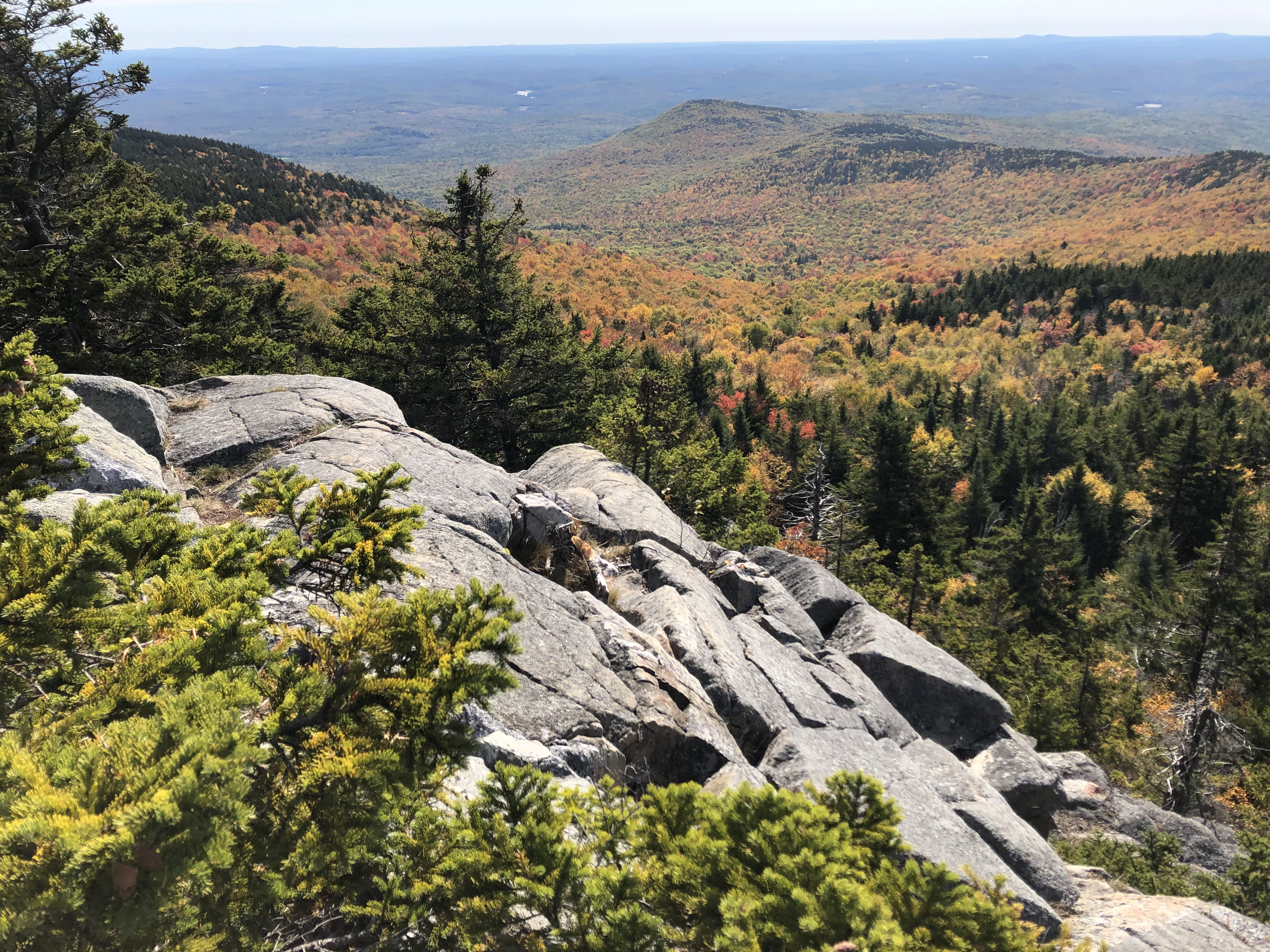
- The southern slopes of Mount Kearsarge, including Mission Ridge

- Location within New Hampshire Location within the United States
- Location: Merrimack County, New Hampshire
- Coordinates: 43°22′59″N 71°51′25″W
- Area: 3,893 acres (15.75 km^{2})
- Established: 1922
- Governing body: New Hampshire Department of Natural and Cultural Resources

Kearsarge Mountain State Forest is a 3,893-acre (1,575 ha) state forest in the towns of Warner, Wilmot, Andover, and Salisbury, New Hampshire, United States. In 1922 it encompassed 839 acres (340 ha). The state forest covers the summit and most of the slopes of Mount Kearsarge, the highest point in Merrimack County. Winslow State Park is in the northern part of the state forest, and Rollins State Park is at the southern edge.

== See also ==
- List of New Hampshire state forests
