= Mount Sunapee State Park =

State park in Merrimack County, New Hampshire

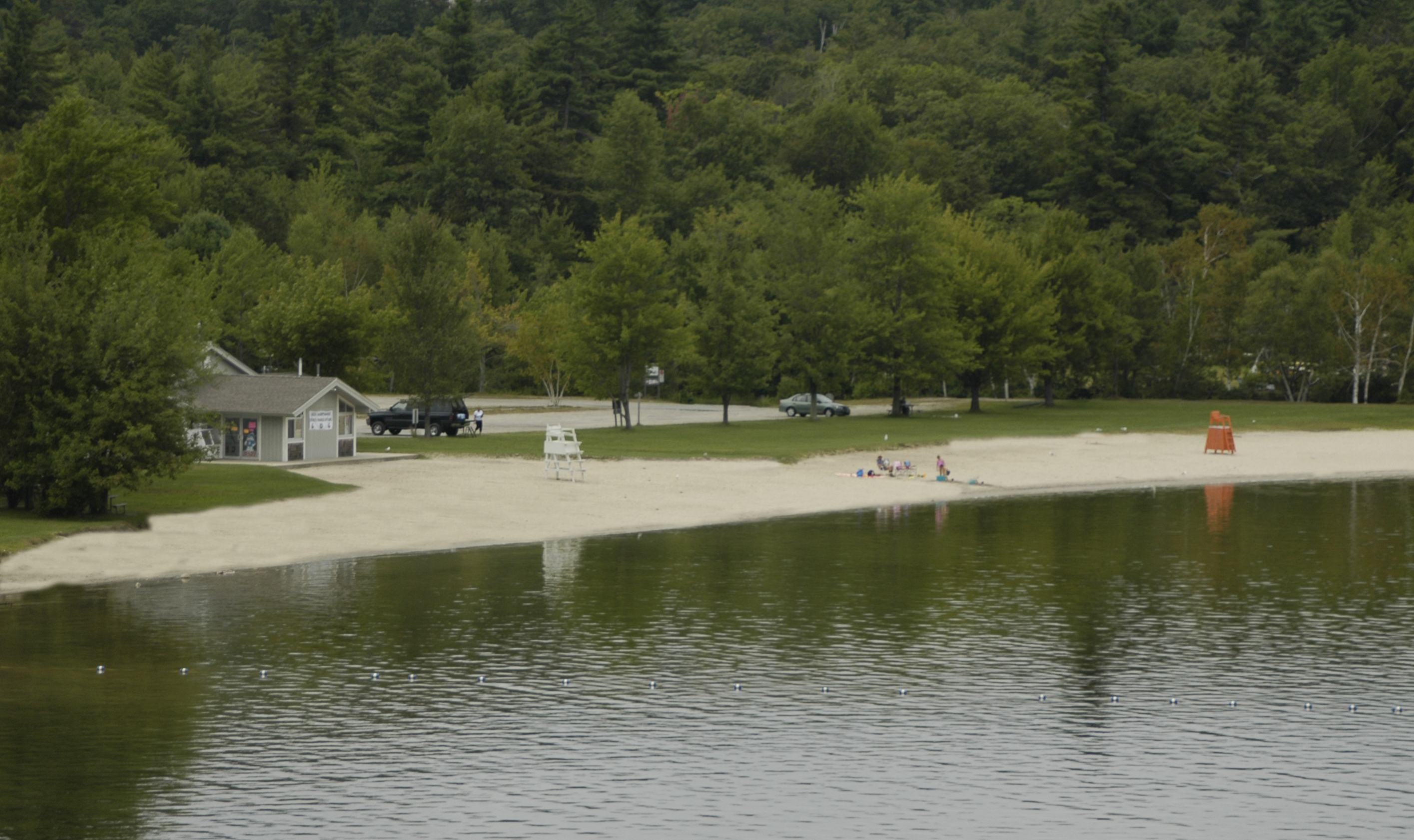
- The beach on Lake Sunapee

- Location within New Hampshire
- Interactive map of Mount Sunapee State Park
- Location: Newbury, New Hampshire, United States
- Coordinates: 43°19′16″N 72°03′44″W
- Area: 2,893 acres (1,171 ha)
- Elevation: 1,923 feet (586 m)
- Established: 1948
- Administrator: New Hampshire Division of Parks and Recreation
- Website: Official website
- New Hampshire State Parks

Mount Sunapee State Park is a public recreation area in Newbury, New Hampshire. The state park's nearly 3,000 acres (1,200 ha) include most of Mount Sunapee and a beach area on Lake Sunapee. Park activities include swimming, hiking, camping, skiing, fishing, picnicking, and non-motorized boating. The park's ski area is operated as Mount Sunapee Resort under the management of Vail Resorts Inc.

The park's beach, also known as Newbury Beach, features a bathhouse, store, canoe and kayak rentals, playground, and restricted boat launch. A seasonal campground is located off NH Route 103, up a winding mountain road accessed through Mount Sunapee Resort.

== Greenways ==
- The 50-mile (80 km) Monadnock-Sunapee Greenway links the park to Pillsbury State Park and southern New Hampshire.
- The Sunapee-Ragged-Kearsarge Greenway, a 75-mile (121 km) loop trail (the "emerald necklace") links the park to Wadleigh State Park, Winslow State Park, and Rollins State Park as well as Gile, Kearsarge and Shadow Hill state forests and the Bog Mountain Wildlife Management Area.

== Trails ==
The state park's extensive trail system is used in all seasons for hiking and in winter for snowshoeing.

From the ski area parking, the Summit Trail travels 2 miles (3 km) along the western slope to the summit, where it meets the Solitude Trail for a 1 mile (1.6 km) walk to Lake Solitude and White Ledges. The Solitude Trail then links to several trails, notably the popular Andrew Brook Trail and the steeper Newbury Trail, both heading eastward, and to the M-S Greenway as it heads south along Sunapee Mountain toward Pillsbury State Park.
