= Hopkins Pond =

Hopkins Pond may refer to:

- Hopkins Pond (New Hampshire), a waterbody on the south slope of Ragged Mountain
- Hopkins Pond (park), a park in Camden Country, New Jersey
  - Hopkins Pond (New Jersey), a waterbody in the above park
