= Lake Solitude =

Lake Solitude is the name of at least twelve bodies of water in the United States including:

- Lake Solitude (New Hampshire), a highland tarn on Mount Sunapee
- Lake Solitude (Wyoming), located within Grand Teton National Park
