= Francis Reed =

Francis Reed may refer to:

- Francis Reed (cricketer) (1850–1912), English cricketer
- Francis Reed (inventor) (1852–1917), American inventor
- Francis Reid (1900–1970), British Army officer
