= Ragged Mountain (New Hampshire) =

Mountain in the American state of New Hampshire

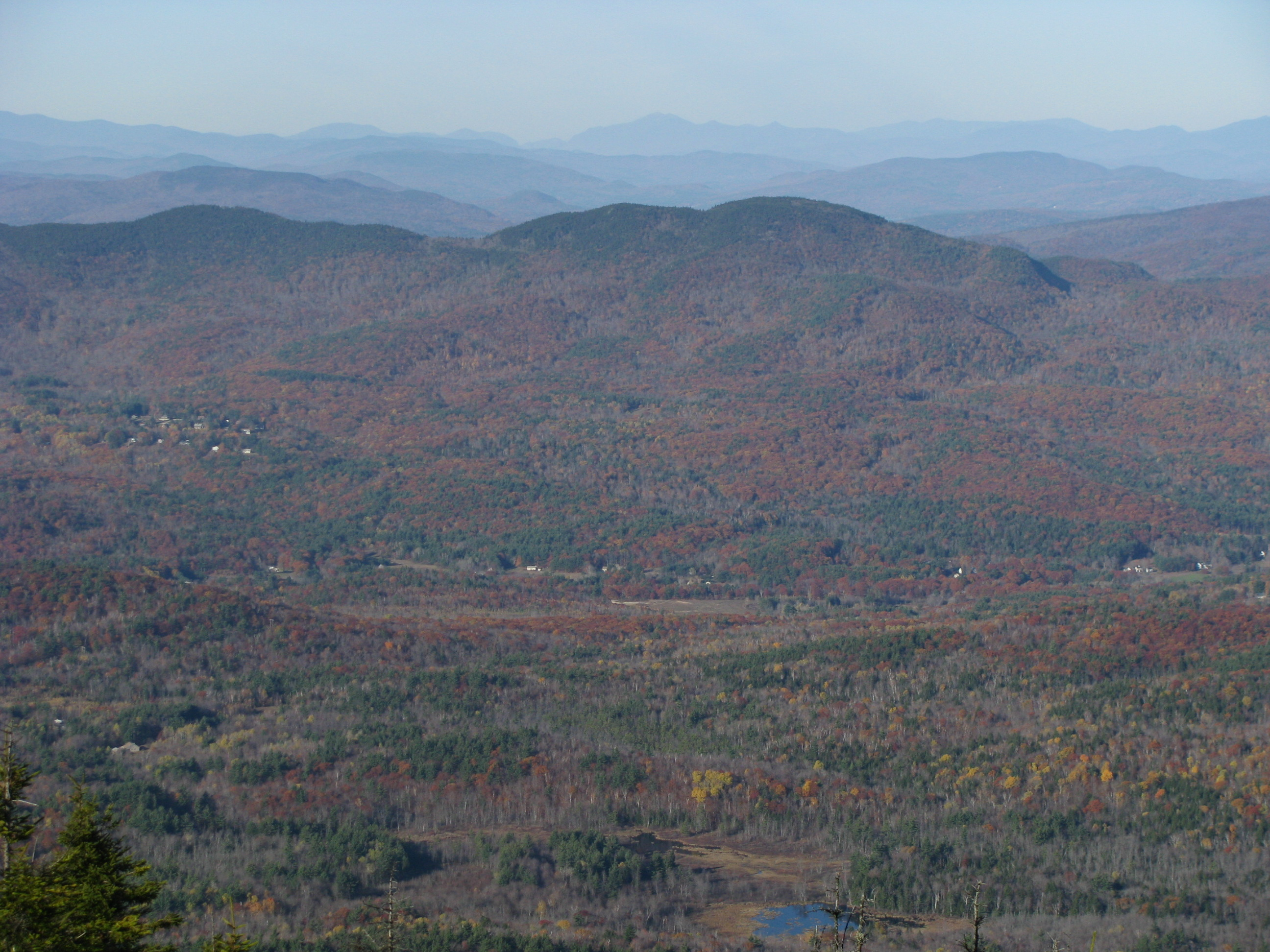
- Ragged Mountain as seen from Mount Kearsarge

Highest point
- Elevation: 2,286 ft (697 m)
- Coordinates: East summit (The Pinnacle): 43°28′5″N 71°49′46″W; West summit (ski resort): 43°28′20″N 71°50′44″W

Geography
- Location: Andover, New Hampshire, U.S.
- Topo map: USGS Andover

Ragged Mountain (2,286 feet (697 m) above sea level) is a low mountain with numerous knobby summits in the towns of Danbury and Andover in central New Hampshire. It is home to the Ragged Mountain ski resort.

== Geography ==
In his book, The History of the Town of Andover, John R. Eastman describes Ragged Mountain as a "truly ragged pile of ledge and boulder, crag and cliff, hill and ravine." An east–west running, detached mountain, Ragged Mountain contains two prominent peaks separated by a shallow notch. The tallest peak, The Pinnacle, lies in the town of Andover at 2,286 feet (697 m); the second peak, at the top of Ragged Mountain Ski Resort, is 2,225 feet (678 m) and sits in the town of Danbury.

The Bulkhead, a 300-foot (91 m) granite cliff, juts out on the east end of Ragged Mountain. A seldom-used rock climbing destination, The Bulkhead is also the last place peregrine falcons have nested in the Sunapee-Kearsarge region of New Hampshire. The Bulkhead can be reached from The Bulkhead Trail at the headwaters of Mitchell Brook on Proctor Academy's campus. From the Andover town green, the hike takes roughly an hour and twenty minutes.

The 75-mile (120 km) long Sunapee–Ragged–Kearsarge (SRK) Greenway, a hiking trail, traverses the summit and subsidiary knobs of the mountain. The trailheads are at Proctor Academy on NH Route 11 in Andover and, on the northern side, on New Canada Road in Danbury.

== Hydrology ==
The northern side of Ragged Mountain drains into the Smith River via Bog Brook. The western, southern, and eastern sides of the mountain drain into the Blackwater River. The entire mountain is situated within the Merrimack River watershed, which empties into the Gulf of Maine (Atlantic Ocean) near Newburyport, Massachusetts.

Water bodies around the base of the mountain are (listed counter-clockwise, starting to the west) Eagle Pond, Cold Pond, Hopkins Pond, Elbow Pond, and Bog Pond.

== Gallery ==
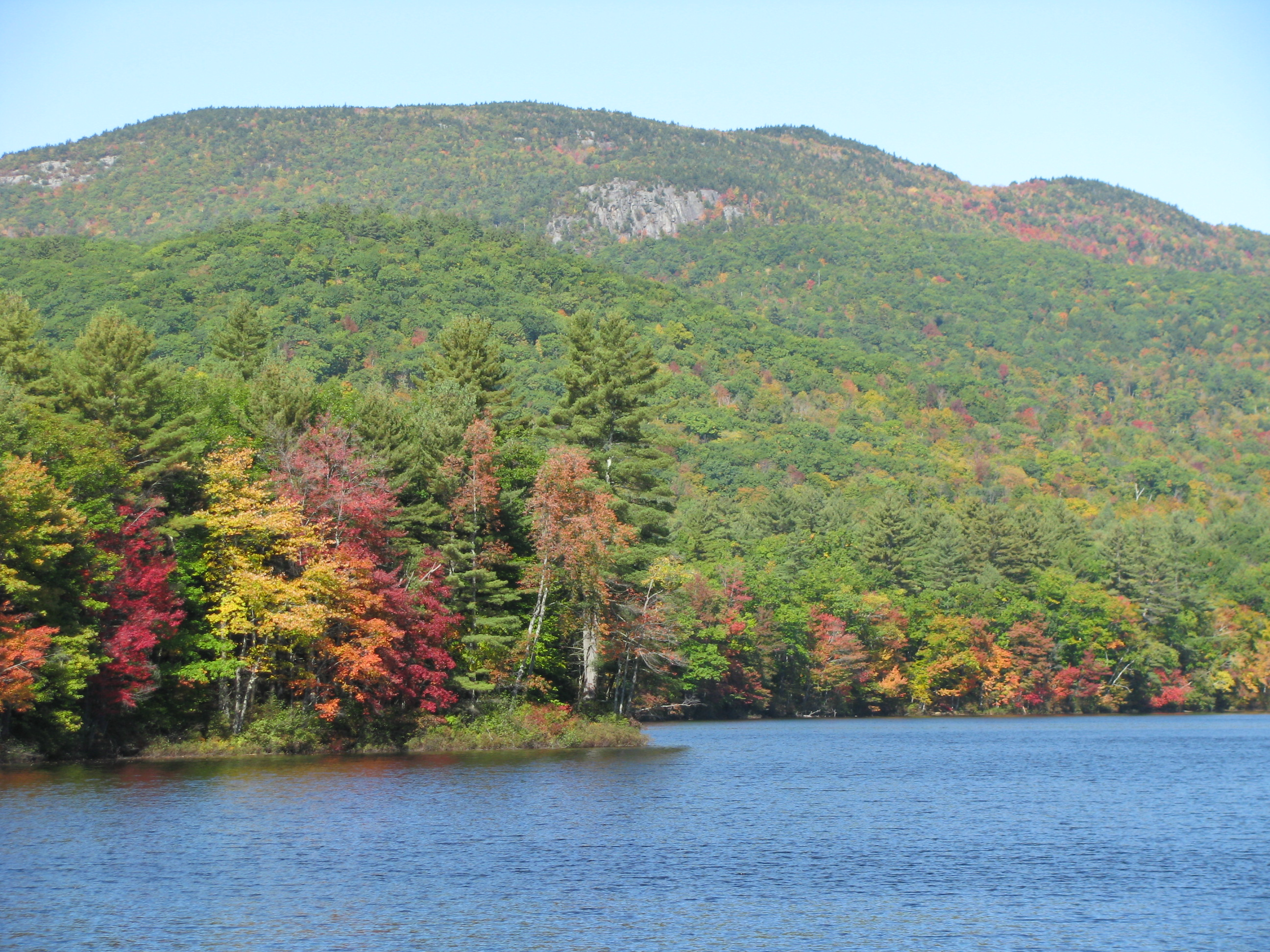
View of Ragged Mountain from Elbow Pond

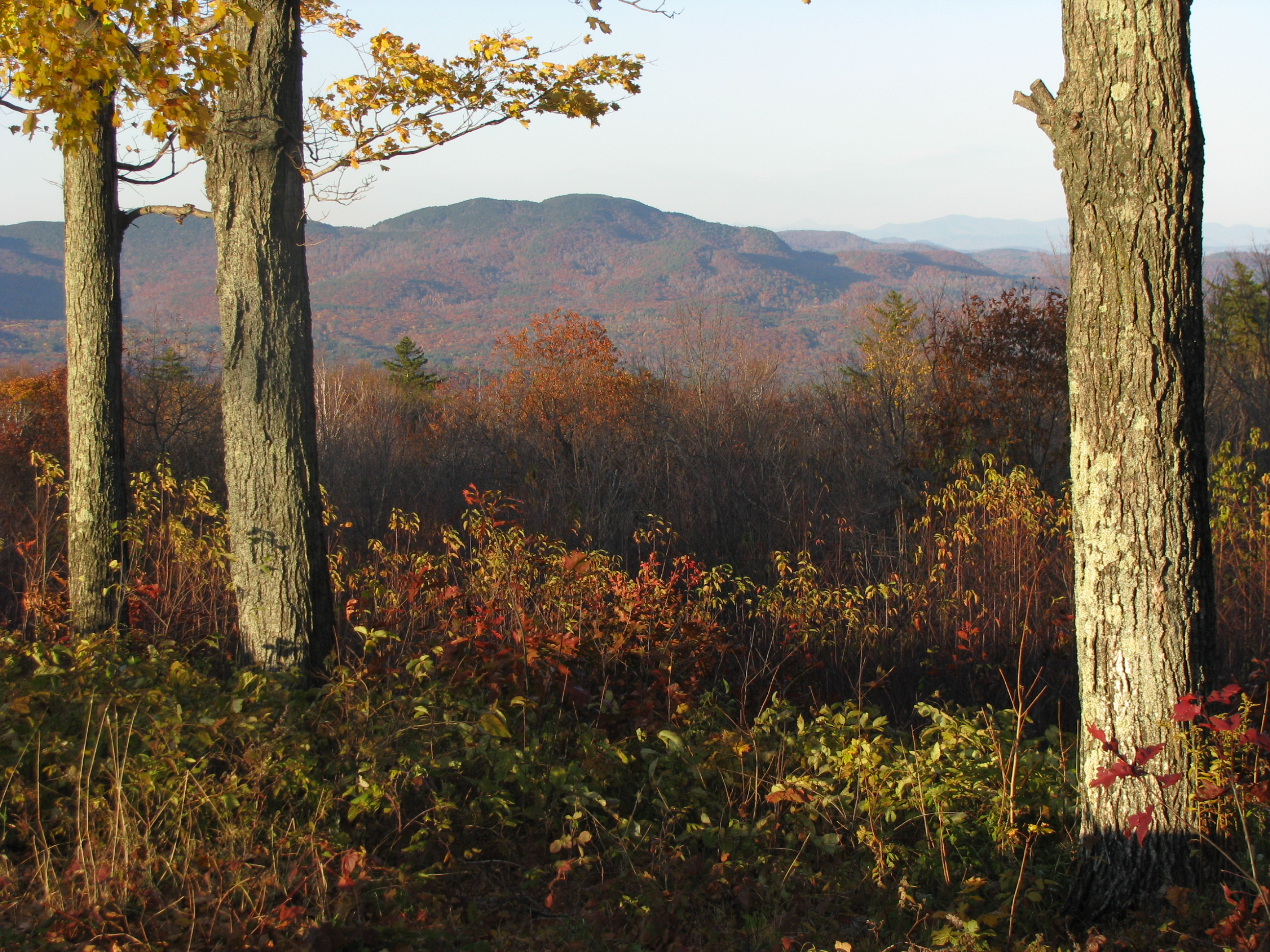
South side of Ragged Mountain from Winslow State Park

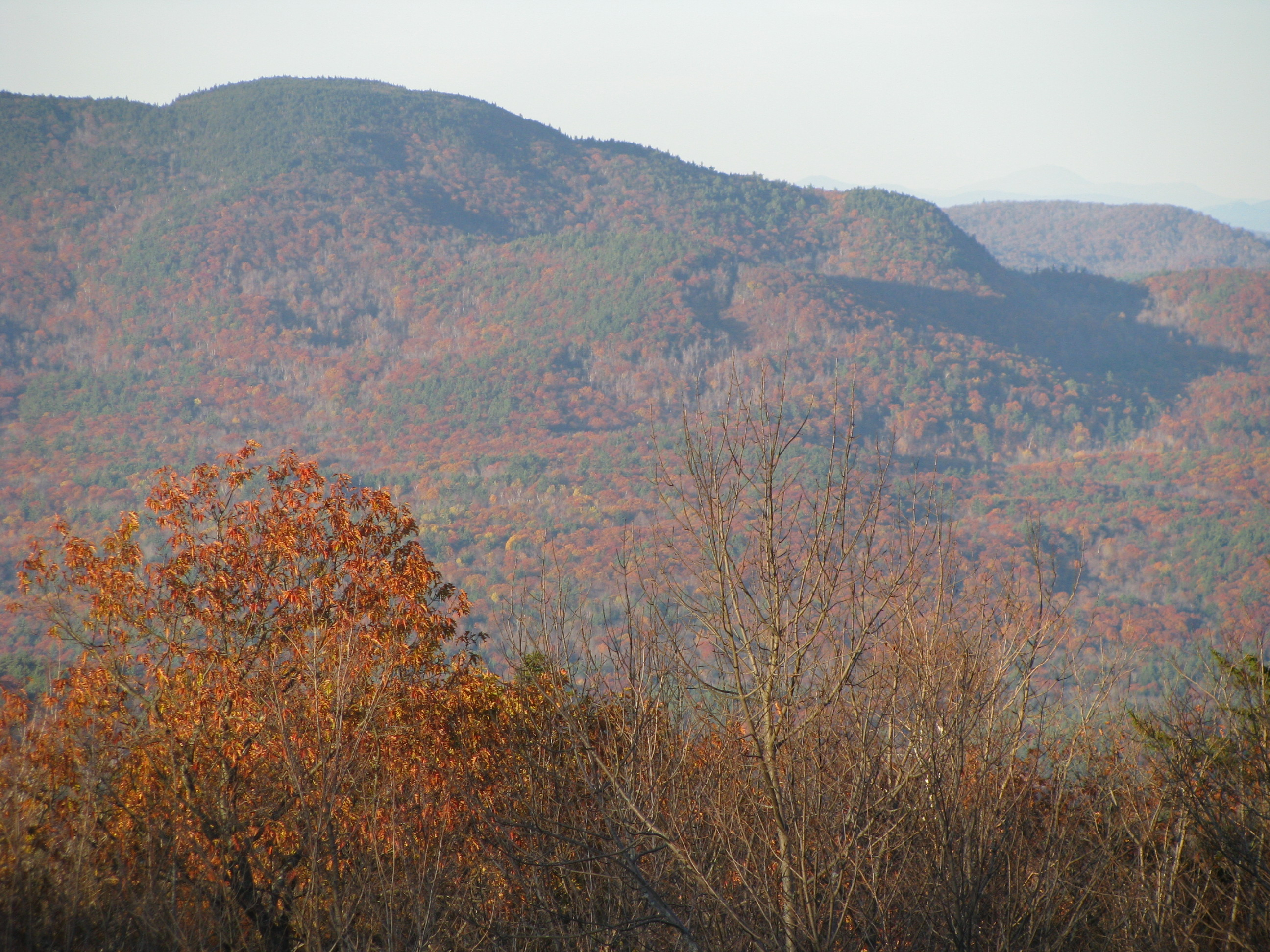
The Pinnacle (2,286 ft) and The Bulkhead (1600 ft)

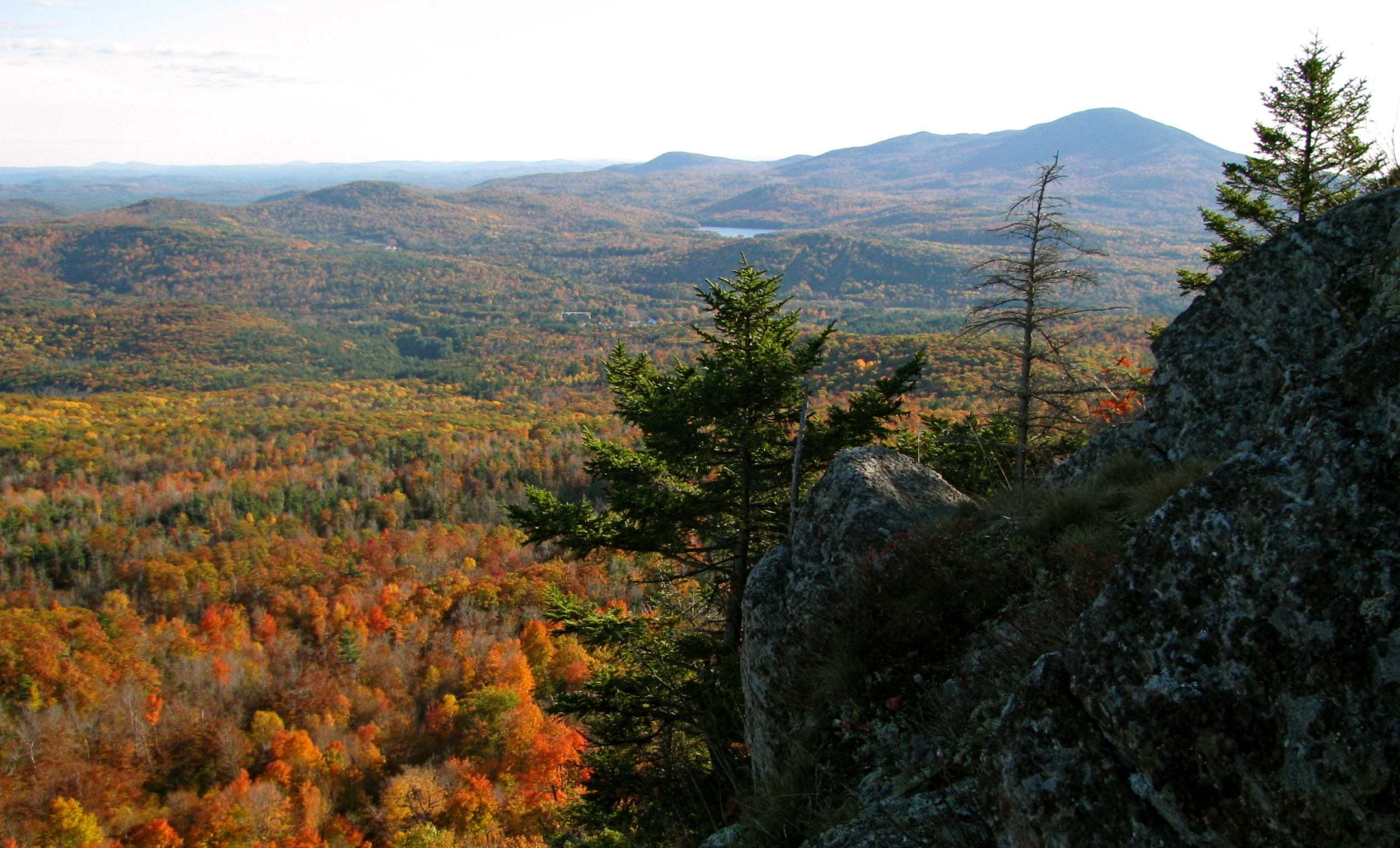
View of Mount Kearsarge from The Bulkhead on Ragged Mountain

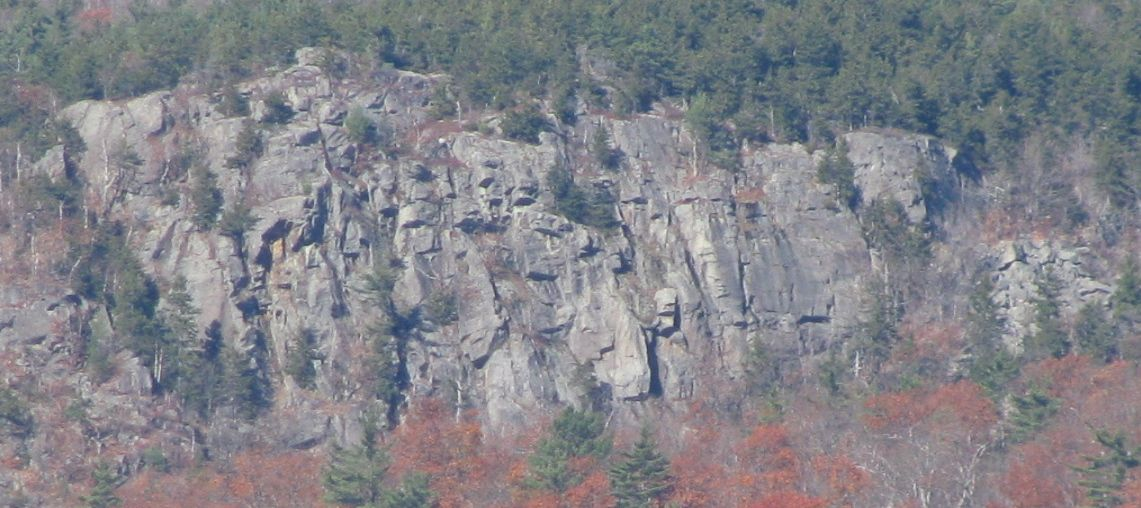
The Bulkhead cliffs on Ragged Mountain
