= USS Kearsarge =

Five ships of the United States Navy have been named USS Kearsarge. The first was named for Mount Kearsarge, and the later ones were named in honor of the first.

- USS Kearsarge (1861) was a sloop of war launched 11 September 1861, fought in the American Civil War, defeated the Confederate commerce raider CSS Alabama, and was wrecked off Central America 2 February 1894.
- USS Kearsarge (BB-5) was a Kearsarge-class battleship launched 24 March 1898, sailed with the Great White Fleet, participated in World War I, was converted to a heavy-crane ship in 1920 and renamed Crane Ship No. 1 (AB-1), then sold for scrapping 9 August 1955.
- USS Kearsarge (CV-12) was an Essex-class aircraft carrier renamed Hornet prior to launch, was in commission 1942–1970, and is preserved as a museum ship in Alameda, California.
- USS Kearsarge (CV-33) was a long-hulled Essex-class aircraft carrier, launched 5 May 1945, served in the Korean War and Vietnam War then scrapped in 1974.
- USS Kearsarge (LHD-3) is a Wasp-class amphibious assault ship commissioned in 1993 and remains in active service.
