= Ragged Mountain Resort =

Ski area in New Hampshire, United States

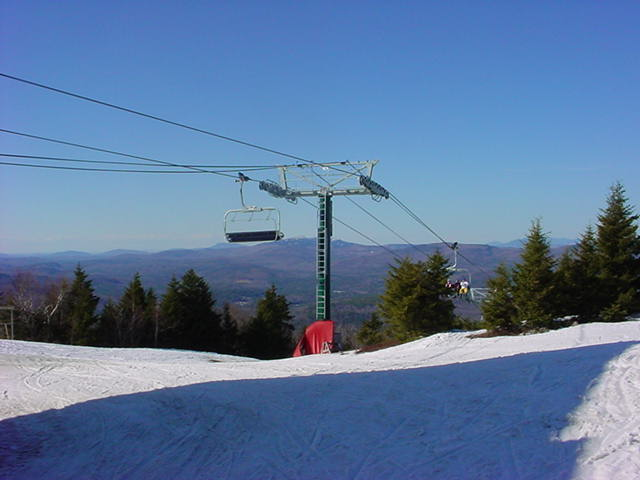
- The Summit Six Pack Chairlift
- Interactive map of Ragged Mountain Resort
- Location: Danbury, New Hampshire, U.S.
- Nearest city: Franklin, New Hampshire, U.S.
- Coordinates: 43°29′04″N 71°50′32″W
- Vertical: 1,250 feet (380 m)
- Trails: 57
- Lift system: 1 Six Pack, 1 HSQ, 1 Triple, 1 Double, 2 Surface Lifts
- Snowmaking: 85%
- Website: raggedmountainresort.com

Ragged Mountain is a ski resort located on the northern side of Ragged Mountain in Danbury, New Hampshire, in the United States, with a vertical drop of 1,250 feet (380 m) and spread across 250 acres (100 ha). Offering three terrain parks and many glades, the resort is home to the first six-person chairlift in New Hampshire.

== History ==
Ragged Mountain Ski Area opened in 1965, sporting seven runs, a T-bar, and a Hall double. Amidst little snowfall and the failure to install snowmaking equipment, the resort went bankrupt in 1974. That year, the state bought the area and immediately sold it to a group of people involved in the ski industry. The area closed during the 1983-84 season.

Real estate developers Al and Walter Endriunas bought the area in a few years later, installed snowmaking and added a new beginner slope, along with another T-bar. Ragged opened once more for the 1988-89 season. They installed two more double lifts in the early 1990s and another trail complex, called Spear Mountain.

In 2002, the area purchased the Summit Six-Pack detachable chairlift, an investment that caused the area to go bankrupt once more. The owners sold Ragged Mountain to RMR-Pacific, LLC, an affiliate of Utah resort developer Pacific Group in 2007. The new owners invested over $3 million in renovations including lodge renovations, upgrades to the snowmaking capacity, and several new dining options, including a brick oven pizzeria and tavern located in the west lodge.

Ragged Mountain replaced the Spear Mountain triple with a Doppelmayr high-speed detachable quad in the summer of 2014. In addition, significant upgrades were made to the Elmwood lodge, which included more seating and two new restaurants. Costs for both these projects amounted to over $5 million.

In early 2019, Ragged Mountain Resort created a company-wide sustainability program to help foster business practices which were environmentally sustainable. As a part of this initiative, the resort added a new digital and interactive trail map to their mobile application, launched a resort-wide recycling program, replaced older, less efficient snowmaking equipment with new lower energy alternatives and converted all lighting at the resort to LED.

As of March 2025, the facility was for sale.
