= Allen Chamberlain =

American journalist and conservationist (1867 – 1945)

- Born: 1867
- Died: 1945
- Occupations: Journalist; conservationist; author

Allen Chamberlain (May 2, 1867, in Boston – 1945) was an American journalist, conservationist, and author. For many years, he lived in Winchester, Massachusetts.

In 1897, he co-founded the Massachusetts Forestry Association (MFA), later renamed to the Massachusetts Forestry and Parks Association (MFPA). Starting in 1901, Chamberlain was a leader in the Appalachian Mountain Club (AMC). He held multiple offices in the club, and was president in 1906. In 1916, he was instrumental in forming the New England Trail Conference (NETC), a confederation of several hiking and trail clubs across New England.

== Conservation ==
In 1897, Allen Chamberlain was commuting home from Boston to Winchester with his friend Joseph Nowell, when both men discussed the health of the forest lining the railroad. Together, Chamberlain and Nowell formed the Massachusetts Forestry Association (MFA), the purpose of which was "to introduce judicious methods in dealing with forest and woodlands; to arouse and educate a public interest in this subject; to promote the afforestation of unproductive lands; to encourage the planting and care of shade trees."

Chamberlain served as the executive secretary of the MFA from its inception until 1911. During that period, the MFA embarked on several initiatives to protect local forests. Much of the work involved lobbying Massachusetts state government. For example, MFA lobbying is credited with convincing legislators to pass a law, "establishing the office of the state forester and a state forest nursery."

Chamberlain gradually broadened his impact from the state level to the regional and then national level. Starting in 1901, he was a leader in the Appalachian Mountain Club (AMC). Although the AMC was not exclusively concerned with conservation, it had influence across New England and beyond. As head of the AMC Exploration and Forestry committee, Chamberlain struck a balance between conservation and legitimate timber harvesting. In 1902, he vowed to oppose, "the ruthless waste of material, and ... the stripping of the timber from those lands which are of little value for anything but forest growth".

Chamberlain held multiple offices in the AMC. In 1901, he was elected head of the Exploration and Forestry committee. In 1904, he served as vice president of the club. In 1906, he was elected club president, an office he occupied for just one year. In 1907, he was again elected head of the Exploration and Forestry committee.

During his tenure at the AMC, Chamberlain was responsible for promoting responsible forest management, maintaining and expanding the club reservations, and lobbying for government protection of New England forests. Perhaps the high point came in 1911, when Congress passed the Weeks Act enabling the subsequent formation of the White Mountain National Forest in 1918. Chamberlain is widely cited as one of the most vocal advocates for the Weeks Act.

== Hiking trails ==
In 1916, Chamberlain was a leading organizer of the New England Trail Conference (NETC), a confederation of hiking clubs across New England. The stated purpose of the NETC was to, "promote cooperation in the creation and maintenance of a system of connecting trails in New England," but for Chamberlain the NETC was a means to an end. His goal was to form, "a political base for support of wise, long-range forestry practices."

The NETC was most active from 1917 through the 1920s. During this period, several long-distance hiking trails were proposed and at least partially blazed. Most famously, Benton MacKaye proposed the Appalachian Trail in 1921. Chamberlain himself had a role in creating two smaller trails: the Wapack Trail and the Monadnock-Sunapee Greenway.

Chamberlain was also a promoter of hiking trails across New England. He wrote two books to guide fellow hikers, or as he called them, "trampers". In Vacation Tramps in New England Highlands (1919), he described several long-distance hiking trails crossing the higher peaks of New Hampshire, Vermont and Maine. In The Annals of the Grand Monadnock (1936), Chamberlain delved deeply into the history of trail building on Mount Monadnock.

== Books ==
- Vacation Tramps in New England Highlands (1919)
- Beacon Hill: Its Ancient Pastures and Early Mansions (1925)
- The Annals of the Grand Monadnock (1936)
- Pigeon Cove: Its Early Settlers and Their Farms (1940)

== Legacy ==
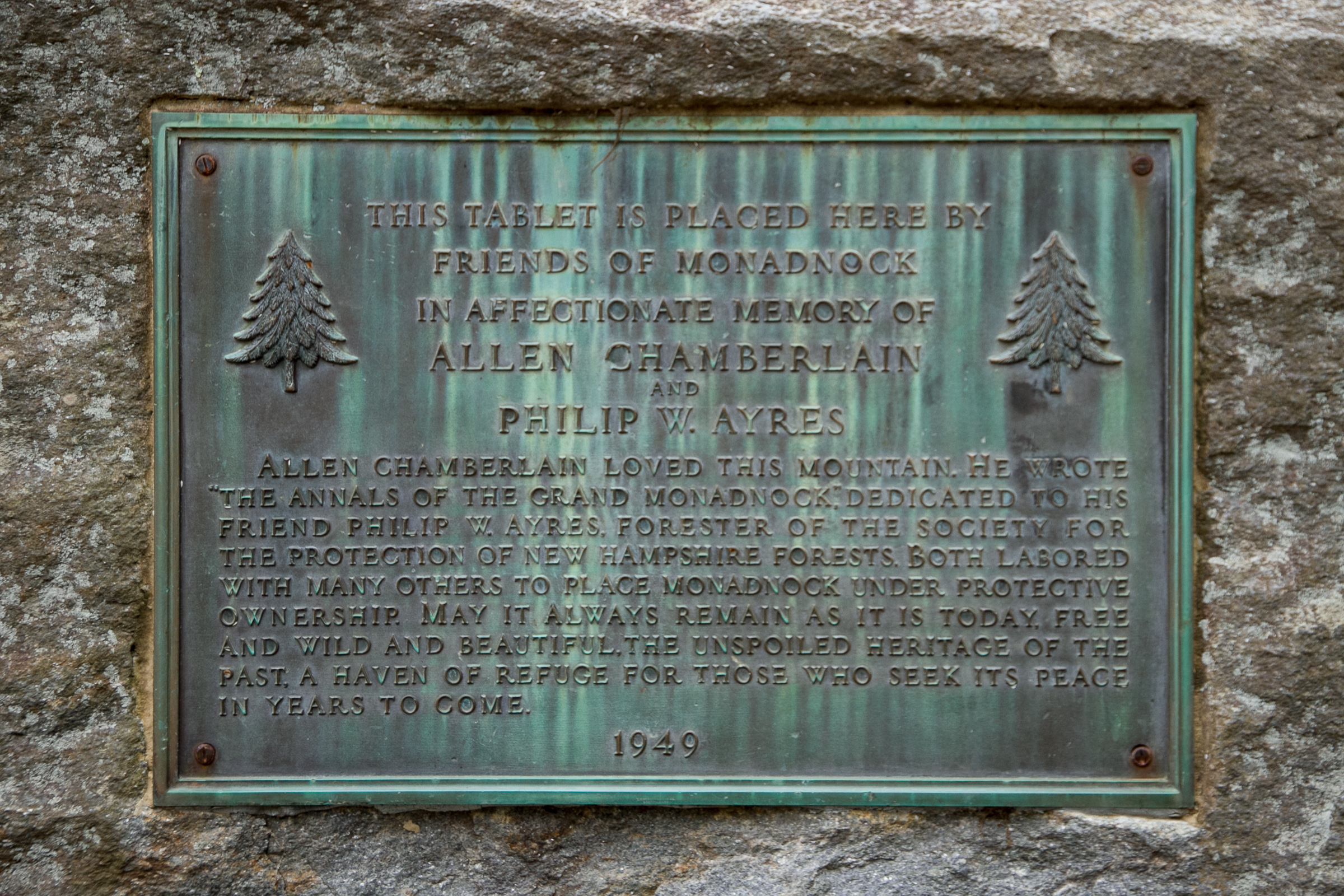
Plaque commemorating Chamberlain and Philip W. Ayres

The Chamberlain-Reynolds Memorial Forest, in Center Harbor, New Hampshire, is named for Chamberlain and his colleague Harris Reynolds.

In 1949, the Friends of Monadnock dedicated a memorial to Chamberlain and his colleague Philip W. Ayres. The memorial is located at the start of the White Dot trail on Mount Monadnock. A plaque on the memorial remembers both men for laboring, "with many others to place Monadnock under protective ownership".
