= Danbury, New Hampshire =

Town in New Hampshire, United States

- Town
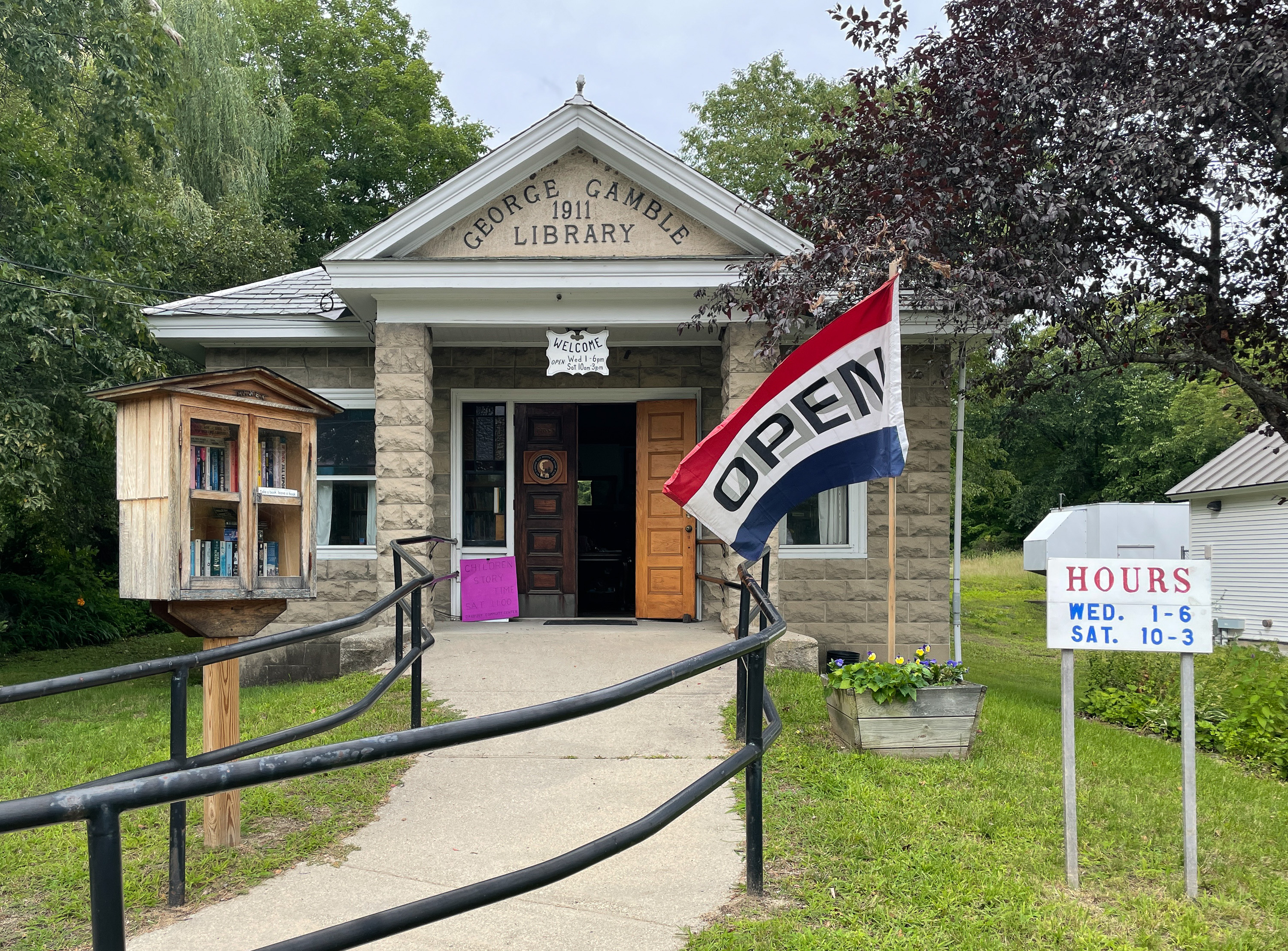
- George Gamble Library

- Location in Merrimack County and the state of New Hampshire
- Coordinates: 43°31′39″N 71°51′59″W
- Country: United States
- State: New Hampshire
- County: Merrimack
- Incorporated: 1795
- Villages: Danbury; Elmwood; South Danbury

Area
  - Total: 38.0 sq mi (98.5 km^{2})
  - Land: 37.7 sq mi (97.7 km^{2})
  - Water: 0.31 sq mi (0.8 km^{2}) 0.81%
- Elevation: 810 ft (250 m)

Population (2020)
  - Total: 1,250
  - Density: 33/sq mi (12.8/km^{2})
- Time zone: UTC-5 (Eastern)
  - Summer (DST): UTC-4 (Eastern)
- ZIP code: 03230
- Area code: 603
- FIPS code: 33-16980
- GNIS feature ID: 873574
- Website: www.townofdanburynh.com

Danbury is a town in Merrimack County, New Hampshire, United States. The population was 1,250 at the 2020 census.

== History ==
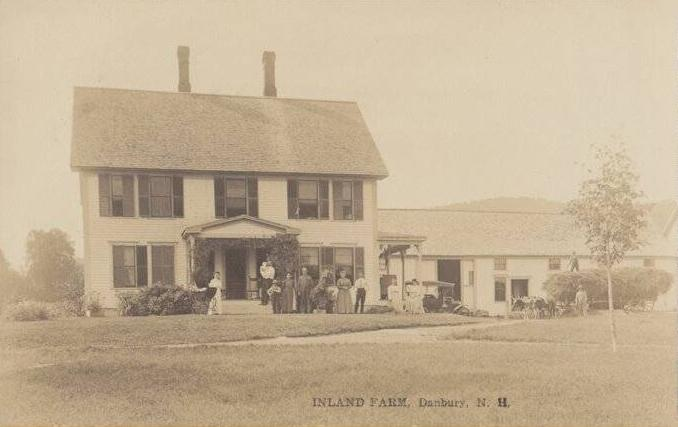
Inland Farm in 1916

Danbury was first settled c. 1771 as a part of Alexandria, but mountainous terrain separated it from the rest of the town. In 1795, it was set off and incorporated, the name suggested by a settler from Danbury, Connecticut. The town later grew by adding land from Wilmot and Hill. Farmers found the surface mostly hilly, but with some good intervales suitable for agriculture. Raising cattle and sheep became the principal occupation. By 1859, when the population was 934, it had seven sawmills, two shingle, lath and clapboard mills, and one tannery.

== Geography ==
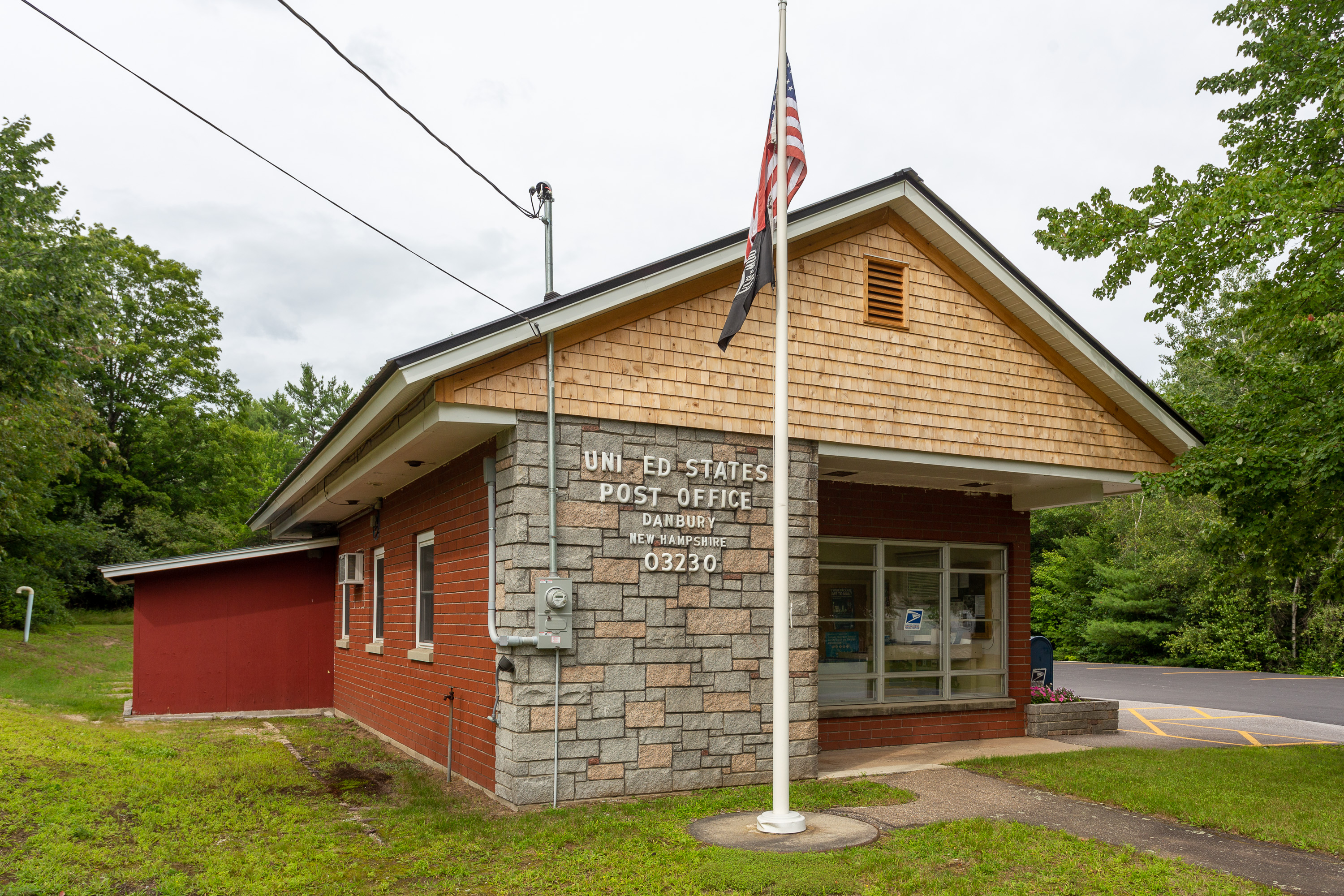
Danbury post office

According to the United States Census Bureau, the town has a total area of 38.0 square miles (98.5 km^{2}), of which 37.7 square miles (97.7 km^{2}) are land and 0.3 square miles (0.8 km^{2}) are water, comprising 0.81% of the town. The Smith River, an east-flowing tributary of the Pemigewasset River, runs through the center of town, while the southwest part of town is drained by Walker Brook and Frazier Brook, south-flowing tributaries of the Blackwater River, which continues on to the Contoocook River. The northeast corner of the town drains east to Newfound Lake, which flows into the Pemigewasset River. The entire town is part of the Merrimack River watershed. Waukeena Lake, School Pond, and Bog Pond are a few of the bodies of water within the town limits.

The highest point in Danbury is the summit of Tinkham Hill, at 2,320 feet (710 m) above sea level, in the northern part of town. Ragged Mountain is a prominent mountain with multiple summits which occupies the southern portion of town and has a ski area of the same name; the elevation of the Danbury summit of Ragged is 2,225 ft (678 m) above sea level. The Sunapee-Ragged-Kearsarge Greenway hiking trail crosses a corner of Danbury along Ragged Mountain's Ridge Trail. Access to the Ridge Trail from the SRK Greenway is on the SRKG 6.1 mile trail section 9, either from trailhead parking on New Canada Road in Wilmot from the northwest or from Proctor Academy's trailhead parking in Andover from the southeast.

Danbury is located approximately 35 miles (56 km) northwest of Concord, the state capital, and 50 miles (80 km) northwest of Manchester, the state's largest city. Danbury is the northernmost town in Merrimack County and lies within the Dartmouth-Lake Sunapee Region. The town is served by U.S. Route 4 and New Hampshire Route 104.

=== Adjacent municipalities ===
- Alexandria (north)
- Hill (east)
- Andover (south)
- Wilmot (southwest)
- Grafton (west)

== Demographics ==
Historical population
Census	Pop.	Note	%±
1790	111		—
1800	165		48.6%
1810	345		109.1%
1820	467		35.4%
1830	786		68.3%
1840	800		1.8%
1850	934		16.8%
1860	947		1.4%
1870	796		−15.9%
1880	760		−4.5%
1890	683		−10.1%
1900	654		−4.2%
1910	592		−9.5%
1920	516		−12.8%
1930	498		−3.5%
1940	578		16.1%
1950	496		−14.2%
1960	435		−12.3%
1970	489		12.4%
1980	680		39.1%
1990	884		30.0%
2000	1,071		21.2%
2010	1,164		8.7%
2020	1,250		7.4%
U.S. Decennial Census

In 1800, there were 165 people living in Danbury, according to the first official census.

As of the 2000 census, there were 1,071 people, 435 households, and 310 families residing in the town. The population density was 28.6 inhabitants per square mile (11.0/km^{2}). There were 596 housing units at an average density of 15.9 per square mile (6.1/km^{2}). The racial makeup of the town was:

- 99.53% White (U.S. average: 75.1%)
- 0.19% African American (U.S. average: 12.3%)
- 0.09% Native American (U.S. average: 0.1%)
- 0.19% from two or more races. (U.S. average: 2.4%)

Hispanic or Latino of any race were 0.47% of the population. (U.S. average: 12.5%)

In 2000, there were 435 households with an average household size of 2.46 and an average family size of 2.84.

- 31.0% had children under the age of 18 living with them. (U.S. average: 32.8%)
- 57.7% were married couples living together. (U.S. average: 51.7%)
- 8.7% had a female householder with no husband present. (U.S. average: 12.2%)
- 28.7% were non-families. (U.S. average: 31.9%)
- 20.9% of all households were made up of individuals. (U.S. average: 25.8%)
- 6.9% had someone living alone who was 65 years of age or older. (U.S. average: 9.2%)

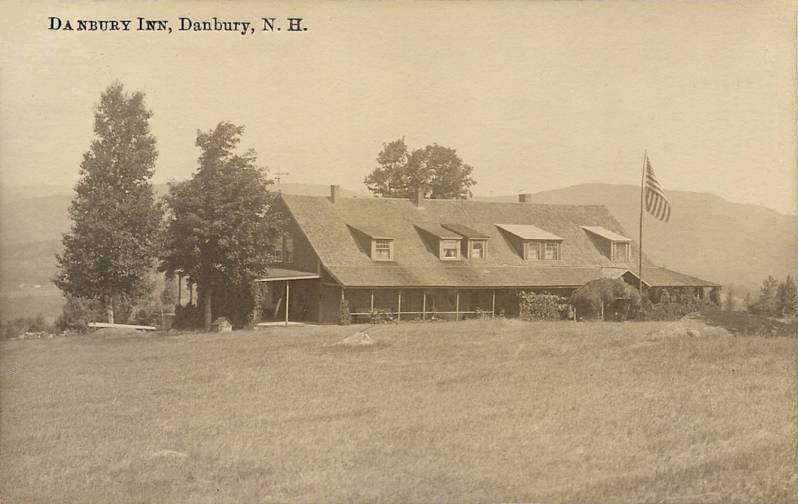
Danbury Inn in 1916

In 2000, the town's population had a median age of 41 years (U.S. average: 35.3).

- 23.0% under the age of 18
- 6.8% from 18 to 24
- 30.7% from 25 to 44
- 26.7% from 45 to 64
- 12.8% who were 65 years of age or older.

For every 100 females, there were 104.0 males. For every 100 females age 18 and over, there were 104.7 males.

The median income for a household in the town was $38,313 (U.S. average: $41,994). The median income for a family was $40,809 (U.S. average: $50,046). Males had a median income of $32,105 versus $26,328 for females. The per capita income for the town was $18,339. About 8.9% of families (U.S. average: 9.2%), and 11.1% of the population (U.S. average: 12.4%) were below the poverty line, including 11.9% of those under age 18 and 9.3% of those age 65 or over.

== Education ==
Danbury is within the Newfound Area School District. Danbury Elementary School is in the community. The district's secondary schools are Newfound Memorial Middle School, and Newfound Regional High School in Bristol.

== Places of interest ==
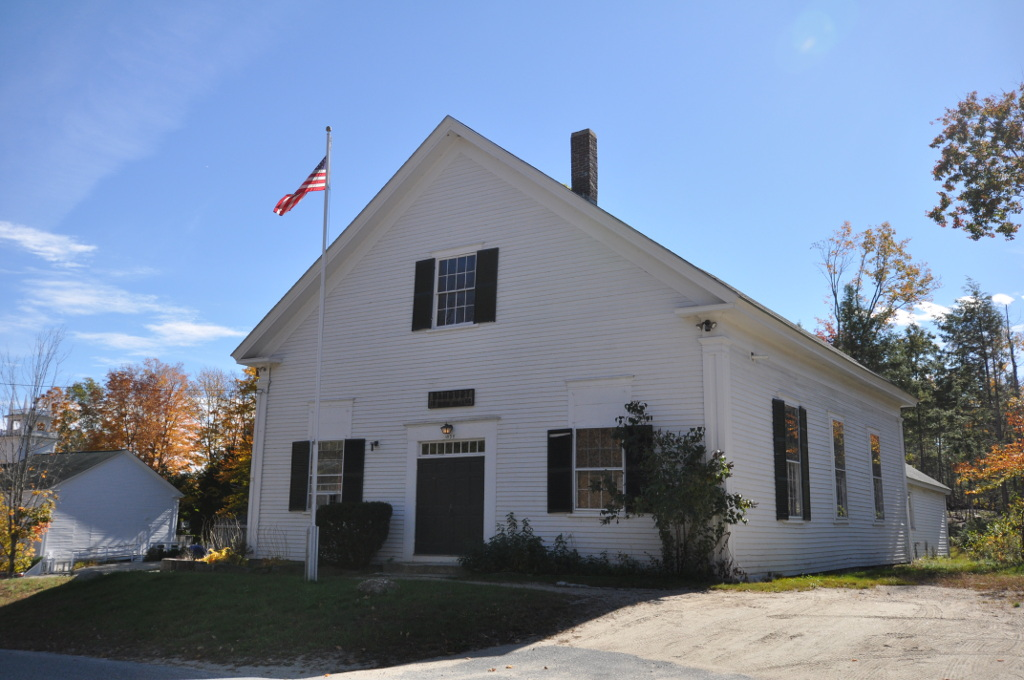
Danbury Town Hall

- Ragged Mountain Resort, ski and golf vacation resort
- Danbury North Road Schoolhouse Museum, run by Danbury Historical Society.
- Bog Pond Dam or Danbury Bog, 100-acre (40 ha) recreational reservoir
- Waukeena Lake, 56-acre (23 ha) cold water lake, motorboats restricted
- School Pond, 37-acre (15 ha) warm water pond, motorboats restricted
- Emily & Theodore Hope Forest 375-acre (152 ha) property preserved by the Society for the Protection of New Hampshire Forests (SPNHF)
- Rosemary's Woods, 215-acre (87 ha) SPNHF property
- Independence Park, municipal multi-purpose field

== Notable people ==
- Francis Reed (1852–1917), inventor of many lathe and drill machines
- Amos Leavitt Taylor, Secretary of Massachusetts Republican Party (1927–1928); Massachusetts Republican State Chair (1924–1949)

== See also ==
- Northern Rail Trail
- Ragged Mountain Resort
