= Frazier Brook =

- Location within New Hampshire Location within the United States

Location
- Country: United States
- State: New Hampshire
- County: Merrimack
- Towns: Danbury, Wilmot, Andover

Physical characteristics
- Source
  - location: Danbury
  - coordinates: 43°31′15″N 71°52′29″W
  - elevation: 940 ft (290 m)
- Mouth: Blackwater River
  - location: Andover (Cilleyville)
  - coordinates: 43°25′52″N 71°52′6″W
  - elevation: 644 ft (196 m)
- Length: 7.7 mi (12.4 km)

Frazier Brook is a 7.7-mile-long (12.4 km) stream in central New Hampshire in the United States. Via the Blackwater and Contoocook rivers, it is part of the Merrimack River watershed. It is subject to the New Hampshire Comprehensive Shoreland Protection Act.

Frazier Brook begins in Danbury, New Hampshire, just south of the town center, and flows south through the town of Wilmot into Andover. Eagle Pond and Bog Pond interrupt the brook's flow. Shortly below Bog Pond, the brook reaches the Blackwater River at the village of Cilleyville.

Frazier Brook is paralleled for most of its length by U.S. Route 4.

== See also ==
- List of rivers of New Hampshire
