= Lake Solitude (New Hampshire) =

Lake in New Hampshire, United States

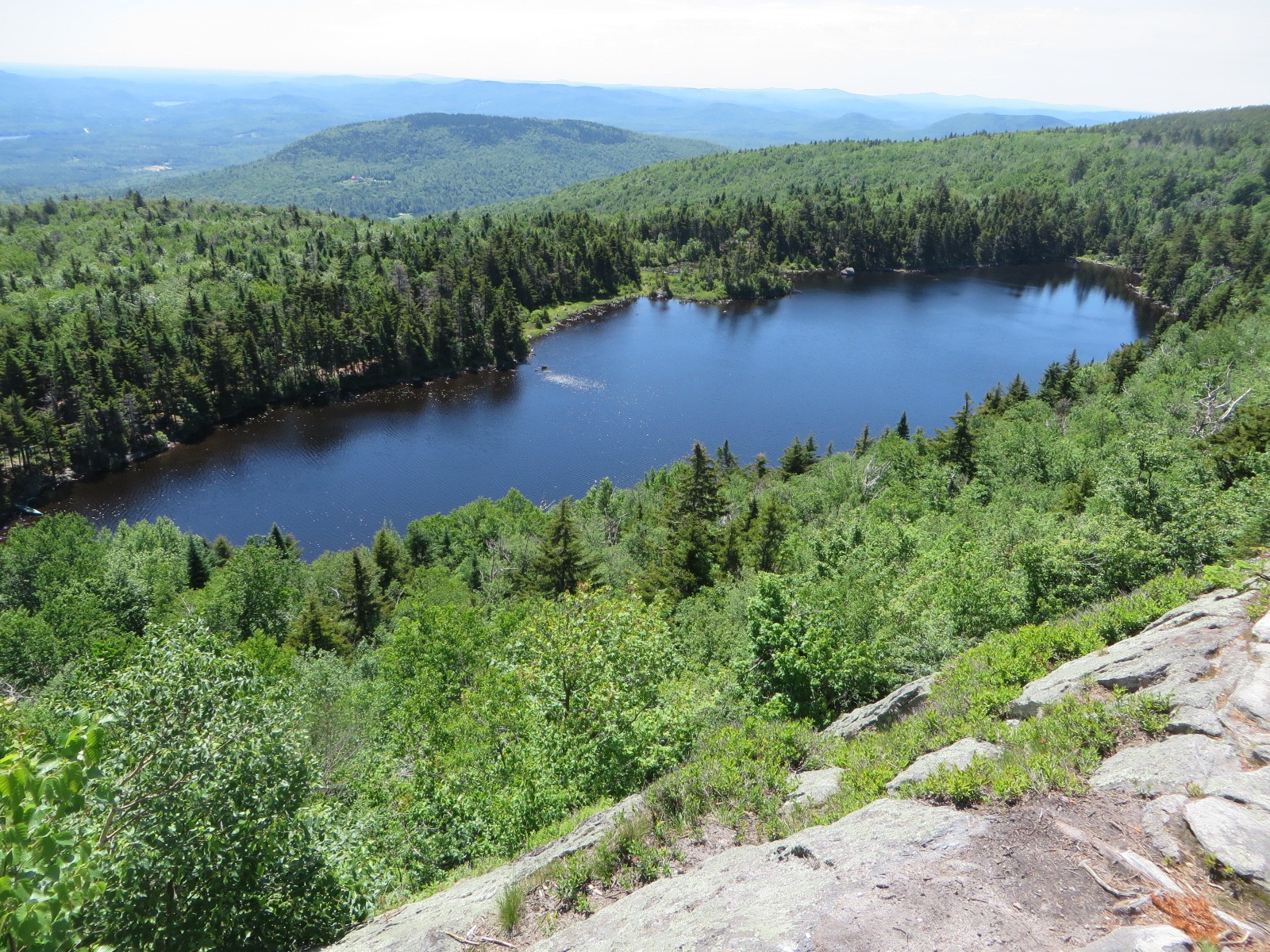
- View from White Ledge

- Location within New Hampshire
- Location: Newbury, Merrimack County, New Hampshire
- Coordinates: 43.3081°N 72.0623°W
- Type: Tarn
- Primary outflows: Andrew Brook
- Basin countries: United States
- Max. length: 0.2 mi (0.32 km)
- Max. width: 0.06 mi (0.097 km)
- Surface area: 6 acres (2.4 ha)
- Average depth: 6 ft (1.8 m)
- Max. depth: 22 ft (6.7 m)
- Surface elevation: 2,510 ft (770 m)

Lake Solitude is a highland tarn located in western New Hampshire, United States, at the top of Sunapee Ridge between the main summit of Mount Sunapee and South Peak. The lake, covering 6 acres (2.4 ha), is approximately 832 feet (254 m) long by 383 feet (117 m) wide and is located within Mount Sunapee State Park in the town of Newbury. A popular hiking destination, Lake Solitude is accessible via the Andrew Brook Trail, the Newbury Trail, or the long-distance Monadnock-Sunapee Greenway Trail. White Ledge, elevation 2,720 feet (830 m), rises steeply above the lake's west shore and provides expansive views. The lake is considered an important habitat for rare species and is off limits to swimmers and dogs.

Lake Solitude drains into Andrew Brook, thence into Todd Lake, the Warner River, the Contoocook River, then into the Merrimack River and the Atlantic Ocean.

The lake is classified as a coldwater fishery, with observed species including brook trout.

== See also ==
- List of lakes in New Hampshire
