= Hopkins Pond (New Hampshire) =

Lake in Merrimack County, New Hampshire, United States

- Adder Pond
- Sunset

- Location within New Hampshire Location within the United States
- Location: Merrimack County, New Hampshire
- Coordinates: 43°26′47″N 71°48′33″W
- Primary outflows: tributary of Mountain Brook
- Basin countries: United States
- Max. length: 0.3 mi (0.5 km)
- Max. width: 0.25 mi (0.4 km)
- Surface area: 27 acres (11 ha)
- Average depth: 6 ft (1.8 m)
- Max. depth: 15 ft (4.6 m)
- Surface elevation: 644 feet (196 m)
- Settlements: Andover

Hopkins Pond (also known as Adder Pond) is a small pond located at the south foot of Ragged Mountain, in the town of Andover, New Hampshire, United States. It lies at an elevation of 644 feet (196 m). The pond is part of Proctor Academy's 2,500-acre (10 km^{2}) campus in Andover and is jointly managed by Proctor and the New Hampshire Fish and Game Department. The pond area is open to the public for non-motorized boat travel, fishing and hiking.

This shallow pond has an average depth of 6 feet (1.8 m), is 15 feet (4.6 m) deep at the deepest point, and covers a total area of 27 acres (11 ha). It empties eastward into Mountain Brook below Elbow Pond. Mountain Brook, in turn, is a tributary of the Blackwater River, which flows via the Contoocook River and Merrimack River to the Gulf of Maine (Atlantic Ocean) at Newburyport, Massachusetts.

Hopkins Pond sits within the Merrimack River watershed, and is floristically considered part of the Sunapee Uplands sub-region of the Lower New England-Northern Piedmont Ecoregion, as defined by The Nature Conservancy, and the New England-Acadian Forest Ecoregion, as defined by the World Wildlife Fund.

The north shore of Hopkins Pond can be accessed from the west by Middle Hopkins Pond Trail. The south shore can be accessed from Lower Hopkins Pond Trail. Both shores can be accessed from the east by an NH Fish and Game access road off Elbow Pond Road.

Observed species of fish in the pond include rainbow trout and brook trout.

== See also ==
- List of lakes in New Hampshire
