= Francis Reed (inventor) =

American inventor

- Born: April 28, 1852; Danbury, New Hampshire
- Died: 1917
- Known for: Improvement of the drill

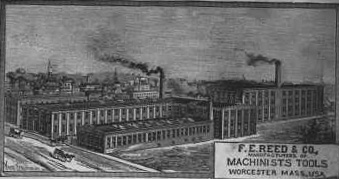
F. E. Reed Factory 1891

Francis Reed (1852–1917) was an American inventor, concentrating mostly on improving the drill, and founder of the F. E. Reed & Co.

== Early years ==
Francis E. Reed was born in Danbury, New Hampshire, on April 28, 1852, to father Ezekiel Sayes Reed. He attended the local schools until his family moved to Concord, New Hampshire, at the age of nine. He attended public schools and the Penacook Academy in Penacook, an area of Concord.

== Career ==
After completing his education, Francis moved to Manchester, New Hampshire, where he got a job as a machinist at the Amoskeag Mills. For 75 cents/day he first worked on the manufacturing of a steam fire engine. In 1880, at the age of 28, Reed married Margaret Elvira Haddock (b. April 6, 1854) of Little Warwick, Quebec, and moved to Worcester, Massachusetts, to work for the Union Water Meter Company, then the Boynton-Plummer Machine Company In 1885 he started his own company with partners Reed & Page electrical contractors.

In 1889, Reed bought a black smith drilling machine company from George Burnham (15 Hermon Street). He kept the name and address until 1902, when he changed it to the Francis Reed Company (43 Hammond Street). It is here that Reed began to experiment with improving the drill. He invented many devices, including a machine that drills multiple holes at once. His two sons, Ralph S. and Merton F., helped run the business as his tools and parts were sold all over the world. Francis Reed was known as a very gifted mechanic, a shrewd businessman, energetic, and industrious.

Beginning in about 1890, business took off and the F.E. Read Co. lathe became the world standard.

"In 1877 the company employed 6 men and produced about 150 machines a year, in 1912 he owned 8 buildings, employed a thousand men and produced two thousand machines a year. Mr. Reed retired in 1912 and the Reed-Prentice Co. was formed which took over management of the Prentice Bros Co., The F. E. Reed Co., the Reed Foundry Co., and The Reed-Curtis Machine Screw Co. This corp had a capitalization of $2,000,000. Mr. Reed remained as director. He died in 1917."

In April 1912, the F.E. Reed Company and the closely interwoven Prentice Brothers Company merged, and became the Reed-Prentice Company, and in 1915 the company was sold to new interests.
