= Wadleigh State Park =

State park in Merrimack County, New Hampshire

- Location within New Hampshire
- Interactive map of Wadleigh State Park
- Location: Sutton, New Hampshire, United States
- Coordinates: 43°21′26″N 71°56′43″W
- Area: 43 acres (17 ha)
- Elevation: 909 feet (277 m)
- Established: 1934
- Administrator: New Hampshire Division of Parks and Recreation
- Website: Official website
- New Hampshire State Parks

Wadleigh State Park is a public recreation area located on the south shore of 170-acre (69 ha) Kezar Lake in Sutton, New Hampshire. The state park has a bathhouse and playing fields and offers opportunities for swimming, picnicking, fishing, and boating. (Note: Power boats are allowed, but the lake is not very large, and power boats could harass the loons that nest on an island.)

== History ==
The park was developed by workers with the State Emergency Work Agency and the Civilian Conservation Corps after the land was given to the state by the Village Improvement Society, which had raised money to make its initial purchase through public subscription. The 1938 Hurricane destroyed much the park including recently constructed buildings and vast amounts of its forest.

== Greenway ==
The park is on the Sunapee-Ragged-Kearsarge Greenway, a 75-mile (121 km) loop trail that also passes Mount Sunapee State Park, Winslow State Park, Rollins State Park, Gile, Kearsarge and Shadow Hill state forests, and the Bog Mountain Wildlife Management Area.
