= Mount Kearsarge (Merrimack County, New Hampshire) =

Mountain in New Hampshire

- Carasarga
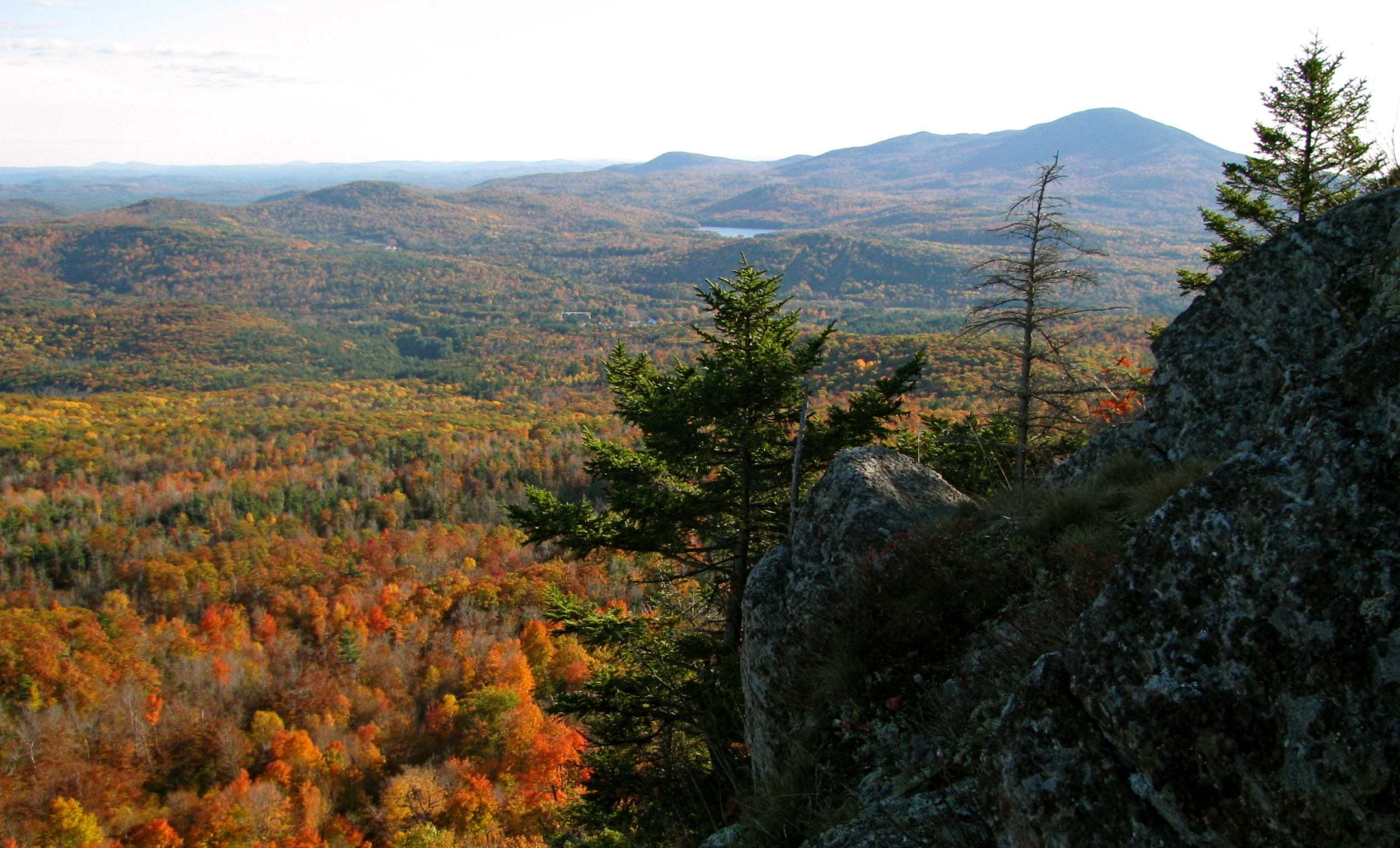
- View of Mount Kearsarge from The Bulkhead on Ragged Mountain

Highest point
- Elevation: 2,937 ft (895 m)
- Prominence: 2,080 ft (630 m)
- Coordinates: 43°23′00″N 71°51′25″W

Geography
- Location: Merrimack County, New Hampshire, U.S.
- Topo map: USGS Andover (NH)

Mount Kearsarge is a mountain located in Wilmot, New Hampshire, and Warner, New Hampshire. Two state parks are located at the northern and southern bases of the mountain—Winslow State Park and Rollins State Park, respectively—and the entire mountain is within Kearsarge Mountain State Forest. On a very clear day, skyscrapers in the city of Boston 80 miles (130 km) away are visible from the fire tower on the summit. The summit has remained bare since a 1796 forest fire.

The name of the mountain evolved from a 1652 rendering of the native Pennacook tribal name for the mountain, Carasarga, which it is surmised means "notch-pointed-mountain of pines".

== Geography ==
Kearsarge is a monadnock, and although of only moderate elevation, its isolation gives it 2,100 ft (640 m) of relative height above the low ground separating it from the higher mountains farther north. That makes Kearsarge one of twelve mountains in New Hampshire with a prominence over 2,000 ft (610 m).

Mount Kearsarge stands within the watershed of the Merrimack River, which drains into the Gulf of Maine. The western slopes of the mountain drain into Cascade Brook, which flows north to the Blackwater River, a stream which flows around the northern and eastern base of Kearsarge, eventually draining into the Contoocook River, a tributary of the Merrimack. The northern and eastern slopes of the mountain drain more directly into the Blackwater River. The southern face of Mount Kearsarge drains into Meadow Brook, a tributary of the Warner River, which flows southeast to the Contoocook River.

Kearsarge is a popular hiking destination. The summit is the high point along the 75-mile (120 km) Sunapee-Ragged-Kearsarge Greenway hiking trail which links 10 towns and encircles the Kearsarge-Lake Sunapee region of western New Hampshire. The quickest route to the top is from the Rollins State Park picnic area on the mountain's south ridge, accessible via Kearsarge Mountain Road from the town of Warner. Access on the mountain's western side is from the picnic area of Winslow State Park via the Winslow Trail (1.1 mi (1.8 km)) or the Barlow Trail (1.6 mi (2.6 km)), built in 1997 by Trailwrights, a volunteer trail group, for the SRK Greenway. The full Greenway section hike on Mt. Kearsarge covers 5.8 miles (9.3 km) from Winslow picnic area via the Barlow Trail to the summit and via the Rollins and Lincoln trails southwesterly to Kearsarge Valley Road in North Sutton.

The Winslow Trail and the state park on the Wilmot side are named after Admiral John Winslow, the commander of the USS Kearsarge, which in June 1864 sank the CSS Alabama in the English Channel in a famous Civil War sea battle. More directly, the park is named after a hotel that stood on the grounds, the Winslow House, site of the current picnic grounds.

Mt. Kearsarge is a notable landmark to Colby-Sawyer College as the location of an annual hiking event held by the college called "Mountain Day," a school tradition reported to originate in the mid-1800s. It is known definitively however that the college community has summited the mountain every year since the 1930s with the only exception being in 2020 due to the COVID-19 pandemic.

== See also ==
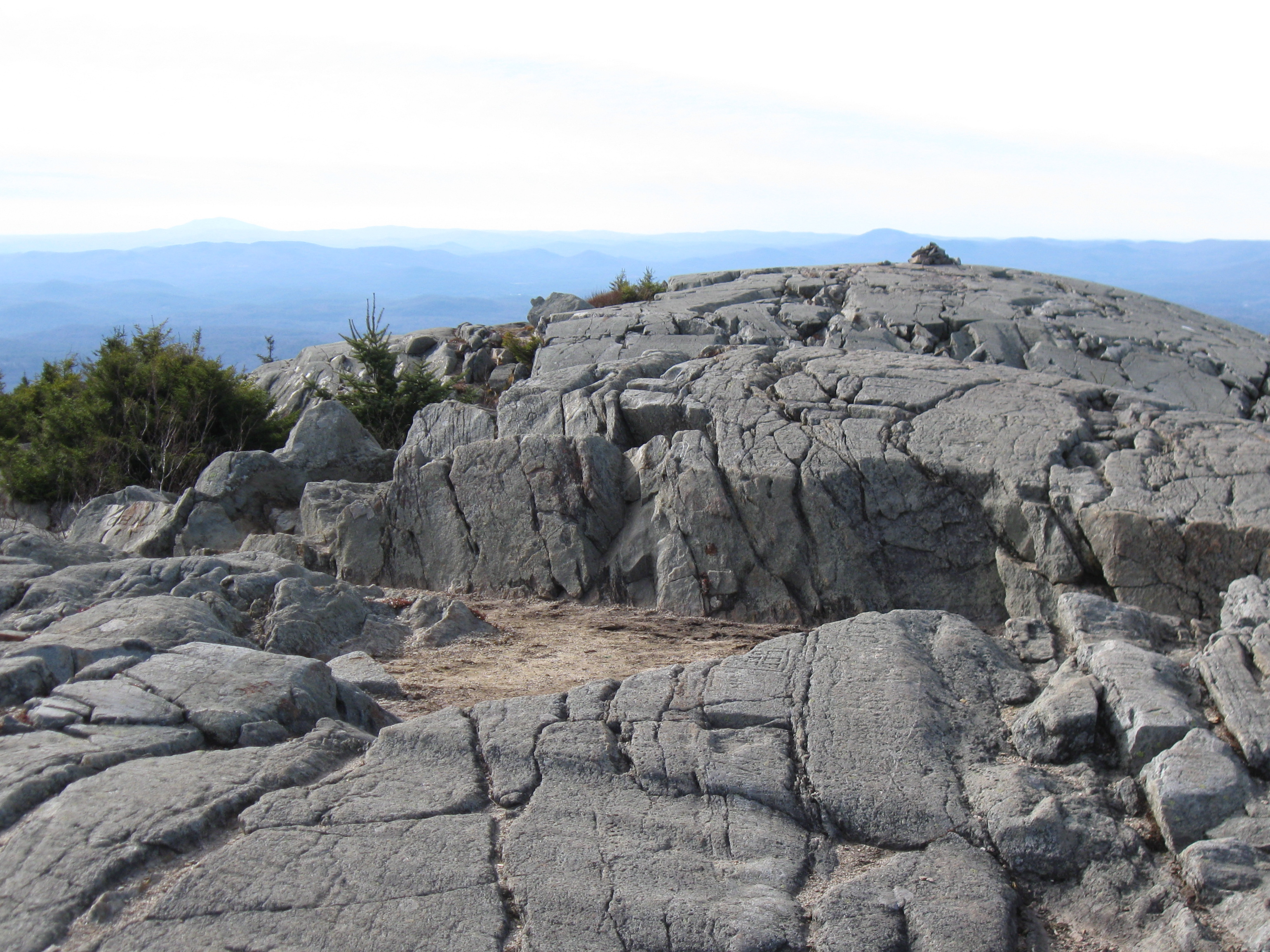
Summit of Mt. Kearsarge

- Kearsarge North
- List of mountains of New Hampshire
- New Hampshire Historical Marker No. 243: Mount Kearsarge and the U.S.S. Kearsarge
- USS Kearsarge
