= Wilmot, New Hampshire =

- Town
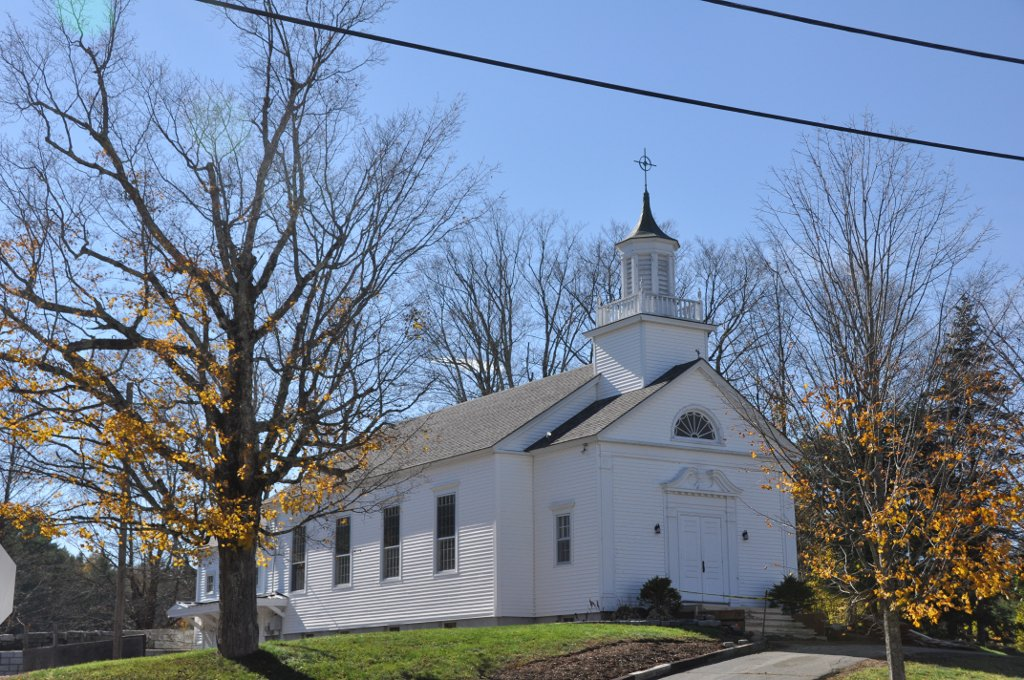
- Wilmot Baptist Church, in Wilmot Flat

- Seal

- Location in Merrimack County and the state of New Hampshire.
- Coordinates: 43°27′03″N 71°54′48″W
- Country: United States
- State: New Hampshire
- County: Merrimack
- Incorporated: 1807
- Villages: Wilmot; Wilmot Flat; North Wilmot

Area
  - Total: 29.6 sq mi (76.7 km^{2})
  - Land: 29.4 sq mi (76.2 km^{2})
  - Water: 0.19 sq mi (0.5 km^{2}) 0.70%
- Elevation: 879 ft (268 m)

Population (2020)
  - Total: 1,407
  - Density: 48/sq mi (18.5/km^{2})
- Time zone: UTC-5 (Eastern)
  - Summer (DST): UTC-4 (Eastern)
- ZIP code: 03287
- Area code: 603
- FIPS code: 33-84900
- GNIS feature ID: 873755
- Website: www.wilmotnh.org

Wilmot is a town in Merrimack County, New Hampshire, United States. The population was 1,407 at the 2020 census. The town includes the communities of Wilmot, Wilmot Flat, and North Wilmot.

== History ==
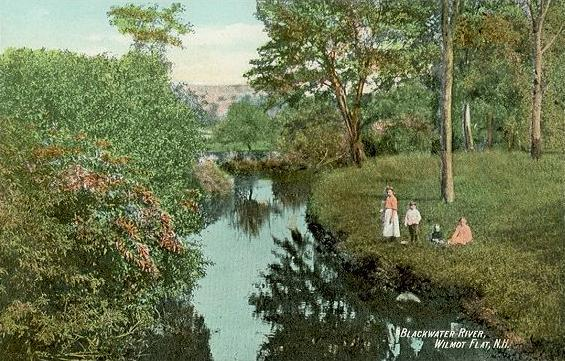
Blackwater River c. 1910

Incorporated in 1807 from part of New London, the Kearsarge gore, and a small piece of New Chester (later renamed Hill), the town took its name from Dr. James Wilmot, an English clergyman who had spoken out against England's treatment of the American colonies. Dr. Wilmot was rector at Barton-on-the-Heath in Warwickshire, England.

== Geography ==
Wilmot is in northwestern Merrimack County, in the Dartmouth–Lake Sunapee Region of New Hampshire. According to the United States Census Bureau, the town has a total area of 29.6 square miles (76.7 km^{2}), of which 29.4 square miles (76.2 km^{2}) are land and 0.2 square miles (0.5 km^{2}), or 0.70%, are water. Wilmot is drained by Cascade Brook (two branches), Kimpton Brook, and Frazier Brook, all of which flow to the Blackwater River in neighboring Andover. The entire town is part of the Merrimack River watershed. Wilmot is dotted with several large ponds, including Eagle, Butterfield, Piper, White, Tannery, and Chase ponds. The Sunapee–Ragged–Kearsarge (SRK) Greenway traverses the town, crossing Bog Mountain in the northern part of town and climbing Mount Kearsarge in the south.

The village of Wilmot is near the center of the town, along New Hampshire Route 4A. Wilmot Flat is a village in the southern part of the town, served by New Hampshire Route 11. North Wilmot is a rural community centered on the junction of North Wilmot Road and Breezy Hill Road, north of White Pond.

Mount Kearsarge, elevation 2,931 feet (893 m) above sea level, on the southern border, is the highest point in town and in Merrimack County. Winslow State Park, at the northern foot of the mountain, provides access by two hiking trails to the summit. The state park and the Winslow Trail are named after Captain John Winslow, the commander of the USS Kearsarge, which in June 1864 sank the CSS Alabama in the English Channel in a famous Civil War sea battle.

The town is the home of Camps Kenwood and Evergreen on Eagle Pond.

=== Adjacent municipalities ===
- Grafton (north)
- Danbury (northeast)
- Andover (east)
- Warner (south)
- Sutton (southwest)
- New London (west)
- Springfield (northwest)

== Demographics ==
Historical population
Census	Pop.	Note	%±
1810	298		—
1820	670		124.8%
1830	834		24.5%
1840	1,212		45.3%
1850	1,272		5.0%
1860	1,195		−6.1%
1870	1,072		−10.3%
1880	1,080		0.7%
1890	840		−22.2%
1900	653		−22.3%
1910	614		−6.0%
1920	536		−12.7%
1930	495		−7.6%
1940	466		−5.9%
1950	370		−20.6%
1960	391		5.7%
1970	516		32.0%
1980	725		40.5%
1990	935		29.0%
2000	1,144		22.4%
2010	1,358		18.7%
2020	1,407		3.6%
U.S. Decennial Census

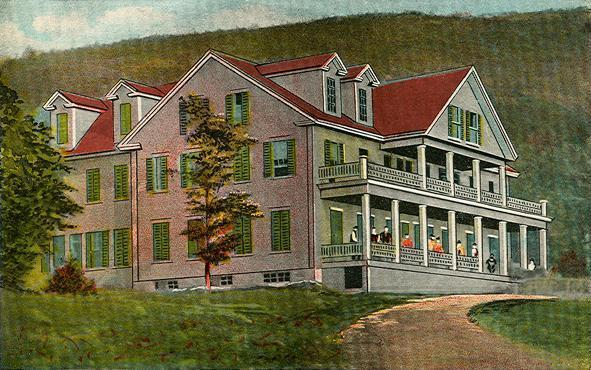
Winslow House c. 1900

As of the census of 2000, there were 1,144 people, 459 households, and 329 families residing in the town. The population density was 38.7 inhabitants per square mile (14.9/km^{2}). There were 530 housing units at an average density of 17.9 per square mile (6.9/km^{2}). The racial makeup of the town was 98.25% White, 0.09% African American, 0.09% Native American, 0.61% Asian, 0.09% Pacific Islander, and 0.87% from two or more races. Hispanic or Latino of any race were 0.26% of the population.

There were 459 households, out of which 34.2% had children under the age of 18 living with them, 60.6% were married couples living together, 7.4% had a female householder with no husband present, and 28.3% were non-families. 22.4% of all households were made up of individuals, and 7.4% had someone living alone who was 65 years of age or older. The average household size was 2.49 and the average family size was 2.93.

In the town, the population was spread out, with 26.0% under the age of 18, 4.4% from 18 to 24, 27.0% from 25 to 44, 29.5% from 45 to 64, and 13.1% who were 65 years of age or older. The median age was 42 years. For every 100 females, there were 93.6 males. For every 100 females age 18 and over, there were 93.4 males.

The median income for a household in the town was $49,605, and the median income for a family was $57,143. Males had a median income of $37,857 versus $30,278 for females. The per capita income for the town was $25,629. About 1.8% of families and 4.4% of the population were below the poverty line, including 5.8% of those under age 18 and 1.4% of those age 65 or over.

== Notable people ==
- George E. Dickey (1840–1900), architect
- Donald Hall (1928–2018), United States Poet Laureate (2006)
- Jane Kenyon (1947–1995), poet, translator
- Tom Schamberg (born 1946), politician
