= Winslow State Park =

State park in Merrimack County, New Hampshire

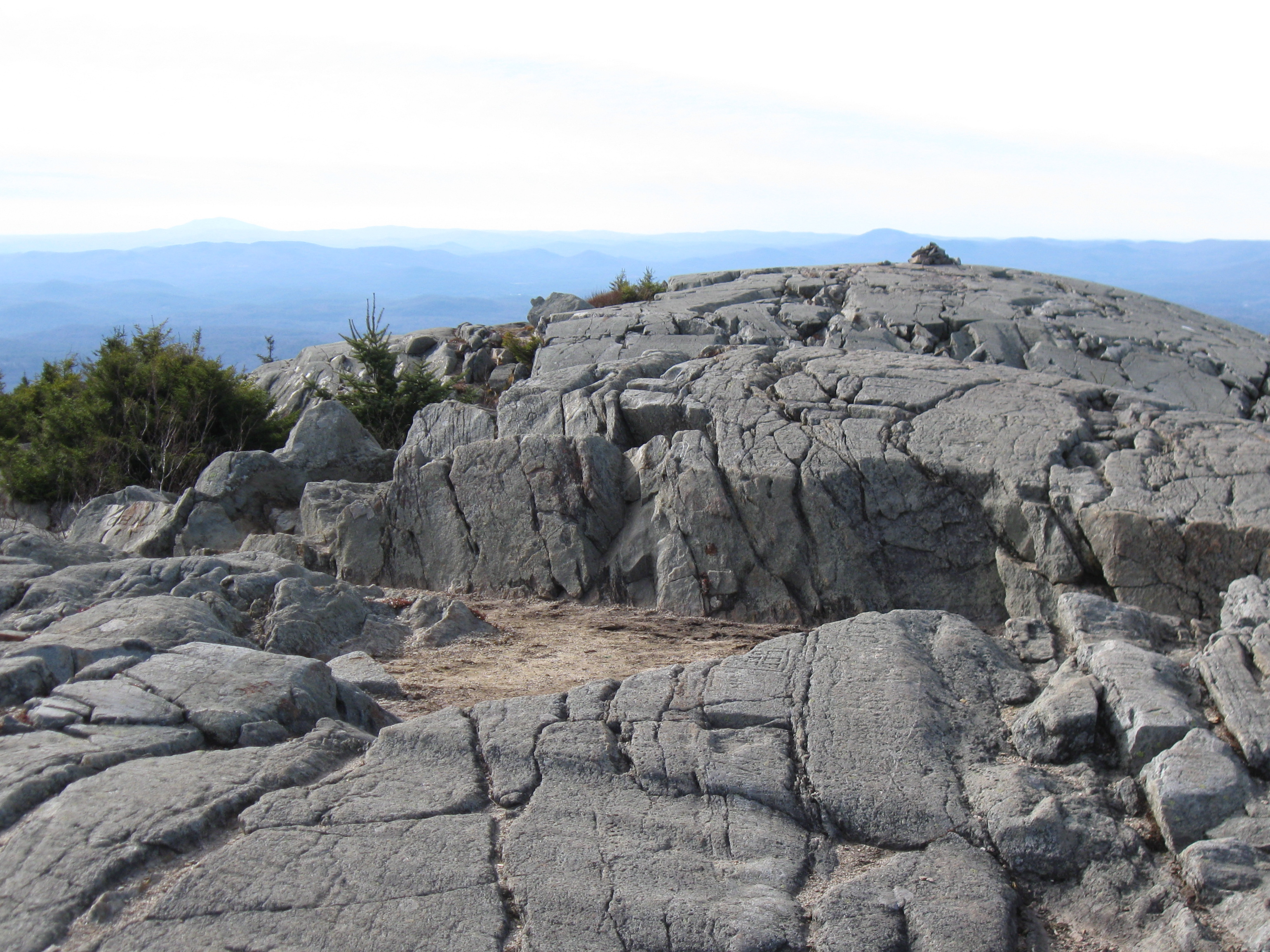
- Summit of Mount Kearsage

- Location within New Hampshire
- Interactive map of Winslow State Park
- Location: Wilmot, New Hampshire, United States
- Coordinates: 43°23′24″N 71°52′04″W
- Elevation: 1,820 feet (550 m)
- Established: 1935
- Administrator: New Hampshire Division of Parks and Recreation
- Website: Official website
- New Hampshire State Parks

Winslow State Park is a public recreation area located on the northwest slope of Mount Kearsarge in Wilmot, New Hampshire. The state park features a picnic area on an 1,820-foot (550 m) plateau with views of the White Mountains to the north. A 1.1-mile (1.8 km) foot trail (the Winslow Trail) leads from the picnic area to the summit of Mount Kearsarge. (Note: Kearsarge Mountain State Forest surrounds the mountain's summit.) A 1.7-mile (2.7 km) trail (the Barlow Trail) offers a loop possibility.

== History ==
The park is named after a 19th-century hotel, Winslow House, which was in turn named for Admiral John Winslow, the Civil War commander of USS Kearsarge. A cellar hole in the park's picnic area is all that remains of the hotel. The site became a state park in 1935.

== Greenway ==
The park is on the Sunapee-Ragged-Kearsarge Greenway, a 75-mile (121 km) loop trail that also passes Rollins State Park, Mount Sunapee State Park, and Wadleigh State Park, as well as Gile, Kearsarge and Shadow Hill state forests and the Bog Mountain Wildlife Management Area.
