= Mount Sunapee Resort =

Ski area in New Hampshire, United States

Coordinates: 43°19′50″N 72°04′48″W

- Interactive map of Mount Sunapee Resort
- Location: Newbury, New Hampshire
- Nearest city: Claremont, New Hampshire
- Status: Operating
- Owner: Vail Resorts
- Vertical: 1,513 ft (461 m)
- Top elevation: 2,743 ft (836 m)
- Base elevation: 1,230 ft (370 m)
- Skiable area: 230 acres (93 ha)
- Trails: 66; 26% Beginner; 48% Intermediate; 26% Expert
- Lift system: 2 HSQ, 1 Quad, 2 Triples, 1 Double, 5 Surface
- Terrain parks: Yes, four
- Snowfall: 100 inches (250 cm)
- Snowmaking: Yes, 97% of terrain
- Website: www.mountsunapee.com

Mount Sunapee Resort is a ski area and resort located in Mount Sunapee State Park in Newbury, New Hampshire, United States.

== History ==
Mount Sunapee's history as a ski area dates back to as early as 1940, when in response to the success of a tram at Cannon Mountain a survey was made for a similar tram on Mount Sunapee. The following year, the state of New Hampshire passed the Mt. Sunapee Tramway Bill, which proposed the construction of a tram intended for sightseeing, though it was expected also to be used for skiing. After World War II, the proposal was revisited, but it was found that the state didn't have enough money to construct a tram. Instead, a chairlift was built, to the present-day location of North Peak.

During the 1950s and 1960s, the ski area continued to expand, with the construction of several surface lifts and chairlifts, including the opening of the summit of Mount Sunapee, above the original North Peak. Additional trails were cut and lifts installed until the 1980s. The first snowmaking capability was installed in 1982.

By the 1990s, however, the resort's facilities required more improvement than the state, which at the time still owned and operated it, had invested. In 1998, the Mueller family, which operated and had significantly improved the Okemo Mountain Resort in Vermont, began leasing Sunapee from the state of New Hampshire. Two new expansions for the ski area were proposed soon after this—the East Bowl and the West Bowl. Due to the presence of old-growth forest in the proposed East Bowl, this proposal was dropped in 2000. Sunapee went ahead with the West Bowl project, and purchased 656 acres (265 ha) of land. The expansion would include the addition of 75 acres (30 ha) of skiable terrain and two lifts in the West Bowl, as well as upgrading the facilities on the main mountain, including the introduction of night skiing. New Hampshire governor John Lynch, however, was opposed to the project, which as a result was placed on indefinite hold. Instead, capital improvements were limited to the existing terrain, on which new lifts and snowmaking were built, as well as a new lodge.

In the summer of 2012 Sunapee opened a new "Adventure Center", which features a canopy zipline tour, a treetop obstacle course, guided Segway excursions, disc golf and daily rides up the Clipper Ship quad. This new expansion marked the beginning of an effort by Sunapee to become a four-season resort.

For the 2014-15 season, the Sun Bowl Quad was replaced with a Poma High-Speed Detachable Quad purchased from Okemo in Vermont.

On April 16, 2015, Sunapee was given a conditional go-ahead on their West Bowl Expansion. The new complex was to be completed by 2018, and would include replacing the Sunapee Express Quad with a High Speed Six-Pack.

Vail Resorts announced on June 4, 2018, that it had acquired Mount Sunapee, along with Vermont's Okemo Mountain ski resort and Colorado's Crested Butte. Sunapee's original season pass has been replaced with Vail's Epic Pass, which as of 2019 also gave the season pass holders access to the ski areas formerly owned by Peak Resorts (acquired by Vail that fall).

== Mountain statistics ==
Mount Sunapee Resort has three lodges, the Spruce Lodge, the Base Lodge and the Summit Lodge, 66 trails spread over 230 acres (93 ha) of skiable terrain. 26% of the trails are rated as easy, 49% are rated as intermediate, and 25% are rated as advanced. There are three terrain parks, and 97% of the terrain has snowmaking installed on it. Sunapee has ten lifts—two detachable quads, one fixed-grip quad, two triples, a double, and four surface lifts. The mountain's base elevation is at 1,230 feet (370 m) and the summit is at 2,743 feet (836 m), for a vertical drop of 1,513 feet (461 m). Mount Sunapee receives about 100 inches (250 cm) of snow each year.

== Events ==
The resort is home to the Mount Sunapee Slush Cup, an annual event where participants welcome the coming of spring by attempting to ski or snowboard across a 90-ft. man-made pond. "Slushers" race down a 365-foot (111 m) slope to brave the ice-cold water and compete in several age groups for titles like "Best Skim", "Best Costume", and "Best Splash". Locals and Slush Cup enthusiasts celebrated the 13th annual Sunapee Slush Cup in April 2011.

Every August, beginning on the first Saturday and ending on the following Sunday, Mount Sunapee Resort is host to the nine day long League of New Hampshire Craftsmen's Fair, billed as "the oldest craft fair in America". This craft fair has taken place annually since 1934.

== Additional state park facilities ==
Mount Sunapee State Park beach on Lake Sunapee, also known as Newbury Beach, is just off the traffic circle at the entrance to the state park. The beach has a store, canoe and kayak rentals, a playground, and a new bathhouse. A boat launch is available with some restrictions.
