= Rollins State Park =

State park in Merrimack County, New Hampshire

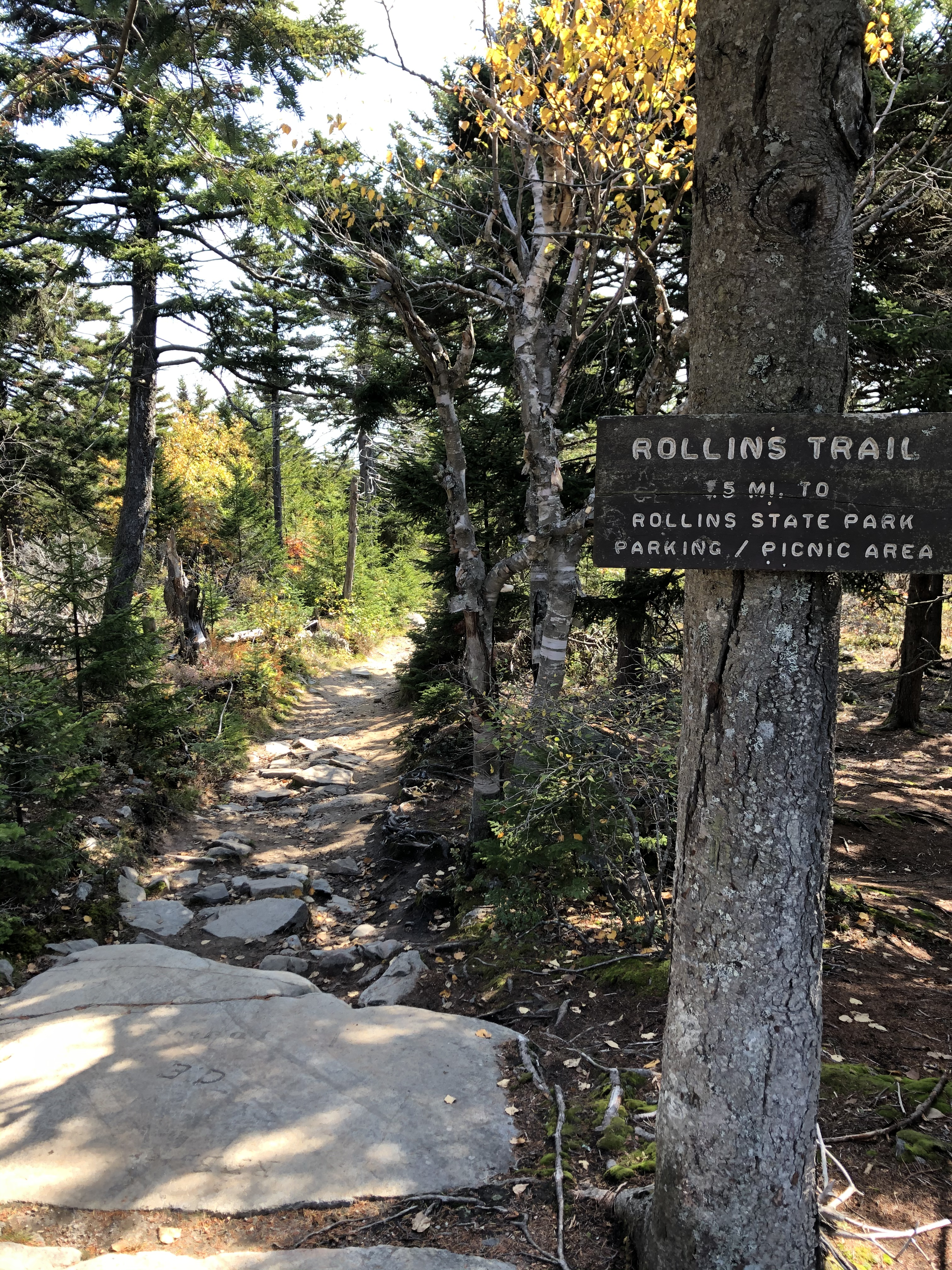
- Rollins Trail departing summit of Mount Kearsarge

- Location within New Hampshire
- Interactive map of Rollins State Park
- Location: Warner, New Hampshire, United States
- Coordinates: 43°20′45″N 71°50′58″W
- Area: 118.5 acres (48.0 ha)
- Elevation: 1,093 feet (333 m)
- Established: 1950
- Administrator: New Hampshire Division of Parks and Recreation
- Named for: Frank W. Rollins
- Website: Official website
- New Hampshire State Parks

Rollins State Park is a public recreation area on the southern slope of Mount Kearsarge in Warner, New Hampshire. The state park is at the entrance to an auto road that ascends to within 0.5 miles (0.8 km) of the summit. Picnic facilities are available, and hiking trails leave from the high point of the auto road to the summit. The park is named for Frank W. Rollins, who served as governor of New Hampshire from 1899 to 1901.

== Greenway ==
The park is on the Sunapee-Ragged-Kearsarge Greenway, a 75-mile (121 km) loop trail that also passes Winslow State Park, on the northwest flank of Mount Kearsarge, Mount Sunapee State Park, and Wadleigh State Park, as well as Gile, Kearsarge and Shadow Hill state forests and the Bog Mountain Wildlife Management Area.
