= Pillsbury State Park =

State park in Sullivan County, New Hampshire

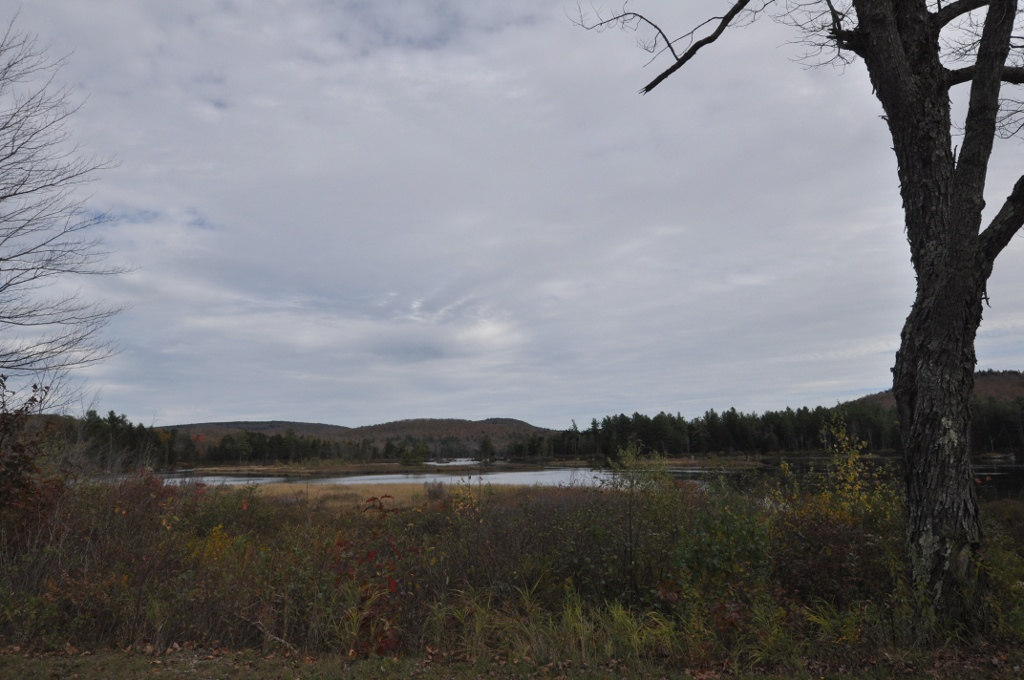

- Location within New Hampshire
- Interactive map of Pillsbury State Park
- Location: Washington & Goshen, New Hampshire, United States
- Coordinates: 43°13′51″N 72°05′59″W
- Area: 4,456 acres (1,803 ha)
- Elevation: 1,755 feet (535 m)
- Established: 1920 (purchase); 1952 (opening)
- Administrator: New Hampshire Division of Parks and Recreation
- Website: Official website
- New Hampshire State Parks

Pillsbury State Park is a state park located mainly in Washington and partially in Goshen, New Hampshire, in the United States. It is home to the headwaters of the Ashuelot River. It contains one of the more rustic campgrounds in the state park system, with no electricity and limited running water. There are 40 campsites, most of which are reservable. Eleven of the sites are at "remote" locations, most of which are accessible by canoe. Hiking trails connect to the 51-mile-long (82 km) Monadnock-Sunapee Greenway trail.
