= Center Meetinghouse =

Historic church in New Hampshire, United States

- U.S. National Register of Historic Places
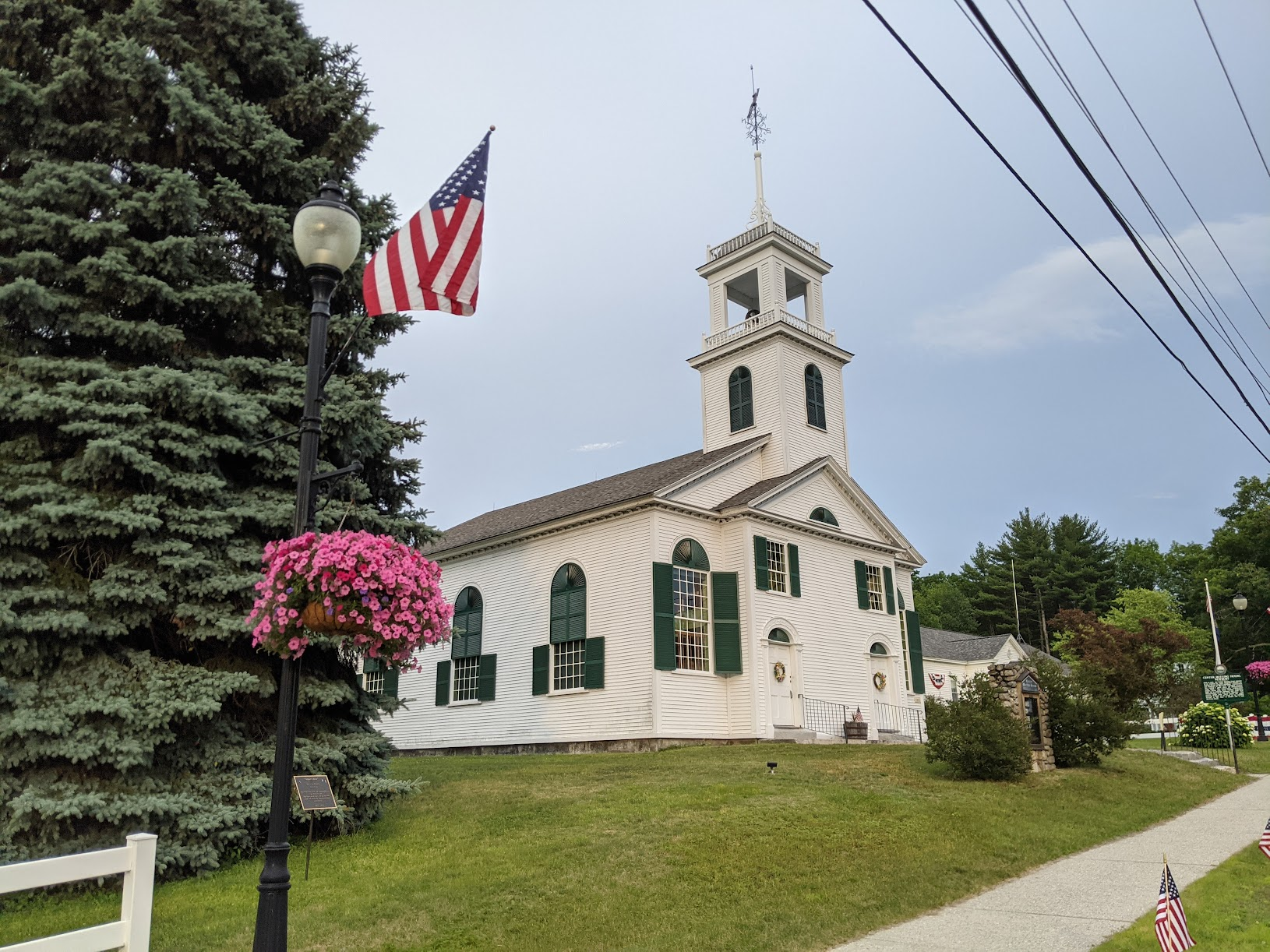
- The building in 2021

- Location within New Hampshire Location within the United States
- Location: NH 103, Newbury, New Hampshire
- Coordinates: 43°19′16″N 72°2′8″W
- Area: less than one acre
- Built: 1832
- Architectural style: Federal
- NRHP reference No.: 79000201
- Added to NRHP: December 19, 1979

The Center Meetinghouse is a historic meetinghouse on NH 103 in Newbury, New Hampshire. The Federal-style church building was built c. 1832, a relatively late date for the style. It replaced a 1797 meetinghouse that had been located about a mile away. It is further believed to be distinctive in New Hampshire as the only Federal period church in which the pulpit is located at the rear of the auditorium. Originally built to be used by multiple religious denominations, it is now operated by a local nonprofit organization as a community center. It was listed on the National Register of Historic Places in 1979.

== Description and history ==
The Center Meetinghouse occupies a prominent site in the center of Newbury's main village, overlooking the southern end of Lake Sunapee at the eastern corner of the junction of New Hampshire Routes 103 and 103A. It is a single-story wood-frame structure, with a gabled roof and clapboarded exterior. The front gable rake edges and main eaves are studded with modillion blocks. An entry section projects slightly on the front facade, flanked on either side by tall sash windows topped by half-round fans. There are two symmetrically placed entrances, each flanked by pilasters, which rise to a segmented-arch cornice. A two-stage tower rises above the front, with round-arch louvered openings in the first stage, which is topped by a cornice and balustrade. The second stage is open, with clapboarded square columns rising to a similar but smaller cornice and balustrade. A spire rises at the peak. The interior retains many period features. It has its original box pews, oriented to face the rear of the main chamber, where the decoratively carved pulpit is in an elevated position between the two entrance aisles.

The meetinghouse is built in 1832, when the Federal style in which it was built was giving way to the Greek Revival. Its woodwork is a well-preserved example of the former style, showing no traces of the influence of the latter. It is believed to be the only Federal period church in the state that retains the rear pulpit position, which was often altered due to changing tastes in the 19th century. The building was constructed by a "Religious Toleration Society", and was made available to several local church congregations. The building's condition declined in the late 19th century, as the town's population also declined, and it was given an early restoration in 1892 through the work of nearby resident John Hay. In 1932, the building was turned over to a poorly funded board of trustees, and again declined in condition in the 20th century. It was given a full restoration by a new community group in 2005.

== See also ==
- National Register of Historic Places listings in Merrimack County, New Hampshire
- New Hampshire Historical Marker No. 81: Center Meeting House
