= Billy B. Van =

American entertainer

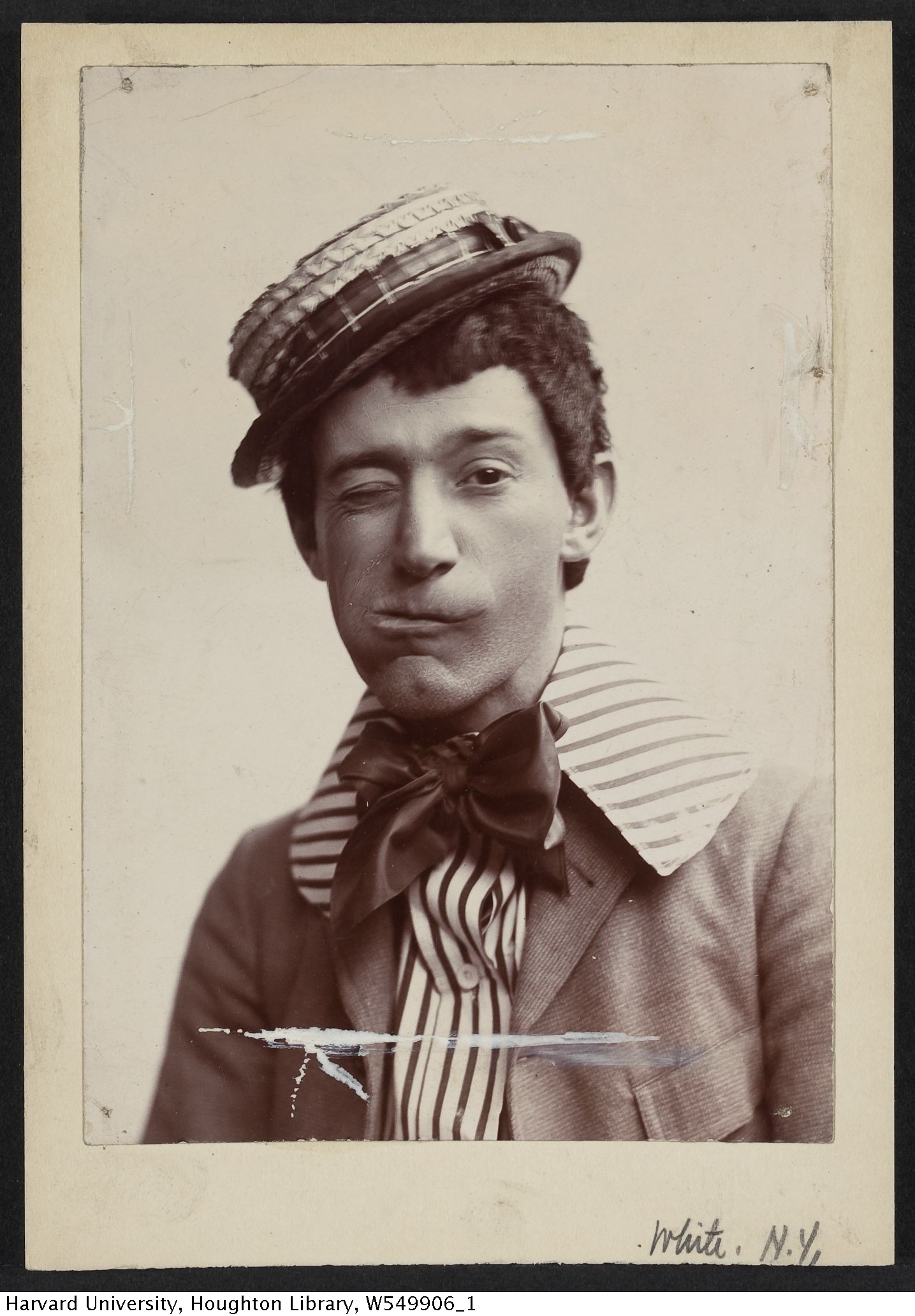
Billy B. Van

Billy B. Van (born William Webster Van de Grift; August 3, 1870 – November 16, 1950) was an American entertainer who performed in minstrel shows, vaudeville, burlesque, on the New York stage, and in films, founding his own movie company. In recent years some of his silent films, long thought lost, have been discovered, like Where Are Your Husbands?, found in 2017 in the collections of the Library of Congress, or the 1919 comedy Van-ar-chy, found by a student in an antique shop in Sendai, Japan, in 2026. Later in life, he became a motivational speaker.

== Biography ==
=== Early life ===
Billy B. Van was born William Webster Van de Grift on August 3, 1870, in Pottstown, Pennsylvania. Van sometimes stated he was born in 1871. His parents were George W. Van de Grift, a railroad engineer, and Henrietta Van de Grift. His grandfather was a dairyman from the Netherlands.

=== Early entertainer years ===
Van's entertainment career spanned several decades, from about the late 1870s to the late 1920s. His career reflected broader trends in popular American entertainment. He began in minstrel shows, often performing in blackface, and later worked in vaudeville and burlesque. Later in his career, he performed in legitimate stage theater and worked as a producer and actor in silent motion pictures.

According to later accounts, Van's acting career began after his family moved to Philadelphia. In 1879, J. C. Stewart, a well-known manager, advertised for a child actor to appear in a production of H.M.S. Pinafore. Van auditioned successfully, but was cast as Master Willie Van because Stewart thought his full name was too long. Van later changed his acting name to William Van, then Billy Van, and finally to Billy B. Van to avoid confusion with another actor named Billy Van.

At 14, he was playing with a minstrel troupe in Atlantic City called Trocadero, earning a salary of $10 per day. By 20, he was reported to be playing in vaudeville and burlesque productions with a stock company in Washington, D.C..

Being in the theatre likely did not align with his parents' goals. His father got him a job in his teens at the Brill Car Co., where he was reported to have spent his time entertaining the workers. He was unsuccessful in formal education, later saying that he was a "graduate of the school of hard knocks", although much later he was made an honorary member of the Dartmouth College Class of 1906.

=== Georges Mills, New Hampshire ===
Around 1897, Van moved to the small village of Georges Mills, New Hampshire. The village, which then had a population in the hundreds, is located on a harbor on Lake Sunapee, a large lake in the western part of the state. He was diagnosed with tuberculosis while acting in Boston, and a fellow actor recommended Lake Sunapee. In his quasi-autobiography, Van described himself as poor and living in a barn for months while recuperating.

After returning to the stage, he accumulated enough money to buy property in Georges Mills. This included a large plot of land on Prospect Hill, now 360 Prospect Hill, where he had Frank Holmes, a local contractor, build a large stone house and barns with a silo. On the hill, Van owned a large herd of registered Guernsey cows.

He also established a presence on a large lot right on the harbor, constructing a casino and a playhouse, an indoor and outdoor studio, dressing rooms, and accommodations for 75 people. He named the site Van Casino and referred to Georges Mills as "Van Harbor".

He staged plays in New York during the summer. He brought performers such as Ethel Barrymore, Jeanne Eagels, and Marie Dressler to New York to appear in his theater productions, and acted with many of them during the winter.

In 1915, Van began filming several silent movies as part of the New York company Equity Motion Pictures. Two of these films were Zooloo Nightmare and The Lucky Hoodoo.

A "toy projector" clip from one of Billy B. Van's silent comedies

In recent years, efforts have recovered some of his lost silent films. John Tariot, a historian and restorer of silent films, established a website devoted to Van's movie career. He has found The Lucky Hoodoo, Where Are Your Husbands?, and other films.

In filming these movies, Van used local residents as bit actors, some of whom performed in blackface. One of the actors, Lee Collins, was a local resident who later had a career as a choreographer on Broadway.

One article stated, with some exaggeration, that Van owned all of Georges Mills except the jail. Another stated that the initial excitement among local people about the stars, technicians, and vehicles eventually wore off. Residents reportedly disliked the actors "parading around in outlandish costumes and makeup and introducing their large snorting automobiles to the quiet village", leaving little room for horses and buggies. One article stated that local opposition led him to move to nearby Newport, New Hampshire.

=== Long and varied stage career ===
Van often performed with a pair of vaudeville and variety-show actors known as the Beaumont Sisters. For a time, he owned a company called Billy B. Van and The Beaumont Sisters Co. In 1910, they headlined a variety-show production at the Manhattan Opera House, along with other acts such as the Five Juggling Jewels and Dunlap's Educated Horse. One account states Van had been married to Nellie Beaumont.

A list of the plays in which Van appeared is available in the Internet Broadway Database (IBDB). With some notes added, these include:

- 1903: The Jersey Lily; Van was in a burlesque scene with a star described as wearing elaborate costumes.
- 1905: The Errand Boy; he appeared with Rose Beaumont and a large group of chorus girls.
- 1907: Patsy in Politics; a later article raises the question whether the term "a patsy" came from this play.
- 1908: Little Nemo; Van was listed as the star, and the production ran for 111 performances.
- 1917: Have a Heart; Van played the lead role of Henry. The book was by P.G. Wodehouse and Guy Bolton, with music by Jerome Kern. Van was criticized as having a tendency toward vaudeville-style performance.
- 1918: The Rainbow Girl.
- 1923: Adrienne.
- 1925: Artists and Models; Van appeared in this production, which ran for about 416 performances.
- 1925: Gay Paree.
- 1928: Sunny Days; Jeanette MacDonald was the star.

At one point in his career, he was described as one of the most amusing men on the vaudeville stage.

A notable part of Van's stage career was his association with the former heavyweight boxing champion, James J. Corbett. They appeared together in a sketch called "Spirited Travesty" in 1922 as part of a variety show. Together, they toured the United States, and also toured Europe for eight weeks.

Van appeared with many performers who remained well known, including Jeanette MacDonald, Fatty Arbuckle, Hal Roach, and Harold Lloyd. He is mentioned in the biographies of many with whom he was associated, including MacDonald, Wodehouse, and Corbett. The theaters of this period were in the area of Fourteenth Street, and the term "Broadway shows" came into wider use later. Van also toured with many of these shows. He and the Beaumont Sisters played at the Orpheum in Los Angeles in 1915.

Elbert Hubbard was enthusiastic about Van. In 1913, in his Philistine journal, he described Van as someone who "frivols and frolics all day long, on and off the stage". He added, "He is the eternal rube who has lifted rubism to the realm of art".

Van was also the founder of the Equity Motion Picture Company, which may have been an extension of the Van Harbor Casino Movie Co. Accounts differ on what became of the company. One account says that it moved to Hollywood as part of the industry's westward shift. Another says that it merged with Mayer (MGM), or with one of the companies that later formed MGM, although this appears to be uncertain.

Van appeared in at least one movie, Beauty Shop, in 1922, playing the role of Sobini. Jim Corbett also appeared in the 70-minute film, which was about a beauty doctor.

Van also performed outside the theater. The New York Times reported that in 1925 he appeared with Al Jolson, Harry Hirshfeld, and others for the first anniversary celebration of the Gimbel Brothers radio station, WGBS. That same year, he was one of the entertainers in a vaudeville show by William Morris at the Royal Arch Masons Hall. He also appeared with other well-known performers at a goat-judging contest in Central Park in 1934, as part of a Bock beer festival. Van also had a half-hour radio show on the CBS network for a time.

Van retired from the stage in 1927, with one article implying that this was due to health reasons. He appears to have returned only once, in a Mae West show in 1949.

=== Agricultural career ===
A 1917 article in The New York Times described Van as having a second career in dairy farming and agricultural affairs under his birth name, William Vandegrift. The article contrasted Billy B. Van, the stage performer known to New York audiences, with Vandegrift as a speaker and adviser on dairy farming. It also described him as one of the seven best-qualified authorities on dairy management, although the account itself relied partly on information provided by Van himself.

The article described a Nebraska businessman attending a Broadway play in which Van appeared and recognizing him as William Vandegrift, who had spoken at a Nebraska agricultural school. The businessman went backstage and learned that Van had a second career, which he reportedly tried to keep separate from his theatrical work. The reporter stated that when Van toured as a performer, he also tried to arrange talks at agricultural colleges or societies.

Van's interest in agriculture was linked in the article to his Dutch ancestry and to dairy practices used by his grandfather, which Van later promoted. He also drew on his own experience as a dairy farmer in New Hampshire. The Times article discussed other agricultural work attributed to Van, including his role as an advisor on the suitability of land in the San Joaquin Valley for dairy purposes.

=== Life in Newport, New Hampshire ===
Van moved to Newport, New Hampshire, around 1915, when the town had a population of about 4,000. He built a large home with barns on a site behind what is now the Hilltop Hotel on the north side of present-day Route 11. He bought a farm known as Cutting Farm, on the south side of Route 11, which he used as pasture.

Van married Grace Walsh in 1922. Walsh, who was from Syracuse, had a stage career. She is listed as appearing in five productions, from The Rich Mr. Hoggenheimer in 1906 to Virginia in 1927. Walsh lived in Newport while Van traveled frequently, and one article refers to an unhappy marriage and a period of discontent. They had three children.

Van became involved in Newport life during the years he lived there. He promoted Newport and, more broadly, New England products. He is widely credited with coining the town's nickname, "The Sunshine City", by which it is still known, although the term may not refer directly to the weather. He was often referred to as the town's honorary mayor, although he was sometimes incorrectly described as its actual mayor. A sketch of Van at the Newport Historical Society describes him as a common and voluble presence at town meetings. One article states that he served as a justice of the peace in Newport.

News clips from the period describe Van's efforts to promote the area based on the fact that Sarah Josepha Hale, author of "Mary Had a Little Lamb", had lived nearby. This effort appears to have created controversy, which Van helped fuel. Local clips also show that he started a national group for needy children after World War I called the Children's Sunshine Dinner Club.

The Newport Historical Society has some Van memorabilia, including a trunk bearing his name that was used for travel.

=== Business career ===
Van's principal business venture was the Pine Tree Products Co., which he established around 1922. The company was incorporated in New York, although its products were apparently made in New Hampshire. Its main products were soap and bath oil. One writer stated that Van experimented for 15 years before developing the soap formula, which was based on vegetable oil. One article stated that he sold one million cakes of soap in a year, while another stated that the soap was used at the Palmer House in Chicago.

In addition to the Palmer House, the soap was used at the Hotel Fontenelle in Omaha, Nebraska, the flagship property of Gene Eppley's Hotel Company. The soap was also used at more than 20 other hotels in the Eppley chain. Each small hotel bar of Pine Tree soap contained a coupon that could be sent with one dollar to Pine Tree Products in Newport, New Hampshire, in exchange for eight large bars of soap.

Pine Tree Products appears not to have succeeded, and Van is said to have left the company in the early 1940s. In 1949, he started another soap company, Vanpine, but died the same year.

=== Speaking career and later life ===
After retiring from the stage in 1927, Van shifted his career toward public speaking. He had begun speaking during his acting career, but it became his full-time occupation after 1927.

The first focus of his talks would today be described as motivational speaking. He spoke at the Roosevelt Hotel in New York to the Sales Executive Club. In another talk to the club, in 1937, he was described as a member of the New England Council. He gave examples of companies that had adapted to the difficult economic conditions of the Great Depression; one had shifted from making bobbins to lollipop sticks.

The New York Times reported that in 1931 he spoke in Washington to the Association of National Advertisers. He recommended that his audience read Robinson Crusoe as an example of adapting to difficult times and be on the lookout for a "Friday" to help. Other clips show Van speaking at the Hotel DeSoto in St. Louis at a meeting of the Direct Mail Advertising Association, and in Houston.

The second focus of his talks was self-described as being from a "Yankee Goodwill Ambassador". Van is said to have been friends with Calvin Coolidge and Woodrow Wilson. In 1937, he was described as a "sales educationalist".

Other activities included promoting Wrigley chewing gum on the radio and publishing a book, Snap Out of It, in 1933, which was partly autobiographical.

In 1948, Van visited the Bob and Ray Show on WHDH Boston.

=== Death and legacy ===
Van died in a hospital in Newport on November 16, 1950, aged 79. Obituaries published soon after his death described his career in different ways. Time magazine called him a "palavering onetime vaudeville comic" who advertised chewing gum on radio. The New York Times described him as a longtime trouper and lecturer on Yankee philosophy and credited him with a role in the formation of MGM. The Newport newspaper called him one of the most colorful citizens in the town's history.

Van was buried in Pine Grove Cemetery in Newport, with the grave marked only by a footstone. In 2014, a large headstone was erected in his honor, with a marker installed behind the footstone describing his career. This coincided with renewed interest in Van's career in the Lake Sunapee area. Both the Newport and Sunapee Historical Societies have created exhibits about his life. Study of Van's papers at the Newport Historical Society led to the creation of Jayna H. Hooper's book, Billy B. Van: Newport's Sunshine Peddler (2016).

Van's wife, Grace, appears to have died a few years later. They had three children: Mary Ann Bundgus, who later was a secretary to Arthur Godfrey; Bonnie Grace Harding, who lived in California; and a son, William Van. William died in 1970 and had a small metal grave marker next to his father's stone, but his name is now on the back of his father's headstone. Mary Ann and Bonnie Grace appeared as the Van Sisters in summer stock and with the Shubert organization. The Van Sisters were compared to the Beaumont Sisters from earlier years. At the time of Van's death, he had one grandchild, Peter Van Harding.

== Primary sources ==
- Helga Ketchen, A Beginning Who's Who of Some Citizens of the Town of Newport, N.H., August 1961
- Mary Peterson, A Collection of New Hampshire Stories, Mountaineer Publishing Co., New London, N.H. (1971)
- Rogers Small, As I Recall It (2003), columns by a reporter for the Argus-Champion in Newport
- Van, Billy B. Snap Out of It (1933), self-published.
- "The Double Life of Mr. Van". The New York Times. 1917-01-28.
