= Sunapee =

Sunapee may refer to:

- Sunapee, New Hampshire, a town in the United States
- Lake Sunapee, the lake on which the town is situated
- Mount Sunapee, the nearby mountain
