= Barry Billcliff =

American wrestler (born 1982)

Barry Billcliff (born August 9, 1982) is an American former national wrestler who won the 1996 FHSAA Wrestling Competition. He was part of the American wrestling team from 1995 to 1999. He also participated in the junior Olympics.

Billcliff got national coverage and appeared on talk shows after he and his friend claimed to have found buried treasure.

== Buried treasure case ==
Billcliff along with Timothy Crebase, Matt Ingham, and Kevin Kozak, claimed to have discovered a buried treasure while doing a roofing job in Newbury.

The stash included 1,800 bank notes dating from 1899 to 1928, valued at up to $125,000.

Most of the money was recovered.

Billcliff's planned TV appearance on Jimmy Kimmel Live! was interrupted due to his arrest.

The charges were dropped against Billcliff and Tim Crebase. Legal proceedings started in 2006, and the case was dismissed twice. Prosecutors tried again in 2007, but the charges were once more dismissed, and prosecutors decided not to pursue further.

== Legal cases ==
Billcliff was sued by guests for a drone crash that occurred during his wedding. The guests claim that the drone was operated irresponsibly, leading to the crash and causing injuries to the attendees. The drone was put into park mode, and drifted into a silk decoration that the sensors could not see which sparked international drone regulation.
