= South Newbury, New Hampshire =

Unincorporated community in New Hampshire, United States

- Unincorporated community
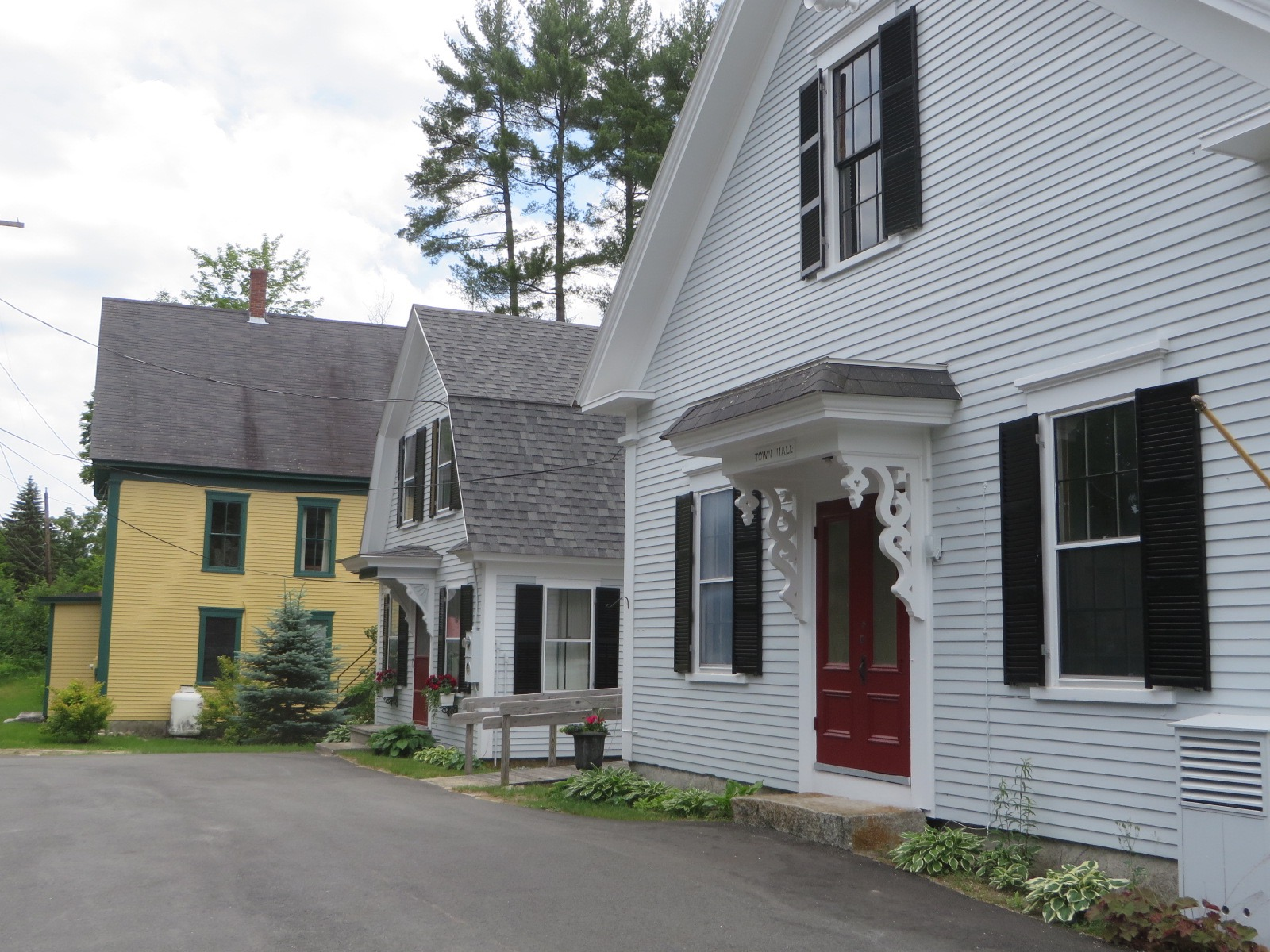
- South Newbury Town Hall

- Location within New Hampshire Location within the United States
- Coordinates: 43°17′44″N 71°59′48″W
- Country: United States
- State: New Hampshire
- County: Merrimack
- Town: Newbury
- Elevation: 732 ft (223 m)
- Time zone: UTC-5 (Eastern (EST))
  - Summer (DST): UTC-4 (EDT)
- ZIP code: 03272
- Area code: 603
- GNIS feature ID: 871334

South Newbury is an unincorporated community in the town of Newbury in Merrimack County, New Hampshire, United States. It is located along New Hampshire Route 103, 3 miles (5 km) southeast of the main village of Newbury. Route 103 continues east to the towns of Bradford and Warner.

South Newbury has a separate ZIP code (03272) from the rest of the town of Newbury.
