= Dan Wolf (New Hampshire politician) =

American politician

Member of the New Hampshire House of Representatives from the Merrimack 5th district
- Incumbent
- Assumed office December 7, 2016
- Preceded by: David H. Kidder

Personal details
- Born: January 1947 (age 79)
- Party: Republican

Daniel Wolf is a New Hampshire politician.

== Early life ==
Wolf earned a Bachelor of Arts degree from Nasson College in Maine.

== Career ==
Wolf previously served as chairman of the Kearsarge Regional School Board. He is the president of Hodan Properties, a real estate service. He serves as chairman of the Newbury Trustee of the Trust Fund.

On November 8, 2016, Wolf was elected to the New Hampshire House of Representatives where he represented the Merrimack 5 district. He assumed office on December 7, 2016, and served until 2024. He is a Republican.

== Personal life ==
Wolf resides in Newbury, New Hampshire. He is married and has two children.
