= The Errand Boy (musical) =

1904 musical

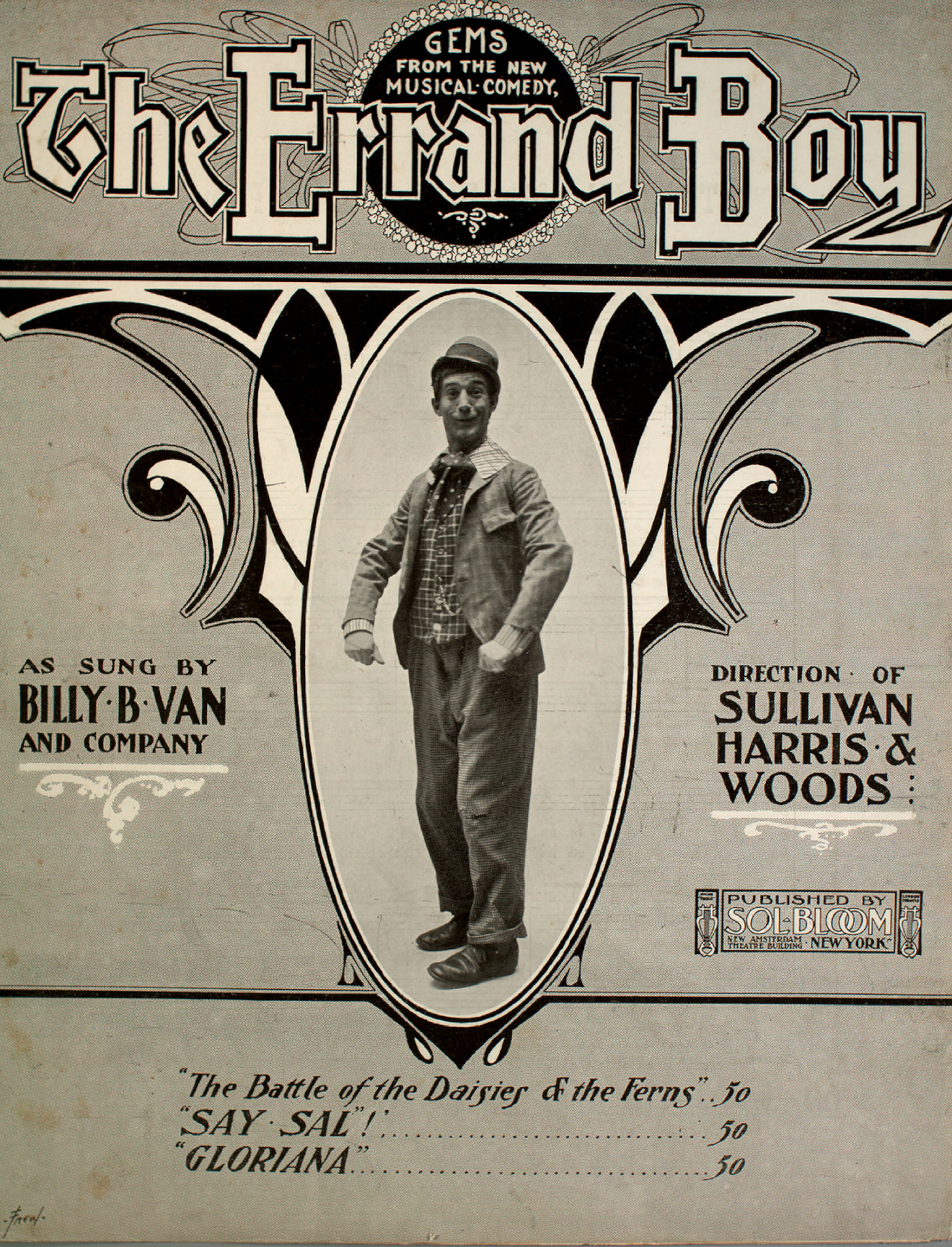
The Errand Boy sheet music cover featuring Billy B. Van

The Errand Boy is a musical in two acts with lyrics by Edward P. Moore (or possibly Edward P. Moran) and a book by George Totten Smith. Created as a starring vehicle for vaudeville star Billy B. Van, the composer of the music for this work was never credited. Set in the town of Georges Mills, New Hampshire, the plot centers around the local errand boy Patsy Bolivar who becomes involved with a troupe of traveling performers stranded in his town.

== History ==
The Errand Boy was a successful "road musical" that traveled throughout the United States from 1904 through 1906. It was created as a starring vehicle for Billy B. Van and was built around the pre-existing character of Patsy Bolivar, the "eternal upstart office boy" which Van had been performing in vaudeville for a decade. Van had portrayed the character already in the 1903 musical The Jersey Lily and would later portray Patsy Bolivar again in another musical, Patsy in Politics, in 1907. In order to visually create the character, Van wore short pants, a loud bright gingham shirt, and a tight red wig.

While some sources have definitively credited Edward P. Moran as the lyricist and George Totten Smith as the author of the book for this musical, other sources have pointed out the ambiguity of any certain authorship for this particular work. A review of the production in Brooklyn Life stated, "No one ever knows just who writes a musical of this sort, so many are the fingers in the pie before and after it sees daylight." Musical theatre scholar Dan Dietz, asserts that while George Totten Smith was likely the original book writer, many changes and alterations were made later by others; making any claim of a single author tenuous. While its clear that Edward P. Moore (or possibly the surname Moran instead of Moore) did contribute original lyrics to some music in the show, it's also certain that other lyricists were involved as well. The musical also included a number of songs created earlier by a variety of known songwriters from earlier successful musicals, such as the song "Patsy Bolivar" from The Jersey Lily by composer Reginald De Koven and lyricist George V. Hobart.

During its lengthy road tour, The Errand Boy was brought to Broadway by producers Sam H. Harris, A. H. Woods, and P. H. Sullivan at the Fourteenth Street Theatre where it had its New York City premiere on October 31, 1904. The production, while reviewed positively by New York critics and received well by New York audiences, only stayed on Broadway for one week before continuing on its tour elsewhere. The production stopped at the Fourteenth Street Theatre again on its tour for another week of performances ten months later, beginning August 28, 1905.

== Bibliography ==
- Dietz, Dan (2022). "The Errand Boy". The Complete Book of 1900s Broadway Musicals. Rowman & Littlefield Publishers. ISBN 9781538168943.
- Bordman, Gerald Martin; Norton, Richard (2010). American Musical Theatre: A Chronicle. Oxford University Press. ISBN 9780199729708.
