= The Fells =

Historic house in New Hampshire, United States

- U.S. National Register of Historic Places
- U.S. Historic district
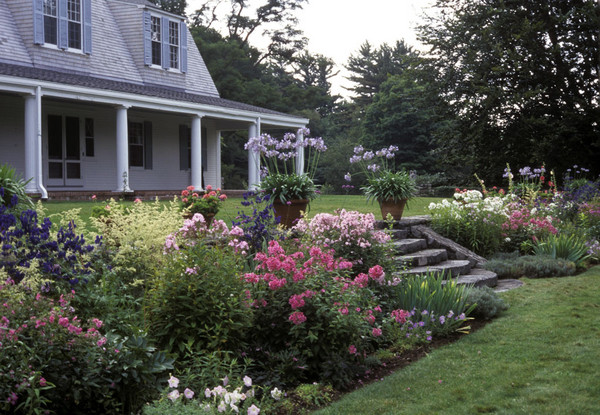
- The Fells (John Hay Estate)
- Location: Newbury, New Hampshire
- Coordinates: 43°21.1′N 72°2.8′W
- Area: 164 acres (66 ha)
- Built: 1891
- Architect: George Hammond (1891) Prentice Sanger (1915)
- Architectural style: Colonial Revival
- NRHP reference No.: 00001288
- Added to NRHP: 2 November 2000

The Fells, also known as the Hay Estate, was originally the summer home of John Milton Hay, a 19th-century American statesman. It is located in Newbury, New Hampshire, on New Hampshire Route 103A, 2.2 mi (3.5 km) north of its junction with New Hampshire Route 103.

== History ==
John Hay served the United States in various capacities in a career that lasted over 40 years. He was Abraham Lincoln's private secretary during the Civil War and later a diplomat and a journalist. He became United States Secretary of State in 1898, serving in that position until his death in 1905.

In the late 1880s New Hampshire farms were becoming less profitable, due to more Western competition. As a result, the state of New Hampshire stepped in and encouraged America's wealthy elite to buy up the farms and keep them afloat. In 1888, Hay bought 1,000 acres (400 ha) along the shore of Lake Sunapee, with the hope of establishing a summer colony for his group of friends, known as the "Five of Hearts". After Henry Adams' wife, Clover, committed suicide, Hay reconsidered those plans. Instead, he used the land as a retreat to put distance between him and the stresses of Washington. Hay named his property "The Fells", a British term for a rocky upland pasture, due to his Scottish ancestry.

=== House ===
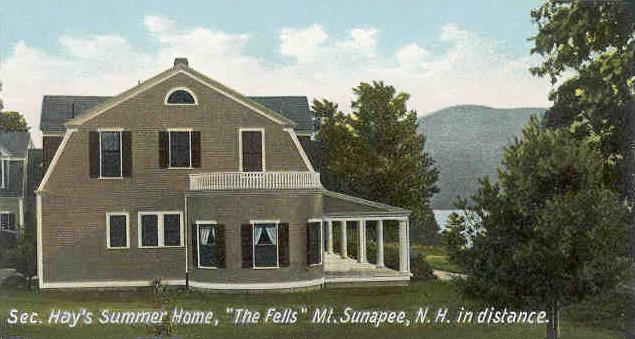
The Fells c.1905

The first cottage on the property was constructed in 1891 under the direction of architect George Hammond. In 1897, a second guest cottage was added beside the original. The main entrance of the primary cottage faced the lake, as the Hay family arrived by boat. After Hay's death in 1905, the property was handed down to his son, Clarence Hay. Clarence and his wife Alice (née: Appleton) began to transform the rustic summer cottages into more of a lakeside mansion. Starting in 1915, under the supervision of local architect Prentice Sanger, Clarence and Alice had the house renovated into the Colonial Revival style. The breezeway connecting the two cottages was transformed into a formal hallway, so that the two cottages became part of one house. A garage was later added to accommodate the growing use of automobiles.

In 1960 the Hays donated 675 acres (273 ha) to the Society for the Protection of New Hampshire Forests. After Clarence Hay died in 1969, Alice Hay gave the remaining 164 acres (66 ha) to the United States Fish and Wildlife Service, reserving 143 acres (58 ha) for use during her lifetime and that of her children. Alice continued returning each summer until her death in 1987. The remaining land then became the John Hay National Wildlife Refuge. Renovation of the house and land began in the 1990s. In 1996, "The Fells", a not-for-profit organization, was created to manage the house and surrounding lands. In 2008, The Fells bought the lands surrounding the main house from the Fish and Wildlife Service, through a land swap at Lake Umbagog in Coös County, New Hampshire.

The property was listed on the National Register of Historic Places as an important early example of the summer estate movement of the late 19th century in New Hampshire, and for its association with Hay, a leading politician and diplomat, at the height of his career. The Fells is where John Hay wrote the Open Door Policy, which rejected colonizing China. Theodore Roosevelt visited The Fells in the summer of 1902, during a campaign trip. A maple tree was planted in what is now the veranda, during his visit. The tree is now referred to as the Roosevelt Tree.

== Today ==
Today, The Fells is maintained by a large group of volunteers, as well as a garden staff and administrators. The house and surrounding lands are still open to the public. The Fells hosts many cultural and educational events.

== John Hay National Wildlife Refuge ==
John Hay National Wildlife Refuge
- IUCN category IV (habitat/species management area)
- Location within the United States
- Location: Merrimack County, New Hampshire, United States
- Nearest city: Newbury, New Hampshire
- Area: 80 acres (0.32 km^{2})
- Established: 1987
- Governing body: U.S. Fish and Wildlife Service
- Website: John Hay National Wildlife Refuge

Established in 1987 for migratory bird conservation, the John Hay National Wildlife Refuge was split in 2008. The northern two-thirds of the property (containing the buildings and surrounding grounds) was transferred to The Fells in that year in exchange for lands in northern New Hampshire which were added to the Umbagog National Wildlife Refuge.

The remaining one-third of the property continues as the John Hay National Wildlife Refuge, comprising 80 acres (32 ha) of hardwoods and softwoods, a small meadow, Beech Brook, fens, and vernal pools. Management is focused on resource conservation, primarily for migratory birds and native habitats. The refuge also protects approximately 3,100 feet (940 m) of undeveloped shoreline along Lake Sunapee.

The refuge is open to the public year-round during daylight hours. Recommended activities include wildlife observation and photography, and environmental education and interpretation. The 0.9-mile (1.4 km) John Hay II Forest Ecology Trail offers a self-guided hike through the forest and along the shore of Lake Sunapee. Parking is at The Fells.

== See also ==
- Cornish Art Colony
- Augustus Saint-Gaudens
- Hildene
- Lake Sunapee
- National Register of Historic Places listings in Merrimack County, New Hampshire
