= Little Sunapee Lake =

Lake in Merrimack County, New Hampshire

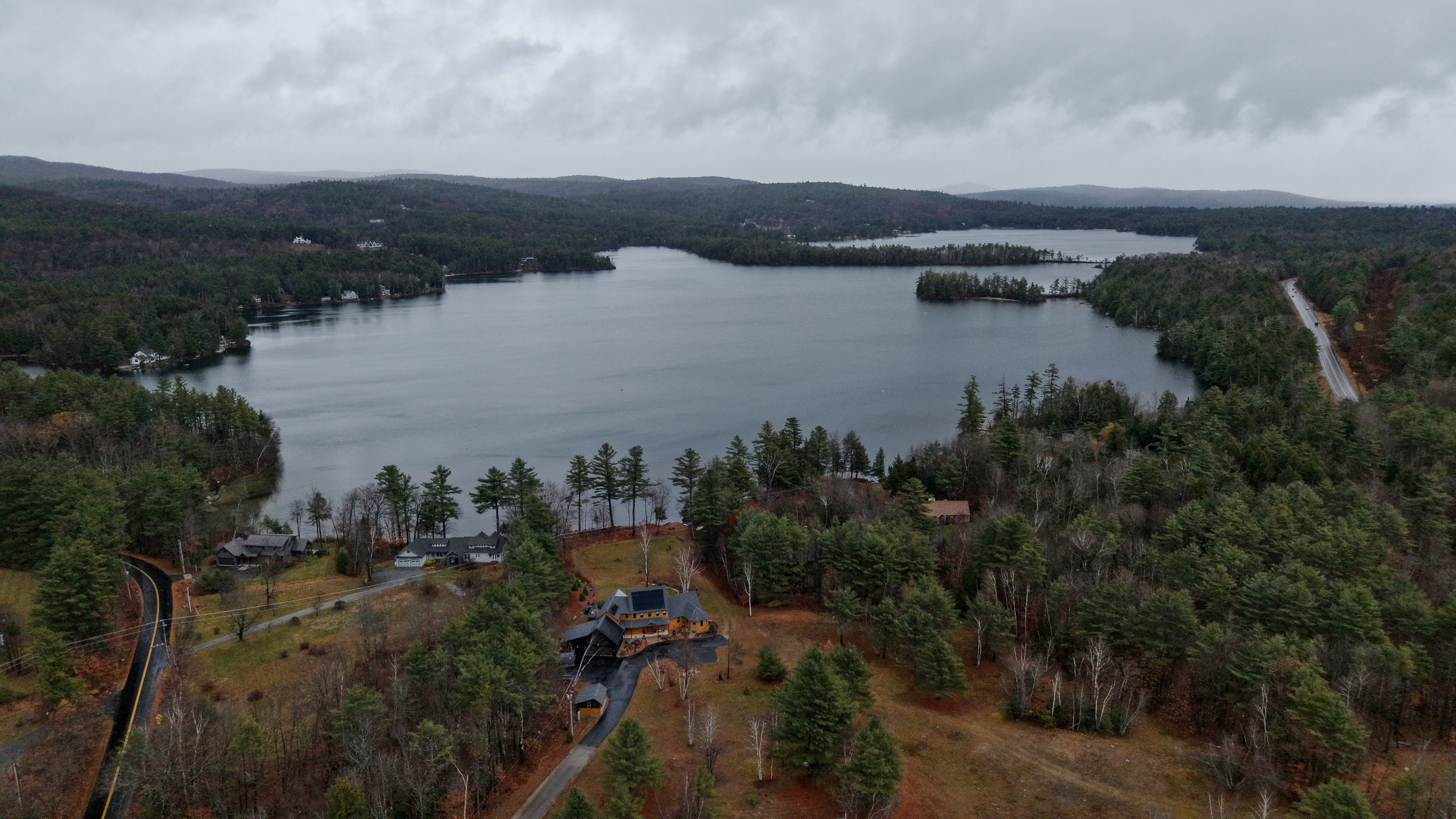
- Little Sunapee Lake, NH, from the west

- Location within New Hampshire Location within the United States
- Location: Merrimack County / Sullivan County, New Hampshire
- Coordinates: 43°26′3″N 72°1′8″W
- Primary inflows: Kidder Brook
- Primary outflows: to Sunapee Lake
- Basin countries: United States
- Max. length: 1.7 mi (2.7 km)
- Max. width: 0.7 mi (1.1 km)
- Surface area: 486 acres (1.97 km^{2})
- Average depth: 14 feet (4.3 m)
- Max. depth: 43 feet (13 m)
- Surface elevation: 1,220 feet (372 m)
- Settlements: New London; Springfield

Little Sunapee Lake (or "Little Lake Sunapee", a frequent local usage) is a 486-acre (197 ha) water body located primarily in Merrimack County in central New Hampshire, United States, in the town of New London. A small portion of the lake crosses into neighboring Springfield in Sullivan County. The lake is sometimes referred to as "Twin Lakes" due to a long, narrow peninsula which nearly cuts the lake in half. Water flowing out of the lake passes through Goose Pond and Otter Pond before entering Lake Sunapee. Bucklin Beach is a Town of New London recreation area at the east end of the lake.

The lake is classified as a warmwater fishery and contains rainbow trout, smallmouth bass, chain pickerel, and horned pout.

== See also ==
- List of lakes in New Hampshire
