= Kearsarge Regional School District =

School district in New Hampshire, United States

Address
- 101 Regional School Road New London, New Hampshire, 03257; United States

District information
- Type: Public
- Grades: K–12
- Schools: 7

Other information
- Website: www.kearsarge.org

Kearsarge Regional School District is a public school district serving several towns in central New Hampshire, United States. The district provides education for students in kindergarten through grade 12 and operates multiple elementary, middle, and high schools. Its administrative offices are located in New London.

== History ==
The Kearsarge Regional School District was established as a cooperative school district to serve multiple towns in the Lake Sunapee region of New Hampshire. The district takes its name from Mount Kearsarge, a prominent geographic feature in the region.

== Member towns ==
The district serves students from the following municipalities:

- Bradford
- Newbury
- New London
- Springfield
- Sutton
- Warner
- Wilmot

== Schools ==
The Kearsarge Regional School District operates the following schools:

=== Elementary schools ===
- Bradford Elementary School
- Newbury Elementary School
- Sutton Central School
- Wilmot Elementary School

=== Middle schools ===
- Kearsarge Regional Middle School

=== High schools ===
- Kearsarge Regional High School

== Administration ==
The district is overseen by a superintendent and governed by an elected school board representing the member towns.

== See also ==
- Education in New Hampshire
- List of school districts in New Hampshire
