= Blodgett Landing, New Hampshire =

Census-designated place in New Hampshire, United States

- Census-designated place
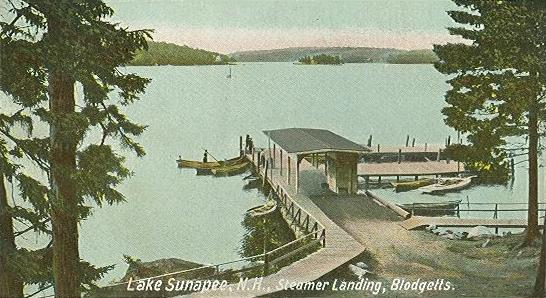
- 1905 postcard

- Location in Merrimack County and the state of New Hampshire.
- Coordinates: 43°22′27″N 72°02′20″W
- Country: United States
- State: New Hampshire
- County: Merrimack
- Town: Newbury

Area
  - Total: 0.29 sq mi (0.75 km^{2})
  - Land: 0.29 sq mi (0.75 km^{2})
  - Water: 0 sq mi (0.00 km^{2})
- Elevation: 1,198 ft (365 m)

Population (2020)
  - Total: 152
  - Density: 522.6/sq mi (201.76/km^{2})
- Time zone: UTC-5 (Eastern (EST))
  - Summer (DST): UTC-4 (EDT)
- ZIP Code: 03255 (Newbury)
- Area code: 603
- FIPS code: 33-06020
- GNIS feature ID: 2629716

Blodgett Landing (frequently spelled Blodgetts Landing or Blodgett's Landing) is a census-designated place in the town of Newbury, New Hampshire, United States. It had a population of 152 at the 2020 census, up from 101 at the 2010 census.

== Geography ==
Blodgett Landing is located in the northern part of Newbury, between New Hampshire Route 103A and the shore of Lake Sunapee. It is bordered to the north by the town of New London.

According to the U.S. Census Bureau, the Blodgett Landing CDP has a total area of 0.29 square miles (0.75 km^{2}), all land.

== Demographics ==
Historical population
Census	Pop.	Note	%±
2010	101		—
2020	152		50.5%
U.S. Decennial Census

As of the census of 2010, there were 101 people, 54 households, and 32 families residing in the CDP. There were 159 housing units, of which 105, or 66.0%, were vacant seasonal or vacation properties. The racial makeup of the CDP was 98.0% white, 1.0% Native American, and 1.0% "some other race". 2.0% of the population were Hispanic or Latino of any race.

Of the 54 households in the CDP, 7.4% had children under the age of 18 living with them, 48.1% were headed by married couples living together, 5.6% had a female householder with no husband present, and 40.7% were non-families. 35.2% of all households were made up of individuals, and 9.3% were someone living alone who was 65 years of age or older. The average household size was 1.87, and the average family size was 2.38.

6.9% of residents in the CDP were under the age of 18, 7.1% were from age 18 to 24, 11.0% were from 25 to 44, 47.5% were from 45 to 64, and 27.7% were 65 years of age or older. The median age was 57.3 years. For every 50 females there were 57.4 males. For every 50 females age 18 and over, there were 56.8 males.
