= Fairfax Downey =

American author (1893–1990

Fairfax Davis Downey (November 28, 1893 – May 31, 1990) was an American writer and military historian. Fairfax Downey graduated from Yale, where he was an editor of campus humor magazine The Yale Record. After college, he served in the U.S. Army as a captain of the 12th Field Artillery in World War I. He was a recipient of the Silver Star for gallantry during the Battle of Belleau Wood. During the Second World War he served in North Africa, retiring as a lieutenant colonel. He worked as a newspaper reporter in Kansas City and New York City and retired to West Springfield, New Hampshire in the 1950s, where his wife's family had summered for a number of years at the family home Adamsfort. At the time of his death, he was married to Washington DC socialite Mildred Adams, daughter of Dr. Samuel S. Adams, and had one daughter and four grandchildren.

He wrote biographies of Richard Harding Davis, Charles Dana Gibson, and Richard Francis Burton. His books on history and military history included Our Lusty Forefathers, (1947), Sound of the Guns (1956), and Storming of the Gateway (1960).

Fairfax Davis Downey, lieutenant colonel, United States Army, is buried in Arlington National Cemetery. Fairfax Downey was the son of General George F. Downey and the grandson of Captain, Brevet Major, George Mason Downey, 14th, 32nd, and 21st Infantry, U.S. Army (1861–1888).

== Bibliography ==
=== History ===
- Downey, Fairfax (1938). Disaster fighters. New York: G. P. Putnam's Sons.
- — (1941). Indian-fighting army. New York: C. Scribner's Sons.
- Downey, Fairfax; Paul Brown (1949). Horses of destiny. New York: C. Scribner's Sons.
- Dogs of Destiny
- Cats of Destiny
- Mascots, illustrated by Augusto Marin, Coward-McCann (1954), hardcover, 150 pages
- Dogs for Defense
- Sound of the Guns; the story of American artillery from the ancient and honorable company to the atom cannon and guided missile, David McKay Company (1956), hardcover
- General Crook, Indian Fighter, The Westminster Press, Philadelphia, (1957), hardcover, 192 pages
- The Guns at Gettysburg
- Clash of the Cavalry: Battle of Brady Station, June 9, 1863
- Famous Horses of the Civil War
- Storming of the Gateway: Chattanooga, 1863, David McKay Co (1960), hardcover
- Indian wars of the U. S. Army, 1776–1865, Doubleday (1963), hardcover, 248 pages
- Louisbourg: Key to a Continent, Prentice-hall, Inc., hardcover
- Cannonade; great artillery actions of history, the famous cannons, and the Master Gunners
- Fife, Drum & Bugle
- Our Lusty Forefathers: Being Diverse Chronicles of the Fervors, Frolics, Fights, Festivities, and Failings of Our American Ancestors, Books for Libraries Press (1947), Ayer Co Pub (1971), hardcover, 359 pages, ISBN 978-0836980936
- The Red/Bluecoats: the Indian Scouts, U.S. Army
- Texas and the War with Mexico, with Paul M. Angle & The Editors of American Heritage, American Heritage Junior Library (June 1961), hardcover, 153 pages, ISBN 978-0060217266
- The Buffalo Soldiers in the Indian Wars, McGraw-Hill (1969), hardcover, 127 pages

=== Biographies ===
- The Grande Turke: Suleyman the Magnificent, Sultan of the Ottomans
- Burton, Arabian Nights Adventurer
- Richard Harding Davis: His Day, Charles Scribner's Sons (1933), hard cover, 321 pages
- Portrait of an Era as Drawn by C.D. Gibson: A Biography, Charles Scribner's Sons (1936)

=== Anthologies ===
- My Kingdom for a Horse: Greatest Horse Stories of All Time, edited by Fairfax Downey, Doubleday (1960), hardcover
- Great dog stories of all time, Doubleday (1962)
- Races to the Swift: Great Stories of the Turf, Doubleday (1967), hardcover

=== Historical novels, juveniles ===
- War Horse
- Dog of War, illustrated by Paul Brown, Dodd, Mead & Co (1943), hardcover, 153 pages
- Jezebel the Jeep
- Army Mule
- Cavalry Mount
- The Seventh's Staghound
- Free and Easy: The Story of a Narragansett Pacer, illustrated by Frederick Chapman, Charles Scribner's Sons (1951), hard cover
- Trail of the Iron Horse
- A Horse for General Lee
- The Shining Filly
- Guns for General Washington

=== Humor and light verse ===
- A Comic History of Yale
- Father's First Two Years
- When We Were Rather Older, illustrated by Jefferson Machamer, Minton, Balch & Co, NY (1926), hard cover
- Young Enough to Know Better
- Laughing Verse, collected by Fairfax Downey, Thomas Y. Crowell Company, New York (1946) hardcover, 86 pages

=== Miscellaneous ===
- It Happened in New Hampshire
- Contribution, Reunion in Print, Yale, 1916, Twenty-Five Year Book
- Editor, Julia Marlowe's Story

=== Essays, reporting and other contributions ===
- Downey, Fairfax (February 21, 1925). "'Opening his case Cyril selected a cigaret'". The New Yorker. Vol. 1, no. 1. p. 31.
- F. D. (February 28, 1925). "Similes of New York, N.Y.". The New Yorker. Vol. 1, no. 2. p. 17.
- Downey, Fairfax (March 28, 1925). "The hunt : an episode in the motorized millenium". The New Yorker. Vol. 1, no. 6. p. 27.
- F. D. (April 18, 1925). "Local observations". The New Yorker. Vol. 1, no. 9. p. 27.
- Downey, Fairfax (January 1939). "'Sharp cracks of a rifle'". The American Legion Magazine. 26 (1).
