= Gile State Forest =

State Forest in Sullivan County, New Hampshire

- Interactive map of Gile State Forest
- Type: State forest
- Location: Springfield, Sullivan County, New Hampshire
- Coordinates: 43.493°N 71.992°W
- Area: 6,675 acres (27.01 km^{2})
- Operator: New Hampshire Division of Forests and Lands

Gile State Forest is a state forest of New Hampshire located mostly in Springfield. The forest covers 6,675 acres (27.01 km^{2}) and is bisected by New Hampshire Route 4A. It includes Gardner Memorial Wayside Park at the portion of the forest's edge that extends into Wilmot, which features a memorial to Walter C. Gardner II, whose father established Gile State Forest.

An easy half-mile trail leads from Gardner Memorial Wayside Park to scenic Butterfield Pond.
