= Gardner Memorial Wayside Park =

Public space in Wilmot, New Hampshire, United States

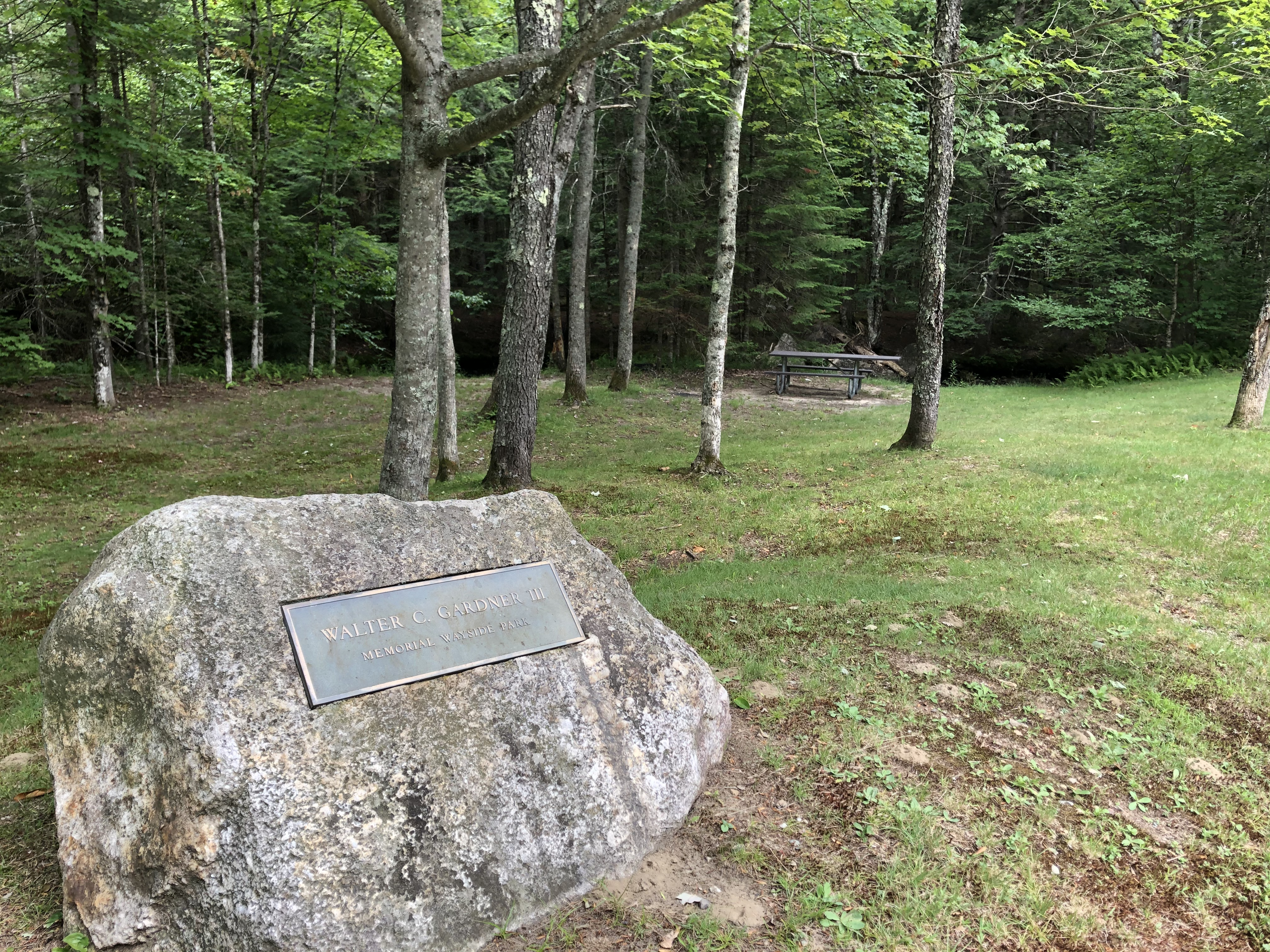
- Park memorial to Walter C. Gardner II

- Location within New Hampshire
- Interactive map of Gardner Memorial Wayside Park
- Location: Wilmot, New Hampshire, United States
- Coordinates: 43°29′00″N 71°58′31″W
- Established: 1980
- Administrator: New Hampshire Division of Parks and Recreation
- Website: Official website
- New Hampshire State Parks

Gardner Memorial Wayside Park is a small public recreation area located on Route 4A in Wilmot, New Hampshire. It is part of 6,675-acre (2,701 ha) Gile State Forest. The park offers picnicking, a half-mile hiking trail to scenic Butterfield Pond, and fishing on a brook where a mill stood in the 1800s. A park memorial is dedicated to Walter C. Gardner II, whose father established Gile State Forest.
