= Sunapee, New Hampshire =

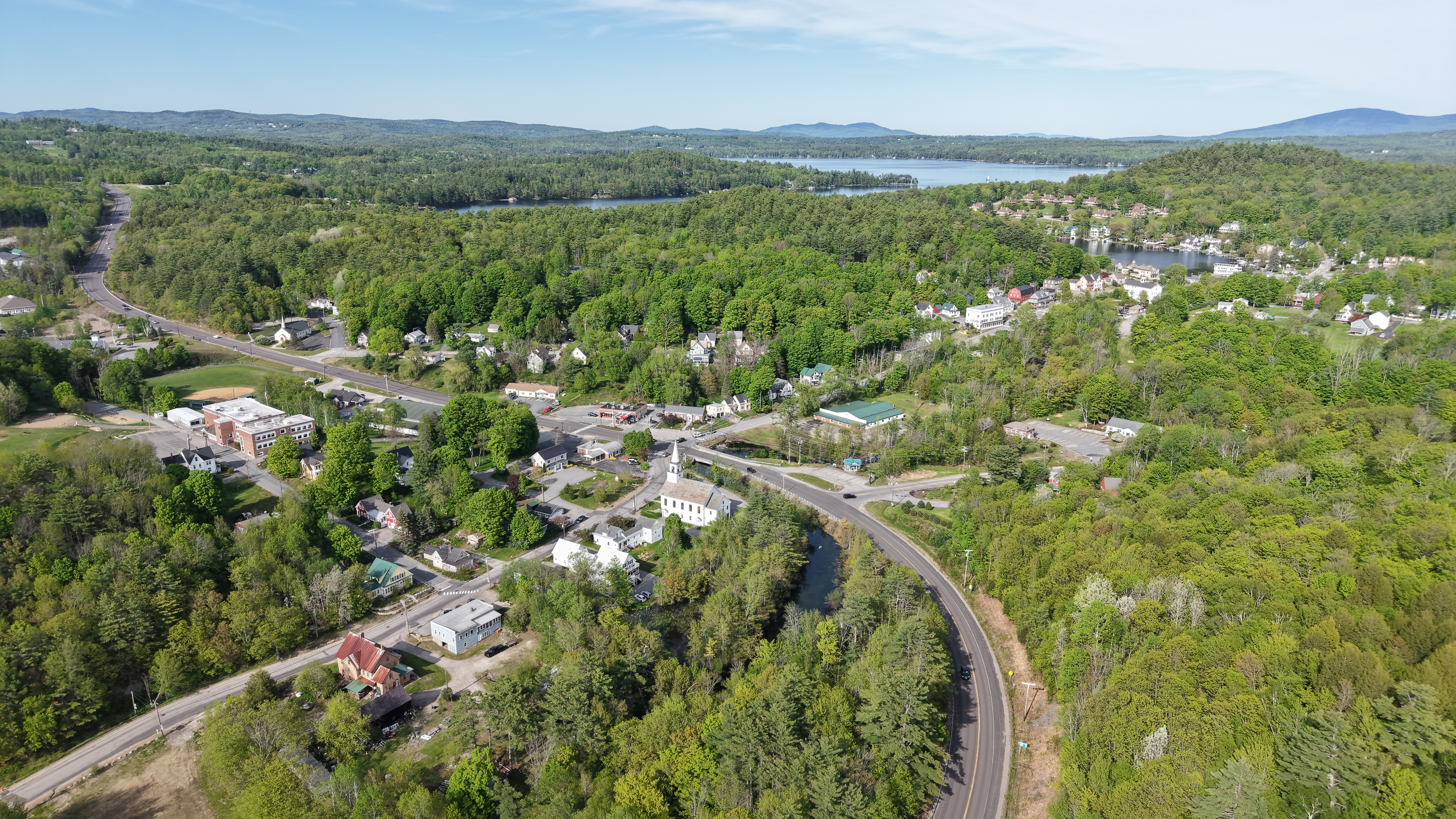
- Sunapee, New Hampshire, from the west

- Seal

- Location in Sullivan County and the state of New Hampshire
- Coordinates: 43°23′29″N 72°05′25″W
- Country: United States
- State: New Hampshire
- County: Sullivan
- Incorporated: 1781
- Villages: Sunapee; Burkehaven; Fernwood; Georges Mills; Granliden; Wendell

Area
  - Total: 25.15 sq mi (65.15 km^{2})
  - Land: 21.05 sq mi (54.53 km^{2})
  - Water: 4.10 sq mi (10.63 km^{2}) 16.31%
- Elevation: 1,125 ft (343 m)

Population (2020)
  - Total: 3,342
  - Density: 159/sq mi (61.3/km^{2})
- Time zone: UTC-5 (Eastern)
  - Summer (DST): UTC-4 (Eastern)
- ZIP codes: 03782 (Sunapee); 03751 (Georges Mills)
- Area code: 603
- FIPS code: 33-75060
- GNIS feature ID: 873732
- Website: www.sunapeenh.gov

Sunapee is a town in Sullivan County, New Hampshire, United States. The population was 3,342 at the 2020 census. The town is home to part of Lake Sunapee and includes the village of Georges Mills.

== History ==
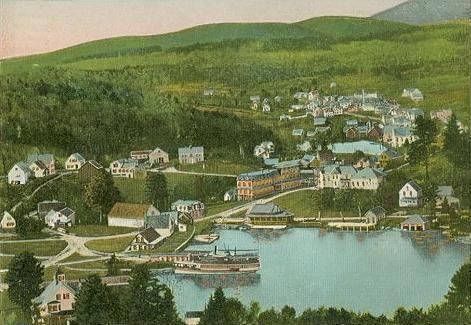
Sunapee Village in 1909

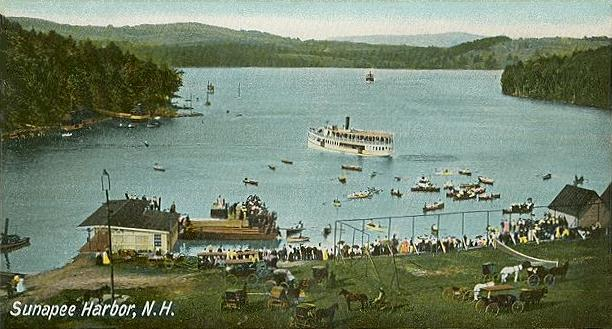
Sunapee Harbor c. 1905

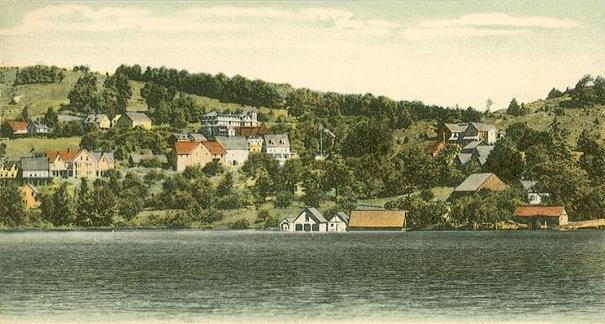
George's Mills c. 1905

Like many other towns, Sunapee went through name changes before its incorporation in 1781, including "Saville" in 1768, "Corey's Town", and then "Wendell", after John Wendell, a Masonian Proprietor. A village at the western edge of town and a marsh near Sunapee Middle-High School still bear Wendell's name. The name "Sunapee" was substituted for "Wendell" by the legislature in 1850. The town, Lake Sunapee and Mount Sunapee share the name which comes from the Algonquian words suna meaning "goose", and apee, meaning "water". The Natives called the area "Lake of the Wild Goose" because it is shaped like a goose, with the beak being in Sunapee Harbor.

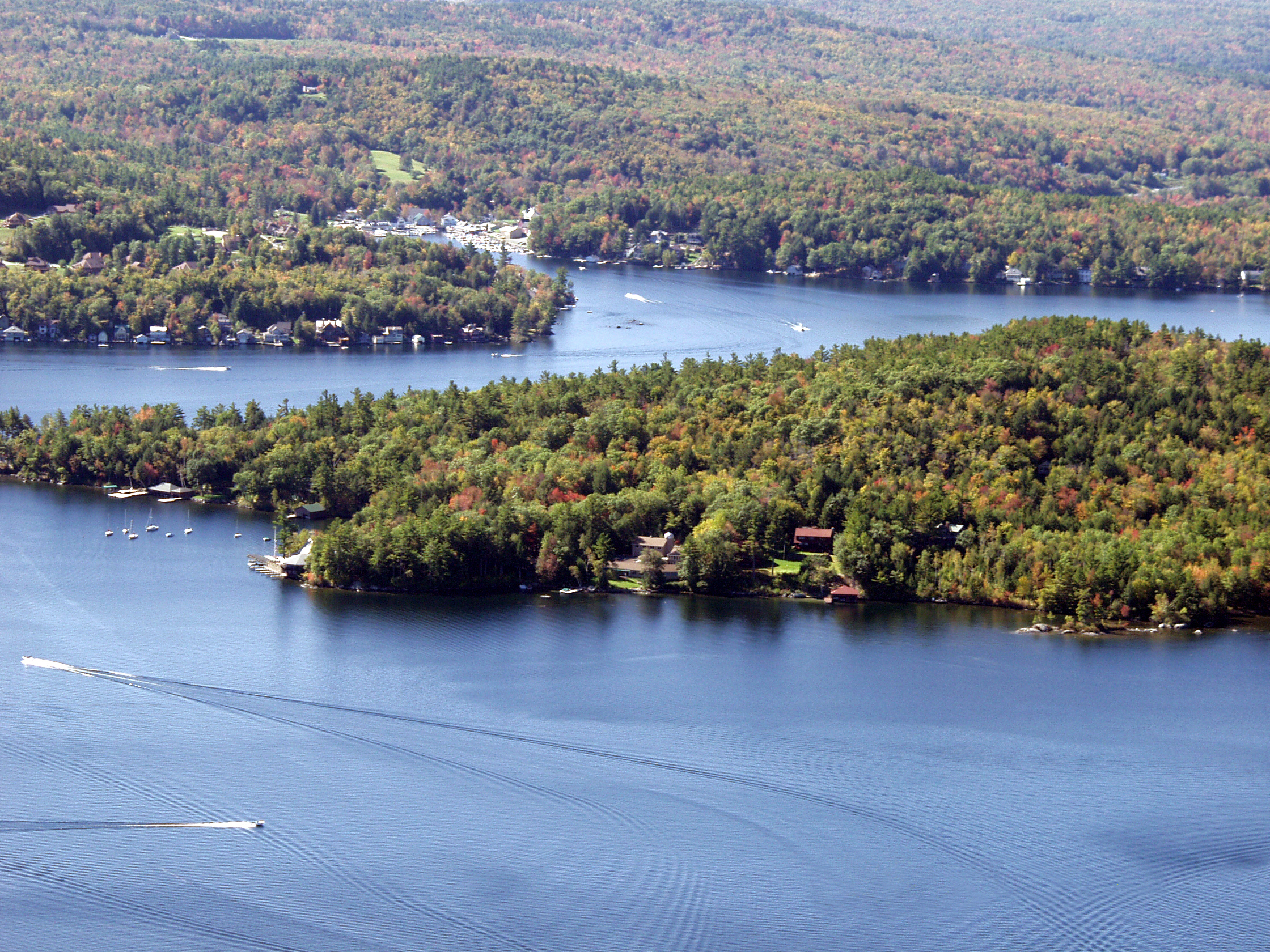
Sunapee, 2005

Before Sunapee was a sizable tourist attraction, it was an industrial area. One factory produced 110 clothespins a minute. After the factories faded away, the major attraction became the pristine lake, once surrounded by a number of grand hotels. People used large ferries to get from hotel to hotel around the lake, but the ferries were mostly gone by 1915, when the automobile was widely introduced to the area. Lake Sunapee is the only lake in New Hampshire with three working lighthouses, which were originally built in the 1890s by the Woodsum brothers and are currently maintained by the Lake Sunapee Protective Association.

== Geography ==
According to the United States Census Bureau, the town has a total area of 25.2 square miles (65.2 km^{2}), of which 21.0 square miles (54.5 km^{2}) are land and 4.1 square miles (10.6 km^{2}) are water, comprising 16.31% of the town. Sunapee is drained by the Sugar River, the outlet of Lake Sunapee and a west-flowing tributary of the Connecticut River. The highest point in town is about 1,600 feet (490 m) above sea level, along the town's northern border, just north of Ledge Pond.

=== Adjacent municipalities ===
- Springfield (north)
- New London (northeast)
- Newbury (southeast)
- Goshen (south)
- Newport (southwest)
- Croydon (northwest)

== Demographics ==
Historical population
Census	Pop.	Note	%±
1790	267		—
1800	355		33.0%
1810	447		25.9%
1820	603		34.9%
1830	637		5.6%
1840	795		24.8%
1850	787		−1.0%
1860	778		−1.1%
1870	808		3.9%
1880	895		10.8%
1890	900		0.6%
1900	946		5.1%
1910	1,071		13.2%
1920	898		−16.2%
1930	1,040		15.8%
1940	1,071		3.0%
1950	1,108		3.5%
1960	1,164		5.1%
1970	1,384		18.9%
1980	2,312		67.1%
1990	2,559		10.7%
2000	3,055		19.4%
2010	3,365		10.1%
2020	3,342		−0.7%
U.S. Decennial Census

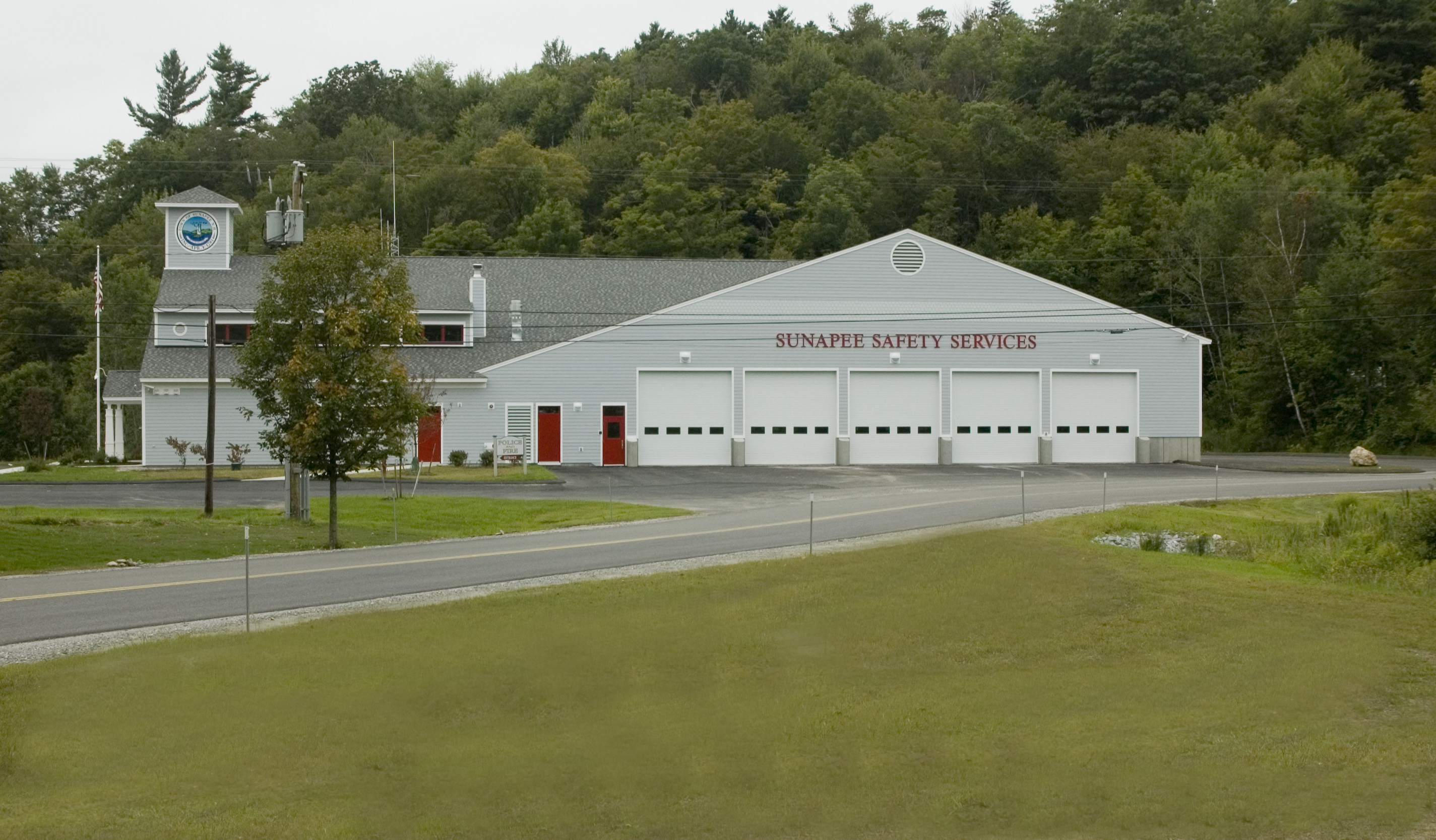
Safety Services facility, completed August 2006

As of the census of 2010, there were 3,365 people, 1,443 households, and 973 families residing in the town. The population density was 159.5 inhabitants per square mile (61.6/km^{2}). There were 2,431 housing units at an average density of 115.2 per square mile (44.5/km^{2}). The racial makeup of the town was 97.6% White, 0.2% African American, 0.3% Native American, 0.6% Asian, 0.03% Pacific Islander, 0.3% some other race, and 1.0% from two or more races. Hispanic or Latino of any race were 0.8% of the population.

There were 1,443 households, out of which 27.1% had children under the age of 18 living with them, 55.2% were headed by married couples living together, 7.9% had a female householder with no husband present, and 32.6% were non-families. 25.5% of all households were made up of individuals, and 8.8% were someone living alone who was 65 years of age or older. The average household size was 2.31, and the average family size was 2.74.

In the town, the population was spread out, with 19.6% under the age of 18, 6.7% from 18 to 24, 21.7% from 25 to 44, 32.8% from 45 to 64, and 19.1% who were 65 years of age or older. The median age was 46.2 years. For every 100 females, there were 98.1 males. For every 100 females age 18 and over, there were 96.9 males.

For the period 2007–2011, the estimated median annual income for a household in the town was $66,741, and the median income for a family was $78,973. Male full-time workers had a median income of $52,870 versus $42,784 for females. The per capita income for the town was $38,737. About 0.8% of families and 6.0% of the population were below the poverty line, including 5.7% of those under age 18 and 2.3% of those age 65 or over.

== Notable people ==
- John H. Bartlett (1869–1952), 57th governor of New Hampshire
- Ken Burns (born 1953), director and producer of documentary films
- Steven Tyler (born 1948), lead singer of American rock band Aerosmith
