= Springfield, New Hampshire =

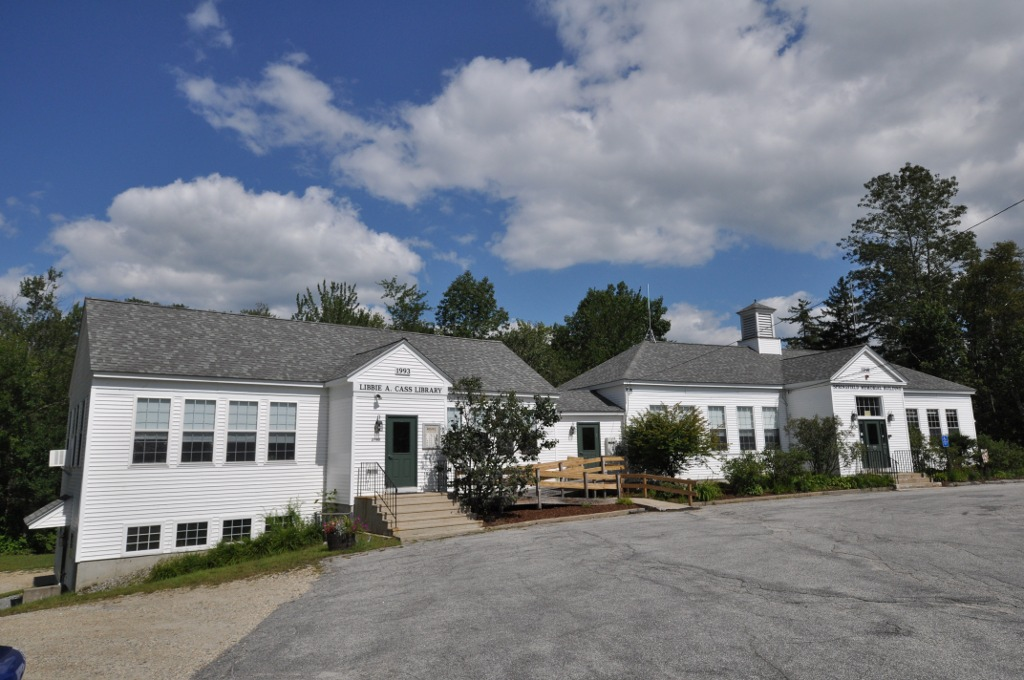
- Town offices and library (2013)

- Seal

- Location in Sullivan County and the state of New Hampshire.
- Coordinates: 43°29′34″N 72°02′12″W
- Country: United States
- State: New Hampshire
- County: Sullivan
- Incorporated: 1794
- Villages: Springfield; West Springfield

Area
  - Total: 44.5 sq mi (115.3 km^{2})
  - Land: 43.6 sq mi (113.0 km^{2})
  - Water: 0.89 sq mi (2.3 km^{2}) 1.99%
- Elevation: 1,404 ft (428 m)

Population (2020)
  - Total: 1,259
  - Density: 29/sq mi (11.1/km^{2})
- Time zone: UTC-5 (Eastern)
  - Summer (DST): UTC-4 (Eastern)
- ZIP codes: 03284 (Springfield); 03748 (Enfield); 03751 (Georges Mills); 03257 (New London)
- Area code: 603
- FIPS code: 33-72740
- GNIS feature ID: 873723
- Website: springfieldnh.org

Springfield is a town in Sullivan County, New Hampshire, United States. The population was 1,259 at the 2020 census. Gile State Forest is located within the town.

== History ==
First settled by Europeans in 1769 and named "Protectworth", the town adopted the name "Springfield" when it was incorporated in 1794. Prior to county division in 1827, Springfield was in Cheshire County.

== Geography ==
Springfield has a total area of 44.5 mi^{2} (115.3 km^{2}), 1.99% of it being water. It has an elevation of 1,404 ft (438 m), with the highest point being the summit of Melvin Hill in the northeast part of town, at 2,312 feet (705 m) above sea level.

=== Adjacent municipalities ===
- Grafton (northeast)
- Wilmot (southeast)
- New London (southeast)
- Sunapee (south)
- Croydon (southwest)
- Grantham (west)

== Demographics ==
Historical population
Census	Pop.	Note	%±
1790	210		—
1800	570		171.4%
1810	614		7.7%
1820	967		57.5%
1830	1,202		24.3%
1840	1,252		4.2%
1850	1,270		1.4%
1860	1,021		−19.6%
1870	781		−23.5%
1880	732		−6.3%
1890	540		−26.2%
1900	439		−18.7%
1910	422		−3.9%
1920	349		−17.3%
1930	270		−22.6%
1940	364		34.8%
1950	324		−11.0%
1960	283		−12.7%
1970	310		9.5%
1980	532		71.6%
1990	788		48.1%
2000	945		19.9%
2010	1,311		38.7%
2020	1,259		−4.0%
U.S. Decennial Census

At the 2000 census there were 945 people, 386 households, and 286 families in the town. The population density was 21.8 people per square mile (8.4/km^{2}). There were 534 housing units at an average density of 12.3 per square mile (4.8/km^{2}). The racial makeup of the town was 98.84% White, 0.32% Native American, 0.21% Asian, 0.21% from other races, and 0.42% from two or more races. Hispanic or Latino of any race were 0.74%.

Of the 386 households, 30.1% had children under the age of 18 living with them, 65.3% were married couples living together, 6.2% had a female householder with no husband present, and 25.9% were non-families. 19.9% of households were one person and 6.7% were one person aged 65 or older. The average household size was 2.45 and the average family size was 2.80.

The age distribution was 23.5% under the age of 18, 4.2% from 18 to 24, 31.1% from 25 to 44, 28.8% from 45 to 64, and 12.4% 65 or older. The median age was 40 years. For every 100 females, there were 97.3 males. For every 100 females age 18 and over, there were 96.5 males.

The median household income was $44,659 and the median family income was $58,068. Males had a median income of $33,958 versus $25,223 for females. The per capita income for the town was $23,263. About 3.5% of families and 5.1% of the population were below the poverty line, including 2.4% of those under age 18 and 7.9% of those age 65 or over.

== Infrastructure ==
=== Internet ===
The town is served by the provider Consolidated Communications. They provide options for both Fiber-optic and DSL, the latter being phased out in preference for the former. The new plans for fiber range in speeds from 50 megabit to 1 gigabit, and while DSL is still available, it is much slower and less reliable (although slightly cheaper) than the fiber options.

In the part of Springfield that is in the community of Eastman, there is also the internet provider Comcast which provides a high of about 300 Mbit/s down and 15 Mbit/s up.

== Notable people ==
- Fairfax Downey (1893–1990), author
- William Allen Knowlton (1920–2008), US Army general, father-in-law of David Petraeus
- David Petraeus (born 1952), US Army general, former director of the Central Intelligence Agency
- Jeriah Swetland (1817–1906), Ohio state representative (1867–1869)
