= Lake Sunapee =

Lake in New Hampshire, United States

- A view between Great Island and Little Island

- Location within New Hampshire Location within the United States
- Location: Sullivan County and Merrimack County, New Hampshire
- Coordinates: 43°22′33″N 72°3′23″W
- Primary inflows: outlet of Little Sunapee Lake; Pike Brook; Blodgett Brook; Bartlett Brook; Chandler Brook
- Primary outflows: Sugar River
- Basin countries: United States
- Max. length: 8.1 miles (13.0 km)
- Max. width: 2.3 miles (3.7 km)
- Surface area: 4,136 acres (17 km^{2})
- Max. depth: 105 feet (32 m)
- Shore length^{1}: 70 miles (110 km)
- Surface elevation: 1,093 feet (333 m)
- Islands: 8
- Settlements: Sunapee; New London; Newbury
- ^{1} Shore length is not a well-defined measure.

Lake Sunapee is located within Sullivan County and Merrimack County in western New Hampshire, United States. It is the fifth-largest lake located entirely in New Hampshire.

The lake is approximately 8.1 miles (13.0 km) long (north-south) and from 0.5 to 2.5 miles (0.8 to 4.0 km) wide (east-west), covering 6.5 square miles (17 km^{2}), with a maximum depth of 105 feet (32 m). It contains eleven islands (Loon Island, Elizabeth Island, Twin Islands, Great Island, Minute Island, Little Island, Star Island, Emerald Island, Isle of Pines, and Penny Island) and is indented by several peninsulas and lake fingers, a combination which yields a total shoreline of some 70 miles (110 km). There are seven sandy beach areas including Mount Sunapee State Park beach; some with restricted town access. There are six boat ramps to access the lake at Sunapee Harbor, Georges Mills, Newbury, Mount Sunapee State Park, Burkehaven Marina, and a private marina. The lake contains three lighthouses on the National Register of Historic Places. The driving distance around the lake is 25 miles (40 km) with many miles of lake water view. The lake is 1,093 feet (333 m) above sea level.

The lake's outlet is in Sunapee Harbor, the headway for the Sugar River, which flows west through Newport and Claremont to the Connecticut River and then to the Atlantic Ocean. The lake discharges about 250 cubic feet per second (on average), and the Sugar River drops approximately 800 feet (240 m) on its 27-mile (43 km) journey to the Connecticut River.

== History ==
Lake Sunapee is a glacial lake. The glaciers deposited large rocks scattered everywhere in the woods when the ice melted about 11,000 years ago. These rocks are called glacial erratics. An example of a large glacial erratic can be found sitting on Minute Island in front of the John Hay Wildlife Refuge accessible along the wildlife shoreline trail.

Native Americans, likely Algonquins, called the lake Soo-Nipi or "Wild Goose Waters" for the many geese that passed over the lake during migration. From an aerial view, and at times from Mount Sunapee, Lake Sunapee also resembles a goose in flight, with the bird's head as the harbor area.

Some local residents can trace their ancestry back to the Native American Penacooks, who hunted geese in the autumn and fished for speckled trout using nets, weirs and spears.

=== The steamboat era ===
Following the extension of the B&M Railroad into Newbury, Lake Sunapee became a popular vacation area long before the introduction of the automobile. The main rail station was at Newbury Harbor, the southernmost point of the lake. Today, the village contains a colorful antique caboose commemorating the railroad line that passed by, bringing vacationers from other parts of the country.

Steamboat service developed on the lake to accommodate the new populace. Steamships ferried passengers from the south end of the lake to cottages and large resort hotels around the lake. Bay Point, Blodgett Landing, and Indian Cave, later known as Lake Avenue, were the most populated piers. One of the first commercial boats was actually propelled by horses in 1854.

The MV Kearsarge on Lake Sunapee with Herrick Cove Lighthouse at a distance

N.S. Gardner purchased Little Island for $1 and put a bowling alley on it. He then launched the Penacook (later renamed Mountain Maid) steamer to carry passengers to Little Island, and so the steamboat era began. The Woodsum brothers launched the Lady Woodsum in 1876. It was 50 feet (15 m) long and could carry 75 passengers. The 90-foot (27 m) Edmund Burke was launched in 1885, carrying 600 passengers. In 1887, the Amenia White was launched; it was 101 feet (31 m) long and carried 650. It was the flagship of the Woodsum fleet and the biggest steamer ever to sail Lake Sunapee.

In 1897 the 70-foot (21 m) steamship Kearsarge was launched carrying 250 passengers. In 1902 the 50-foot (15 m) Weetamoo was launched and was later scuttled near Newbury. The ship is still intact and is visited frequently by local scuba clubs. The pilothouse of the Kearsarge was salvaged from the lake in the 1960s and is on display at the Sunapee Historical Center.

The 52-foot (16 m) MV Mount Sunapee II was launched in 1965 and takes passengers on lake cruises in summer months. The original Mount Sunapee was named Susie Q and had been a rum runner in Damariscotta, Maine.

The 65-foot (20 m) MV Kearsarge, named for the original steamship Kearsarge, was built and launched on Lake Sunapee in 1970 as the Sunapee Belle, a replica of a Mississippi River boat, and operated as a dinner boat. In 1974, the original Sunapee Belle wooden hull was replaced with a steel hull. The hull was cut in half and lengthened to 65 feet in 1980, and the MV Kearsarge restaurant ship was built on top of the new hull.

There were major steamer landings at Sunapee Harbor, Georges Mills, Lakeside Landing, Hastings Landing, Auburn Landing, Blodgett Landing, Brightwood, Pine Cliff, Lake Station, Soo-Nipi, Burkehaven, and Granliden to serve the grand hotels. The automobile led to the demise of the steamer era.

== Cities and towns ==
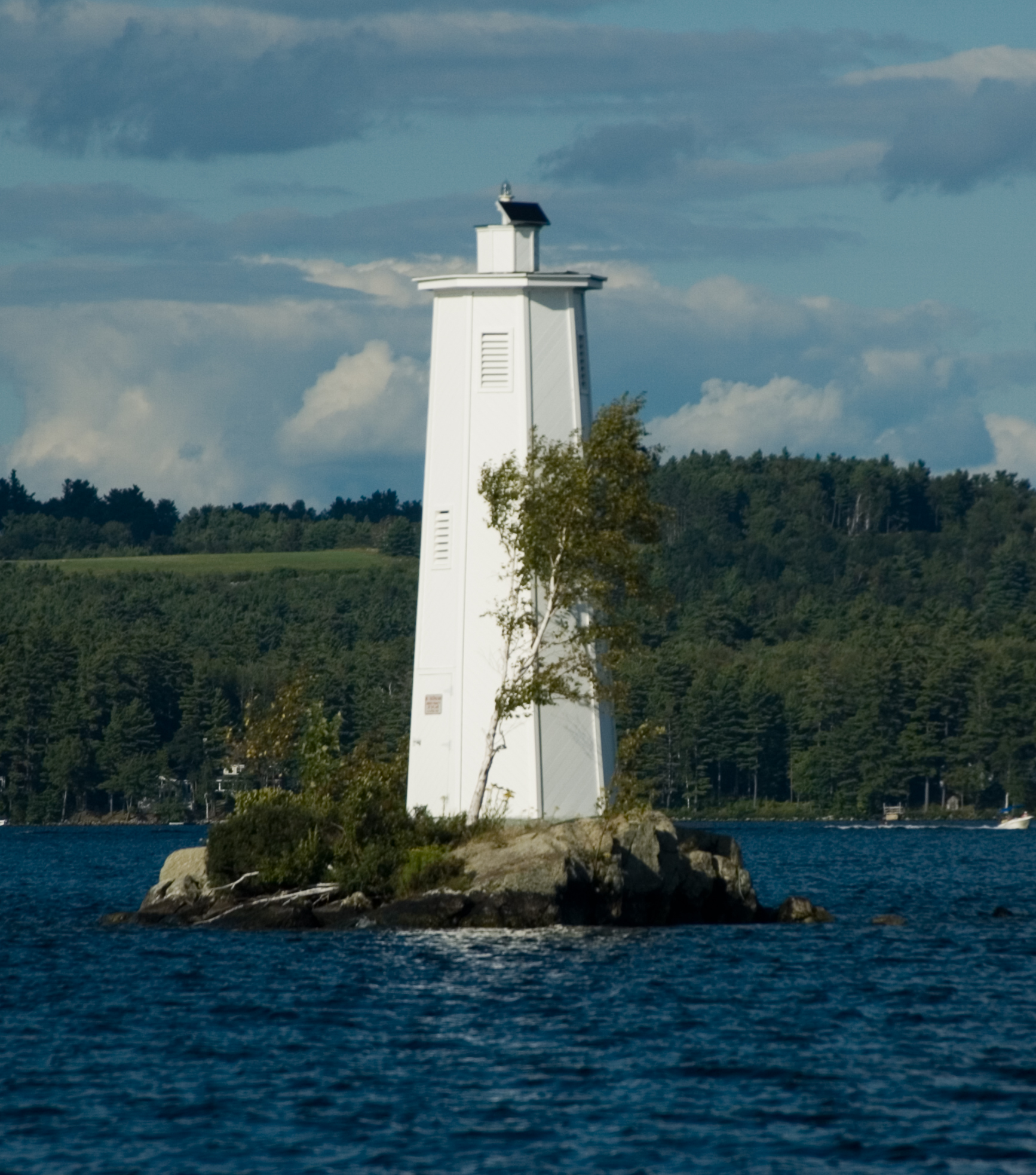
The Loon Lighthouse, one of three lighthouses on Lake Sunapee

The lake is surrounded by three towns. Sunapee lies to the west, incorporating the villages of Sunapee Harbor and Georges Mills, while Newbury lies to the southeast and southwest, and New London is to the east.

== Facts about Lake Sunapee ==
=== Depth ===
At its deepest, Lake Sunapee is about 105 to 144 feet (32 to 44 m) deep at a point called "Hedgehog". Historical maps indicate a depth of 142 feet (43 m), but no recent soundings have exceeded 108 feet (33 m).

=== Water quality ===
The water is exceptionally pure. The water is captured frequently by the LSPA (Lake Sunapee Protective Association) and analyzed at the Colby–Sawyer College aquatic laboratory. The source of much of the water comes from cold underground springs rising from a bedrock aquifer. On a sunny day, objects can be seen to a depth of 30 feet (9.1 m). The lake has a generally rocky base and is currently milfoil-free, except for a 20-square-foot (2 m^{2}) quarantined area.

=== Rainfall ===
One inch of rainfall on the lake produces 116 million US gallons (440,000 m^{3}) of water. One inch in the 28,800-acre (117 km^{2}) watershed potentially produces nearly 900 million US gallons (3,400,000 m^{3}) of water in Lake Sunapee.

=== Ice Out ===
Records have been kept since 1869. The official "Ice Out" report was given by Artie Osborne until his death in 2010; now his son Richard Osborne carries that duty. Ice Out usually occurs in April each year. Occasionally Ice Out occurs in March or May, including:

Taken at Sunapee Town Office September 20, 2011

- May 10, 1869
- May 10, 1870
- May 3, 1872
- May 6, 1873
- May 9, 1972
- May 12, 1975
- May 11, 1876
- May 12, 1879
- May 6, 1881
- May 7, 1883
- May 7, 1887
- May 14, 1888 (latest ice-out date)
- May 13, 1893
- May 3, 1899
- March 22, 2012 (previous earliest record)
- March 18, 2016 (record for earliest ice-out, first time to ever occur prior to the vernal equinox)

A complete list of Ice Out dates from 1869 to 2022 is accessible from the Town of Sunapee website.

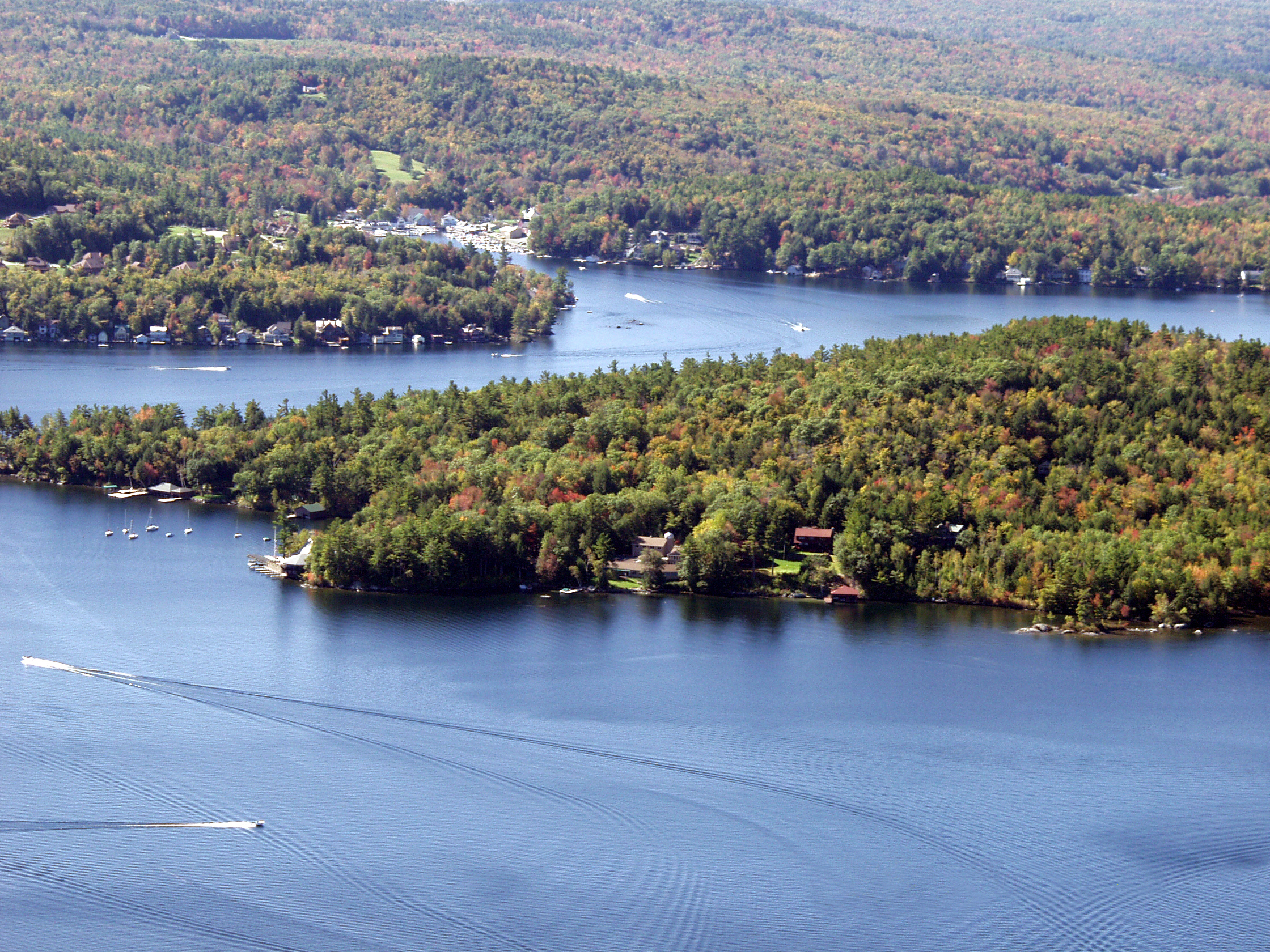
Looking westward at Gardiner Bay, with entrance to Sunapee Harbor, upper left, and Burkehaven Hill; shows about 5% of Lake Sunapee water surface

=== Golden trout and Sunapee trout ===
Salvelinus aureolus oquassa (Bean 1887). Common names: blueback trout, Sunapee trout. Other names: blueback char, golden trout, white trout.

The Sunapee Historical Society published a report in 1968 about Sunapee's golden trout which had a dull silver color like the females most of the year. The golden trout were really white trout, but in the fall, their nuptial season, the males turned a flaming color, giving them the name aureolus (golden halo). The golden trout had a forked tail rather than the square tail of the brook trout.

On January 15, 1921, the Lake Sunapee Fish and Game Club was founded. Rearing tanks were built at Georges Mills in 1922, and 50,000 land-locked salmon, 12,000 chinook salmon, 10,000 silver trout, and 2,000 brook trout, all fingerlings, were reared and planted. By 1940, when the fishery was closed, it had planted 347,403 landlocked and chinook salmon, 196,040 trout, 345,000 mixed trout and salmon, and more than 70 million smelt eggs.

With the introduction of lake trout into Sunapee, which was believed to be an error, the golden trout were bred out of existence.

=== Other fish ===
Lake trout (which bred out the golden trout); landlocked salmon (Atlantic salmon) requiring deep, pure cold water; smallmouth bass; chain pickerel; yellow perch; brown bullhead catfish (commonly called "hornpout"); rock bass (red-eye bass)—predatory, introduced accidentally into the lake, population controlled with children's fishing contests; rainbow smelt; burbot (ling cod).

=== Animals of the watershed ===
It is not uncommon to spot a moose swimming across the lake in the morning; black bear; red foxes; whitetail deer; porcupines; woodchucks; eastern cottontail rabbits; eastern chipmunks; gray squirrels, red squirrels; northern flying squirrels; raccoons; beavers; muskrats; mink; river otters; long-tailed weasels; American martens; and fishers.

== Notable residents ==
- Peter A. Diamond, Nobel laureate, Professor of Economics MIT (ret.), and Federal Reserve Board nominee
- John Hay, private secretary to President Abraham Lincoln and Secretary of State under Presidents William McKinley and Theodore Roosevelt. Hay's lakeshore estate (called The Fells) is located within the John Hay National Wildlife Refuge and is open for tours.
- Nobel laureate Robert Coleman Richardson
- Steven Tyler of the band Aerosmith
- Ken Burns, American filmmaker, known for his style of using archival footage and photographs in documentary films

== Lake Sunapee watershed ==
New Hampshire is divided into five large river basins. The Lake Sunapee watershed is part of the Connecticut River Basin. The watershed is surrounded by high hills and 55 square miles (142 km^{2}) of town lands including parts of Sunapee, Newbury, Sutton, New London, Springfield and Goshen. There are 35 streams or tributaries that empty into Sunapee. The land/water ratio is 7:1. A watershed is an ecosystem of animals, plants, micro-organisms and people who all affect the physical and chemical environment.

=== Lakes in the Sunapee watershed region ===
A large number of lakes lie in the watershed that contributes to Lake Sunapee. Directly upstream from Georges Mills at the north end of the lake is Otter Pond (1,125 ft or 343 m elevation), which in turn is fed by Little Sunapee Lake. Otter Pond is about 32 feet (10 m) higher than Lake Sunapee, and Little Sunapee (1,220 ft or 370 m) is about 127 feet (39 m) higher. Other lakes in the watershed include Baptist Pond, Star Lake, Morgan Pond, Dutchman Pond, Goose Hole, Mountainview Lake (1,116 ft or 340 m), and Chalk Pond, as well as numerous small, unnamed water bodies. Ledge Pond (elevation 1,309 ft or 399 m), previously listed as being within the Lake Sunapee watershed, actually flows directly to the Sugar River and on to the Connecticut.

=== Mountains in the Sunapee watershed region ===
To the north are Leavitt Hill, Hoyt Hill, Sanborn Hill, and Morgan Hill. To the south are Mount Sunapee, including its South Peak, and Bly Hill. The east has Kings Hill and Burpee Hill. The west of Lake Sunapee goes to Prospect Hill, Trow Hill, Brown Hill, Burkehaven Hill, and Blaisdell Hill.

== GLEON - Global Lake Ecological Observatory Network ==
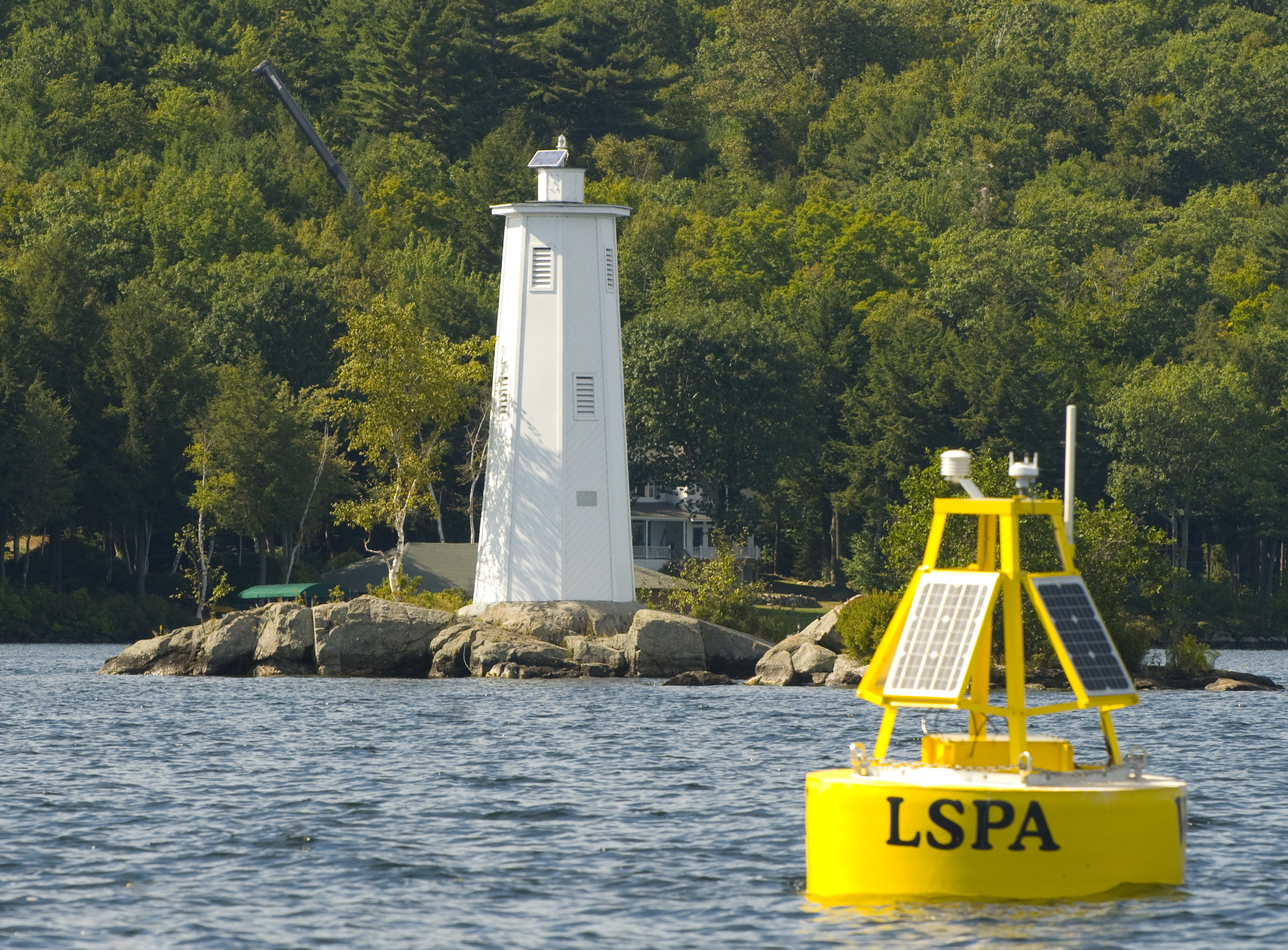
The Loon Lighthouse, one of three lighthouses on the lake

The LSPA (Lake Sunapee Protective Association) has deployed the Global Lake Ecological Observatory Network (GLEON) System in an area of the lake just east of Loon Island Lighthouse. LSPA has been collecting ecology data for more than 100 years.

== Beaches on Lake Sunapee ==
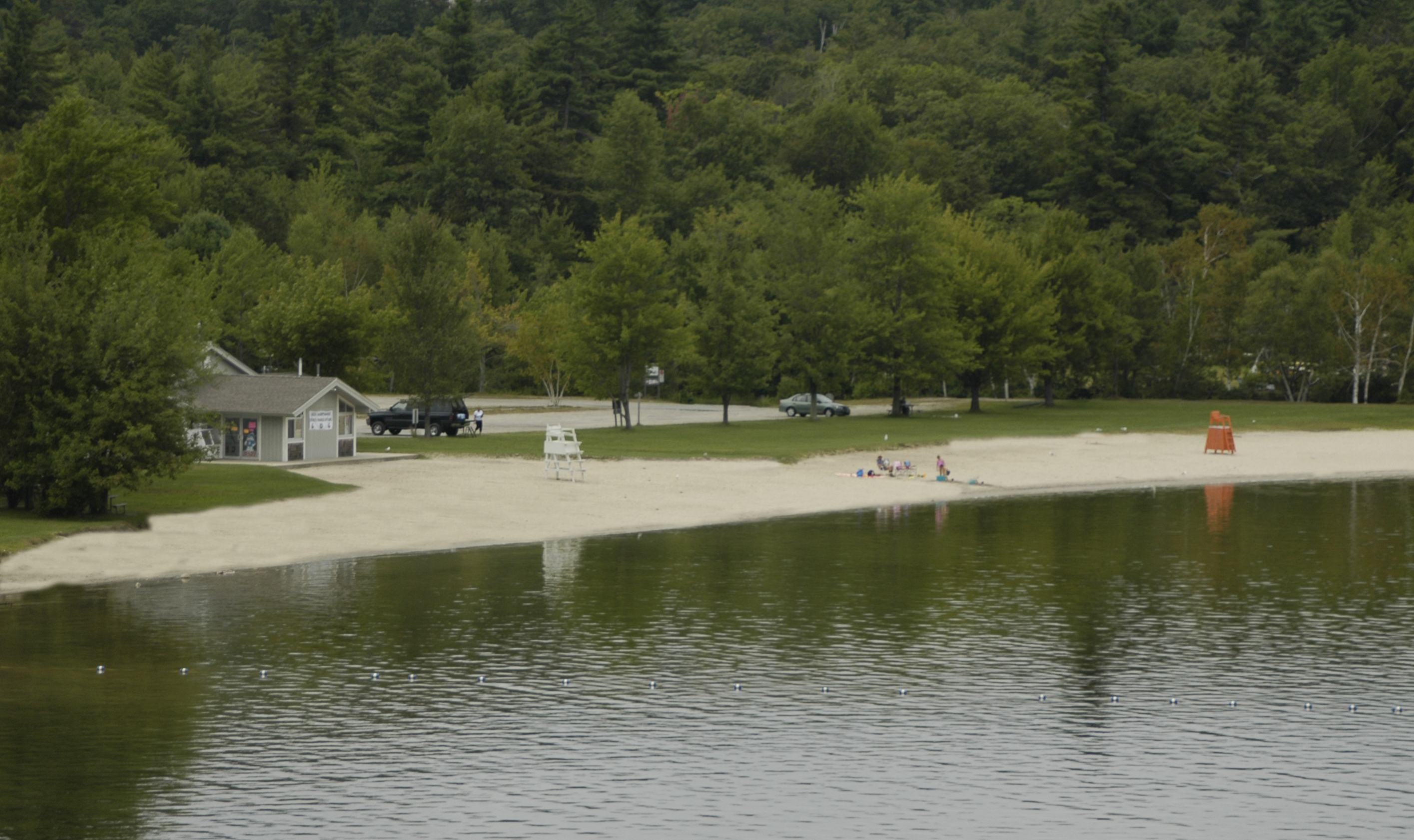
Mount Sunapee State Park beach

Lake Sunapee has seven white sandy beach areas: Sunapee Harbor; Dewey Beach, Georges Mills, Newbury Harbor, Soo-Nipi, Granliden, and the Mount Sunapee State Park beach.

Mount Sunapee State Park offers activities for all seasons. Probably best known for its skiing and snowboarding, the park also offers opportunities for front-country camping, hiking, and swimming on the beach on Lake Sunapee. The entrance to Mount Sunapee State Park Beach is on the traffic circle opposite the entrance to the Mount Sunapee ski area in Newbury off Route 103B. The sandy shore slopes gradually to crystal-clear deeper waters allowing bathers an opportunity to wade waist high for some distance from the shore line. The beach is the starting point for an occasional Iron Man Triathlon one-half mile swim sprint off the beach, followed by a 100-mile (160 km) bike race around the lake, followed by a marathon run around Lake Sunapee.

Depending on weather, the park is open from 9:30 am – 7:30 pm. Entrance fees apply for lake access during the summer months.

Mount Sunapee abuts Lake Sunapee at the mid-southern end of the lake in Newbury.

== Lighthouses ==
There are five lighthouses in New Hampshire; two on the Atlantic shore and three on Lake Sunapee. The Lake Sunapee lighthouses are Loon Island Lighthouse, Burkehaven Lighthouse and Lakeside Lighthouse. In the United States, Lake Sunapee is the smallest lake in the country with multiple lighthouses, and one of the few inland bodies of water to possess the structures.

== Sunapee Dam ==
Lake Sunapee was the source of water power for the mills that were built on the banks of the Sugar River as it meandered through Newport and Claremont. Benjamin Giles built the first gristmill in 1768. Later in 1813, James Wolcott built a textile mill in Newport. The flow of water out of Lake Sunapee, however, was not regular; there would be either too much flooding or too much drought. Mills had to shut down in periods of low water.

In 1820, some proprietors formed a group that led to the formation of the Sunapee Dam Corporation which, through an act of the New Hampshire legislature, obtained sole control of the lake's water level. The Dam Corporation lowered the dam threshold to 10 feet (3 m) below the low water mark with flood gates to control the level of the lake.

Operation of the dam was uneventful from 1820 to 1858. By 1858 tourism became an important industry as more people were attracted to the beauty of Lake Sunapee. As the lake was lowered to power mills, the steamboats had difficulty maneuvering the waters, and farmers had to extend fences out into the water to contain livestock. Docks had to be extended.

The controversy over the management of the water level became more contentious and continued to the turn of the 20th century. The New Hampshire legislature began to shift policy and concluded that (i) Lake Sunapee was mismanaged, and (ii) that all the lakes in New Hampshire should be managed for the benefit and access of the public. In 1905, legal actions ensued until finally all the parties to the suit, including the Lake Sunapee Protective Association, founded in that same year, agreed that the lake level must be maintained within the range of 1,108.5' and 1,111.5' elevation.

== Sailing ==
The Lake Sunapee Yacht Club is host to 23 Starboats, one of the largest inland fleets of the Olympic-class vessel. The Sunapee Starboat Regatta is the largest unsanctioned sailing event in the US. Lake Sunapee's own Brad Nichol and his teammate Andy Horton, Starboat contenders for the 2008 Olympics, were named 2006 Team of the Year by US SAILING, the national governing body of sailing in the United States.

== Lake Sunapee Protective Association (LSPA) ==
The LSPA (Lake Sunapee Protective Association) is the oldest environmental association in New Hampshire. The association has been working to protect and preserve lake Sunapee and other lakes in the region since 1898. "The lake is the one jewel that calls us all here," said the first president, Colonel Hopkins of LSPA. LSPA has been testing the waters of Lake Sunapee since 1950. Water is collected regularly and analyzed at Colby-Sawyer College Labs. The LSPA also maintains a Live Buoy and three professional-grade weather instruments with rain gauges at three locations on the lake. LSPA is a non-profit educational association.

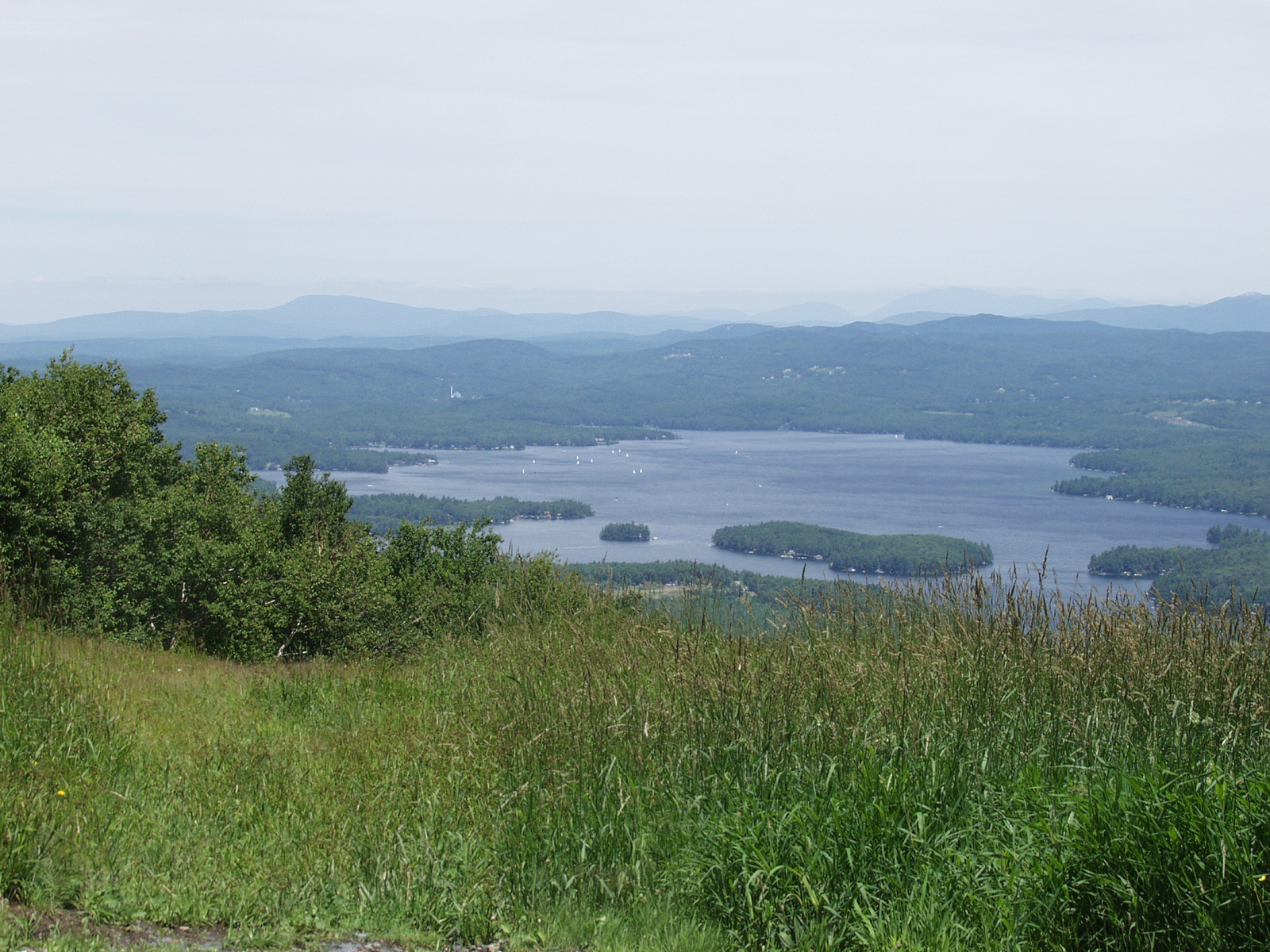
Looking north on Lake Sunapee from atop Mount Sunapee. Shows about 50% of Lake Sunapee water surface.

== Summer/winter activities ==
- League of NH Craftsmen's Fair: The League of New Hampshire Craftsmen starts this annual nine-day event on the first Saturday in August. More than 200 individual craft booths under tents at Mount Sunapee State Park in Newbury.
- Love Your Lake Day & Boat Parade: The LSPA hosts an annual display of classic boats at Sunapee Harbor in August. Family activities and displays are available on land "Under the Tent". The day is complemented by the availability of refreshments and a trip to the Sunapee Historical Museum.
- Sunapee Bike Race: Sanctioned by the USCF. Includes races for children as young as 10.

== See also ==
- List of lakes in New Hampshire
