= Newbury, New Hampshire =

- Town
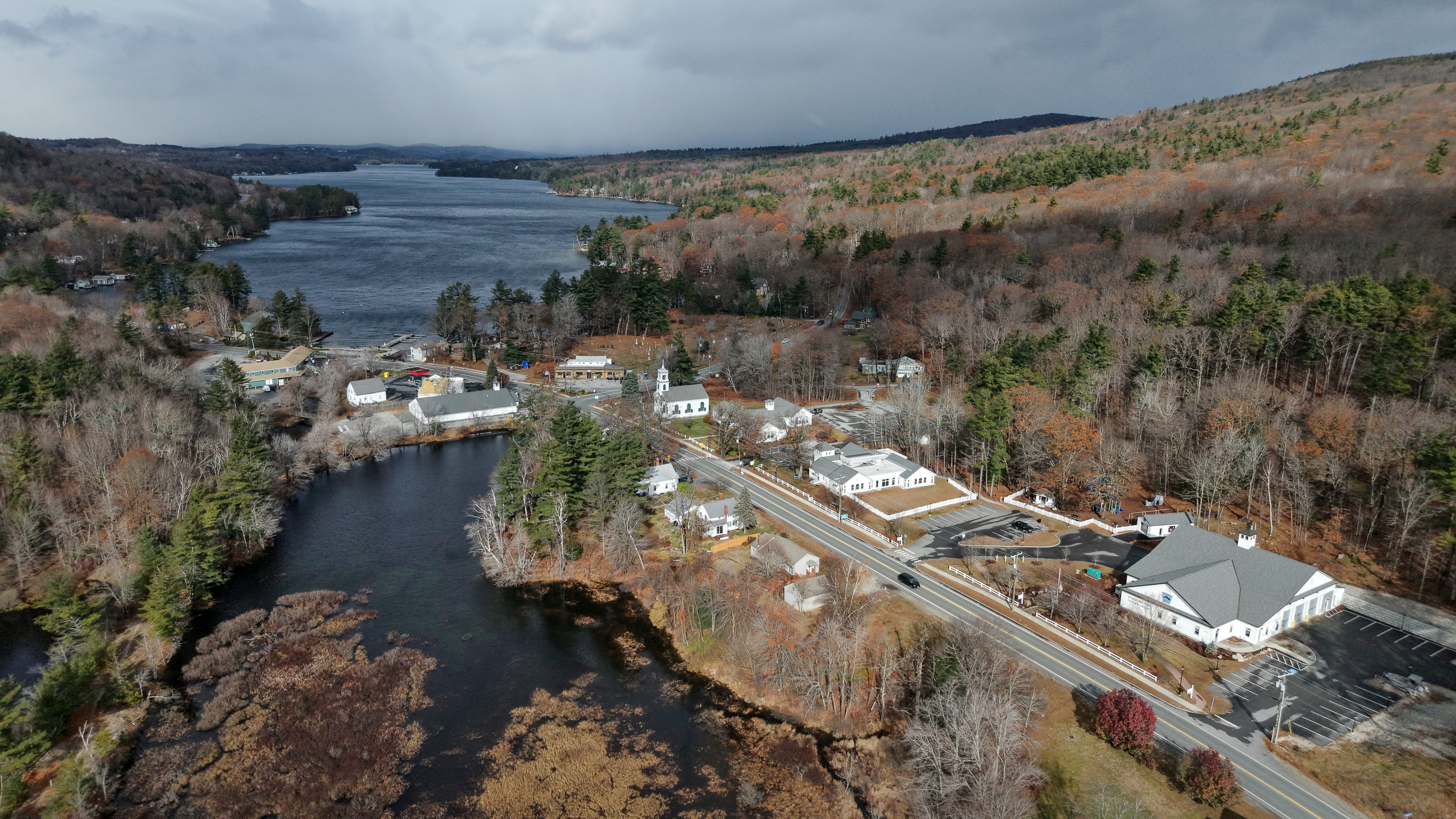
- Newbury, NH, from the south

- Seal

- Location in Merrimack County and the state of New Hampshire.
- Coordinates: 43°19′17″N 72°02′09″W
- Country: United States
- State: New Hampshire
- County: Merrimack
- Incorporated: 1778
- Villages: Newbury; Blodgett Landing; South Newbury

Area
  - Total: 38.1 sq mi (98.7 km^{2})
  - Land: 35.8 sq mi (92.8 km^{2})
  - Water: 2.3 sq mi (5.9 km^{2}) 5.94%
- Elevation: 1,155 ft (352 m)

Population (2020)
  - Total: 2,172
  - Density: 61/sq mi (23.4/km^{2})
- Time zone: UTC-5 (Eastern)
  - Summer (DST): UTC-4 (Eastern)
- ZIP codes: 03255 (Newbury, Mount Sunapee); 03272 (South Newbury)
- Area code: 603
- FIPS code: 33-50900
- GNIS feature ID: 873675
- Website: www.newbury.nh.gov

Newbury is a town in Merrimack County, New Hampshire, United States. The population was 2,172 at the 2020 census.

The town includes the villages of Newbury, Blodgett Landing and South Newbury, as well as a portion of Mount Sunapee Resort, a ski area, and a portion of Lake Sunapee, including the beach at Mount Sunapee State Park.

== History ==
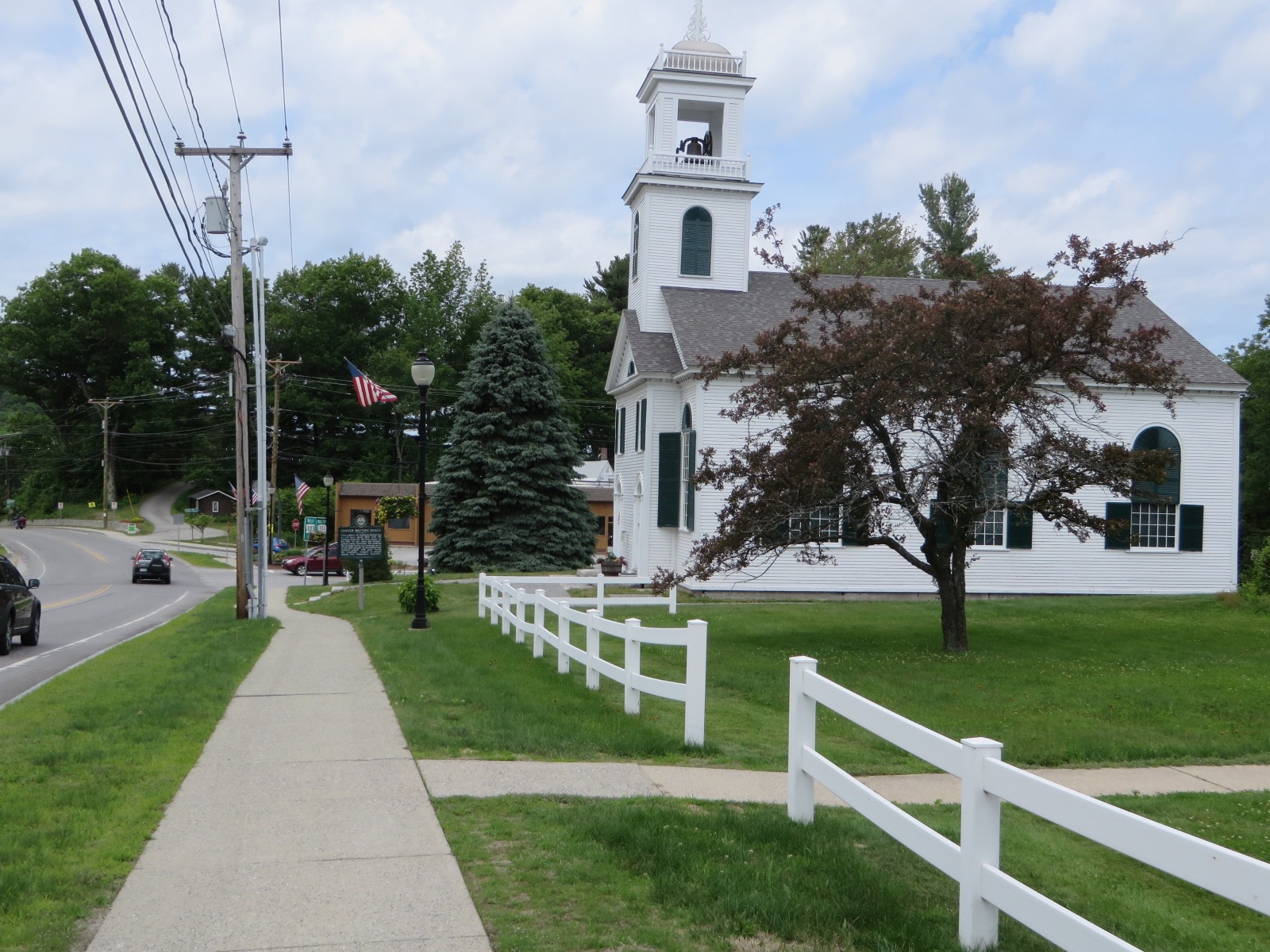
Center Meetinghouse

The town was founded as "Dantzic", after Danzig, a Baltic seaport. The first provincial grant in 1754 named the town "Hereford", in honor of Edward Devereaux, Viscount Hereford. John Wentworth renewed the grant in 1772 under the name "Fishersfield", for his brother-in-law John Fisher. The town was incorporated as "Newbury" in 1837, a name suggested by settlers originally from Newbury, Massachusetts.

== Geography ==
Newbury is in west-central New Hampshire, in western Merrimack County. The western border of the town is the Sullivan County line. The village of Newbury is located at the south end of Lake Sunapee near the geographic center of the town. The village is at the junction of New Hampshire Route 103 and 103A. Route 103 leads northwest, past the entrance to Mount Sunapee Resort (a state park) and into the town of Sunapee. To the southeast, Route 103 passes the village of South Newbury before entering the town of Bradford. Route 103A proceeds north, parallel to the east shore of Lake Sunapee, and passes the village of Blodgett Landing before entering the town of New London.

According to the U.S. Census Bureau, the town has a total area of 38.1 square miles (98.7 km^{2}), of which 35.8 square miles (92.8 km^{2}) are land and 2.3 square miles (5.9 km^{2}) are water, comprising 5.94% of the town. Mount Sunapee, the highest point in town, has an elevation of 2,726 feet (831 m) above sea level. The northern half of the town drains into Lake Sunapee, which in turns drains west via the Sugar River into the Connecticut River and thence to Long Island Sound. The southern half of the town, including the eastern side of Mount Sunapee, drains via Andrew Brook and the West Branch of the Warner River to the Warner River, which flows east to the Contoocook River, then into the Merrimack River, and ultimately to the Gulf of Maine.

== Demographics ==
Historical population
Census	Pop.	Note	%±
1840	816		—
1850	738		−9.6%
1860	698		−5.4%
1870	601		−13.9%
1880	590		−1.8%
1890	487		−17.5%
1900	424		−12.9%
1910	402		−5.2%
1920	362		−10.0%
1930	333		−8.0%
1940	506		52.0%
1950	320		−36.8%
1960	342		6.9%
1970	509		48.8%
1980	961		88.8%
1990	1,347		40.2%
2000	1,702		26.4%
2010	2,072		21.7%
2020	2,172		4.8%
U.S. Decennial Census

As of the census of 2000, there were 1,702 people, 691 households, and 507 families residing in the town. The population density was 47.5 inhabitants per square mile (18.3/km^{2}). There were 1,311 housing units at an average density of 36.6 per square mile (14.1/km^{2}). The racial makeup of the town was 98.35% White, 0.41% African American, 0.06% Native American, 0.12% Asian, 0.29% from other races, and 0.76% from two or more races. Hispanic or Latino of any race were 1.18% of the population.

There were 691 households, out of which 30.7% had children under the age of 18 living with them, 63.5% were married couples living together, 6.9% had a female householder with no husband present, and 26.5% were non-families. 20.7% of all households were made up of individuals, and 8.0% had someone living alone who was 65 years of age or older. The average household size was 2.46 and the average family size was 2.84.

In the town, the population was spread out, with 22.8% under the age of 18, 4.8% from 18 to 24, 28.3% from 25 to 44, 28.0% from 45 to 64, and 16.2% who were 65 years of age or older. The median age was 42 years. For every 100 females, there were 102.9 males. For every 100 females age 18 and over, there were 97.3 males.

The median income for a household in the town was $58,026, and the median income for a family was $61,389. Males had a median income of $42,031 versus $29,022 for females. The per capita income for the town was $29,521. None of the families and 1.8% of the population were living below the poverty line, including none under eighteen and none of those over 64.

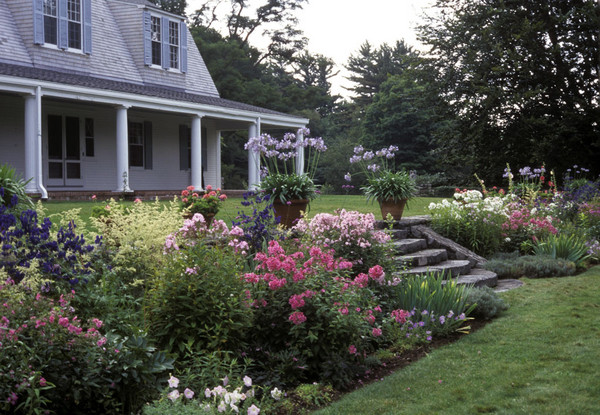
The Fells

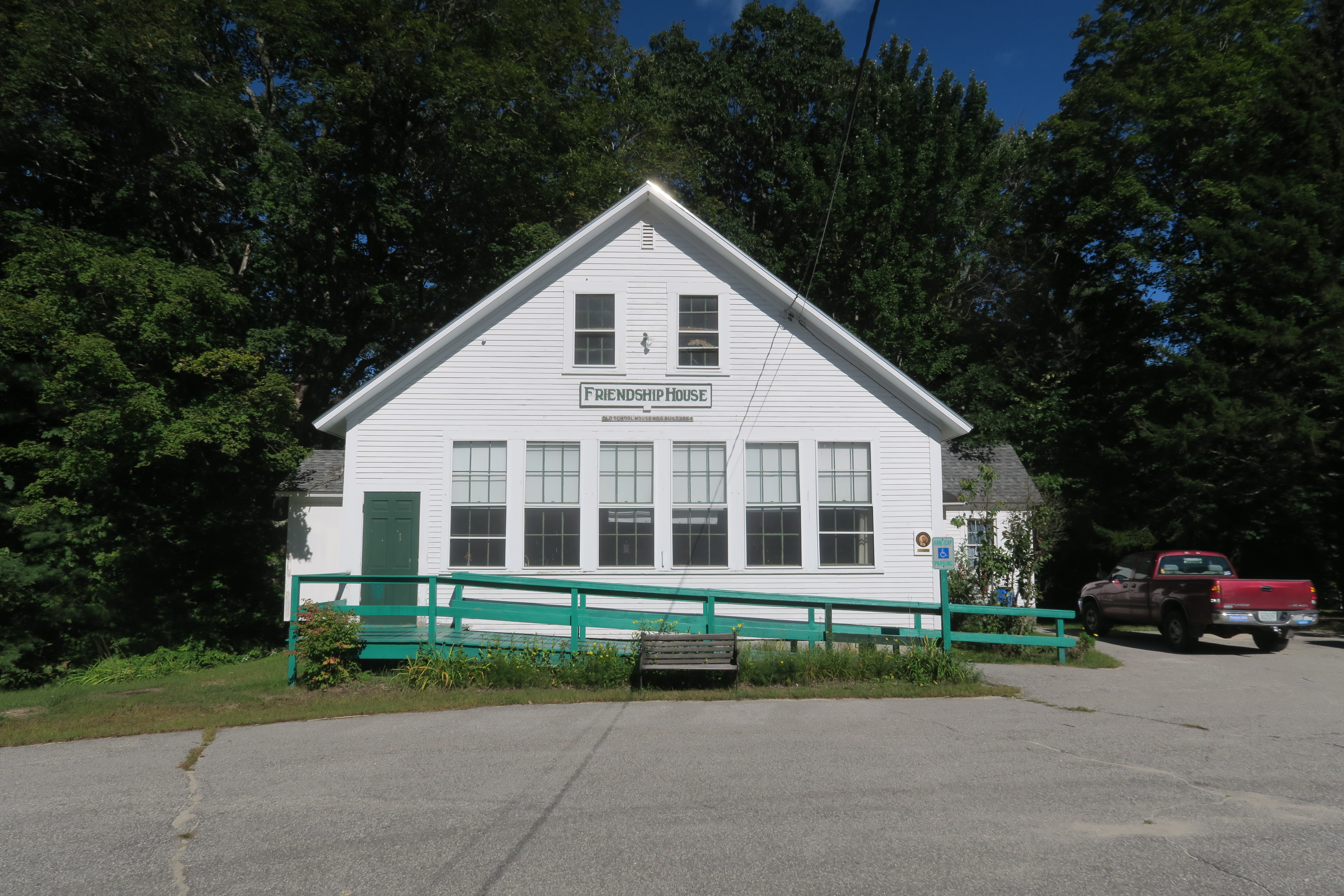
Friendship House in South Newbury

== Arts and culture ==
=== Sites of interest ===
- The Fells, adjacent to John Hay National Wildlife Refuge, part of an 876 acres (3.55 km^{2}) protected area
- A caboose museum at Bell Cove
- Center Meetinghouse, a church erected in 1832
- Lake Solitude, a lake within Mount Sunapee State Park

== Infrastructure ==
=== Highways ===
- New Hampshire Route 103
- New Hampshire Route 103A
- New Hampshire Route 103B

== Notable people ==
- John Milton Hay (1838–1905), 37th United States Secretary of State
- Dan Wolf, member of New Hampshire House of Representatives
