= New Hampshire Route 103 =

State highway in New Hampshire, US

New Hampshire Route 103
- Map of western New Hampshire with NH 103 highlighted in red

Route information
- Maintained by NHDOT
- Length: 48.300 mi (77.731 km)

Major junctions
- West end: VT 12 in Ascutney, VT
- NH 11 / NH 12 in Claremont; NH 10 in Newport; NH 11 in Sunapee; I-89 in Warner
- East end: US 202 / NH 9 in Hopkinton

Location
- Country: United States
- State: New Hampshire
- Counties: Sullivan, Merrimack

Highway system
- New Hampshire Highway System; Interstate; US; State; Turnpikes
← NH 102	→ NH 104

NH 103 leaving eastern terminus in Hopkinton, NH (January 2024)

New Hampshire Route 103 (abbreviated NH 103) is a 48.300-mile-long (77.731 km) east–west highway in west-central New Hampshire, United States. The highway runs from Claremont, at the Vermont border on the Connecticut River, to Hopkinton, west of Concord.

The western terminus of NH 103 is in Claremont at the New Hampshire–Vermont state line on the Connecticut River, running concurrently with New Hampshire Route 12. After intersecting with New Hampshire Route 12A, the road continues eastward for 3.793 miles (6.104 km) into the center of Claremont, where NH 103 splits off from NH 12 and merges with New Hampshire Route 11. The highway then runs eastward merged with NH 11 for a distance of 12.991 miles (20.907 km). The road splits off from NH 11 east of Newport. Northwest of Hopkinton, the road runs merged with New Hampshire Route 127 for a distance of 2.127 miles (3.423 km). The eastern terminus of NH 103 is in Hopkinton at U.S. Route 202 and New Hampshire Route 9.

== Major intersections ==
County	Location	mi	km	Destinations	Notes
Sullivan	Claremont	0.000	0.000	VT 12 north to I-91 – Ascutney	Western terminus; western end of concurrency with NH 12/NH 103 concurrency
Sullivan	Claremont	0.545	0.877	NH 12A (Windsor Road / Jarvis Hill Road) – North Charlestown, West Lebanon	
Sullivan	Claremont	4.338	6.981	NH 11 west / NH 12 south (Pleasant Street) – Charlestown	Opera House Square; eastern end of concurrency with NH 12; western end of concurrency with NH 11
Sullivan	Claremont	4.543	7.311	NH 120 north (North Street) – Lebanon	Southern terminus of NH 120
Sullivan	Newport	13.950	22.450	NH 10 south (South Main Street) – Goshen, Keene	Western end of concurrency with NH 10
Sullivan	Newport	14.181	22.822	NH 10 north (North Main Street) – Grantham	Eastern end of concurrency with NH 10
Sullivan	Sunapee	17.327	27.885	NH 11 east – Sunapee, Georges Mills, New London	Village of Wendell; eastern end of concurrency with NH 11
Merrimack	Newbury	21.169	34.068	NH 103B north (Edgemont Road) – Sunapee	Southern terminus of NH 103B
Merrimack	Newbury	23.758	38.235	NH 103A north – New London	Southern terminus of NH 103A
Merrimack	Bradford	29.959	48.214	NH 114 (Sutton Road/Henniker Road) – New London, Henniker	
Merrimack	Warner	36.278– 36.619	58.384– 58.933	I-89 – Concord, Lebanon	Exit 9 on I-89
Merrimack	Warner	39.205	63.094	I-89 south – Contoocook, Concord	Exit 8 on I-89; exit to I-89 south and entrance from I-89 north
Merrimack	Warner	41.933– 42.412	67.485– 68.255	I-89 – Concord, Warner, Lebanon	Exit 7 on I-89
Merrimack	Warner	43.091	69.348	NH 127 north – Webster, Salisbury	Village of Davisville; western end of concurrency with NH 127
Merrimack	Hopkinton	45.218	72.771	NH 127 south (Maple Street) – West Hopkinton, Henniker	Village of Contoocook; eastern end of concurrency with NH 127
Merrimack	Hopkinton	48.300	77.731	US 202 / NH 9 (Franklin Pierce Hwy.) to I-89 – Concord, Keene, Lebanon	Eastern terminus
1.000 mi = 1.609 km; 1.000 km = 0.621 mi: Concurrency terminus; Incomplete access

== Suffixed routes ==
=== New Hampshire Route 103A ===
New Hampshire Route 103A
- Location: Newbury–New London
- Length: 7.720 mi (12.424 km)

New Hampshire Route 103A (abbreviated NH 103A) is a 7.720-mile-long (12.424 km) secondary north–south highway in Merrimack County, New Hampshire. NH 103A connects New London with Newbury. NH 103A runs down the entire length of the east side of Lake Sunapee and provides access to the local roads along the lakeshore. NH 103A is locally named Lakeside Road.

The southern terminus of NH 103A is at New Hampshire Route 103 at the south end of the lake. The northern terminus is at New Hampshire Route 11, Newport Road, at the north end of the lake near Interstate 89.

=== New Hampshire Route 103B ===
New Hampshire Route 103B
- Location: Newbury–Sunapee
- Length: 3.441 mi (5.538 km)

New Hampshire Route 103B (abbreviated NH 103B) is a 3.441-mile-long (5.538 km) secondary north–south highway located predominantly in Sullivan County (with a small segment in Merrimack County) in western New Hampshire. NH 103B connects Newbury with Sunapee. NH 103B runs along the western shore of Lake Sunapee and provides access to the local roads along the lakeshore. NH 103B is locally named Edgemont Road.

The southern terminus of NH 103B is at New Hampshire Route 103 on the southwest side of the lake. The road runs north into the village of Sunapee about midway up the west side of the lake. The northern terminus of NH 103B is at the junction with New Hampshire Route 11 in the village center.
