= Georges Mills, New Hampshire =

Unincorporated community in New Hampshire, United States

- Unincorporated community
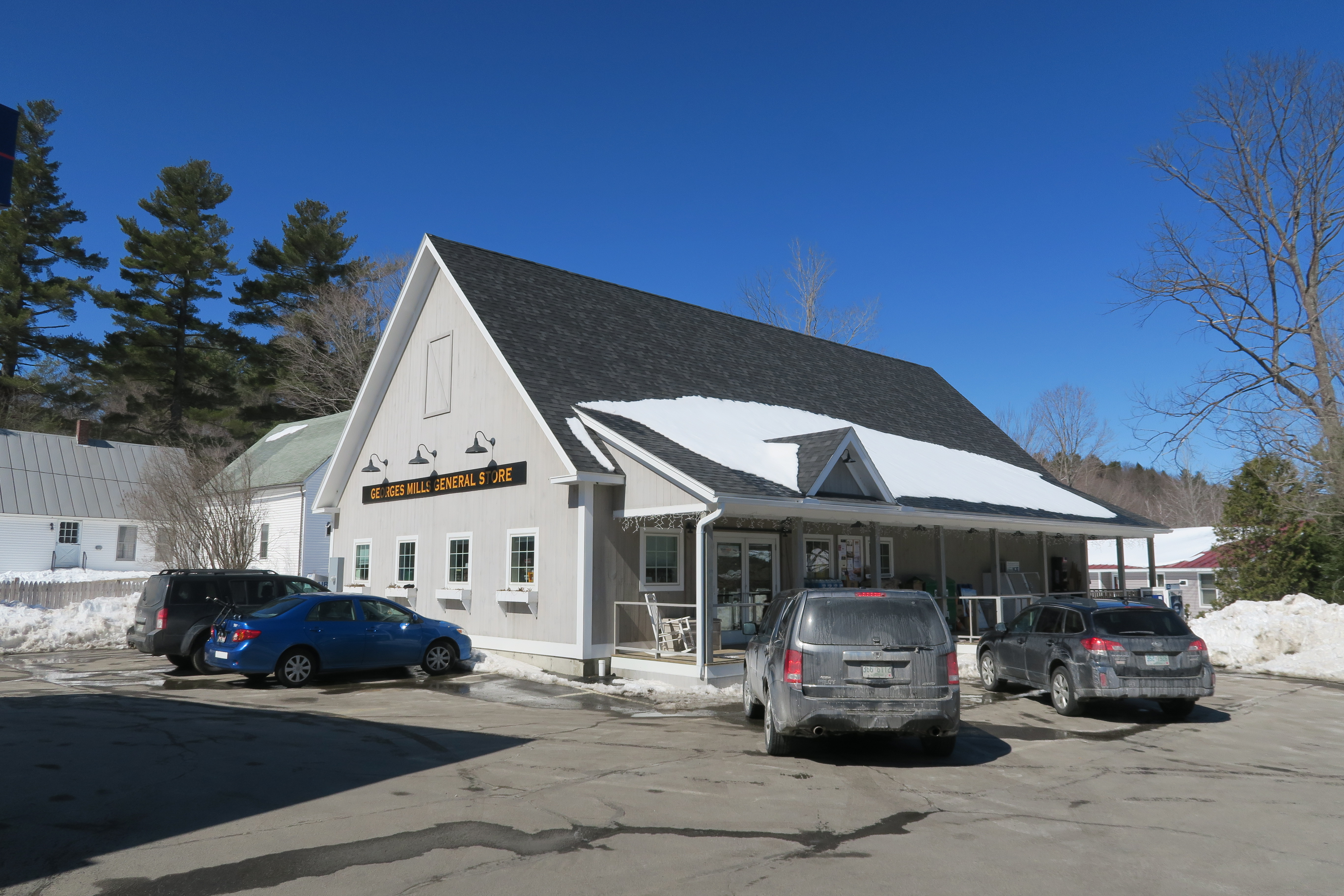
- Georges Mills General Store

- Location within New Hampshire Location within the United States
- Coordinates: 43°25′54″N 72°04′02″W
- Country: United States
- State: New Hampshire
- County: Sullivan
- Town: Sunapee
- Elevation: 1,138 ft (347 m)
- Time zone: UTC-5 (Eastern (EST))
  - Summer (DST): UTC-4 (EDT)
- ZIP code: 03751
- Area code: 603
- GNIS feature ID: 867046

Georges Mills is an unincorporated community in the town of Sunapee in Sullivan County, New Hampshire, United States. It is located in the northeastern corner of the town, between the northern end of Lake Sunapee and the south shore of Otter Pond. New Hampshire Route 11 runs through the village, leading east to New London and south to the center of Sunapee. It is also served by exit 12A on Interstate 89, 0.5 miles (0.8 km) north of the village.

Georges Mills has a separate ZIP code (03751) from the rest of the town of Sunapee. It is named for Daniel G. George (1840-1916), Union Navy sailor.
