= Warner (CDP), New Hampshire =

Census-designated place in New Hampshire, United States

Warner, New Hampshire
- Census-designated place
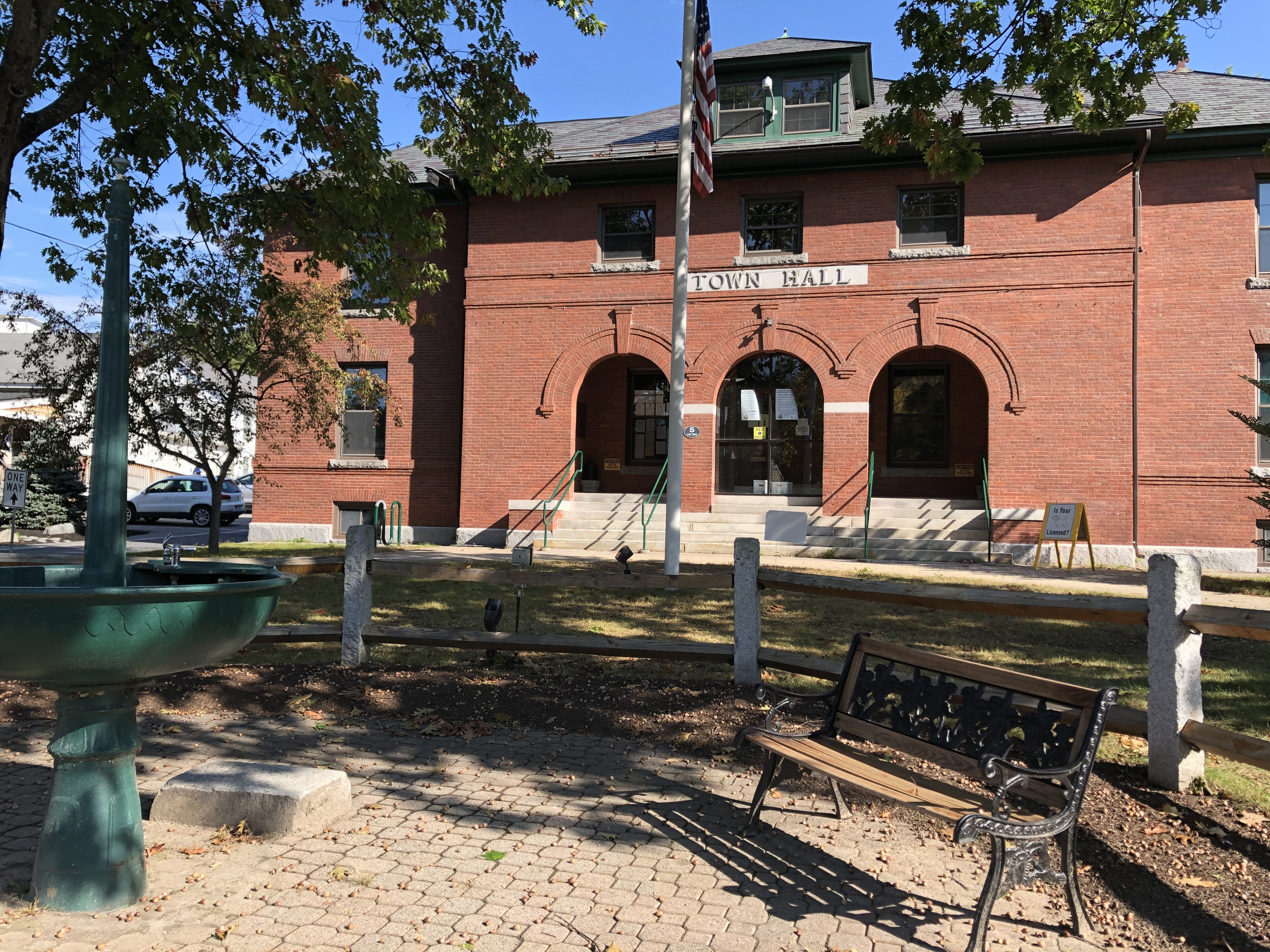
- The Warner town hall is in the village center

- Location within New Hampshire Location within the United States
- Coordinates: 43°16′50″N 71°49′00″W
- Country: United States
- State: New Hampshire
- County: Merrimack
- Town: Warner

Area
  - Total: 0.80 sq mi (2.07 km^{2})
  - Land: 0.80 sq mi (2.07 km^{2})
  - Water: 0 sq mi (0.00 km^{2})
- Elevation: 489 ft (149 m)

Population (2020)
  - Total: 453
  - Density: 566.2/sq mi (218.63/km^{2})
- Time zone: UTC-5 (Eastern (EST))
  - Summer (DST): UTC-4 (EDT)
- ZIP code: 03278
- Area code: 603
- FIPS code: 33-78500
- GNIS feature ID: 2629745

Warner is a census-designated place (CDP) and the main village in the town of Warner, New Hampshire, United States. The population of the CDP was 453 at the 2020 census, out of 2,937 in the entire town.

== Geography ==
The CDP is slightly north of the geographic center of the town of Warner, on both sides of the Warner River. It is bordered to the southwest by Interstate 89 and extends north along the highway to Exit 9 (New Hampshire Route 103). The northern edge of the CDP is north of Split Rock Road and Kirtland Street, and the eastern extent is at Willow Brook, a tributary of the Warner River.

Route 103 passes through the center of Warner, leading southeast 7 miles (11 km) to Contoocook and west 8 miles (13 km) to Bradford. Interstate 89 leads southeast from Warner 19 miles (31 km) to Concord, the state capital, and northwest 37 miles (60 km) to Lebanon.

According to the U.S. Census Bureau, the Warner CDP has a total area of 0.81 square miles (2.1 km^{2}), all of it recorded as land.

== Demographics ==
Historical population
Census	Pop.	Note	%±
2010	444		—
2020	453		2.0%
U.S. Decennial Census

As of the census of 2010, there were 444 people, 204 households, and 118 families residing in the CDP. There were 216 housing units, of which 12, or 5.6%, were vacant. The racial makeup of the CDP was 98.6% white, 0.2% African American, 0.2% Native American, 0.0% Asian, 0.0% Pacific Islander, 0.0% some other race, and 0.9% from two or more races. 0.0% of the population were Hispanic or Latino of any race.

Of the 204 households in the CDP, 24.5% had children under the age of 18 living with them, 44.6% were headed by married couples living together, 8.8% had a female householder with no husband present, and 42.2% were non-families. 36.8% of all households were made up of individuals, and 22.6% were someone living alone who was 65 years of age or older. The average household size was 2.18, and the average family size was 2.86.

19.1% of residents in the CDP were under the age of 18, 5.6% were from age 18 to 24, 22.1% were from 25 to 44, 28.3% were from 45 to 64, and 25.2% were 65 years of age or older. The median age was 47.8 years. For every 100 females, there were 87.3 males. For every 100 females age 18 and over, there were 84.1 males.

For the period 2011–15, the estimated median annual income for a household was $53,657, and the median income for a family was $60,792. The per capita income for the CDP was $28,530.
