= Bement Covered Bridge =

- U.S. National Register of Historic Places
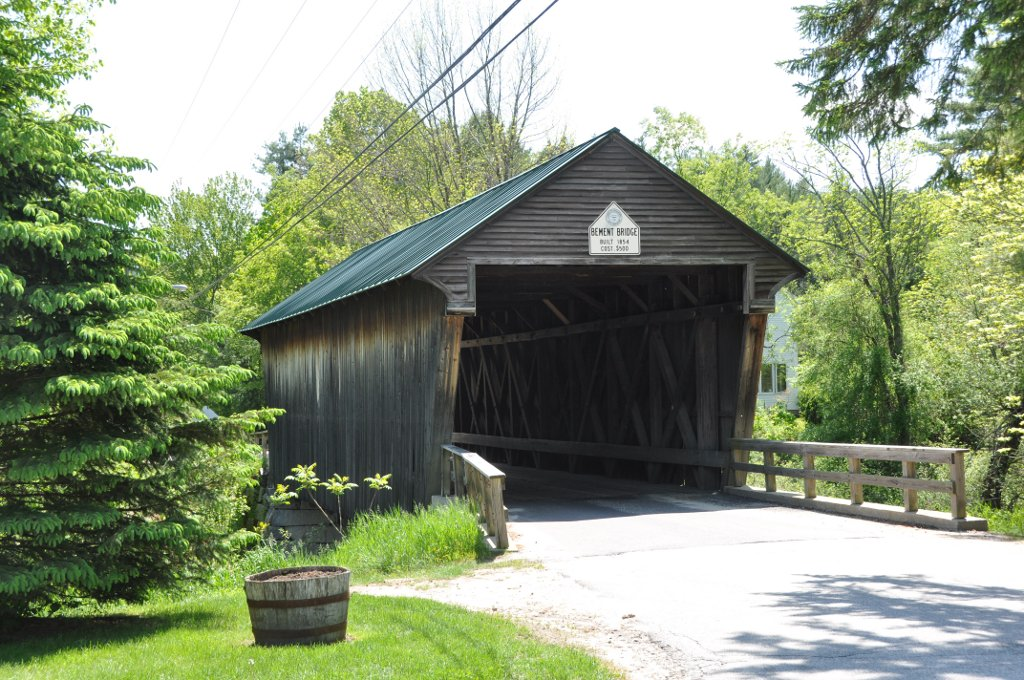

- Location within New Hampshire Location within the United States
- Location: Center Rd., Bradford, New Hampshire
- Coordinates: 43°15′51″N 71°57′13″W
- Area: 0.1 acres (0.040 ha)
- Built: 1854
- NRHP reference No.: 76000128
- Added to NRHP: November 21, 1976

The Bement Covered Bridge is a historic wooden covered bridge on Center Road over the Warner River in Bradford, New Hampshire. A Long-truss bridge, it was built in 1854, and is one of New Hampshire's small number of surviving 19th-century covered bridges. It was listed on the National Register of Historic Places in 1976.

== Description and history ==
The Bement Covered Bridge is located just south of Bradford's main village, carrying Center Road over the Warner River just south of New Hampshire Route 103 near the Bradford Pines Natural Area. It is a single-span structure with a unique truss design, with a roadway length of 63 feet (19 m), a roof length of 71 feet 2 inches (21.69 m), and a roadway width of 19 feet 2.5 inches (5.855 m), sufficient for one lane of traffic. It rests on stone abutments that have been partially faced and topped with concrete. It is covered by a gabled roof, and its sidewalls are clad in vertical board siding. The gable ends above the portals (which are 10 feet 6 inches (3.20 m) in clearance) are finished in wooden clapboards.

This bridge was built in 1854 for $500, and is the third bridge to occupy the site. Although it has long been thought that the patentee of the trusses, Stephen Long, was responsible for its construction, there is no documentary support for this. It is possible that Long's brother, Dr. Moses Long, a resident of nearby Warner, may have played a role in its construction as an agent for his brother. The bridge is named for local resident Samuel Bement, whose property the second (1818) bridge was identified as being near in town records. It provides access to only a modest number of residences.

The bridge was closed in 1968 after being found structurally unsound, but Bradford voters chose restoration over replacement. A major rehabilitation was completed in 1969, and another extensive restoration was completed in 2020-2021. Hoyle, Tanner & Associates, Inc. led the engineering, with Daniels Construction, Inc. of Ascutney, Vermont, completing the construction. The $1.64 million project retained much of the historic timber framing, rebuilt the abutments, replaced the bottom chord, and included extensive structural and roadway improvements. The Bement Bridge reopened on June 13, 2021. It is maintained by the Town of Bradford.

The budget of $1.65 million was mostly paid for by state and federal funds, with Bradford contributing approximately $205,000.

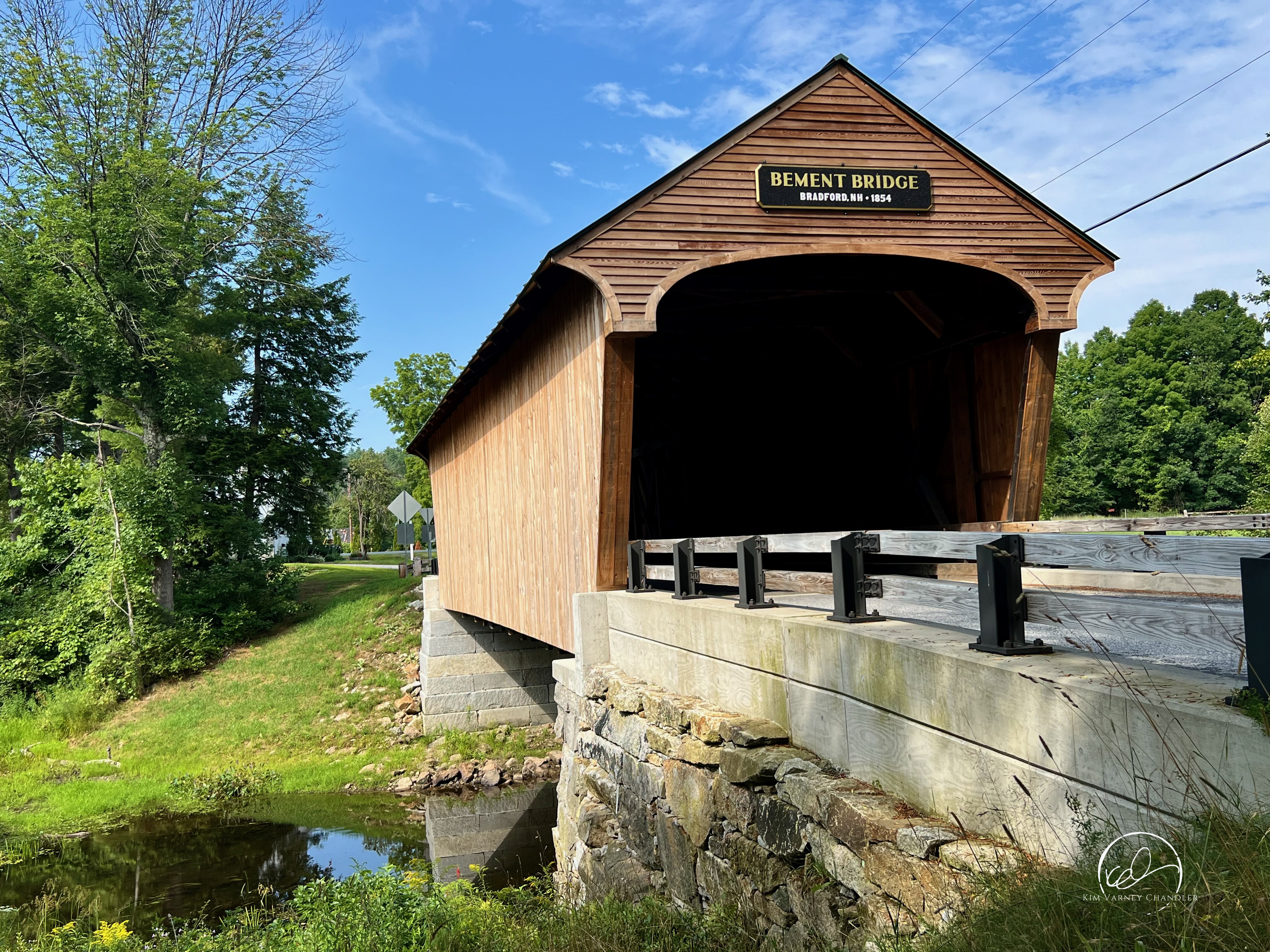
Bement Bridge August 2024

== See also ==
- List of New Hampshire covered bridges
- National Register of Historic Places listings in Merrimack County, New Hampshire
- List of bridges on the National Register of Historic Places in New Hampshire
