= Frederick Myron Colby =

American writer, educator and politician

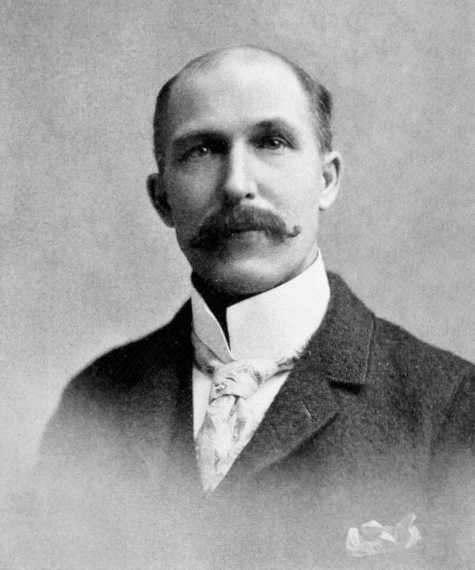
- Born: December 9, 1848; Warner, New Hampshire, US
- Died: May 19, 1920 (aged 71); Warner, New Hampshire
- Occupations: Writer, educator, politician
- Political party: Democrat
- Spouse: H. Maria George Colby (m. 1882; died 1910)

Signature
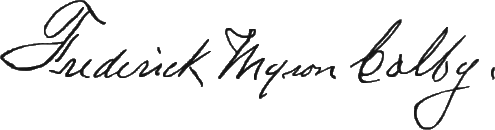

Frederick Myron Colby (December 9, 1848 – May 19, 1920) was an American writer, educator and politician.

== Biography ==
Frederick Myron Colby was born in Warner, New Hampshire, on December 9, 1848.

He wrote for publications aimed at youths including The Youth's Companion and St. Nicholas. He also contributed to Granite Monthly. He also wrote a series of historical books aimed primarily at children. He was the head of Simonds Free High School in his hometown of Warner, New Hampshire, from 1910 to 1915. He was a Democrat who held local offices in Warner and ran unsuccessfully for the U.S. Congress in 1908. He married the writer H. Maria George Colby on December 24, 1882.

Colby died at his home in Warner on May 19, 1920.
