= Waterloo Historic District (Warner, New Hampshire) =

Historic district in New Hampshire, United States

- U.S. National Register of Historic Places
- U.S. Historic district
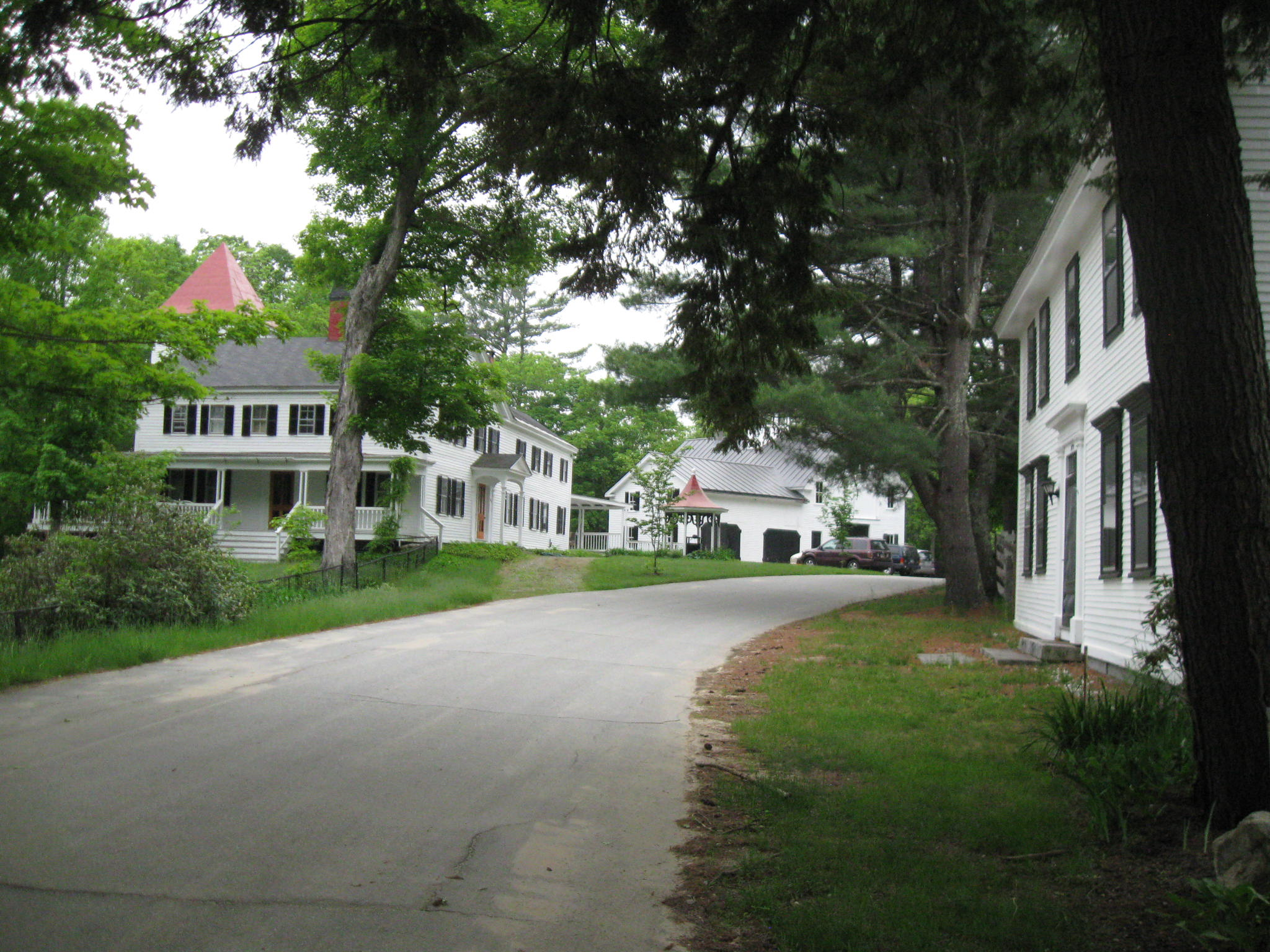

- Location within New Hampshire Location within the United States
- Location: 78-183 Waterloo St., 12 and 68 Newmarket Rd., 4 Willoughby-Colby Rd., Bean Road Cemetery, Warner, New Hampshire
- Coordinates: 43°17′19″N 71°51′15″W
- Area: 50 acres (20 ha)
- Built: 1791
- Architectural style: Georgian, Federal
- NRHP reference No.: 03000926
- Added to NRHP: September 13, 2003

The Waterloo Historic District encompasses the site of one of the first mills on the Warner River, near the Waterloo Falls in Warner, New Hampshire. The 50-acre (20 ha) district includes most of the original 60-acre (24 ha) land grant for the mill site. It extends along Waterloo Street and Newmarket Street for a length of about 1 mile (1.6 km), from where Newmarket Street crosses the Warner River to where Waterloo Street crosses a brook. In addition to its industrial history, the district is notable for being home to two nationally known politicians: William E. Chandler (1835-1917), who served as United States Senator and as United States Secretary of the Navy, and Nehemiah G. Ordway (1828-1907), the seventh governor of the Dakota Territory.

This part of Warner was first sold off for development in the 1770s, and the first sawmill was operating by 1789. The oldest surviving house in the district, a 1 1/2-story Cape style house, was built in 1791, and a significant number of houses in the district were built before 1820. William Chandler's house, purchased by him in 1872, was built in 1805, and he purchased a nearby 1820s house for staff he needed for entertaining high-profile guests. Nehemiah Ordway's house, at the corner of Newmarket and Waterloo, was built in 1828, but was restyled in the early 20th century to give it a Colonial Revival appearance.

Several non-residential buildings have survived, although most have been repurposed into residences. The Bean Tavern is a Georgian structure built in 1793. Two structures that served as train stations survive, one built in 1849, which was moved a short distance to make way for the second, built in 1910. The principal surviving industrial building is the 1836 Chandler Mill, whose surviving 2 1/2-story portion stands off Newmarket Street between the railroad tracks and the river. Remnants of earlier mill foundations lie nearby. The district also includes a cemetery (1815), and a c. 1810 one-room schoolhouse.

The district was listed on the National Register of Historic Places in 2003. It also includes the Waterloo Covered Bridge, a separately-listed bridge which carries Newmarket Street over the river.

== See also ==
- National Register of Historic Places listings in Merrimack County, New Hampshire
