= Jacob Osgood =

Jacob Osgood (16 March 1777 – 29 November 1844) was the founder of a 19th-century Christian sect in New Hampshire known as the Osgoodites.

== Early life ==
Osgood was born in 1777 in South Hampton, New Hampshire. At age 12, his family moved to Warner, New Hampshire. When he was a young adult, he married Miriam Stevens; together they had eight children.

== Osgoodites ==
Osgood became a farmer in Warner and was a member of the local Congregational Church. In the early 19th century, both Calvinism and Universalism were becoming popular theological perspectives among New England Congregationalists. Osgood was averse to both approaches and left the Congregational Church. He joined the Free Will Baptists for a time, but by 1812 he had begun his own separate congregation.

Osgood taught his version of Christianity to others in Warner. He claimed to be a prophet who could heal people through the laying on of hands. Osgood taught that anything that was established by law was the work of Satan. Members refused to vote, serve in the military, or pay taxes. Osgood preached frequently on the evils of the courts, lawyers, judges, town meetings, medical doctors, and paid clergy. In 1819, as a result of some of his followers refusing to pay taxes, some Osgoodites were arrested and imprisoned. In 1820, Osgood was imprisoned in New Hampshire, where he began to write his autobiography and set out his teachings in detail. In 1823, while on a preaching trip, Osgood fell off his horse and was severely injured. He refused to seek medical care from a doctor and later claimed that he was healed by the laying on of hands of his fellow believers.

Osgood and his followers dressed in an old-fashioned manner and avoided spending time on personal grooming or other issues of appearance. The men and women in the group avoided cutting their hair and male Osgoodites were usually identifiable by their unkempt appearances.

One of Osgood's first disciples was Thomas Hackett and his following grew throughout New Hampshire in the 1820s. The first congregation of Osgoodites was established in Warner, with a second one of approximately thirty families being organized in Canterbury in the early 1820s. Osgood also had numerous followers in Mink Hill, Sutton, Bradford, Gilford, Gilmanton, South Hampton, and Newton. He also attracted followers from Amesbury, Newbury, and Byfield in northern Massachusetts. The group did not build church buildings, but met in homes or schoolhouses and held regular outdoor revival meetings at which Osgood would preach. Osgood weighed more than three hundred pounds, and it was customary for him to preach with his eyes closed while seated in front of the congregation.

== Death ==
Osgood fell ill in August 1844 and died on 29 November. After Osgood's death, Charles H. Colby and Nehemiah Ordway succeeded him as joint leaders of the Osgoodites. The Osgoodite movement continued until the 1880s, but by 1890 it had entirely disappeared from New Hampshire. Judith Colby, the last "Osgoodite" died on January 26, 1894.
