= Dalton Covered Bridge =

- U.S. National Register of Historic Places
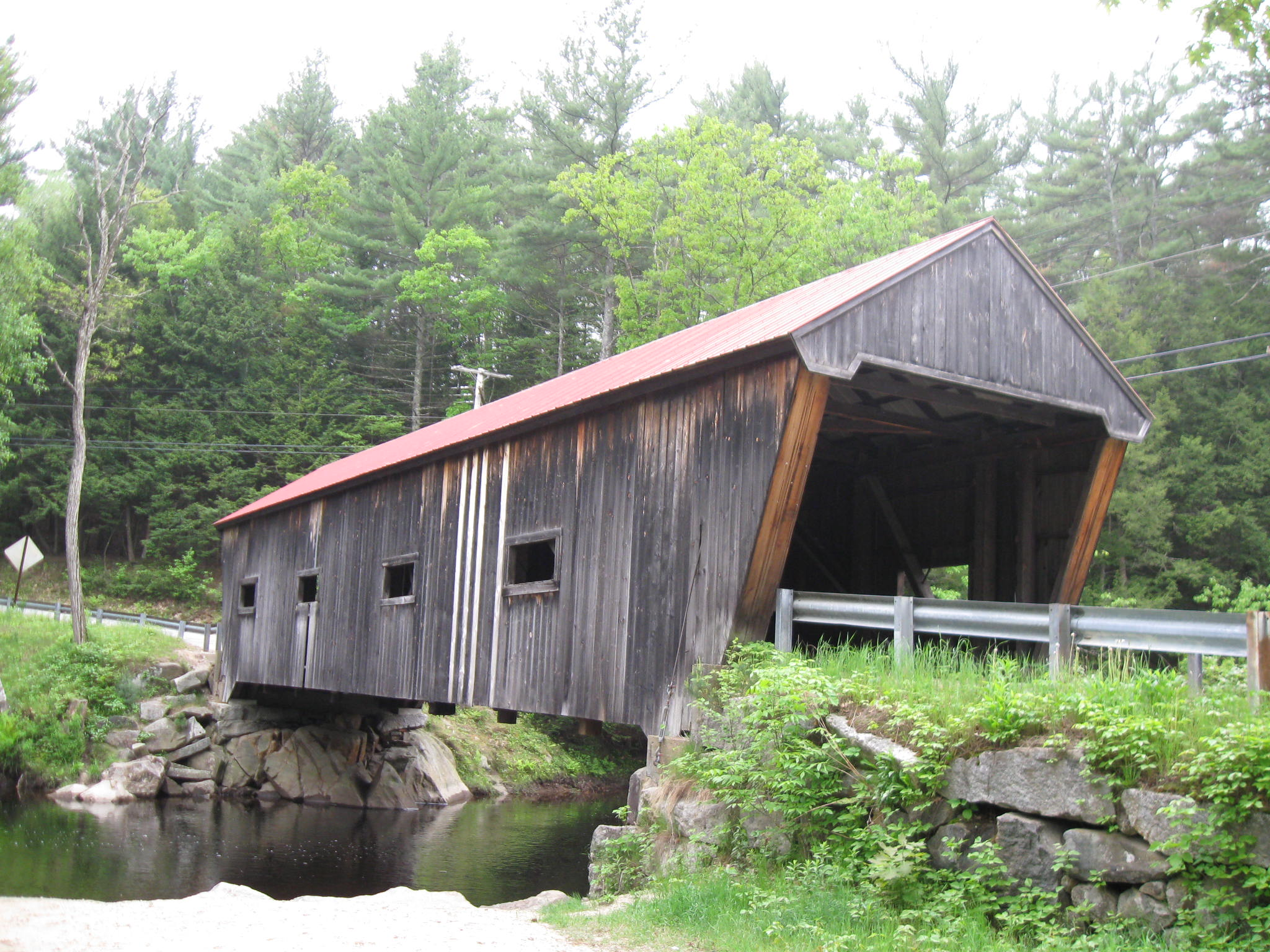

- Location within New Hampshire Location within the United States
- Location: Joppa Road; Warner, New Hampshire
- Coordinates: 43°16′36″N 71°48′43″W
- Area: 0.1 acres (0.040 ha)
- Built: 1853
- Architect: Multiple
- Architectural style: panel truss
- NRHP reference No.: 76000221
- Added to NRHP: November 21, 1976

The Dalton Covered Bridge, also called the Dalton Bridge, is a historic covered bridge that carries Joppa Road over the Warner River in Warner, New Hampshire. Its name refers to a nearby resident (first "Mrs. Dalton", then "Widow Dalton") at the time of its construction. The bridge was built in 1853 by Joshua Sanborn, and its original abutments were built by George Sawyer and Webster Davis; all were local residents. The bridge has a span of 76 feet (23 m), with a total bridge length (including portals and roof) of 84 feet (26 m). The bridge is 17 feet (5.2 m) wide, with a road bed width of 14 feet (4.3 m), although guard rails have reduced its usable width to just under 13 feet (4.0 m).

The bridge uses a combination of truss types to support the load, following a patent issued in 1837 to Stephen Long, who also patented the Long truss. Its primary support mechanism is a king post truss, in which a vertical post is joined to chord members by iron bolts. This primary support is supplemented by a queen post truss system that flank the king truss walls. The trusses are mounted on abutments that are primarily fieldstone, but were capped in concrete in the 20th century. The mounting is secured by iron tension rods. The exterior walls of the bridge are vertical boarding with four windows; this finish was also rehabilitated in the 1960s. The gabled roof is made of corrugated metal.

The bridge was listed on the National Register of Historic Places in 1976.

== See also ==
- List of bridges on the National Register of Historic Places in New Hampshire
- List of covered bridges in New Hampshire
- National Register of Historic Places listings in Merrimack County, New Hampshire
