= New Hampshire Telephone Museum =

American telecommunications museum

Coordinates: 43°16′47″N 71°48′54″W

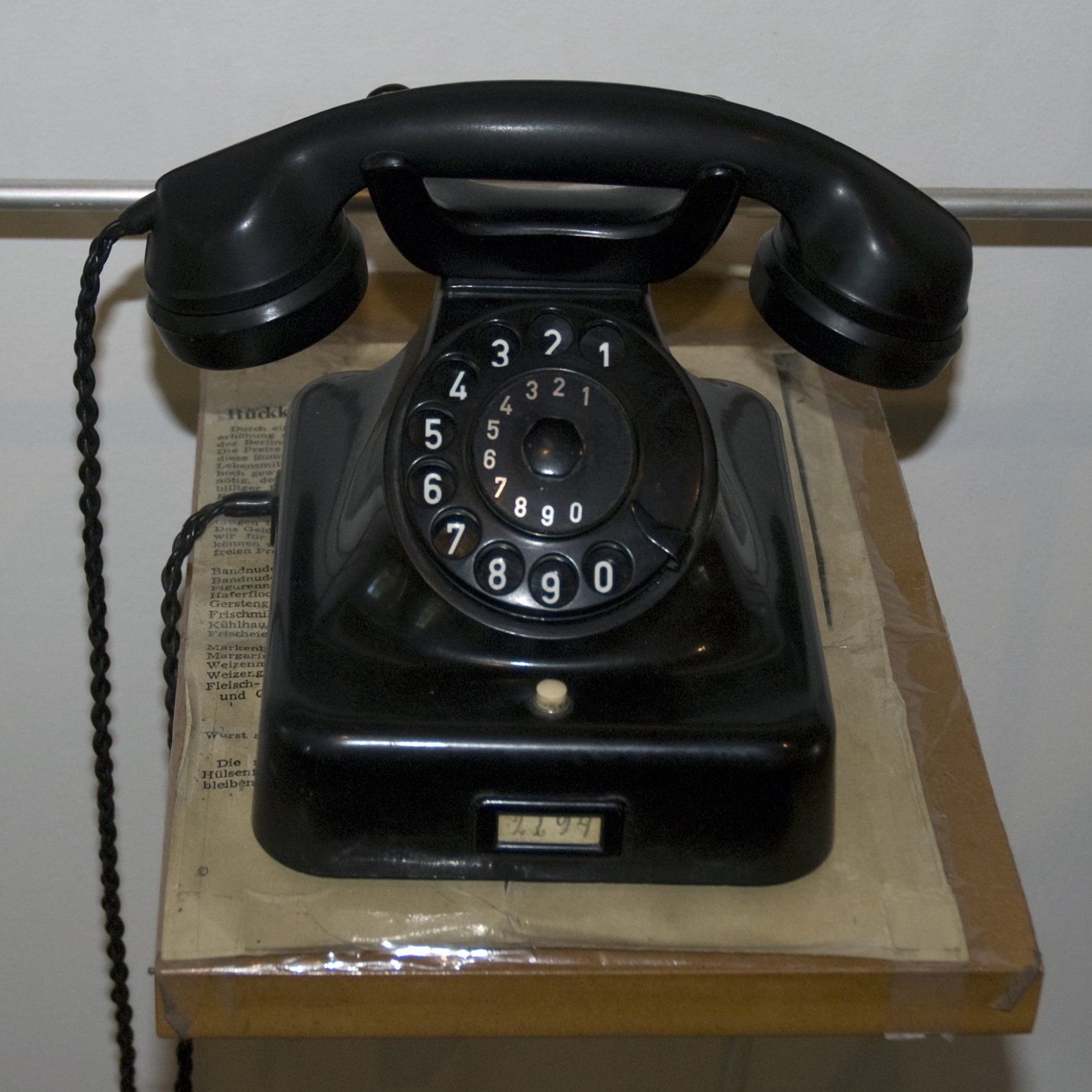
- Telephone
- Established: 2005
- Location: 1 Depot St, Warner NH 03278
- Type: History museum
- Collection size: 1000 exhibits
- Website: www.nhtelephonemuseum.org

The New Hampshire Telephone Museum is a nonprofit, telecommunications history museum in Warner, New Hampshire, in the United States. There are over 1,000 telephone-related artifacts in the museum. The museum features switchboards, a large display of rotary phones, candlestick telephones, wooden wall-mount phones, phone booths, princess phones, flip phones and smart devices. Public programs include guided tours, lectures, interactive displays suitable for all ages.

== History ==
The museum was established in 2005 by Dick and Paul Violette, of the Merrimack County Telephone Company. The museum received a grant from the Nancy Sibley Wilkins Town of Warner Trust Fund in 2013. The museum offers a history of telephone communication.
