= Waterloo Covered Bridge =

- U.S. National Register of Historic Places
- U.S. Historic district – Contributing property
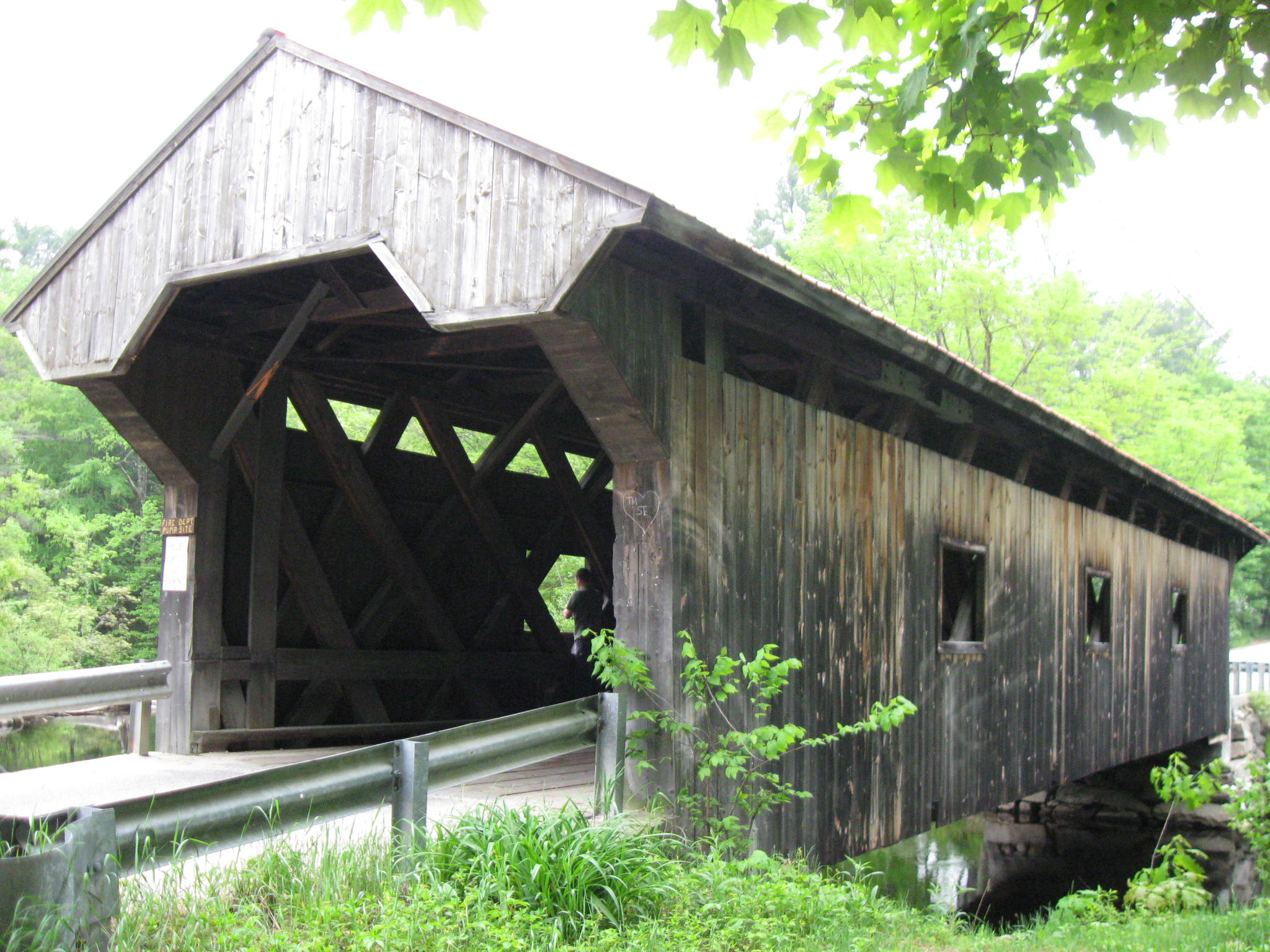

- Location within New Hampshire Location within the United States
- Location: Newmarket Rd., Waterloo, New Hampshire
- Coordinates: 43°17′16″N 71°51′27″W
- Area: 0.1 acres (0.040 ha)
- Built: 1859
- Architect: Woods, Dutton
- Architectural style: Town lattice truss
- Part of: Waterloo Historic District (ID03000926)
- NRHP reference No.: 76000130

Significant dates
- Added to NRHP: November 21, 1976
- Designated CP: September 13, 2003

The Waterloo Covered Bridge carries Newmarket Road over the Warner River near the Waterloo Falls in Warner, New Hampshire. The Town lattice truss bridge was built in 1859–60, replacing an earlier span at the same location, and is one of New Hampshire's few surviving 19th-century covered bridges. The bridge was listed on the National Register of Historic Places in 1976, and included in the Waterloo Historic District in 2003.

== Description and history ==
The Waterloo Covered Bridge is located in western Warner, spanning the Warner River in a roughly northeast–southwest orientation. The bridge is a single span with a span length of 76 feet 5 inches (23.29 m) and an overall length of 84 feet 5 inches (25.73 m). It rests on concrete foundations that were laid in 1970, during a major rehabilitation of the structure. The roadway is 13 feet 9 inches (4.19 m) wide (enough for a single lane of traffic), with a vertical clearance of 12 feet (3.7 m). The bridge is sheathed by vertical planking and topped by a corrugated metal gable roof. The planking does not quite reach the eave, leaving an open band just below the roof line, and each side has several square openings cut in it for additional lighting.

Newmarket Road was laid out by the town of Warner in 1839, suggesting a bridge was either built or already standing at this site at that time. The present bridge was likely built in 1860, when the town paid $473.65 for construction of the "Waterloo Bridge". The low price suggests that the abutments were probably repaired rather than rebuilt. The site of the bridge at the Waterloo Falls was adjacent to a number of industrial enterprises using the water power of the river and would have been an important feature of the village; all of these businesses failed and there are now only foundational remains.

== See also ==
- National Register of Historic Places listings in Merrimack County, New Hampshire
- List of New Hampshire covered bridges
- List of bridges on the National Register of Historic Places in New Hampshire
