= Lake Massasecum =

Lake in Merrimack County, New Hampshire

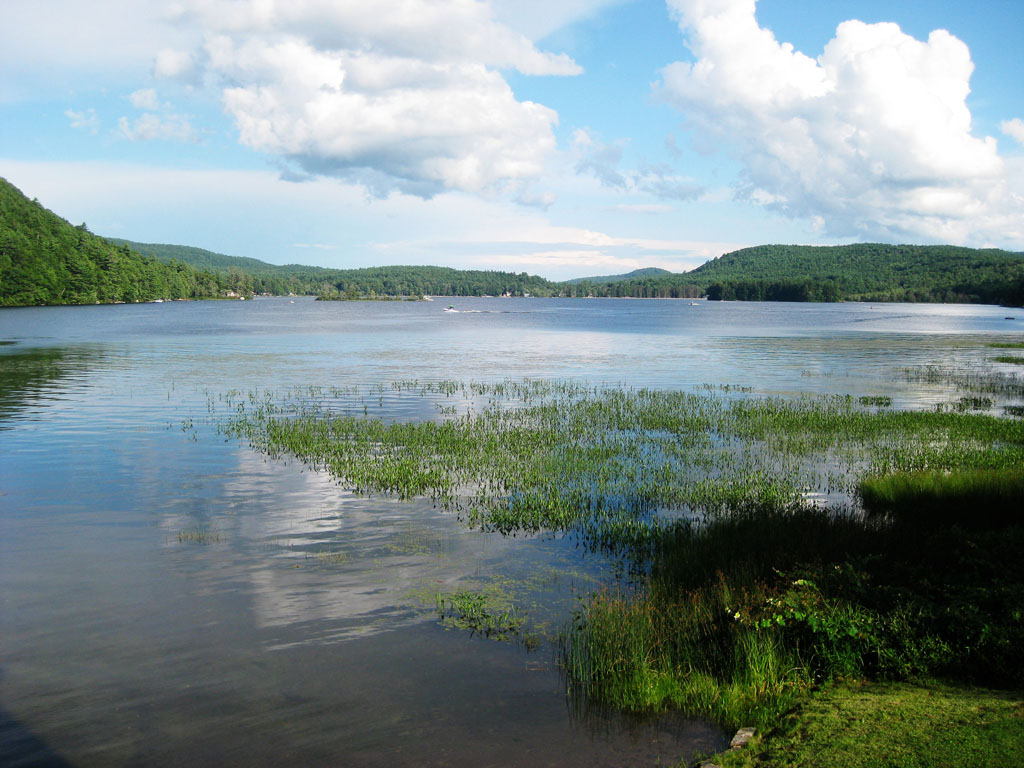
- North end of Lake Massasecum in midsummer

- Location within New Hampshire Location within the United States
- Location: Merrimack County, New Hampshire
- Coordinates: 43°14′41″N 71°54′54″W
- Primary outflows: tributary of Warner River
- Basin countries: United States
- Max. length: 1.5 mi (2.4 km)
- Max. width: 0.7 mi (1.1 km)
- Surface area: 409 acres (1.66 km^{2})
- Average depth: 10 ft (3.0 m)
- Max. depth: 50 ft (15 m)
- Surface elevation: 636.7 ft (194.1 m)
- Islands: 3
- Settlements: Bradford

Lake Massasecum is a 409-acre (1.66 km^{2}) water body located in Merrimack County in central New Hampshire, United States, in the town of Bradford. Outflow from the lake travels via the Warner River to the Contoocook River and then the Merrimack River.

The lake is classified as a warmwater fishery, with observed species including smallmouth and largemouth bass, black crappie, chain pickerel, and horned pout.

In the past decade there has been an increase in Myriophyllum (more commonly known as "milfoil") in the lake, and local residents have been trying to stop its spread.

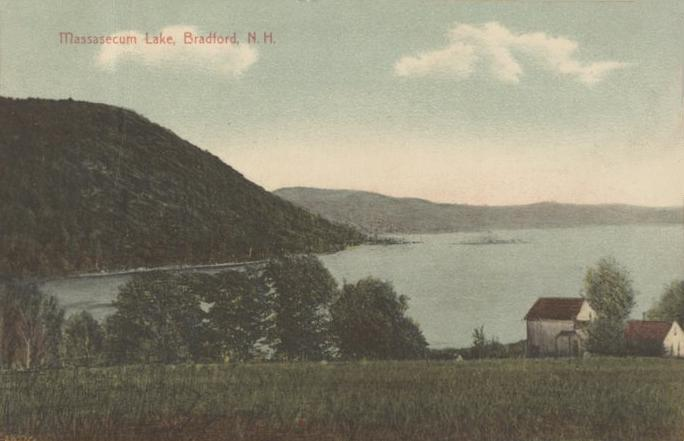
Postcard from c. 1908

== See also ==
- List of lakes in New Hampshire
