= Odds Bodkin =

American storyteller, musician, and author

Odds Bodkin (born February 14, 1953) is the pseudonym of an American storyteller, musician, and author who has published a number of spoken and/or musical interpretations of traditional tales, as well as a number of original tales and children's books. "Little Proto's T-Rex Adventure" was awarded the Parents' Choice Gold Award. Odds and his family live in Bradford, New Hampshire.

Bodkin tours both nationally and internationally, appearing at storytelling festivals, schools, universities, theaters and museums. He has performed at the White House and the National Storytelling Festival.

Bodkin projects include The Vanishers: The App that Brings Objects to Life, a story-based Alternative Reality Game (ARG) for museums and outdoor places, and Young Hercules: The Legendary Bully, an empathy-awareness program for middle, high school and college students.

Under the pseudonym "McKenzie Bodkin", Bodkin's original epic poem The Water Mage's Daughter: A Novel of Love, Magic and War in Verse was published as an ebook by Telemachus Press in 2013. Written in iambic tetrameter, the 13,000-line high fantasy novel features hidden verse games and mathematical structures.

== Published works ==
Odds Bodkin's many published works include:

- The Water Mage's Daughter: A Novel of Love, Magic and War in Verse (2013) ISBN 978-1-938701-09-2
- The Rage of Hercules (2001) ISBN 978-1-882412-32-7
- The Harper and the King
- The Evergreens: Gentle Tales of Nature
- Lifescapes: Stories of Love
- The Adventures of Little Proto
- Little Proto's T-Rex Adventure
- Little Proto and the Volcano's Fire
- With A Twinkle In Your Eye (1993) ISBN 978-1-882412-01-3
- Giants' Cauldron (1993) ISBN 978-1-882412-03-7
- Rip Roarin' Paul Bunyan Tales (1994) ISBN 978-1-882412-16-7
- The Odyssey (1995) ISBN 978-1-882412-18-1
- The Hidden Grail: Sir Percival and the Fisher King (1997) ISBN 978-1-882412-26-6
- The Winter Cherries (1994) ISBN 978-1-882412-14-3
- The Earthstone (1993) ISBN 978-1-882412-07-5
- Blossom Tree: Tales from the Far East
- Dark Tales of the Supernatural
- The Banshee Train (with Ted Rose) (1995) ISBN 978-0-395-69426-8
- The Christmas Cobwebs (2001) ISBN 978-0-15-201459-9
- Ghost of the Southern Belle ISBN 978-0-316-02608-6
- The Wise Little Girl (1993) ISBN 978-1-882412-02-0
- The Crane Wife (1998) ISBN 978-0-15-201407-0
- The Teacup Fairy (1993) ISBN 978-1-882412-00-6

== External sources ==
- Odds Bodkin Performs Live on Plum TV
