= Nellie George Stearns =

American artist and teacher of art

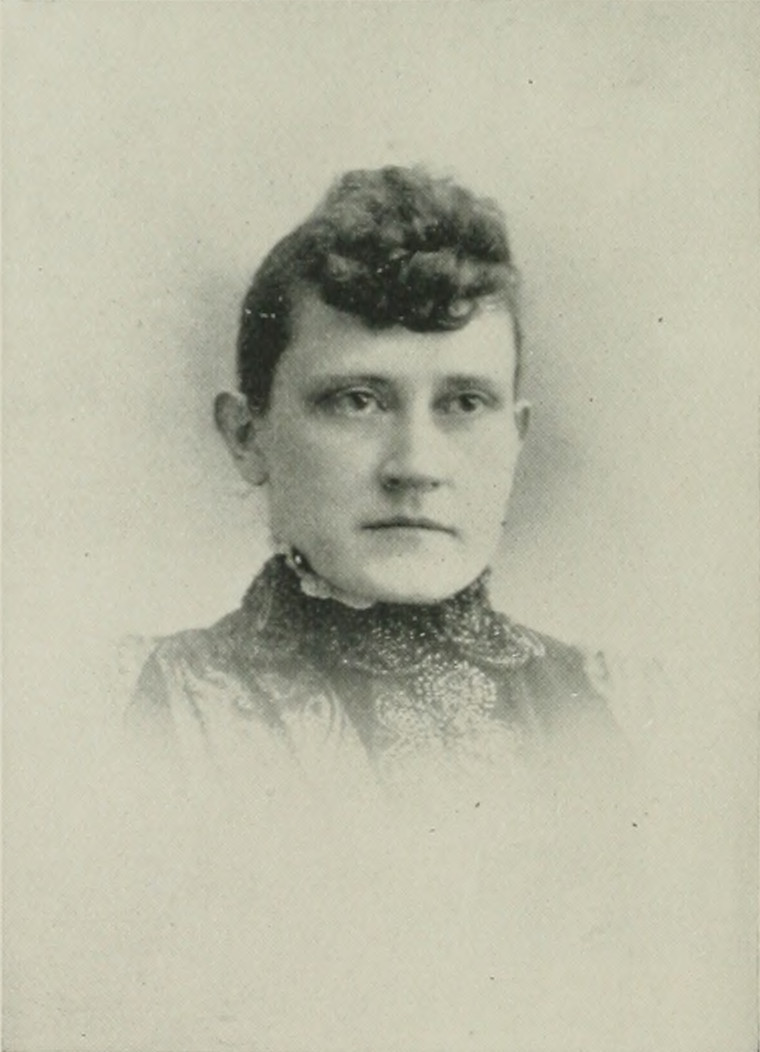
Nellie George Stearns, "A woman of the century"

Nellie George Stearns (July 10, 1855 – February 9, 1936) was an American artist and teacher of art. She taught and held exhibitions in the leading towns and cities of New England.

== Early years and education ==
Nellie George was born in Warner, New Hampshire, July 10, 1855. She was the daughter of Gilman C. and Nancy (Badger) George. Her siblings included sisters Mrs. Hannah Colby and Mrs. C. H. Bennett, and a brother, Frank G. George.

Stearns inherited from her mother an inclination toward art. Even in her childhood, she sketched as a constant amusement. Her parents engaged art tutors for her in their own home. Stearns was graduated with high honors from Simonds Free High School, Warner. She took a thorough course in the Boston Museum of Fine Arts, and later studied portrait painting with Mr. Emilie Lonigo, where she gained a wide knowledge regarding technique.

== Career ==
After leaving school, she taught art in its various branches for several years. Her summers were devoted to classes throughout the New England States. During the season of 1891, she had charge of the art department in the Chautauqua Assembly of East Epping, New Hampshire.

Stearns' favored form of painting was the human face and form. Her painting of The Great Rid Pipe Stone Quarry, a scene immortalized in Henry Wadsworth Longfellow's The Song of Hiawatha, was exhibited in the World Cotton Centennial of New Orleans in 1884, and at the World's Columbian Exposition of Chicago in 1893. She also painted a portrait of Governor Nehemiah G. Ordway, which was hung in the Pittsburg, New Hampshire Library.

At Warner, on December 24, 1882, she married George Frederic Stearns. From 1894, they made their home in Boston, and her studio was located there as well. She was a member of the Order of the Eastern Star. By religion, she was a Congregationalist. Stearns died February 9, 1936, in Warner, New Hampshire, and is buried in that city's Pine Grove Cemetery.
