= Caroline Gardner Bartlett =

American singer

Caroline G. Bartlett
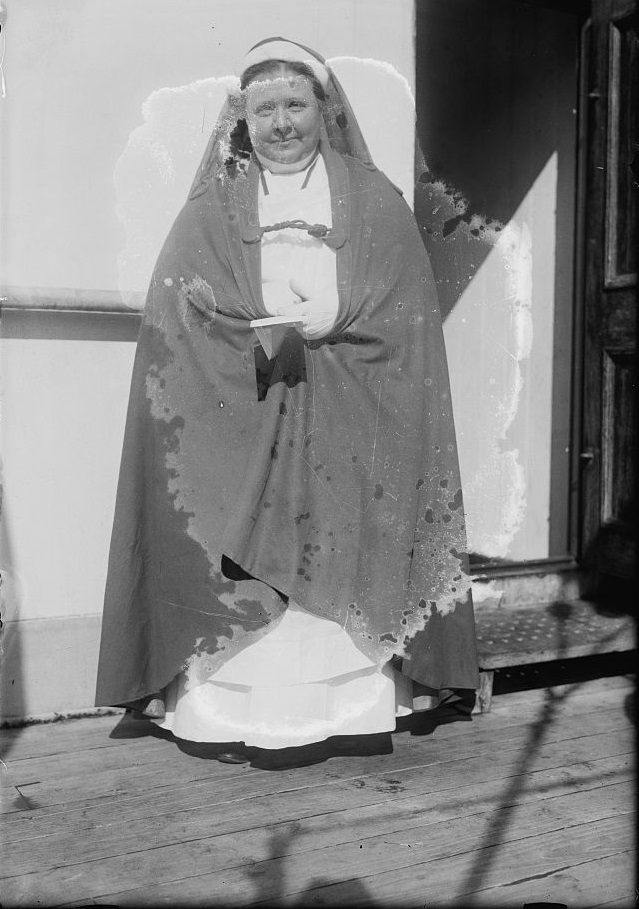
- Caroline Gardner Bartlett in her "Sister Beatrice" garb, c.1915

Background information
- Birth name: Caroline Gardner (or Gott)
- Born: 1868; Ohio, U.S.
- Origin: Boston Conservatory
- Died: 1938 (aged 69–70)
- Genres: classical
- Occupation(s): Singer, vocal educator, war relief
- Years active: 1890-1920

Caroline Gardner Bartlett (1868–1938) was an American soprano, a music educator, and (as "Sister Beatrice") a relief worker during World War I.

== Early life ==
Caroline Gardner (or Gott) was born in Ohio, and raised by adoptive parents named Clark in Rochester, New York. She studied voice in the United States and in Europe, especially at the Boston Conservatory. Her skills as a vocal educator were renowned; opera singer Lillian Nordica sought her advice, and Thomas Edison met with her to discuss technologies involving the voice. In 1904 she began teaching music at her own school, Sunny Hill, in Warner, New Hampshire. She also toured, giving recitals, to some acclaim.

== World War I and aftermath ==
At the outbreak of World War I, Bartlett found herself in England, unable to return to the United States. She threw herself into relief work, and along the way, took the name "Sister Beatrice", complete with a nun's habit. There was nothing particularly religious about this choice of persona; she explained only that it made her service role clearer in the chaos of wartime France.

At Yvetot, working with the French army's sanitary service, Bartlett created a hospital from a deserted building in need of indoor plumbing, electrical wiring, and heat. The hospital treated hundreds of French wounded, many of them African soldiers. As the hospital thrived, Bartlett resigned from her administrative duties for reasons unclear, then embarked on a popular lecture tour to raise further funds for war relief.

Rumors began during Bartlett's lectures in Canada that she was a German spy, and that her frequent crossings of the English Channel were for espionage, not humanitarian relief. Variations on the rumor had her stealing from the donations she raised. As an independent actor in France, unaffiliated with the Red Cross or any other relief organization, she had no institutional credentials, and no one to vouch for her activities. She was never arrested, but the rumors continued to haunt Bartlett for the rest of her life. Several US State Department officials gave statements clearing Bartlett, in the years following the war; but her health and career were damaged by the accusations, and she died at a sanitarium in Warner, New Hampshire, in 1938, aged 70, with less than a hundred dollars in her bank account.

In 2004, MainStreet Warner, Inc. produced a play titled Minta, loosely based on Caroline Gardner Bartlett's life. Written by Leah Burdick using Bartlett's autobiography and personal letters, the play was inspired by a profile in The New Hampshire Century. In the play the ghost of Lillian Nordica leads Bartlett on a journey to revisit defining moments of her past in order to help the audience "better see this largely misunderstood woman."

== Personal life ==
Caroline Gardner Bartlett was married once, to a Canadian-born dentist named James Bartlett, in 1898; she was 30 years old, and he was 66. The Bartletts did not have children. James Bartlett died in 1909, and left Caroline with a comfortable inheritance and a British passport. She did not remarry.

== Sources ==
- Felice Belman, "Caroline Gardner Bartlett," The New Hampshire Century: "Concord Monitor" Profiles of One Hundred People Who Shaped It, Felice Belman and Mike Pride, eds. (University Press of New England 2008): 117–123.
- "Sister Beatrice in French Hospital; Boston Woman Cousin of George B. Kemp; Friend of Lillian Nordica," Watertown [NY] Daily Times (July 12, 1915): p. 33.
- "'Sister Beatrice' Accused: Mrs. Caroline Bartlett Called a German Spy," New York Times (September 4, 1915): p. 7.
- "Distrusted Mrs. Bartlett: Canadian Police Dogged Her, Thinking Her a German Spy," New York Times (December 5, 1915): p. 6.
- "Sister Beatrice's Record: What a Patriotic Woman Can Do," Ovens and Murray Advertiser (Beechworth, Victoria)(September 18, 1915): p. 5.
- "Sister Beatrice Coming: Will Appeal for Hospital Supplies for French Soldiers," Brooklyn Daily Eagle (February 1, 1916): p. 5.
- The Thomas Edison Papers, New Hampshire Historical Society, Concord NH, Folder X181, contains eight letters pertaining to Caroline Gardner Bartlett's connections to Nordica and Edison.
