= West Branch Warner River =

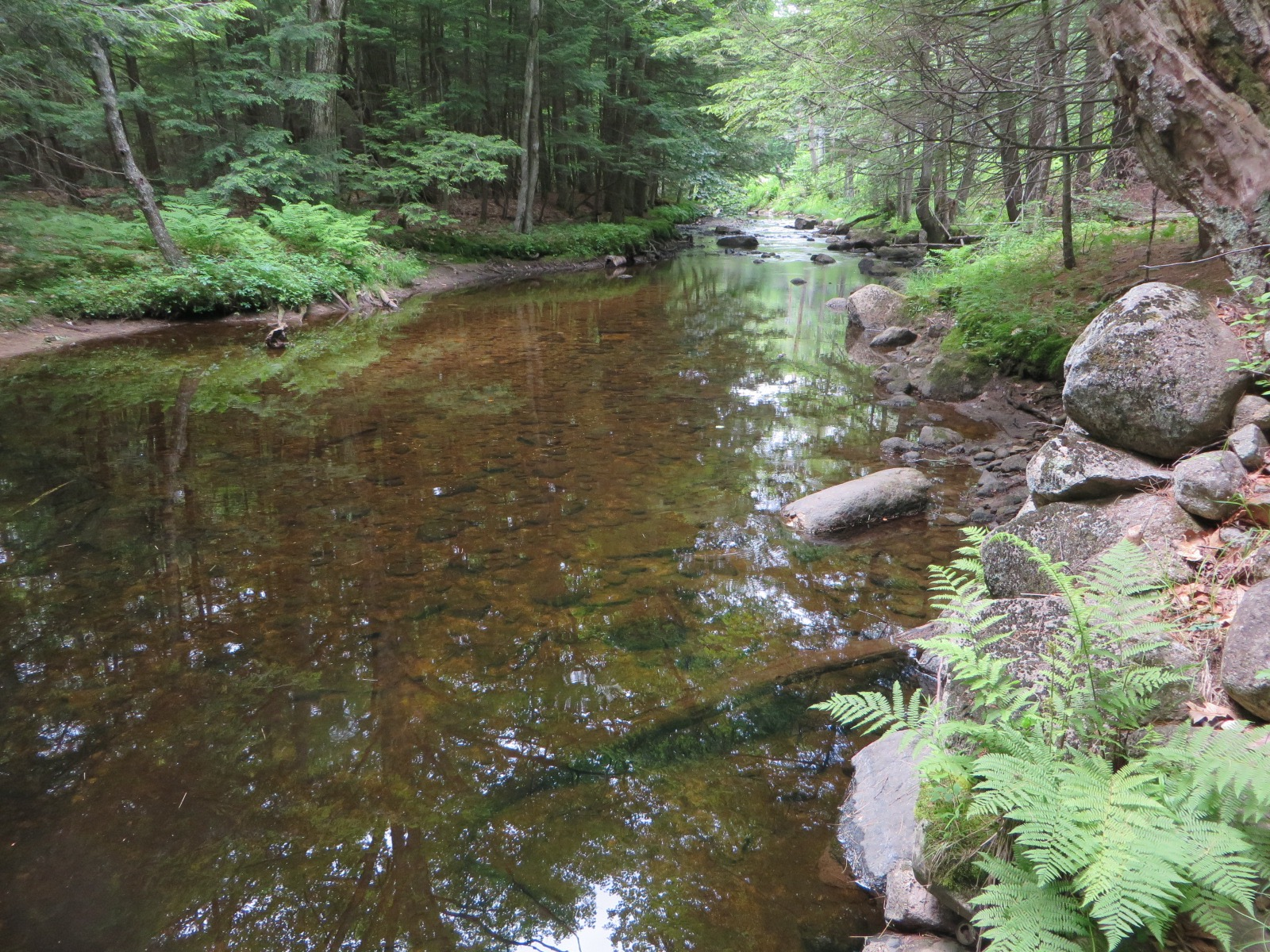
- The West Branch along Fairgrounds Road in Bradford, NH

- Location within New Hampshire Location within the United States

Location
- Country: United States
- State: New Hampshire
- County: Merrimack
- Towns: Newbury, Bradford

Physical characteristics
- Source: Mount Sunapee
  - location: Newbury
  - coordinates: 43°14′45″N 72°3′28″W
  - elevation: 1,614 ft (492 m)
- Mouth: Warner River
  - location: Bradford
  - coordinates: 43°16′5″N 71°57′55″W
  - elevation: 650 ft (200 m)
- Length: 6.5 mi (10.5 km)

The West Branch of the Warner River is a 6.5-mile-long (10.5 km) river in central New Hampshire in the United States. It is a tributary of the Warner River, part of the Contoocook River (and ultimately Merrimack River) watershed.

The West Branch rises in the southwest corner of Newbury, New Hampshire, on the eastern slopes of Mount Sunapee. Flowing east, it quickly enters the town of Bradford, reaching the Warner River at the town center.

== See also ==
- List of rivers of New Hampshire
