= Lower Warner Meetinghouse =

Historic church in New Hampshire, United States

- U.S. National Register of Historic Places
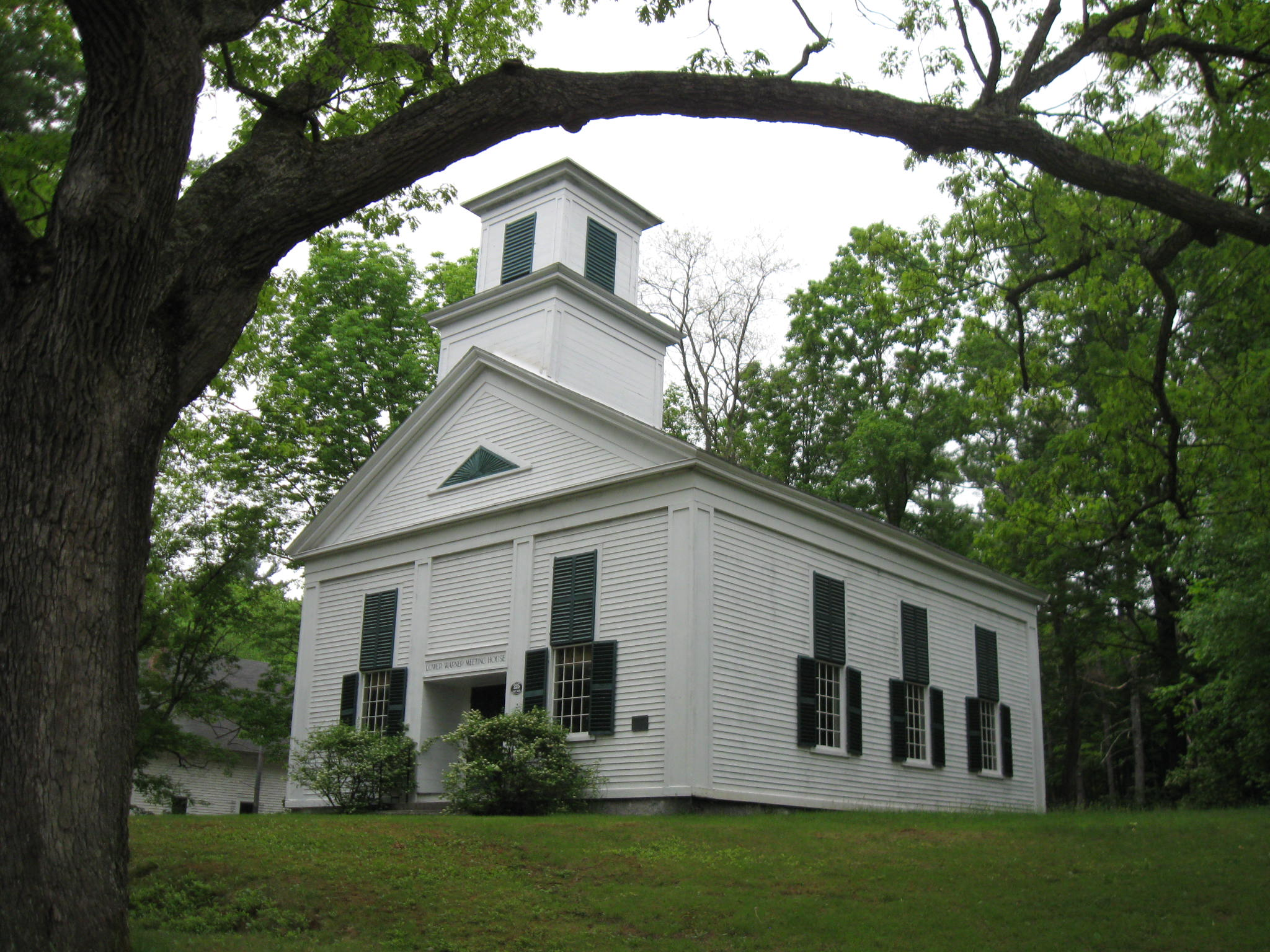

- Location within New Hampshire Location within the United States
- Location: NH 103, Warner, New Hampshire
- Coordinates: 43°16′28″N 71°47′57″W
- Area: less than one acre
- Built: 1844
- Architectural style: Greek Revival
- NRHP reference No.: 89000450
- Added to NRHP: May 25, 1989

The Lower Warner Meetinghouse is a historic meetinghouse at 232 East Main Street (NH 103) in Warner, New Hampshire. Built in 1844–45, it is a little-altered example of a 19th-century Greek Revival church, which has retained nearly all of its original interior elements, as well as its exterior except for the steeple, lost to a lightning strike c. 1893. It was listed on the National Register of Historic Places in 1989.

== Description and history ==
The Lower Warner Meetinghouse is located in a rural setting in eastern Warner, on the north side of NH 103 west of its junction with Schoodac Road. It is a 1 1/2-story wood-frame structure, with a gabled roof and clapboarded exterior. Its main facade is three bays wide, with a recessed center entry framed by a pair of 20/20 sash windows. The entry is flanked by paneled boards, which are repeated on the corners, which rise to a triangular gabled pediment, whose tympanum contains a small triangular louver. Above the entry a two-stage square tower rises. The side walls each have three 20/20 sash windows. The interior has retained much of its original finish, although pews have been removed or rearranged. It has its original pulpit, lighting fixtures, and stove, as well as its original pulpit Bible.

The first meetinghouse to stand near this site was built in 1789. In the 1840s, the congregation decided to move to Centre Village, further to the west. Opponents of this decision split from the congregation and decided to build a new structure here. How exactly the local Methodist congregation came to be involved in the building is uncertain, but they were also using the building by 1846. The building was used by both Congregationalists and Methodists until the 1860s, at which time it was abandoned. It was informally maintained by abutters until a significant restoration was begun in 1897 after the loss of the steeple. In 1969 the building was given to the Warner Historical Society.

== See also ==
- National Register of Historic Places listings in Merrimack County, New Hampshire
