= Bradford (CDP), New Hampshire =

Census-designated place in New Hampshire, United States

Bradford, New Hampshire
- Census-designated place
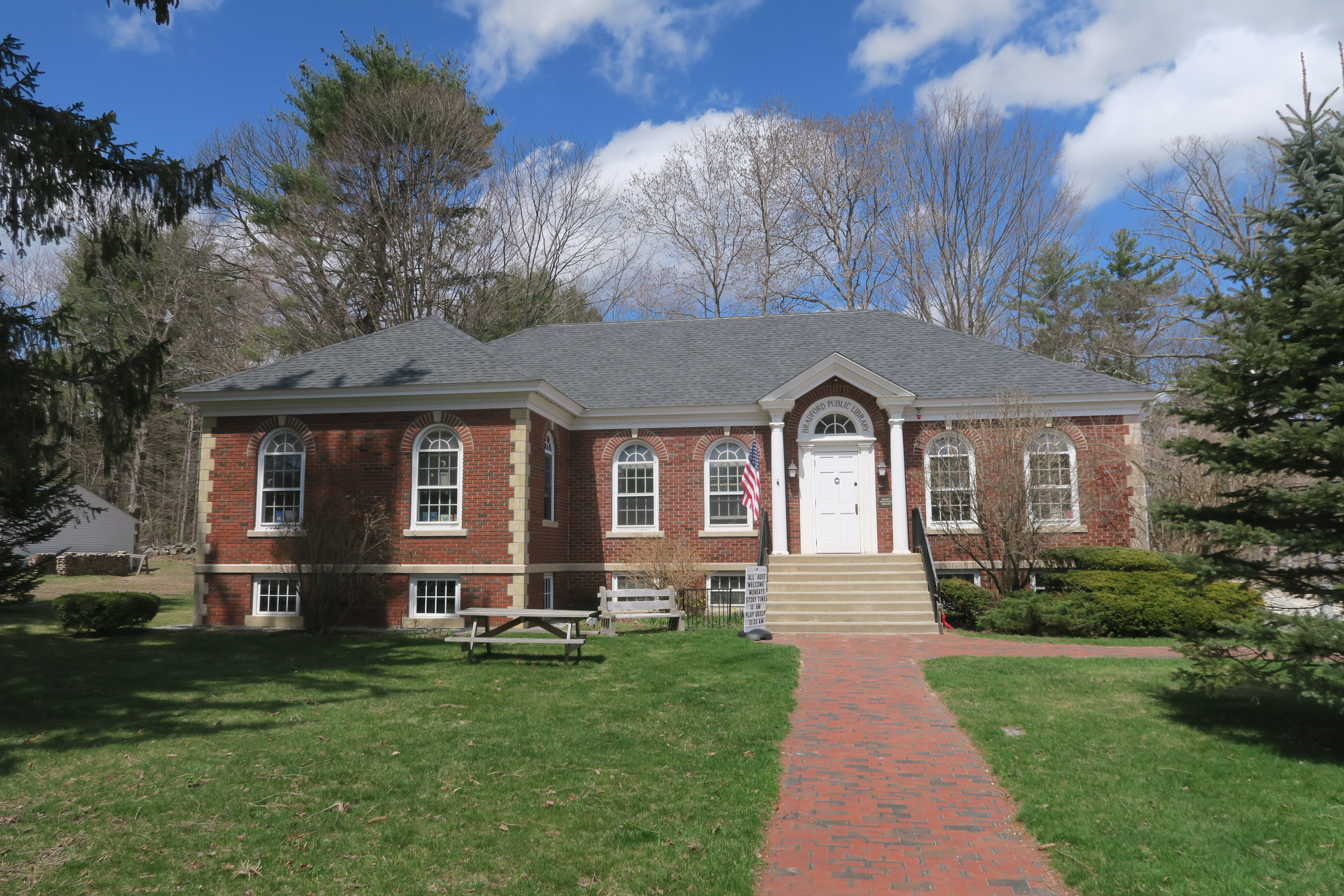
- Bradford Public Library

- Location within New Hampshire Location within the United States
- Coordinates: 43°16′17″N 71°57′44″W
- Country: United States
- State: New Hampshire
- County: Merrimack
- Town: Bradford

Area
  - Total: 0.81 sq mi (2.10 km^{2})
  - Land: 0.80 sq mi (2.06 km^{2})
  - Water: 0.015 sq mi (0.04 km^{2})
- Elevation: 705 ft (215 m)

Population (2020)
  - Total: 372
  - Density: 468.5/sq mi (180.87/km^{2})
- Time zone: UTC-5 (Eastern (EST))
  - Summer (DST): UTC-4 (EDT)
- ZIP code: 03221
- Area code: 603
- FIPS code: 33-06900
- GNIS feature ID: 2629717

Bradford is a census-designated place (CDP) and the main village in the town of Bradford, New Hampshire, United States. The population of the CDP was 372 at the 2020 census, out of 1,662 in the entire town.

== Geography ==
The CDP occupies the northeastern part of the town of Bradford, at the outlet of Todd Lake. The northern border of the CDP follows the Bradford/Newbury town line, while the southern boundary follows the Warner River and its West Branch. The CDP is bordered to the east by New Hampshire Route 114. Route 114 leads north 12 miles (19 km) to New London and southeast 9 miles (14 km) to Henniker. New Hampshire Route 103 passes through the center of the CDP, leading east 7 miles (11 km) to Interstate 89 in Warner and northwest 13 miles (21 km) to Newport.

According to the U.S. Census Bureau, the Bradford CDP has a total area of 0.81 square miles (2.1 km^{2}), of which 0.02 square miles (0.04 km^{2}), or 1.98%, are water.

== Demographics ==
Historical population
Census	Pop.	Note	%±
2010	356		—
2020	372		4.5%
U.S. Decennial Census

As of the census of 2010, there were 356 people, 144 households, and 97 families residing in the CDP. There were 174 housing units, of which 30, or 17.2%, were vacant. 14 of the vacant units were seasonal or vacation properties. The racial makeup of the CDP was 95.2% white, 0.3% African American, 1.4% Native American, 0.6% Asian, 0.0% Pacific Islander, 0.3% some other race, and 2.2% from two or more races. 2.2% of the population were Hispanic or Latino of any race.

Of the 144 households in the CDP, 26.4% had children under the age of 18 living with them, 48.6% were headed by married couples living together, 11.8% had a female householder with no husband present, and 32.6% were non-families. 22.2% of all households were made up of individuals, and 7.0% were someone living alone who was 65 years of age or older. The average household size was 2.47, and the average family size was 2.88.

21.1% of residents in the CDP were under the age of 18, 9.8% were from age 18 to 24, 21.1% were from 25 to 44, 36.5% were from 45 to 64, and 11.5% were 65 years of age or older. The median age was 43.4 years. For every 100 females, there were 95.6 males. For every 100 females age 18 and over, there were 103.6 males.

For the period 2011–15, the estimated median annual income for a household was $54,583, and the median income for a family was $63,438. The per capita income for the CDP was $21,501. 9.7% of the population and 8.8% of families were below the poverty line, along with 16.2% of people under the age of 18 and 6.8% of people 65 or older.
