= Will Cressy =

- Born: Will Martin Cressy; October 29, 1863; Bradford, New Hampshire, U.S.
- Died: May 7, 1930 (aged 66); St. Petersburg, Florida, U.S.
- Occupations: Vaudeville actor; comedian; playwright; memoirist
- Years active: 1889-1920s
- Spouse: Blanche Dayne

Will Martin Cressy (October 29, 1863 – May 7, 1930) was an American vaudeville actor, comedian, writer and playwright.

== Life and career ==
He was born in Bradford, New Hampshire, where his father ran an animal feed business, and was educated in Concord. He started work as a traveling salesman, and acted in amateur shows before starting his career in the theatre. His first professional stage appearance was in 1889, as a member of the Frost & Fanshawe touring company. In 1890 he married another member of the company, Blanche Dayne.

For six years Cressy worked with Denman Thompson in The Old Homestead theatre company, playing the part of Cy Prime. Cressy and Dayne then debuted in vaudeville in 1898. The couple performed and toured widely, working mainly in B. F. Keith's theaters. They became one of the most popular and highly paid vaudeville acts of the period between the 1890s and 1920s, and toured internationally as well as within the U.S.. Cressy wrote all their comedic sketches, which included "Grasping an Opportunity", "A Village Lawyer", and "The Wyoming Whoop". Most were based on true incidents recalled from his early years in a small New Hampshire town. A biographical sketch in 1919 said of Cressy: "Not only is he a master in his line as an actor and entertainer, but he undoubtedly leads the world as an author of vaudeville sketches, or one act plays, having produced about one hundred and fifty, and is credited with having written about half of all the playlets now being presented in vaudeville."

During the First World War, Cressy donated much time to entertaining groups of orphans. He was heavily involved in fund-raising drives in support of the war effort, and was one of the "Four Minute Men" appointed by U.S. President Woodrow Wilson to speak to audience on patriotic subjects. In August 1918, he and Dayne traveled to France as part of the Overseas Theatre League, leading the first American company to entertain troops. While there, he was severely injured and suffered permanent damage as the result of a mustard gas explosion. The pair were among the first to enter Verdun after the signing of the armistice.

Cressy and Dayne built a house for themselves at Blodgetts Landing, New Hampshire, where they entertained many leading show business personalities of the time and contributed to the local community. They spent much time traveling around by motor car. Cressy wrote a number of humorous books about their travels and other anecdotes, as well as many newspaper articles. The couple also had a winter home in St. Petersburg, Florida.

Cressy died in St. Petersburg in 1930, at the age of 66. He was buried with military honors at Pleasant Hill Cemetery, Bradford, New Hampshire.

== Bibliography ==
- Summer Days with Will Cressy and Blanche Dayne (1909)
- The Hills O' Hampshire (with James Clarence Harvey, 1913)
- Continuous Vaudeville (1914)
- At the End of the Road (1923)
