= H. Maria George Colby =

American writer

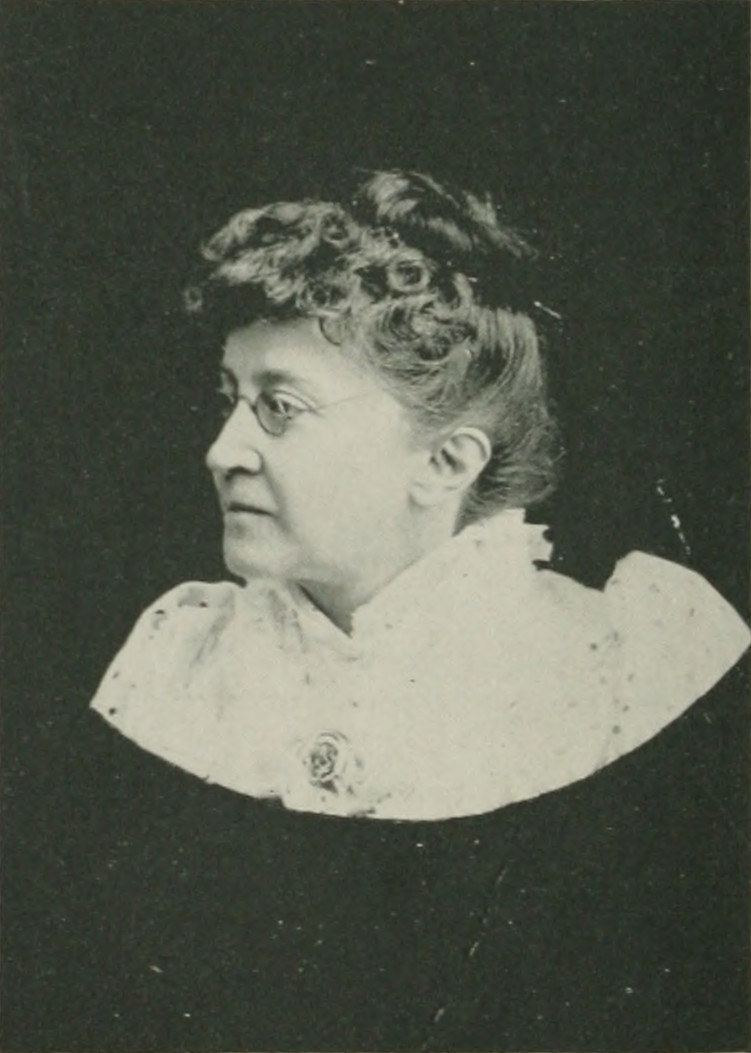
- Photo in A Woman of the Century
- Born: Hannah Maria George; October 1, 1844; Warner, New Hampshire, U.S.
- Died: March 29, 1910 (aged 65); Warner
- Occupations: writer; newspaper editor; social leader
- Spouse: Frederick Myron Colby (m. 1882)
- Relatives: Adelaide George Bennett (sister)
- Writing career
- Pen name: Clinton Montague; H. M. G.; H. Maria George
- Genres: novelettes, juvenile literature
- Subject: domestic topics

H. Maria George Colby (née, George; pen names, Clinton Montague, H. M. G., and H. Maria George; October 1, 1844 – March 29, 1910) was an American writer, newspaper editor, and social leader of the long nineteenth century. She served as fashion editor of the Household and her articles appeared in various publications. Of Colby's various pen names, the best known was "H. Maria George".

== Early life and education ==
Hannah Maria George was born in Warner, New Hampshire, October 1, 1844. Her parents were Gilman C. and Nancy Badger George. Gilman, born in 1820, died September 12, 1894, was a son of James and Hannah (Church) George, and a descendant of James George, who settled in Haverhill, Massachusetts, in 1653. He was a captain in the state militia in 1843–44, town clerk from 1868 to 1872, and selectman from 1885 to 1888. He was master of Warner Grange, president of the Kearsarge Agricultural Association, and was the first worshipful master of Harris Lodge, No. 91, Ancient Free and Accepted Masons, of Warner. Colby was of English descent on both sides of the family and inherited literary talents from ancestors connected with Daniel Webster.

== Career ==
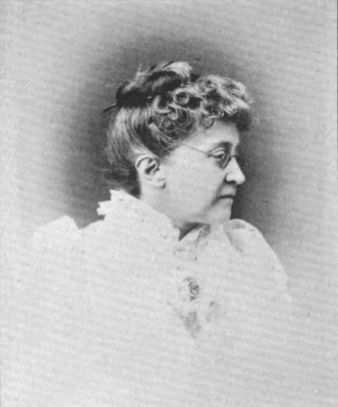
Colby in New Hampshire Women

While in her teens, she wrote a number of novelettes that were published in New York City and Philadelphia. Later, she wrote considerably for juvenile publications, and she was also an acknowledged authority regarding domestic topics. Her articles appeared in the Housewife, Housekeeper, Housekeeper's Weekly, Christian at Work, Demorest's Monthly Magazine, Arthur's Lady's Home Magazine, The Youth's Companion, the Congregationalist, the Portland Transcript, Ladles' World, Good Cheer, The Philadelphia Press, the Chicago Ledger, the Golden Rule, the Household, Good Housekeeping and St. Nicholas Magazine. For five years, she served as fashion editor of the "Household." A staunch advocate of temperance and equal rights for both sexes, she furthered these through her writing. Colby used various pen names, including "H. M. G." (in art and biographical sketches contributed to various periodicals) and "Clinton Montague", her best known literary name was her maiden name, "H. Maria George".

== Personal life ==
She married Frederick Myron Colby on December 24, 1882. They resided in Warner, and she died there on March 29, 1910.

== Selected works ==
=== Non-fiction ===
- 1885, "The Medieval Housewife"
- 1885, "The Pets of Noted Persons"
- 1885, "The Home of Juliet and Romeo"
- 1888, "The City of the White Swan"
- 1888, "A Notable Place"

=== Short stories ===
- 1882, "Hermann the Brave"
- 1905, "The Old Widow and Her Cat"

=== Poems ===
- 1901, "Then we shall see"
- 1906, "Bring out the flag: Memorial Day poem"
