= Adelaide George Bennett =

American poet and botanist (1848–1911)

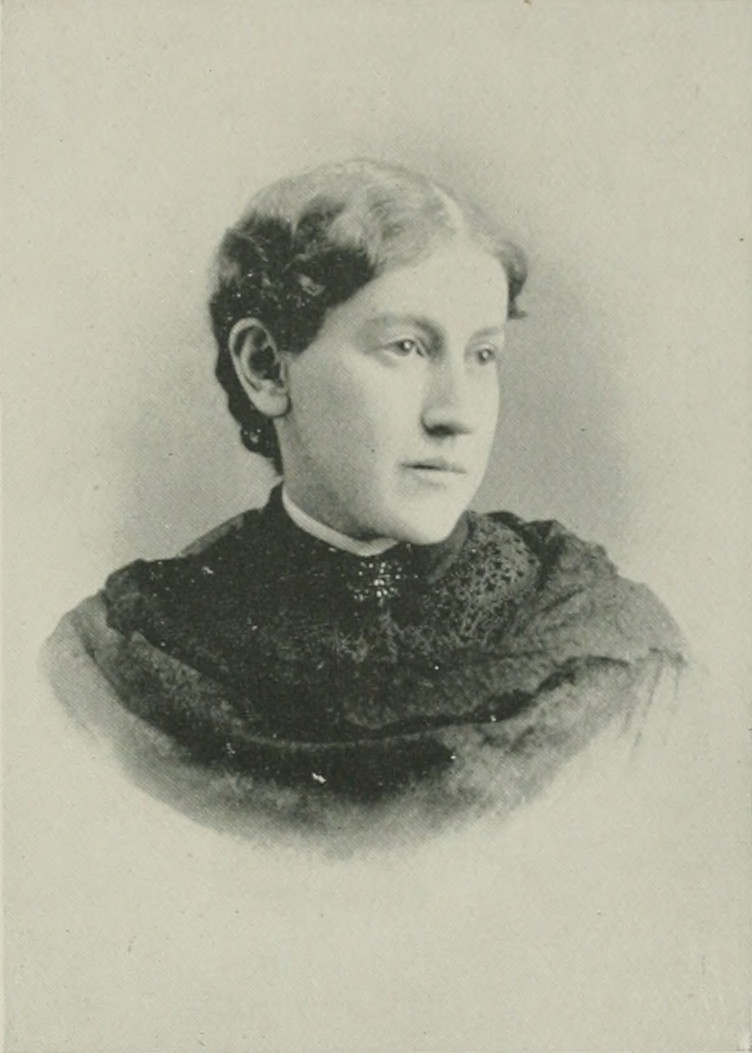
- Portrait photo in A Woman of the Century
- Born: Adelaide George; November 8, 1848; Warner, New Hampshire, U.S.
- Died: October 10, 1911 (aged 62); Pipestone, Minnesota, U.S.
- Resting place: Old Woodlawn Cemetery, Pipestone, Minnesota
- Education: Contoocook Academy, Contoocook, New Hampshire
- Occupations: teacher; poet; botanist
- Spouse: Charles H. Bennett (m. 1887)
- Relatives: H. Maria George Colby (sister)
- Writing career
- Language: English
- Subjects: Native American life; Red Pipestone Quarry

Adelaide George Bennett (née, George; November 8, 1848 – October 10, 1911) was an American teacher, poet, and botanist of the long nineteenth century. She is remembered for her poems which described Native American life and the Red Pipestone Quarry.

== Early life and education ==
Adelaide George was born in Warner, New Hampshire, November 8, 1848. Her childhood was passed near Kearsarge Mountain. Her parents were Gilman C. (1820-1894) and Nancy B. George. A sister, H. Maria George Colby, was well known in literary circles. The sisters inherited literary talents from ancestors connected with Daniel Webster. The father, Gilman, was a son of James and Hannah (Church) George, and a descendant of James George, who settled in Haverhill, Massachusetts, in 1653. He was a captain in the state militia in 1843–44, town clerk from 1868 to 1872, and selectman from 1885 to 1888. He was master of Warner Grange, president of the Kearsarge Agricultural Association, and was the first worshipful master of Harris Lodge, No. 91, Ancient Free and Accepted Masons, of Warner.

Bennett was educated in Contoocook Academy in Contoocook, New Hampshire and under private tutors.

== Career ==
Bennett taught several years in the public schools of Manchester, New Hampshire.

Bennett began writing poems for the press after her marriage. When she did write for publication, it was at the behest of her husband. She had quite a reputation throughout the West for the writing and rendition of poems on public occasions. Possessing rare qualifications for literary work, she has principally confined herself to poetry. She has an elegant prose style, as is shown in her correspondence and a number of fugitive newspaper and magazine articles.

As an amateur botanist, during the season of 1883, she made a collection of the flora of the Pipestone region for Prof. Newton Horace Winchell's report on the botanical resources of Minnesota. At the request of Winchell, that collection was exhibited in the New Orleans World Cotton Centennial in 1884.

Bennett was an active member of the Woman's Relief Corps, and during 1888–89, she held the office of National Inspector of Minnesota. She served as president of Simon Mix corps.

== Personal life ==
It was the fascinating glamour of legend, woven into poetry by Henry Wadsworth Longfellow in his "Song of Hiawatha", which led Adelaide to covet a piece of the "blood-red mystic stone" for her cabinet of geological curiosities. She wrote to the postmaster of Pipestone, Minnesota, then a town surveyed within the precincts of the quarry, requesting a specimen of the stone. The specimen was forwarded to her by Charles Bennett, accompanied by a set of views of the quarry and surrounding region. A correspondence and acquaintance followed, which resulted in their marriage, October 1887. On their bridal tour, while calling upon Longfellow, they informed him that he had unwittingly been a matchmaker.

Bennett died October 10, 1911, in Pipestone, and was buried in that city's Old Woodlawn Cemetery.
