= Blanche Dayne =

American actress

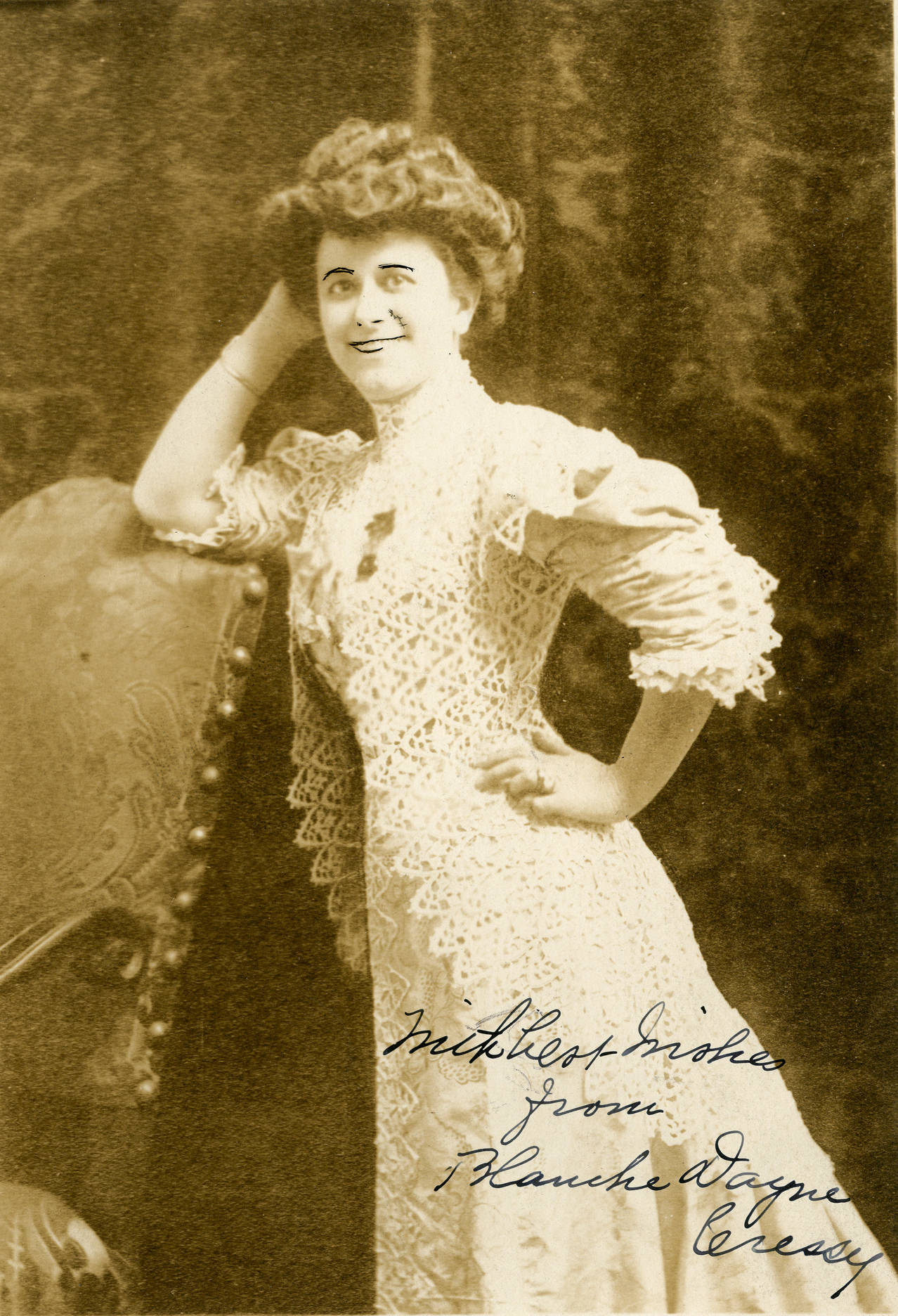
- Blanche Dayne, from a 1910 publicity photo.
- Born: December 25, 1871; Troy, New York
- Died: June 27, 1944; Hackensack, New Jersey
- Other names: Blanche Dayne Cressy
- Occupation: Actress

Blanche M. Dayne (December 25, 1871 – June 27, 1944) was an American actress in vaudeville, often in a duo team with her husband, Will M. Cressy.

== Early life ==
Dayne was born in Troy, New York on Christmas Day in 1871; she was on the stage from an early age.

== Career ==
She appeared in one Broadway show, A Village Lawyer (1908), and in one silent film, Fifty Dollars a Kiss (1915). Other stage credits were roles in vaudeville comedy sketches, including The Old Homestead, Grasping an Opportunity, The Key of C, Bill Biffin's Baby, The New Depot, Town Hall To-night, and The Wyoming Whoop. In 1898, she appeared with A. F. Fanshawe in the sketches A False Life, The Country Postmaster, An American Beauty, and Asa Jenkins.

She and her husband were Cressy & Dayne, a popular vaudeville comedy act from the 1890s into the 1920s. They were described as "among the highest-salaried players in vaudeville to-day" in a 1909 account. The couple published Summer Days with Will Cressy and Blanche Dayne, a photo book of their summer travels, including their home in New Hampshire, their automobile tour through California, and photographs they took on a world driving tour in 1910. They entertained troops in France during World War I, with the Overseas Theater League, and were the first entertainers to enter Verdun after the Armistice. Will Cressy's health was permanently damaged by exposure to chemical gas during their time in France.

In 1921, Blanche Dayne Cressy was made "an honorary Rotarian" by the Rotary Club of Providence, Rhode Island (women were not admitted to Rotary membership at the time).

== Personal life ==
Dayne married Will M. Cressy, a writer and fellow vaudevillian, in 1890. He died in 1930. She died in 1944, at her sister's home in Hackensack, New Jersey, aged 72 years.
