= Bradford, New Hampshire =

- Town
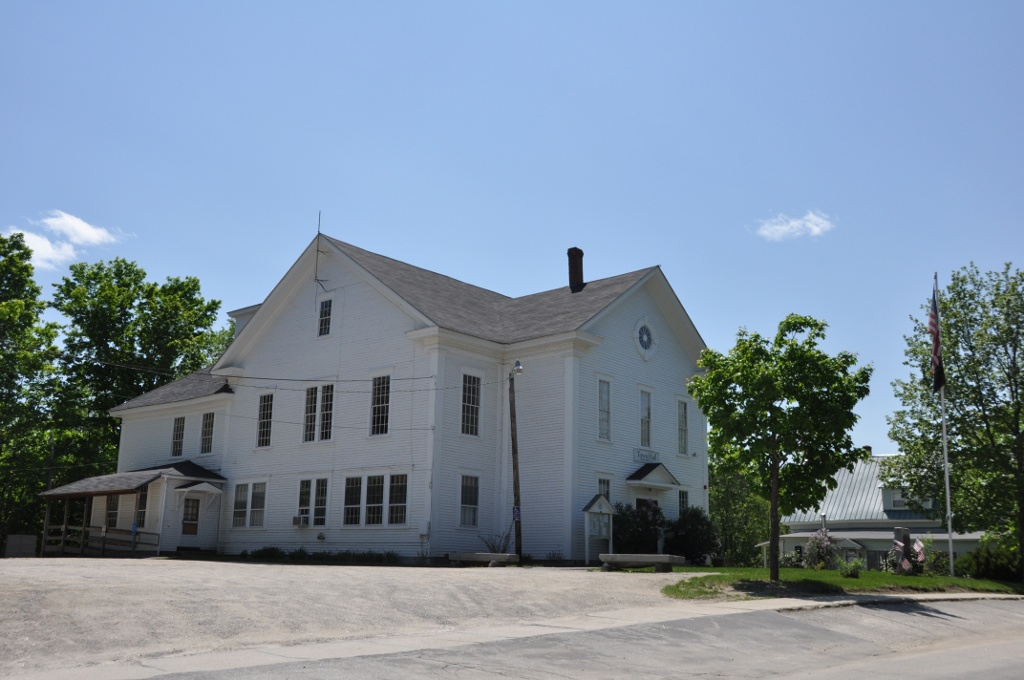
- Bradford Town Hall

- Seal

- Location in Merrimack County and the state of New Hampshire.
- Coordinates: 43°14′07″N 71°58′08″W
- Country: United States
- State: New Hampshire
- County: Merrimack
- Incorporated: 1787
- Villages: Bradford; Bradford Center

Area
  - Total: 35.9 sq mi (93.1 km^{2})
  - Land: 35.3 sq mi (91.3 km^{2})
  - Water: 0.69 sq mi (1.8 km^{2}) 1.92%
- Elevation: 886 ft (270 m)

Population (2020)
  - Total: 1,662
  - Density: 47/sq mi (18.2/km^{2})
- Time zone: UTC-5 (Eastern)
  - Summer (DST): UTC-4 (Eastern)
- ZIP code: 03221
- Area code: 603
- FIPS code: 33-06980
- GNIS feature ID: 873549
- Website: bradfordnh.gov

Bradford is a town in Merrimack County, New Hampshire, United States. The population was 1,662 at the 2020 census. The main village of the town, where 372 people resided at the 2020 census, is defined as the Bradford census-designated place (CDP), and is located in the northeast part of the town, west of the junction of New Hampshire routes 103 and 114. The town also includes the village of Bradford Center.

== History ==
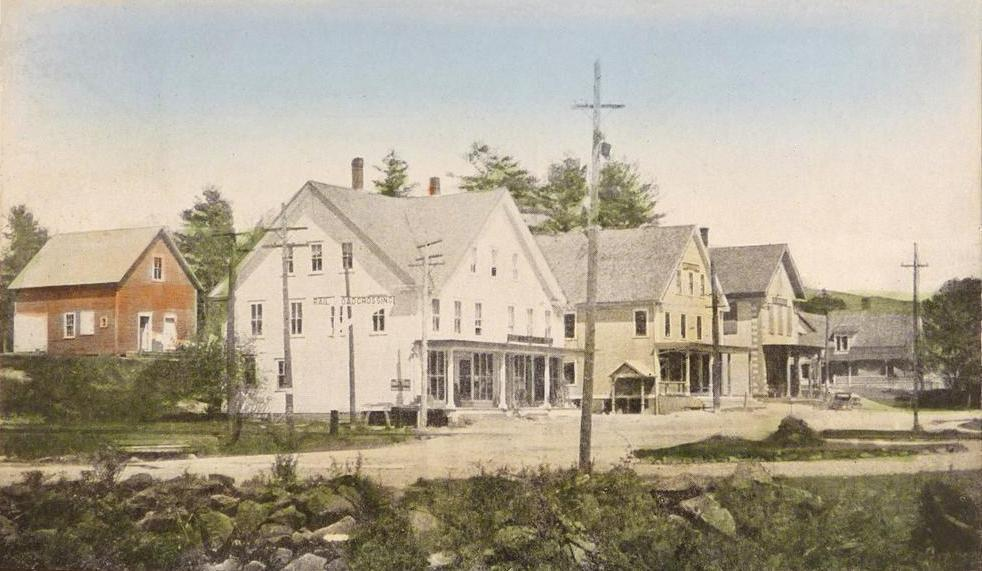
Depot Square in 1913

Granted by Governor Benning Wentworth in 1765 to John Pierce and George Jaffrey of Portsmouth, it was settled in 1771 by Deacon William Presbury and family. Three years later other settlers arrived, several of them from Bradford, Massachusetts, after which the town was named "New Bradford". Later, it was called "Bradfordton", but upon incorporation by the General Court on September 27, 1787, it was officially named Bradford.

Parts of the town are hilly, but the largest portion is in a valley with varied soil. Streams provided water power for watermills. By 1859, when Bradford's population reached 1,341, industries included one woolen mill, one sash, blind and door factory, one wheelwright shop, two sawmills, one gristmill, one tannery, and one clothing mill. In 1850, the Concord & Claremont Railroad opened from Concord to Bradford, which would remain its terminus until the line was extended to Claremont in 1871–1872.

== Geography ==
According to the United States Census Bureau, the town has a total area of 35.9 square miles (93.1 km^{2}), of which 35.3 square miles (91.3 km^{2}) are land and 0.69 square miles (1.8 km^{2}) are water, comprising 1.92% of the town. The village of Bradford is located near the northern border of the town, at the intersection of routes 103 and 114, just north of the Warner River and adjacent to the outlet of Todd Lake. The largest water body in the town is Lake Massasecum, near the town's eastern border. The Warner River and its tributaries drain the northern and central parts of town, while the southern part is drained by tributaries of the Contoocook River. Bradford lies fully within the Merrimack River watershed.

The highest point in Bradford is an unnamed 2,096-foot (639 m) summit overlooking Ayers Pond on the town's western border. Knights Hill (1,910 ft or 580 m) and Rowes Hill (1,950 ft or 590 m) constitute a large, hilly mass occupying the southern portion of town.

== Demographics ==
Historical population
Census	Pop.	Note	%±
1790	217		—
1800	740		241.0%
1810	1,034		39.7%
1820	1,318		27.5%
1830	1,285		−2.5%
1840	1,331		3.6%
1850	1,341		0.8%
1860	1,180		−12.0%
1870	1,081		−8.4%
1880	950		−12.1%
1890	810		−14.7%
1900	805		−0.6%
1910	695		−13.7%
1920	580		−16.5%
1930	587		1.2%
1940	661		12.6%
1950	606		−8.3%
1960	508		−16.2%
1970	679		33.7%
1980	1,115		64.2%
1990	1,405		26.0%
2000	1,454		3.5%
2010	1,650		13.5%
2020	1,662		0.7%
U.S. Decennial Census

As of the census of 2010, there were 1,650 people, 667 households, and 471 families residing in the town. There were 917 housing units, of which 250, or 27.3%, were vacant. 203 of the vacant units were for seasonal or recreational uses. The racial makeup of the town was 97.5% white, 0.1% African American, 0.4% Native American, 0.2% Asian, 0.1% Native Hawaiian or Pacific Islander, 0.2% some other race, and 1.6% from two or more races. 1.3% of the population were Hispanic or Latino of any race.

Of the 667 households, 29.1% had children under the age of 18 living with them, 57.7% were headed by married couples living together, 7.8% had a female householder with no husband present, and 29.4% were non-families. 21.1% of all households were made up of individuals, and 7.1% were someone living alone who was 65 years of age or older. The average household size was 2.47, and the average family size was 2.86.

In the town, 20.7% of the population were under the age of 18, 6.3% were from 18 to 24, 20.9% from 25 to 44, 38.9% from 45 to 64, and 13.2% were 65 years of age or older. The median age was 46.3 years. For every 100 females, there were 100.7 males. For every 100 females age 18 and over, there were 100.6 males.

For the period 2011–2015, the estimated median annual income for a household was $59,783, and the median income for a family was $68,750. Male full-time workers had a median income of $55,119 versus $40,000 for females. The per capita income for the town was $28,152. 7.1% of the population and 4.8% of families were below the poverty line. 7.8% of the population under the age of 18 and 8.5% of those 65 or older were living in poverty.

== Sites of interest ==
- Bement Covered Bridge, built 1854
- Bradford Bog
- Bradford Center Meetinghouse
- Bradford Pines State Forest
- Bradford Town Hall
- Lake Massasecum
- Lake Todd
- Warner River
- West Branch Warner River

== Notable people ==
- Odds Bodkin (born 1953), storyteller, musician
- John Q. A. Brackett (1842–1918), 36th governor of Massachusetts
- Will Cressy (1863-1930), performer, writer
- John Milton Hawks (1826–1910), abolitionist, physician
- Thorkild Jacobsen (1904–1993), Danish-American historian
- Ghislaine Maxwell (born 1961), convicted sex offender
- Mason Tappan (1817–1886), United States congressman, New Hampshire Attorney General
- Bainbridge Wadleigh (1831–1891), United States senator

== Gallery ==
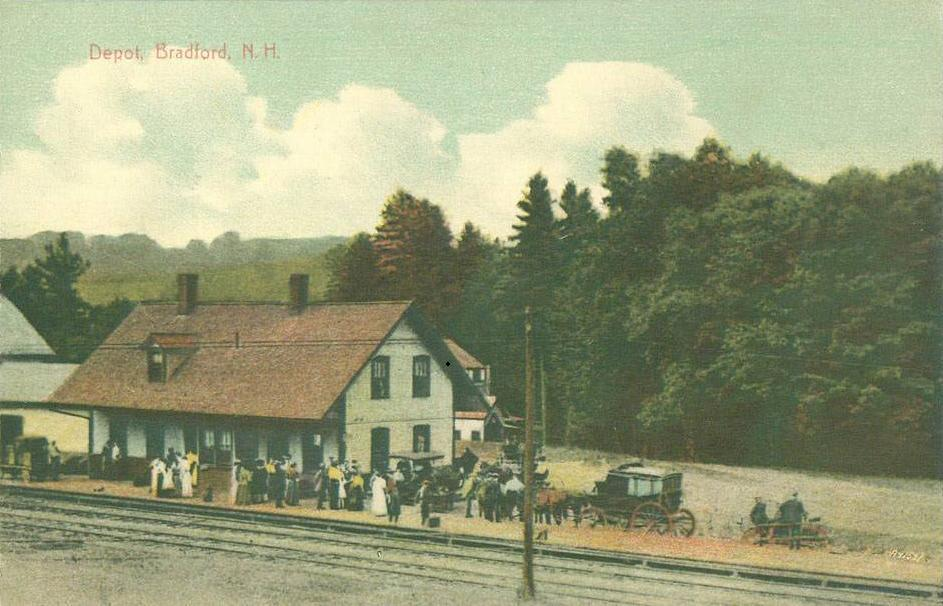
Concord & Claremont Railroad depot in 1906

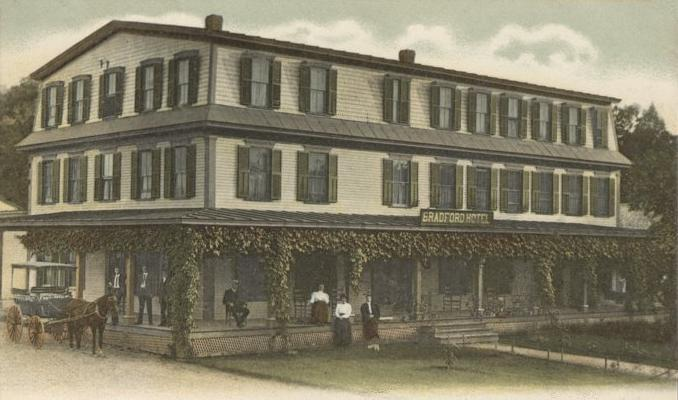
The Bradford Hotel in 1906

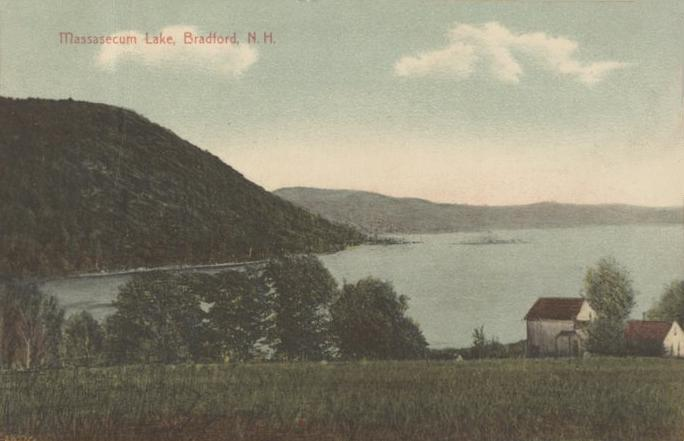
Lake Massasecum in 1909
