= Warner, New Hampshire =

Town in New Hampshire, United States

- Town
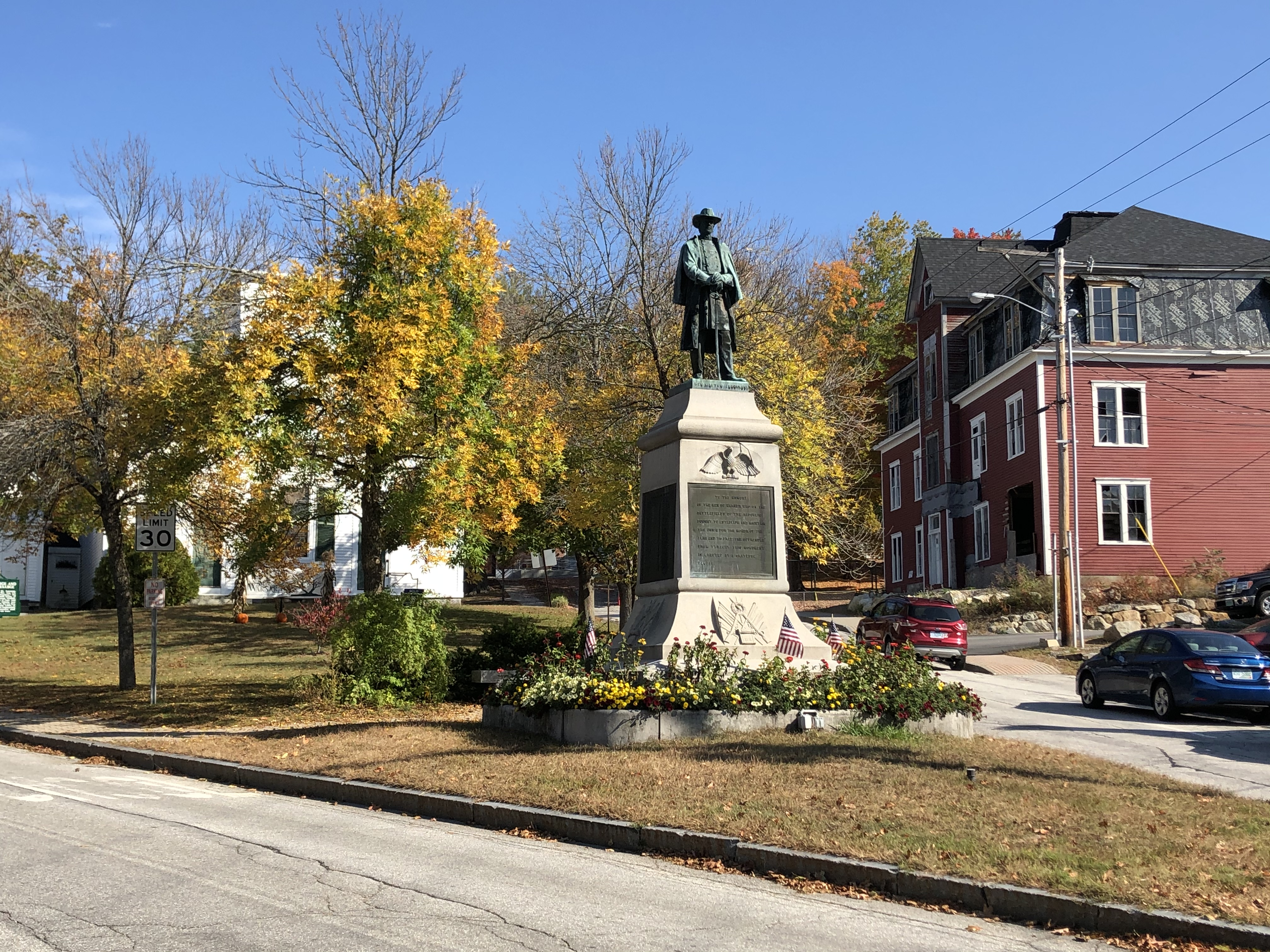
- Statue of Walter Harriman in the town center

- Seal

- Location in Merrimack County and the state of New Hampshire.
- Coordinates: 43°16′36″N 71°49′40″W
- Country: United States
- State: New Hampshire
- County: Merrimack
- Incorporated: 1774
- Villages: Warner; Davisville; Lower Village; Melvin Mills; Waterloo

Area
  - Total: 55.48 sq mi (143.69 km^{2})
  - Land: 55.23 sq mi (143.04 km^{2})
  - Water: 0.25 sq mi (0.64 km^{2}) 0.45%
- Elevation: 410 ft (120 m)

Population (2020)
  - Total: 2,937
  - Density: 53/sq mi (20.5/km^{2})
- Time zone: UTC-5 (Eastern)
  - Summer (DST): UTC-4 (Eastern)
- ZIP codes: 03278 (Warner); 03221 (Bradford)
- Area code: 603
- FIPS code: 33-78580
- GNIS feature ID: 873745
- Website: warnernh.gov

Warner is a town in Merrimack County, New Hampshire, United States. The population was 2,937 at the 2020 census. The town is home to Rollins State Park and Mount Kearsarge State Forest.

The town's central village, where 453 people resided at the 2020 census, is defined as the Warner census-designated place (CDP) and is located along New Hampshire Route 103 and the Warner River. The town also includes the communities of Davisville, Lower Village, Melvin Mills, and Waterloo.

== History ==
The town was granted in 1735 as "Number One" by Massachusetts Governor Jonathan Belcher to petitioners largely from Amesbury, Massachusetts. Called "New Amesbury", it was part of a line of settlements running between the Merrimack and Connecticut rivers intended to help defend Massachusetts against New France's predations. It was regranted by the Masonian Proprietors in 1749, when it was settled with four houses and a sawmill. Called "Jennesstown", it was abandoned and destroyed during the French and Indian War. The town was granted again in 1767 to Jonathan Barnard and others, who called it "Amesbury". But on September 3, 1774, it was incorporated as "Warner", named after Jonathan Warner, a leading Portsmouth citizen, namesake of the Warner House and relative of Governor John Wentworth. It was one of the last towns established under English provincial rule prior to the Revolution.

Warner developed into a prosperous farming community which produced meats, dairy goods, vegetables, hay and apples. The Warner River and its tributaries provided water power for mills, which in 1832 included twelve sawmills, six gristmills, a paper mill and two clothing factories. By 1858, there was also a cabinet manufacturer and bottle manufacturer. In 1885, industries included a bedstead factory, chain factory, woolen cloth factory, iron foundry, tannery, and glove manufacturer. On September 9, 1821, the town was hit by a tornado. It leveled houses and forests in a 16-to-18-mile (26 to 29 km) swath of destruction beginning west of Lake Sunapee, through New London and Sutton, over the southwest spur of Mount Kearsarge and ending at the Webster line. The storm killed four people in Warner, seriously injured others and destroyed considerable property.

Each October, on Columbus Day weekend, Warner hosts the annual Fall Foliage Festival, attracting thousands of people from all over New England and beyond.

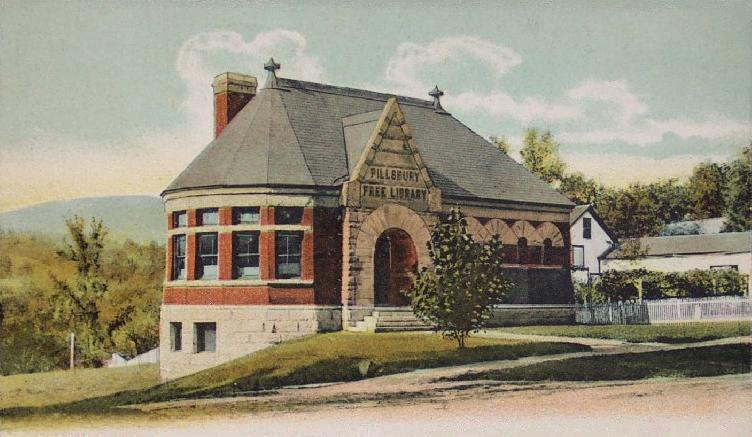
Pillsbury Free Library c. 1908

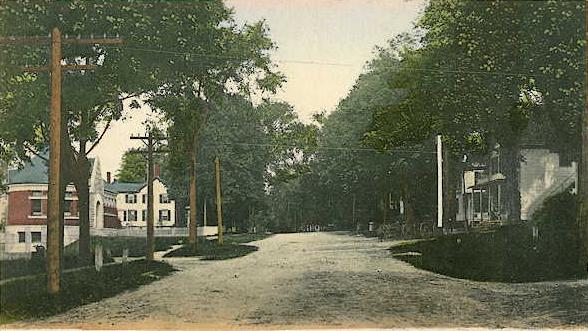
Main Street c. 1908

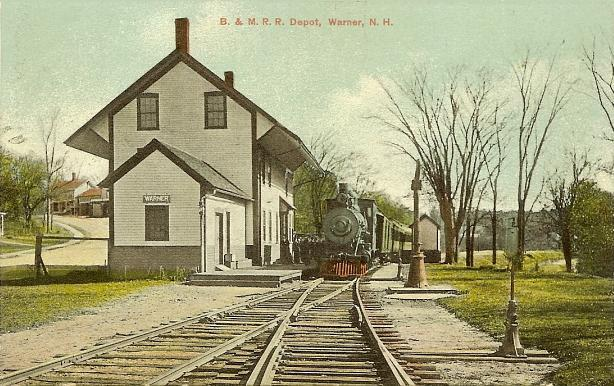
Boston & Maine Railroad depot in 1909

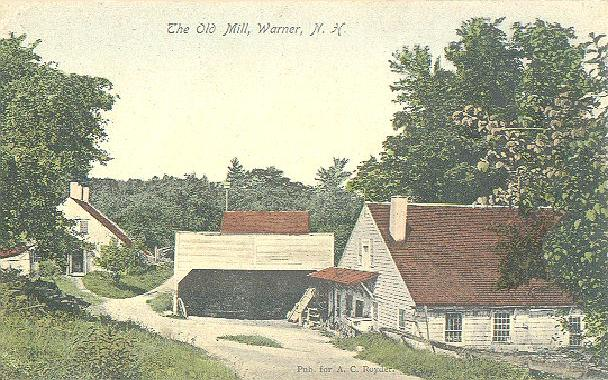
Old Mill in 1907

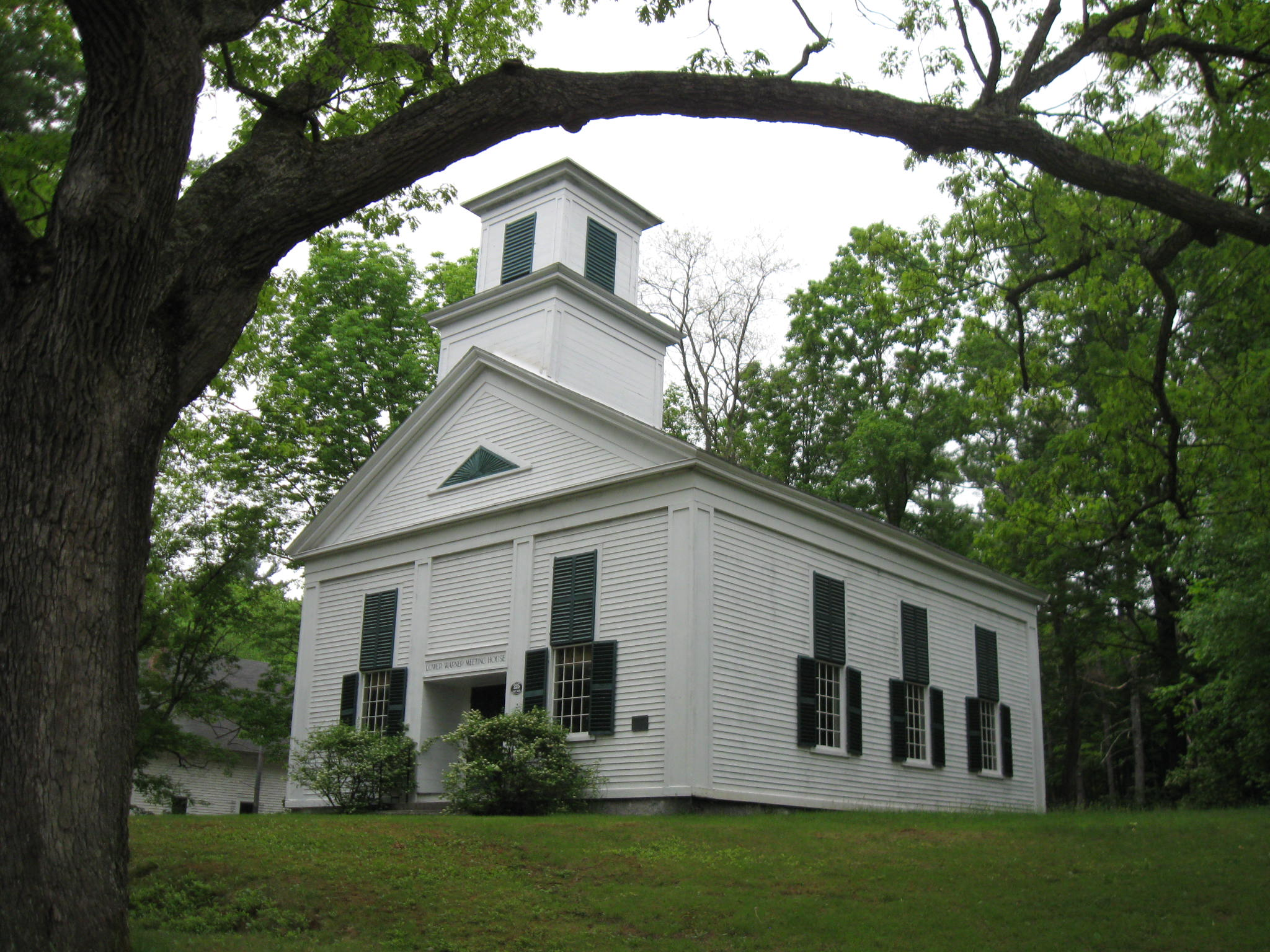
Lower Warner Meetinghouse

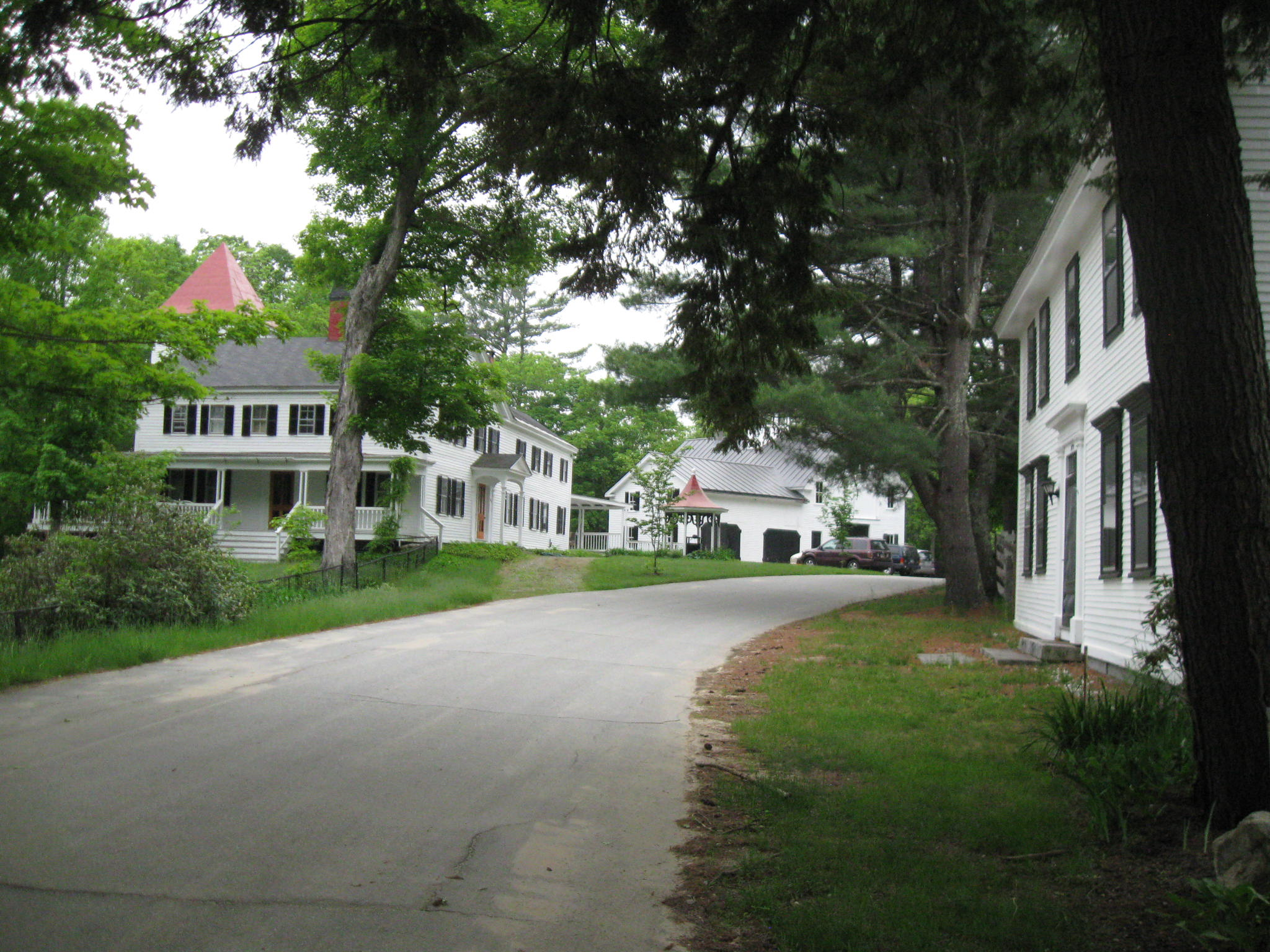
Waterloo Historic District

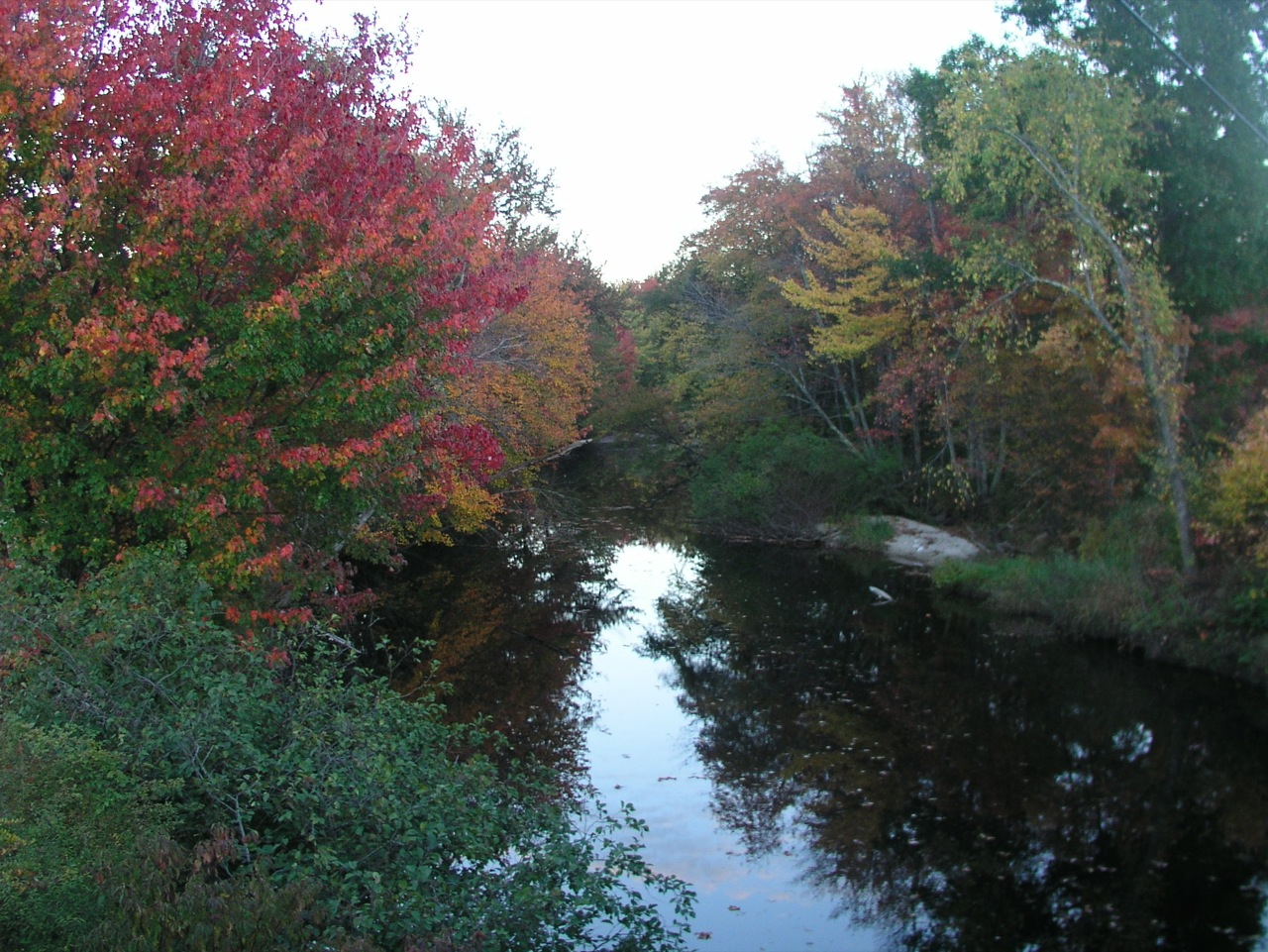
Warner River

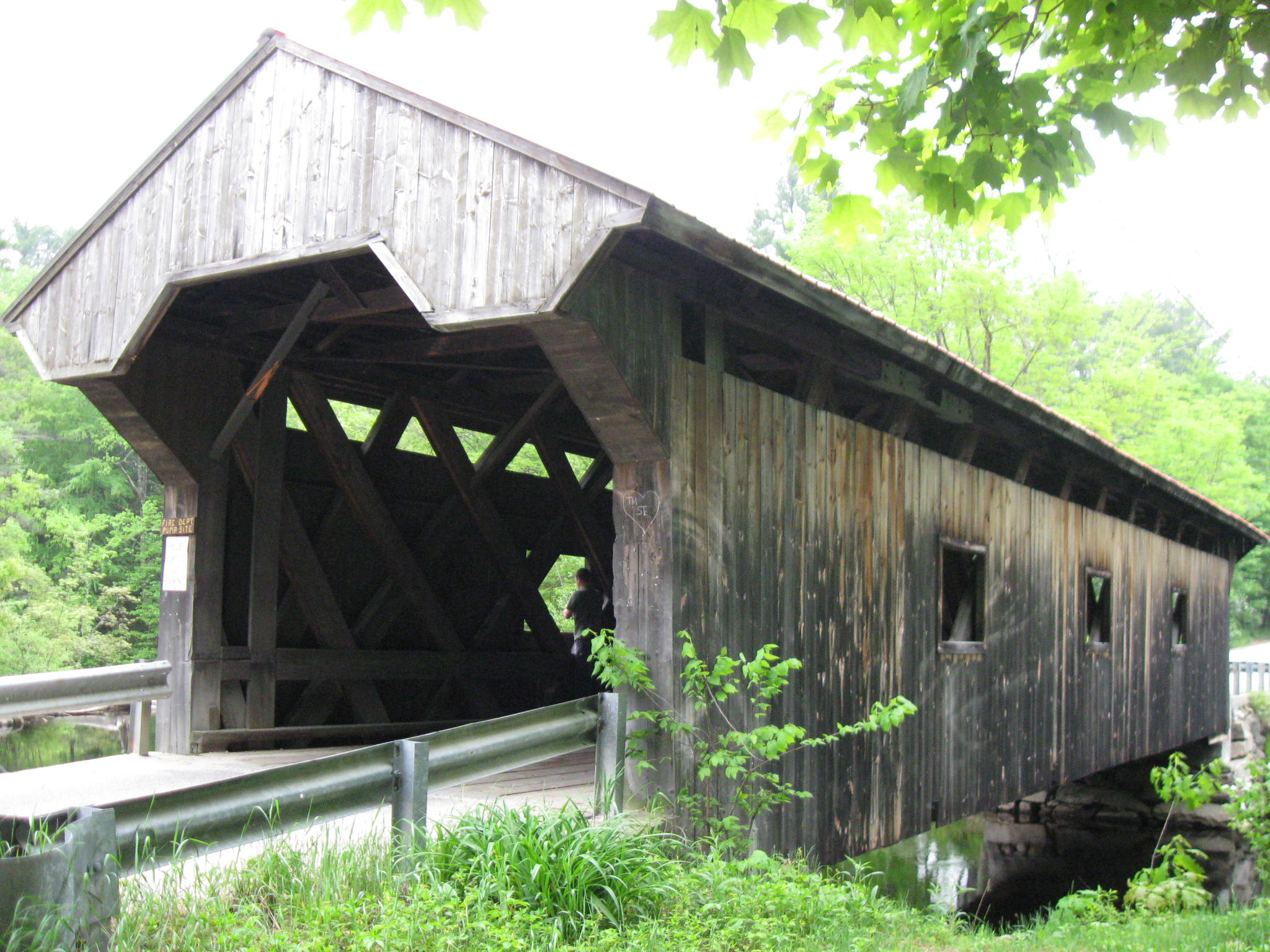
Waterloo Covered Bridge

== Geography ==
The town is in central New Hampshire, in the western part of Merrimack County. It is 19 miles (31 km) by road northwest of Concord, the state capital, and 41 miles (66 km) southeast of the Vermont border at West Lebanon.

According to the U.S. Census Bureau, the town of Warner has a total area of 55.5 square miles (143.7 km^{2}), of which 55.2 square miles (143.0 km^{2}) are land and 0.2 square miles (0.6 km^{2}) are water, comprising 0.45% of the town. The majority of Warner is drained by the Warner River, which flows past the center of town. Two covered bridges span the river: the Dalton Bridge and the Waterloo Bridge. The southwestern section of town is drained by Amey Brook and its tributary, Warner Brook, and the northernmost end of town, on the slopes of Mount Kearsarge, drains both east and west to the Blackwater River. The Warner River, Blackwater River, and Amey Brook are all tributaries of the Contoocook River, part of the Merrimack River watershed.

Mount Kearsarge, elevation 2,937 feet (895 m) above sea level, located in the extreme north of the town, is the highest point in Warner and in Merrimack County. Two state parks are located on the mountain: Rollins State Park in Warner and Winslow State Park in Wilmot. Mount Kearsarge is a popular hiking destination, due both to its bare, rocky summit, and to the fact that a paved road climbs from Rollins State Park to within a half mile of the summit. The peak is the highest point along the 75-mile (121 km) Sunapee-Ragged-Kearsarge Greenway, a hiking trail which links ten towns and encircles the Lake Sunapee region of western New Hampshire.

The town is served by Interstate 89 and New Hampshire Route 103. State routes 114 and 127 cross the extreme southwestern and southeastern corners of the town, respectively.

=== Adjacent municipalities ===
- Andover (north)
- Salisbury (northeast)
- Webster (east)
- Hopkinton (southeast)
- Henniker (south)
- Bradford (west)
- Sutton (northwest)
- Wilmot (north-northwest)

== Demographics ==
Historical population
Census	Pop.	Note	%±
1790	863		—
1800	1,569		81.8%
1810	1,838		17.1%
1820	2,246		22.2%
1830	2,222		−1.1%
1840	2,159		−2.8%
1850	2,038		−5.6%
1860	1,970		−3.3%
1870	1,667		−15.4%
1880	1,537		−7.8%
1890	1,383		−10.0%
1900	1,358		−1.8%
1910	1,226		−9.7%
1920	1,051		−14.3%
1930	1,062		1.0%
1940	1,113		4.8%
1950	1,080		−3.0%
1960	1,004		−7.0%
1970	1,441		43.5%
1980	1,963		36.2%
1990	2,250		14.6%
2000	2,760		22.7%
2010	2,833		2.6%
2020	2,937		3.7%
U.S. Decennial Census

As of the census of 2010, there were 2,833 people, 1,116 households, and 752 families residing in the town. The population density was 51.0 inhabitants per square mile (19.7/km^{2}). There were 1,228 housing units at an average density of 24.4 per square mile (8.5/km^{2}). The racial makeup of the town was 97.9% White, 0.4% African American, 0.4% Native American, 0.2% Asian, 0.3% some other race, and 0.8% from two or more races. Hispanic or Latino of any race were 1.8% of the population.

There were 1,116 households, out of which 29.0% had children under the age of 18 living with them, 56.1% were headed by married couples living together, 7.0% had a female householder with no husband present, and 32.6% were non-families. 29.0% of all households were made up of individuals, and 8.8% were someone living alone who was 65 years of age or older. The average household size was 2.44, and the average family size was 2.92.

In the town, the population was spread out, with 20.6% under the age of 18, 8.1% from 18 to 24, 22.1% from 25 to 44, 34.2% from 45 to 64, and 15.0% who were 65 years of age or older. The median age was 44.5 years. For every 100 females, there were 97.4 males. For every 100 females aged 18 and over, there were 95.3 males.

For the period 2007–2011, the estimated median annual income for a household in the town was $58,221, and the median income for a family was $65,167. Male full-time workers had a median income of $51,404 versus $34,154 for females. The per capita income for the town was $28,159. About 4.3% of the population were below the poverty line.

The Warner Area Farmers' Market, held on Saturday mornings on Main Street, serves as a community gathering place.

== Government ==
In the New Hampshire Senate, Warner is in the 15th District. On the New Hampshire Executive Council, Warner is in the 2nd District. In the United States House of Representatives, Warner is in New Hampshire's 2nd congressional district.

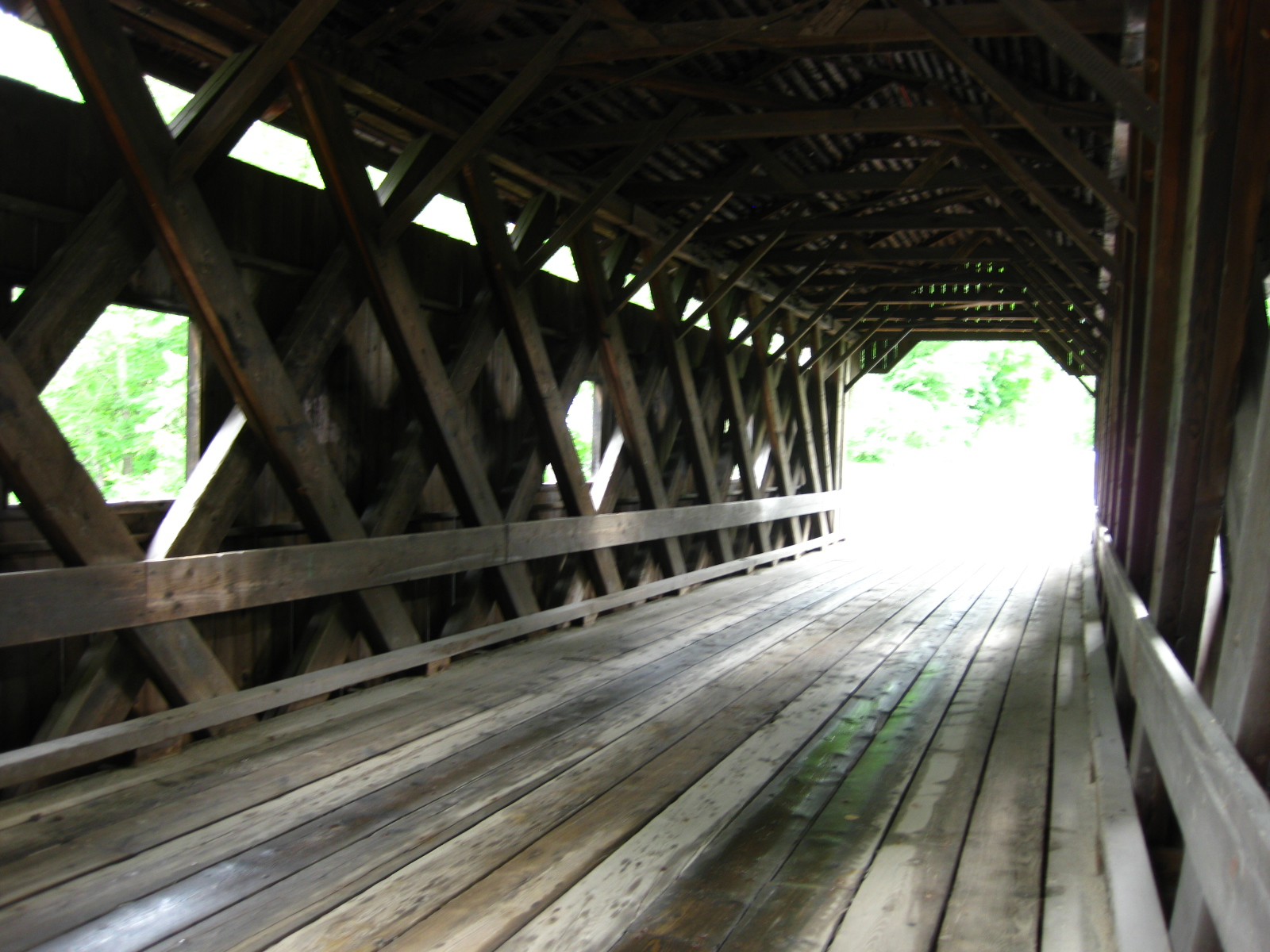
Covered bridge in Warner

== Sites of interest ==
- New Hampshire Telephone Museum
- Dalton Covered Bridge
- Mount Kearsarge Indian Museum
- The Little Nature Museum
- Rollins State Park
- Warner Historical Society & Museum
- Kearsarge Mountain Community-Supported Agriculture
- Waterloo Covered Bridge

== Notable people ==
- Caroline Gardner Bartlett (1868–1938), music educator, relief worker in World War I
- Adelaide George Bennett (1848–1911), poet, botanist
- David Carroll (born 1942), naturalist, author, MacArthur Foundation Fellow
- Rebecca Carroll (born 1969), author, editor, radio producer at WNYC Studios
- H. Maria George Colby (1844–1910), author, fashion editor
- William C. Dowling (born 1944), scholar, author, Guggenheim Fellow
- David Elliott (born 1947), children's author
- Gordon Enoch Gates (1897–1987), zoologist, Guggenheim Fellow
- Henry Gilmore (1832–1891), businessman, state senator for Massachusetts
- Walter Harriman (1817–1884), 31st governor of New Hampshire
- Amanda Bartlett Harris (1824–1917), author, literary critic
- Maxine Kumin (1925–2014), poet
- Nehemiah G. Ordway (1828–1907), seventh governor of Dakota Territory
- Jacob Osgood (1777–1844), leader of sectarian religious group
- Charles Alfred Pillsbury (1842–1899), businessman, co-founder of the Pillsbury Company
- John Sargent Pillsbury (1827–1901), businessman, eighth governor of Minnesota
- Charles Stuart Pratt (1854–1921), editor, writer
- Eliza Anna Farman Pratt (1837–1907), editor, writer
- Nellie George Stearns (1855–1936), artist, art teacher
