= Warner River =

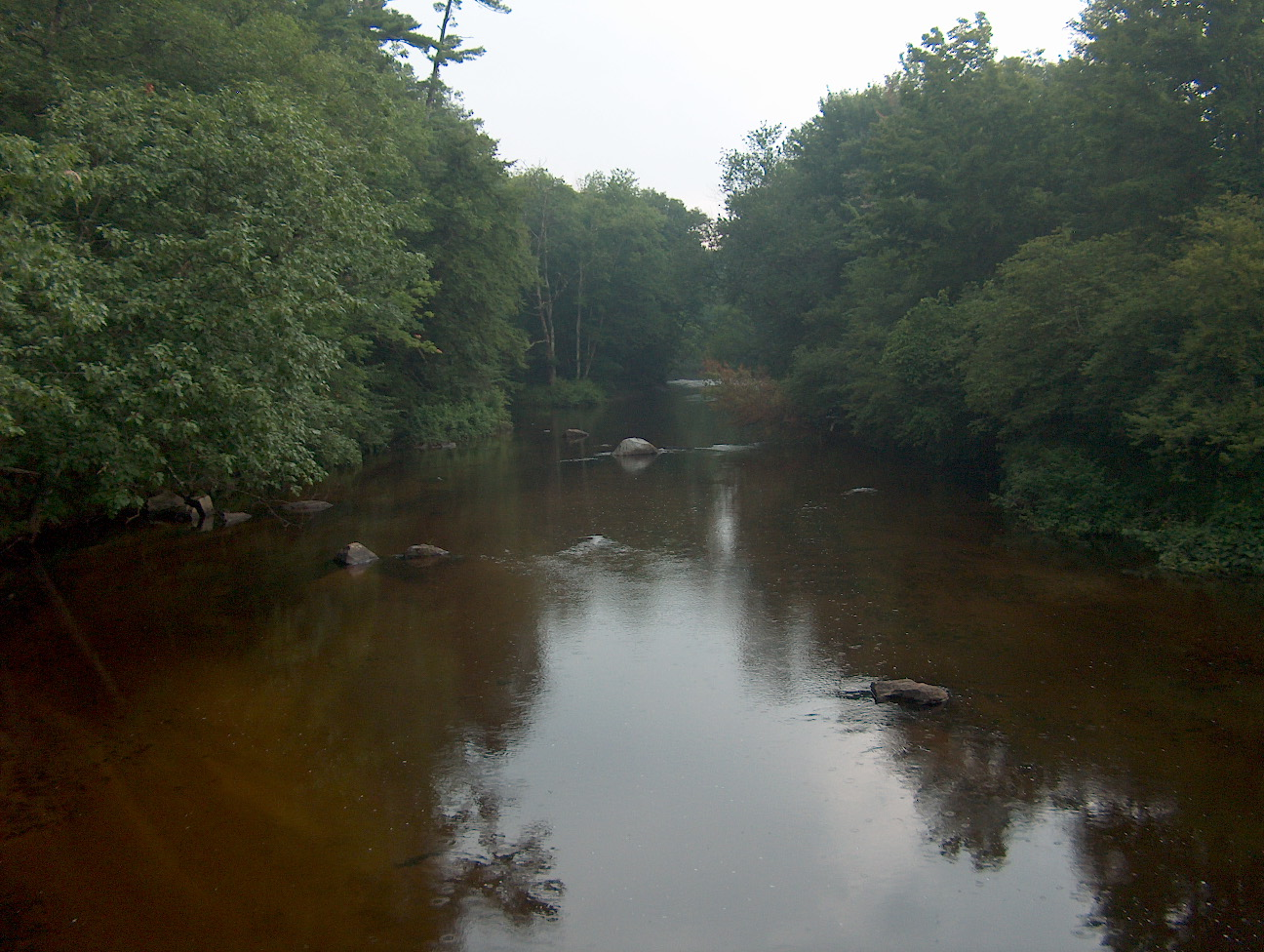
- The Warner River in Warner, New Hampshire

- Location within New Hampshire Location within the United States

Location
- Country: United States
- State: New Hampshire
- County: Merrimack
- Towns: Bradford, Sutton, Warner, Webster, Hopkinton

Physical characteristics
- Source: Todd Lake
  - location: Bradford
  - coordinates: 43°16′13″N 71°58′2″W
  - elevation: 675 ft (206 m)
- Mouth: Contoocook River
  - location: Hopkinton
  - coordinates: 43°13′58″N 71°42′41″W
  - elevation: 345 ft (105 m)
- Length: 20.3 mi (32.7 km)

Basin features
- Tributaries
  - left: Lane River, Stevens Brook, Willow Brook, Schoodac Brook
  - right: West Branch, Hoyt Brook

The Warner River is a 20.3-mile-long (32.7 km) river located in central New Hampshire in the United States. It is a tributary of the Contoocook River, part of the Merrimack River watershed.

The Warner River begins at the outlet of Todd Lake in Bradford, New Hampshire, 300 meters upstream of the confluence of the West Branch. The river flows east, receiving the outlet of Lake Massasecum, and enters the town of Warner. The small river has a long whitewater section in western Warner, passing under the Waterloo Covered Bridge next to an old railroad station, then reaches Interstate 89, after which the river flattens and meanders over gravel bars. A small waterfall at Davisville interrupts the flatwater, which resumes to the river's end, just north of the village of Contoocook, New Hampshire, in the town of Hopkinton.

New Hampshire Route 103 follows the Warner River for most of the river's length.

== See also ==
- List of rivers of New Hampshire
