= List of places in New Hampshire =

This is a list of administrative subdivisions and populated places of the lands of New Hampshire, United States.

See also US Geographic Names Information System query.

== Counties ==
Counties are administratively divided into towns, cities, and unincorporated areas.

- Category:New Hampshire counties (10 counties).

== Populated places ==
Populated places in New Hampshire generally fall into one or more of the following categories (which see):

- Category:Cities in New Hampshire (13 cities)
- Category:Towns in New Hampshire (221 towns)
- Category:Census-designated places in New Hampshire (46 places)
- Category:Unincorporated communities in New Hampshire (villages, hamlets, settlements, etc.)

== Other places ==
In New Hampshire, locations, grants, townships (which are different from towns), and purchases are unincorporated portions of a county which are not part of any town and have limited self-government (if any, as many are uninhabited).

- Category:Townships in New Hampshire (25 listed, including 9 Grants, 4 Locations and 6 Purchases)

There are also several tourism regions identified by the NH Division of Travel and Tourism:

- Dartmouth-Lake Sunapee Region (aka Upper Valley)
- Great North Woods
- Lakes Region
- Merrimack Valley Region
- Monadnock Region
- Seacoast Region
- White Mountains Region

For further information about geographic locations and features (mountains, rivers, lakes, hiking trails, etc.) in New Hampshire, please refer to Category:Geography of New Hampshire.

== A ==
- Acworth
- Albany
- Alderbrook - in Bethlehem
- Alexandria
- Allens Mills - in Gilmanton
- Allenstown
- Alstead
- Alstead Center
- Alton
- Alton Bay
- Ames - in Gilford
- Amherst
- Andover
- Antrim
- Antrim Center
- Appalachia - in Randolph
- Apthorp - in Littleton
- Arlington Park - in Salem
- Ashland
- Ashuelot - in Winchester
- Atkinson
- Atkinson and Gilmanton Academy Grant
- Atkinson Depot
- Atkinson Heights
- Atlantic - in Seabrook
- Atlantic Heights - in Portsmouth*Auburn
- Austin Corners - in Kensington

== B ==
- Baglett Grove - in Hampstead
- Bagley - in Warner
- Bailey's - former railroad station and hamlet in Jefferson
- Baileys Corner - in Dunbarton
- Baker Corner - in Marlow
- Balloch - in Cornish
- Bank - in New Ipswich
- Barnstead
- Barrett - in Lisbon
- Barrington
- Bartlett
- Bath
- Bay Meetinghouse - in Sanbornton
- Bayside - in Greenland
- Bean Island - in Candia
- Bean's Grant
- Bean's Purchase
- Bear Island - island community in Meredith
- Beatties - in Stratford
- Bedford
- Beebe River - community in Campton
- Beechwood Corner - in Fitzwilliam
- Belmont
- Bennett Corners - in Tamworth
- Bennington
- Benton
- Berlin
- Berrys Corner - in Strafford
- Bersum Gardens - in Portsmouth
- Bethlehem
- Big Rock Corner - in Sandwich
- Blackwater - in Somersworth
- Blair - in Campton
- Blodgett Landing - in Newbury
- Bonds Corner - in Dublin
- Boscawen
- Boston Harbor - in Dover
- Boutin Corner - in Benton
- Bow
- Bow Bog
- Bow Center
- Bow Junction
- Bow Lake Village - in Strafford
- Bow Mills
- Bowkerville - in Fitzwilliam
- Bowman - in Randolph
- Box Corner - in Bradford
- Boyce - in Canterbury
- Bradford
- Bradford Center
- Breakfast Hill - in Greenland
- Breezy Point - in Warren
- Brentwood
- Brentwood Corners
- Bretton Woods - in Carroll
- Brick School Corner - in Kensington
- Bridgewater
- Bristol
- Broad Acres - in Nashua
- Brookfield
- Brookhurst - in Alton
- Brookline
- Browns Corner - in Goffstown
- Bucks Corner - in Dorchester
- Bungy - in Columbia
- Burkehaven - in Sunapee

== C ==
- Cable Road - in Rye
- Cambridge
- Camp Gundalow - in Greenland
- Camp Hale - in Sandwich
- Camp Hedding - in Epping
- Campton
- Campton Hollow
- Campton Lower Village
- Campton Station
- Campton Upper Village
- Canaan
- Canaan Center
- Canaan Street
- Candia
- Candia Four Corners
- Candia Station
- Canobie Lake - in Salem
- Canterbury
- Canterbury Station
- Carroll
- Cascade - on the line between Gorham and Berlin
- Cedar Waters - in Nottingham
- Cemetery Corners - in North Hampton
- Center Barnstead - in Barnstead
- Center Conway - in Conway
- Center Effingham - in Effingham
- Center Harbor
- Center Haverhill - in Haverhill
- Center Ossipee - in Ossipee
- Center Sandwich - in Sandwich
- Center Strafford - in Strafford
- Center Tuftonboro - in Tuftonboro
- Central Park - in Somersworth
- Chandlers Mills - in Newport
- Chandler's Purchase
- Charlestown
- Chase Village - in Weare
- Chases Grove - in Derry
- Chases Mill - in Effingham
- Chatham
- Cheever - in Dorchester
- Chesham - in Harrisville
- Chester
- Chesterfield
- Chichester
- Chicks Corner - in Sandwich
- Chickville - in Ossipee
- Chocorua - in Tamworth
- Christian Hollow - in Walpole
- Christian Shore - in Portsmouth
- Cilleyville - in Andover
- Claremont
- Claremont Junction
- Clark Landing - in Moultonborough
- Clarksville
- Clinton Grove - in Weare
- Clinton Village - in Antrim
- Cluffs Crossing - in Salem
- Coburn - in New Durham
- Cocheco - in Dover
- Coffins Mill - in Hampton
- Colby - in Henniker
- Cold River - in Walpole
- Colebrook
- Collettes Grove - in Derry
- Columbia
- Concord
- Concord Heights
- Cones - in Columbia
- Conleys Grove - on Derry/Atkinson town line
- Contoocook - in Hopkinton
- Converseville - in Rindge
- Conway
- Cooks Crossing - in Bartlett
- Coos Junction - in Lancaster
- Copperville - in Milan
- Cornish
- Cornish Center
- Cornish City
- Cornish Flat
- Cornish Mills
- Cowbell Corners - in Salem
- Crane Crossing - in Newton
- Crawford's Purchase
- Creek Area - in Portsmouth
- Crescent Lake - community in Acworth
- Cricket Corner - in Amherst
- Crockett Corner - in New London
- Crocketts Crossing - in Somersworth
- Croydon
- Croydon Flat
- Croydon Four Corners
- Crystal - in Stark
- Curtis Corner - in Lyndeborough
- Curtis Corner - in Winchester
- Cushman - in Dalton
- Cutt's Grant
- Cutter Hill - in Rindge

== D ==
- Dalton
- Danbury
- Danville
- Davis - in New Durham
- Davis - in New Ipswich
- Davisville - in Warner
- Davisville - in Wilton
- Deephaven - in Holderness
- Deerfield
- Deerfield - in Bethlehem
- Deerfield Center
- Deerfield Parade
- Deering
- Derry
- Derry Village
- Dexter Corner - in New Durham
- Dimond - in Warner
- Dingit Corner - in Webster
- Dix's Grant
- Dixville
- Dixville Notch
- Dockham Shore - in Gilford
- Dodge Hollow - in Lempster
- Dodge Tavern - in Walpole
- Dole Junction - in Hinsdale
- Dorchester
- Dorrs Corner - in Ossipee
- Dover
- Dows Corner - in Exeter
- Drewsville - in Walpole
- Drury - in Peterborough
- Dublin
- Ducks Head - in Jackson
- Dummer
- Dunbarton
- Dunbarton Center
- Dundee - in Jackson
- Durham

== E ==
- East Acworth - in Acworth
- East Alstead - in Alstead
- East Alton - in Alton
- East Andover - in Andover
- East Barrington - in Barrington
- East Bear Island - in Meredith
- East Candia - in Candia
- East Concord - in Concord
- East Conway - in Conway
- East Deering - in Deering
- East Derry - in Derry
- East Freedom - in Freedom
- East Grafton - in Grafton
- East Grantham - in Grantham
- East Hampstead - in Hampstead
- East Haverhill - in Haverhill
- East Hebron - in Hebron
- East Holderness - in Holderness
- East Kingston
- East Lempster - in Lempster
- East Madison - in Madison
- East Merrimack - in Merrimack
- East Milford - in Milford
- East Plainfield - in Plainfield
- East Rindge - in Rindge
- East Rochester - in Rochester
- East Sandwich - in Sandwich
- East Springfield - in Springfield
- East Sullivan - in Sullivan
- East Sutton - in Sutton
- East Swanzey - in Swanzey
- East Tilton - in Tilton
- East Unity - in Unity
- East Wakefield - in Wakefield
- East Washington - in Washington
- East Westmoreland - in Westmoreland
- East Wilder - in Lebanon
- East Wolfeboro - in Wolfeboro
- Eastman - in Grantham
- Eastman Corners - in Kensington
- Eastman Point - in Hampton
- Easton
- Eastview - in Harrisville
- Eaton
- Eaton Center
- Edgemont - in Newbury
- Effingham
- Effingham Falls
- Elkins - in New London
- Ellisville - in Sullivan
- Ellsworth
- Elmwood - in Danbury
- Elmwood - in Hancock
- Elmwood Corners - in Hampton
- Elwyn Park - in Portsmouth
- Enfield
- Enfield Center
- Epping
- Epsom
- Errol
- Erving's Location
- Etna - in Hanover
- Exeter

== F ==
- Fabyan - in Carroll
- Fairhill Manor - in Rye
- Fairview - in Woodstock
- Farmington
- Federal Corner - in Tuftonboro
- Fernald - in Wolfeboro
- Ferncroft - in Albany
- Fernwood - in Sunapee
- Fish Market - in Enfield
- Fitzwilliam
- Fitzwilliam Depot
- Five Corners - in Bethlehem
- Five Corners - in Kensington
- Fogg Corner - in North Hampton
- Fogg Corners - in Hampton Falls
- Fords Crossing - in Danbury
- Fords Mill - in Danbury
- Forristalls Corner - in Alstead
- Foster Corners - in Salem
- Foundry - in Somersworth
- Four Corners - in Freedom
- Four Corners - in Newmarket
- Foyes Corner - in Rye
- Francestown
- Franconia
- Franklin
- Freedom
- Fremont
- Fremont Station

== G ==
- Gardners Grove - in Belmont
- Gates Corner - in Dover
- Gaza - in Sanbornton
- Gee Mill - in Marlow
- Georges - in Columbia
- Georges Mills - in Sunapee
- Gerrish - in Boscawen
- Gerrish Corner - in Webster
- Gibson Four Corners - in New Ipswich
- Gilboa - in Westmoreland
- Gilford
- Gilmans Corner - in Orford
- Gilmanton
- Gilmanton Ironworks - in Gilmanton
- Gilsum
- Glen - in Bartlett
- Glen House - in Green's Grant
- Glencliff - in Warren
- Glendale - in Gilford
- Glenmere Village - in Lee
- Goffs Falls - in Manchester
- Goffstown
- Gonic - in Rochester
- Gooch Corner - in Exeter
- Goodrich Falls - in Bartlett
- Goose Corner - in Wolfeboro
- Goose Hollow - in Thornton
- Gorham
- Goshen
- Goshen Four Corners
- Gosport - in Rye (the Isles of Shoals)
- Gossville - in Epsom
- Grafton
- Grafton Center
- Grange - in Lancaster
- Granite - in Ossipee
- Granliden - in Sunapee
- Grantham
- Grape Corner - in Effingham
- Grasmere - in Goffstown
- Great Boar's Head - in Hampton
- Great Falls - former name of Somersworth
- Green's Grant
- Greenfield
- Greenland
- Greenland Station
- Greenville
- Groton
- Groveton - in Northumberland
- Guild - in Newport

== H ==
- Hadley - in Jaffrey
- Hadley's Purchase
- Hale's Location
- Hampshire Road - in Salem
- Hampstead
- Hampton
- Hampton Beach
- Hampton Falls
- Hampton Landing
- Hancock
- Hanover
- Hanover Center
- Happy Corner - in Pittsburg
- Happy Valley - in Peterborough
- Hardscrabble - in Lyme
- Harrisville
- Hart's Location
- Hastings - in New London
- Hatfield Corner - in Hopkinton
- Haverhill
- Hayes Corner - in Milton
- Haynes Corner - in Exeter
- Hazens - in Whitefield
- Hebron
- Hell Hollow - in Plainfield
- Hemlock Center - in Charlestown
- Henniker
- Henniker Junction
- High Bridge - in New Ipswich
- Highlands - in Jefferson
- Hill
- Hill Center
- Hills Corner - in Canterbury
- Hills Corner - in Strafford
- Hillsborough
- Hillsboro Center
- Hillsboro Lower Village
- Hillsboro Upper Village
- Hinsdale
- Holderness
- Hollis
- Hollis Depot
- Holton - in Deering
- Hooks Crossing - in Auburn
- Hooksett
- Hopkinton
- Hornetown - in Farmington
- Horse Corner - in Chichester
- Howards Grove - in Derry
- Hubbard - in Derry
- Hudson
- Hudson Center

== I ==
- Idlewilde - in Pittsburg
- Interlaken Park - in Laconia
- Intervale - in Conway and Bartlett
- Ireland - in Landaff

== J ==
- Jackson
- Jackson Falls
- Jady Hill - in Exeter
- Jaffrey
- Jaffrey Center
- James City - in Deerfield
- Jefferson
- Jefferson Highland
- Jericho - in Bartlett
- Jericho - in Landaff
- Jockey Hill - in Landaff
- Johnson Corner - in Lyndeborough
- Jones Corner - in Rindge
- Jones Mills - in Gilmanton
- Joslin - in Keene

== K ==
- Kearsarge - on Conway/Bartlett town line
- Keene
- Keewayden - in Wolfeboro
- Kelleys Corner - in Gilmanton
- Kelleys Corner - in Chichester
- Kelleyville - in Newport
- Kelwyn Park - on Rollinsford/Somersworth line
- Kenison Corner - in Allenstown
- Kensington
- Keyes Hollow - in Lempster
- Kidderville - in Colebrook
- Kilkenny
- Kingston
- Klondike Corner - in New Boston

== L ==
- Laconia
- Lake Shore Park - in Gilford
- Lakeport - in Laconia
- Lakeside - in New London
- Lamprey Corners - in Kensington
- Lancaster
- Landaff
- Landaff Center
- Langdon
- Langs Corner - in Rye
- Laskey Corner - in Milton
- Lawrence Corner - in Merrimack
- Leavitt Park - in Meredith
- Leavitts Hill - in Deerfield
- Lebanon
- Lee
- Lee Five Corners
- Lees Mill - in Moultonborough
- Leighton Corners - in Ossipee
- Leighton Corners - in Strafford
- Lempster
- Lincoln
- Lincoln Park - in Nashua
- Lisbon
- Litchfield
- Little Boars Head - in North Hampton
- Littlefield - in Newfields
- Littleton
- Livermore
- Lochmere - in Tilton
- Lockehaven - in Enfield
- Lockes Corner - in Barnstead
- Londonderry
- Long Sands - in Ossipee
- Loon Cove - in Alton
- Lost Nation - in Northumberland, on Lancaster town line
- Loudon
- Loudon Center
- Lovejoy Sands - in Meredith
- Loverens Mill - in Antrim
- Low and Burbank's Grant
- Lower Bartlett - in Bartlett
- Lower Gilmanton - in Gilmanton
- Lower Shaker Village - in Enfield
- Lower Village - in Gilsum
- Lower Village - in Sunapee
- Lower Village - in Warner
- Lyford Crossing - in Fremont
- Lyman
- Lyme
- Lyme Center
- Lyndeborough
- Lynn - in Acworth

== M ==
- Madbury
- Madison
- Mallard Cove - in Laconia
- Manchester
- Maplehaven - in Portsmouth
- Mapleton - in Stratford
- Maplewood - in Bethlehem
- Marlborough
- Marlow
- Marlow Junction
- Marshall Corner - in Brentwood
- Marshfield Station - in Thompson and Meserve's Purchase
- Martin - in Hooksett
- Martin Crossing - on Epping/Fremont town line
- Martin's Location
- Martins Corner - in Hooksett
- Mascoma - in Lebanon
- Mason
- Masons - in Stratford
- Massabesic - in Manchester
- Mast Yard - in Concord
- Meaderboro Corner - in Rochester
- Meadowbrook - in Portsmouth
- Meadows - in Jefferson
- Melrose Beach - in Northwood
- Melrose Corner - in Rochester
- Melvin Mills - in Warner
- Melvin Village - in Tuftonboro
- Meredith
- Meredith Center
- Meredith Hill
- Meriden - in Plainfield
- Meriden Hill - in Columbia
- Merrill Corners - in Farmington
- Merrimack
- Middleton
- Middleton Corners
- Milan
- Milford
- Mill Hollow - in Alstead
- Mill Hollow - in Plainfield
- Mill Village - in Plainfield
- Mill Village - in Stoddard
- Millsfield
- Millville - in Salem
- Milton
- Milton Mills - in Milton
- Mirror Lake - in Tuftonboro
- Mittersill - in Franconia
- Monahan Corners - in East Kingston
- Monroe
- Mont Vernon
- Montcalm - in Enfield
- Moultonborough
- Moultonborough Falls
- Moultonville - in Ossipee
- Mount Major - in Alton
- Mount Sunapee - in Newbury
- Mountain Base - in Goffstown
- Mountain Lakes - in Haverhill and Bath
- Munsonville - in Nelson
- Murray Hill - in Hill

== N ==
- Nashua
- Nason Corners - in Hampton Falls
- Nelson
- New Boston
- New Castle
- New Durham
- New Durham Corner
- New Hampton
- New Ipswich
- New Ipswich Center
- New London
- New Portsmouth - in Middleton
- New Rye - in Epsom
- Newbury
- Newfields
- Newington
- Newington Station
- Newmarket
- Newmarket - in Warner
- Newport
- Newton
- Newton Junction - in Newton
- Noone - in Peterborough
- North Barnstead - in Barnstead
- North Beach - in Hampton
- North Branch - in Antrim
- North Brookline - in Brookline
- North Canaan - in Canaan
- North Charlestown - in Charlestown
- North Chatham - in Chatham
- North Chester - in Chester
- North Chichester - in Chichester
- North Conway - in Conway
- North Danville - in Danville
- North Dorchester - in Dorchester
- North Epping - in Epping
- North Grantham - in Grantham
- North Groton - in Groton
- North Hampton
- North Hampton Center
- North Haverhill - in Haverhill
- North Hinsdale - in Hinsdale
- North Littleton - in Littleton
- North Londonderry - in Londonderry
- North Newport - in Newport
- North Nottingham - in Nottingham
- North Pelham - in Pelham
- North Pembroke - in Pembroke
- North Richmond - in Richmond
- North Rochester - in Rochester
- North Salem - in Salem
- North Sanbornton - in Sanbornton
- North Sandwich - in Sandwich
- North Stratford - in Stratford
- North Sutton - in Sutton
- North Swanzey - in Swanzey
- North Village - in Peterborough
- North Wakefield - in Wakefield
- North Walpole - in Walpole
- North Weare - in Weare
- North Wilmot - in Wilmot
- North Wolfeboro - in Wolfeboro
- North Woodstock - in Woodstock
- Northfield
- Northfield Station
- Northumberland
- Northwood
- Northwood Center
- Northwood Narrows
- Northwood Ridge
- Notchland - in Hart's Location
- Nottingham
- Nottingham Square
- Nutter - in Bath
- Nuttings Beach - in Hebron

== O ==
- Odell
- Onway Lake - community in Raymond
- Orange
- Orford
- Orfordville - in Orford
- Ossipee
- Ossipee Lake Shores - in Ossipee
- Ossipee Valley
- Otterville - in New London

== P ==
- Pages Corner - in Dunbarton
- Pages Corner - in Fremont
- Pages Corner - in New London
- Pannaway Manor - in Portsmouth
- Paris - in Dummer
- Park Hill - in Westmoreland
- Parker - in Goffstown
- Parker Hill - in Lyman
- Parkman Corner - in Stratham
- Passaconaway - in Albany
- Pearls Corner - in Loudon
- Pelham
- Pembroke
- Pembroke Hill
- Penacook - in Concord
- Pendleton Beach - in Laconia
- Peppermint Corner - in Derry
- Pequawket - in Tamworth
- Percy - in Stark
- Perham Corner - in Lyndeborough
- Perhams Four Corners - in Hudson
- Peterborough
- Pettyboro - in Bath
- Pickering - in Rochester
- Pierce Bridge - in Bethlehem
- Piermont
- Pike - in Haverhill
- Pinardville - in Goffstown
- Pine Cliff - in Newbury
- Pine Grove Park - in Salem
- Pine River - in Effingham
- Pinkham's Grant
- Piscataqua - in Newington
- Pittsburg
- Pittsfield
- Place - in Farmington
- Plaice Cove - in Hampton
- Plainfield
- Plaistow
- Plymouth
- Pollys Crossing - in Ossipee
- Ponemah - in Amherst
- Poocham - in Westmoreland
- Portsmouth
- Portsmouth Plains
- Potash Corner - in Hudson
- Potter Place - in Andover
- Powwow River - in East Kingston
- Pratt - in Mason
- Pratts Corners - in Plainfield
- Prescott Corner - in Kensington
- Province Lake - in Wakefield
- Puckershire - in Claremont
- Purmort - in Enfield

== Q ==
- Quaker City - in Unity
- Quebec Junction - in Carroll
- Quincy - in Rumney
- Quint - in Conway
- Quinttown - in Orford

== R ==
- Rand - in Rindge
- Randolph
- Randolph Hill
- Raymond
- Redstone - in Conway
- Reeds Ferry - in Merrimack
- Richmond
- Rindge
- Rings Corner - in Pittsfield
- Rivercrest - in Hanover
- Riverdale - in Weare
- Riverhill - in Concord
- Riverside - in Seabrook
- Riverton - in Jefferson
- Robinson Corner - in Grafton
- Roby - in Warner
- Roby Corners - in Springfield
- Rochester
- Rockingham - in Newfields
- Rockwood - in Fitzwilliam
- Rockywold - in Holderness
- Rogers Crossing - in Bartlett
- Roland Park - in Ossipee
- Rollinsford
- Rollinsford Station
- Roundys Corner - in Gilsum
- Rowes Corner - in Hooksett
- Rowes Corner - in Newton
- Roxbury
- Roxbury Center
- Rumney
- Rumney Depot
- Russell - in Greenfield
- Ryder Corner - in Croydon
- Rye
- Rye Beach
- Rye North Beach

== S ==
- Sabattus Heights - in Loudon
- Sachem Village - in Lebanon
- Salem
- Salem Depot
- Salisbury
- Salisbury Heights
- Samoset - in Gilford
- Sanborn - in Hampton Falls
- Sanborn Corners - in Hampton Falls
- Sanbornton
- Sanbornville - in Wakefield
- Sandown
- Sandwich
- Sandwich Landing
- Sargent Corners - in Newton
- Sargent's Purchase
- Savageville - in Lisbon
- Sawyers - in Dover
- Sawyers River - in Hart's Location
- Scates Corner - in Randolph
- Scotland - in Winchester
- Scott - in Dalton
- Scribners Corner - in Salisbury
- Seabrook
- Seabrook Beach - in Seabrook
- Seabrook Station - in Seabrook
- Second College Grant
- Severance - in Auburn
- Shaker Village - in Canterbury
- Sharon
- Shaws Corner - in Surry
- Shelburne
- Shingle Mill Corner - in Sutton
- Short Falls - in Epsom
- Silver Lake - in Madison
- Slab City - in Weare
- Smith Colony - in Hampton
- Smith Corner - in South Hampton
- Smiths Corner - in Salisbury
- Smithtown - in Seabrook
- Smithville - in New Ipswich
- Snowville - in Eaton
- Snumshire - in Charlestown
- Snyders Hill - in Webster
- Somersworth
- South Acworth - in Acworth
- South Alexandria - in Alexandria
- South Barnstead - in Barnstead
- South Barrington - in Barrington
- South Bow - in Bow
- South Brookline - in Brookline
- South Charlestown - in Charlestown
- South Chatham - in Chatham
- South Conway - in Conway
- South Cornish - in Cornish
- South Danbury - in Danbury
- South Danville - in Danville
- South Deerfield - in Deerfield
- South Effingham - in Effingham
- South Hampton
- South Hemlock - in Charlestown
- South Hooksett - in Hooksett
- South Keene - in Keene
- South Kingston - in Kingston
- South Lancaster - in Lancaster
- South Lee - in Lee
- South Lyndeborough - in Lyndeborough
- South Merrimack - in Merrimack
- South Milford - in Milford
- South Newbury - in Newbury
- South Newington - in Newington
- South Seabrook - in Seabrook
- South Stoddard - in Stoddard
- South Sutton - in Sutton
- South Tamworth - in Tamworth
- South Weare - in Weare
- South Wolfeboro - in Wolfeboro
- Spofford - in Chesterfield
- Spragueville - in Swanzey
- Spring Haven - in Alton
- Springfield
- Springfield Junction - in Charlestown
- Squag City - in Cornish
- Squantum - in Jaffrey
- Stark
- Starr King - in Jefferson
- State Landing - in Moultonborough
- State Line - in Fitzwilliam
- Stewartstown
- Stewartstown Hollow
- Stinson Lake - in Rumney
- Stockbridge Corner - in Wolfeboro
- Stockbridge Corners - in Alton
- Stoddard
- Stoneham Corners - in Brookfield
- Strafford
- Strafford Corner
- Stratford
- Stratham
- Stratham Station - on Stratham/Greenland town line
- Success
- Sugar Hill
- Suissevale - in Moultonborough
- Sullivan
- Sunapee
- Sunapee Station
- Suncook - on Pembroke/Allenstown town line
- Surry
- Sutton
- Swanzey
- Swanzey Station
- Swetts Mills - in Webster
- Swiftwater - in Bath

== T ==
- Tamworth
- Tappan Corners - in East Kingston
- Tavern Village - in Weare
- Temple
- The Five Corners - in Hampton
- The Glen - in Pittsburg
- The Plains - in Tilton
- The Plantation - in Hampton
- The Willows - in Hampton
- Thomas - in Rindge
- Thompson and Meserve's Purchase
- Thompson Corner - in Salisbury
- Thornton
- Thorntons Ferry - in Merrimack
- Tilton
- Tinkerville - in Columbia
- Tinkerville - in Lyman
- Towles Corner - in South Hampton
- Town Hall Corner - in Hampton Falls
- Town House - in Milton
- Trapshire - in Charlestown
- Troy
- Tuftonboro
- Twin Lake Village - on New London/Springfield town line
- Twin Mountain - in Carroll
- Tyler - in Hopkinton (Tyler is also a fictional town in several novels by Brendan DuBois)

== U ==
- Union - in Wakefield
- Union Wharf - in Tuftonboro
- Unity
- Upper Kidderville - in Colebrook
- Upper Shaker Village - in Enfield
- Upper Village - in Bath
- Upper Village - in Gorham

== W ==
- Wadley Falls - in Lee
- Wakefield
- Wallis Sands - in Rye
- Walpole
- Warner
- Warren
- Washburn Corner - in Springfield
- Washington
- Water Village - in Ossipee
- Waterloo - in Warner
- Waterville Valley
- Waumbek Junction - in Jefferson
- Wawbeek - in Tuftonboro
- Weare
- Weare Corner - in Seabrook
- Weares Mill - on Seabrook/Hampton Falls town line
- Webb - in Marlborough
- Webster
- Webster Lake - in Franklin
- Webster Place - in Franklin
- Websters Mill - in Chichester
- Weirs Beach - in Laconia
- Welsh's Corner - in Strafford
- Wendell - in Sunapee
- Wentworth
- Wentworth Acres - in Portsmouth
- Wentworth Terrace - in Dover
- Wentworth Location
- West Alton - in Alton
- West Andover - in Andover
- West Barrington - in Barrington
- West Bath - in Bath
- West Brookline - in Brookline
- West Campton - in Campton
- West Canaan - in Canaan
- West Center Harbor - in Center Harbor
- West Chesterfield - in Chesterfield
- West Claremont - in Claremont
- West Concord - in Concord
- West Deering - in Deering
- West Derry - in Derry
- West Epping - in Epping
- West Franklin - in Franklin
- West Gonic - in Rochester
- West Hampstead - in Hampstead
- West Henniker - in Henniker
- West Hollis - in Hollis
- West Hopkinton - in Hopkinton
- West Kingston - in Kingston
- West Lebanon - in Lebanon
- West Milan - in Milan
- West Nottingham - in Nottingham
- West Ossipee - in Ossipee
- West Peterborough - in Peterborough
- West Plymouth - in Plymouth
- West Rindge - in Rindge
- West Rumney - in Rumney
- West Rye - in Rye
- West Salisbury - in Salisbury
- West Springfield - in Springfield
- West Stewartstown - in Stewartstown
- West Swanzey - in Swanzey
- West Thornton - in Thornton
- West Unity - in Unity
- West Wilton - in Wilton
- West Windham - in Windham
- Westmoreland
- Westmoreland Depot
- Westport - in Swanzey
- Westville - in Plaistow
- Whiteface - in Sandwich
- Whitefield
- Whittier - in Tamworth
- Wilder - in New Ipswich
- Wildwood - in Easton
- Wilmot
- Wilmot Flat
- Wilson - in Londonderry
- Wilson Corners - in Salem
- Wilton
- Wilton Center
- Winchester
- Windham
- Windham Depot
- Windsor
- Winniconic - in Stratham
- Winnicut Mills - in Stratham
- Winnipesaukee - in Moultonborough
- Winnisquam - at Sanbornton/Tilton/Belmont junction
- Winona - in New Hampton
- Wolfeboro
- Wolfeboro Center
- Wolfeboro Falls
- Wonalancet - in Tamworth
- Woodland Park - in Merrimack
- Woodlands - in Alton
- Woodman - in Wakefield
- Woodmere - in Rindge
- Woods Mill - in Stoddard
- Woodstock
- Woodsville - in Haverhill

== See also ==
- Category:Fictional populated places in New Hampshire
- Defunct placenames of New Hampshire
- List of cities and towns in New Hampshire
- List of counties in New Hampshire
- List of New Hampshire locations by per capita income
- National Register of Historic Places listings in New Hampshire
