= List of municipalities in New Hampshire =

Municipalities of New Hampshire
- Category: Municipality
- Location: State of New Hampshire
- Found in: County
- Created: 1623 (Dover)
- Number: 234
- Populations: 68 (Hart's Location) – 115,644 (Manchester)
- Areas: 0.8 square miles (2.1 km^{2}) (New Castle) – 281.4 square miles (729 km^{2}) (Pittsburg)
- Government: Council–manager; Town meeting; Mayor–council; Select Board
- Subdivisions: Village; Neighborhood

New Hampshire is a state located in the Northeastern United States. It is divided into 234 municipalities, including 221 towns and 13 cities. New Hampshire is organized along the New England town model, where the state is nearly completely incorporated and divided into towns and cities. For each town/city, the table lists the county to which it belongs, its date of incorporation, its population according to the 2020 census, its form of government, and its principal villages. Cities are indicated in boldface. Cities and towns are treated identically under state law.

New Hampshire also has a small number of townships, grants, gores and other unincorporated areas which are not part of any municipality. These are small and rare, with most located in Coös County, and cover a small amount of the land and population of the state.

== Municipal government ==
Historically, the distinction between towns and cities was the form of government. Towns are led by a board of selectmen, who enforce municipal ordinances enacted during town meetings. Cities are led by a mayor, who enforces ordinances passed by a city council or a board of aldermen. City charters are granted by special act of the New Hampshire General Court. The most recent town to be granted city status was Lebanon, in 1957. In 1979, the General Court established new processes for towns to change the form of government, and such changes no longer confer city status. Towns may adopt a new charter for a representative government, such as a council-manager form, and retain their status as a town with a more limited form of town meeting.

Generally, government forms come in several varieties:

- The standard form has a board of selectmen acting as the town executive, while the entire voting population of the town acts as the town legislature in a form known as a town meeting.
- Some towns have adopted a town manager to act as the town executive. In those cases the board of selectmen acts as the town legislature, while town meetings are advisory in nature. This form functions as the council-manager municipal form.
- Other towns have abolished their boards of selectmen and replaced it with a town council, to form a council-manager system.
- Prior to 1979, to abolish the board of selectmen and open town meeting required the town to be rechartered by the state legislature as a city, whereby the city charter would establish a representative government for the town, usually a board of aldermen or city council and led by a mayor and/or city manager.

Regardless of which form of government a municipality uses, and whether it calls itself a city or town, all cities and towns are treated identically by the state law.

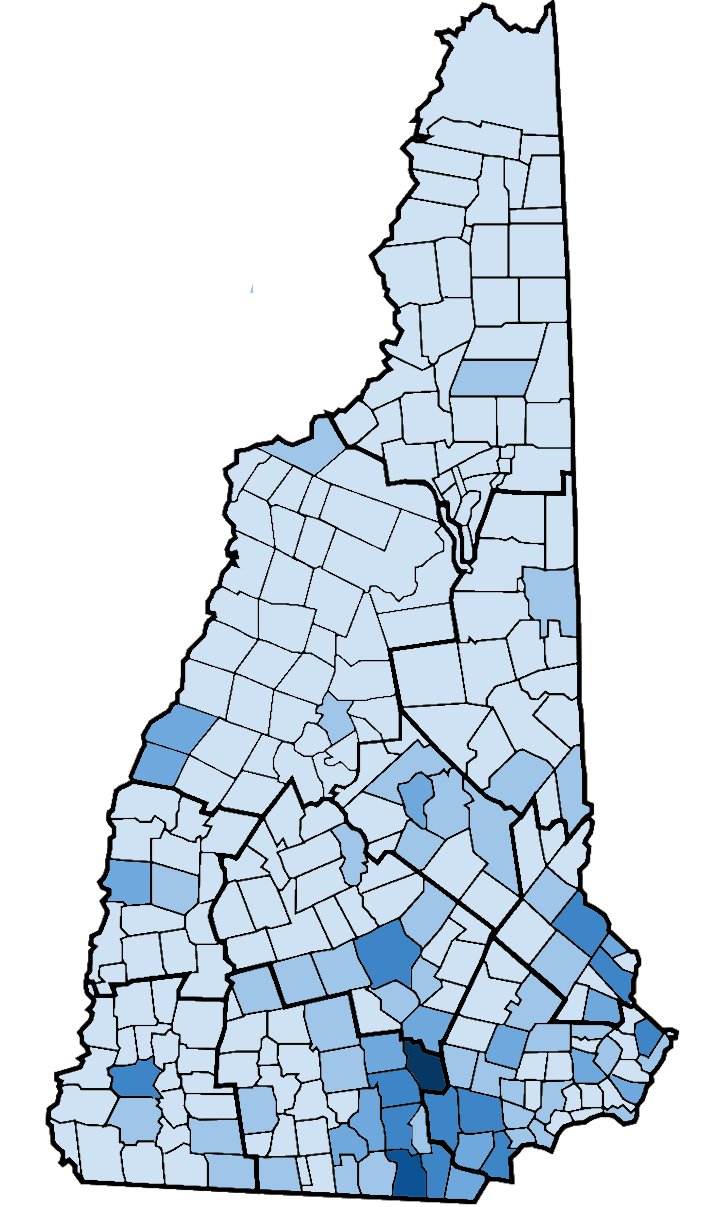
New Hampshire municipalities mapped by 2020 census population - darker places are more populous.

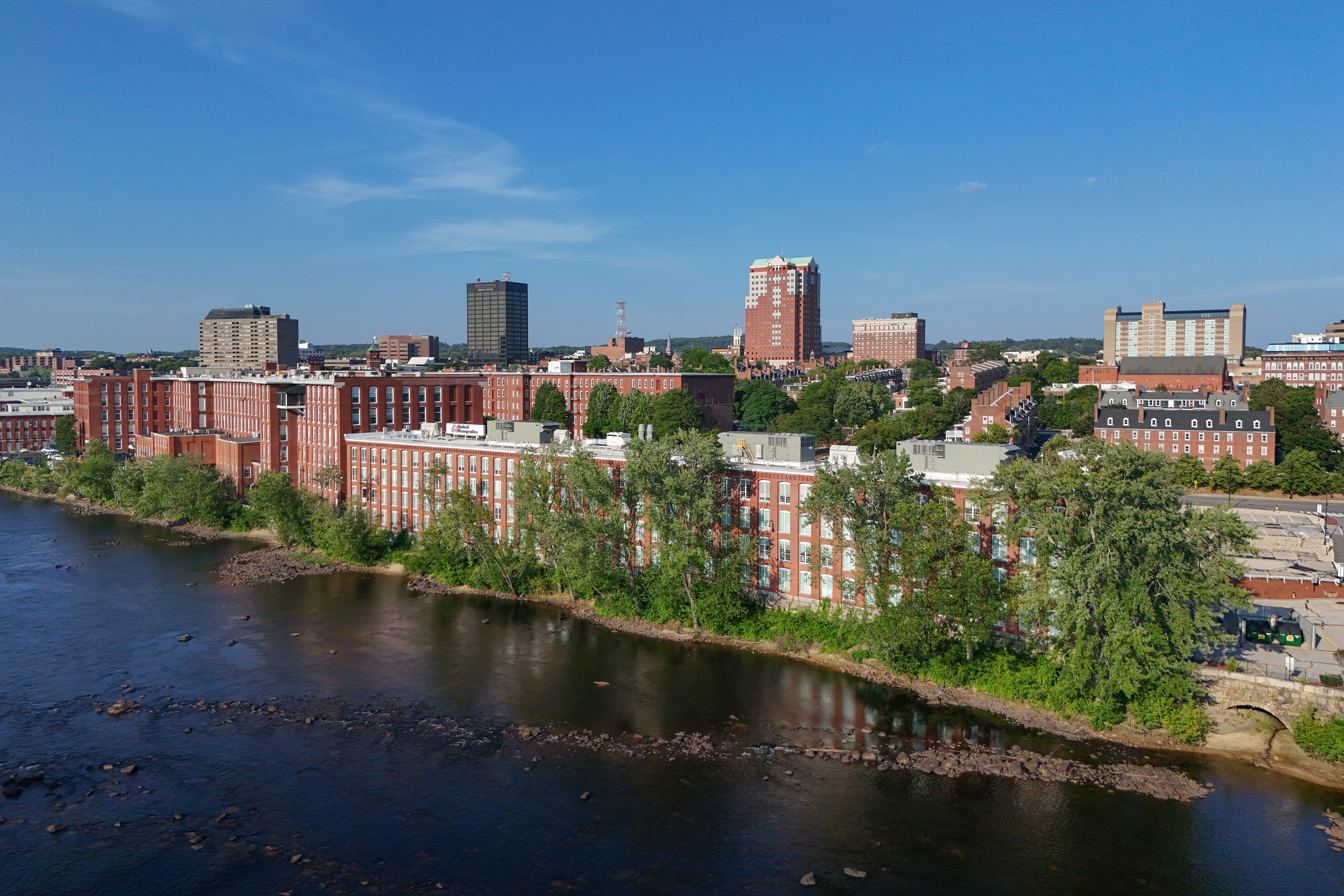
Skyline of Manchester, the state's most populous municipality

== List of municipalities ==
Cities are listed in bold. The column labeled "localities" lists the USPS postal cities, census designated places, villages and other unincorporated communities within the municipal borders.

Municipality	Type	County	Form of government	Population (2020)	Land area (sq mi)	Year incorporated	Localities
Manchester	City	Hillsborough (seat)	Mayor-council	115,644	33.1	1751	Amoskeag, Bakersville, Goffs Falls, Hallsville, Manchester, Massabesic, Rimmon Heights, Youngsville * The Manchester Department of Planning & Community Development has defined 25 neighborhoods within the city, including those listed above.
Nashua	City	Hillsborough (seat)	Mayor-council	91,322	30.8	1746	Broad Acres, Crown Hill, French Hill, Lincoln Park, Nashua, Nashville Historic District, North End
Concord	City (capital)	Merrimack (seat)	Council-manager	43,976	64.0	1733	Concord, Concord Heights, Concord Manor, East Concord, Mast Yard, Penacook, Riverhill, West Concord
Derry	Town	Rockingham	Council-manager	34,317	35.6	1827	Chases Grove, Collettes Grove, Conleys Grove, Derry, Derry Village, East Derry, Howards Grove, Hubbard, Peppermint Corner, West Derry
Dover	City	Strafford (seat)	Council-manager	32,741	26.7	1623	Bellamy, Boston Harbor, Cocheco, Dover, Gates Corner, Sawyers, Wentworth Terrace
Rochester	City	Strafford	Council-manager	32,492	45.0	1722	East Rochester, Gonic, Meaderboro Corner, Melrose Corner, North Rochester, Pickering, Rochester, West Gonic
Salem	Town	Rockingham	Council-manager	30,089	24.7	1750	Arlington Park, Canobie Lake, Cluffs Crossing, Cowbell Corners, Foster Corners, Hampshire Road, Millville, Mount Ararat, North Salem, Noyes Terrace, Pine Grove Park, Salem, Salem Depot, Wilson Corners
Merrimack	Town	Hillsborough	Council-manager	26,632	32.6	1746	Lawrence Corner, East Merrimack, Merrimack, Reeds Ferry, Souhegan Village, South Merrimack, Thorntons Ferry, Woodland Park
Londonderry	Town	Rockingham	Town council	25,826	42.0	1722	Londonderry, North Londonderry, West Derry, Wilson
Hudson	Town	Hillsborough	Town meeting	25,394	28.3	1746	Hudson, Hudson Center, Perhams Four Corners, Potash Corner
Bedford	Town	Hillsborough	Council-manager	23,322	32.8	1750	Bedford
Keene	City	Cheshire (seat)	Mayor-council	23,047	37.1	1753	Joslin, Keene, North Swanzey, South Keene
Portsmouth	City	Rockingham	Council-manager	21,956	15.7	1631	Atlantic Heights, Bersum Gardens, Christian Shore, Colonial Pines, Creek Area, Elwyn Park, Haymarket Square, Hillcrest Estates, Maplehaven, Meadowbrook, Pannaway Manor, Portsmouth, Portsmouth Plains, Sagamore Grove, Seacrest Village, Strawbery Banke, The Woodlands, Wentworth Acres
Goffstown	Town	Hillsborough	Town meeting	18,577	36.9	1761	Browns Corner, Goffstown, Grasmere, Mountain Base, Parker, Pinardville, Shirley Park
Laconia	City	Belknap (seat)	Council-manager	16,871	19.9	1855	Interlaken Park, Laconia, Lakeport, Mallard Cove, Pendleton Beach, Weirs Beach, Wildwood Village
Hampton	Town	Rockingham	Town meeting	16,214	12.9	1639	Coffins Mill, Dunvegan Woods, Eastman Point, Elmwood Corners, Great Boars Head, Hampton, Hampton Beach, Hampton Landing, North Beach, Plaice Cove, Smith Colony, The Five Corners, The Plantation, The Willows
Milford	Town	Hillsborough	Town meeting	16,131	25.2	1794	East Milford, Milford, South Milford, Richardson
Exeter	Town	Rockingham	Town meeting	16,049	19.6	1638	Dows Corner, Exeter, Gooch Corner, Haynes Corner, Jady Hill, Perkins Hill
Windham	Town	Rockingham	Town meeting	15,817	26.8	1742	West Windham, Windham, Windham Depot
Durham	Town	Strafford	Council-manager	15,490	22.4	1732	Durham
Hooksett	Town	Merrimack	Council-manager	14,871	36.4	1822	Hooksett, Martin, Martins Corner, Martins Ferry, Rowes Corner, South Hooksett
Lebanon	City	Grafton	Council-manager	14,282	40.3	1761	East Wilder, Lebanon, Mascoma, Sachem Village, West Lebanon
Pelham	Town	Hillsborough	Town meeting	14,222	26.4	1746	North Pelham, Pelham
Claremont	City	Sullivan	Council-manager	12,949	43.2	1764	Claremont, Claremont Junction, Puckershire, West Claremont
Hanover	Town	Grafton	Town meeting	11,870	49.0	1761	Etna, Hanover, Hanover Center, Rivercrest
Somersworth	City	Strafford	Council-manager	11,855	9.8	1754	Blackwater, Central Park, Crocketts Crossing, Foundry, Somersworth
Amherst	Town	Hillsborough	Town meeting	11,753	34.2	1760	Amherst, Baboosic Lake, Cricket Corner, Ponemah
Raymond	Town	Rockingham	Town meeting (with town manager)	10,684	28.8	1764	Onway Lake, Raymond
Conway	Town	Carroll	Town meeting	9,822	69.5	1765	Center Conway, Conway, East Conway, Intervale, Kearsarge, North Conway, Quint, Redstone, South Conway
Newmarket	Town	Rockingham	Council-manager	9,430	12.5	1727	Four Corners, Newmarket
Berlin	City	Coös	Council-manager	9,425	61.4	1829	Berlin, Berlin Mills, Cascade
Barrington	Town	Strafford	Town meeting	9,326	46.6	1722	Barrington, East Barrington, South Barrington, West Barrington
Weare	Town	Hillsborough	Town meeting	9,092	58.8	1764	Chase Village, Clinton Grove, North Weare, Riverdale, Slab City, South Weare, Tavern Village, Weare
Hampstead	Town	Rockingham	Town meeting	8,998	13.3	1749	Baglett Grove, East Hampstead, Hampstead, West Hampstead
Franklin	City	Merrimack	Council-manager	8,741	27.4	1828	Franklin, Webster Lake, Webster Place, West Franklin
Litchfield	Town	Hillsborough	Town meeting	8,478	15.1	1734	Litchfield
Seabrook	Town	Rockingham	Town meeting (with town manager)	8,401	8.9	1768	Atlantic, Fogg Corners, Riverside, Seabrook, Seabrook Beach, Seabrook Station, Smithtown, South Seabrook, Walton Landing, Weare Corner, Weares Mill
Hollis	Town	Hillsborough	Town meeting	8,342	31.8	1746	Hollis, Hollis Depot, West Hollis
Bow	Town	Merrimack	Town meeting (with town manager)	8,229	28.0	1727	Bow Bog, Bow Center, Bow Junction, Bow Mills, South Bow
Plaistow	Town	Rockingham	Town meeting (with town manager)	7,830	10.6	1749	Atkinson Depot, Plaistow, Westville
Gilford	Town	Belknap	Town meeting	7,699	38.9	1812	Ames, Belknap Point, Dockham Shore, Gilford, Glendale, Lake Shore Park, Samoset, The Ledges, Yale Estates
Stratham	Town	Rockingham	Town meeting	7,669	15.1	1716	Parkman Corner, Stratham, Winniconic, Winnicut Mills
Belmont	Town	Belknap	Town meeting	7,314	30.5	1727	Belmont, Gardners Grove, Lochmere, Winnisquam, Tioga
Swanzey	Town	Cheshire	Town meeting	7,270	45.0	1753	East Swanzey, North Swanzey, Spragueville, Swanzey, Swanzey Station, West Swanzey, Westport
Pembroke	Town	Merrimack	Town meeting	7,207	22.8	1759	North Pembroke, Pembroke, Pembroke Hill, Suncook (west part)
Epping	Town	Rockingham	Town meeting (with ballot initiative)	7,125	26.0	1741	Camp Hedding, Epping, Martin Crossing, North Epping, West Epping
Atkinson	Town	Rockingham	Town meeting	7,087	11.2	1767	Atkinson, Atkinson Heights, Conleys Grove, Westville, Atkinson Depot
Farmington	Town	Strafford	Town meeting	6,722	37.2	1798	Farmington, Hornetown, Merrill Corners, Place
Plymouth	Town	Grafton	Town meeting	6,682	28.1	1763	Plymouth, West Plymouth
Meredith	Town	Belknap	Town meeting (with town manager)	6,662	39.9	1768	Bear Island, East Bear Island, Leavitt Park, Lovejoy Sands, Meredith, Meredith Center, Meredith Hill
Sandown	Town	Rockingham	Town meeting	6,548	13.9	1756	Sandown
Rindge	Town	Cheshire	Town meeting (with town manager)	6,476	37.2	1768	Converseville, Cutter Hill, East Rindge, Jones Corner, Rand, Rindge, Thomas, West Rindge, Woodmere
Peterborough	Town	Hillsborough	Town meeting	6,418	37.7	1760	Drury, Happy Valley, MacDowell, Noone, North Village, Peterborough, West Peterborough
Wolfeboro	Town	Carroll	Town meeting (with town manager)	6,416	47.9	1770	Cotton Valley Station, East Wolfeboro, Fernald, Goose Corner, Keewayden, North Wolfeboro, South Wolfeboro, Stockbridge Corner, Wolfeboro, Wolfeboro Center, Wolfeboro Falls
Newport	Town	Sullivan (seat)	Town meeting	6,299	43.6	1761	Chandler Station, Chandlers Mills, Guild, Kelleyville, Newport, North Newport
Kingston	Town	Rockingham	Town meeting	6,202	19.7	1694	Kingston, South Kingston, West Kingston
Henniker	Town	Merrimack	Town meeting	6,185	44.1	1768	Colby, Henniker, Henniker Junction, West Henniker, Emerson Station
New Boston	Town	Hillsborough	Town meeting	6,108	42.8	1763	Klondike Corner, New Boston
Littleton	Town	Grafton	Town meeting	6,005	50.1	1784	Apthorp, Littleton, North Littleton
Auburn	Town	Rockingham	Town meeting	5,946	25.2	1845	Auburn, Hooks Crossing, Severance
Hillsborough	Town	Hillsborough	Town meeting	5,939	43.6	1772	Hillsborough, Hillsboro Center, Hillsboro Lower Village, Hillsboro Upper Village, Bridge Village
Hopkinton	Town	Merrimack	Town meeting	5,914	43.4	1765	Contoocook, Hatfield Corner, Hopkinton, Tyler, West Hopkinton
Alton	Town	Belknap	Town meeting	5,894	62.9	1796	Alton, Alton Bay, Brookhurst, East Alton, Loon Cove, Mount Major, South Alton, Spring Haven, Stockbridge Corners, West Alton, Woodlands
Brookline	Town	Hillsborough	Town meeting	5,639	19.8	1769	Brookline, North Brookline, South Brookline, West Brookline
Loudon	Town	Merrimack	Town meeting	5,576	46.8	1773	Loudon, Loudon Center, Loudon Ridge, Pearls Corner, Sabattus Heights
Rye	Town	Rockingham	Town meeting	5,543	12.6	1726	Acorn Acres, Cable Road, Fairhill Manor, Foss Beach, Foyes Corner, Gosport, Jenness Beach, Langs Corner, Odiorne Point, Rye, Rye Beach, Rye Harbor, Rye North Beach, Wallis Sands, West Rye
Jaffrey	Town	Cheshire	Town meeting (with town manager)	5,320	38.3	1773	Hadley, Jaffrey, Jaffrey Center, Squantum
Chester	Town	Rockingham	Town meeting	5,232	25.9	1722	Chester, North Chester
Nottingham	Town	Rockingham	Town meeting	5,229	46.5	1722	Cedar Waters, North Nottingham, Nottingham, Nottingham Square, West Nottingham, Pawtuckaway
New Ipswich	Town	Hillsborough	Town meeting	5,204	32.8	1762	Bank, Davis, Gibson Four Corners, High Bridge, New Ipswich, New Ipswich Center, Smithville, Wilder
Wakefield	Town	Carroll	Town meeting	5,201	39.5	1774	East Wakefield, North Wakefield, Province Lake, Sanbornville, Union, Wakefield, Woodman
Moultonborough	Town	Carroll	Town meeting	4,918	59.5	1777	Clark Landing, Lees Mill, Moultonborough, Moultonborough Falls, State Landing, Suissevale, Winnipesaukee
Barnstead	Town	Belknap	Town meeting	4,915	42.0	1727	Barnstead Parade, Center Barnstead, Lockes Corner, North Barnstead, South Barnstead
Northfield	Town	Merrimack	Town meeting	4,872	28.8	1780	Northfield, Northfield Station
Deerfield	Town	Rockingham	Town meeting	4,855	50.9	1766	Deerfield, Deerfield Center, Deerfield Parade, James City, Leavitts Hill, Mount Delight, South Deerfield
Epsom	Town	Merrimack	Town meeting	4,834	34.2	1727	Epsom, Gossville, New Rye, Short Falls
Newton	Town	Rockingham	Town meeting	4,820	9.9	1749	Crane Crossing, Newton, Newton Junction, Rowes Corner, Sargent Corners
Charlestown	Town	Sullivan	Town meeting	4,806	35.8	1753	Charlestown, Hemlock Center, North Charlestown, Snumshire, South Charlestown, South Hemlock, Springfield Junction, Trapshire
Fremont	Town	Rockingham	Town meeting	4,739	17.2	1764	Fremont, Fremont Station, Lyford Crossing, Pages Corner
Allenstown	Town	Merrimack	Town meeting	4,707	20.3	1831	Allenstown, Blodgett, Kenison Corner, Suncook (east part)
Northwood	Town	Rockingham	Town meeting	4,641	28.0	1773	Melrose Beach, Northwood, Northwood Center, Northwood Narrows, Northwood Ridge
Haverhill	Town	Grafton (seat)	Town meeting (with town manager)	4,585	51.0	1763	Center Haverhill, East Haverhill, Haverhill, Mountain Lakes(south part), North Haverhill, Pike, Woodsville
North Hampton	Town	Rockingham	Town meeting	4,538	13.9	1742	Bass Beach, Cemetery Corners, Fogg Corner, Little Boars Head, North Hampton, North Hampton Center
Lee	Town	Strafford	Town meeting	4,520	20.0	1766	Glenmere Village, Lee, Lee Five Corners, South Lee, Wadley Falls
Brentwood	Town	Rockingham (seat)	Town meeting	4,490	16.8	1742	Brentwood, Brentwood Corners, Marshall Corner
Milton	Town	Strafford	Town meeting	4,482	33.1	1802	Hayes Corner, Laskey Corner, Milton, Milton Mills, Town House
Enfield	Town	Grafton	Town meeting	4,465	40.3	1761	Enfield, Enfield Center, Fish Market, Lockehaven, Lower Shaker Village, Montcalm, Purmort, Upper Shaker Village
Danville	Town	Rockingham	Town meeting	4,408	11.7	1760	Danville, North Danville, South Danville
New London	Town	Merrimack	Town meeting	4,400	22.5	1779	Crockett Corner, Elkins, Hastings, Lakeside, New London, Otterville, Pages Corner
Ossipee	Town	Carroll (seat)	Town meeting	4,372	70.8	1785	Center Ossipee, Chickville, Dorrs Corner, Granite, Leighton Corners, Long Sands, Moultonville, Ossipee, Ossipee Lake Shores, Ossipee Valley, Pollys Crossing, Roland Park, Water Village, West Ossipee
Strafford	Town	Strafford	Town meeting	4,230	49.2	1820	Berrys Corner, Bow Lake Village, Center Strafford, Hills Corner, Leighton Corners, Strafford, Strafford Corner, Welsh's Corner
Winchester	Town	Cheshire	Town meeting	4,150	54.9	1753	Ashuelot, Camp Forest Lake, Curtis Corner, Scotland, Winchester
Pittsfield	Town	Merrimack	Town meeting	4,075	23.9	1782	Pittsfield, Rings Corner, South Pittsfield, Webster Mills
Greenland	Town	Rockingham	Town meeting	4,067	10.5	1721	Bayside, Breakfast Hill, Camp Gundalow, Greenland, Greenland Station, Stratham Station
Candia	Town	Rockingham	Town meeting	4,013	30.3	1763	Bean Island, Candia, Candia Four Corners, Candia Station, East Candia
Boscawen	Town	Merrimack	Town meeting	3,998	24.7	1760	Boscawen, Gerrish
Tilton	Town	Belknap	Town meeting	3,962	11.1	1869	Belmont Junction, East Tilton, Lochmere, The Plains, Tilton, Winnisquam
Hinsdale	Town	Cheshire	Town meeting	3,948	20.6	1753	Dole Junction, Hinsdale, North Hinsdale
Gilmanton	Town	Belknap	Town meeting	3,945	57.2	1727	Allens Mills, Gilmanton Corners, Gilmanton Ironworks, Jones Mills, Kelleys Corner, Lower Gilmanton
Wilton	Town	Hillsborough	Town meeting	3,896	25.8	1762	Davisville, West Wilton, Wilton, Wilton Center
Canaan	Town	Grafton	Town meeting	3,794	53.2	1761	Canaan, Canaan Center, Canaan Street, North Canaan, West Canaan
Walpole	Town	Cheshire	Town meeting	3,633	35.2	1752	Christian Hollow, Cold River, Dodge Tavern, Drewsville, North Walpole, Walpole
Chesterfield	Town	Cheshire	Town meeting	3,552	45.6	1752	Chesterfield, Spofford, West Chesterfield
Grantham	Town	Sullivan	Town meeting	3,404	27.2	1761	East Grantham, Eastman, Grantham, North Grantham
Campton	Town	Grafton	Town meeting	3,343	51.9	1761	Beebe River, Blair, Campton Hollow, Campton Lower Village, Campton Station, Campton Upper Village, West Campton
Sunapee	Town	Sullivan	Town meeting (with town manager)	3,342	21.1	1781	Burkehaven, Fernwood, Georges Mills, Granliden, Lower Village, Sunapee, Sunapee Station, Wendell
Bristol	Town	Grafton	Town meeting (with town manager)	3,244	17.1	1819	Bristol
Lancaster	Town	Coös (seat)	Town meeting	3,218	49.8	1763	Coos Junction, Grange, Lancaster, Lost Nation, South Lancaster
Bartlett	Town	Carroll	Town meeting	3,200	74.9	1790	Bartlett, Cooks Crossing, Glen, Goodrich Falls, Jericho, Lower Bartlett, Intervale, Kearsarge, Rogers Crossing
Sanbornton	Town	Belknap	Town meeting	3,026	47.6	1770	Bay Meetinghouse, Gaza, North Sanbornton, Sanbornton, Winnisquam
Dunbarton	Town	Merrimack	Town meeting	3,005	30.9	1765	Baileys Corner, Dunbarton Center, Pages Corner
Warner	Town	Merrimack	Town meeting	2,937	55.6	1774	Bagley, Davisville, Dimond, Lower Village, Melvin Mills, Newmarket, Roby, Warner, Waterloo
Tamworth	Town	Carroll	Town meeting	2,812	59.7	1766	Bennett Corners, Chocorua, Pequawket, South Tamworth, Tamworth, Whittier, Wonalancet
Thornton	Town	Grafton	Town meeting	2,708	50.2	1763	Goose Hollow, Thornton, West Thornton
Gorham	Town	Coös	Town meeting	2,698	31.9	1836	Cascade, Gorham, Upper Village, Lead Mines
New Durham	Town	Strafford	Town meeting	2,693	41.5	1762	Coburn, Copplecrown Village District, Davis, Dexter Corner, New Durham, New Durham Corner
Chichester	Town	Merrimack	Town meeting	2,665	21.1	1727	Chichester, Horse Corner, Kelleys Corner, North Chichester, Websters Mill
Antrim	Town	Hillsborough	Town meeting	2,651	35.7	1777	Antrim, Antrim Center, Clinton Village, Loverens Mill, North Branch
Rollinsford	Town	Strafford	Town meeting	2,597	7.3	1849	Kelwyn Park, Rollinsford, Rollinsford Station
Mont Vernon	Town	Hillsborough	Town meeting	2,584	16.6	1803	Mont Vernon
Madison	Town	Carroll	Town meeting	2,565	38.5	1852	East Madison, Eidelweiss, Madison, Silver Lake
Whitefield	Town	Coös	Town meeting	2,490	34.2	1804	Hazens, Whitefield
Bethlehem	Town	Grafton	Town meeting	2,484	90.6	1799	Alderbrook, Bethlehem, Deerfield, Five Corners, Maplewood, Pierce Bridge
Tuftonboro	Town	Carroll	Town meeting	2,467	41.0	1795	Center Tuftonboro, Federal Corner, Melvin Village, Mirror Lake, Tuftonboro Corner, Union Wharf, Wawbeek
Plainfield	Town	Sullivan	Town meeting	2,459	52.2	1761	Coryville, East Plainfield, Hell Hollow, Meriden, Mill Village, Plainfield, Pratts Corners
East Kingston	Town	Rockingham	Town meeting	2,441	10.0	1738	East Kingston, Monahan Corners, Powwow River, Tappan Corners
Andover	Town	Merrimack	Town meeting	2,406	40.5	1779	Andover, Cilleyville, East Andover, Halcyon Station, Potter Place, West Andover
Hampton Falls	Town	Rockingham	Town meeting (with ballot initiative)	2,403	12.2	1726	Brimstone Hill (The Common), Fogg Corners, Hampton Falls, Nason Corners, Sanborn, Sanborn Corners, Town Hall Corner, Weares Mill
Canterbury	Town	Merrimack	Town meeting	2,389	43.6	1741	Boyce, Canterbury, Canterbury Station, Hills Corner, Shaker Village
New Hampton	Town	Belknap	Town meeting	2,377	36.7	1777	New Hampton, Winona
Fitzwilliam	Town	Cheshire	Town meeting	2,351	34.6	1773	Beechwood Corners, Bowkerville, Fitzwilliam, Fitzwilliam Depot, Rockwood, State Line
Newbury	Town	Merrimack	Town meeting	2,172	35.8	1778	Box Corner, Blodgett Landing, Chalk Pond, Edgemont, Mount Sunapee, Newbury, Pine Cliff, South Newbury
Troy	Town	Cheshire	Town meeting	2,130	17.4	1815	Troy
Northumberland	Town	Coös	Town meeting	2,126	35.7	1779	Groveton, Northumberland
Marlborough	Town	Cheshire	Town meeting	2,096	20.4	1776	Marlborough, Webb
Kensington	Town	Rockingham	Town meeting	2,095	11.9	1737	Austin Corners, Brick School Corner, Eastman Corners, Five Corners, Kensington, Lamprey Corners, Prescott Corner
Colebrook	Town	Coös	Town meeting	2,084	40.7	1796	Colebrook, Kidderville, Upper Kidderville, Factory Village
Holderness	Town	Grafton	Town meeting	2,004	30.5	1761	Deephaven, East Holderness, Holderness, Rockywold
Sutton	Town	Merrimack	Town meeting	1,978	42.3	1784	East Sutton, North Sutton, Shingle Mill Corner, South Sutton, Sutton, Sutton Mills
Greenville	Town	Hillsborough	Town meeting	1,974	6.9	1872	Greenville
Ashland	Town	Grafton	Town meeting	1,938	11.0	1868	Ashland
Madbury	Town	Strafford	Town meeting	1,918	11.7	1755	Madbury
Webster	Town	Merrimack	Town meeting	1,913	27.9	1860	Courser Hill, Dingit Corner, Gerrish Corner, Snyders Mill, Swetts Mills, Webster
Deering	Town	Hillsborough	Town meeting	1,904	30.8	1774	Deering, East Deering, Holton, West Deering
Alstead	Town	Cheshire	Town meeting	1,864	38.8	1763	Alstead, Alstead Center, East Alstead, Forristalls Corner, Mill Hollow
Middleton	Town	Strafford	Town meeting	1,823	18.1	1778	Middleton Corners, New Portsmouth
Alexandria	Town	Grafton	Town meeting	1,776	43.0	1782	Alexandria, South Alexandria
Newfields	Town	Rockingham	Town meeting	1,769	7.0	1849	Littlefield, Newfields, Rockingham
Lyme	Town	Grafton	Town meeting	1,745	53.8	1761	Hardscrabble, Lyme, Lyme Center
Hancock	Town	Hillsborough	Town meeting	1,731	30.0	1779	Elmwood, Hancock
Greenfield	Town	Hillsborough	Town meeting	1,716	26.1	1791	Greenfield, Russell
Westmoreland	Town	Cheshire	Town meeting	1,706	35.9	1752	East Westmoreland, Gilboa, Park Hill, Poocham, Westmoreland, Westmoreland Depot
Lyndeborough	Town	Hillsborough	Town meeting	1,702	30.4	1764	Curtis Corner, Johnson Corner, Lyndeborough Center, Perham Corner, South Lyndeborough
Effingham	Town	Carroll	Town meeting	1,691	38.4	1778	Center Effingham, Chases Mill, Effingham (Lord's Hill), Effingham Falls, Grape Corner, Pine River, South Effingham, Drake's Corner
Freedom	Town	Carroll	Town meeting	1,689	35.0	1831	East Freedom, Four Corners, Freedom
Bradford	Town	Merrimack	Town meeting	1,662	35.3	1787	Box Corner, Bradford, Bradford Center
Lincoln	Town	Grafton	Town meeting (with town manager)	1,631	130.3	1764	Lincoln, North Lincoln, Stillwater (former)
Lisbon	Town	Grafton	Town meeting	1,621	26.2	1763	Barrett, Lisbon, Savageville
Cornish	Town	Sullivan	Town meeting	1,616	42.1	1765	Balloch, Cornish Center, Cornish City, Cornish Flat, Cornish Mills, South Cornish, Squag City
Francestown	Town	Hillsborough	Town meeting	1,610	30.2	1772	Francestown
Dublin	Town	Cheshire	Town meeting	1,532	28.0	1771	Bonds Corner, Dublin
Unity	Town	Sullivan	Town meeting	1,518	36.9	1764	East Unity, Quaker City, Unity, West Unity
Bennington	Town	Hillsborough	Town meeting	1,501	11.0	1842	Bennington
Rumney	Town	Grafton	Town meeting	1,498	41.7	1761	Quincy, Rumney, Rumney Depot, Stinson Lake, West Rumney
Sandwich	Town	Carroll	Town meeting	1,466	90.2	1763	Big Rock Corner, Center Sandwich, Chicks Corner, East Sandwich, North Sandwich, Sandwich (Lower Corner), Sandwich Landing, Wentworth Hill, Whiteface
Mason	Town	Hillsborough	Town meeting	1,448	23.9	1768	Mason, Pratt
Woodstock	Town	Grafton	Town meeting	1,434	58.7	1763	Fairview, Lost River, North Woodstock, Woodstock
Salisbury	Town	Merrimack	Town meeting	1,422	40.0	1768	Salisbury, Salisbury Heights, Scribners Corner, Smiths Corner, Thompson Corner, West Salisbury
Wilmot	Town	Merrimack	Town meeting	1,407	29.6	1807	North Wilmot, Wilmot, Wilmot Flat
Grafton	Town	Grafton	Town meeting	1,385	41.7	1778	East Grafton, Grafton, Grafton Center, Robinson Corner, Cardigan Station
Temple	Town	Hillsborough	Town meeting	1,382	22.2	1768	Temple
Stoddard	Town	Cheshire	Town meeting	1,374	50.9	1774	Leominster Corner, Mill Village, South Stoddard, Stoddard, Woods Mill
Milan	Town	Coös	Town meeting	1,358	63.8	1824	Copperville, Milan, West Milan
Springfield	Town	Sullivan	Town meeting	1,259	43.2	1794	East Springfield, Roby Corners, Springfield, Twin Lakes Village, Washburn Corner, West Springfield
Danbury	Town	Merrimack	Town meeting	1,250	37.5	1795	Converse Station, Danbury, Elmwood, Fords Crossing, Fords Mill, South Danbury
Orford	Town	Grafton	Town meeting	1,237	46.7	1761	Gilmans Corner, Orford, Orfordville, Quinttown
Richmond	Town	Cheshire	Town meeting	1,197	37.6	1752	North Richmond, Richmond
Washington	Town	Sullivan	Town meeting	1,192	45.4	1776	East Washington, Washington
Bridgewater	Town	Grafton	Town meeting	1,160	21.3	1788	Bridgewater
Lempster	Town	Sullivan	Town meeting	1,118	32.3	1761	Dodge Hollow, East Lempster, Keyes Hollow, Lempster
Franconia	Town	Grafton	Town meeting	1,083	65.7	1764	Franconia, Mittersill
Bath	Town	Grafton	Town meeting	1,077	37.7	1761	Bath, Mountain Lakes (north part), Nutter, Pettyboro, Swiftwater, Upper Village, West Bath
Jefferson	Town	Coös	Town meeting	1,043	50.2	1796	Baileys, Highlands, Jefferson, Jefferson Highland, Riverton, Starr King, Waumbeck Junction, Cherry Mountain, Meadows
Center Harbor	Town	Belknap	Town meeting	1,040	13.4	1797	Center Harbor, West Center Harbor
Jackson	Town	Carroll	Town meeting	1,028	66.9	1800	Ducks Head, Dundee, Jackson, Jackson Falls, Panno Place
Hill	Town	Merrimack	Town meeting	1,017	26.7	1778	Hill, Hill Center, Murray Hill, South Alexandria
New Castle	Town	Rockingham	Town meeting	1,000	0.8	1693	New Castle
Harrisville	Town	Cheshire	Town meeting	984	18.6	1870	Chesham, Eastview, Harrisville
Dalton	Town	Coös	Town meeting	933	27.5	1784	Cushman, Dalton, Scott
South Hampton	Town	Rockingham	Town meeting	894	7.9	1742	Currierville, Jewell Town, Smith's Corner, South Hampton, Towles Corner
Monroe	Town	Grafton	Town meeting	864	22.3	1854	Monroe
Acworth	Town	Sullivan	Town meeting	853	38.9	1766	Acworth, Crescent Lake, East Acworth, Lynn, South Acworth
Wentworth	Town	Grafton	Town meeting	845	41.4	1766	Wentworth
Warren	Town	Grafton	Town meeting	825	48.5	1763	Breezy Point, Glencliff, Warren
Carroll	Town	Coös	Town meeting	820	50.2	1832	Bretton Woods, Carroll, Crawford House, Fabyan, Quebec Junction, Twin Mountain
Surry	Town	Cheshire	Town meeting	820	15.6	1769	Shaws Corner, Surry
Stewartstown	Town	Coös	Town meeting	813	46.2	1795	Stewartstown, Stewartstown Hollow, West Stewartstown
Newington	Town	Rockingham	Town meeting	811	8.2	1764	Newington, Newington Station, Piscataqua, South Newington
Croydon	Town	Sullivan	Town meeting	801	36.7	1763	Croydon, Croydon Flat, Croydon Four Corners, Ryder Corner
Pittsburg	Town	Coös	Town meeting	800	281.4	1840	Happy Corner, Idlewilde, Pittsburg, The Glen
Goshen	Town	Sullivan	Town meeting	796	22.5	1791	Goshen, Goshen Four Corners
Piermont	Town	Grafton	Town meeting	769	38.5	1764	Piermont
Albany	Town	Carroll	Town meeting	759	73.6	1766	Ferncroft, Passaconaway, Paugus Mill
Brookfield	Town	Carroll	Town meeting	755	22.9	1794	Brookfield, Stoneham Corners
Gilsum	Town	Cheshire	Town meeting	752	16.7	1763	Gilsum, Lower Village, Roundys Corner
Marlow	Town	Cheshire	Town meeting	749	26.0	1761	Baker Corner, Gee Mill, Marlow, Marlow Junction
Stratford	Town	Coös	Town meeting	662	79.5	1773	Beatties, East Stratford, Mapleton, Masons, North Stratford, Stratford Center, Stratford Hollow
Columbia	Town	Coös	Town meeting	659	60.3	1797	Bungy, Columbia, Cones, Georges, Meriden Hill, Tinkerville
Sullivan	Town	Cheshire	Town meeting	658	18.5	1787	East Sullivan, Ellisville, Sullivan
Langdon	Town	Sullivan	Town meeting	651	16.3	1787	Condon Corner, Langdon
Sugar Hill	Town	Grafton	Town meeting	647	17.0	1962	Sugar Hill
Hebron	Town	Grafton	Town meeting	632	16.5	1792	East Hebron, Hebron, Nuttings Beach
Nelson	Town	Cheshire	Town meeting	629	21.9	1774	Munsonville, Nelson
Lyman	Town	Grafton	Town meeting	585	28.5	1761	Dodge Pond, Parker Hill, Tinkerville
Groton	Town	Grafton	Town meeting	569	40.8	1761	Groton, North Groton
Waterville Valley	Town	Grafton	Town meeting	508	64.9	1829	Waterville Valley
Stark	Town	Coös	Town meeting	478	58.7	1795	Crystal, Percy, Stark
Landaff	Town	Grafton	Town meeting	446	28.4	1774	Ireland, Jericho, Jockey Hill, Landaff Center
Eaton	Town	Carroll	Town meeting	405	24.3	1766	Eaton Center, Snowville
Benton	Town	Grafton	Town meeting	374	48.2	1764	Benton, Boutin Corner, Coventry
Sharon	Town	Hillsborough	Town meeting	359	15.6	1791	Sharon
Shelburne	Town	Coös	Town meeting	353	47.9	1820	Shelburne
Chatham	Town	Carroll	Town meeting	341	56.7	1767	Chatham, North Chatham, South Chatham
Dorchester	Town	Grafton	Town meeting	339	44.7	1761	Bucks Corner, Cheever, Dorchester, North Dorchester
Randolph	Town	Coös	Town meeting	328	47.1	1824	Appalachia, Bowman, Randolph, Randolph Hill, Scates Corner
Dummer	Town	Coös	Town meeting	306	48.2	1848	Dummer, Paris
Errol	Town	Coös	Town meeting	298	60.6	1836	Errol
Clarksville	Town	Coös	Town meeting	294	60.1	1853	
Easton	Town	Grafton	Town meeting	292	31.2	1876	Easton, Wildwood
Orange	Town	Grafton	Town meeting	277	23.2	1790	Orange
Windsor	Town	Hillsborough	Town meeting	262	8.3	1798	Windsor
Roxbury	Town	Cheshire	Town meeting	220	11.9	1812	Roxbury Center
Ellsworth	Town	Grafton	Town meeting	93	21.4	1802	Ellsworth
Hart's Location	Town	Carroll	Town meeting	68	18.7	1795	Notchland, Sawyers River, Willey House

== See also ==
- List of counties in New Hampshire
- List of places in New Hampshire
- Lists of cities in the United States
- New Hampshire communities by household income
- New Hampshire locations by per capita income
