= Rowes Corner =

Rowes Corner may refer to a location in the United States:

- Rowes Corner, Michigan
- Rowes Corner, Merrimack County, New Hampshire, in Hooksett
- Rowes Corner, in Newton, New Hampshire
