= Hooksett (CDP), New Hampshire =

Census-designated place in New Hampshire, United States

Hooksett, New Hampshire
- Census-designated place
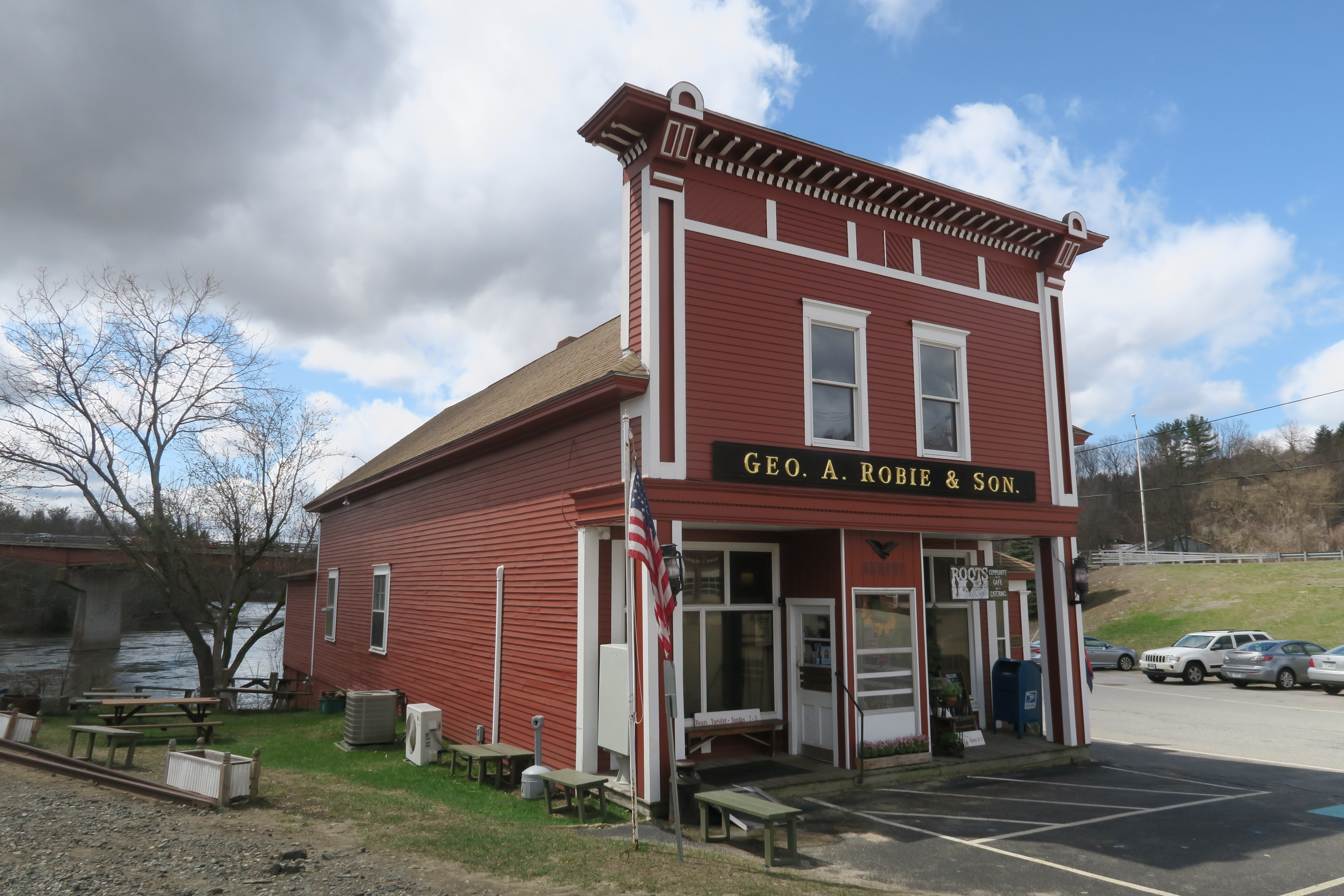
- Geo. A. Robie and Son, Hooksett NH.jpg

- Location within New Hampshire Location within the United States
- Coordinates: 43°05′35″N 71°27′25″W
- Country: United States
- State: New Hampshire
- County: Merrimack
- Town: Hooksett

Area
  - Total: 5.84 sq mi (15.13 km^{2})
  - Land: 5.40 sq mi (13.98 km^{2})
  - Water: 0.44 sq mi (1.15 km^{2})
- Elevation: 276 ft (84 m)

Population (2020)
  - Total: 5,283
  - Density: 978.6/sq mi (377.83/km^{2})
- Time zone: UTC-5 (Eastern (EST))
  - Summer (DST): UTC-4 (EDT)
- ZIP code: 03106
- Area code: 603
- FIPS code: 33-37220
- GNIS feature ID: 2378073

Hooksett is a census-designated place (CDP) in the town of Hooksett, New Hampshire, United States. The CDP includes the historic central village of Hooksett as well as suburban and rural land surrounding it. The population of the CDP was 5,283 at the 2020 census, out of 14,871 in the entire town.

== Geography ==
The CDP occupies the central to northern parts of the town of Hooksett, on both sides of the Merrimack River. The village of Hooksett is at the center of the CDP, where Main Street crosses the Merrimack. The CDP extends north to the Bow and Allenstown town lines and south to include the Granite Hill Villages housing development. Interstate 93 forms the western edge of the CDP, with access from Exit 11 at the Hooksett toll plaza, and U.S. Route 3 runs through the eastern side. New Hampshire Route 3A passes through the center of the CDP along the west side of the Merrimack River. Hooksett is bordered to the north by the Suncook CDP in the town of Allenstown.

Concord, the state capital, is 9 miles (14 km) to the north via I-93 or NH 3A and 10 miles (16 km) to the north via US 3, while Manchester, the largest city in the state, is 8 miles (13 km) to the south.

According to the U.S. Census Bureau, the Hooksett CDP has a total area of 5.8 square miles (15.1 km^{2}), of which 5.4 square miles (14.0 km^{2}) are land and 0.4 square miles (1.1 km^{2}), or 7.60%, are water.

== Demographics ==
Historical population
Census	Pop.	Note	%±
1970	1,303		—
1980	1,868		43.4%
1990	2,573		37.7%
2000	3,609		40.3%
2010	4,147		14.9%
2020	5,283		27.4%
U.S. Decennial Census

As of the census of 2010, there were 4,147 people, 1,819 households, and 1,166 families residing in the CDP. There were 1,945 housing units, of which 126, or 6.5%, were vacant. The racial makeup of the CDP was 93.9% white, 1.6% African American, 0.1% Native American, 1.8% Asian, 0.1% Pacific Islander, 0.8% some other race, and 1.7% from two or more races. 2.3% of the population were Hispanic or Latino of any race.

Of the 1,819 households in the CDP, 27.3% had children under the age of 18 living with them, 49.1% were headed by married couples living together, 10.8% had a female householder with no husband present, and 35.9% were non-families. 26.7% of all households were made up of individuals, and 8.4% were someone living alone who was 65 years of age or older. The average household size was 2.28, and the average family size was 2.75.

19.7% of residents in the CDP were under the age of 18, 6.6% were from age 18 to 24, 28.2% were from 25 to 44, 30.6% were from 45 to 64, and 14.9% were 65 years of age or older. The median age was 41.9 years. For every 100 females, there were 89.3 males. For every 100 females age 18 and over, there were 87.5 males.

For the period 2011–15, the estimated median annual income for a household was $68,294, and the median income for a family was $74,658. Male full-time workers had a median income of $45,516 versus $46,434 for females. The per capita income for the CDP was $32,689. 3.8% of the population and 1.8% of families were below the poverty line, along with 0% of people under the age of 18 and 2.7% of people 65 or older.
