= Pinardville, New Hampshire =

Census-designated place in New Hampshire, United States

- Census-designated place
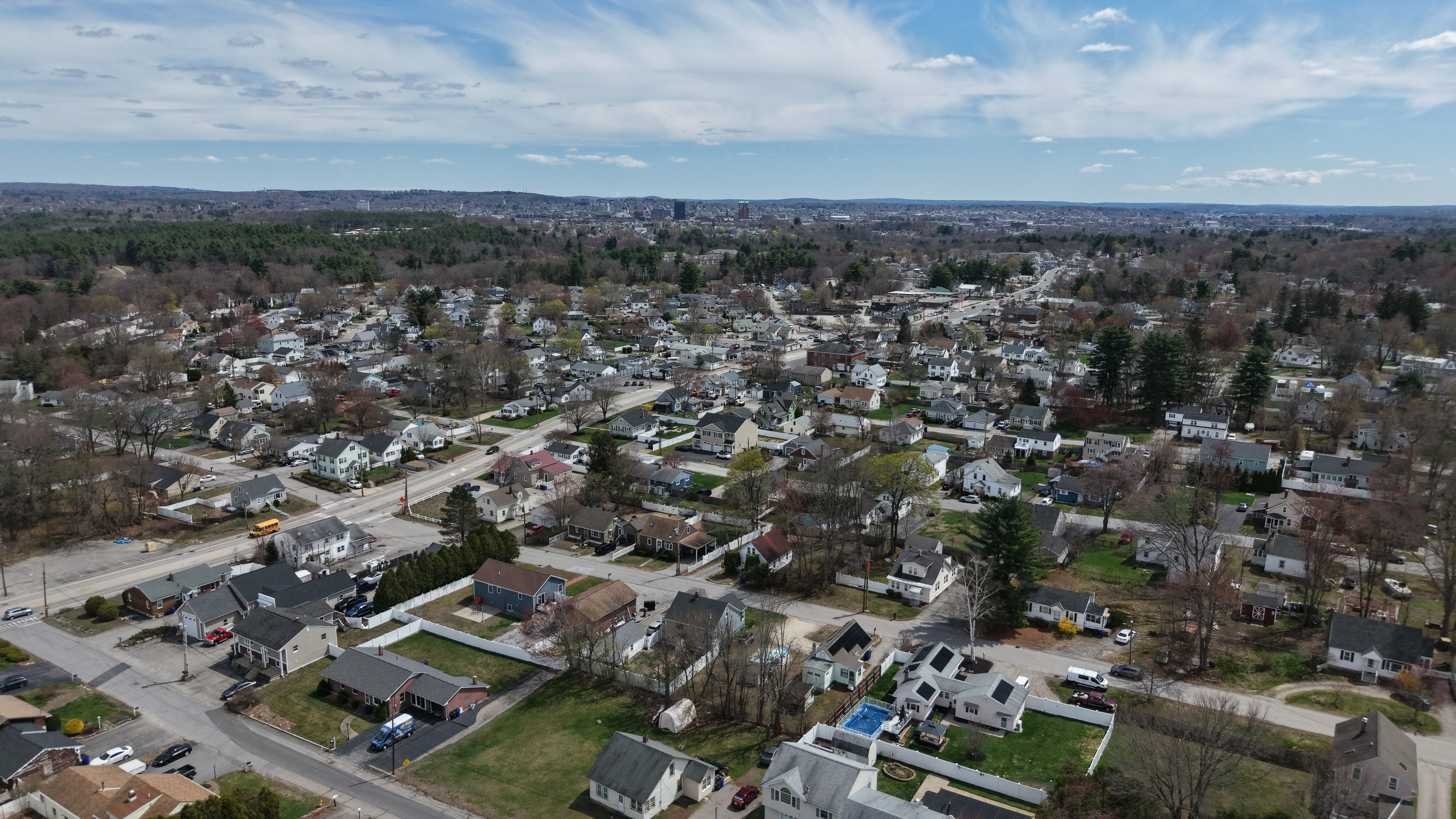
- Pinardville, New Hampshire, from the northwest

- Location within New Hampshire Location within the United States
- Coordinates: 42°59′42″N 71°30′31″W
- Country: United States
- State: New Hampshire
- County: Hillsborough
- Town: Goffstown

Area
  - Total: 1.81 sq mi (4.70 km^{2})
  - Land: 1.66 sq mi (4.31 km^{2})
  - Water: 0.15 sq mi (0.39 km^{2})
- Elevation: 266 ft (81 m)

Population (2020)
  - Total: 5,034
  - Density: 3,025.3/sq mi (1,168.06/km^{2})
- Time zone: UTC-5 (Eastern (EST))
  - Summer (DST): UTC-4 (EDT)
- ZIP Codes: 03102 (Manchester); 03045 (Goffstown)
- Area code: 603
- FIPS code: 33-61220
- GNIS feature ID: 0869156

Pinardville is a census-designated place (CDP) in the town of Goffstown, New Hampshire, United States. It is a suburban neighborhood adjacent to the city of Manchester. The population was 5,034 at the 2020 census. Pinardville has existed since 1906.

== History ==
In 1906, Edmond Pinard (1857–1933), a grocer by trade, developed real-estate holdings on the Manchester/Goffstown town line. Pinard was a French Canadian born in Sainte Monique parish, Nicolet, Quebec, who arrived in New Hampshire in the 1870s and brought many French Canadians to the area. The area was known at the time as "Pinards Ville". It has grown substantially since then, but many of the original families still live in the area.

== Geography ==
Pinardville is located in the southeastern part of Goffstown at 42°59′47″N 71°30′30″W (42.996283, -71.508452). It is bordered to the east by the Manchester city line and to the north by the Piscataquog River. The campus of St. Anselm College is just outside the CDP, south of Saint Anselm Drive. The CDP extends west to the New Hampshire Route 114 bypass and then out South Mast Road as far as Henry Bridge Road.

Route 114 leads west out Mast Road 4 miles (6 km) to Goffstown village and southeast 3.5 miles (5.6 km) to New Hampshire Route 101 in Bedford. New Hampshire Route 114A follows Mast Road through the center of Pinardville and leads southeast 2 miles (3 km) to South Main Street in the West Side of Manchester.

According to the United States Census Bureau, the Pinardville CDP has a total area of 1.8 square miles (4.7 km^{2}), of which 1.7 square miles (4.3 km^{2}) are land and 0.2 square miles (0.4 km^{2}), or 8.39%, are water.

== Demographics ==
Historical population
Census	Pop.	Note	%±
1990	4,654		—
2000	5,779		24.2%
2010	4,780		−17.3%
2020	5,034		5.3%
U.S. Decennial Census

=== 2020 census ===
As of the 2020 census, Pinardville had a population of 5,034. The median age was 40.7 years. 18.2% of residents were under the age of 18 and 16.6% of residents were 65 years of age or older. For every 100 females there were 90.2 males, and for every 100 females age 18 and over there were 88.3 males age 18 and over.

97.4% of residents lived in urban areas, while 2.6% lived in rural areas.

There were 2,139 households in Pinardville, of which 25.2% had children under the age of 18 living in them. Of all households, 45.4% were married-couple households, 17.4% were households with a male householder and no spouse or partner present, and 28.7% were households with a female householder and no spouse or partner present. About 28.9% of all households were made up of individuals and 11.0% had someone living alone who was 65 years of age or older.

There were 2,187 housing units, of which 2.2% were vacant. The homeowner vacancy rate was 0.0% and the rental vacancy rate was 1.8%.

Racial composition as of the 2020 census
Race	Number	Percent
White	4,449	88.4%
Black or African American	100	2.0%
American Indian and Alaska Native	14	0.3%
Asian	120	2.4%
Native Hawaiian and Other Pacific Islander	3	0.1%
Some other race	75	1.5%
Two or more races	273	5.4%
Hispanic or Latino (of any race)	253	5.0%

=== 2010 census ===
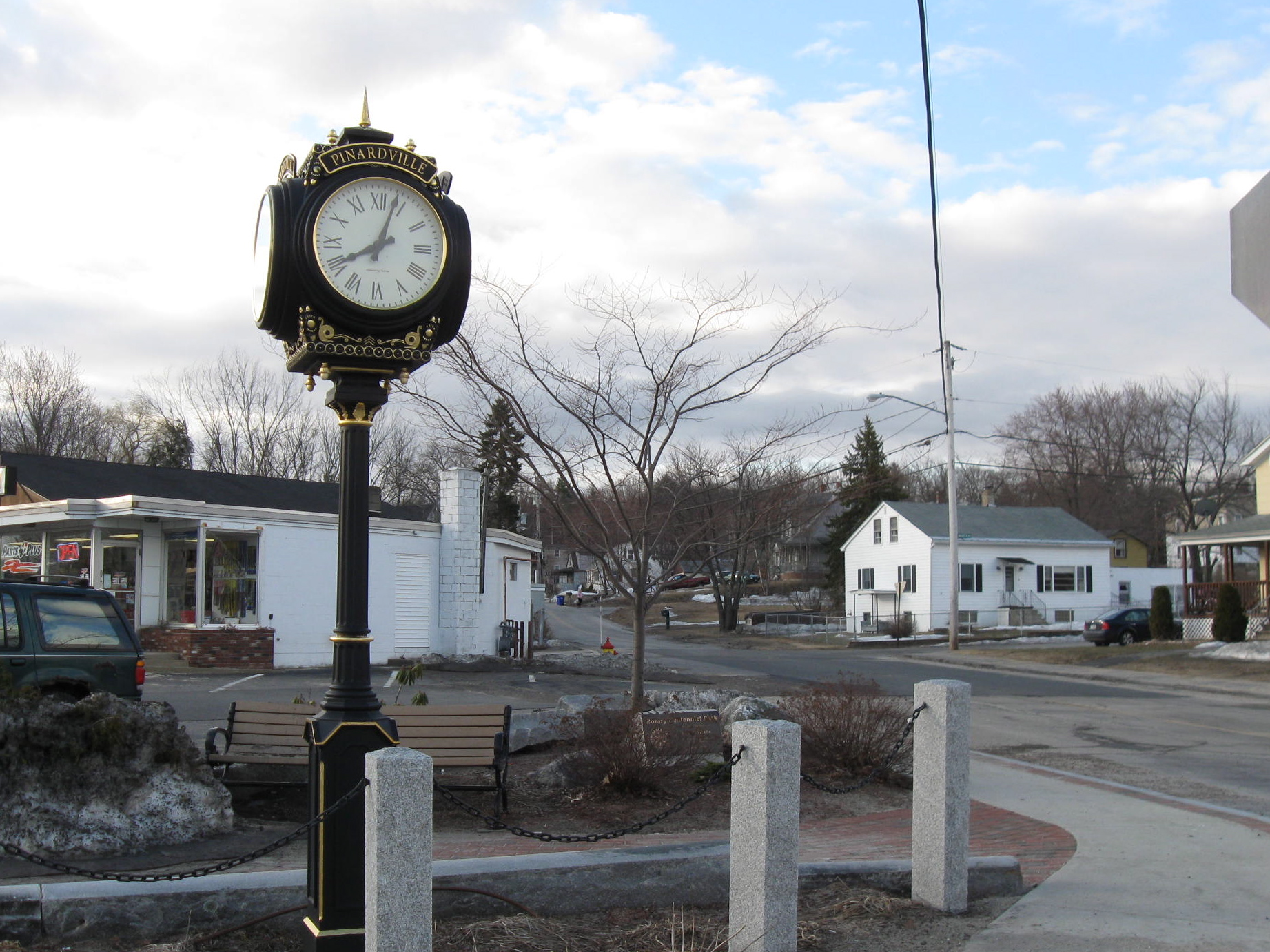
Center of Pinardville

As of the census of 2010, there were 4,780 people, 1,942 households, and 1,242 families residing in the CDP. There were 2,036 housing units, of which 94, or 4.6%, were vacant. The racial makeup of the CDP was 95.1% white, 1.5% African American, 0.2% Native American, 1.3% Asian, 0.04% Pacific Islander, 0.7% some other race, and 1.2% from two or more races. 2.5% of the population were Hispanic or Latino of any race.

Of the 1,942 households in the CDP, 28.8% had children under the age of 18 living with them, 46.8% were headed by married couples living together, 12.5% had a female householder with no husband present, and 36.0% were non-families. 28.0% of all households were made up of individuals, and 10.2% were someone living alone who was 65 years of age or older. The average household size was 2.36, and the average family size was 2.89.

19.6% of residents in the CDP were under the age of 18, 9.3% were from age 18 to 24, 28.8% were from 25 to 44, 28.7% were from 45 to 64, and 13.5% were 65 years of age or older. The median age was 39.4 years. For every 100 females, there were 85.4 males. For every 100 females age 18 and over, there were 83.7 males.

=== Income and poverty ===
For the period 2011–15, the estimated median annual income for a household was $58,355, and the median income for a family was $76,490. Male full-time workers had a median income of $46,675 versus $43,721 for females. The per capita income for the CDP was $28,121. 10.0% of the population and 7.4% of families were below the poverty line, along with 11.2% of people under the age of 18 and 2.2% of people 65 or older.

== Education ==
It is in the Goffstown School District. This district is a part of School Administrative Unit 19.
