= Poocham, New Hampshire =

Unincorporated community in New Hampshire, United States

- Unincorporated community
- Location within New Hampshire Location within the United States
- Coordinates: 42°57′02″N 72°28′38″W
- Country: United States
- State: New Hampshire
- County: Cheshire
- Town: Westmoreland
- Elevation: 676 ft (206 m)
- Time zone: UTC-5 (Eastern (EST))
  - Summer (DST): UTC-4 (EDT)
- Area code: 603
- GNIS feature ID: 869299

Poocham is an unincorporated community in the town of Westmoreland in Cheshire County, New Hampshire, United States, near the larger communities of Keene, New Hampshire and Brattleboro, Vermont.

Poocham's oldest houses date from around 1800. By reputation, the name Poocham comes from an Abenaki Indian word meaning "gathering place". The community is almost entirely composed of homes and farms, but a small fluorite mine (called William Wise Mine) and growing vineyard (called Poocham Hill Winery) are also present.

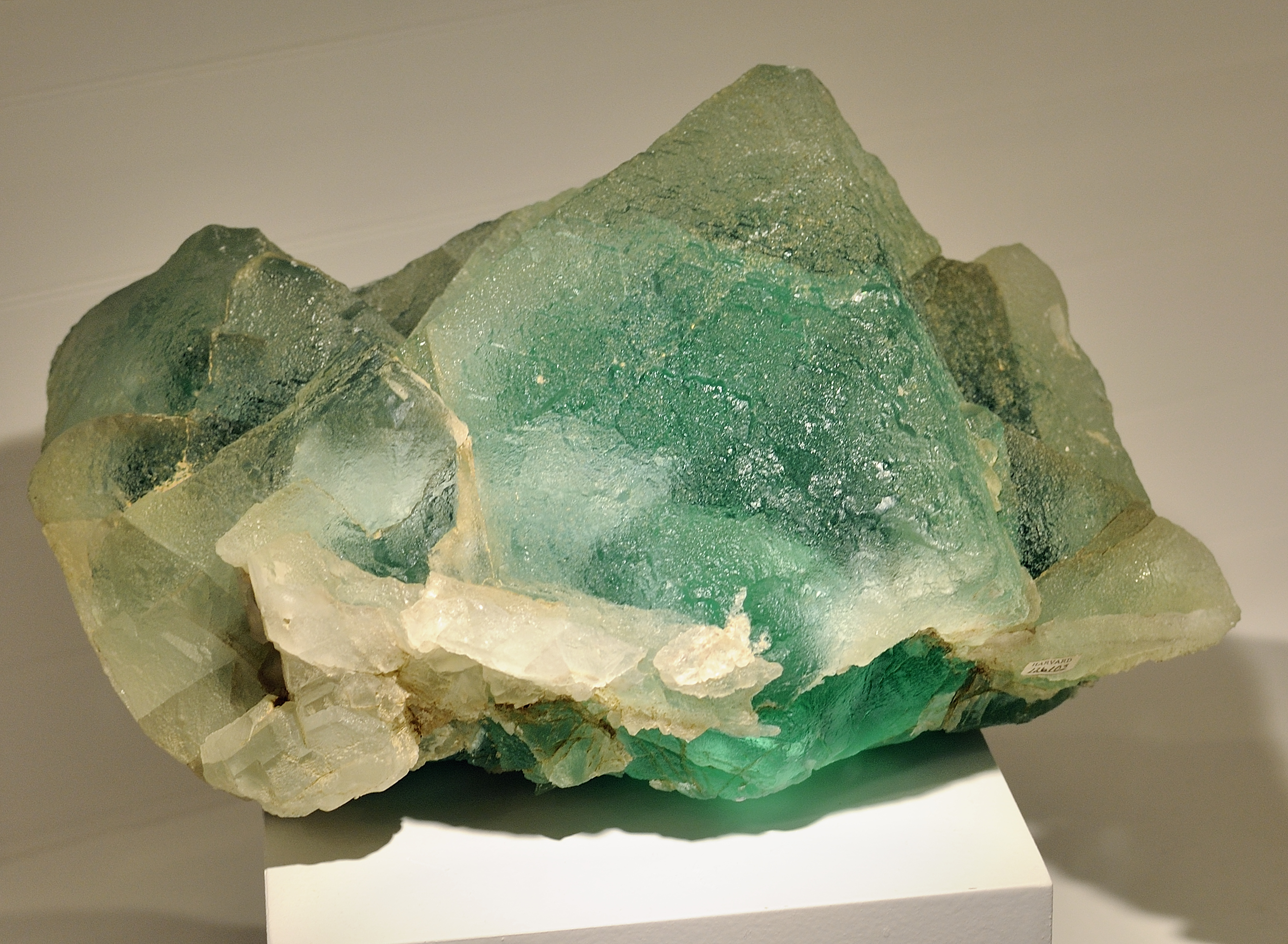
Fluorite rock from William Wise Mine
