= Gerrish, New Hampshire =

Neighborhood in Boscawen, New Hampshire

- Gerrish Depot
- Interactive map of Gerrish
- Country: United States
- State: New Hampshire
- County: Merrimack
- Town: Boscawen
- Named for: Gerrish family
- Elevation: 472 ft (144 m)
- Time zone: UTC−5 (Eastern (EST))
  - Summer (DST): UTC−4 (EDT)
- ZIP Code: 03303
- Area code: 603
- GNIS feature ID: 871180

Gerrish is an unincorporated community in the town of Boscawen, New Hampshire, United States. It is located on U.S. Route 3, the Daniel Webster Highway, at approximately 43.36614° N, 71.65119° W.

== History ==
Gerrish's history began in 1855, when a station was built on the Northern Railroad. It was initially known as the North Boscawen Depot, until 1909, after a fatal train crash sparked by confusion over similar station names, along with several other depots on that Northern Railroad line. It was renamed Gerrish Depot after a prominent farming family in the area. The depot provided freight and passenger services for the residents of Boscawen, the state nursery, and the county jail, and the county nursing home until 1955. The Gerrish name stuck, and its history is commemorated by New Hampshire Historical marker No. 256, titled Gerrish Depot, which was erected in 2017.

== Geography ==
Gerrish is located near Stirrup Iron Brook and Glines Brook, at the building complex that contains the Merrimack County Nursing Home, the Merrimack County House of Corrections, and the Merrimack County Sheriff's Office. It is located along the Merrimack River.

== See also ==
- Merrimack River
- New Hampshire Historical marker No. 256
