= West Peterborough, New Hampshire =

Unincorporated community in New Hampshire, United States

- Unincorporated community
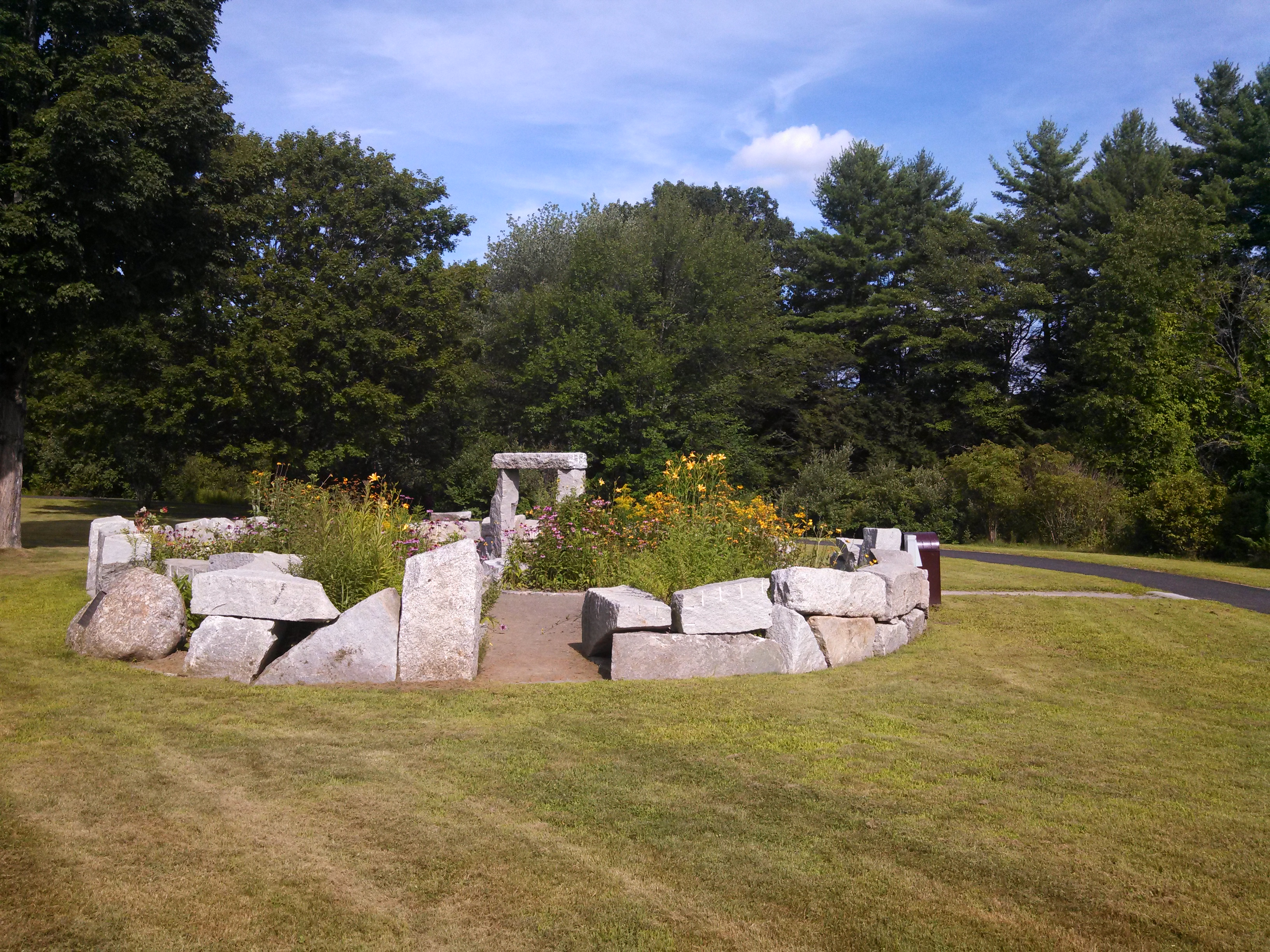
- Teixeira Park

- Location within New Hampshire Location within the United States
- Coordinates: 42°53′12″N 71°59′05″W
- Country: United States
- State: New Hampshire
- County: Hillsborough
- Town: Peterborough
- Elevation: 863 ft (263 m)
- Time zone: UTC-5 (Eastern (EST))
  - Summer (DST): UTC-4 (EDT)
- ZIP code: 03468
- Area code: 603
- GNIS feature ID: 870786

West Peterborough is an unincorporated community in the town of Peterborough in Hillsborough County, New Hampshire, United States. It is located along Nubanusit Brook in the western part of the town. Union Street leads 2 miles (3 km) east to the Peterborough town center and 0.6 miles (1.0 km) south to New Hampshire Route 101, a highway connecting Keene to the west with Milford to the east.

West Peterborough has a separate ZIP code (03468) from the rest of Peterborough. The community's population, however, is included in the Peterborough census-designated place, comprising the central settled area of the town.
