= Lees Mill, New Hampshire =

Unincorporated community in New Hampshire, United States

- Unincorporated community
- Location within New Hampshire Location within the United States
- Coordinates: 43°44′21″N 71°23′23″W
- Country: United States
- State: New Hampshire
- County: Carroll
- Town: Moultonborough
- Elevation: 518 ft (158 m)
- Time zone: UTC-5 (Eastern (EST))
  - Summer (DST): UTC-4 (EDT)
- Area code: 603
- GNIS feature ID: 871198

Lees Mill is an unincorporated community in the town of Moultonborough, in Carroll County, New Hampshire, United States. It is located adjacent to the outlet of Lees Pond, directly upstream from the northernmost point of Lake Winnipesaukee.
