= Martins Corner, New Hampshire =

Unincorporated community in Hooksett, New Hampshire

Martins Corner Martin's Corner, Martin Corner, Martin's Ferry
- Unincorporated community
- Location of Martins Corner in Merrimack County
- Time zone: UTC-5 (Eastern Standard Time)
- ZIP Code: 03106
- Area code: 603
- GNIS feature ID: 868290
- Census code: 45980

Martins Corner is an unincorporated community in the town of Hooksett, New Hampshire, near the Manchester city border.

== Geography ==
Martins Corner is located in the northern part of South Hooksett. It is centered on the intersection between Whitehall Road (New Hampshire Route 27) and Londonderry Turnpike (New Hampshire Route 28 Bypass). Dalton Brook passes north of the intersection, and Campbell Hill rises farther to the north. Whitehall Road (NH 27) ends at U.S. Route 3 just west of Martins Corner; the road continues west from US 3 as Martin's Ferry Road, leading to the community of Martin, a location along the Merrimack River at the Hooksett/Manchester border.

== See also ==
- South Hooksett, New Hampshire
- Hooksett, New Hampshire
