= Rockywold–Deephaven Camps =

- U.S. National Register of Historic Places
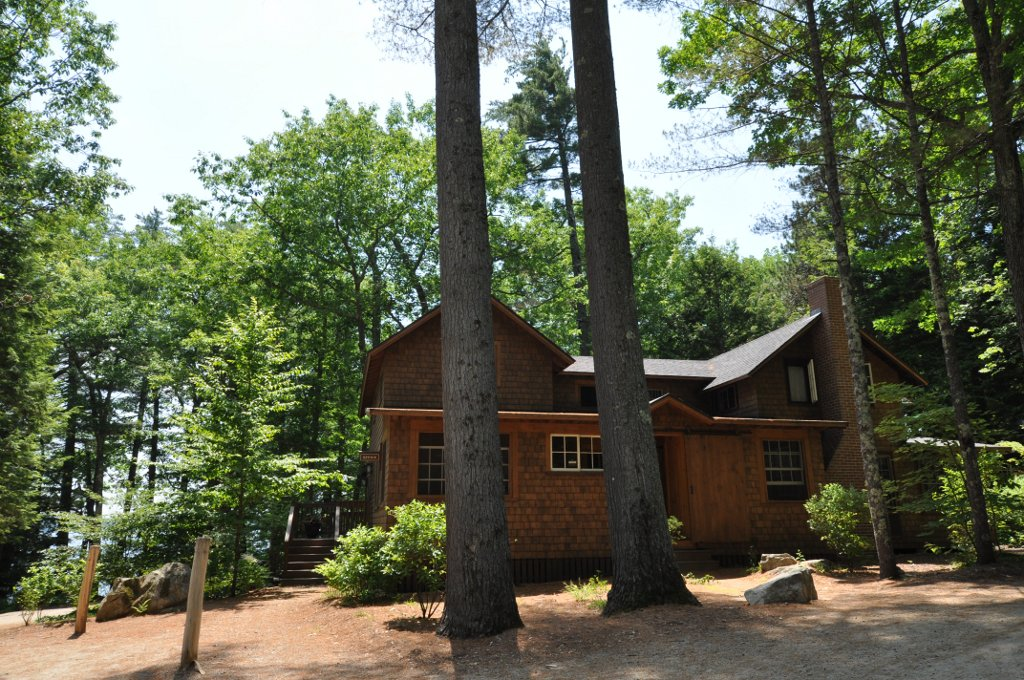
- One of the buildings at Rockywold

- Location within New Hampshire Location within the United States
- Location: Pinehurst Road, Holderness, New Hampshire
- Coordinates: 43°46′35″N 71°32′36″W
- Area: 391 acres (158 ha)
- MPS: Squam MPS
- NRHP reference No.: 13000382
- Added to NRHP: June 14, 2013

The Rockywold–Deephaven Camps (RDC) is a historic family summer camp on Squam Lake in Holderness, New Hampshire. Now operated as a single facility, the camp began life as two adjacent camps. Rockywold Camp was established in 1901 by Mary Alice Armstrong and Deephaven in 1897 by Alice Mabel Bacon. Since 1918 the camps have been under combined administration, first under control of Mrs. Armstrong and the Howe family, and now under an organization owned primarily by the camp's returning guests. The camps have been a major influence on the development of Squam Lake as a summer destination, with many of its early campers returning to the lake (if not the camps) for many years. The camp grounds and facilities have been listed on the National Register of Historic Places.

The camps are located in northern Holderness, near the northwest tip of Squam Lake, on a pair of peninsulas separate by an inlet known to campers as The Bight. The camp occupies 103 acres (42 ha) of land, most of which is on the mainland, but also includes a few small islands in the lake. (The National Register listing also includes 288 acres (117 ha) of the lake itself, between the mainland and those islands.) There are more than 60 residential cottages at the camp, as well as two lodges, two dining halls, and numerous smaller service-related facilities. The cottages are all distinct constructions, with many set along a portion of the camp's 8,000 feet (2,400 m) of shoreline. All are of wood-frame construction. Recreational facilities at the camp, in addition to water-based activities, include tennis and basketball courts. The camp's shareholders announced in May 2020 that RDC would not be open for the 2020 summer season, the first time it has not opened in its 123-year history.

== See also ==
- National Register of Historic Places listings in Grafton County, New Hampshire
