= Rowes Corner, Merrimack County, New Hampshire =

Village in Hooksett, New Hampshire

Rowes Corner
- Unincorporated community
- Location of Rowes Corner in Merrimack County
- Interactive map of Rowes Corner
- Time zone: UTC-5 (Eastern Standard Time)
- ZIP Code: 03106
- Area code: 603
- GNIS feature ID: 869631
- Census code: 65620

Rowes Corner is an unincorporated community in the town of Hooksett, New Hampshire, United States, situated near the eastern border of the town.

== Geography ==
Rowes Corner is centered on Rowes Corner Lane, just north of the intersection between New Hampshire Route 27 (Whitehall Road) and Chester Turnpike. Maple Falls Brook, a tributary of Tower Hill Pond and part of the Cohas Brook watershed, drains Dubes Pond to the west of Rowes Corner and passes to the south of the community. Moose Brook enters Maple Falls Brook from the east just south of the community. Rowes Corner has a Geographic Names Information System feature code of 869631.

== See also ==
- Hooksett, New Hampshire
- South Hooksett, New Hampshire
