= Sawyer Woolen Mills =

- U.S. National Register of Historic Places
- U.S. Historic district
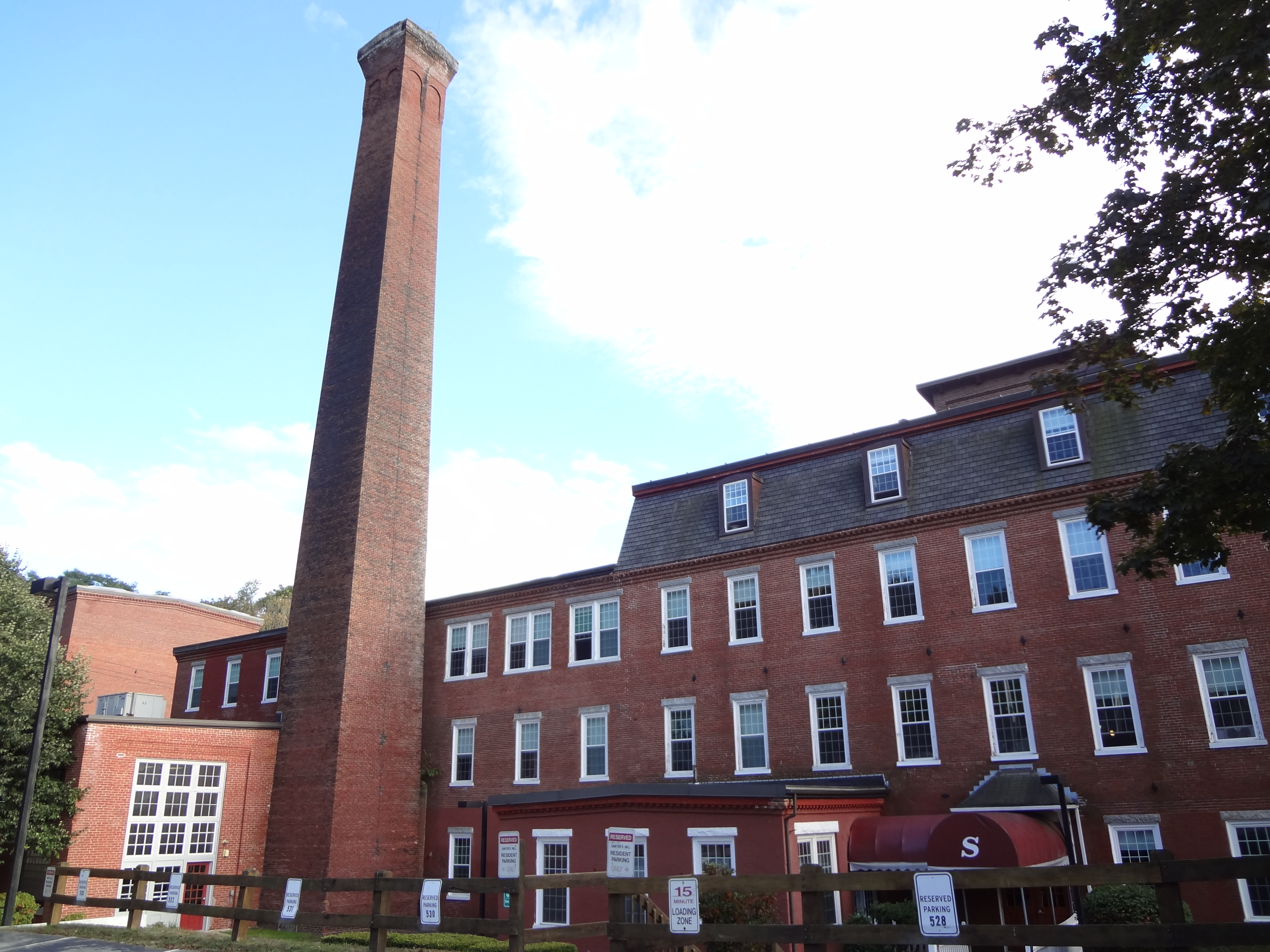

- Location within New Hampshire Location within the United States
- Location: 1 Mill St., Dover, New Hampshire
- Coordinates: 43°10′44″N 70°52′35″W
- Area: 8.5 acres (3.4 ha)
- Architectural style: Second Empire, Lombard Romanesque
- NRHP reference No.: 89001208
- Added to NRHP: September 13, 1989

The Sawyer Woolen Mills is a historic textile mill complex at 1 Mill Street in Dover, New Hampshire. Built in stages between 1873 and 1939, the mill complex is one of New Hampshire's most intact mill complexes, reflecting multiple architectural styles which were retained by addition to the complex rather than by the demolition of older buildings. The mills were listed on the National Register of Historic Places in 1989.

== Description ==
The mill complex occupies 8.5 acres (3.4 ha) on the banks of the Bellamy River, adjacent to the Spaulding Turnpike south of downtown Dover. It consists of 15 major buildings, two dams, and four bridges. Only three smaller buildings have been destroyed. There are four large mill buildings in which the textile processing took place, lining the banks of the river, two of which are joined by an ell that spans the river. On the east side of the complex are a series of four warehouses. The 1882 office building is one of the finest mill offices in New England of the period, retaining significant interior decorative detail. The designers of most of the mill buildings are unknown, but the office was designed by Charles E. Joy, a local architect.

== History ==
The Sawyer Woolen Mill Company was established in 1824, and are believed to be the third woolen mill in the state. By 1883 it was the largest manufacturer of woolens in the state, a position it held until it was eclipsed by the Amoskeag Manufacturing Company of Manchester around 1900. The company was founded by Alfred I. Sawyer and operated in the family until 1899, when it went bankrupt and was acquired by the American Woolen Company. The mill complex was operated by American until it was closed and sold off in 1955. In the mid-1980s the complex was converted to residential use.

== See also ==
- National Register of Historic Places listings in Strafford County, New Hampshire
