= Smith's Corner Historic District =

Historic district in New Hampshire, United States

- U.S. National Register of Historic Places
- U.S. Historic district
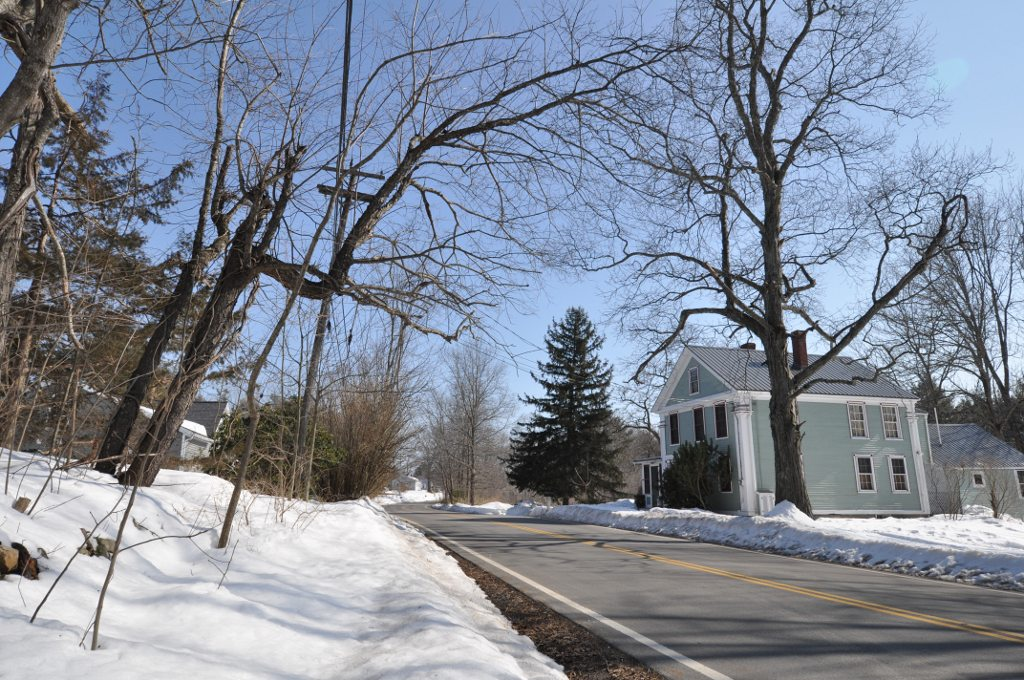
- NH 107A at Smith's Corner

- Location within New Hampshire Location within the United States
- Location: Main Ave., South, Stagecoach, and Chase Rds., South Hampton, New Hampshire
- Coordinates: 42°53′28″N 70°59′30″W
- Area: 105.5 acres (42.7 ha)
- Architect: Multiple
- Architectural style: Mixed (more Than 2 Styles From Different Periods)
- MPS: South Hampton MRA
- NRHP reference No.: 83001149
- Added to NRHP: April 11, 1983

The Smith's Corner Historic District is a historic district encompassing a historic 19th-century rural village center. Covering about 105.5 acres (42.7 ha), the district is centered on the junction of Main Avenue (New Hampshire Route 107A), South Road, and Chase Road in northwestern South Hampton, abutting its border with East Kingston. The village was important as a stagecoach stop. The district was listed on the National Register of Historic Places in 1983.

== Description and history ==
Smith's Corner is located in northwestern South Hampton, a rural community in southeastern New Hampshire. New Hampshire Route 107A, Main Avenue in South Hampton, was historically a stagecoach route connecting Amesbury and Newburyport, Massachusetts to Kingston, New Hampshire. This part of South Hampton was agricultural from its settlement in the 18th century, but when the stage route was opened in the 19th century, it developed as a service stop on that route. It featurered several taverns, of which the Smith House at Main Avenue and Stagecoach Lane is one that still survives. The George Goodwin House, located a short way west of that junction, was also given a tavern license. Other properties around the junction were used in other aspects of service in the stagecoach industry.

The buildings in the district are all now residential and/or agricultural in use. The district includes one of South Hampton's oldest houses, the c. 1750 Moses Eaton House on Stagecoach Road, and several other 18th-century Georgian houses. The Eaton House is a particularly well-preserved example of a New England connected farmstead. The most prominent buildings were built in the mid-19th century for the stage trade, and are Greek Revival character.

== See also ==
- National Register of Historic Places listings in Rockingham County, New Hampshire
