= Hooksett, New Hampshire =

- Town
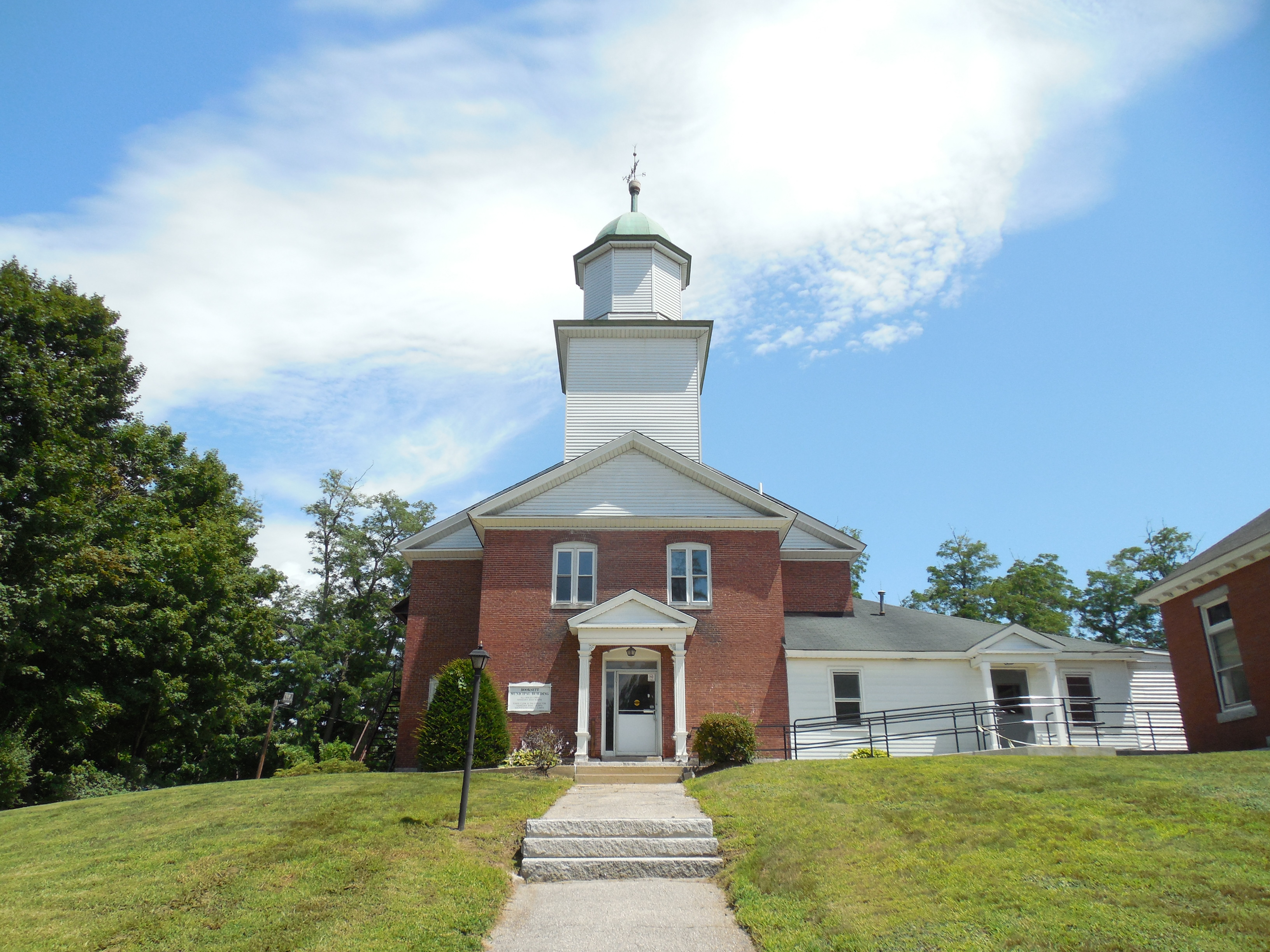
- Hooksett Municipal Building

- Seal

- Location in Merrimack County and the state of New Hampshire
- Coordinates: 43°05′35″N 71°27′25″W
- Country: United States
- State: New Hampshire
- County: Merrimack
- Incorporated: 1822
- Villages: Hooksett; Martins Corner; Rowes Corner; South Hooksett

Area
  - Total: 37.1 sq mi (96.2 km^{2})
  - Land: 36.1 sq mi (93.4 km^{2})
  - Water: 1.1 sq mi (2.8 km^{2}) 2.88%
- Elevation: 315 ft (96 m)

Population (2020)
  - Total: 14,871
  - Density: 412/sq mi (159.2/km^{2})
- Time zone: UTC−5 (Eastern)
  - Summer (DST): UTC−4 (Eastern)
- ZIP code: 03106
- Area code: 603
- FIPS code: 33-37300
- GNIS feature ID: 873629
- Website: www.hooksett.org

Hooksett is a town in Merrimack County, New Hampshire, United States. The population was 14,871 at the 2020 census, up from 13,451 at the 2010 census. The town is located between Manchester, the state's largest city, and Concord, the state capital. A prominent landmark is Robie's Country Store, a National Historic Landmark and a frequent stop for presidential candidates during the New Hampshire primary.

The central village in town, where 5,283 people resided at the 2020 census, is defined as the Hooksett census-designated place and is located at a bridge crossing of the Merrimack River. The town also contains the census-designated place of South Hooksett.

== History ==
Hooksett was incorporated in 1822. First known as "Chester Woods" and "Rowe's Corner", the community was called "Hooksett" for nearly 50 years before being incorporated. The name may have come from a hook-shaped island in the Merrimack or from early fishermen, who called the area "Hookline Falls". Rocky ledges flank the Merrimack River, and there were several cross-river ferries located here, as well as lumber mills and a brick-making establishment powered by the falls. The first census, taken in 1830, reported 880 residents.

The first settlement in the area was Martins Ferry near the Merrimack River and what is today's Southern New Hampshire University. The name comes from the Martin family who owned the ferry and the land around the area for decades. Today, Martins Corner 1 mile (1.6 km) to the east bears the name. In 1794, the lottery-funded Hooksett Canal became part of the transportation facilities of the Amoskeag cotton mills in Manchester.

== Geography ==
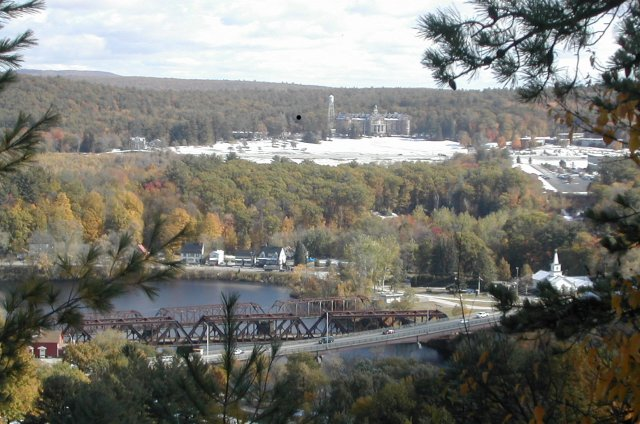
Hooksett Village from the Pinnacle

Hooksett is situated on the Merrimack River in south-central New Hampshire. Interstate 93 connects Hooksett to the White Mountains and Boston. Hooksett lies fully within the Merrimack River watershed.

According to the United States Census Bureau, the town has a total area of 37.1 square miles (96.2 km^{2}), of which 36.1 square miles (93.4 km^{2}) are land and 1.1 square miles (2.8 km^{2}) are water, comprising 2.88% of the town.

The highest point in Hooksett is Quimby Mountain, at 902 feet (275 m) above sea level, near the town's western border. On the town's eastern border, a ridge ascending towards Hall Mountain in neighboring Candia reaches 900 feet (270 m) above sea level.

=== Adjacent municipalities ===
- Allenstown (north)
- Deerfield (northeast)
- Candia (east)
- Auburn (southeast)
- Manchester (south)
- Goffstown (southwest)
- Dunbarton (west)
- Bow (northwest)

== Demographics ==
Historical population
| Census | Pop. | Note | %± |
|---|---|---|---|
| 1830 | 880 | | — |
| 1840 | 1,175 | | 33.5% |
| 1850 | 1,503 | | 27.9% |
| 1860 | 1,257 | | −16.4% |
| 1870 | 1,330 | | 5.8% |
| 1880 | 1,766 | | 32.8% |
| 1890 | 1,893 | | 7.2% |
| 1900 | 1,665 | | −12.0% |
| 1910 | 1,528 | | −8.2% |
| 1920 | 1,828 | | 19.6% |
| 1930 | 2,132 | | 16.6% |
| 1940 | 2,273 | | 6.6% |
| 1950 | 2,792 | | 22.8% |
| 1960 | 3,713 | | 33.0% |
| 1970 | 5,564 | | 49.9% |
| 1980 | 7,303 | | 31.3% |
| 1990 | 8,767 | | 20.0% |
| 2000 | 11,721 | | 33.7% |
| 2010 | 13,451 | | 14.8% |
| 2020 | 14,871 | | 10.6% |
U.S. Decennial Census

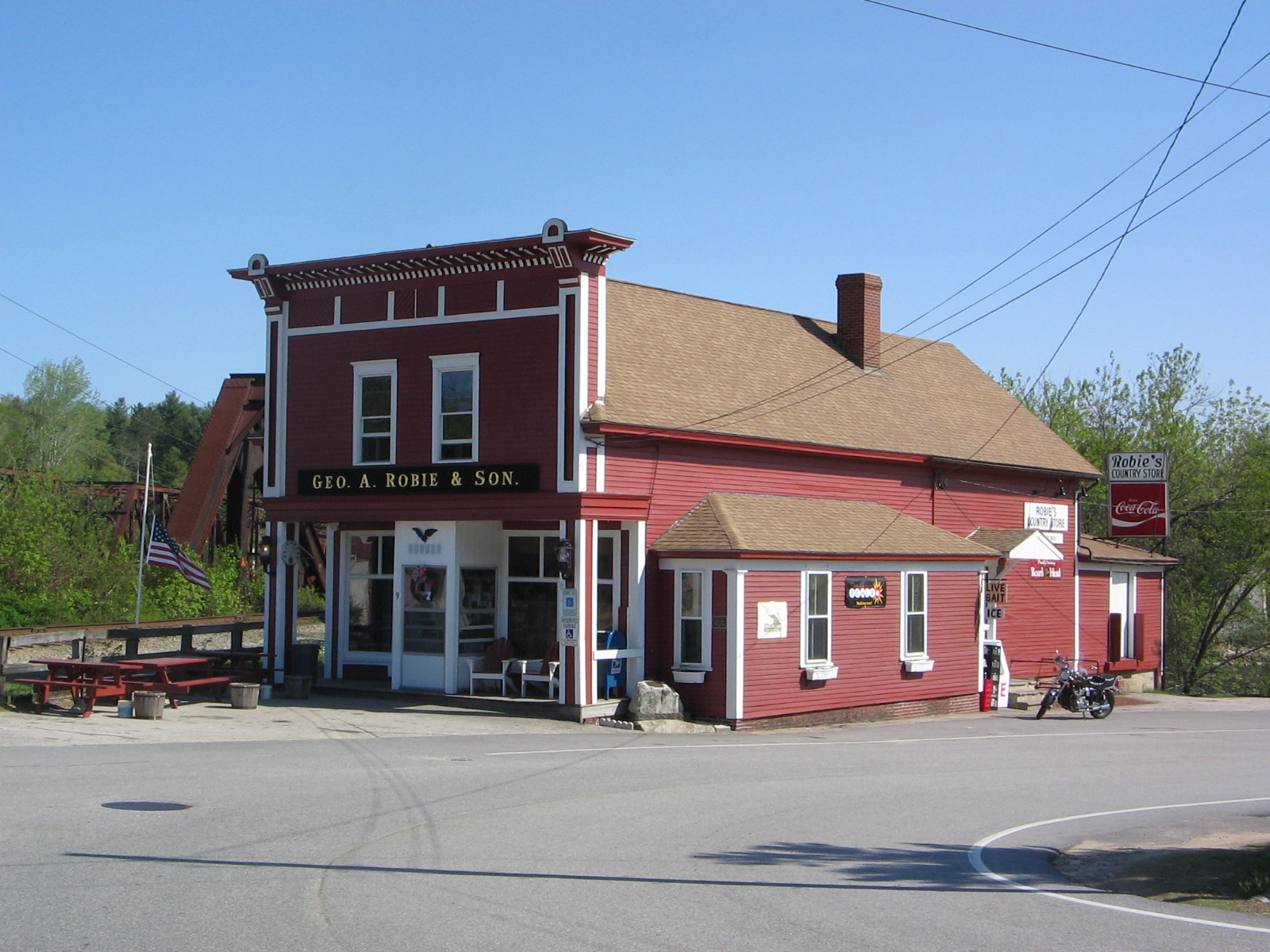
Robie's Country Store in Hooksett Village

As of the census of 2010, there were 13,451 people, 4,926 households, and 3,533 families residing in the town. The population density was 369 inhabitants per square mile (142/km^{2}). There were 5,184 housing units at an average density of 54.9 units/km^{2} (142.4 units/sq mi). The racial makeup of the town was 94.6% White, 1.0% African American, 0.2% Native American, 2.0% Asian, 0.1% Pacific Islander, 0.7% some other race, and 1.5% from two or more races. 2.1% of the population were Hispanic or Latino of any race.

There were 4,926 households, out of which 34.2% had children under the age of 18 living with them, 59.0% were headed by married couples living together, 8.8% had a female householder with no husband present, and 28.3% were non-families. 20.4% of all households were made up of individuals, and 7.6% were someone living alone who was 65 years of age or older. The average household size was 2.59, and the average family size was 3.01.

In the town, the population was spread out, with 22.4% under the age of 18, 10.9% from 18 to 24, 25.1% from 25 to 44, 30.0% from 45 to 64, and 11.6% who were 65 years of age or older. The median age was 39.8 years. For every 100 females, there were 93.7 males. For every 100 females age 18 and over, there were 91.8 males.

For the period 2009 through 2013, the estimated median annual income for a household in the town was $81,792, and the median income for a family was $96,469. Male full-time workers had a median income of $57,228 versus $45,116 for females. The per capita income for the town was $34,355.

For demographic data on Hooksett village and its surroundings, see Hooksett (CDP), New Hampshire. For data on the South Hooksett CDP in the southern part of the town, see South Hooksett, New Hampshire.

== Transportation ==
Five New Hampshire state routes, two Interstate Highways, and one U.S. route cross Hooksett.

- NH 3A crosses Hooksett from south to north closely paralleling the Merrimack River and I-93 and is known locally as West River Road. It connects Manchester to Bow.
- NH 27 begins in Hooksett at NH 28/US 3 and follows Whitehall Road eastwards into Candia.
- NH 28 crosses Hooksett from south to north in concurrency with US 3 and is known locally as Hooksett Road, Daniel Webster Highway, and Allenstown Road. It connects Manchester to Suncook.
- NH 28A enters from the south at Manchester, and follows Mammoth Road to its northern terminus at NH 28/US3.
- NH 28 Bypass enters from the southeast and Auburn after crossing a small portion of Manchester. It follows Londonderry Turnpike and terminates at NH 28/US 3.
- Interstate 93 is a freeway that crosses the town from south to north, connecting Manchester to Bow. There are three interchanges that provide access to Hooksett: one with NH 28/US 3 in South Hooksett, one with NH 3A just after crossing the Merrimack River, and one with Hackett Hill Road in the northern part of Hooksett, which also provides access to NH 3A. There is an additional freeway junction with I-293. The portion of I-93 north of I-293 is part of the F.E. Everett Turnpike. There is a rest area and welcome center in Hooksett, close to the border with neighboring Bow.
- Interstate 293 enters the town briefly near the southern border with Manchester and terminates at I-93. The freeway has no exits that provide direct access to Hooksett.
- US 3 crosses Hooksett from south to north in concurrency with NH 28 and is known locally as Hooksett Road, Daniel Webster Highway, and Allenstown Road. It connects Manchester to Suncook.

== Education ==
Hooksett is part of School Administrative Unit 15, along with the neighboring towns of Auburn and Candia. SAU-15 administers five schools, three within Hooksett:

- Fred C. Underhill School (lower elementary, grades Pre-K–2)
- Hooksett Memorial School (upper elementary, grades 3–5)
- David R. Cawley Middle School (grades 6–8)

SAU-15 has no high school; students from Hooksett attend high school in neighboring school districts. As of 2014, Hooksett has contracted with Pinkerton Academy for the majority of its high school students (about 650), while a smaller number of students would attend either Bow High School (about 40 students), Pembroke Academy (about ten students) or Londonderry High School (about 160 students). Prior to 2014, Hooksett students attended high school at one of the three high schools of the Manchester School District in the city of Manchester. In October 2013 618 high school students lived in Hooksett, with 426 of them attending Manchester school district schools. Students may still chose to attend Manchester schools after 2014.

One four-year university, Southern New Hampshire University, lies partially within Hooksett and partially in neighboring Manchester.

== See also ==
- 2021 Little League World Series, when a team from North Manchester–Hooksett won the New England Region
