= Murray Hill Summer Home District =

Historic district in New Hampshire, United States

- U.S. National Register of Historic Places
- U.S. Historic district
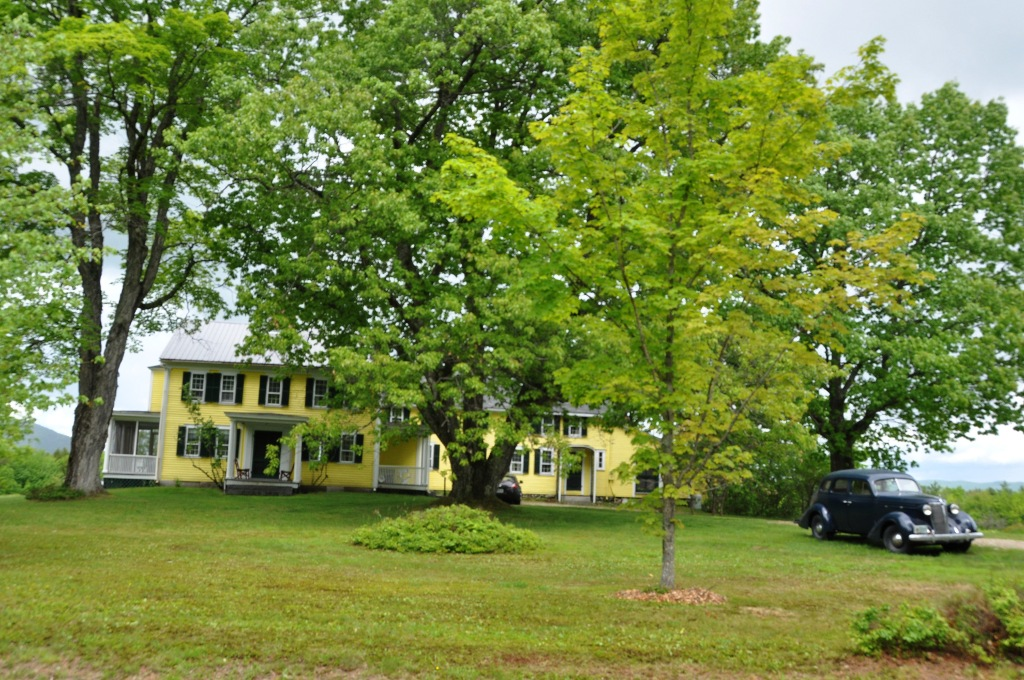

- Location within New Hampshire Location within the United States
- Location: Murray Hill Rd. roughly between Cass Mill and Lynch Rds., Hill, New Hampshire
- Coordinates: 43°32′24″N 71°47′46″W
- Area: 108 acres (44 ha)
- Architectural style: Colonial Revival, Shingle Style
- NRHP reference No.: 88000179
- Added to NRHP: March 17, 1988

The Murray Hill Summer Home District is a collection of farmhouses and related buildings on Murray Hill Road, a rural road in Hill, New Hampshire. The area is distinctive as a cohesive collection of rural properties that were adapted for use as summer estates between 1873 and 1937, the start date representing an early transition from agricultural to tourist use of such properties in the state. The district has eight farmhouses that were adapted, and two Shingle style houses, as well as one 19th-century district schoolhouse that has been repurposed as a meeting space. All are located on Murray Hill Road between Cass Mill Road and Lynch (Dickerson Hill) Road. The district was listed on the National Register of Historic Places in 1988.

Murray Hill Road, located in northwestern Hill, very roughly follows a terrace at an elevation of about 1,000 feet (300 m) on the north side of a ridge whose peaks are Page and Dickinson Hills (elevations 1,600 feet (490 m) and 1,800 feet (550 m) respectively). Remnants of the area's agricultural past survive in the form of abandoned roads and farm tracks, and stone walls which line fields and wooded areas. In 1873 John Murdock began buying up land in the area, which he subdivided for the development of summer houses. Land was typically transferred between family members and friends. By the time the state was involved in organized attempts to adapt abandoned farms for the summer tourist trade, the Murray Hill area had for the most part already been transformed. One typical property is the Chandler property, which includes a farmhouse built c. 1810, and operated primarily as a farm until 1878. The owners then began taking in summer boarders to supplement declining farm income. The Chandlers acquired the property in 1927, and began a series of modifications to adapt it as a summer property.

== See also ==
- National Register of Historic Places listings in Merrimack County, New Hampshire
