= South Hooksett, New Hampshire =

Census-designated place in New Hampshire, United States

- Census-designated place
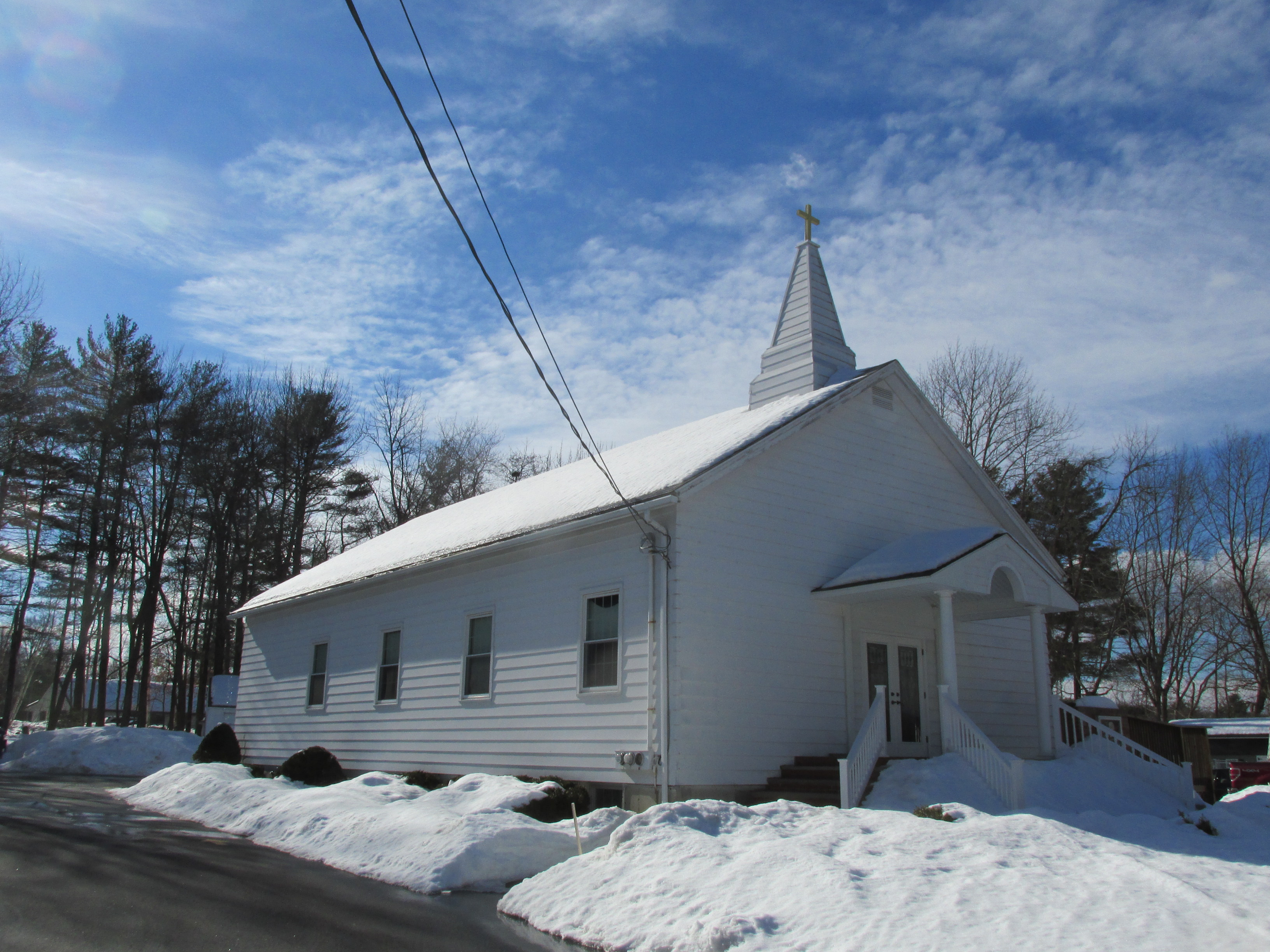
- Grace Chapel Church of the Nazarene

- Location in Merrimack County and the state of New Hampshire
- Coordinates: 43°01′59″N 71°25′31″W
- Country: United States
- State: New Hampshire
- County: Merrimack
- Town: Hooksett

Area
  - Total: 6.75 sq mi (17.48 km^{2})
  - Land: 6.74 sq mi (17.46 km^{2})
  - Water: 0.0077 sq mi (0.02 km^{2})
- Elevation: 535 ft (163 m)

Population (2020)
  - Total: 5,888
  - Density: 873.5/sq mi (337.27/km^{2})
- Time zone: UTC-5 (Eastern (EST))
  - Summer (DST): UTC-4 (EDT)
- Area code: 603
- FIPS code: 33-71220
- GNIS feature ID: 2378091

South Hooksett is a census-designated place (CDP) within the town of Hooksett, New Hampshire, United States. The population was 5,888 at the 2020 census. It is a suburban area adjacent to the city of Manchester, New Hampshire's largest city, and includes a mix of housing developments and large retail stores.

== Geography ==
South Hooksett is located in the southern part of the town of Hooksett (and the southernmost part of Merrimack County). It is bordered to the west and south by the city of Manchester in Hillsborough County, to the east by the town of Auburn in Rockingham County, and to the north by Legends Road, Hooksett Road (U.S. Route 3), Londonderry Turnpike (New Hampshire Route 28 Bypass), a line north of Whitehall Road (New Hampshire Route 27), and Farmer Road. The Hooksett portion of the campus of Southern New Hampshire University is within the CDP.

According to the United States Census Bureau, the CDP has a total area of 6.8 square miles (17.5 km^{2}), of which 0.01 square miles (0.02 km^{2}), or 0.12%, are water. The Merrimack River runs just outside the northwestern boundary of the CDP, and the northern half of the CDP is drained by Dalton Brook and Messer Brook, westward-flowing tributaries of the Merrimack. The southwestern corner of the CDP drains south to Dorrs Pond in Manchester, while the southeastern part is drained by Neal Brook, a southward-flowing tributary of Massabesic Lake. The entire CDP is part of the Merrimack River watershed.

== Demographics ==
Historical population
Census	Pop.	Note	%±
1960	1,407		—
1970	1,662		18.1%
1980	1,584		−4.7%
1990	1,717		8.4%
2000	3,638		111.9%
2010	5,418		48.9%
2020	5,888		8.7%
U.S. Decennial Census

=== 2020 census ===
As of the 2020 census, South Hooksett had a population of 5,888. The median age was 37.9 years. 18.8% of residents were under the age of 18 and 14.7% of residents were 65 years of age or older. For every 100 females there were 96.3 males, and for every 100 females age 18 and over there were 97.8 males age 18 and over.

98.6% of residents lived in urban areas, while 1.4% lived in rural areas.

There were 1,985 households in South Hooksett, of which 32.0% had children under the age of 18 living in them. Of all households, 57.4% were married-couple households, 14.8% were households with a male householder and no spouse or partner present, and 20.1% were households with a female householder and no spouse or partner present. About 21.4% of all households were made up of individuals and 9.3% had someone living alone who was 65 years of age or older.

There were 2,043 housing units, of which 2.8% were vacant. The homeowner vacancy rate was 0.4% and the rental vacancy rate was 3.3%.

Racial composition as of the 2020 census
Race	Number	Percent
White	5,183	88.0%
Black or African American	115	2.0%
American Indian and Alaska Native	16	0.3%
Asian	135	2.3%
Native Hawaiian and Other Pacific Islander	8	0.1%
Some other race	66	1.1%
Two or more races	365	6.2%
Hispanic or Latino (of any race)	212	3.6%

=== 2010 census ===
As of the census of 2010, there were 5,418 people, 1,765 households, and 1,297 families residing in the CDP. The population density was 1,020.3 inhabitants per square mile (393.9/km^{2}). There were 1,845 housing units at an average density of 347.5 per square mile (134.2/km^{2}). The racial makeup of the CDP was 94.4% White, 1.2% African American, 0.3% Native American, 2.0% Asian, 0.1% Pacific Islander, 0.7% some other race, and 1.5% from two or more races. Hispanic or Latino of any race were 2.0% of the population.

There were 1,765 households, out of which 36.7% had children under the age of 18 living with them, 60.6% were headed by married couples living together, 8.7% had a female householder with no husband present, and 26.5% were non-families. 18.0% of all households were made up of individuals, and 6.8% were someone living alone who was 65 years of age or older. The average household size was 2.69, and the average family size was 3.07.

In the CDP, the population was spread out, with 21.7% under the age of 18, 17.6% from 18 to 24, 23.1% from 25 to 44, 27.3% from 45 to 64, and 10.4% who were 65 years of age or older. The median age was 36.2 years. For every 100 females, there were 93.2 males. For every 100 females age 18 and over, there were 91.5 males.

=== Income and poverty ===
For the period 2009 through 2013, the estimated median annual income for a household in the CDP was $87,377, and the median income for a family was $105,769. Male full-time workers had a median income of $63,886 versus $44,522 for females. The per capita income for the CDP was $33,319.

== Education ==
South Hooksett CDP is within Hooksett School District, which is a part of School Administrative Unit 15.

A portion of Southern New Hampshire University is within South Hooksett CDP.
