= New Hampshire communities by household income =

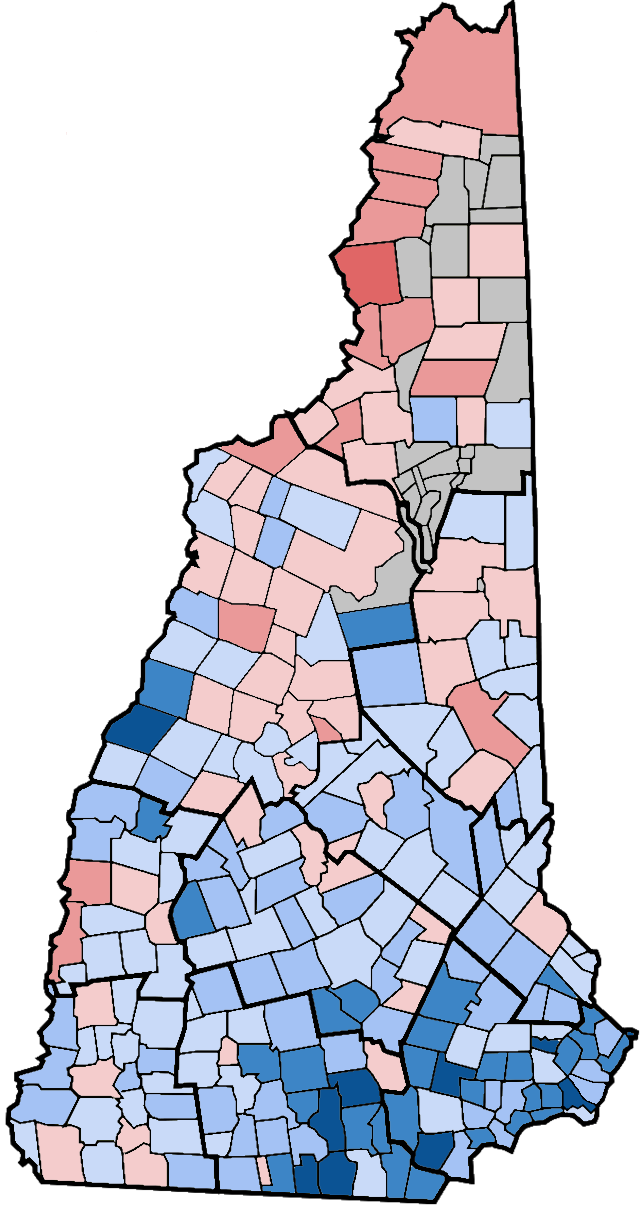
Map of municipalities by median household income (ACS 2015-2019). Areas with higher income are shaded more blue, areas with lower income are shaded more red.

New Hampshire is the state with the seventh highest median household income in the United States: $89,992 as of 2022. The most affluent parts of the state are in the Seacoast Region, in the outer Boston suburbs, and around Dartmouth College. Ranked below are the 234 incorporated cities and towns, as well as two inhabited townships, in New Hampshire by median household income, using the 2018-2022 American Community Survey 5-year data (2022 dollars).

Rank	Community	Median household income
1	Newfields, New Hampshire	$184,688
2	Windham, New Hampshire	$171,563
3	Madbury, New Hampshire	$165,583
4	New Castle, New Hampshire	$164,167
5	Brookline, New Hampshire	$163,628
6	Mont Vernon, New Hampshire	$156,667
7	Newington, New Hampshire	$155,809
8	Hollis, New Hampshire	$155,339
9	Brentwood, New Hampshire	$154,464
10	Hanover, New Hampshire	$154,023
11	Hampton Falls, New Hampshire	$152,045
12	Bedford, New Hampshire	$151,850
13	Amherst, New Hampshire	$151,375
14	South Hampton, New Hampshire	$151,250
15	Bow, New Hampshire	$147,951
16	Greenland, New Hampshire	$143,625
17	Newton, New Hampshire	$141,328
18	Kensington, New Hampshire	$139,583
19	Auburn, New Hampshire	$138,750
20	Dunbarton, New Hampshire	$138,036
21	New Boston, New Hampshire	$137,991
22	Rye, New Hampshire	$137,969
23	Atkinson, New Hampshire	$137,674
24	Lyme, New Hampshire	$135,982
25	Chester, New Hampshire	$135,326
26	Litchfield, New Hampshire	$134,000
27	Strafford, New Hampshire	$133,889
28	Sutton, New Hampshire	$130,568
29	Londonderry, New Hampshire	$127,946
30	Stratham, New Hampshire	$126,830
31	Sandown, New Hampshire	$125,888
32	Hudson, New Hampshire	$125,216
33	Sandwich, New Hampshire	$124,833
34	Sugar Hill, New Hampshire	$124,500
35	Northwood, New Hampshire	$122,294
36	Pelham, New Hampshire	$121,875
37	Fremont, New Hampshire	$121,583
38	Merrimack, New Hampshire	$121,489
39	Deerfield, New Hampshire	$119,375
40	Chichester, New Hampshire	$119,306
41	Danville, New Hampshire	$118,267
42	Candia, New Hampshire	$117,108
43	Lee, New Hampshire	$116,350
44	Newbury, New Hampshire	$116,250
45	North Hampton, New Hampshire	$116,034
46	Hopkinton, New Hampshire	$115,682
47	East Kingston, New Hampshire	$115,288
48	Plainfield, New Hampshire	$115,257
49	Grantham, New Hampshire	$114,132
50	Lyndeborough, New Hampshire	$113,036
51	Gilford, New Hampshire	$112,522
52	Alton, New Hampshire	$111,875
53	Canterbury, New Hampshire	$111,094
54	Wilmot, New Hampshire	$110,917
55	Weare, New Hampshire	$109,779
56	Chesterfield, New Hampshire	$109,500
57	Campton, New Hampshire	$107,500
58	Hampstead, New Hampshire	$106,538
59	Hebron, New Hampshire	$106,250
60	Webster, New Hampshire	$105,417
61	Francestown, New Hampshire	$105,347
62	Gilmanton, New Hampshire	$104,875
63	Orange, New Hampshire	$104,375
64	Goffstown, New Hampshire	$104,113
65	Plaistow, New Hampshire	$103,788
66	Mason, New Hampshire	$103,438
67	Marlow, New Hampshire	$103,333
68	Barrington, New Hampshire	$103,258
69	Sharon, New Hampshire	$102,708
70	Sunapee, New Hampshire	$102,361
71	Salem, New Hampshire	$101,856
72	Madison, New Hampshire	$101,333
73	Hooksett, New Hampshire	$100,321
74	Center Harbor, New Hampshire	$100,192
75	Portsmouth, New Hampshire	$100,169
76	Greenfield, New Hampshire	$99,583
77	Langdon, New Hampshire	$99,500
78	Easton, New Hampshire	$98,500
79	Durham, New Hampshire	$98,190
80	Newmarket, New Hampshire	$98,002
81	Peterborough, New Hampshire	$98,000
82	Salisbury, New Hampshire	$97,917
83	Rindge, New Hampshire	$97,754
84	Sullivan, New Hampshire	$97,250
85	New Durham, New Hampshire	$97,000
86	Croydon, New Hampshire	$96,875
87	Epping, New Hampshire	$96,558
88	Dublin, New Hampshire	$96,463
89	Nottingham, New Hampshire	$96,047
90	Windsor, New Hampshire	$96,042
91	Springfield, New Hampshire	$95,833
92	Randolph, New Hampshire	$95,556
93	Pembroke, New Hampshire	$95,396
94	Deering, New Hampshire	$95,119
95	Moultonborough, New Hampshire	$95,020
96	Derry, New Hampshire	$94,799
97	Westmoreland, New Hampshire	$94,609
98	Middleton, New Hampshire	$94,300
99	Jackson, New Hampshire	$94,219
100	Surry, New Hampshire	$93,750
101	Temple, New Hampshire	$93,104
102	Hampton, New Hampshire	$92,605
103	Enfield, New Hampshire	$92,473
104	New Ipswich, New Hampshire	$91,824
105	Nelson, New Hampshire	$91,786
106	Raymond, New Hampshire	$91,520
107	Lebanon, New Hampshire	$90,911
108	Dover, New Hampshire	$90,844
109	Epsom, New Hampshire	$90,805
110	Kingston, New Hampshire	$90,074
111	Harrisville, New Hampshire	$89,737
112	Shelburne, New Hampshire	$89,375
113	Barnstead, New Hampshire	$89,303
114	Brookfield, New Hampshire	$89,286
115	Waterville Valley, New Hampshire	$89,276
116	Wilton, New Hampshire	$89,274
117	Lempster, New Hampshire	$89,000
118	Nashua, New Hampshire	$88,766
119	Stoddard, New Hampshire	$88,750
120	Hancock, New Hampshire	$88,611
121	Piermont, New Hampshire	$88,438
122	Richmond, New Hampshire	$88,125
123	Exeter, New Hampshire	$87,969
124	New London, New Hampshire	$87,237
125	Wentworth, New Hampshire	$87,143
126	Cornish, New Hampshire	$86,779
127	Andover, New Hampshire	$86,591
128	Wakefield, New Hampshire	$86,573
129	Milton, New Hampshire	$86,534
130	Lyman, New Hampshire	$86,071
131	Antrim, New Hampshire	$85,990
132	Seabrook, New Hampshire	$85,935
133	Fitzwilliam, New Hampshire	$85,733
134	Milford, New Hampshire	$84,912
135	Washington, New Hampshire	$84,886
136	Hale's Location, New Hampshire	$84,313
137	Boscawen, New Hampshire	$84,292
138	Hill, New Hampshire	$84,167
139	Bradford, New Hampshire	$83,833
140	Walpole, New Hampshire	$83,750
141	Effingham, New Hampshire	$83,021
142	Tuftonboro, New Hampshire	$82,837
143	Orford, New Hampshire	$82,625
144	Thornton, New Hampshire	$82,593
145	Warner, New Hampshire	$82,500
146	Jaffrey, New Hampshire	$82,167
147	Bethlehem, New Hampshire	$82,063
148	Hillsborough, New Hampshire	$82,059
149	Greenville, New Hampshire	$81,806
150	Sanbornton, New Hampshire	$81,645
151	Alexandria, New Hampshire	$81,563
152	Rollinsford, New Hampshire	$81,184
153	Canaan, New Hampshire	$79,540
154	Holderness, New Hampshire	$79,125
155	Monroe, New Hampshire	$78,958
156	Concord, New Hampshire	$77,874
157	Carroll, New Hampshire	$77,500
158	Bridgewater, New Hampshire	$77,500
159	Loudon, New Hampshire	$77,065
160	Landaff, New Hampshire	$76,786
161	Acworth, New Hampshire	$76,719
162	Henniker, New Hampshire	$76,681
163	Chatham, New Hampshire	$76,250
164	Somersworth, New Hampshire	$75,841
165	Wolfeboro, New Hampshire	$75,783
166	Lancaster, New Hampshire	$75,493
167	Bristol, New Hampshire	$75,149
168	Northfield, New Hampshire	$75,108
169	Dummer, New Hampshire	$75,000
170	Rochester, New Hampshire	$74,882
171	Allenstown, New Hampshire	$74,659
172	Ellsworth, New Hampshire	$74,375
173	Newport, New Hampshire	$74,263
174	Freedom, New Hampshire	$74,167
175	Manchester, New Hampshire	$74,040
176	New Hampton, New Hampshire	$73,971
177	Belmont, New Hampshire	$73,302
178	Bennington, New Hampshire	$73,102
179	Grafton, New Hampshire	$72,500
180	Clarksville, New Hampshire	$72,404
181	Swanzey, New Hampshire	$71,875
182	Plymouth, New Hampshire	$71,144
183	Marlborough, New Hampshire	$70,800
184	Milan, New Hampshire	$70,750
185	Gilsum, New Hampshire	$70,000
186	Ossipee, New Hampshire	$69,659
187	Keene, New Hampshire	$69,381
188	Franconia, New Hampshire	$68,750
189	Groton, New Hampshire	$68,611
190	Laconia, New Hampshire	$67,856
191	Eaton, New Hampshire	$67,813
192	Roxbury, New Hampshire	$67,440
193	Hinsdale, New Hampshire	$67,054
194	Franklin, New Hampshire	$66,942
195	Albany, New Hampshire	$66,607
196	Unity, New Hampshire	$65,833
197	Errol, New Hampshire	$65,625
198	Meredith, New Hampshire	$65,372
199	Bath, New Hampshire	$64,904
200	Woodstock, New Hampshire	$64,904
201	Dalton, New Hampshire	$64,632
202	Tilton, New Hampshire	$64,577
203	Pittsfield, New Hampshire	$64,564
204	Benton, New Hampshire	$64,167
205	Lincoln, New Hampshire	$63,813
206	Jefferson, New Hampshire	$63,765
207	Lisbon, New Hampshire	$63,375
208	Danbury, New Hampshire	$62,500
209	Tamworth, New Hampshire	$61,094
210	Farmington, New Hampshire	$60,978
211	Goshen, New Hampshire	$59,896
212	Conway, New Hampshire	$59,271
213	Haverhill, New Hampshire	$58,946
214	Rumney, New Hampshire	$58,750
215	Whitefield, New Hampshire	$57,993
216	Troy, New Hampshire	$57,500
217	Winchester, New Hampshire	$56,645
218	Bartlett, New Hampshire	$55,833
219	Gorham, New Hampshire	$55,816
220	Stark, New Hampshire	$55,500
221	Claremont, New Hampshire	$53,697
222	Ashland, New Hampshire	$53,367
223	Alstead, New Hampshire	$52,957
224	Northumberland, New Hampshire	$52,171
225	Stewartstown, New Hampshire	$51,823
226	Columbia, New Hampshire	$51,406
227	Warren, New Hampshire	$51,087
228	Pittsburg, New Hampshire	$50,893
229	Littleton, New Hampshire	$50,881
230	Colebrook, New Hampshire	$49,756
231	Stratford, New Hampshire	$47,861
232	Charlestown, New Hampshire	$46,642
233	Dorchester, New Hampshire	$46,250
234	Berlin, New Hampshire	$41,638
235	Wentworth Location, New Hampshire	$33,750
236	Hart's Location, New Hampshire	no data -

== See also ==
- List of cities and towns in New Hampshire
- New Hampshire locations by per capita income
