= List of New Hampshire locations by per capita income =

In 2020 New Hampshire ranked sixth in terms of per capita income in the United States of America, at $41,234 as of the 2016-2020 American Community Survey 5-year estimate.

== New Hampshire counties ranked by per capita income ==
Note: Data are from the 2020 United States census and the 2016-2020 American Community Survey 5-year estimates.

Rank	County	Per capita income	Median household income	Median family income	Population	Number of households
1	Rockingham	$48,675	$93,962	$113,827	314,176	125,787
2	Carroll	$42,085	$66,932	$79,380	50,107	22,667
3	Hillsborough	$42,081	$82,099	$103,238	422,937	167,875
	New Hampshire	$41,234	$77,923	$97,001	1,377,529	556,357
4	Grafton	$39,669	$67,476	$85,856	91,118	37,683
5	Merrimack	$38,213	$77,937	$95,270	153,808	60,420
6	Belknap	$37,766	$67,328	$86,571	63,705	27,027
7	Strafford	$36,659	$72,682	$92,642	130,889	51,454
	United States	$35,384	$64,994	$80,069	331,449,281	126,817,580
8	Cheshire	$34,242	$64,686	$83,400	76,458	31,372
9	Sullivan	$33,207	$63,760	$80,710	43,063	18,164
10	Coos	$28,442	$48,945	$65,142	31,268	13,908

== New Hampshire places ranked by per capita income ==
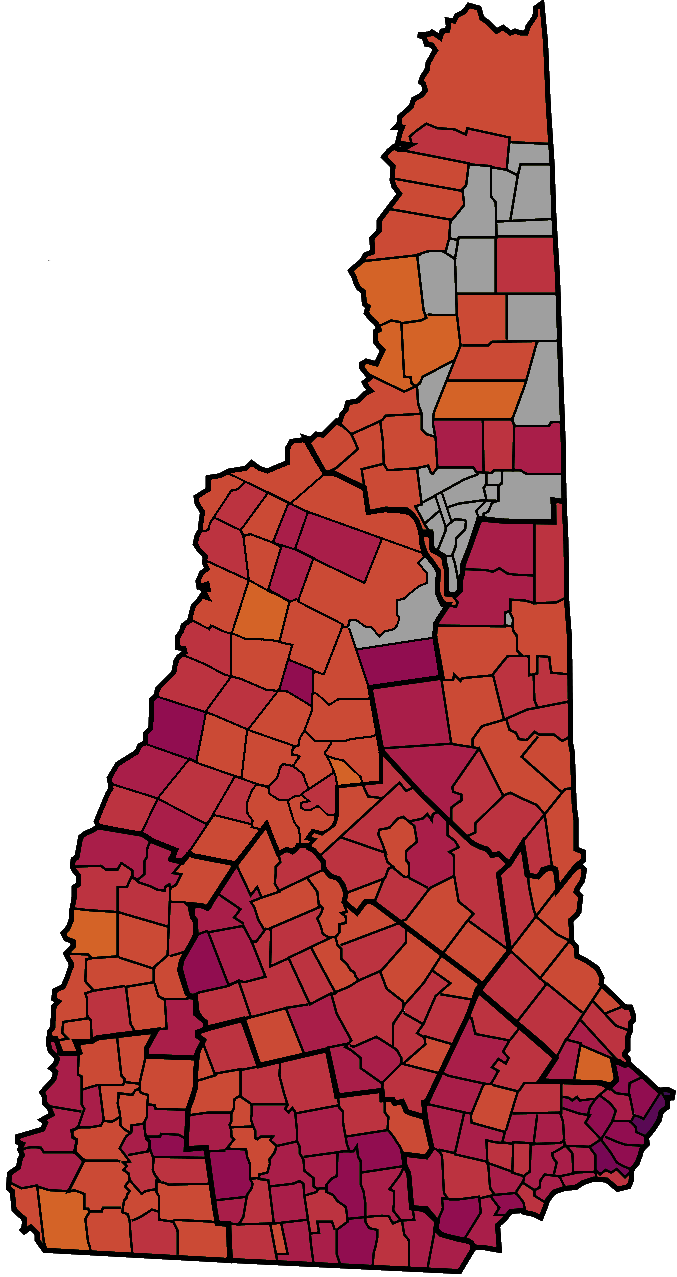
Map of municipalities by per capita income (ACS 2015-2019). Areas with higher income are shaded more purple, areas with lower income are shaded more orange.

Data are from the 2016-2020 American Community Survey 5-year estimates.

#	Place	Per capita income	Margin of error
68	Alton	$45,818	$7,503
170	Barnstead	$33,836	$3,844
161	Belmont	$34,479	$4,738
69	Center Harbor	$45,759	$6,732
35	Gilford	$51,704	$6,548
156	Gilmanton	$35,183	$4,743
179	Laconia	$33,119	$2,376
96	Meredith	$42,116	$5,209
207	New Hampton	$30,413	$4,024
148	Sanbornton	$36,154	$4,778
209	Tilton	$30,353	$3,655
186	Albany	$32,429	$3,634
33	Bartlett	$51,968	$17,938
114	Brookfield	$39,295	$7,258
77	Chatham	$44,467	$12,233
136	Conway	$36,989	$5,953
19	Eaton	$57,056	$18,833
193	Effingham	$31,966	$4,568
168	Freedom	$33,906	$4,534
1	Hale's Location	$122,368	$57,320
122	Hart's Location	$38,738	$10,302
54	Jackson	$47,873	$14,371
115	Madison	$39,282	$8,706
34	Moultonborough	$51,824	$7,218
159	Ossipee	$35,142	$13,545
4	Sandwich	$86,941	$35,614
182	Tamworth	$32,714	$7,434
108	Tuftonboro	$40,334	$5,742
138	Wakefield	$36,715	$4,457
75	Wolfeboro	$44,764	$6,953
213	Alstead	$29,680	$3,172
92	Chesterfield	$42,730	$8,650
76	Dublin	$44,707	$7,714
125	Fitzwilliam	$38,588	$5,071
204	Gilsum	$31,233	$3,098
28	Harrisville	$52,872	$7,874
201	Hinsdale	$31,341	$3,104
143	Jaffrey	$36,468	$5,904
191	Keene	$32,179	$2,303
95	Marlborough	$42,444	$10,586
153	Marlow	$35,550	$5,105
36	Nelson	$51,328	$9,980
158	Richmond	$35,165	$5,325
216	Rindge	$29,134	$2,711
82	Roxbury	$43,626	$22,299
147	Stoddard	$36,241	$4,382
141	Sullivan	$36,527	$5,442
118	Surry	$38,967	$10,830
203	Swanzey	$31,279	$2,695
202	Troy	$31,284	$3,973
105	Walpole	$40,642	$4,437
106	Westmoreland	$40,624	$4,620
230	Winchester	$24,579	$3,453
236	Berlin	$21,246	$1,473
127	Carroll	$37,815	$6,951
134	Clarksville	$37,043	$11,722
163	Colebrook	$34,355	$4,306
192	Columbia	$32,156	$9,581
217	Dalton	$28,705	$4,653
238	Dixville	$14,800	$18,958
214	Dummer	$29,488	$4,479
194	Errol	$31,885	$5,216
119	Gorham	$38,950	$5,053
234	Greens Grant	$21,533	$24,705
139	Jefferson	$36,646	$4,441
200	Lancaster	$31,368	$4,389
198	Milan	$31,581	$3,363
226	Northumberland	$25,784	$2,633
189	Pittsburg	$32,256	$2,984
53	Randolph	$47,989	$6,615
103	Shelburne	$40,819	$5,654
233	Stark	$22,862	$4,346
223	Stewartstown	$26,988	$3,971
237	Stratford	$20,019	$3,779
235	Wentworth Location	$21,335	$5,691
220	Whitefield	$27,632	$2,605
206	Alexandria	$30,591	$3,867
229	Ashland	$24,901	$5,510
175	Bath	$33,425	$6,076
231	Benton	$24,566	$3,914
196	Bethlehem	$31,710	$3,119
101	Bridgewater	$40,930	$5,772
211	Bristol	$29,904	$3,547
164	Campton	$34,153	$4,839
128	Canaan	$37,805	$6,223
210	Dorchester	$30,013	$7,674
50	Easton	$48,226	$9,455
91	Ellsworth	$42,843	$52,972
26	Enfield	$53,521	$14,182
57	Franconia	$47,494	$8,128
166	Grafton	$34,048	$5,041
176	Groton	$33,423	$3,467
62	Hanover	$46,870	$6,291
195	Haverhill	$31,760	$3,819
55	Hebron	$47,567	$10,583
145	Holderness	$36,345	$5,804
205	Landaff	$31,206	$5,445
93	Lebanon	$42,675	$4,170
218	Lincoln	$28,395	$4,895
221	Lisbon	$27,529	$4,657
78	Littleton	$44,412	$12,914
142	Lyman	$36,498	$7,533
6	Lyme	$71,383	$9,516
187	Monroe	$32,421	$4,914
46	Orange	$48,929	$13,941
32	Orford	$52,446	$14,962
41	Piermont	$50,321	$12,089
224	Plymouth	$26,160	$4,653
197	Rumney	$31,639	$4,001
3	Sugar Hill	$117,399	$98,110
154	Thornton	$35,457	$4,366
184	Warren	$32,454	$6,342
20	Waterville Valley	$56,128	$11,936
155	Wentworth	$35,455	$7,314
129	Woodstock	$37,621	$6,333
9	Amherst	$64,135	$6,585
178	Antrim	$33,410	$4,201
17	Bedford	$57,961	$4,482
172	Bennington	$33,693	$5,267
30	Brookline	$52,698	$5,376
117	Deering	$38,970	$5,338
42	Francestown	$50,180	$6,544
126	Goffstown	$37,989	$2,850
80	Greenfield	$43,817	$8,651
160	Greenville	$34,920	$6,787
71	Hancock	$45,467	$4,228
133	Hillsborough	$37,130	$8,255
8	Hollis	$65,818	$8,820
59	Hudson	$47,122	$3,497
72	Litchfield	$45,272	$4,327
70	Lyndeborough	$45,741	$5,262
165	Manchester	$34,096	$1,358
99	Mason	$41,495	$4,036
60	Merrimack	$47,040	$3,237
131	Milford	$37,253	$2,646
29	Mont Vernon	$52,833	$6,422
109	Nashua	$40,111	$1,438
39	New Boston	$50,586	$5,675
152	New Ipswich	$35,727	$5,851
79	Pelham	$43,892	$2,757
21	Peterborough	$55,819	$8,555
66	Sharon	$46,043	$9,063
98	Temple	$41,510	$6,983
112	Weare	$39,599	$3,150
86	Wilton	$43,213	$6,950
190	Windsor	$32,231	$10,947
222	Allenstown	$27,118	$2,846
167	Andover	$34,023	$5,803
188	Boscawen	$32,326	$3,141
43	Bow	$49,813	$4,252
97	Bradford	$42,006	$5,119
85	Canterbury	$43,317	$4,097
123	Chichester	$38,709	$2,989
132	Concord	$37,223	$1,720
180	Danbury	$32,991	$6,224
45	Dunbarton	$49,470	$7,402
110	Epsom	$40,022	$4,862
199	Franklin	$31,569	$2,863
173	Henniker	$33,686	$4,499
116	Hill	$38,995	$4,685
111	Hooksett	$39,677	$3,786
51	Hopkinton	$48,186	$7,560
177	Loudon	$33,414	$4,466
31	Newbury	$52,534	$6,996
88	New London	$43,095	$6,671
181	Northfield	$32,981	$4,942
140	Pembroke	$36,603	$3,835
215	Pittsfield	$29,138	$3,788
151	Salisbury	$35,805	$3,662
37	Sutton	$51,225	$12,864
149	Warner	$36,149	$3,511
144	Webster	$36,426	$5,914
25	Wilmot	$53,863	$6,961
23	Atkinson	$54,905	$4,933
56	Auburn	$47,519	$5,760
24	Brentwood	$54,898	$5,636
65	Candia	$46,316	$4,126
47	Chester	$48,914	$4,006
104	Danville	$40,800	$5,652
61	Deerfield	$46,937	$5,283
130	Derry	$37,471	$2,108
83	East Kingston	$43,603	$10,790
135	Epping	$37,017	$3,121
18	Exeter	$57,384	$7,528
102	Fremont	$40,897	$2,994
16	Greenland	$58,583	$7,164
58	Hampstead	$47,175	$4,223
27	Hampton	$53,154	$4,839
7	Hampton Falls	$66,371	$8,310
52	Kensington	$48,085	$3,591
67	Kingston	$45,916	$10,704
63	Londonderry	$46,674	$2,375
2	New Castle	$120,230	$46,066
13	Newfields	$62,058	$7,037
10	Newington	$62,933	$9,518
90	Newmarket	$42,844	$2,646
48	Newton	$48,792	$4,285
14	North Hampton	$61,967	$8,046
113	Northwood	$39,479	$3,931
74	Nottingham	$44,858	$9,664
84	Plaistow	$43,473	$4,505
22	Portsmouth	$54,967	$3,654
169	Raymond	$33,888	$3,688
5	Rye	$78,448	$16,474
64	Salem	$46,380	$2,833
107	Sandown	$40,437	$4,969
94	Seabrook	$42,621	$4,914
44	South Hampton	$49,723	$6,594
11	Stratham	$62,776	$8,888
12	Windham	$62,702	$5,390
87	Barrington	$43,148	$4,299
89	Dover	$43,061	$2,606
228	Durham	$25,045	$2,713
208	Farmington	$30,395	$4,363
38	Lee	$51,084	$4,533
49	Madbury	$48,721	$5,555
150	Middleton	$35,811	$3,632
171	Milton	$33,720	$3,734
157	New Durham	$35,167	$3,674
162	Rochester	$34,457	$2,136
146	Rollinsford	$36,334	$3,642
185	Somersworth	$32,448	$1,936
100	Strafford	$41,017	$4,922
219	Acworth	$28,090	$7,540
227	Charlestown	$25,775	$3,992
225	Claremont	$26,158	$1,846
81	Cornish	$43,783	$6,107
137	Croydon	$36,859	$13,382
232	Goshen	$24,091	$4,977
40	Grantham	$50,414	$5,896
15	Langdon	$59,197	$30,475
174	Lempster	$33,655	$4,240
183	Newport	$32,596	$4,164
73	Plainfield	$44,882	$7,298
120	Springfield	$38,930	$5,104
121	Sunapee	$38,884	$8,228
212	Unity	$29,737	$3,445
124	Washington	$38,701	$4,699

== See also ==
- New Hampshire communities by household income
- List of cities and towns in New Hampshire
