= Ironbrand =

Ironbrand is a novel by John Morressy published in 1980.

== Plot summary ==
Ironbrand is a novel in which three brothers each inherit one of the swords of their father.

== Reception ==
Greg Costikyan reviewed Ironbrand in Ares Magazine #5 and commented that "John Morressy's Ironbrand is a pretty decent novel. The vast amount of trash fantasy published of late makes one prepare to wince upon opening any fantasy novel, but the first trepidation upon glancing at Ironbrand is rapidly lost through involvement in the story."
