= Breed Batcheller =

Breed Batcheller was an early settler of Roxbury, New Hampshire. He was said to have been unsympathetic to the rebels in the American Revolutionary War, and therefore run out of town, ending up in hiding in Batcheller's Cave for the Summer of 1777.

== Early life ==
Breed Batcheller was born December 11, 1740. He learned surveying in Brookfield, Massachusetts.

The first town meeting of Packersfield, New Hampshire, later renamed Nelson, New Hampshire), was held in his home.

He was a major in the Keene, New Hampshire militia as of the 1773 roll.

== American Revolutionary War ==
In 1775, he joined in the march to Battles of Lexington and Concord, but returned to New Hampshire before the Battle of Bunker Hill and became an advocate against the rebellion. He hid in Batcheller's Cave, before fleeing to Canada, in 1777.

Breed Batcheller has been noted as a symbol of "a man who just wouldn't keep his mouth shut" and his story one about the tensions between revolutionary fervor and freedom of speech in the American Revolutionary War.
