= Polar Park =

Polar Park may refer to:

- Polar Park (animal park), a wildlife park in the municipality of Bardu in Troms county, Norway
- Polar Park (baseball park), a baseball park in Worcester, Massachusetts

See also

- Polar Bear Provincial Park, in Ontario, Canada
- Polar Caves Park, in New Hampshire
