= Otter Brook (Ashuelot River tributary) =

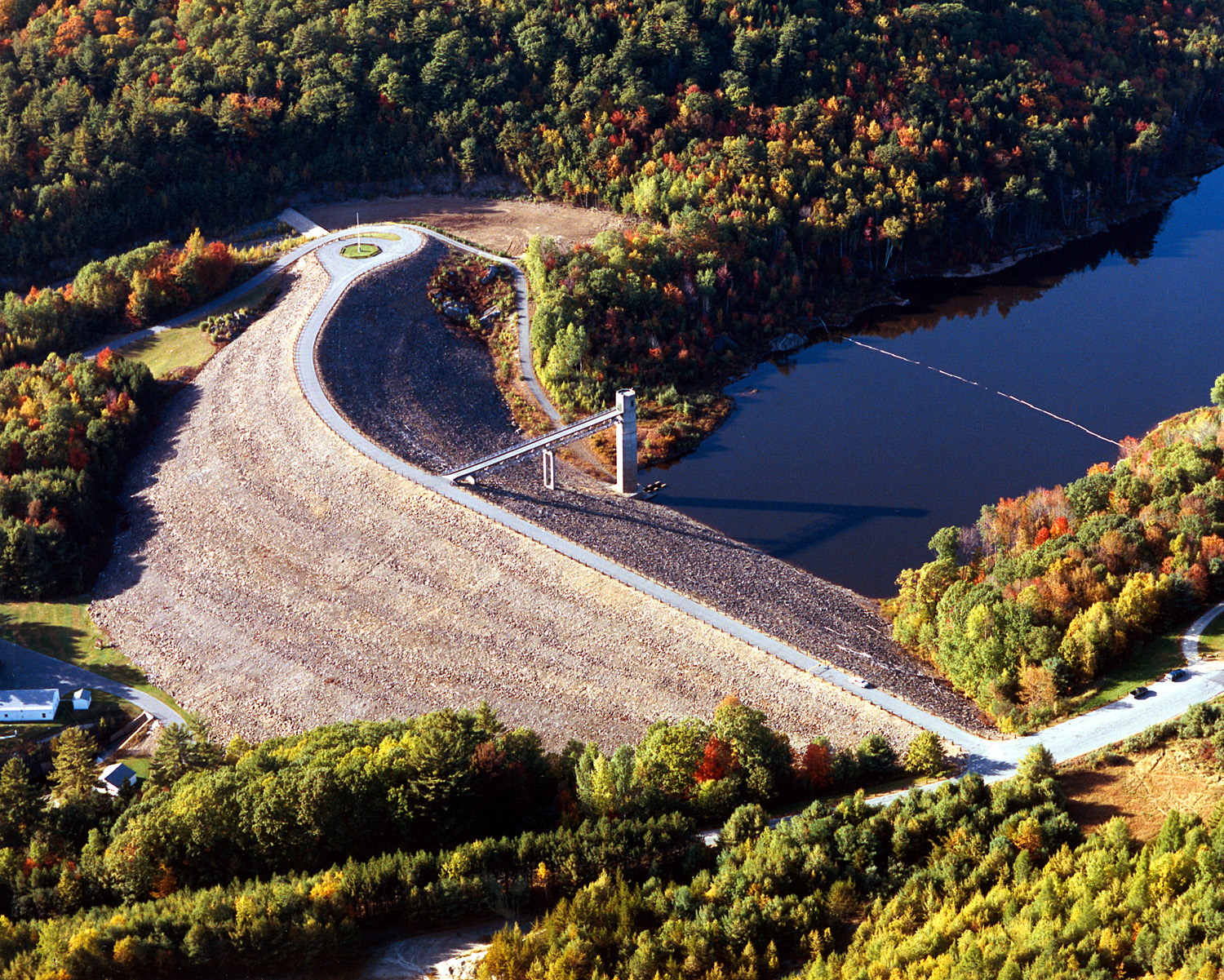
- Otter Brook Lake and Dam in Cheshire County, New Hampshire

- Location within New Hampshire Location within the United States

Location
- Country: United States
- State: New Hampshire
- County: Cheshire
- Towns and city: Stoddard, Nelson, Sullivan, Roxbury, Keene

Physical characteristics
- Source: Chandler Meadow
  - location: Stoddard
  - coordinates: 43°3′24″N 72°7′57″W
  - elevation: 1,276 ft (389 m)
- Mouth: The Branch
  - location: Keene
  - coordinates: 42°54′53″N 72°14′16″W
  - elevation: 560 ft (170 m)
- Length: 13.2 mi (21.2 km)

Basin features
- Tributaries
  - left: Wheeler Brook, Roaring Brook
  - right: Robinson Brook, Davis Brook, Bolster Brook, Spaulding Brook, Hubbard Brook, Ferry Brook

Otter Brook is a 13.2-mile-long (21.2 km) river located in southwestern New Hampshire in the United States. It is a tributary of The Branch of the Ashuelot River, itself a tributary of the Connecticut River, which flows to Long Island Sound.

Otter Brook begins at Chandler Meadow, in the town of Stoddard, New Hampshire. It flows southwest through the towns of Nelson, Sullivan, and Roxbury, eventually entering the city of Keene, where it joins Minnewawa Brook to form The Branch.

The brook passes through Ellis Reservoir (a small lake in Sullivan) and Otter Brook Lake, a flood control reservoir built on the boundary between Keene and Roxbury. The dam which created Otter Brook lake was completed in 1958. From the village of East Sullivan to Otter Brook Lake, the brook is followed by New Hampshire Route 9.

== See also ==
- List of rivers of New Hampshire
