= The Branch =

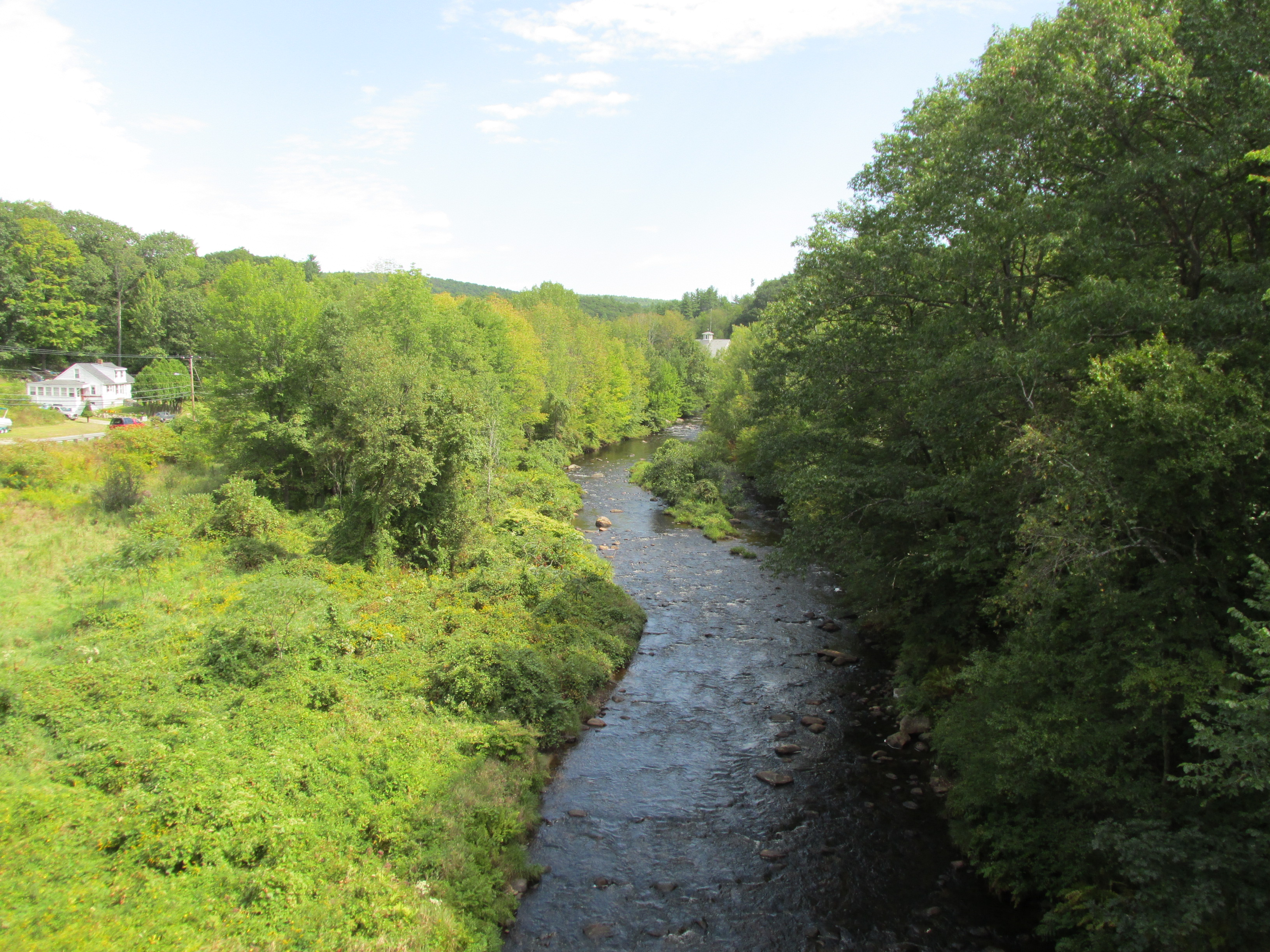
- The Branch

- Location within New Hampshire Location within the United States

Location
- Country: United States
- State: New Hampshire
- County: Cheshire
- City: Keene

Physical characteristics
- Source: Confluence of Otter Brook and Minnewawa Brook
  - location: Keene
  - coordinates: 42°54′53″N 72°14′15″W
  - elevation: 558 ft (170 m)
- Mouth: Ashuelot River
  - location: Keene
  - coordinates: 42°55′8″N 72°16′43″W
  - elevation: 463 ft (141 m)
- Length: 2.6 mi (4.2 km)

Basin features
- Tributaries
  - left: Beaver Brook

The Branch is a 2.6-mile-long (4.2 km) river located entirely in the city of Keene, in southwestern New Hampshire in the United States. It is a tributary of the Ashuelot River, itself a tributary of the Connecticut River, which flows to Long Island Sound.

While itself a very short river, The Branch is formed by the confluence of the much-longer Otter Brook and Minnewawa Brook and was sometimes considered in the past to be part of Otter Brook. A 1982 decision by the federal Board on Geographic Names established the name "The Branch". Variant names cited by the Board include "Branch of Ashuelot", "Otter Branch", and "Otter Brook".

The Branch is paralleled for its entire length by New Hampshire Route 101.

== See also ==
- Stone Arch Bridge (Keene, New Hampshire)
- List of rivers of New Hampshire
