= Apple Hill Center for Chamber Music =

Music and teaching center in the United States

Coordinates: 42.97555°N 72.17562°W

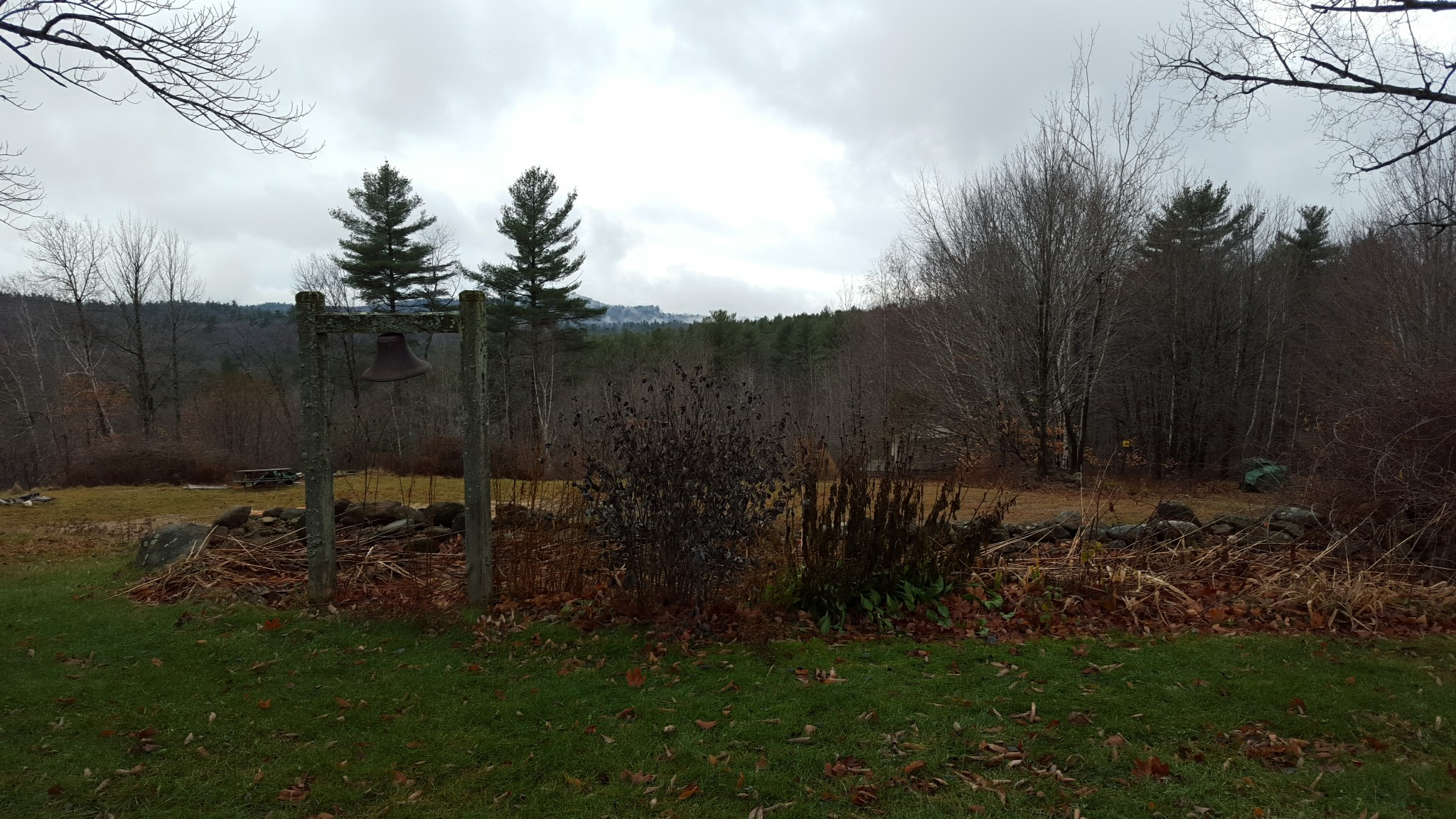
The lunch bell at the Apple Hill Center

Apple Hill Center for Chamber Music is a center of chamber music performance and education, founded in 1971 and situated on 100 acres (40 ha) of fields and woodlands in Nelson, New Hampshire, in the United States.

== History ==
Apple Hill Center for Chamber Music was founded in 1971, with the Apple Hill Chamber Players as the center's ensemble in residence. The Apple Hill String Quartet was founded in 2007 as a successor ensemble to the Chamber Players. The current members of the AHSQ are violinists Elise Kuder and Jesse MacDonald, violist Mike Kelley, and cellist Jacob MacKay. During the summer, the quartet members serve as music directors of Apple Hill's five Chamber Music Workshop sessions, and of the concomitant Tuesday Night Summer Concert Series which runs from mid-June through August. During the rest of the year, the AHSQ performs over a dozen concerts in the New England region, and tours both nationally and internationally, working with music students and teachers around the world.

In 2015, Apple Hill Center for Chamber Music won the "CMAcclaim Award" from Chamber Music America.

== About ==
It is stewarded by the organization's executive director, Sam Bergman, and its ensemble-in-residence, the Apple Hill String Quartet, who serve as the center's artistic co-directors. These professional musicians present concerts and educational workshops throughout the world and, during the summer, teach and coach chamber music to participants of all ages and levels at Apple Hill's Chamber Music Workshop.

Each summer, Apple Hill welcomes 300 students and 45 faculty to the Workshop program. Over 12,000 students have attended since the early 1970s.
