= Stone Arch Bridge (Keene, New Hampshire) =

- U.S. National Register of Historic Places
- NH State Register of Historic Places
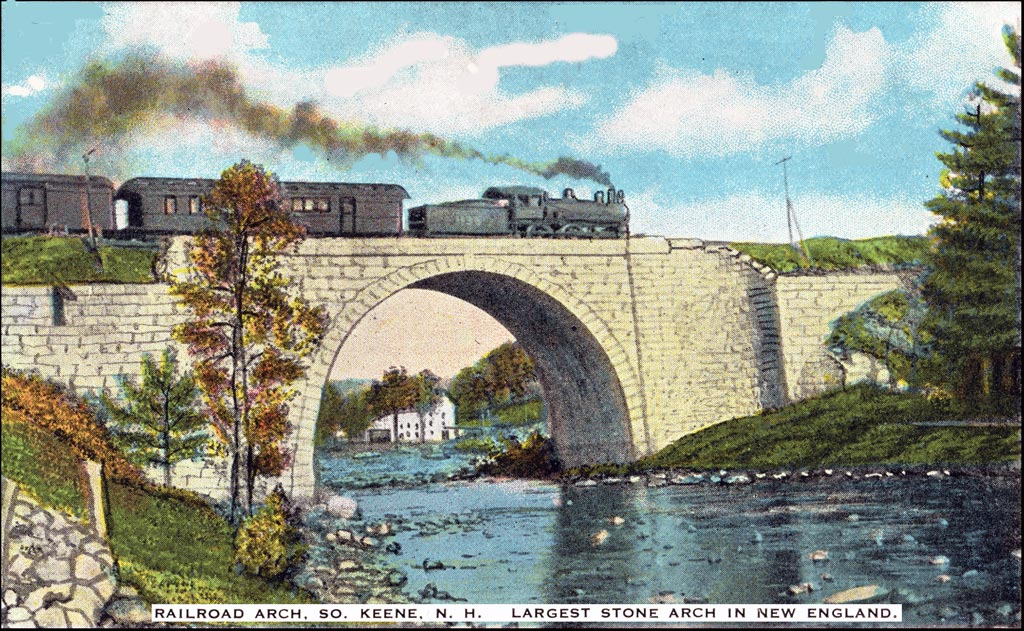
- Postcard image, early 20th century

- Location within New Hampshire Location within the United States
- Location: Mile 89.41 of the Cheshire Railroad over Branch River, between Route 101 and Swanzey Factory Road, Keene, New Hampshire
- Coordinates: 42°54′51″N 72°15′11″W
- Area: less than one acre
- Built: 1847
- Architect: Lucian Tilton
- Architectural style: Stone arch bridge
- NRHP reference No.: 12000504

Significant dates
- Added to NRHP: August 14, 2012
- Designated NHSRHP: October 30, 2006

The Stone Arch Bridge is a stone arch railroad bridge in Keene, New Hampshire, United States. Built in 1847 to carry the Cheshire Railroad, it is one of the best-preserved pre-1850 stone arch bridges in the nation. The bridge was listed on the National Register of Historic Places in 2012, and the New Hampshire State Register of Historic Places in 2006. It now carries a multi-purpose rail trail.

== Description and history ==
The Cheshire Railroad Stone Arch Bridge is located in southeastern Keene, in what is today a comparatively rural setting. It is located at mile marker 89.41 of the former Cheshire Railroad, about 300 feet (91 m) south of the Cheshire Rail Trail's junction with Marlboro Street (New Hampshire Route 101). Its central feature is a massive granite arch, spanning the river known as The Branch. The arch has a span of 68 feet 9 inches (20.96 m), a width of 27 feet 1 inch (8.26 m), and a rise of about 48 feet (15 m) above the typical water level. The arch is buttressed by broad wing walls, which are, like the arch itself, finished in ashlar granite. The wing walls enclose an earthen causeway that give the entire structure an effective length of about 700 feet (210 m).

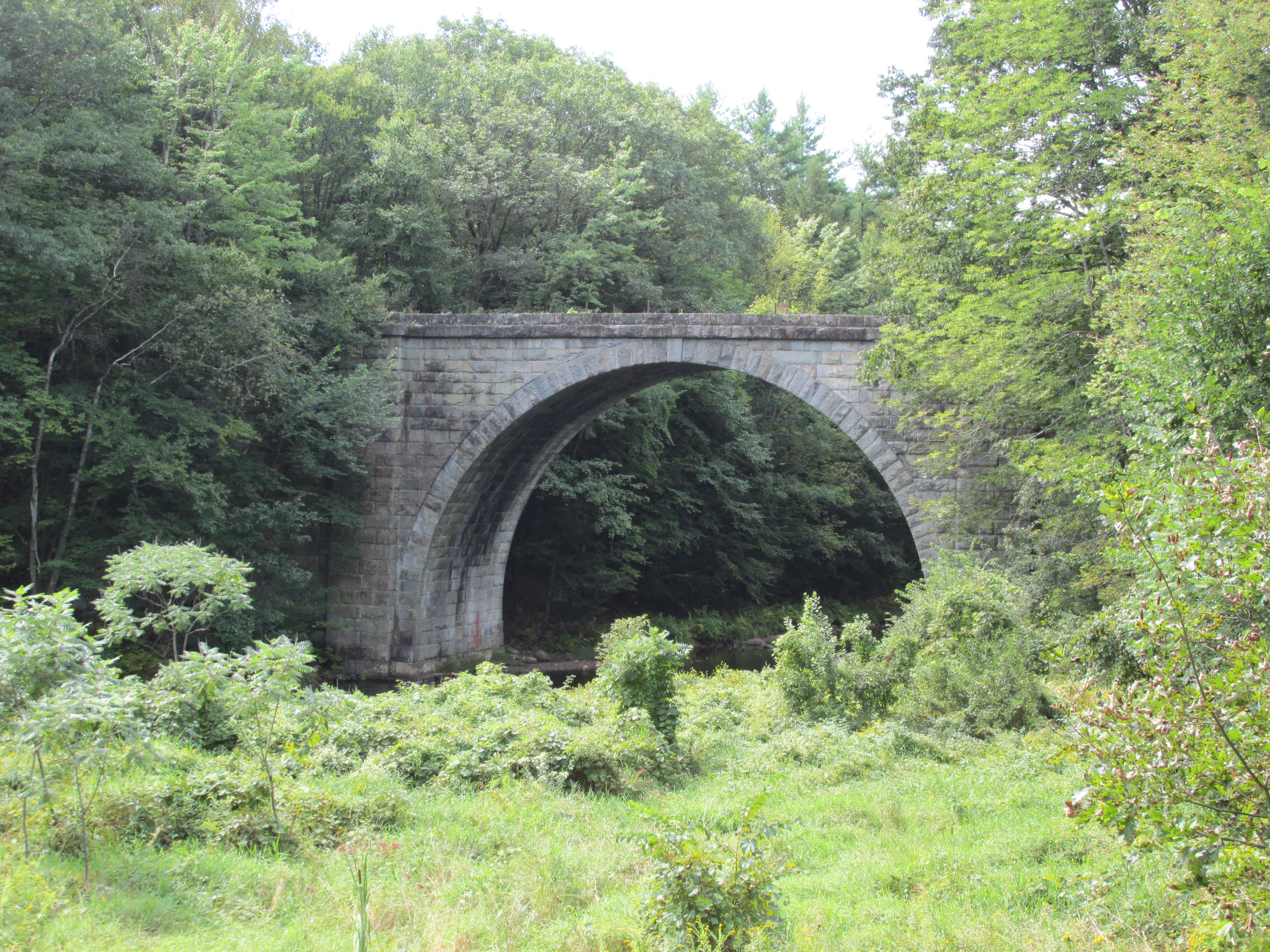
The bridge in 2013

The bridge was built in 1847 by the Cheshire Railroad, which was built to provide service between Fitchburg, Massachusetts, and Bellows Falls, Vermont. The bridge was designed by Lucian Tilton, probably with the assistance of William Scollay Whitwell, both of whom achieved some renown for their railroad engineering and other public works projects. The bridge was one of the largest stone arch bridges in the nation at the time of its construction, and was noted for its finely crafted finish. The line was formally abandoned in 1972, and much of its New Hampshire right of way was acquired by the state in the 1990s. The bridge now carries the multi-use Cheshire Rail Trail.

== See also ==
- National Register of Historic Places listings in Cheshire County, New Hampshire
- List of bridges on the National Register of Historic Places in New Hampshire
