= Granite Gorge Ski Area =

Downhill ski resort

- Interactive map of Granite Gorge Ski Area
- Location: Roxbury, New Hampshire, USA
- Mountain: Pinnacle Peak
- Nearest city: Keene, New Hampshire
- Coordinates: 42°58′15″N 72°12′44″W
- Status: Operating
- Vertical: 390 feet (120 m)
- Trails: 19; 39% Novice; 16% Intermediate; 48% Expert
- Lift system: 1 Double, 1 Tow
- Website: granitegorge.com

Granite Gorge is a small downhill ski resort in southwest New Hampshire, United States. It is located on Pinnacle Mountain in the town of Roxbury, 5 miles (8 km) east of downtown Keene on New Hampshire Route 9. The resort is the reincarnation of the former Pinnacle Peak Ski Area, which operated from 1959 to 1977. The current resort opened in 2003.

It has a 390-foot (120 m) vertical drop, one chairlift (the Pinnacle Express double chairlift), one rope tow, and one magic carpet. The ski area has snowmaking. The 50-acre (20 ha) site includes 14 kilometers of cross-country ski trails.

Terrain parks at Granite Gorge include the signature VW bus and the Bag Jump. The resort offers Cosmic Tubing with glow lighting and a DJ on Saturday nights.
