= Munsonville, New Hampshire =

Unincorporated community in New Hampshire, United States

- Unincorporated community
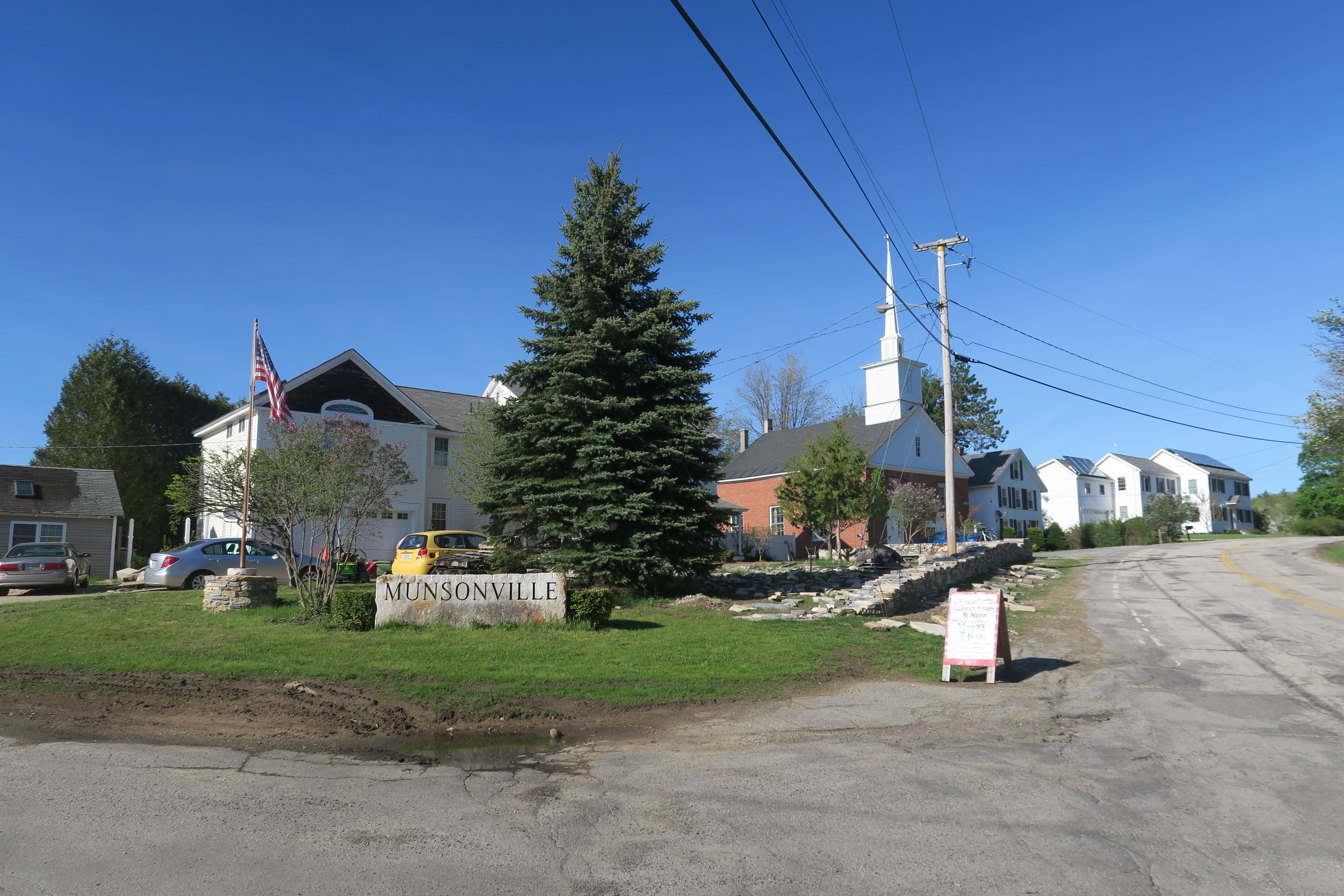
- Munsonville sign

- Location within New Hampshire Location within the United States
- Coordinates: 43°0′51″N 72°08′55″W
- Country: United States
- State: New Hampshire
- County: Cheshire
- Town: Nelson
- Elevation: 1,260 ft (380 m)
- Time zone: UTC-5 (Eastern (EST))
  - Summer (DST): UTC-4 (EDT)
- ZIP code: 03457
- Area code: 603
- GNIS feature ID: 868664

Munsonville is an unincorporated community in the town of Nelson in Cheshire County, New Hampshire. It is located in the northwestern corner of Nelson, around the outlet of Granite Lake.

New Hampshire Route 9, a major east–west highway in the state connecting Concord and Keene, bypasses Munsonville to the south. (The highway ran through the center of the village until the 1990s.)

"Munsonville", "Stoddard" and "Nelson" are all valid place names used for the 03457 ZIP code.

== Notable people ==
- Joe Dobson, Major League Baseball pitcher who lived in Munsonville after his playing career was over
- Ralph Page, contra dance caller and authority on American folk dance
- Paul Swingle, former Major League Baseball pitcher with the California Angels
