= Stinson Lake, New Hampshire =

Unincorporated community in New Hampshire, United States

- Unincorporated community
- Location within New Hampshire Location within the United States
- Coordinates: 43°51′41″N 71°48′29″W
- Country: United States
- State: New Hampshire
- County: Grafton
- Town: Rumney
- Elevation: 1,332 ft (406 m)
- Time zone: UTC-5 (Eastern (EST))
  - Summer (DST): UTC-4 (EDT)
- Area code: 603
- GNIS feature ID: 872743

Stinson Lake is an unincorporated community in the town of Rumney in Grafton County, New Hampshire, United States. It is located at the south end of Stinson Lake, around the lake's outlet. The village is 4 miles (6 km) north of the village of Rumney, via Stinson Lake Road.
