= Stinson Lake =

Lake in New Hampshire, United States

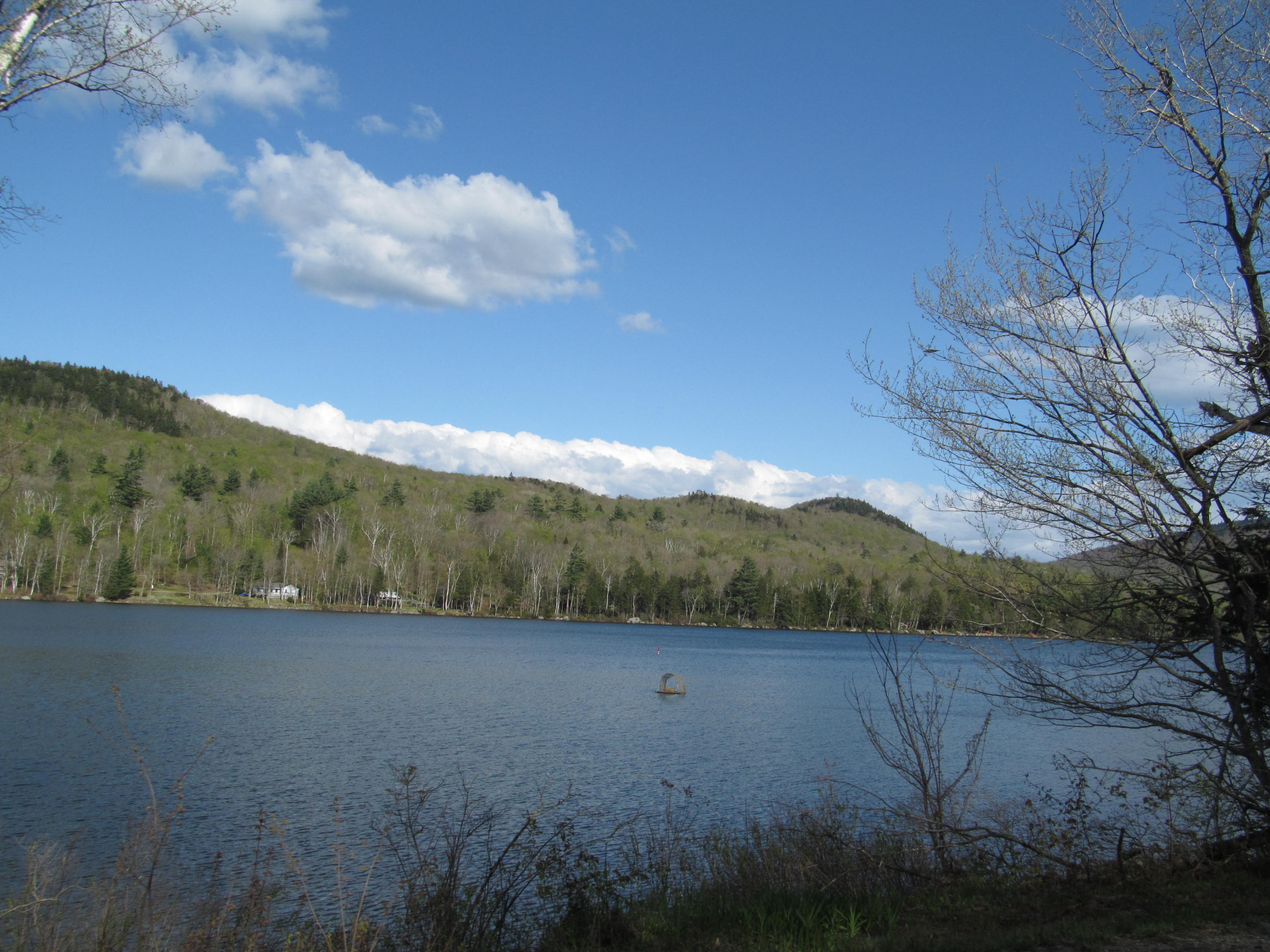

- Location within New Hampshire Location within the United States
- Location: Grafton County, New Hampshire
- Coordinates: 43°52′0″N 71°47′57″W
- Primary inflows: Sucker Brook
- Primary outflows: Stinson Brook
- Basin countries: United States
- Max. length: 1.6 mi (2.6 km)
- Max. width: 0.6 mi (0.97 km)
- Surface area: 342 acres (1.38 km^{2})
- Average depth: 35 ft (11 m)
- Max. depth: 77 ft (23 m)
- Surface elevation: 1,303 ft (397 m)
- Settlements: Stinson Lake (town of Rumney)

Stinson Lake is a 342-acre (1.38 km^{2}) water body located in the town of Rumney in Grafton County, New Hampshire, United States. The lake is in the southern part of the White Mountains and is the largest lake in the White Mountain National Forest. Water from Stinson Lake flows via Stinson Brook, the Baker River, and the Pemigewasset River to the Merrimack River.

The lake is a result of glacier deposits. It has a maximum depth of 77 feet (23 m), with a few shallow banks around the southern rim. It has a cove to the southwest with a dam to stabilize the lake level. Stinson is one of the few lakes around the region without parasitic plants. Its waters are very clear, with visibility to 25 feet (7.6 m) of depth.

Stinson Lake lies in the northern corner of Rumney, just south of the town boundary with Ellsworth and northwest of 2,900-foot (880 m) Stinson Mountain. Most of the lake is fronted by private property and cabins, but boating access is available next to the former Stinson Lake Store on the western side of the lake.

Hiking trails lead from near Stinson Lake southeast to the summit of Stinson Mountain and north to Mount Kineo, Mount Carr, and the Three Ponds area. The village of Stinson Lake is at the lake's outlet, at the top of a long climb up the paved Stinson Lake Road from the village of Rumney. Stinson Lake Road is open year-round, while the gravel road from Ellsworth and Campton is only open from late spring through early fall.

The lake is classified as a cold- and warmwater fishery, with observed species including rainbow trout, lake trout, smallmouth bass, chain pickerel, and brown bullhead.

== See also ==
- List of lakes in New Hampshire
