= Ellsworth, New Hampshire =

- Town
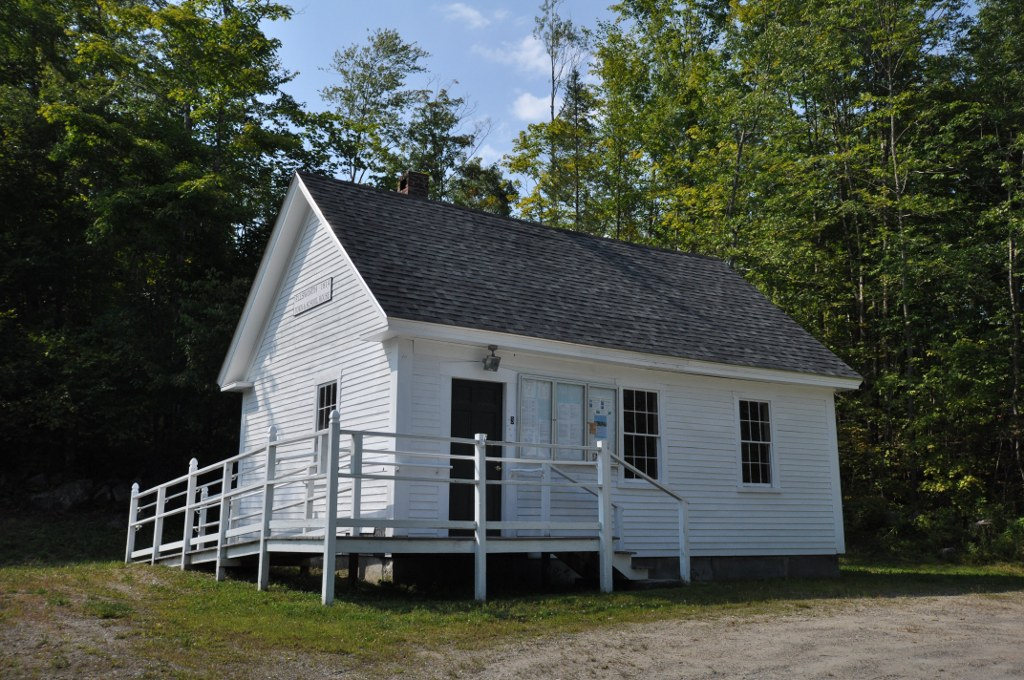
- Town hall

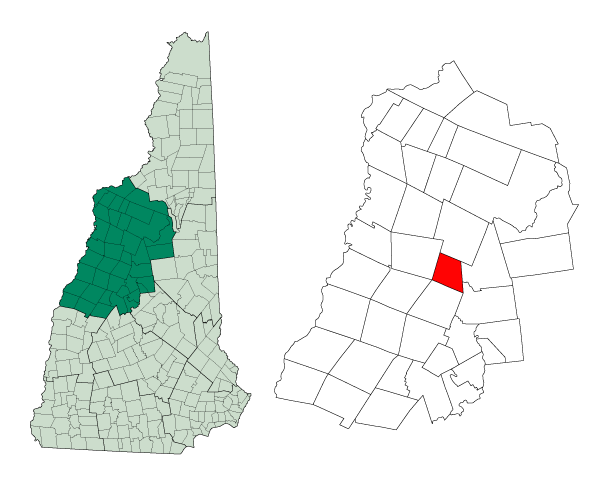
- Location in Grafton County, New Hampshire
- Coordinates: 43°54′12″N 71°46′14″W
- Country: United States
- State: New Hampshire
- County: Grafton
- Incorporated: 1769

Area
  - Total: 21.5 sq mi (55.8 km^{2})
  - Land: 21.4 sq mi (55.5 km^{2})
  - Water: 0.12 sq mi (0.3 km^{2}) 0.58%
- Elevation: 1,595 ft (486 m)

Population (2020)
  - Total: 93
  - Density: 4.4/sq mi (1.7/km^{2})
- Time zone: UTC-5 (Eastern)
  - Summer (DST): UTC-4 (Eastern)
- ZIP codes: 03223 (Campton/Ellsworth); 03266 (Rumney)
- Area code: 603
- FIPS code: 33-23860
- GNIS feature ID: 873589

Ellsworth is a town in Grafton County, New Hampshire, United States. The population was 93 at the 2020 census.

Ellsworth is the only dry town in New Hampshire.

== History ==
The town was originally known as "Trecothick", after Barlow Trecothick, a Bostonian who moved to London. He was an alderman, a Member of Parliament (MP), and a Lord Mayor of the City of London. He had a country estate at Addington, London, now called Addington Palace.

The name of the town was changed to "Ellsworth" in 1802, in honor of Chief Justice Oliver Ellsworth.

The first census of the town, in 1800, reported 47 residents.

== Geography ==
According to the United States Census Bureau, the town has a total area of 21.5 square miles (55.8 km^{2}), of which 21.4 square miles (55.5 km^{2}) are land and 0.1 square miles (0.3 km^{2}) are water, comprising 0.58% of the town. The town is drained in the north by Hubbard Brook and in the south by West Branch Brook, except for the southwestern corner, which is drained by Sucker Brook, a tributary of Stinson Lake in neighboring Rumney. Hubbard and West Branch brooks flow east to the Pemigewasset River, while Stinson Lake drains south to the Baker River, a tributary of the Pemigewasset. Ellsworth lies fully within the Merrimack River watershed.

The highest point in Ellsworth is the summit of Mount Kineo in the northern part of town, at 3,313 feet (1,010 m) above sea level. The entire town is within the White Mountain National Forest, though with numerous private inholdings. The Hubbard Brook Experimental Forest occupies the northern part of the town, on the northern side of Mount Kineo.

== Demographics ==
Historical population
Census	Pop.	Note	%±
1800	47		—
1810	142		202.1%
1820	213		50.0%
1830	234		9.9%
1840	300		28.2%
1850	320		6.7%
1860	302		−5.6%
1870	193		−36.1%
1880	209		8.3%
1890	150		−28.2%
1900	107		−28.7%
1910	46		−57.0%
1920	30		−34.8%
1930	28		−6.7%
1940	26		−7.1%
1950	24		−7.7%
1960	3		−87.5%
1970	13		333.3%
1980	53		307.7%
1990	74		39.6%
2000	87		17.6%
2010	83		−4.6%
2020	93		12.0%
U.S. Decennial Census

At the 2000 census there were 87 people in 32 households, including 19 families, in the town. The population density was 4.1 people per square mile (1.6/km^{2}). There were 72 housing units at an average density of 3.4 per square mile (1.3/km^{2}). The racial makeup of the town was 96.55% White, and 3.45% Native American.

Of the 32 households 34.4% had children under the age of 18 living with them, 53.1% were married couples living together, none had a female householder with no husband present, and 40.6% were non-families. 18.8% of households were one person and 12.5% were one person aged 65 or older. The average household size was 2.72 and the average family size was 3.37.

The age distribution was 29.9% under the age of 18, 3.4% from 18 to 24, 23.0% from 25 to 44, 28.7% from 45 to 64, and 14.9% 65 or older. The median age was 41 years. For every 100 females, there were 102.3 males. For every 100 females age 18 and over, there were 110.3 males.

The median household income was $33,750 and the median family income was $34,750. Males had a median income of $26,500 versus $21,250 for females. The per capita income for the town was $22,705. None of the population and none of the families were below the poverty line.
