= Polar Caves Park =

Talus caves in New Hampshire, United States

- Interactive map of Polar Caves Park
- Location: Rumney, New Hampshire, U.S.
- Coordinates: 43°46′51″N 71°46′56″W
- Status: Operating
- Opened: 1922
- Owner: Privately owned
- Theme: Granite caves, nature trails, animal park
- Slogan: "An outdoor experience of glacial proportions."
- Operating season: mid-May to mid-October
- Website: polarcaves.com

Polar Caves Park is a set of glacially-formed talus caves located in New Hampshire's White Mountains region, in the United States. The caves were formed during the last ice age from granite boulders and are so named because the deepest cave is cold enough to allow snow to linger long into the summer.

The caves are a popular tourist destination. The park contains nine granite boulder caves connected by a series of boardwalks. Additional attractions have also been added.

Said to have been discovered by local children, the park was opened in 1922 by Edwin Collishaw. The 2022 season celebrated its 100th year in operation.

In October 2026, the park's Mysterious Hanging Boulder, an 80-ton attraction, fell on the last day of the season.
