= John Morressy =

American novelist

- Born: December 8, 1930; Brooklyn, New York
- Died: March 20, 2006 (aged 75); Sullivan, New Hampshire, United States

John Morressy (December 8, 1930 – March 20, 2006) was an American science fiction and fantasy writer and a professor of English at Franklin Pierce College.

He died at Sullivan, New Hampshire where he lived.

== Bibliography ==
=== Novels ===
- The Blackboard Cavalier (1966)
- The Addison Tradition (1968)
- A Long Communion (1974)
- The Humans of Ziax II (1974)
- The Windows of Forever (1975)
- The Extraterritorial (1977)
- The Drought on Ziax II (1978)
- The Juggler (1996)

Del Whitby series

- Starbrat (1972)
- Stardrift (1973; also known as Nail Down the Stars)
- Under a Calculating Star (1975)
- A Law for the Stars (1976)
- Frostworld and Dreamfire (1977)
- The Mansions of Space (1983)

Iron Angel series

- Ironbrand (1980)
- Graymantle (1981)
- Kingsbane (1982)
- The Time of the Annihilator (1985)

Kedrigern series

- A Voice for Princess (1986)
- The Questing of Kedrigern (1987)
- Kedrigern in Wanderland (1988)
- Kedrigern and the Charming Couple (1989)
- A Remembrance for Kedrigern (1990)
- The Domesticated Wizard (2002; omnibus including A Voice for Princess and The Questing of Kedrigern, plus 6 short stories)
- Dudgeon and Dragons (2003; omnibus including Kedrigern in Wanderland and Kedrigern and the Dragon comme il faut-New, plus 8 short stories)

The Apprentice Kedrigern (Young Kedrigern) series

- Young Kedrigern and First Spell (published only in Czech, 1998)
- Young Kedrigern and Search for the Past (published only in Czech, 1999)
- Young Kedrigern: The Making of A Wizard (published only in Czech, 2001)

=== Short fiction ===
Collections

- Other Stories (1983)

Stories

Title	Year	First published	Reprinted/collected	Notes
Conhoon and the fairy dancer	2000	Morressy, John (March 2000). "Conhoon and the fairy dancer". F&SF. 98 (3): 141–160.		Novelette

- "Autumn Sunshine for Moe Joost" (1979)
- "No More Pencils, No More Books" (1979)
- "The Last Jerry Fagin Show" (1980)
- "A Hedge Against Alchemy" (1981)
- "Final Version" (1982; included in 100 Short Short Fantasy Stories)
- "Stoneskin" (1984)
- "Spirits from the Vasty Deep" (1986)
- "Alaska" (1989)
- "Timekeeper" (1990)
- "A Boy and His Wolf: Three Versions of a Fable" (1993; in the anthology Xanadu)
- "The Persistence of Memory" (1998)
- "Laugh Clone Laugh" (Playboy Magazine, May 1986)
- "Father, Dear Father, Come Home With Me Now" (Dragon Magazine, March 1990, pg. 58)
