= Sullivan, New Hampshire =

- Town
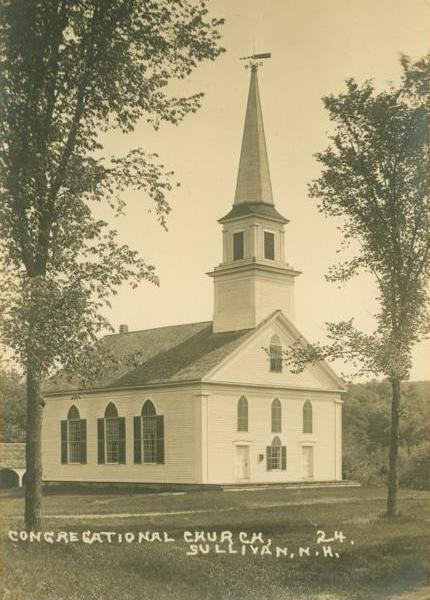
- Congregational Church c. 1915

- Seal

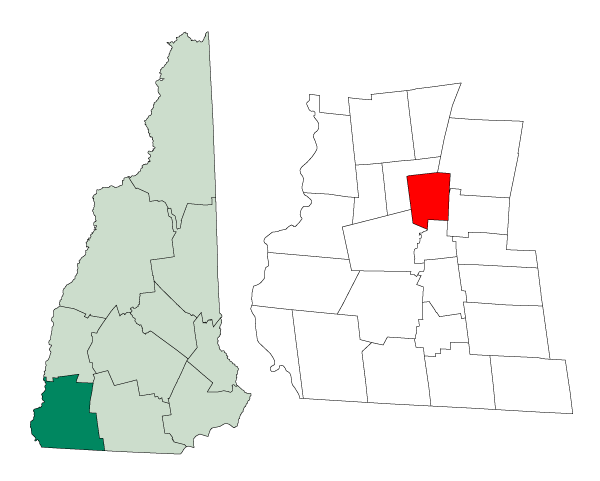
- Location in Cheshire County, New Hampshire
- Coordinates: 43°01′03″N 72°12′54″W
- Country: United States
- State: New Hampshire
- County: Cheshire
- Incorporated: 1787
- Villages: Sullivan; East Sullivan; Ellisville

Area
  - Total: 18.7 sq mi (48.5 km^{2})
  - Land: 18.5 sq mi (48.0 km^{2})
  - Water: 0.19 sq mi (0.5 km^{2}) 1.01%
- Elevation: 1,627 ft (496 m)

Population (2020)
  - Total: 658
  - Density: 35/sq mi (13.7/km^{2})
- Time zone: UTC-5 (Eastern)
  - Summer (DST): UTC-4 (Eastern)
- ZIP code: 03445
- Area code: 603
- FIPS code: 33-74900
- GNIS feature ID: 873731
- Website: townofsullivannh.com

Sullivan is a town in Cheshire County, New Hampshire, United States. The population was 658 at the 2020 census, and an estimated 697 in 2025. It includes the villages of East Sullivan and Ellisville.

== History ==
Named for General John Sullivan and incorporated on September 27, 1787, Sullivan was formed from parts of Gilsum, Keene, Nelson and Stoddard. Farming became the chief occupation. By 1859, the population was 468. In 1867, Sullivan was the first town in New Hampshire to dedicate a monument to its soldiers lost in the Civil War. The monument sits across from the Sullivan Congregational Church.

== Geography ==
According to the United States Census Bureau, the town has an area of 18.7 square miles (48.5 km^{2}), of which 18.5 square miles (48.0 km^{2}) are land and 0.19 square miles (0.5 km^{2}) are water, comprising 1.01% of the town. It is drained by Ferry Brook, Meetinghouse Brook, Spaulding Brook and Otter Brook, all part of the Ashuelot River watershed flowing to the Connecticut River. The highest point in Sullivan is the summit of Boynton Hill at 1,739 feet (530 m), in the northern part of town.

The town is served by New Hampshire Route 9.

=== Adjacent municipalities ===
- Gilsum (northwest)
- Stoddard (northeast)
- Nelson (east)
- Roxbury (south)
- Keene (southwest)

== Demographics ==
Historical population
Census	Pop.	Note	%±
1790	220		—
1800	488		121.8%
1810	516		5.7%
1820	582		12.8%
1830	555		−4.6%
1840	496		−10.6%
1850	468		−5.6%
1860	376		−19.7%
1870	347		−7.7%
1880	382		10.1%
1890	337		−11.8%
1900	287		−14.8%
1910	266		−7.3%
1920	206		−22.6%
1930	192		−6.8%
1940	255		32.8%
1950	272		6.7%
1960	261		−4.0%
1970	376		44.1%
1980	585		55.6%
1990	706		20.7%
2000	746		5.7%
2010	677		−9.2%
2020	658		−2.8%
2024 (est.)	695		5.6%
U.S. Decennial Census

As of the census of 2000, there were 746 people, 282 households, and 208 families residing in the town. The population density was 40.3 inhabitants per square mile (15.6/km^{2}). There were 299 housing units at an average density of 16.2 per square mile (6.2/km^{2}). The racial makeup of the town was 98.39% White, 0.13% African American, 0.94% Native American, 0.27% Asian, and 0.27% from two or more races. Hispanic or Latino of any race were 0.40% of the population.

There were 282 households, out of which 30.9% had children under the age of 18 living with them, 59.2% were married couples living together, 8.2% had a female householder with no husband present, and 25.9% were non-families. 19.1% of all households were made up of individuals, and 5.0% had someone living alone who was 65 years of age or older. The average household size was 2.65 and the average family size was 3.00.

In the town, the population was spread out, with 25.3% under the age of 18, 6.3% from 18 to 24, 30.6% from 25 to 44, 28.4% from 45 to 64, and 9.4% who were 65 years of age or older. The median age was 38 years. For every 100 females, there were 101.1 males. For every 100 females age 18 and over, there were 100.4 males.

The median income for a household in the town was $51,058, and the median income for a family was $52,386. Males had a median income of $30,900 versus $24,896 for females. The per capita income for the town was $21,143. About 0.9% of families and 4.5% of the population were below the poverty line, including 3.5% of those under age 18 and none of those age 65 or over.

== Education ==
The town of Sullivan operates its own independent school district and school administrative unit, governed by a five-member elected school board. Students in Sullivan attend neighboring Nelson Elementary School for kindergarten through grade six, Keene Middle School for grades seven and eight, and Keene High School.

From 1960 to 2013, Sullivan had been a member of the cooperative Monadnock Regional School District. Its elementary-aged students attended school at the Sullivan Central School on Centre Street (until its closure in 2012) and neighboring Gilsum Elementary School. Middle and high school students attended Monadnock Regional High School in Swanzey.

At the March 2012 annual town meeting, residents of Sullivan voted to begin the process of withdrawing from the cooperative school district. A withdrawal plan was passed by a district study committee and approved by school district voters on November 27, 2012. On July 1, 2013, the town began operating its own independent school district. By law, the former Sullivan Central School building has been reacquired by the new school district, but is not intended to be reopened.

== Notable people ==
- Charles C. Comstock (1818–1900), businessman, US congressman for Michigan
- David H. Mason (1818–1873), US congressman for Massachusetts
- Rufus Osgood Mason (1830–1903), physician, early researcher in parapsychology and hypnotherapy
- John Morressy (1930–2006), writer; professor of English at Franklin Pierce College
