= Roxbury, New Hampshire =

- Town
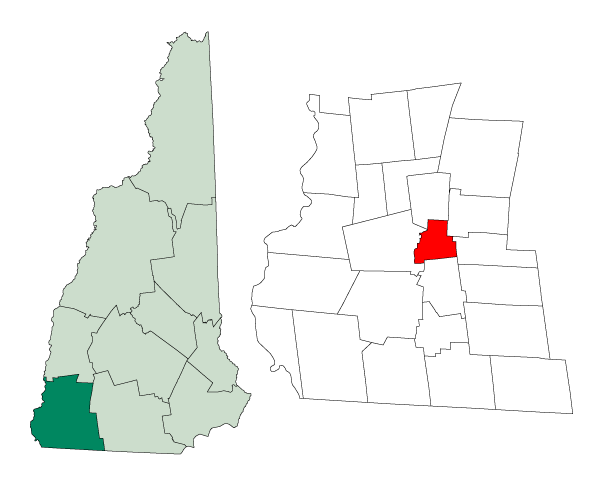
- Location in Cheshire County, New Hampshire
- Coordinates: 42°57′09″N 72°12′05″W
- Country: United States
- State: New Hampshire
- County: Cheshire
- Incorporated: 1812
- Village: Roxbury Center

Area
  - Total: 12.2 sq mi (31.6 km^{2})
  - Land: 11.9 sq mi (30.8 km^{2})
  - Water: 0.31 sq mi (0.8 km^{2}) 2.40%
- Elevation: 1,342 ft (409 m)

Population (2020)
  - Total: 220
  - Density: 18/sq mi (7.1/km^{2})
- Time zone: UTC-5 (Eastern)
  - Summer (DST): UTC-4 (Eastern)
- ZIP codes: 03431 (Keene); 03445 (Sullivan); 03455 (Marlborough); 03457 (Nelson)
- Area code: 603
- FIPS code: 33-65700
- GNIS feature ID: 873710
- Website: www.roxburynh.org

Roxbury is a town in Cheshire County, New Hampshire, United States. The population was 220 at the 2020 census, and was estimated to also be 220 in 2025.

== History ==
The smallest town in Cheshire County, Roxbury was incorporated in 1812 from portions of Nelson, Marlborough, and Keene. By then, settlers had established agriculture among the rolling hillsides in the area, and a community had developed at what is now called Roxbury Center. It was a "hill farm" community with some scattered small mills. Roxbury's granite quarries, among the most extensive in the Granite State at the time, provided some of the stone for the capitol building of New York in Albany.

Much of Roxbury was abandoned in the Civil War, as a very high percentage of its male population was killed in battle. Other residents left after the Civil War to seek a better life in local mill villages or in the American Midwest. Otter Brook Lake, constructed by the Army Corps of Engineers in 1956–1958 to control flooding in the Ashuelot and Connecticut River valleys, occupies part of the town's western boundary.

== Geography ==
According to the United States Census Bureau, the town has a total area of 12.2 square miles (31.6 km^{2}), of which 11.9 square miles (30.8 km^{2}) are land and 0.3 square miles (0.8 km^{2}) are water, comprising 2.40% of the town. The highest point in Roxbury is the summit Bassett Hill, at 1,644 feet (501 m) above sea level.

Granite Gorge Ski Area on Pinnacle Mountain is located in the town's northwestern corner, along New Hampshire Route 9.

Batcheller's Cave is noted for its place in history as the hiding place of Breed Batcheller, who was edged out of town for failing to join the rebellion against the crown during the Revolutionary War.

=== Adjacent municipalities ===
- Sullivan (north)
- Nelson (northeast)
- Harrisville (east)
- Marlborough (south)
- Keene (west)

== Demographics ==
Historical population
Census	Pop.	Note	%±
1820	366		—
1830	322		−12.0%
1840	286		−11.2%
1850	260		−9.1%
1860	212		−18.5%
1870	174		−17.9%
1880	126		−27.6%
1890	129		2.4%
1900	100		−22.5%
1910	66		−34.0%
1920	56		−15.2%
1930	53		−5.4%
1940	113		113.2%
1950	117		3.5%
1960	137		17.1%
1970	161		17.5%
1980	190		18.0%
1990	248		30.5%
2000	237		−4.4%
2010	229		−3.4%
2020	220		−3.9%
2024 (est.)	225		2.3%
U.S. Decennial Census

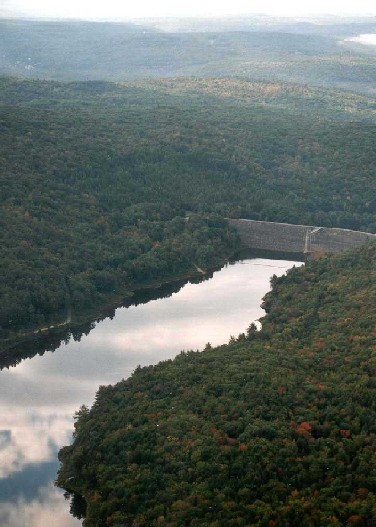
Otter Brook Lake in Roxbury

At the 2000 census, there were 237 people, 89 households and 66 families residing in the town. The population density was 19.9 per square mile (7.7/km^{2}). There were 90 housing units at an average density of 7.6 per square mile (2.9/km^{2}). The racial makeup of the town was 98.73% White, 0.42% Asian, and 0.84% from two or more races.

There were 89 households, of which 32.6% had children under the age of 18 living with them, 67.4% were married couples living together, 6.7% had a female householder with no husband present, and 25.8% were non-families. 20.2% of all households were made up of individuals, and 5.6% had someone living alone who was 65 years of age or older. The average household size was 2.66 and the average family size was 3.12.

25.3% of the population were under the age of 18, 3.8% from 18 to 24, 28.7% from 25 to 44, 32.9% from 45 to 64, and 9.3% who were 65 years of age or older. The median age was 41 years. For every 100 females, there were 99.2 males. For every 100 females age 18 and over, there were 88.3 males.

The median household income was $49,375 and the median family income was $56,875. Males had a median income of $33,984 and females $23,750. The per capita income for the town was $21,124. None of the families and 0.9% of the population were living below the poverty line.

== Notable people ==
- Joseph Alexander Ames (1816–1872), artist; elder brother of Nathan
- Nathan Ames (1826–1865), patent solicitor; held patent for "revolving stairs," precursor to the escalator
- Breed Batcheller (1740–c. 1777 or later), major early landowner and settler
- Maynard T. Parker (1850–1915), Wisconsin jurist, newspaper editor, legislator
- Cyrus Wakefield (1811–1873), manufacturer of rattan furniture; namesake of Wakefield, Massachusetts
