= Hale's Location, New Hampshire =

- Township
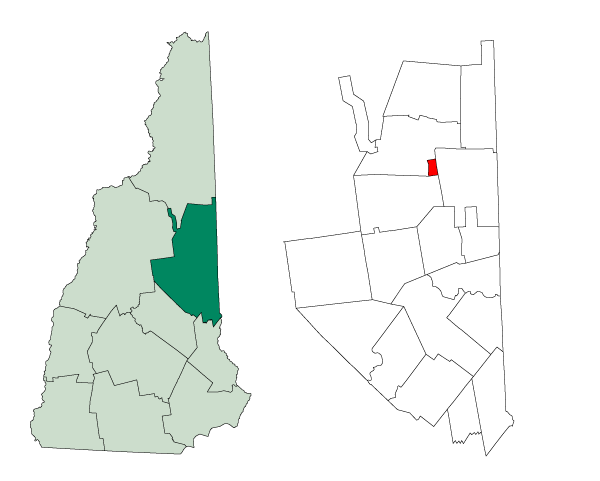
- Location in Carroll County, New Hampshire
- Coordinates: 44°02′21″N 71°10′20″W
- Country: United States
- State: New Hampshire
- County: Carroll County

Area
  - Total: 2.49 sq mi (6.44 km^{2})
  - Land: 2.49 sq mi (6.44 km^{2})
  - Water: 0 sq mi (0 km^{2}) 0%
- Elevation: 600 ft (180 m)

Population (2020)
  - Total: 132
  - Density: 53/sq mi (20.5/km^{2})
- Time zone: UTC-5 (Eastern)
  - Summer (DST): UTC-4 (Eastern)
- ZIP code: 03860 (North Conway)
- Area code: 603
- FIPS code: 33-003-32500
- GNIS feature ID: 871993

Hale's Location is a township in Carroll County, New Hampshire, United States. The population was 132 at the 2020 census, and an estimated 137 in 2025. In New Hampshire, locations, grants, townships (which are different from towns), and purchases are unincorporated portions of a county which are not part of any town and have limited self-government (if any, as many are uninhabited).

== Geography ==
According to the United States Census Bureau, the location has a total area of 6.4 square miles (17 km^{2}), all land, except for mountain streams. The highest point in Hale's Location is White Horse Ledge, at 1,450 feet (440 m) above sea level.

== Demographics ==
Historical population
Census	Pop.	Note	%±
1960	8		—
1980	2		—
2000	58		—
2010	120		106.9%
2020	132		10.0%
U.S. Decennial Census

At the 2020 census there were 132 people, 65 households, and 55 families living in the location. The population density was 53.0 people per square mile (20.5 km^{2}). There were 105 housing units at an average density of 42.2 per square mile (16.3/km^{2}). The racial makeup of the location was 95.5% White and 4.5% two or more races. Of the 65 households, 9.2% had children under the age of 18 living with them, 83.1% were married couples living together, 7.7% had a female householder with no husband present, and 13.8% were non-families. 10.8% of households were one person and 9.2% were one person aged 65 or older.

The age distribution was 1.5% 10 to 14 years, 0.5% 15 to 19 years, 1.5% 25 to 29 years, 0.8% 35 to 39 years, 1.5% 45 to 49 years, 6.8% 55 to 59 years, 10.6% 60 to 64 years, 15.9% 65 to 69 years, 22.7% 70 to 74 years, 21.2% 75 to 79 years, 9.1% 80 to 84 years, and 7.6% 85 years and over. The median age was 71.5 years.
