= Rumney, New Hampshire =

- Town
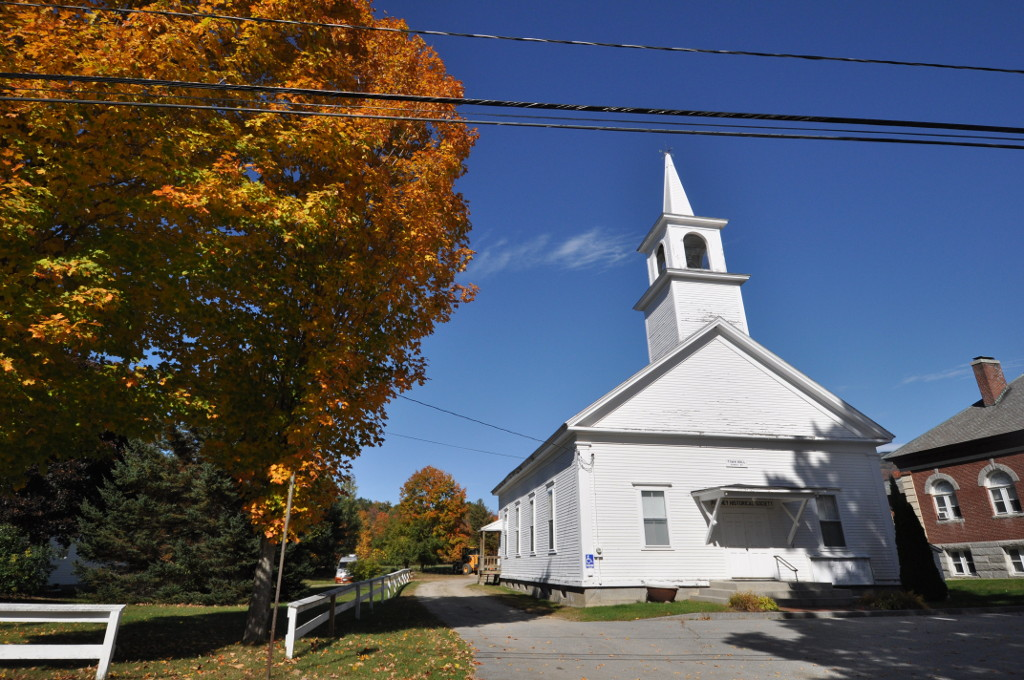
- Town hall

- Seal

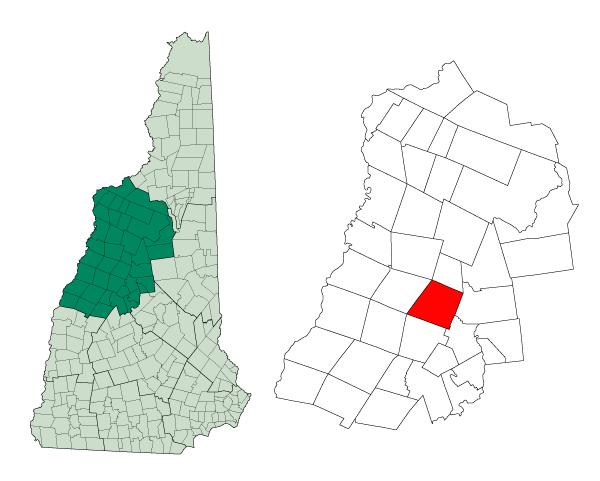
- Location in Grafton County, New Hampshire
- Coordinates: 43°49′37″N 71°48′29″W
- Country: United States
- State: New Hampshire
- County: Grafton
- Incorporated: 1767
- Villages: Rumney; Rumney Depot; Quincy; Stinson Lake; West Rumney

Area
  - Total: 42.6 sq mi (110.4 km^{2})
  - Land: 41.7 sq mi (108.0 km^{2})
  - Water: 0.93 sq mi (2.4 km^{2}) 2.15%
- Elevation: 817 ft (249 m)

Population (2020)
  - Total: 1,498
  - Density: 36/sq mi (13.9/km^{2})
- Time zone: UTC−5 (Eastern)
  - Summer (DST): UTC−4 (Eastern)
- ZIP Code: 03266
- Area code: 603
- FIPS code: 33-65940
- GNIS feature ID: 873711
- Website: www.rumneynh.org

Rumney is a town in Grafton County, New Hampshire, United States. The population was 1,498 at the 2020 census. The town is located at the southern edge of the White Mountain National Forest.

== History ==
Rumney was named after Robert Marsham, 2nd Baron Romney (pronounced Rumney). The town was originally granted in 1761 by Governor Benning Wentworth to settlers from Colchester and East Haddam, Connecticut. It was first settled in 1765; however, some grantees failed to comply with the charter, so Rumney was regranted to another group of settlers in 1767.

Farmers found the town's soil fertile. By 1859, when the population was 1,109, other industries included fifteen sawmills, a large tannery, and a ladder factory. The Boston, Concord and Montreal Railroad commenced service to West Rumney in 1850–1851.

On December 22, 1954, the Automobile License Plate Collectors Association (ALPCA) was founded at Rumney. The ALPCA has since expanded into an international organization with members in all 50 states and in 19 countries.

== Geography ==
According to the United States Census Bureau, the town has a total area of 42.6 square miles (110.4 km^{2}), of which 41.7 square miles (108.0 km^{2}) are land and 0.93 square miles (2.4 km^{2}) are water, comprising 2.15% of the town. The highest point in Rumney is 2,960 feet (902 m) above sea level on the southern slope of Carr Mountain. The Baker River flows from west to east through the center of the town, roughly paralleled by New Hampshire Route 25. The town is part of the Pemigewasset River watershed, leading to the Merrimack River.

The town of Rumney contains several smaller villages. Rumney village, the town's central settlement, lies just north of the Baker River. Directly to the south, across the Baker River and adjacent to Route 25, is the village of Rumney Depot. The village of Stinson Lake, comprising development around the lake of the same name and at the foot of adjacent Stinson Mountain, is in the northern corner of the town, and West Rumney is located along Route 25 near the town's western border.

Rumney is home to Polar Caves Park, which is well known for its geological views and glowing rock formations. It is located along Route 25 near the town's eastern border.

=== Rumney Rocks ===
Rumney Rocks, located between Rumney village and West Rumney, is a rock climbing destination renowned for its sport climbing routes.

The majority of the climbing is found on the numerous small cliff faces on the south face of Rattlesnake Mountain, much of which lies within the White Mountain National Forest. These cliffs are mostly made of schist, with some being granite, and vary from long smooth slabs to wildly overhung roofs and aretes. They range in height, with most falling between 40 and 90 feet (12 and 27 m), but a few reach over 300 feet (91 m).

Most climbs are well bolted, with a few requiring additional protection. The climbs range from 5.0 to 5.15a, with the majority of routes falling between 5.10 and 5.12.

== Demographics ==
Historical population
| Census | Pop. | Note | %± |
|---|---|---|---|
| 1790 | 411 | | — |
| 1800 | 624 | | 51.8% |
| 1810 | 765 | | 22.6% |
| 1820 | 864 | | 12.9% |
| 1830 | 993 | | 14.9% |
| 1840 | 1,110 | | 11.8% |
| 1850 | 1,109 | | −0.1% |
| 1860 | 1,103 | | −0.5% |
| 1870 | 1,165 | | 5.6% |
| 1880 | 1,056 | | −9.4% |
| 1890 | 947 | | −10.3% |
| 1900 | 837 | | −11.6% |
| 1910 | 850 | | 1.6% |
| 1920 | 911 | | 7.2% |
| 1930 | 858 | | −5.8% |
| 1940 | 861 | | 0.3% |
| 1950 | 859 | | −0.2% |
| 1960 | 820 | | −4.5% |
| 1970 | 870 | | 6.1% |
| 1980 | 1,212 | | 39.3% |
| 1990 | 1,446 | | 19.3% |
| 2000 | 1,480 | | 2.4% |
| 2010 | 1,480 | | 0.0% |
| 2020 | 1,498 | | 1.2% |
U.S. Decennial Census

As of the census of 2000, there were 1,480 people, 569 households, and 393 families residing in the town. The population density was 35.3 inhabitants per square mile (13.6/km^{2}). There were 879 housing units at an average density of 21.0 per square mile (8.1/km^{2}). The racial makeup of the town was 98.04% White, 0.41% African American, 0.54% Native American, 0.41% Asian, 0.07% Pacific Islander, 0.20% from other races, and 0.34% from two or more races. Hispanic or Latino of any race were 0.61% of the population.

There were 569 households, out of which 29.9% had children under the age of 18 living with them, 57.5% were married couples living together, 6.3% had a female householder with no husband present, and 30.8% were non-families. Of all households, 23.2% were made up of individuals, and 8.8% had someone living alone who was 65 years of age or older. The average household size was 2.55 and the average family size was 3.00.

In the town, the population was spread out, with 25.4% under the age of 18, 5.5% from 18 to 24, 25.9% from 25 to 44, 27.0% from 45 to 64, and 16.1% who were 65 years of age or older. The median age was 41 years. For every 100 females, there were 102.7 males. For every 100 females age 18 and over, there were 102.2 males.

The median income for a household in the town was $38,125, and the median income for a family was $42,895. Males had a median income of $26,594 versus $21,705 for females. The per capita income for the town was $17,169. About 4.9% of families and 9.5% of the population were below the poverty line, including 15.0% of those under age 18 and 6.7% of those age 65 or over.

== Stereographic cards (c. 1880) ==
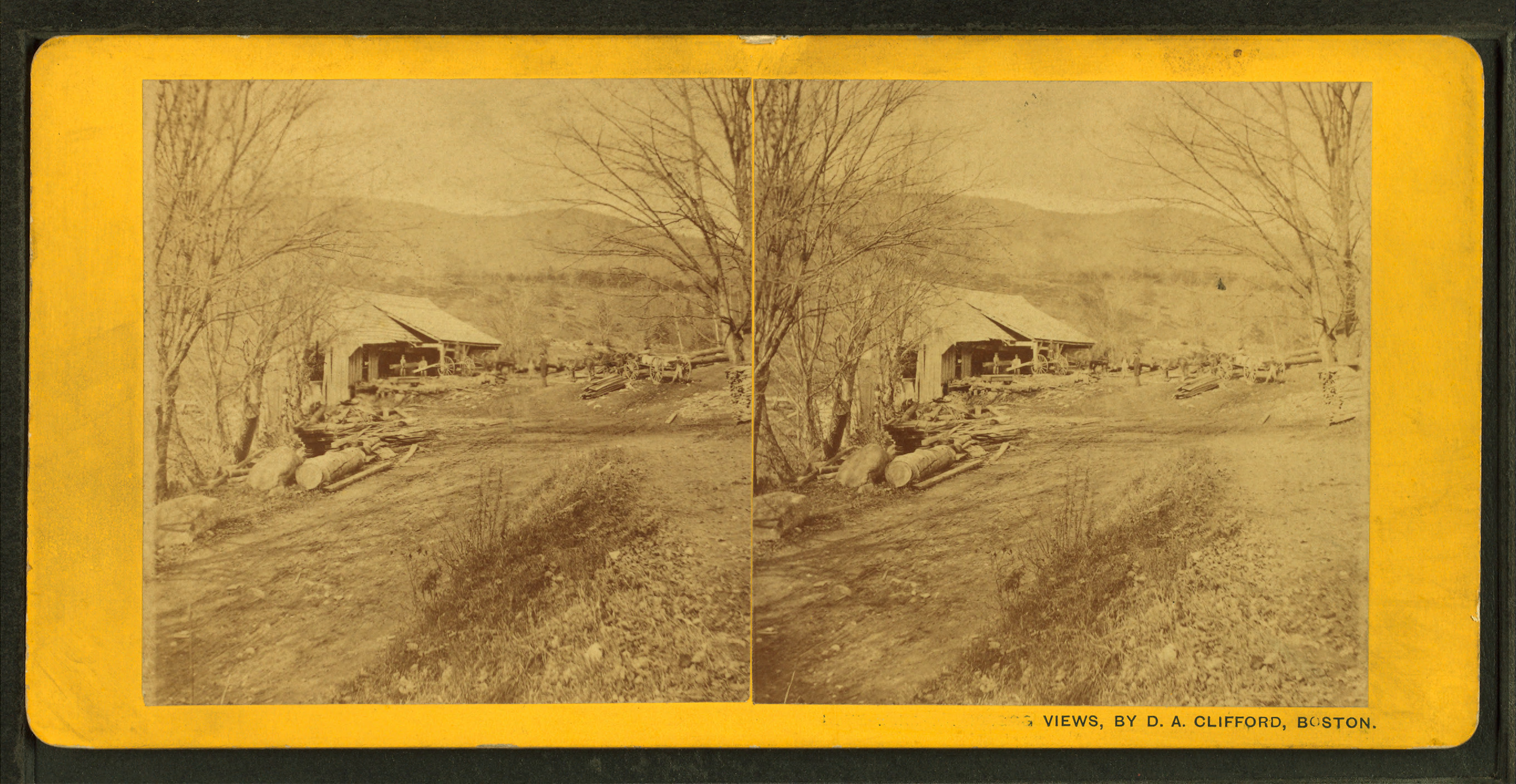
Sawmill

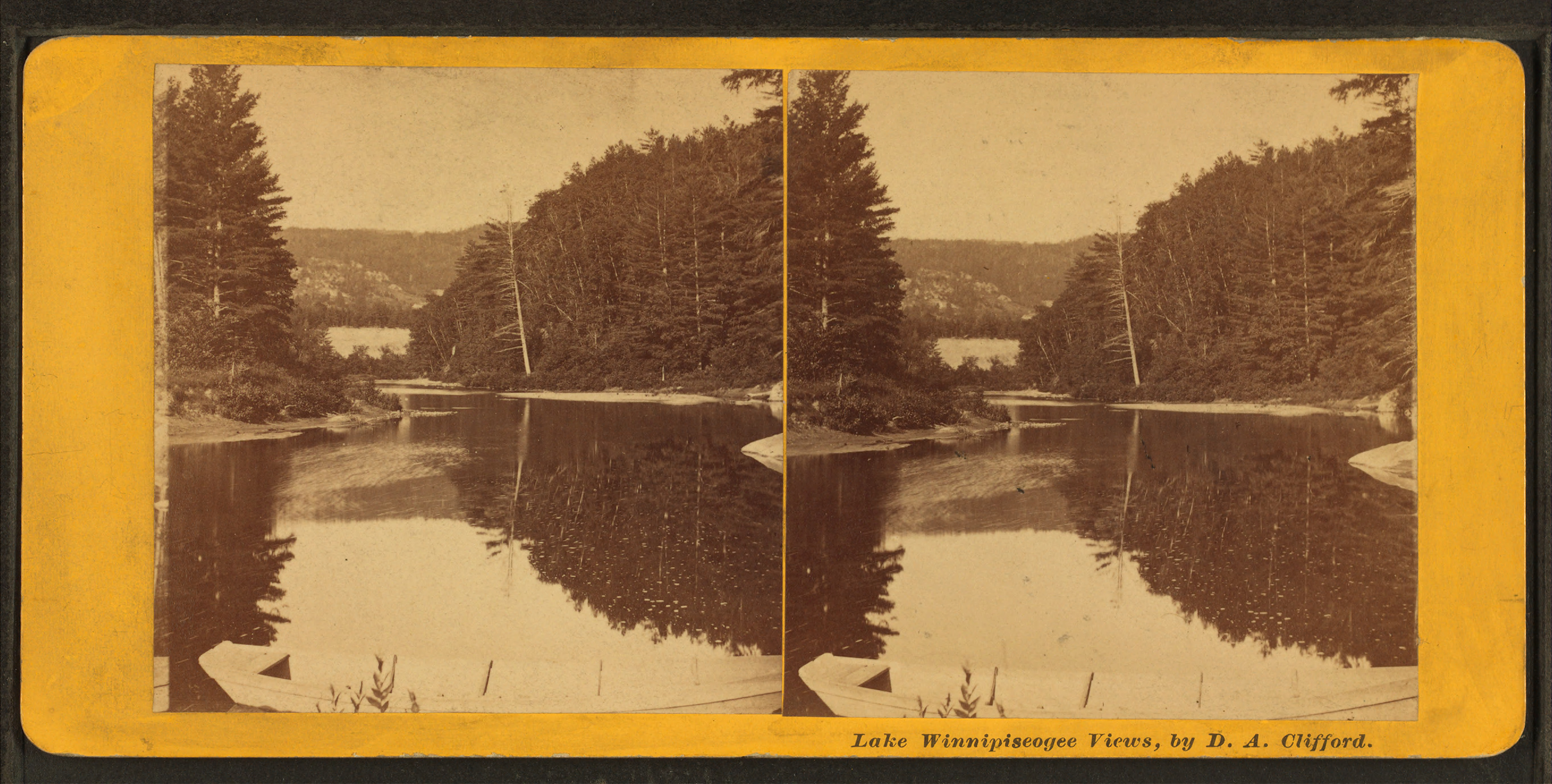
Baker River

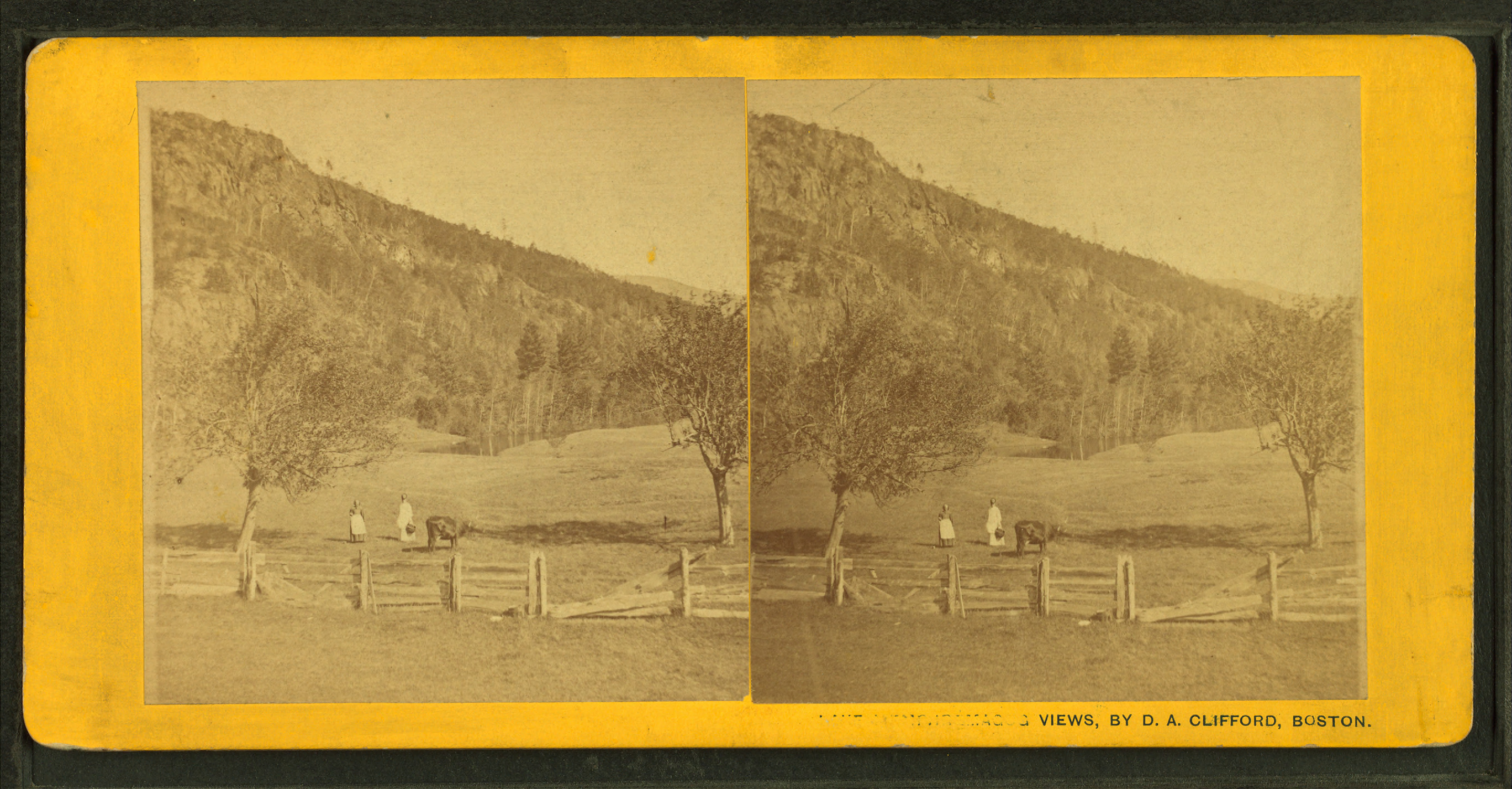
Rattlesnake Mountain

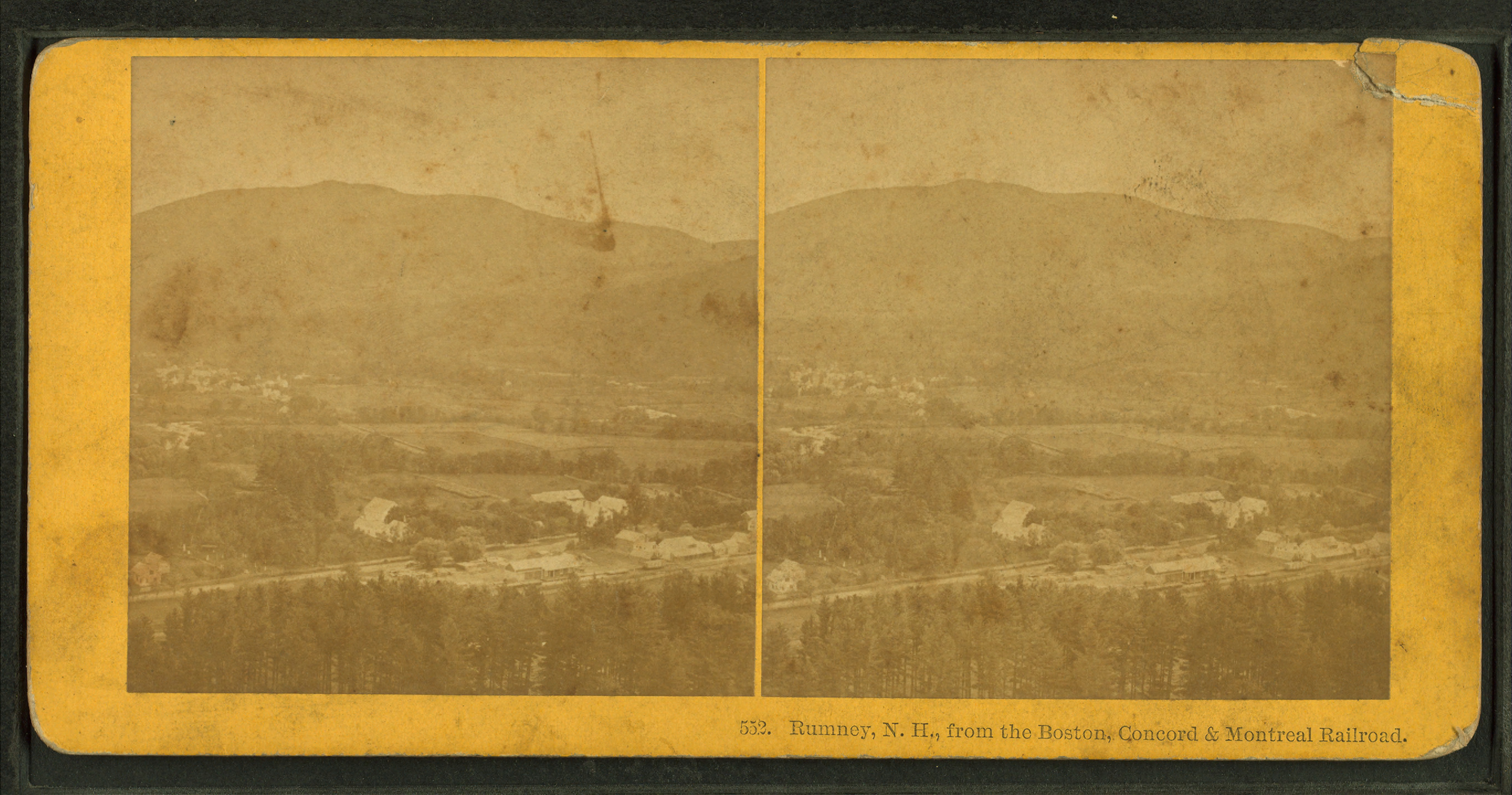
General view from train

== Notable people ==
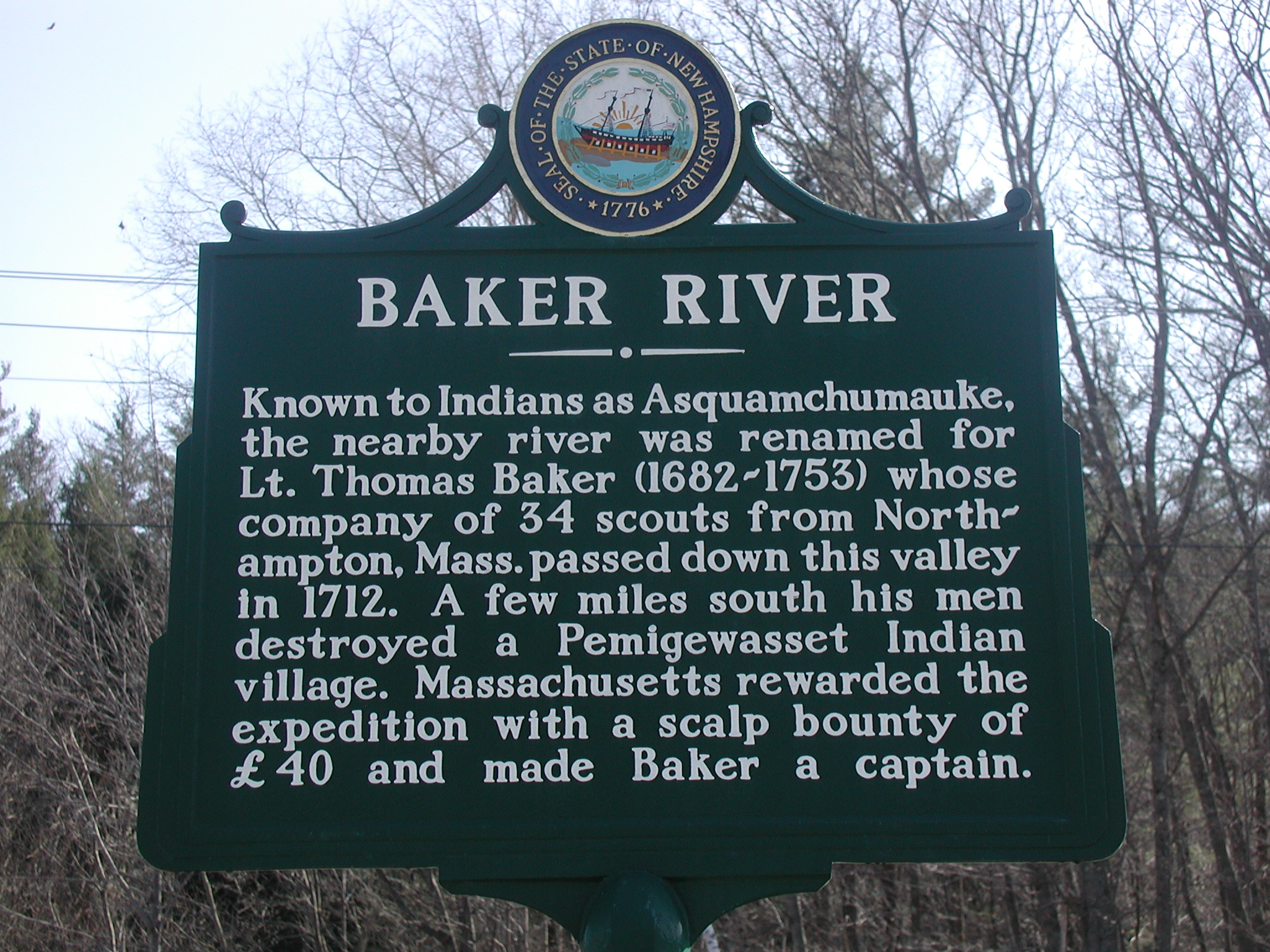
New Hampshire historical marker for the Baker River

- Robert Burns (1792–1866), US congressman
- Nathan Clifford (1803–1881), diplomat, 19th US Attorney General, and Associate Justice of the Supreme Court
- J. J. Donovan (1858–1937), Washington state businessman, politician
- Mary Baker Eddy (1821–1910), founder of Christian Science (1879)
- Thom Hartmann (born 1951), author, herbalist and pundit
- Jonathan Myles (born 1982), Olympic luger

== Sites of interest ==
- Mary Baker Eddy House
- Polar Caves Park
- Rumney Bible Conference

== See also ==
- New Hampshire Historical Marker No. 55: Baker River
- New Hampshire Historical Marker No. 174: Loveland Bridge
