= Nelson, New Hampshire =

- Town
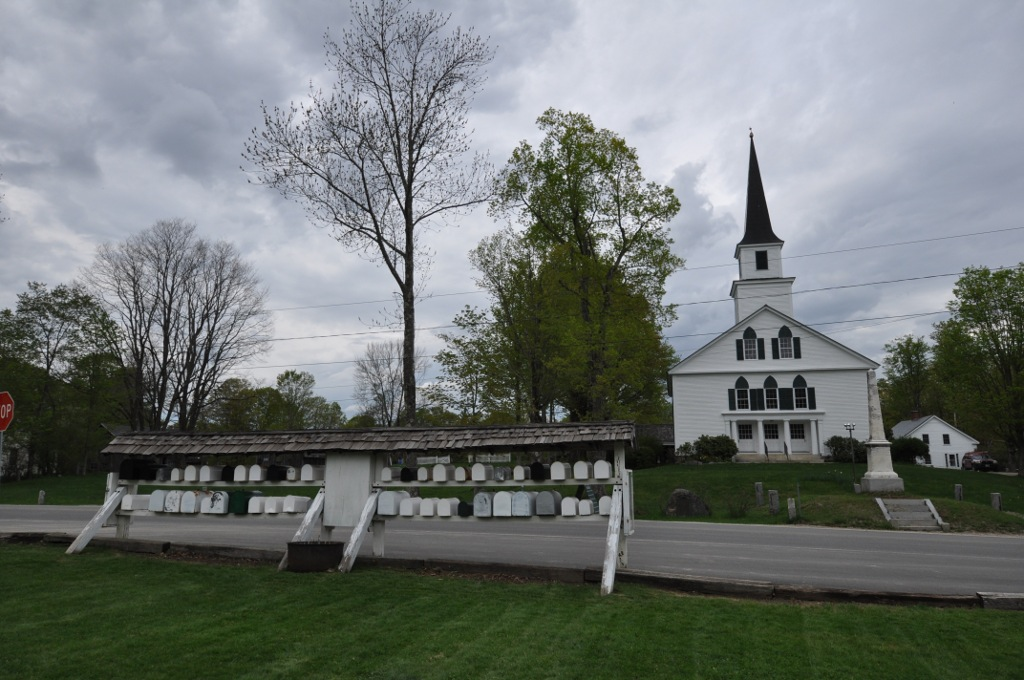
- Nelson Community Church and the town's iconic row of mailboxes

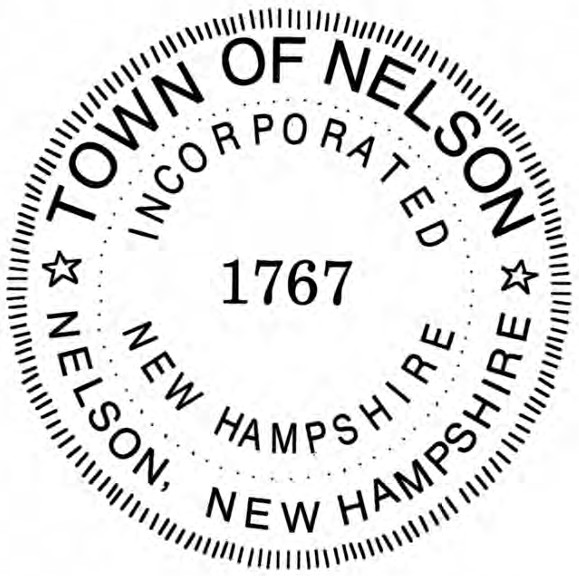
- Seal

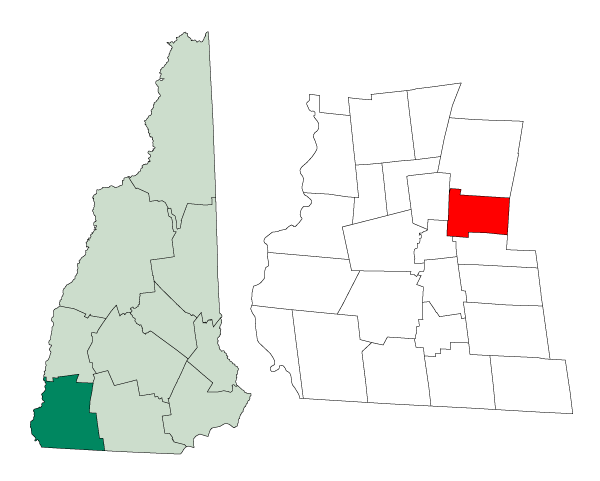
- Location in Cheshire County, New Hampshire
- Coordinates: 42°59′39″N 72°07′17″W
- Country: United States
- State: New Hampshire
- County: Cheshire
- Incorporated: 1774
- Villages: Nelson; Munsonville

Area
  - Total: 23.3 sq mi (60.3 km^{2})
  - Land: 21.9 sq mi (56.7 km^{2})
  - Water: 1.4 sq mi (3.5 km^{2}) 5.88%
- Elevation: 1,529 ft (466 m)

Population (2020)
  - Total: 629
  - Density: 29/sq mi (11.1/km^{2})
- Time zone: UTC-5 (Eastern)
  - Summer (DST): UTC-4 (Eastern)
- ZIP code: 03457
- Area code: 603
- FIPS code: 33-50580
- GNIS feature ID: 873673
- Website: www.townofnelson.org

Nelson is a town in Cheshire County, New Hampshire, United States. The population was 629 at the 2020 census, down from 729 at the 2010 census, and was an estimated 661 in 2025. Nelson includes the village of Munsonville.

== History ==
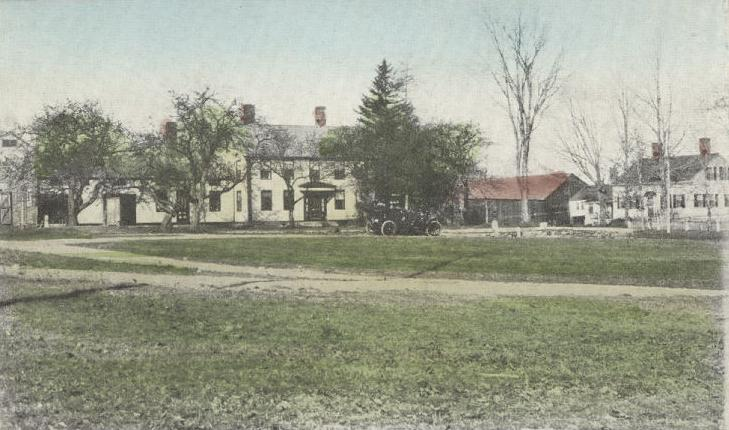
The Common c. 1914

Originally named "Monadnock No. 6", the town was granted in 1752 by Governor Benning Wentworth. It was first settled in 1767 by Breed Batchelder. On February 22, 1774, the town was incorporated by Governor John Wentworth as "Packersfield", after a major proprietor, Thomas Packer, the sheriff at Portsmouth, New Hampshire. The name was changed in 1814 to Nelson in honor of Viscount Horatio Nelson, British admiral and naval hero.

Located on the height of land separating the watersheds of the Connecticut and Merrimack rivers, Nelson became primarily an agricultural community. The uneven surface proved good for grazing. But with streams rising from four ponds to provide water power, it also developed industry. The village of Munsonville, situated on the stage line at the outlet of Granite Lake, manufactured cotton cloth and chairs. The L. J. Colony Chair Co. produced between 25,000 and 30,000 chairs annually, hiring women and children from local farms to weave the rattan seats and backs. At one time, Munsonville had 1,000 homesteads and 10 school districts. The mills have since closed, and Munsonville is today a resort of summer homes.

Nelson is the home of a popular Monday night contradance. Similar dances have been held for over 200 years in Nelson's town hall. Many claim this is the world's longest-running public contradance, though there have been no attempts to document this as an "official" record. The Apple Hill Center for Chamber Music, a classical chamber music group that attempts to bring members of cultures in conflict closer together through music, is also in Nelson.

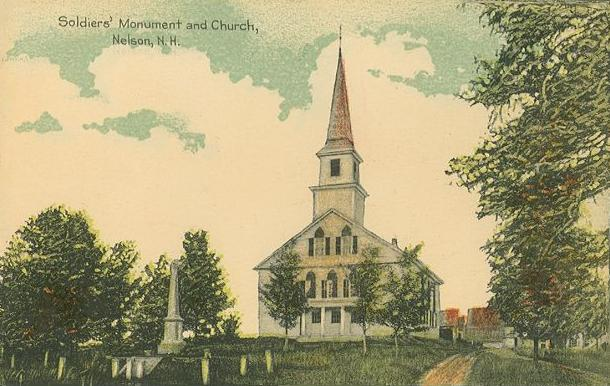
Soldiers' monument and church c. 1910

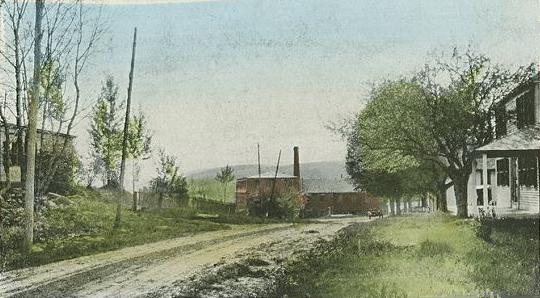
L. J. Colony Chair Co. at Munsonville c. 1914

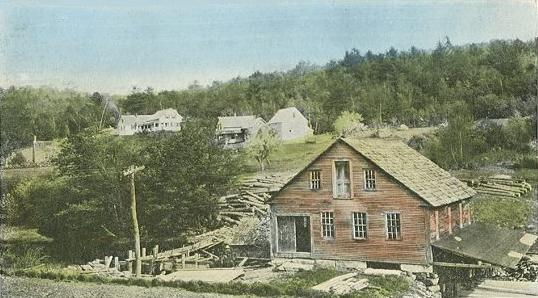
Old sawmill at Munsonville c. 1914

== Geography ==
Nelson is in the eastern part of Cheshire County, in southwestern New Hampshire. Its eastern border is the Hillsborough County line. According to the United States Census Bureau, the town has an area of 23.3 square miles (60.3 km^{2}), of which 21.9 square miles (56.7 km^{2}) are land and 1.4 square miles (3.5 km^{2}) are water, comprising 5.88% of the town. The eastern part of town drains towards the Contoocook River, a tributary of the Merrimack River and part of the Gulf of Maine watershed, while the western part feeds tributaries of the Ashuelot River, part of the Connecticut River watershed draining to Long Island Sound. Spoonwood Pond and part of Nubanusit Lake are in the east. Part of Silver Lake is in the south, and part of Granite Lake is in the north. The village of Munsonville is at the outlet of Granite Lake. The highest point in Nelson is the summit of Osgood Hill (also known as Nelson Pinnacle), with an elevation of 2,253 feet (687 m) above sea level.

The town is crossed by the Monadnock-Sunapee Greenway, a 50-mile-long (80 km) hiking trail that traverses the highlands of southern New Hampshire from Mount Monadnock in Jaffrey to Mount Sunapee in Newbury. The trail passes directly through the center of Nelson.

The town is crossed by New Hampshire Route 9.

=== Adjacent municipalities ===
- Stoddard (north)
- Antrim (northeast)
- Hancock (east)
- Harrisville (south)
- Roxbury (southwest)
- Sullivan (west)

== Demographics ==
Historical population
Census	Pop.	Note	%±
1790	721		—
1800	977		35.5%
1810	1,076		10.1%
1820	907		−15.7%
1830	875		−3.5%
1840	835		−4.6%
1850	750		−10.2%
1860	699		−6.8%
1870	744		6.4%
1880	438		−41.1%
1890	332		−24.2%
1900	295		−11.1%
1910	231		−21.7%
1920	171		−26.0%
1930	162		−5.3%
1940	282		74.1%
1950	231		−18.1%
1960	222		−3.9%
1970	304		36.9%
1980	442		45.4%
1990	535		21.0%
2000	634		18.5%
2010	729		15.0%
2020	629		−13.7%
2024 (est.)	667		6.0%
U.S. Decennial Census

As of the census of 2010, there were 729 people, 303 households, and 208 families residing in the town. The population density was 33.3 inhabitants per square mile (12.9/km^{2}). There were 460 housing units, of which 157, or 34.1%, were vacant. 144 of the vacant units were for seasonal or recreational use. The racial makeup of the town was 97.7% White, 0.0% African American, 0.0% Native American, 0.5% Asian, and 1.8% from two or more races. Hispanic or Latino of any race were 1.4% of the population.

Of the 303 households in the town, 26.4% had children under the age of 18 living with them, 52.8% were headed by married couples living together, 8.9% had a female householder with no husband present, and 31.4% were non-families. 24.8% of all households were made up of individuals, and 8.6% were someone living alone who was 65 years of age or older. The average household size was 2.41, and the average family size was 2.79.

19.1% of the town population were under the age of 18, 9.1% were from 18 to 24, 20.1% were from 25 to 44, 35.3% were from 45 to 64, and 16.3% were 65 years of age or older. The median age was 46.2 years. For every 100 females, there were 105.9 males. For every 100 females age 18 and over, there were 102.1 males.

For the period 2013–2017, the estimated median annual income for a household in the town was $71,500, and the median income for a family was $90,313. Male full-time workers had a median income of $48,000 versus $48,542 for females. The per capita income for the town was $38,514. About 12.4% of families and 13.2% of the population were below the poverty line, including 18.0% of those under age 18.

== Notable people ==
- Ursula Newell Emerson (1806–1888), missionary in Hawaii
- Alfred B. Kittredge (1861–1911), US senator from South Dakota
- Ralph Page (1903–1985), contra dance caller and authority on American folk dance
- May Sarton (1912–1995), poet, writer
