= Richard Potter =

Richard Potter may refer to:

- Richard Potter (businessman) (1817–1892), British businessman, chairman of the Great Western Railway company
- Richard Potter (magician) (1783–1835), American magician
- Richard Potter (British politician) (1778–1842), radical British Whig politician
- Richard Potter (Canadian politician) (1915–2009), Ontario MPP
- Rick Potter (born 1938), Canadian football player
- Dick Potter, tennis player, see Barry MacKay

== See also ==
- Richard Pottier (1906–1994), film director
