= List of disasters in New Hampshire by death toll =

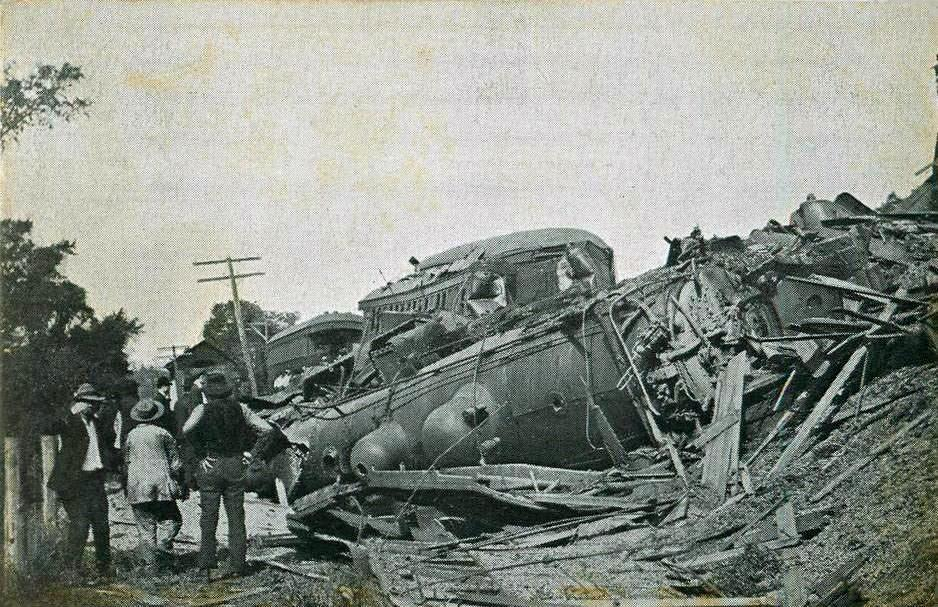
Aftermath of the Canaan train wreck (1907)

This is a list of known disasters that have occurred in New Hampshire, organized by death toll. Historically documented events that caused 10 or more deaths are included.

== List ==
Notes:

- Some of the events occurred prior to New Hampshire becoming a U.S. state.
- Acts of war are generally excluded, such as the French and Indian Wars, although specific localized events, such as the Raid on Oyster River, are included.
- Annual deaths from influenza ("flu season") are excluded unless they reached pandemic level per the New Hampshire Department of Health & Human Services (DHHS). Every flu season with a summary report available online from DHHS—currently 2012–2013 through 2019–2020—had at least 10 "influenza-associated" deaths in New Hampshire.
- Some of the events occurred in the Atlantic Ocean, at varying distances from land (such distances, when known, are provided via footnote).

Year (Note: For continuous multi-year events, the year in the year column represents the initial year of the event, unless otherwise noted.)	Event	Type	Death toll	Location	Sources
1918	Spanish flu pandemic	Disease	3,907	statewide	
2020	COVID-19 pandemic	Disease	2,972	statewide	
1694	Raid on Oyster River	Massacre	104	Durham	
1893	Strafford County Farm fire	Fire	41	Dover	
1941	Sinking of the USS O-9	Shipwreck	33	off Portsmouth (Note: Approximately 15 miles (24 km) off Portsmouth.)	
1968	Northeast Airlines Flight 946	Aviation accident	32	Etna	
1907	Canaan train wreck	Railway collision	26	Canaan	
1939	Sinking of the USS Squalus	Shipwreck	26	off Seabrook (Note: Approximately 10 miles (16 km) off Seabrook.)	
1689	Raid on Dover	Massacre	23	Dover	
1689	Raid on Huckins' Garrison	Massacre	18	Durham	
1689	Raid on Sandy Beach	Massacre	16	Rye	
1696	Raid on Portsmouth Plain (Note: See also New Hampshire historical marker 75 in Portsmouth.)	Massacre	14	Portsmouth	
1881	Strafford County Farm fire	Fire	13	Dover	
1938	1938 New England hurricane	Weather	13	statewide	
1944	Army Air Force B-24 crash	Aviation accident	10	Epsom	

=== Disasters with incomplete information ===
The New Hampshire death tolls for these regional events, which are known to have caused 10 or more deaths in the neighboring state of Massachusetts, are currently lacking.

- 1896 Eastern North America heat wave – caused the deaths of at least four people in Nashua, and about 1,500 people in total
- 1911 Eastern North America heat wave – caused the deaths of 380 to 2000 people in total

=== Disasters not included ===
These notable events are not included in the main list, but have some association with New Hampshire.

- In April 1963, the USS Thresher (SSN-593) departed from Portsmouth Naval Shipyard in Kittery, Maine, (Note: Whether the island that the Portsmouth Naval Shipyard is located on lies within Maine or New Hampshire has been a point of contention between the states; see Piscataqua River border dispute.) and sank off the coast of Cape Cod, Massachusetts, resulting in the loss of 129 lives.
- In July 1973, Delta Air Lines Flight 723 crashed while attempting to land at Logan International Airport in Boston, resulting in 89 fatalities; the flight originated in Burlington, Vermont, and made an intermediate stop in Manchester before the incident.

=== Disasters at notable locations ===
These events at notable New Hampshire locations had multiple fatalities, although fewer than 10, thus are not included in the main list.

- In August 1826, a landslide near Willey House at Crawford Notch in the White Mountains resulted in nine deaths.
- In September 1967, eight passengers were killed and 72 injured after a locomotive of the Mount Washington Cog Railway derailed and a passenger car slid several hundred feet into a large rock.

== See also ==
- List of accidents and disasters by death toll
- List of natural disasters by death toll
- List of disasters in Maine by death toll
- List of disasters in Massachusetts by death toll
- List of disasters in the United States by death toll
