= Potter Place Railroad Station =

- U.S. National Register of Historic Places
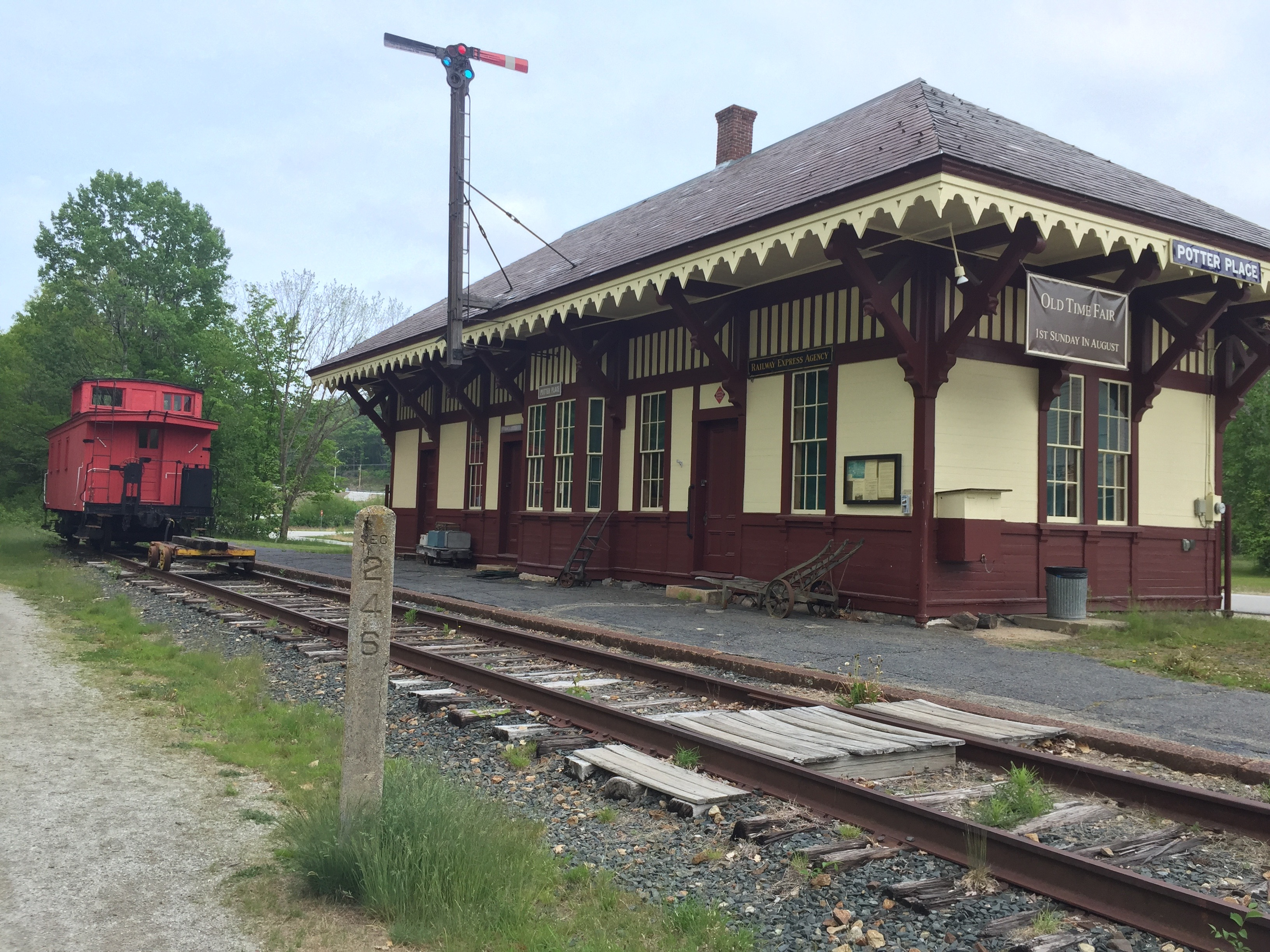

- Location within New Hampshire Location within the United States
- Location: Depot St., Andover, New Hampshire
- Coordinates: 43.43653°N 71.85586°W
- Area: 0.2 acres (0.081 ha)
- Built: 1874
- Architect: Cheney, John B.
- Architectural style: Stick/Eastlake
- NRHP reference No.: 89000189
- Added to NRHP: March 16, 1989

The Potter Place Railroad Station is a historic railroad station on Depot Street in Andover, New Hampshire. Built in 1874, it is one of the best-preserved surviving 19th-century railroad stations in Merrimack County. It now houses the museum of the Andover Historical Society. It was listed on the National Register of Historic Places in 1989.

== Description and history ==
The Potter Place Railroad Station is located in what is now a relatively rural setting, between Depot Street and the former railroad right-of-way of the Boston and Maine Railroad, now used for the Northern Rail Trail. Depot Street is in part a historical alignment of the main east–west road through Andover, now bypassed by U.S. Route 4. The building is a single-story wood-frame structure, with a hip roof. The roof has long eaves, which are supported by large decoratively carved brackets and feature ornamental carving at the eave. The street-facing roof face is pierced by two gabled dormers. The walls are finished in vertical board siding, with applied Stick style elements, especially in the upper sections. On the track-facing facade is a projecting bay, through which run controls for a working semaphore signal.

The Northern Railroad was a line run between Concord, New Hampshire, and White River Junction, Vermont, beginning in 1847. This station was built to serve that line in 1874. At the time of its National Register listing, it was one of fourteen surviving railroad stations in Merrimack County, of which most had been substantially altered. This station, sold by the railroad in 1961, underwent a careful restoration in the 1970s, and was taken over by the Andover Historical Society in 1983.

== Andover Historical Society Museum ==
The station is the primary museum building of the Andover Historical Society, and features an early to mid 20th century period station master's office. An early 20th century caboose is located next to the station.

The Society's other museum buildings include an early 20th-century railroad freight house displaying agricultural machinery and ice harvesting tools, a restored turn-of-the-20th-century village store, an early 20th-century post office, and the Tucker Mountain Schoolhouse. The Society's museum buildings are open on summer weekends.

The homestead site and grave of magician Richard Potter and his wife are located across the railroad right-of-way from the station.

== See also ==
- National Register of Historic Places listings in Merrimack County, New Hampshire
- New Hampshire Historical Marker No. 54: Potter Place
