= East Andover, New Hampshire =

Unincorporated community in New Hampshire, United States

- Unincorporated community
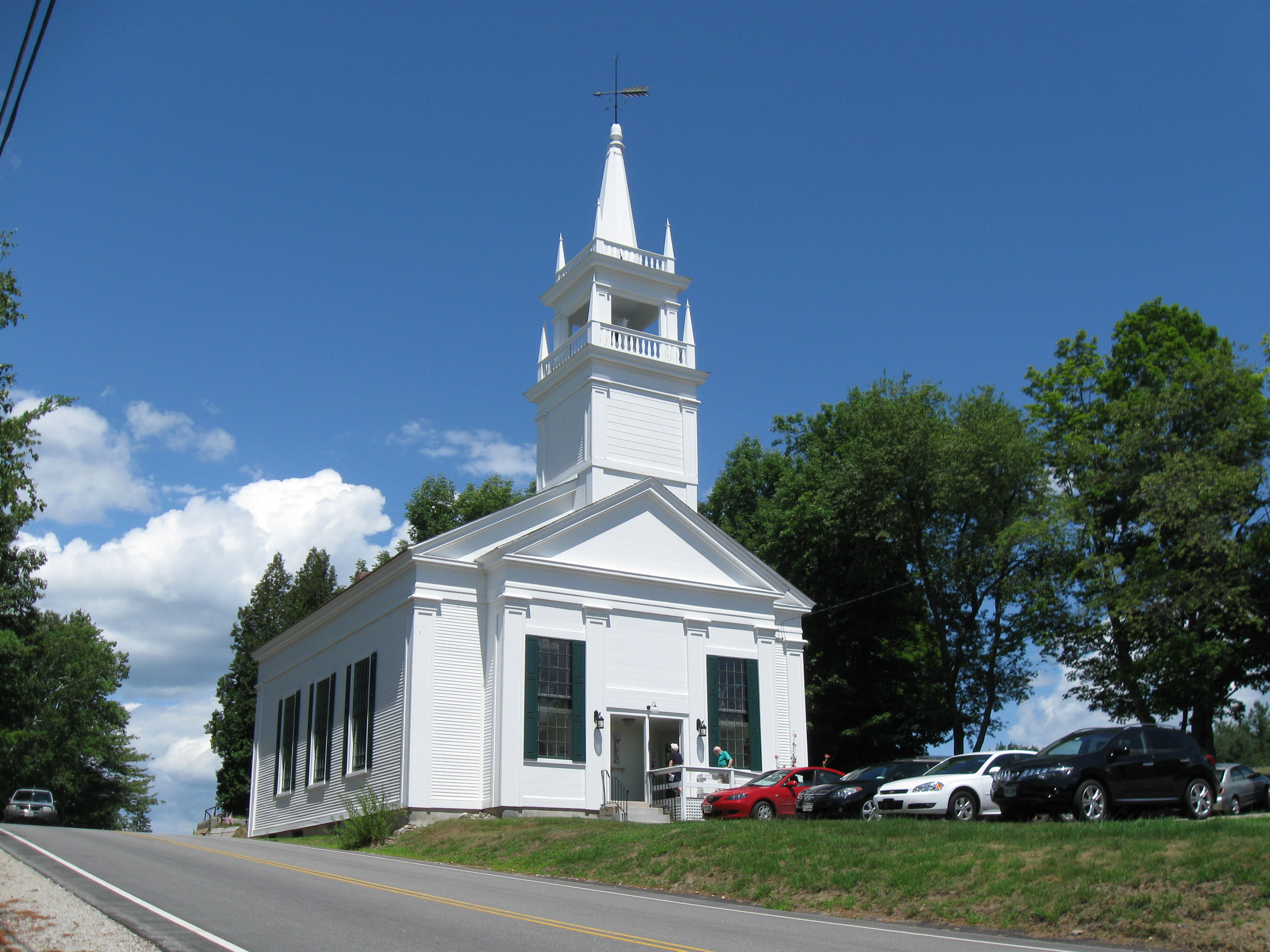
- Andover Congregational Church in the village of East Andover

- Location within New Hampshire Location within the United States
- Coordinates: 43°27′33″N 71°44′53″W
- Country: United States
- State: New Hampshire
- County: Merrimack
- Town: Andover
- Elevation: 673 ft (205 m)
- Time zone: UTC-5 (Eastern (EST))
  - Summer (DST): UTC-4 (EDT)
- ZIP code: 03231
- Area code: 603
- GNIS feature ID: 866685

East Andover is an unincorporated community in the town of Andover in Merrimack County, New Hampshire, United States. The center of the community forms the East Andover Village Center Historic District.

The village is located on the east shore of Highland Lake, along New Hampshire Route 11 in the eastern portion of Andover. Route 11 runs east to Franklin and New Hampshire's Lakes Region, and runs west to the rest of Andover and the Lake Sunapee region. The village was a station along the former Northern Railroad connecting Concord to the southeast with White River Junction, Vermont to the northwest. The railroad grade is now the route of the Northern Rail Trail, currently extending from Penacook in the east to Lebanon in the west.

East Andover has a separate ZIP code (03231) from the rest of the town of Andover.
