= List of New Hampshire historical markers (51–75) =

- «26–50 76–100»

This page is one of a series of pages that list New Hampshire historical markers. The text of each marker is provided within its entry.

Contents
No.	Title	Location	Coordinates
51	Dr. Jeremy Belknap (1744–1798)	Dover	43.13597°N 70.84067°W
52	Stoddard Glass	Stoddard	43.05273°N 72.07789°W
53	Wentworth Estate	Wolfeboro	43.61256°N 71.1479°W
54	Potter Place	Andover	43.43849°N 71.85415°W
55	Baker River	Rumney	43.80316°N 71.85622°W
56	Rogers Rangers	Haverhill	44.12796°N 72.03288°W
57	Union Church	Claremont	43.38647°N 72.38901°W
58	Scotch-Irish Settlement	Derry	42.89411°N 71.29493°W
59	Hosea Ballou (1771–1852)	Richmond	42.78017°N 72.27202°W
60	First Methodist Meeting Place in New Hampshire	Chesterfield	42.90175°N 72.47764°W
61	First Connecticut River Bridge	Walpole	43.1285°N 72.4373°W
62	Breakfast Hill	North Hampton	43.0013°N 70.81102°W
63	Atlantic Cable Station and Sunken Forest	Rye	42.99321°N 70.75922°W
64	45th Parallel	Stewartstown	45°N 71.52645°W
65	Pierce Homestead	Hillsborough	43.14672°N 71.93575°W
66	State Capitol	Concord	43.20746°N 71.53696°W
67	Bridges House – Governor's Residence	Concord	43.23884°N 71.53692°W
68	Toll House and Toll Gate	Sharon	42.79689°N 71.97049°W
69	Keene Glass Industry	Keene	42.94296°N 72.27525°W
70	Old Coal Kiln	Lisbon	44.24899°N 71.85538°W
71	Kilburn Brothers Stereoscopic View Factory	Littleton	44.30324°N 71.7697°W
72	Mystery Hill	Salem	42.80269°N 71.24252°W
73	First Ski School in America	Sugar Hill	44.22559°N 71.76881°W
74	Park Hill Meeting House	Westmoreland	42.9739°N 72.45711°W
75	Portsmouth Plains	Portsmouth	43.05772°N 70.78376°W
Notes • References • External links

== Markers 51 to 75 ==
=== 51. Dr. Jeremy Belknap (1744–1798) ===
City of Dover

"Noted preacher, educator, naturalist and historian. Born Boston, Mass. Harvard College 1762. School teacher at Portsmouth and Greenland. Pastor of First Congregational Church at nearby Dover, 1766-1786. Published first History of New Hampshire. Founded Massachusetts Historical Society, 1794. A New Hampshire county perpetuates his name."

Note: this marker was erected in 1968.

=== 52. Stoddard Glass ===
Town of Stoddard

"Glassmaking in this town covered the years 1842-1873. Nearby stood the South Stoddard Glass Works founded by Joseph Foster in 1842. A second works was erected in 1846 at Mill Village two miles north. In its day a major industry of the State, Stoddard glass products are now highly prized by collectors."

=== 53. Wentworth Estate ===
Town of Wolfeboro

"This marker stands on the northwesterly part of a 4,000-acre tract which comprised the elegant country estate of John Wentworth, last royal governor of New Hampshire (1767–1775). The manor house, erected in 1769 on the northeast shore of this Lake, was the earliest summer home in the Lakes Region. It was destroyed by fire in 1820."

Note: this marker was erected in 1968.

=== 54. Potter Place ===
Town of Andover

"The community takes its name from Richard Potter, noted magician, ventriloquist and showman. This 19th century master of the Black Arts was known throughout America. He died here in 1835 in his mansion, a showplace in the town. He is buried in a small plot on his once extensive estate." (Note: Potter and his wife are buried near the Potter Place Railroad Station.)

Note: this marker was erected in 1968.

=== 55. Baker River ===
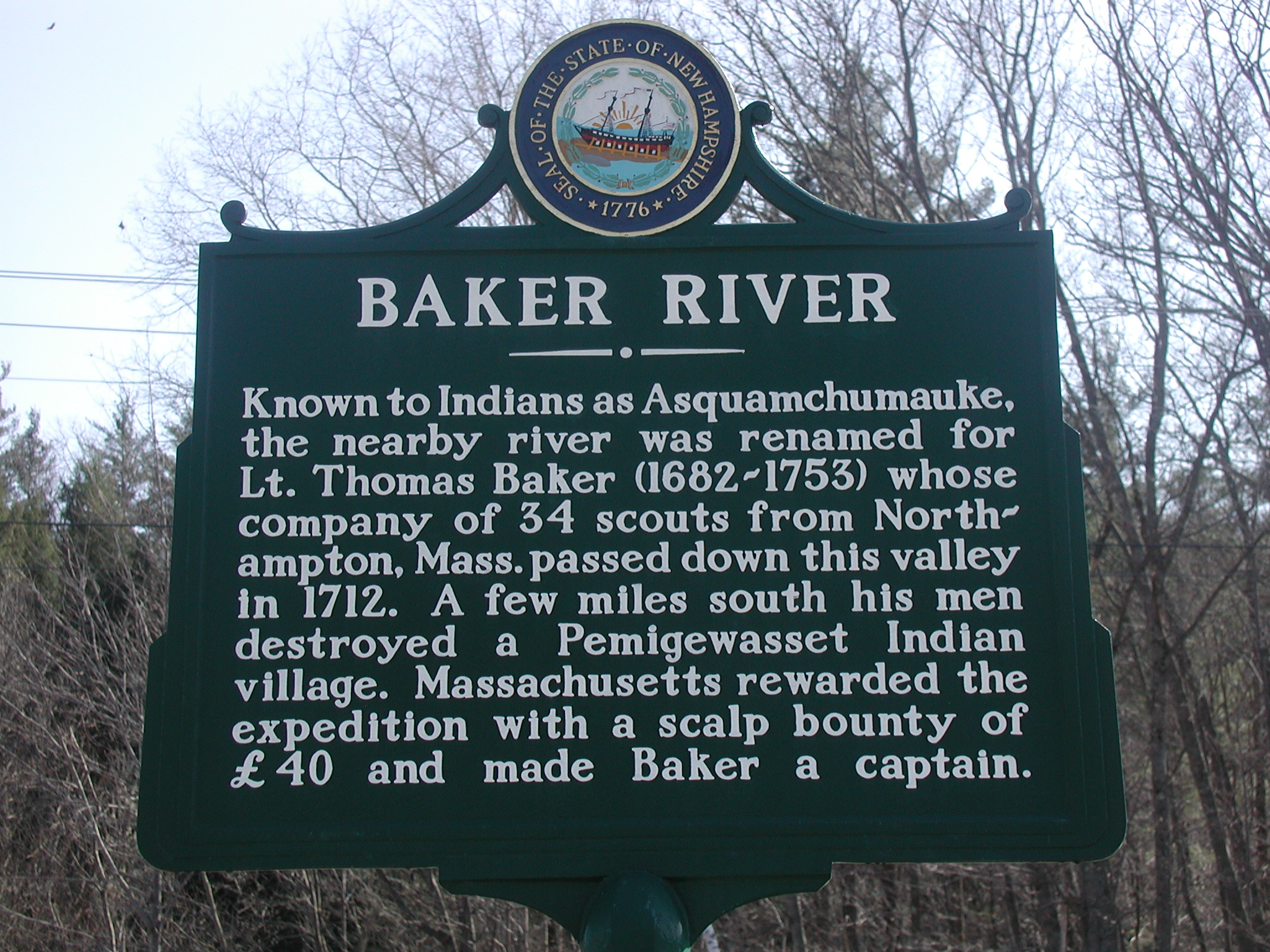
Historical marker for the Baker River

Town of Rumney

"Known to Indians as Asquamchumauke, the nearby river was renamed for Lt. Thomas Baker (1682–1753) whose company of 34 scouts from Northampton, Mass. passed down this valley in 1712. A few miles south his men destroyed a Pemigewasset Indian village. Massachusetts rewarded the expedition with a scalp bounty of £40 and made Baker a captain."

Note: As of March 2022, this marker was listed as "Retired".

=== 56. Rogers Rangers ===
Town of Haverhill

"This rivers' junction two miles north was rendezvous for Rogers Rangers after their destruction of St. Francis, Que., Oct. 4, 1759. Pursuing Indians and starvation had plagued their retreat and more tragedy awaited here. The expected rescue party bringing food had come and gone. Many Rangers perished and early settlers found their bones along these intervales."

Note: this marker was erected in 1968.

=== 57. Union Church ===
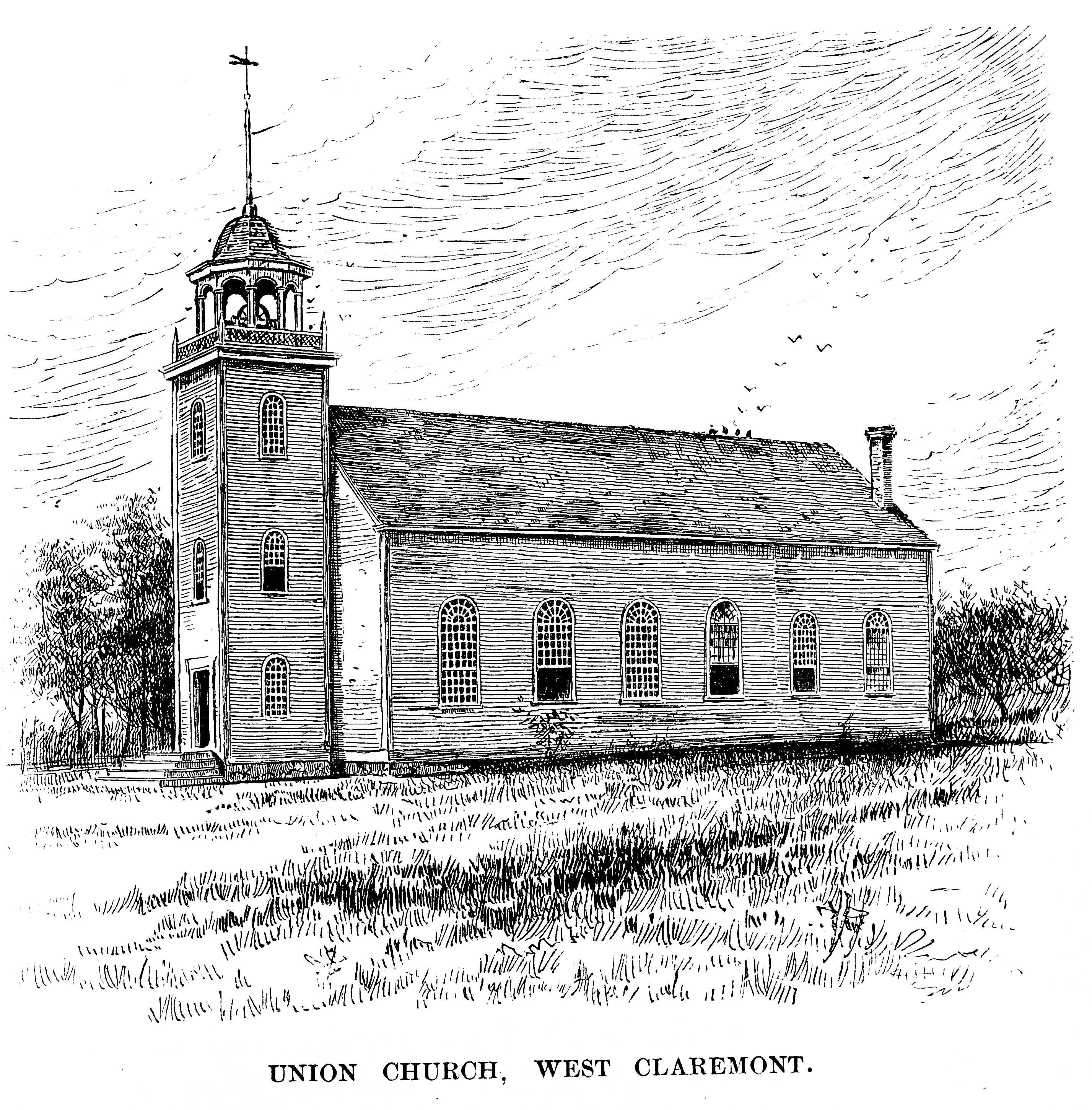
An 1885 engraving of Union Church

City of Claremont

"Located easterly on Old Church Road, this wood-frame structure, built in 1771-1773, is the oldest standing Episcopal church in the State, serving the second oldest parish. The parish began in 1768 as a mission of the Society for the Propagation of the Gospel in Foreign Parts. The first rector was Reverend Ranna Cossitt (1773–1785)."

Note: since July 2024, this marker has been listed as "Out for Repair".

=== 58. Scotch-Irish Settlement ===
Town of Derry

"In April 1719, sixteen Presbyterian Scotch-Irish families settled here in two rows of cabins along West Running Brook easterly of Beaver Brook. Initially known as Nutfield, the settlement became Londonderry in 1723. The first year, a field was planted, known as the Common Field, where the potato was first grown in North America."

Note: this marker was erected in 1969.

=== 59. Hosea Ballou (1771–1852) ===
Town of Richmond

"Born in an almost uncleared wilderness in an area then known as Ballou's Dell, 1.5 miles east of here, on Fish Hatchery Road, this farm boy, raised in the Baptist faith, became known as the Father of Universalism. In the 19th century, as an author and preacher, he expounded religious liberalism from pulpits in Portsmouth, N.H., Salem and Boston, Mass."

Note: this marker was erected in 1969.

=== 60. First Methodist Meeting Place in New Hampshire ===
Town of Chesterfield

"In 1772, 'the people called Methodist' held their first religious meeting in this state on the James Robertson farm, 1.2 miles north of here, on Christian Street, with Philip Embury as the preacher. On June 20, 1803, Francis Asbury spoke here using as his text: 'Let us run with patience the race that is set before us.'"

=== 61. First Connecticut River Bridge ===
Town of Walpole

"The first bridge across this river was built 1/4 mile north of this location in 1785 by Col. Enoch Hale. This toll bridge, replaced in 1840, was recognized in the 18th century as one of America's outstanding bridges because of its unique engineering style. Its replacement was made a free bridge in 1904." (Note: The Vilas Bridge now crosses the river in this location.)

Note: this marker was erected in 1970.

=== 62. Breakfast Hill ===
Town of North Hampton

"On the hillside to be seen to the north of this location a band of marauding Indians and their captives were found eating their breakfast on June 26, 1696, following the attack at the Portsmouth Plains. When confronted by the militia the Indians made a hasty exit leaving the prisoners and plunder. This locality still enjoys the name of Breakfast Hill."

=== 63. Atlantic Cable Station and Sunken Forest ===
Town of Rye

"The receiving station for the first Atlantic Cable, laid in 1874, (Note: The first transatlantic telegraph cable was laid in the 1850s, between Ireland and Canada, and was briefly operational in 1858. There has been a permanent cable connection between Europe and North American since 1866. A later cable, laid in 1874 by the CS Faraday, terminated in Rye. As described in 1899, "The cable goes from Rye Beach to Halifax, N. S., and is there connected to the cable from Halifax to Ballinskelligs Bay, on the coast of Ireland.") is located on Old Beach Road opposite this location. (Note: The Cable House, now a private residence, is still extant at 20 Old Beach Road.) The remains of the Sunken Forest (remnants of the Ice Age) may be seen at low tide. Intermingled with these gnarled stumps is the original Atlantic Cable."

Note: this marker was erected in 1970.

=== 64. 45th Parallel ===
Marker for 45th parallel north in Stewartstown

Town of Stewartstown

"As you stand at this point on the 45th parallel you are half way between the Equator and the North Pole."

=== 65. Pierce Homestead ===
Town of Hillsborough

"The Pierce Homestead was built in 1804 by Benjamin Pierce, a general in the American Revolution, twice governor of New Hampshire (1827-28, 1829-30), and father of Franklin Pierce, the 14th President of the United States (1853–1857). Franklin Pierce was born in Hillsboro November 23, 1804 and the family occupied this dwelling shortly thereafter."

=== 66. State Capitol ===
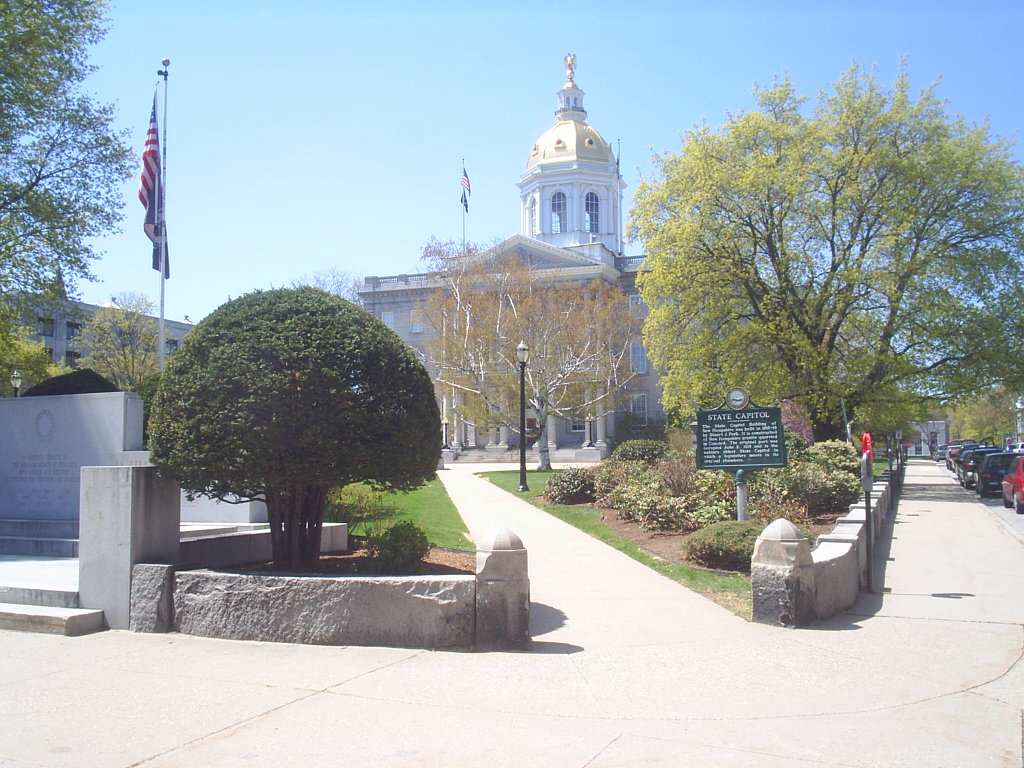
Historical marker on the grounds of the New Hampshire State House

City of Concord

"The State Capitol Building of New Hampshire was built in 1816 to 1819 by Stuart J. Park. It is constructed of New Hampshire granite quarried in Concord. The original part was occupied June 2, 1819 and is the nation's oldest State Capitol in which a legislature meets in its original chambers."

=== 67. Bridges House – Governor's Residence ===
City of Concord

"This house, on land long occupied by Revolutionary Veteran Joshua Thompson, was built by Charles Graham about 1836. Styles Bridges, Governor of New Hampshire (1935-36) and U.S. Senator for 25 years thereafter, lived here from 1946 until his death. Left to the State upon the death of his widow, it became in 1969 the Governor's official residence."

Note: this marker was erected in 1970.

=== 68. Toll House and Toll Gate ===
Town of Sharon

"A Toll House and Toll Gate stood on this site from 1803 to 1822. For many years droves of cattle passed along this 3rd New Hampshire Turnpike (Note: See also List of turnpikes in New Hampshire.) (Incorporated in 1799) four rods wide running from Walpole through Keene and Sharon toward Boston to the Massachusetts line."

=== 69. Keene Glass Industry ===
City of Keene

"The first of two famous Keene glass factories was established near this site in 1814 and produced window glass for the New England area until 1853. Another glass works (1815–1842), 1.5 miles southeast of here on Marlboro Street, made bottles and flasks now known as 'Keene Glass' and prized today by museums and collectors."

=== 70. Old Coal Kiln ===
Town of Lisbon

"A reminder of bygone days, this stone structure was used to make wood into charcoal for the nearby iron smelters. Pine knots, a waste material from the adjacent lumber mill, were a prime source for charcoal. Charcoal production through this kiln, built in the 1860s, was necessary to the iron mining industry."

=== 71. Kilburn Brothers Stereoscopic View Factory ===
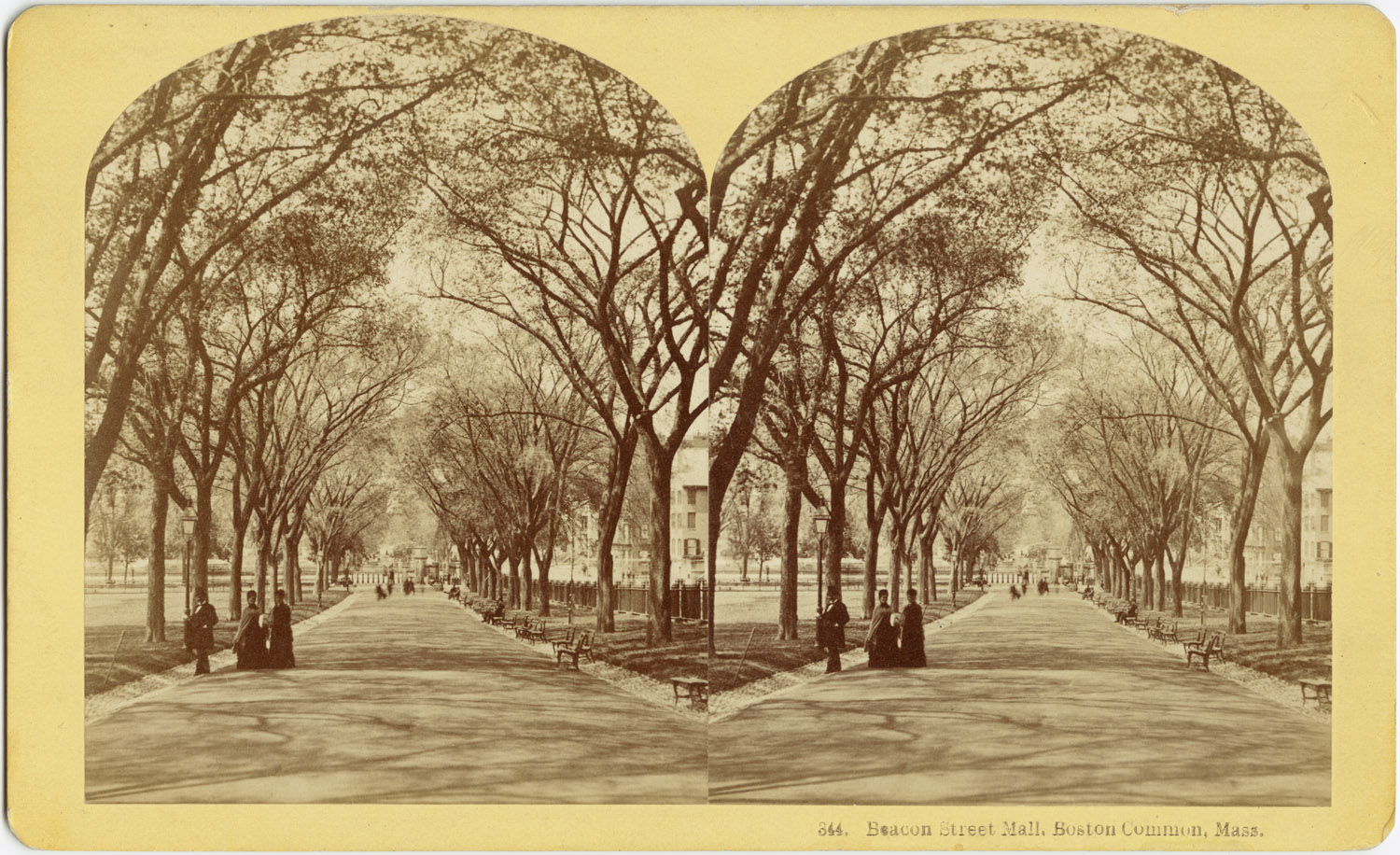
Stereograph of Boston Common by Benjamin W. Kilburn

Town of Littleton

"Here, from 1867 to 1909, the world famous Kilburn brothers, Benjamin and Edward, produced and distributed thousands of stereoscopic views. Their collection, largest in the world and collector's items today, provided popular parlor entertainment for generations."

=== 72. Mystery Hill ===
Town of Salem

"Four miles east on Route 111 is a privately owned complex of strange stone structures bearing similarities to early stone work found in western Europe. They suggest an ancient culture may have existed here more than 2,000 years ago. Sometimes called 'America's Stonehenge', these intriguing chambers hold a fascinating story and could be remnants of a pre-Viking or even Phoenician civilization."

Note: this marker was erected in 1970.

=== 73. First Ski School in America ===
Town of Sugar Hill

"In 1929, on the slopes of the hill to the east, Austrian-born Sig Buchmayr established the first organized ski school in the United States. Sponsored by Peckett's-on-Sugar Hill, one of the earliest resorts to promote the joys of winter vacationing in the snow, the school provided an initial impetus to the ski sport America knows today."

=== 74. Park Hill Meeting House ===
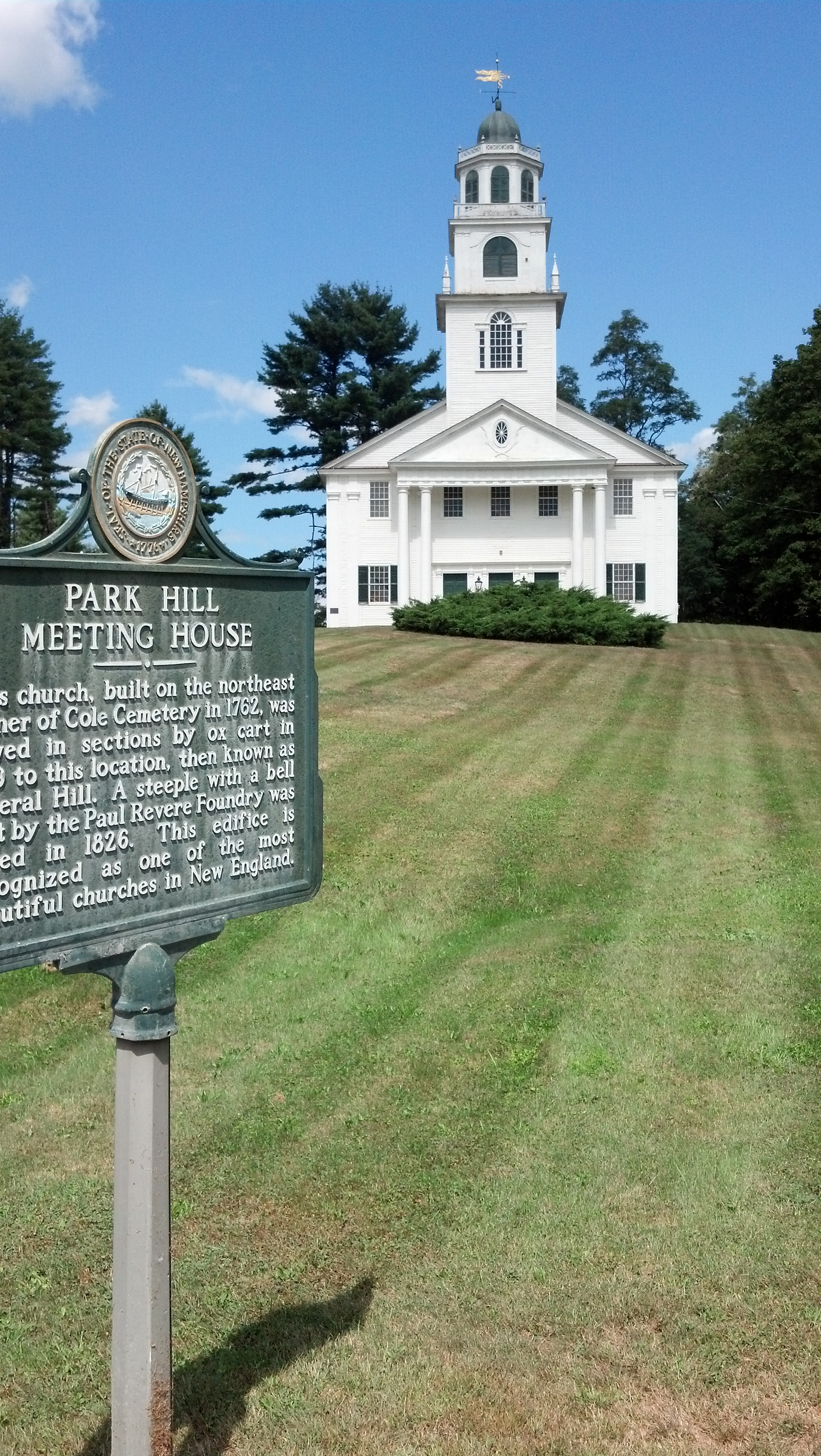
Park Hill Meetinghouse

Town of Westmoreland

"This church, built on the northeast corner of Cole Cemetery in 1762, was moved in sections by ox cart in 1779 to this location, then known as Federal Hill. A steeple with a bell cast by the Paul Revere Foundry was added in 1826. This edifice is recognized as one of the most beautiful churches in New England."

=== 75. Portsmouth Plains ===
City of Portsmouth

"In the pre-dawn hours of June 26, 1696, Indians attacked the settlement here. Fourteen persons were killed and others taken captive. Five houses and nine barns were burned. This plain was the Training Field and Muster Ground. Close by stood the famous Plains Tavern (1728–1914) with its Bowling Green where many distinguished visitors were entertained."
