= Park Hill Meetinghouse =

Historic church in New Hampshire, United States

- U.S. National Register of Historic Places
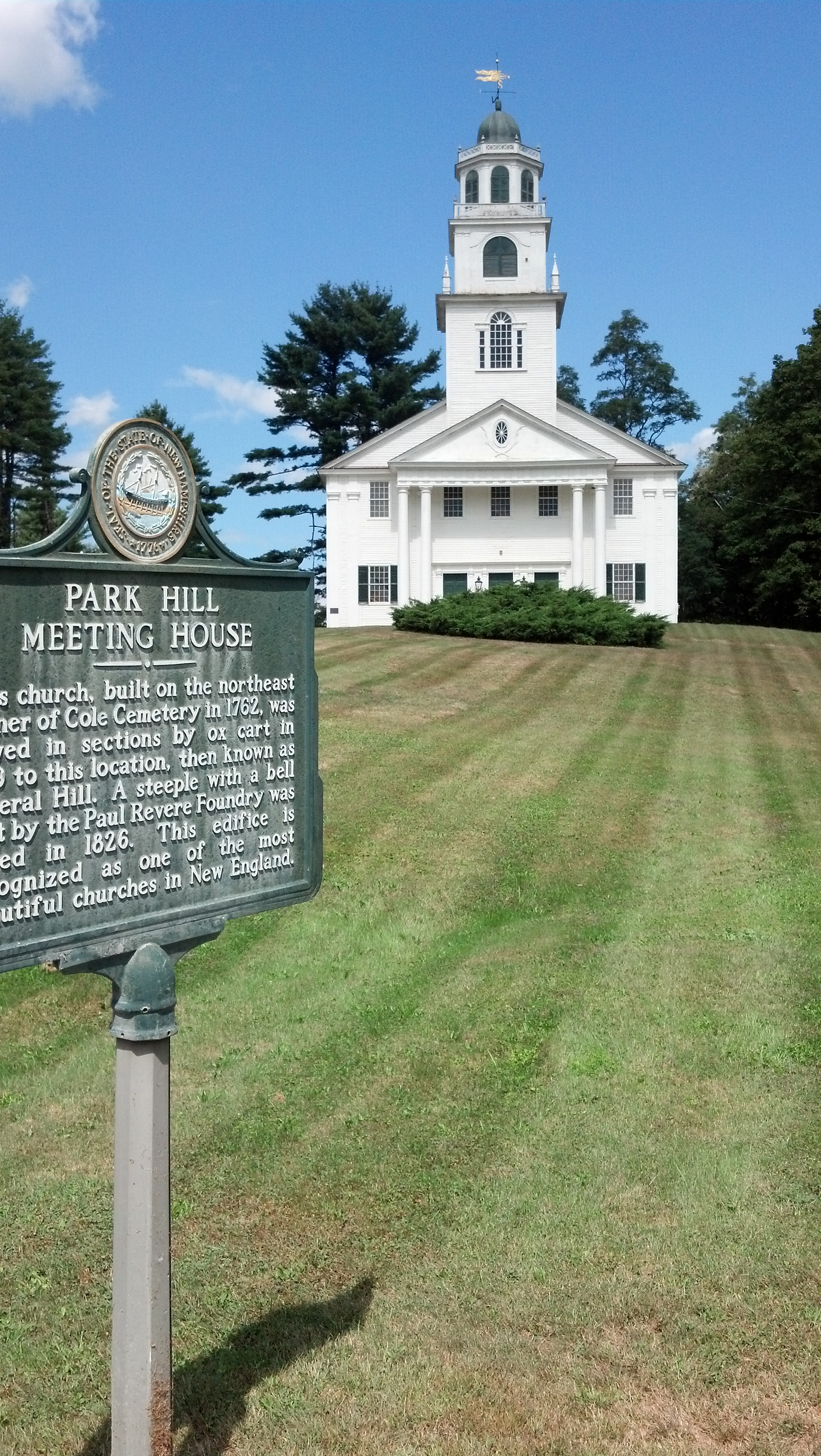
- Park Hill Meetinghouse with New Hampshire Historical Marker No. 74 in the foreground

- Location within New Hampshire Location within the United States
- Location: Park Hill, Westmoreland, New Hampshire
- Coordinates: 42°58′31″N 72°27′24″W
- Area: 2 acres (0.81 ha)
- Built: 1764
- Architectural style: Federal, Greek Revival
- NRHP reference No.: 80000278
- Added to NRHP: September 8, 1980

The Park Hill Meetinghouse is a historic meeting house on Park Hill in Westmoreland, New Hampshire. Built in 1764, and extensively restyled in the early 19th century, it is a fine example of Federal and Greek Revival architecture, influenced by the work of regionally prominent architect Elias Carter. The building was listed on the National Register of Historic Places in 1980. It is now owned by the Westmoreland Park Hill Meetinghouse and Historical Society.

== Description and history ==
The Park Hill Meetinghouse is located in the Park Hill village north of Westmoreland's village center, on the east side of New Hampshire Route 63. It is a two-story wood-frame structure, with a gabled roof and clapboarded exterior. It has a broad five-bay facade, with paired pilasters at the corners and three entrances framed by pilasters and topped by a long cornice. The entrances are sheltered by a projecting gabled portico, supported by round Doric columns. A three-stage square tower rises above the portico to a bell-shaped cupola and weathervane.

The church was built in 1764, but has been moved twice and extensively altered. It was originally built without a steeple, and was moved once in 1779 and again in 1824 to its present location. The 1779 move was done due to changing population locations within the community, and was accompanied by the addition of porches to its sides. At the time of the second move, the porches were removed, the main chamber was enlarged, and the tower and portico were added, based on the designs of Elias Carter used in other area meeting houses. In 1853 its exterior was restyled in the popular Greek Revival style.

== See also ==
- National Register of Historic Places listings in Cheshire County, New Hampshire
