= Strafford County Farm =

- U.S. National Register of Historic Places
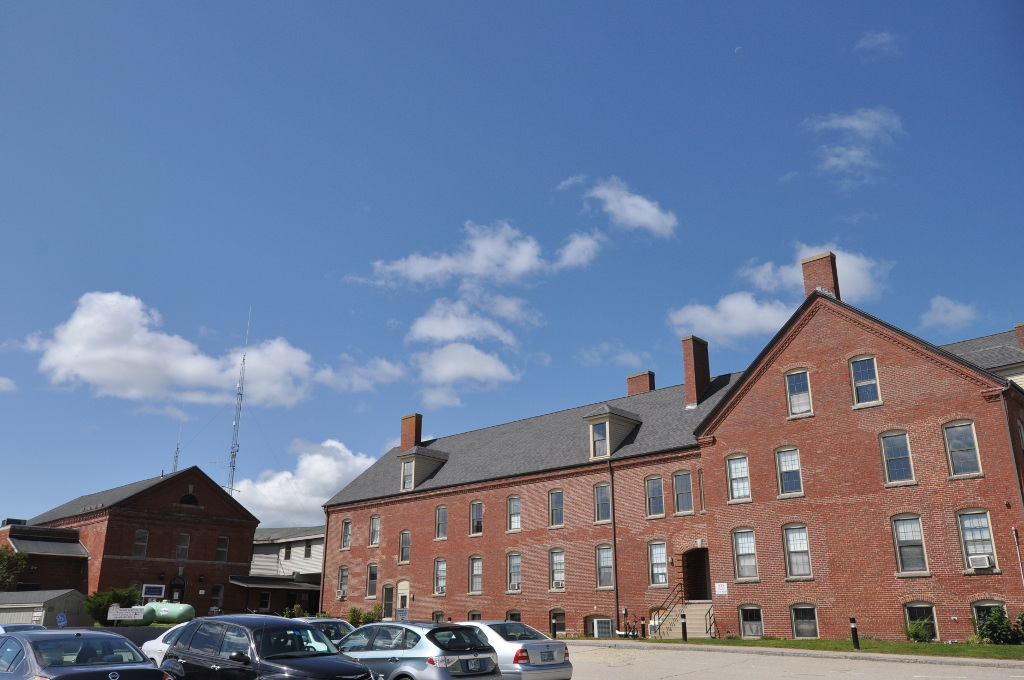
- Almshouse is on the right, jail on the left

- Location within New Hampshire Location within the United States
- Location: County Farm Rd., Dover, New Hampshire
- Coordinates: 43°13′3″N 70°56′31″W
- Area: 3 acres (1.2 ha)
- Built: 1881
- NRHP reference No.: 81000100
- Added to NRHP: February 25, 1981

The Strafford County Farm is a complex of buildings in Dover, New Hampshire, historically associated with the management of the poor and criminals of Strafford County. A significant portion of the farm is now taken up by the modern Strafford County Jail, but several historic buildings survive on the campus, which were listed on the National Register of Historic Places in 1981. These include the 1881 almshouse and the 1907 county jail.

== Description and history ==
The Strafford County Farm was established in 1867, after the state of New Hampshire passed legislation authorizing the creation of such facilities for dealing with a county's indigent, criminal, and insane populations. Strafford County purchased two farms totaling 290 acres (120 ha), on which it established facilities to care and provide work for these groups. The once-extensive facilities included the main almshouse, as well as a blacksmith's shop, carpenter shop, slaughterhouse, and other agricultural facilities. Able-bodied individuals housed there were expected to work in the farm's facilities, and eventually provided as much as 90% of its labor. The almshouse that stands today was built in 1881, along with laundry and boiler houses that also survive nearby. These buildings were designed by F.N. Footman of Somersworth. The almshouse originally housed convicted criminals in its basement.

On January 7, 1881, a fire that started in the furnace room destroyed all of the farm's buildings and took the lives of 13 people. In February 1893, the complex was the site of a significant fire as the "insane asylum" building was completely destroyed, resulting in the death of 41 inmates.

The county jail was built in 1907 adjacent to the almshouse, to a design by G. Lord. The farm operation was terminated in 1971, and the new county jail was opened in 2004.

The county farm complex is located in northwestern Dover, with the building complex bounded on the north by County Farm Road and the south and west by the Cocheco River. The historic buildings are on the west side of the complex, which is now dominated by the 2004 jail. The almshouse is a large three-story brick structure originally designed to house up to 300 individuals. This building's once-impressive facade is somewhat obscured by the presence of the 1970 nursing home which stands in front of it, and to which it is now connected. The county jail is a 2 1/2 story brick building just south of the almshouse.

== See also ==
- National Register of Historic Places listings in Strafford County, New Hampshire
- List of disasters in New Hampshire by death toll
