= East Andover Village Center Historic District =

Historic district in New Hampshire, United States

- U.S. National Register of Historic Places
- U.S. Historic district
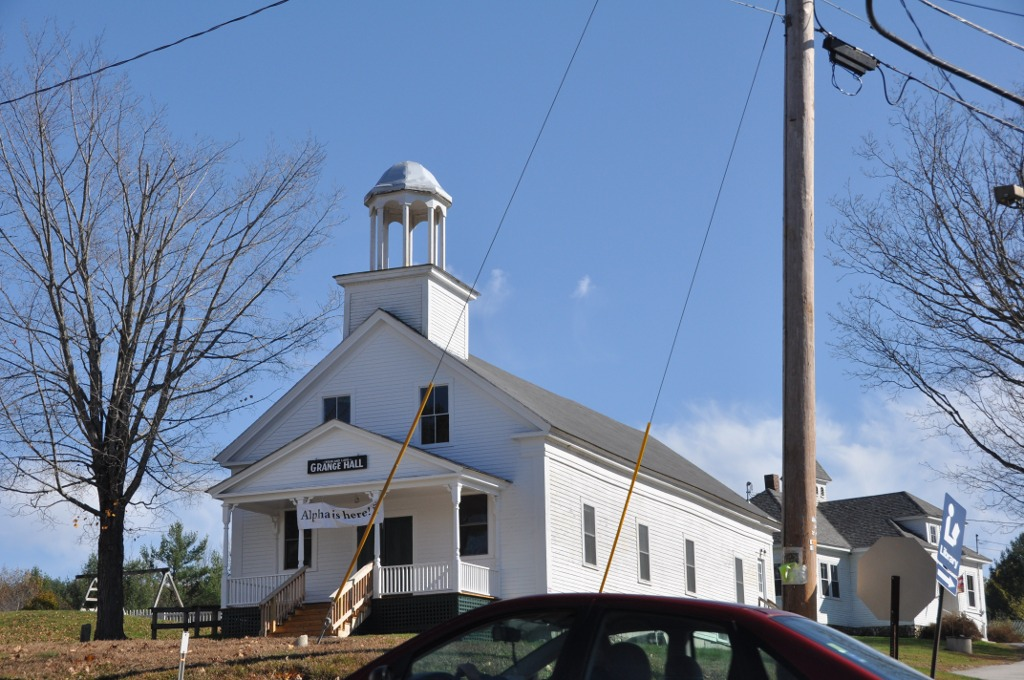
- The grange hall; the school is behind it in this photo

- Location within New Hampshire Location within the United States
- Location: Jct. Rt. 11 and Chase Hill Rd., Andover, New Hampshire
- Coordinates: 43°27′34″N 71°44′51″W
- Area: 2.2 acres (0.89 ha)
- Built: 1840
- Architect: Bailey, Horace
- Architectural style: Greek Revival
- NRHP reference No.: 89000191
- Added to NRHP: March 16, 1989

The East Andover Village Center Historic District encompasses the historic village center of East Andover, New Hampshire, United States. The 2.2-acre (0.89 ha) district includes a cemetery and three buildings: the Andover Congregational Church, the Highland Lake Grange Hall, and the East Andover Schoolhouse. It is located at the corner of New Hampshire Route 11 and Chase Hill Road. The district is unified by the appearance of the three buildings (all are sheathed in clapboards and painted white), and their styling, which is predominantly vernacular 19th century.

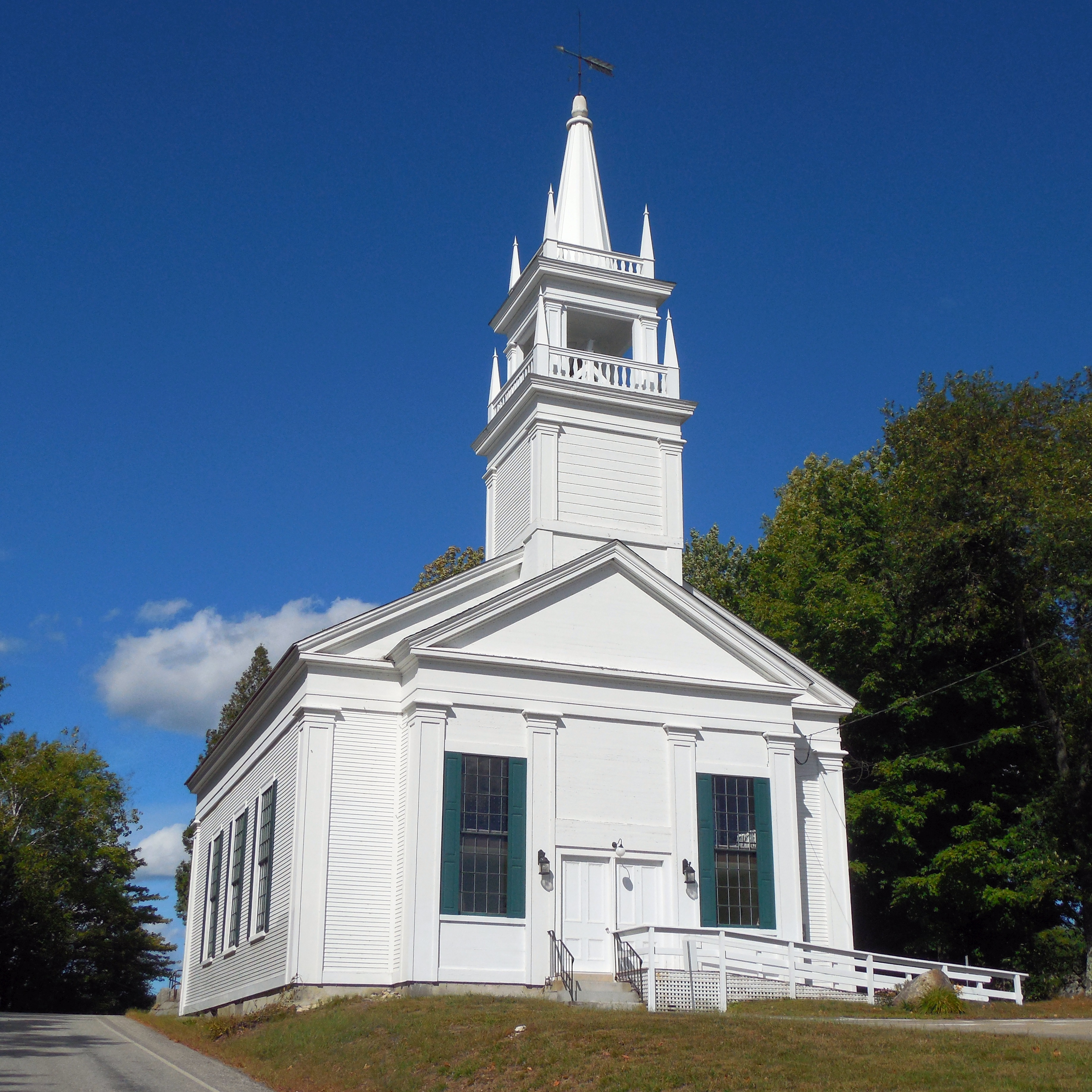
The First Congregational Church in the East Andover Village Center Historic District

The Andover Congregational Church is the oldest of the three buildings, built in 1796 to provide space for civic and religious functions in the town. It is a two-story wood-frame building, with a pair of entrances on the main facade, which provide access to a vestibule area, from which access to the main hall is gained, with stairs leading up to galleries on either side. The building was used by the town for meetings and by several religious organizations for services, but had by 1822 fallen into some disrepair. It was extensively rebuilt in 1840, including turning the building so that its main facade faced south. This work including the addition of the tower and the Greek Revival styling the building now shows. It has received only minor modifications since then.

The Old North Church Cemetery was deeded to the town in 1805, although it seems to have been used before then, since at least two burials predate this transfer. Burial plots are laid out in north–south rows in the half-acre cemetery, which was filled up by the late 19th century. The cemetery stretches out along Route 11, behind (north of) the church.

The Highland Lake Grange Hall was built in 1850 by the Mountain Club, an East Andover literary club that sought a meeting place for itself, and wanted to promote secondary education in the town. The building was inaugurated that year as the Highland Lake Institute, an academy that lasted just five years. It then saw a succession of academic and civic uses, and was enlarged in 1893 and renamed Union Hall. In 1938 the Union Hall Associates sold the building to the local grange chapter, which had been meeting on the premises since 1894. Little modification has been made to the building since 1893.

The East Andover Schoolhouse was built in 1903 to replace the old District 10 schoolhouse, which had been located just south of the grange hall. Located just east of the grange hall, the building served as a public school until 1962; its most significant alteration in this period was the addition of a wood and coal shed to the rear. The building was sold to the church, which has since used it for Sunday School and as a nursery.

The district was listed on the National Register of Historic Places in 1989.

== See also ==
- National Register of Historic Places listings in Merrimack County, New Hampshire
