= Canaan train wreck =

1907 railroad accident in New Hampshire

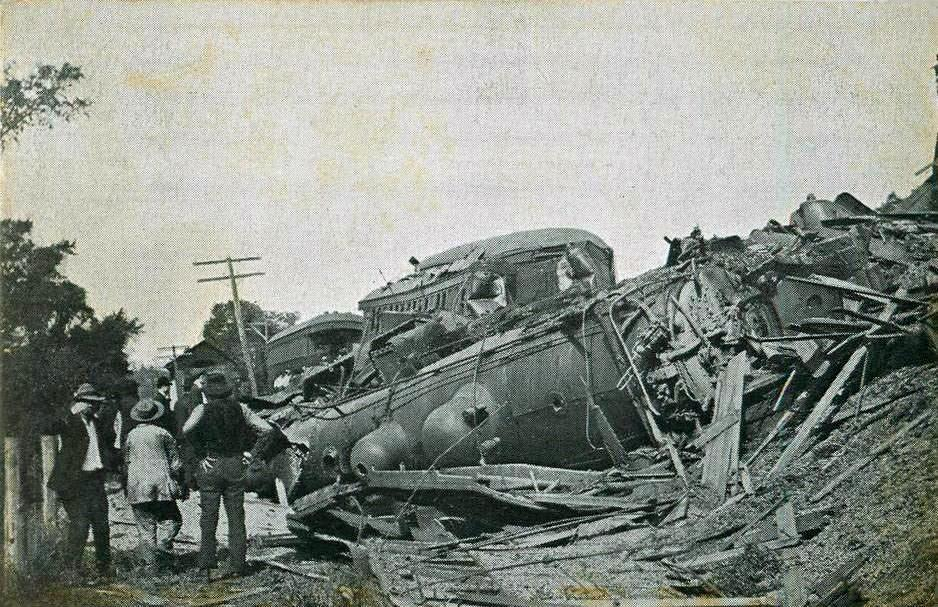
- Aftermath of the collision

Details
- Date: September 15, 1907 (118 years ago); 4:26 am
- Location: Canaan, New Hampshire
- Coordinates: 43.64836°N 72.07244°W (Note: Coordinates are approximate, based on a 1975 map in the B&M Bulletin. The official accident report described the location as "Eighteen hundred feet from the west end and fifty-four hundred feet from the east end of straight line and level track between Canaan and West Canaan, which runs nearly east and west there".)
- Country: U.S.
- Line: Concord division
- Operator: Boston and Maine Railroad
- Incident type: Head-on collision
- Cause: Train dispatcher error

Statistics
- Trains: 2
- Passengers: 150
- Crew: 11
- Deaths: 26 (all passengers)
- Injured: 17–20 (Note: The official accident report stated "seventeen seriously injured" in one place, and "injuring twenty others" in another.)

The Canaan train wreck (Note: Also referred to as the Canaan Wreck or Canaan Disaster in some sources.) was a railroad accident that occurred on September 15, 1907, near Canaan, New Hampshire. A northbound freight train and a southbound passenger train had a head-on collision, which resulted in 26 fatalities. The official investigation attributed the incident to an error made by a train dispatcher of the Boston and Maine Railroad. It remains the train wreck with the largest loss of life in New Hampshire history.

== Trains ==
Each of the below was being operated by the Boston and Maine Railroad. The first two were directly involved in the collision, while the third was indirectly involved.

=== Quebec Express (no. 30) ===
The Quebec Express provided service between Quebec City, Quebec, and Boston, Massachusetts, partially via the Quebec Central Railway. It comprised a locomotive (Note: Engine 780 (renumbered as 2063 in 1911) had a 4-6-0 wheel configuration ("ten-wheeler") and was built in 1900 in Rhode Island.) and four cars: a baggage car, passenger coach, smoking car, and Pullman sleeping car. (Note: Some contemporary news reports listed the train as having four sleeping cars rather than one.) There were six crew members and an estimated 150 passengers onboard, many of whom had boarded the train in Sherbrooke, where they had attended the Sherbrooke Fair. The train made a stop in White River Junction, Vermont, and departed there at 3:56 a.m., 45 minutes later than its scheduled departure of 3:11 a.m., heading to its next stop in Concord, New Hampshire.

=== Freight train (no. 267) ===
Freight train 267 was manned by a crew of five and consisted of a locomotive (Note: Engine 688 (renumbered as 1436 in 1911) had a 2-6-0 wheel configuration ("Mogul") and was built in 1907.) and 27 freight cars, of which 21 were loaded, weighing an estimated 770 tons. It departed Concord at 12:45 a.m., bound for White River Junction. Shortly after 4:00 a.m., the train stopped in Canaan, New Hampshire, and departed within 15 minutes toward White River Junction. The engineer intended to place the train on a siding in West Canaan, about 4 1/2 miles (7.2 km) outside of Canaan, to allow the express train to pass.

=== Montreal Express (no. 34) ===
The Montreal Express provided service between Montreal and Boston, partially via the Central Vermont Railway. Its route included a stop in White River Junction, where it was scheduled to leave at 3:24 a.m.; however, it was delayed by about 1 1/2 hours on the day of the incident.

== Collision ==
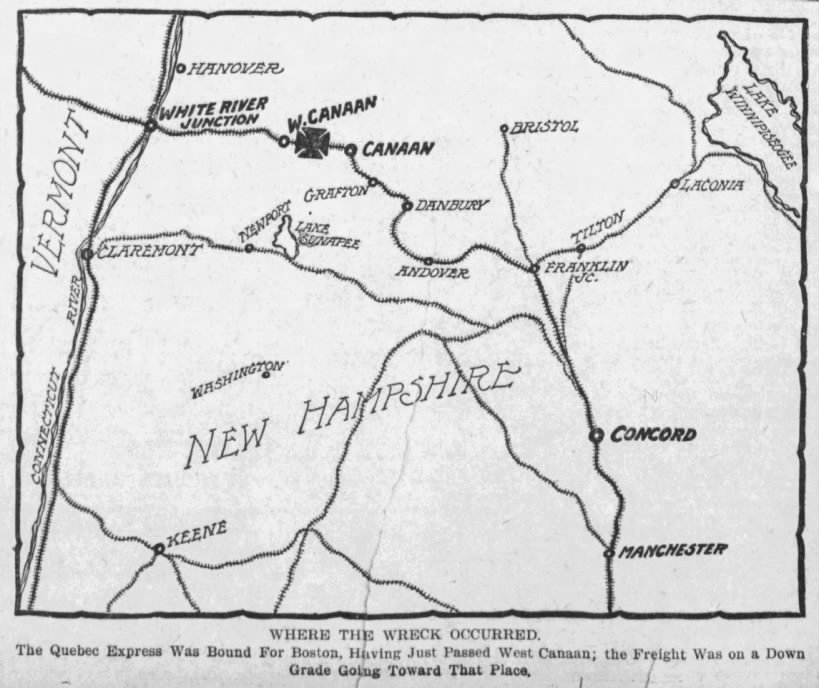
Map of the accident location as published in The Boston Globe

At 4:26 a.m., (Note: Some sources give slightly different times for the collision.) the Quebec Express and the freight train suffered a head-on collision about two miles (3.2 km) east of the West Canaan station. (Note: The location was described in contemporary newspaper reports as being four miles (6.4 km) north of the Canaan station. However, the railway between Canaan and West Canaan ran east-west.) The freight train was estimated to be traveling at 25 miles per hour (40 km/h), and the express train at 30 to 35 miles per hour (48 to 56 km/h). Due to foggy conditions, crew members on the two trains did not see each other until they were within 300 to 400 feet (91 to 122 m) of each other. Additionally, wetness from the morning fog coated the rails, lessening the effect of braking. The engineers of both trains cut power and applied emergency brakes, then jumped off the trains along with their firemen—they all survived.

The collision resulted in the deaths of 26 passengers on the express train; another 17 passengers were seriously injured. (Note: The official accident report listed 25 people who had been killed in the wreck and noted that one more had been fatally injured. The 26th fatality was a woman who had sustained head and internal injuries; she died at Mary Hitchcock Hospital in Hanover, New Hampshire, on September 24.) Those killed were in the passenger coach, as the baggage car telescoped through it due to the force of the impact. The official accident report later stated:

The fatal and serious injuries were to people in the passenger coach through which the body of the baggage car was driven nearly the entire length in a diagonal direction, cutting or crushing out the north side of the car, all the seats on that side, and about two thirds of those on the other side, but leaving the floor and roof and south side nearly intact.

Some of the contents of the freight train, notably printer's paper and cornmeal, was strewn over the track.

== Investigation ==
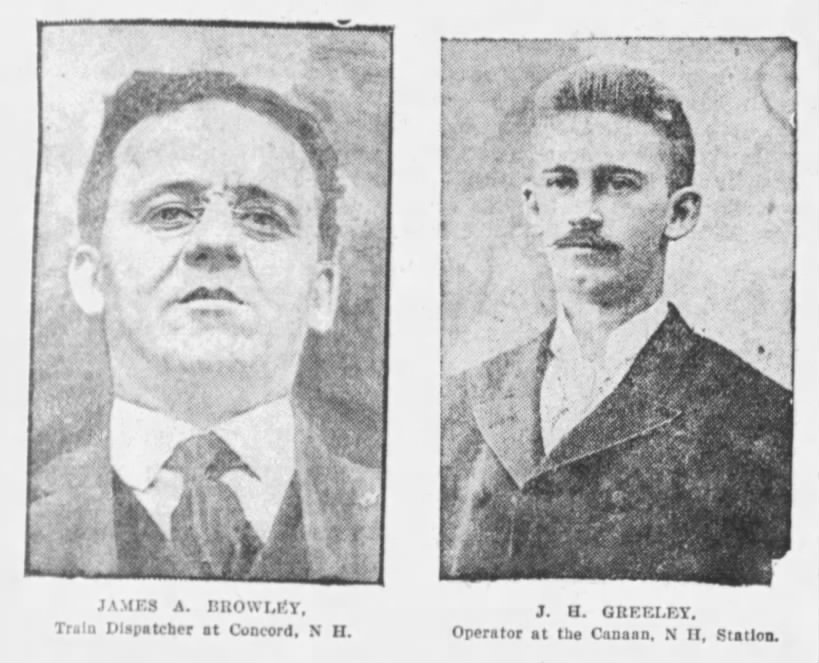
James A. Browley (left), Concord dispatcher, and John S. Greeley (right), Canaan operator

The day after the accident, newspapers reported that the cause was believed to be "a blunder in handling train orders", although who was responsible was not known. The following day, September 17, a Boston and Maine official stated that either the train dispatcher in Concord, James A. Browley, or the station operator in Canaan, John S. Greeley, was responsible.

On September 18, the New Hampshire Railroad Commission announced they would conduct an inquiry into the accident, to begin on September 24 in Concord. The inquiry focused on a train order issued from Browley to Greeley. According to Browley's records, the order as issued from Concord pertained to the Montreal Express:

No. 34 will run one hour and ten minutes late West Lebanon to East Andover and one hour late East Andover to Concord.

However, Greeley's records indicated the order as received in Canaan was for "No. 30", referring to the Quebec Express. Given the apparent delay of the Quebec Express, the engineer of the freight train believed he had ample time to reach West Canaan before a passenger train would be traveling towards Canaan on the same section of track.

The commission's report provided a detailed explanation of the train order process in use at the time, which was telegraph based and required all orders to be repeated back for verification, along with the activities of Browley and Greeley as recorded in their log books leading up to the accident. While there was no direct finding about the train order in question—whether Browley issued it incorrectly or Greeley received it incorrectly—the commission highlighted two errors made by Browley:

- The train order in question should have been issued to three stations simultaneously, so that each operator could act as a check on the others as they repeated the order back; however, Browley delayed in sending it to Canaan.
- Once the actual positions of the trains became known to Browley, "it was his immediate duty" to contact the station in Enfield in an attempt to have the Quebec Express flagged to stop there, but he failed to do so.

The commission further opined that if Greeley had first erred by mistaking 34 for 30 in the order, he "doubtless[ly]" repeated it back as 30, in which case Browley should have caught the error. The commission felt it was "much more probable than otherwise" that Browley, having recently logged a different train order for the Quebec Express, had "carried No. 30 in his mind", then specified the incorrect train number in the order to Greeley and did not detect the error when Greeley repeated the order back. The commission's findings were front-page news in The Boston Globe of October 12, 1907.

== Later events ==
The railroad offered to settle claims related to the accident for $5,000 ($172,768 in 2025) per person.

To reduce the chance of confusion, the Boston and Maine changed train numbers, with the Quebec Express becoming No. 4 while No. 6 was used for the Montreal Express. However, for unrelated reasons, another collision occurred two years later in the same area. On September 21, 1909, the Montreal Express had a rear-end collision with the Quebec Express near the West Canaan station (then known as "Pattee"), after the Quebec Express had trouble maintaining speed and failed to adequately warn the Montreal Express. No passengers died, but an engineer and fireman on the Montreal Express were killed, as was a trespasser who had been riding on that train outside the baggage car. The engineer who was killed, John P. Callahan, had been the engineer of the Quebec Express during the 1907 accident. The commission recommended the installation of automatic block signaling (ABS) on the line in question, which the railroad implemented in 1910.

James A. Browley became a station agent for the Central Vermont Railway in Enosburg Falls, Vermont; in late 1913, he was arrested for embezzling $2,500 ($81,439 in 2025) from the railroad. Whether the charge was substantiated or not is unclear. He moved away from the area in 1919, to take a job with the Canadian Pacific Railway in the Northwest. John S. Greeley remained with the Boston and Maine railroad until his death in December 1925; he was killed in a single-car accident in Lebanon, New Hampshire, when his car slid off an icy road as he was driving home from work.

A recounting of Canaan railroad accidents in the B&M Bulletin in 1975 reached a different conclusion regarding the 1907 collision, the author writing that "the night operator at Canaan made the fatal error of writing 30 instead of 34 on his copy of the order."

A plaque outlining the 1907 collision is located along what is now the Northern Rail Trail in Canaan.

== See also ==
- List of disasters in New Hampshire by death toll
