= Tucker Mountain Schoolhouse =

- U.S. National Register of Historic Places
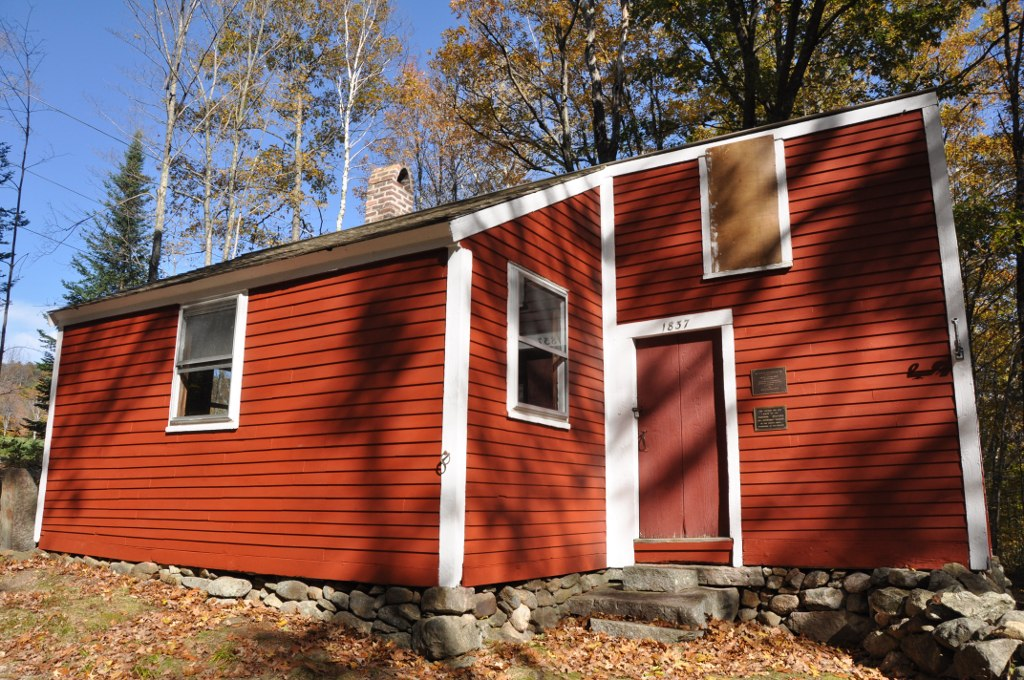

- Location within New Hampshire Location within the United States
- Location: Tucker Mountain Road, Andover, New Hampshire
- Coordinates: 43°29′1″N 71°45′42″W
- Area: less than one acre
- Built: 1837
- Built by: Tucker, Benjamin
- NRHP reference No.: 05000175
- Added to NRHP: March 18, 2005

The Tucker Mountain Schoolhouse is a historic one-room schoolhouse on Tucker Mountain Road in Andover, New Hampshire. The small wood-frame building was built in 1837, and served as a schoolhouse until 1893, when it was closed due to declining enrollments. The building was listed on the National Register of Historic Places in 2005. It is now owned by the Andover Historical Society, and is occasionally open to the public in the summer.

== Description and history ==
The Tucker Mountain Schoolhouse stands in a remote rural area of eastern Andover, north of the village of East Andover. It is on the east side of Tucker Mountain Road, near its northern end. It is a wooded post-and-beam structure, covered by a gabled roof and set on an unmortared fieldstone foundation. The classroom is 16 feet (4.9 m) wide and 18 feet (5.5 m) long. A small ell was added to the building to provide a weather break, a place to store firewood, and a privy area. The interior of the school has retained its furnishings: the desks are bolted to the floor, which slopes slightly to afford students in the rear a better view of the front of room. The interior walls are finished in pine boards painted black, which served as chalkboards. The building exterior is finished in wooden clapboards.

The school was built in 1837 by Benjamin Tucker for $100, on land donated by his brother William. It served the families of the local mountain area until 1893, when it was closed due to declining enrollments. It was acquired by a nearby resident in the 1960s and donated to the local historical society. It is open to the public some Sundays in the summer, or by appointment.

== See also ==
- National Register of Historic Places listings in Merrimack County, New Hampshire
