= Robert Olmstead =

American novelist and educator (born 1954)

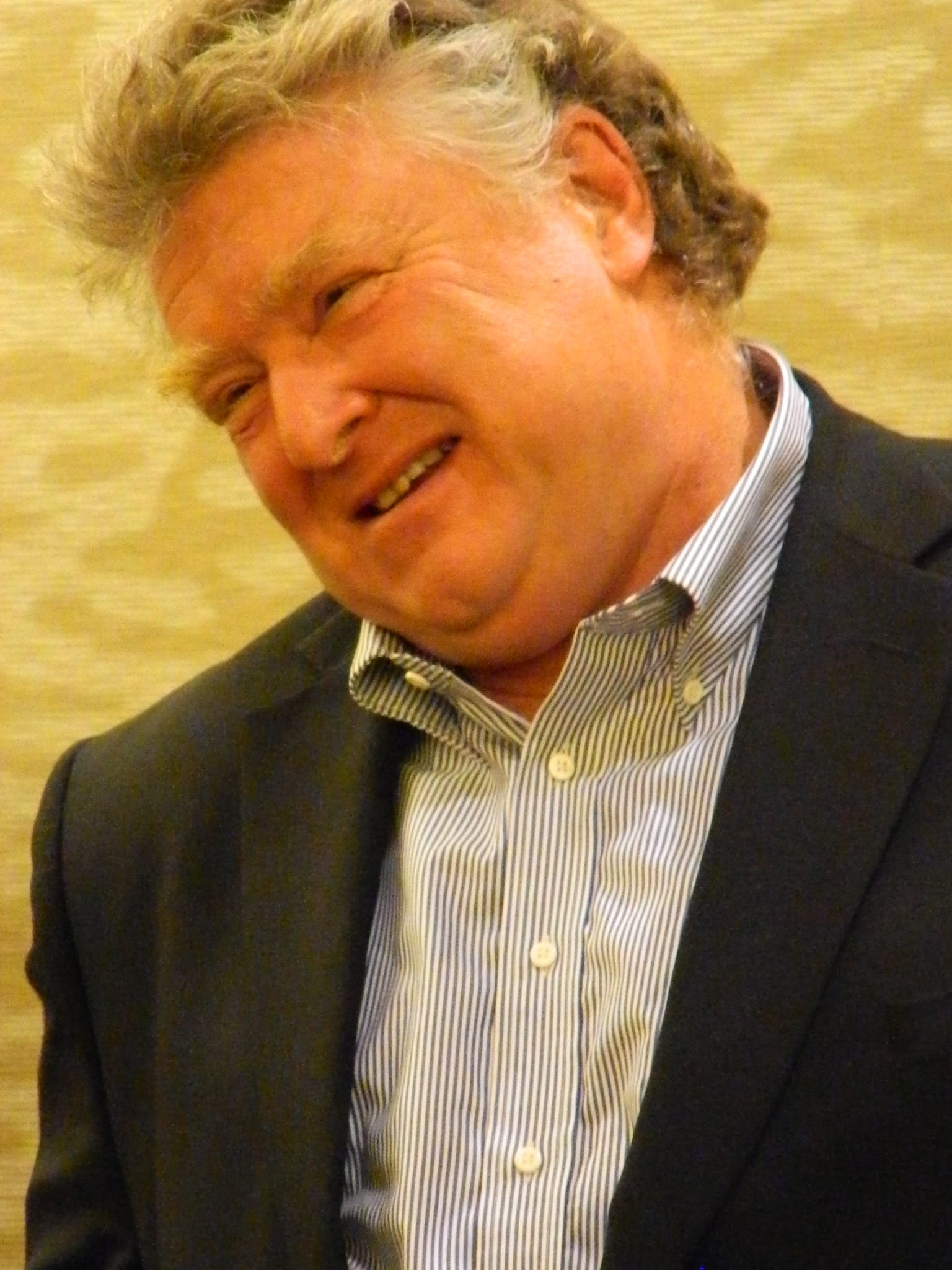
- Olmstead at a book signing at Barnes & Noble in New York
- Born: January 3, 1954 (age 72); Westmoreland, New Hampshire, U.S.
- Education: Syracuse University
- Occupation: Novelist
- Writing career
- Notable work: Coal Black Horse

Robert Olmstead (born January 3, 1954) is an American novelist and educator.

== Early life and education ==
Olmstead was born in 1954 in Westmoreland, New Hampshire. He grew up on a farm. After high school, he enrolled at Davidson College with a football scholarship, but left school after three semesters in which he compiled a poor academic record. He later attended Syracuse University, where he studied with Raymond Carver and Tobias Wolff and received bachelor's and master's degrees, in 1977 and 1983, respectively.

== Career ==
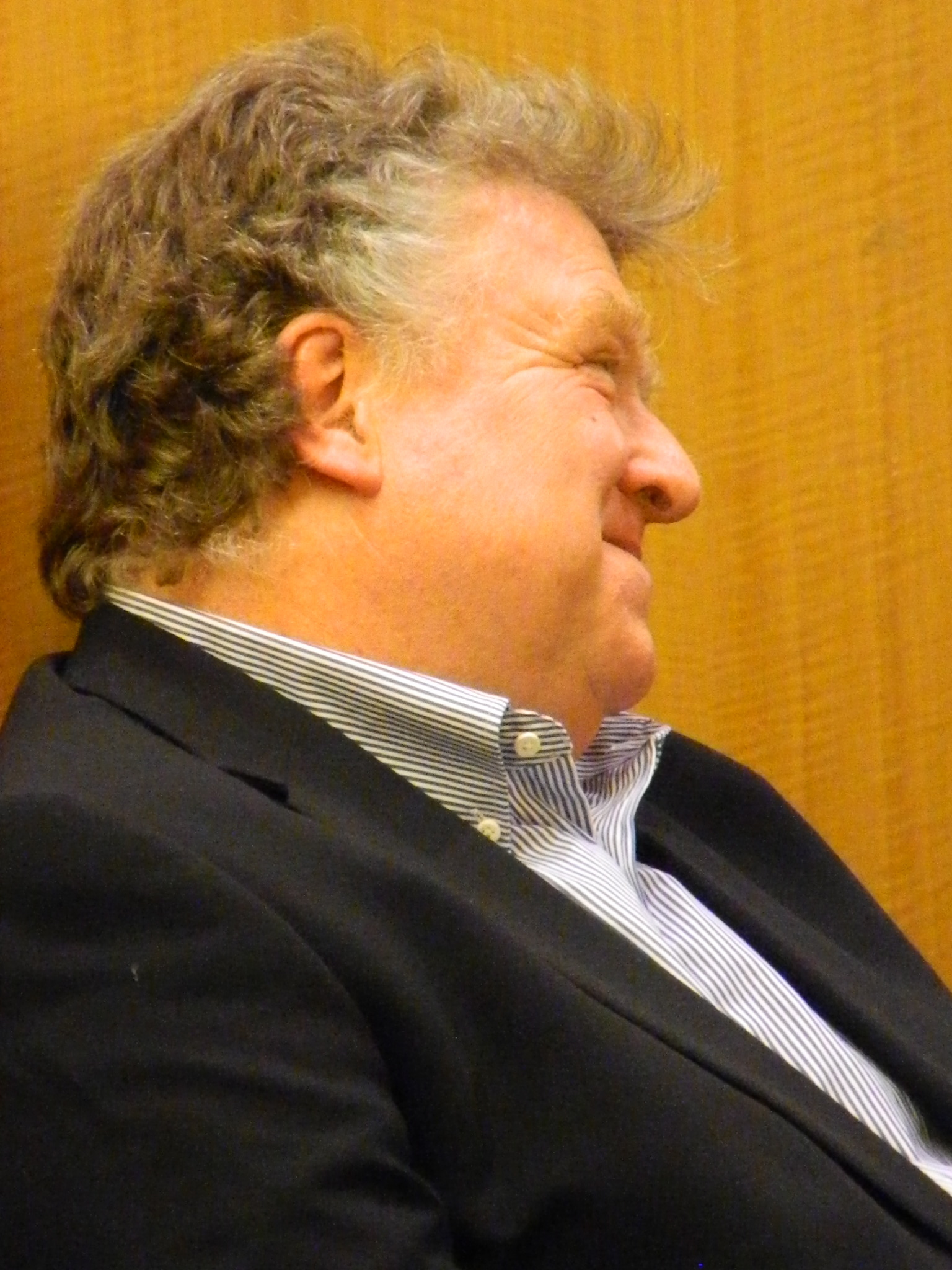
Olmstead engaging audience at New York book signing

Olmstead was the former director of Creative Writing at Ohio Wesleyan University and now serves as an emeritus faculty member at the university. He has also served as the senior writer in residence at Dickinson College and as the director of creative writing at Boise State University. Olmstead teaches in the Low-Residency MFA program in creative writing at Converse College.

Olmstead is the author of the novels America by Land, A Trail of Heart's Blood Wherever We Go, Soft Water, Far Bright Star, and Coal Black Horse. He is also the author of the memoir Stay Here With Me, as well as River Dogs, a collection of short stories, and the textbook Elements of the Writing Craft. He was the recipient of a Guggenheim Fellowship in 1989 and an NEA Literature Fellowship in 1993.

His novel Coal Black Horse (2007) received national acclaim, including the 2007 Chicago Tribune Heartland Prize for Fiction and the 2008 Ohioana Book Award for Fiction; it was also selected for the "On the Same Page Cincinnati" reading program and the Choose to Read Ohio's 2011 booklist.

Booklist named his novel Far Bright Star (2009) (the second book in the Coal Black Horse trilogy) as one of the Top Ten Westerns of the Decade; the book also received the 2010 Western Writers of America Spur Award. One reviewer praised Olmstead's ability to "translate nature's revelatory beauty into words", commenting that Coal Black Horse evokes what Henry David Thoreau described in Walden as "the indescribable innocence and beneficence of Nature"; by contrast, the Mexican desert of Far Bright Star is "the place of the sun shriveled and the dried up". The Chicago Tribune review praised the authenticity of the imagery and experiences in Olmstead's writing, while also comparing his writing to that of Ernest Hemingway. It noted the influence of contemporary events, such as the guerrilla warfare during the U.S. occupation of Fallujah during the Iraq War.

== Works ==
Olmstead's published works include:

- River Dogs (1987)
- Soft Water (1988)
- A Trail of Heart's Blood Wherever We Go (1990)
- America By Land (1993)
- Stay Here With Me (1997)
- Coal Black Horse (2007)
- Far Bright Star (2009)
- The Coldest Night (2012)
- Savage Country (2017)
