= Westmoreland, New Hampshire =

- Town
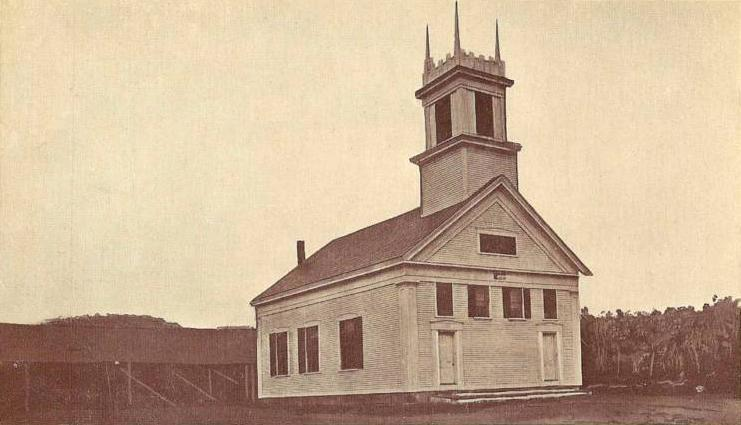
- Union Church c. 1915

- Seal

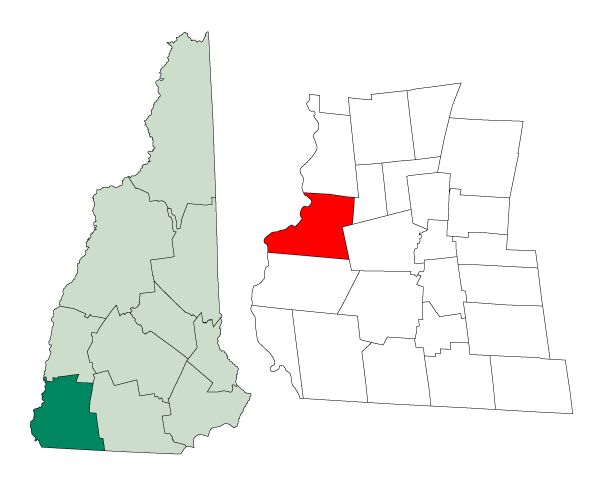
- Location in Cheshire County, New Hampshire
- Coordinates: 42°58′08″N 72°25′55″W
- Country: United States
- State: New Hampshire
- County: Cheshire
- Incorporated: 1752
- Villages: Westmoreland; East Westmoreland; Park Hill; Poocham

Area
  - Total: 36.8 sq mi (95.4 km^{2})
  - Land: 35.8 sq mi (92.7 km^{2})
  - Water: 1.0 sq mi (2.7 km^{2}) 2.80%
- Elevation: 522 ft (159 m)

Population (2020)
  - Total: 1,706
  - Density: 48/sq mi (18.4/km^{2})
- Time zone: UTC-5 (Eastern)
  - Summer (DST): UTC-4 (Eastern)
- ZIP code: 03467
- Area code: 603
- FIPS code: 33-82660
- GNIS feature ID: 873753
- Website: westmorelandnh.gov

Westmoreland is a town in Cheshire County, New Hampshire, United States. The population was 1,706 at the 2020 census, down from 1,874 at the 2010 census, and was an estimated 1,757 in 2025. Westmoreland is historically an agricultural town, with much arable farmland.

== History ==
=== Indigenous peoples ===
Prior to European colonization, present-day Westmoreland was inhabited by numerous indigenous tribes. The upper Connecticut River valley was a popular region for short-term Indigenous villages mostly used for hunting and fishing. Tribes such as the Pennacook Confederation and the Abenaki were frequent visitors to the area. In the 1670s, King Philip's War led to the migration of most indigenous tribes to Canada. Indigenous peoples did not understand the concept of individual land ownership, which resulted in numerous misunderstandings and conflict between them and English settlers. The English settlers purchase of land and construction of permanent settlements disrupted the hunting and fishing traditions of the indigenous tribes.

While Indigenous activity was common in Westmoreland, not many aboriginal sites have been found. A "Pow-wow Rock" can be located off Poocham Road in Westmoreland across from the Thompson place (1970). The name Poocham is an Abenaki word for "gathering place". The Pow-wow Rock is a large boulder that was deposited by glaciers and is measured at 12 by 14 by 8 feet (3.7 by 4.3 by 2.4 m) in height. At this location, records describe the hosting of Indigenous pow-wows and the exchanging of prisoners.

=== Colonial ===
Once known as "Great Meadow", the town was first granted in 1735 by Governor Jonathan Belcher of Massachusetts as "Number 2", second in a line of Connecticut River fort towns designed to protect the colonies from Indian attack. This part of the river was a favorite Indian campsite, and the settlers who came beginning in 1741 were several times victims of attack. When the border between Massachusetts and the Province of New Hampshire was fixed (with Number 2 on the New Hampshire side), the town was regranted in 1752 by Governor Benning Wentworth as Westmoreland, named for John Fane, 7th Earl of Westmorland.

The Park Hill Meetinghouse, built in 1762, has a Paul Revere bell. Considered one of the most beautiful churches in New England, it was moved to its present site by oxen in 1779 and renovated in 1826.

== Geography ==
According to the United States Census Bureau, the town has a total area of 36.8 square miles (95.4 km^{2}), of which 35.8 square miles (92.7 km^{2}) is land and 1.0 square mile (2.7 km^{2}), or 2.80%, is water. Westmoreland is bounded on the west by the Connecticut River, which is the state border with Vermont. Hyland Hill, elevation 1,510 feet (460 m) and the highest point in town, is on the eastern border and although it is now private land, it is a local hiking and hunting destination.

Westmoreland is served by state routes 12 and 63.

=== Adjacent municipalities ===
- Walpole (north)
- Surry (northeast)
- Keene (east)
- Chesterfield (south)
- Dummerston, Vermont (southwest)
- Putney, Vermont (west)

== Demographics ==
Historical population
Census	Pop.	Note	%±
1790	2,018		—
1800	2,066		2.4%
1810	1,937		−6.2%
1820	2,029		4.7%
1830	1,647		−18.8%
1840	1,546		−6.1%
1850	1,678		8.5%
1860	1,285		−23.4%
1870	1,256		−2.3%
1880	1,095		−12.8%
1890	830		−24.2%
1900	875		5.4%
1910	758		−13.4%
1920	615		−18.9%
1930	745		21.1%
1940	755		1.3%
1950	789		4.5%
1960	921		16.7%
1970	998		8.4%
1980	1,452		45.5%
1990	1,596		9.9%
2000	1,747		9.5%
2010	1,874		7.3%
2020	1,706		−9.0%
2024 (est.)	1,737		1.8%
U.S. Decennial Census

At the 2000 census there were 1,747 people, 576 households, and 445 families living in the town. The population density was 48.7 inhabitants per square mile (18.8/km^{2}). There were 618 housing units at an average density of 17.2 per square mile (6.7/km^{2}). The racial makeup of the town was 97.82% White, 0.34% African American, 0.29% Native American, 0.80% Asian, 0.34% from other races, and 0.40% from two or more races. Hispanic or Latino of any race were 0.92%.

Of the 576 households 31.6% had children under the age of 18 living with them, 69.6% were married couples living together, 3.8% had a female householder with no husband present, and 22.7% were non-families. 17.4% of households were one person and 7.8% were one person aged 65 or older. The average household size was 2.57 and the average family size was 2.92.

The age distribution was 19.9% under the age of 18, 6.6% from 18 to 24, 26.8% from 25 to 44, 27.4% from 45 to 64, and 19.3% 65 or older. The median age was 43 years. For every 100 females, there were 97.6 males. For every 100 females age 18 and over, there were 99.6 males.

The median household income was $55,875 and the median family income was $62,857. Males had a median income of $40,515 versus $28,456 for females. The per capita income for the town was $24,488. About 0.4% of families and 2.5% of the population were below the poverty line, including none of those under age 18 and 5.4% of those age 65 or over.

== Notable people ==
- Clinton Babbitt (1831–1907), US congressman
- Goldsmith Bailey (1823–1862), US congressman
- Nathaniel S. Benton (1792–1869), Secretary of State, state senator from New York
- Joseph Buffum, Jr. (1784–1874), US congressman, judge
- Martin Butterfield (1790–1866), US congressman
- Levi K. Fuller (1841–1896), 44th governor of Vermont
- John M. Goodenow (1782–1838), US congressman
- Ernest Hebert (born 1941), author
- Thomas B. Marsh (1800–1866), religious leader
- Robert Olmstead (born 1954), author
- Maria Brewster Brooks Stafford (1809–1896), educator
- Everett Warner (1877–1963), artist, print-maker
