= Richard Potter (magician) =

African-American magician

- Born: 1782 or 1783; Hopkinton, Massachusetts, U.S.
- Died: September 20, 1835 (aged 51–52); Andover, New Hampshire, U.S.
- Occupations: Magician, hypnotist, ventriloquist
- Years active: 1811–1835
- Spouse: Sally Harris (m. 1808)
- Children: 3

Richard Potter (c. 1783 – September 20, 1835) (Note: Potter's gravestone states he died on September 30, 1835, aged 52—however, with regards to both Potter and his wife, "It is supposed that their ages were greater than given on the headstones.") was an American magician, hypnotist and ventriloquist. He was the first American-born magician to gain fame in his own country and is widely considered the first African-American celebrity.

== Biography ==
Potter was born in Hopkinton, Massachusetts. Some sources state his father was Sir Charles Henry Frankland, one of the Frankland baronets and a tax collector for the Port of Boston, and that his mother, Dinah, (Note: "Dinah" was an American generic name for a slave woman and, by extension, any woman of African-American descent.) was a black slave in the household. However, Sir Charles died in England in 1768, over a decade before Potter's birth, and others sources indicate Potter's father was a clergyman named George Simpson. Potter obscured most of his early life and encouraged speculation. Evidently, he went to Hopkinton schools.

Potter became a well-known magician in the New England area from 1811 to his death. Various accounts differ on the reason, but agree that he went to Europe and joined John Rannie, a Scottish ventriloquist and magician. Rannie came to the United States in 1800. Potter toured with Rannie as one of his assistants in the Eastern United States. In 1811, Rannie retired to Scotland and encouraged Potter to continue on his own. This is also the year that Potter became a Mason of African Lodge No. 459 and was part of founding the Prince Hall Masonry.

Potter performed up and down the East Coast, going as far south as Alabama. One of Potter's notable run-ins with prejudice occurred in Mobile, Alabama, where he was turned away from a hotel because of his race. Despite this issue, Potter still made over $4,000 during that visit. (Note: The claimed amount is viewed as unrealistic in some sources.)

In 1814, Potter purchased about 175 acres (71 ha) in the village of Andover, New Hampshire. He built a large house on his estate. Known for his showmanship in all aspects of life, the estate included two life-size wooden carvings of human figures on pillars. Legend has it that "the Potter Place" served as the inspiration for the design of the New Hampshire State House in Concord, built in 1819.

Potter married Sally Harris of Roxbury, Massachusetts, in 1808. Potter claimed she was a Penobscot Native American. They had three children. One son was killed in 1816, "run over by a load of corn", and their daughter was believed to have lived only a short time. Potter died on September 20, 1835, and his wife the following year. They are buried in a small graveyard on the property he bought in Andover. In the early 1840s, the graves were moved a short distance, due to railroad construction on the property. The Potters were survived only by one child, a son also named Richard.

=== Legacy ===
The section of Andover around his former estate is known as "Potter Place". He inspired the character Samuel Peyton in the 1956 novel Peyton Place by Grace Metalious. Both Richard Potter and Potter Place are featured on a New Hampshire historical marker (number 54) erected in 1968. From the late 1960s til present, Robert Olson, a modern re-enactor based at Old Sturbridge Village in Massachusetts adopted Potter's persona and performed "an authentic rendition of Potter's repertoire" at various venues.

In 2022, the Black Heritage Trail of New Hampshire installed and unveiled a historic marker to honor him and his work as America's first Black magician.

== See also ==
- Columbian Museum, a venue in Boston where Potter performed
- Potter Place Railroad Station, a historic railroad station, near which Potter and his wife are buried
- Black Heritage Trail of NH historic markers throughout the state
