= Andover, New Hampshire =

Town in New Hampshire, United States

- Town
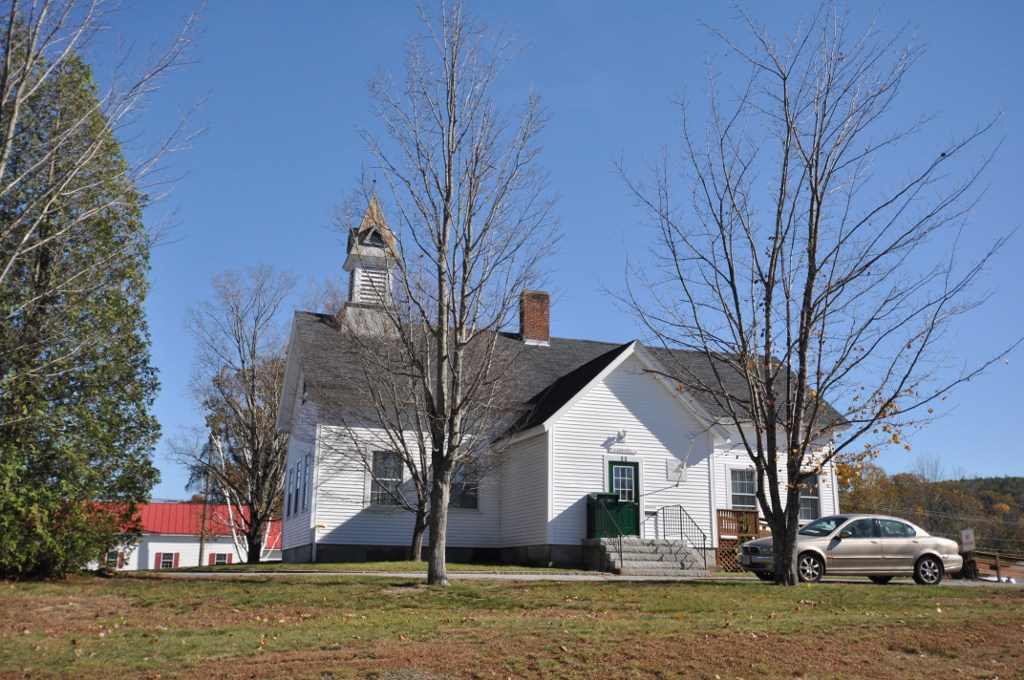
- Town hall

- Seal

- Location in Merrimack County and the state of New Hampshire
- Coordinates: 43°26′48″N 71°47′36″W
- Country: United States
- State: New Hampshire
- County: Merrimack
- Incorporated: 1779
- Villages: Andover; Cilleyville; East Andover; Potter Place; West Andover

Area
  - Total: 41.0 sq mi (106.3 km^{2})
  - Land: 40.2 sq mi (104.0 km^{2})
  - Water: 0.89 sq mi (2.3 km^{2}) 2.18%
- Elevation: 640 ft (200 m)

Population (2020)
  - Total: 2,406
  - Density: 60/sq mi (23.1/km^{2})
- Time zone: UTC-5 (Eastern)
  - Summer (DST): UTC-4 (Eastern)
- ZIP codes: 03216 (Andover); 03231 (East Andover)
- Area code: 603
- FIPS code: 33-01460
- GNIS feature ID: 873532
- Website: andover-nh.gov

Andover is a town in Merrimack County, New Hampshire, United States. The population was 2,406 at the 2020 census. Andover includes the villages of Cilleyville, Potter Place, East Andover, and West Andover, in addition to the town center. The town is home to Ragged Mountain State Forest and Proctor Academy, a private coeducational preparatory school.

== History ==
Settled in 1761, the town was originally named "Emerisstown". In 1746 it was granted to Edward Brown and others as "New Breton" or "New Britton", having been granted primarily to soldiers who had taken part in the 1745 capture of Cape Breton during hostilities with the French in Canada. Among those soldiers was their regimental surgeon, Dr. Anthony Emery, a friend of Samuel Phillips Jr., who in 1778 founded the Phillips Andover Academy in Andover, Massachusetts. "New Breton" would be incorporated as "Andover" in 1779, the year Phillips Andover was completed.

In 1822, an academy was established in Andover, although it would close in 1828. Another school was founded in 1848 that would become Proctor Academy, the prestigious institution around which the town's economy is based. Andover is noted for its antique shops, Greek Revival architecture, and two covered bridges. Potter Place Railroad Station, built in 1874 by the Northern Railroad, is listed on the National Register of Historic Places, and today serves as a museum for the Andover Historical Society.

== Geography ==
According to the United States Census Bureau, the town has a total area of 41.0 square miles (106.3 km^{2}), of which 40.2 square miles (104.0 km^{2}) are land and 0.89 square miles (2.3 km^{2}) are water, comprising 2.18% of the town. The central and western parts of Andover are drained by the Blackwater River, a tributary of the Contoocook River, while the eastern part, including Highland Lake, drains via Sucker Brook toward the Pemigewasset River in Franklin. Bradley Lake is in the southern part of the town. The entire town is within the Merrimack River watershed.

Ragged Mountain, elevation 2,286 feet (697 m) above sea level, is on the northern boundary. The northern slopes of Mount Kearsarge occupy the southernmost part of town and contain the town's highest point, 2,460 ft (750 m) above sea level.

Andover includes the villages of East Andover, West Andover, Cilleyville, and Potter Place, named for Richard Potter, an African-American illusionist who lived there in the early 19th century.

=== Adjacent municipalities ===
- Hill (north)
- Franklin (east)
- Salisbury (south)
- Warner (southwest)
- Wilmot (west)
- Danbury (northwest)

== Demographics ==
Historical population
Census	Pop.	Note	%±
1790	645		—
1800	1,133		75.7%
1810	1,259		11.1%
1820	1,642		30.4%
1830	1,324		−19.4%
1840	1,169		−11.7%
1850	1,220		4.4%
1860	1,243		1.9%
1870	1,206		−3.0%
1880	1,204		−0.2%
1890	1,090		−9.5%
1900	1,179		8.2%
1910	1,201		1.9%
1920	1,121		−6.7%
1930	1,031		−8.0%
1940	1,108		7.5%
1950	1,057		−4.6%
1960	955		−9.6%
1970	1,138		19.2%
1980	1,587		39.5%
1990	1,883		18.7%
2000	2,109		12.0%
2010	2,371		12.4%
2020	2,406		1.5%
U.S. Decennial Census

As of the census of 2000, there were 2,109 people, 823 households, and 609 families residing in the town. The population density was 52.1 inhabitants per square mile (20.1/km^{2}). There were 1,038 housing units at an average density of 25.7 per square mile (9.9/km^{2}). The racial makeup of the town was 98.20% White, 0.38% African American, 0.14% Native American, 0.05% Asian, 0.05% Pacific Islander, 0.05% from other races, and 1.14% from two or more races. Hispanic or Latino of any race were 0.19% of the population.

There were 823 households, out of which 33.7% had children under the age of 18 living with them, 61.7% were married couples living together, 7.7% had a female householder with no husband present, and 26.0% were non-families. 20.5% of all households were made up of individuals, and 7.4% had someone living alone who was 65 years of age or older. The average household size was 2.55 and the average family size was 2.90.

In the town, the population was spread out, with 24.3% under the age of 18, 6.2% from 18 to 24, 28.2% from 25 to 44, 28.6% from 45 to 64, and 12.7% who were 65 years of age or older. The median age was 40 years. For every 100 females, there were 100.5 males. For every 100 females age 18 and over, there were 98.8 males.

The median income for a household in the town was $47,093, and the median income for a family was $52,212. Males had a median income of $33,074 versus $25,927 for females. The per capita income for the town was $21,627. About 4.5% of families and 5.7% of the population were below the poverty line, including 7.6% of those under age 18 and 6.3% of those age 65 or over.

== Gallery ==
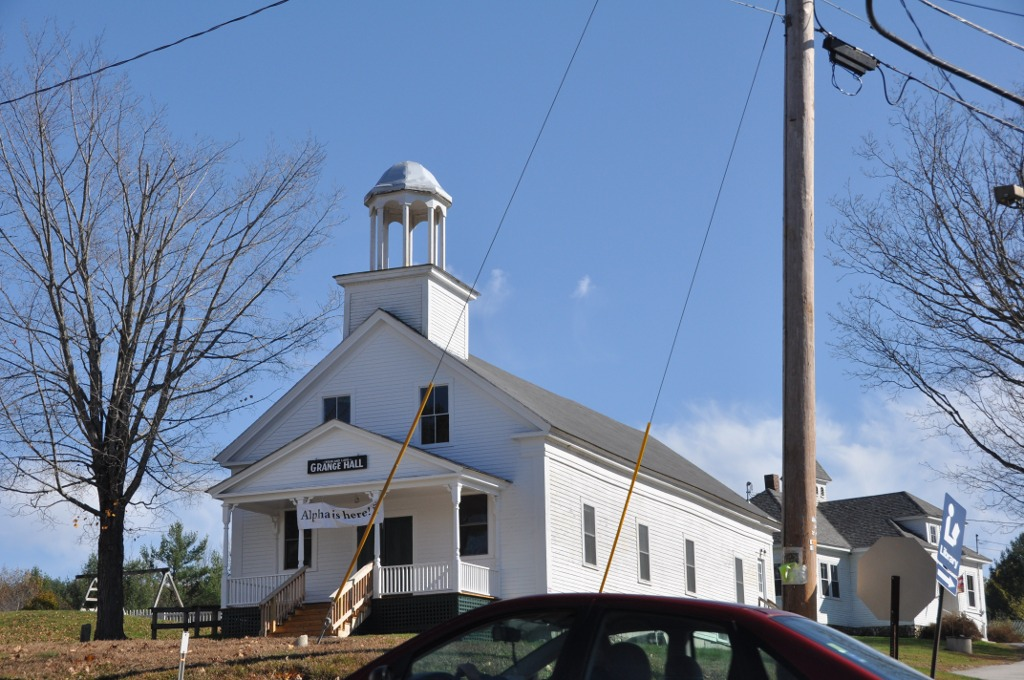
The Grange Hall in East Andover

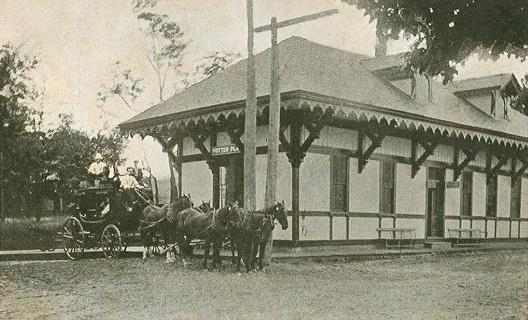
Potter Place Railroad Station in 1906

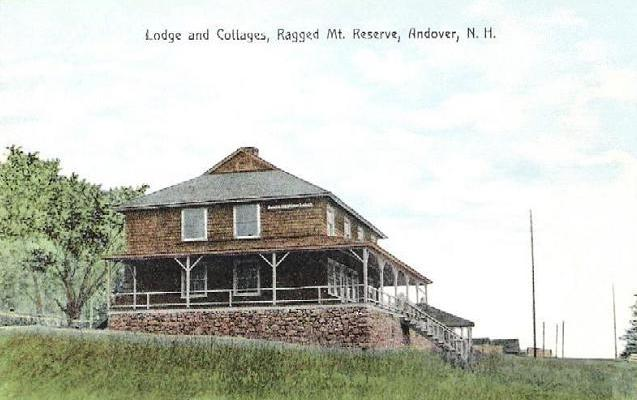
Lodge & cottages, Ragged Mountain Reserve, c. 1920

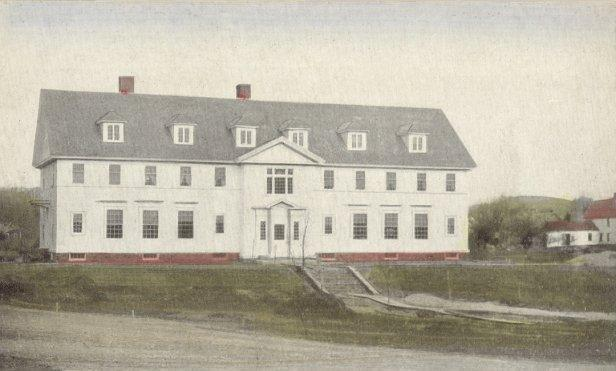
Carey House, Proctor Academy, c. 1915

== Notable people ==
- Nahum Josiah Bachelder (1854–1934), 49th governor of New Hampshire
- Jacob Bailey Moore (1797–1853), founder and first librarian of New Hampshire Historical Society
- Richard Potter (1783–1835), magician, hypnotist, ventriloquist

== Sites of interest ==
- Northern Rail Trail
- Potter Place Railroad Station, with the Andover Historical Society Museum
