= Rick Potter =

American gridiron football player (born 1938)

Profile
- Position: Halfback

Personal information
- Born: March 10, 1936 (age 90); Milwaukee, Wisconsin, U.S.
- Listed height: 5 ft 10 in (1.78 m)
- Listed weight: 193 lb (88 kg)

Career history
- 1957: Toronto Argonauts
- 1958–1962: Winnipeg Blue Bombers

Awards and highlights
- 4× Grey Cup champion (1958, 1959, 1961, 1962)

Rick Potter (born March 10, 1936) is an American former professional football player who played for the Winnipeg Blue Bombers and Toronto Argonauts. He won the Grey Cup with Winnipeg in 1958, 1959, 1961 and 1962. He played junior football in Toronto previously.
