= Northern Rail Trail =

Rail trail from Lebanon to Boscawen, New Hampshire, USA

Coordinates: 43°39′01″N 72°05′21″W

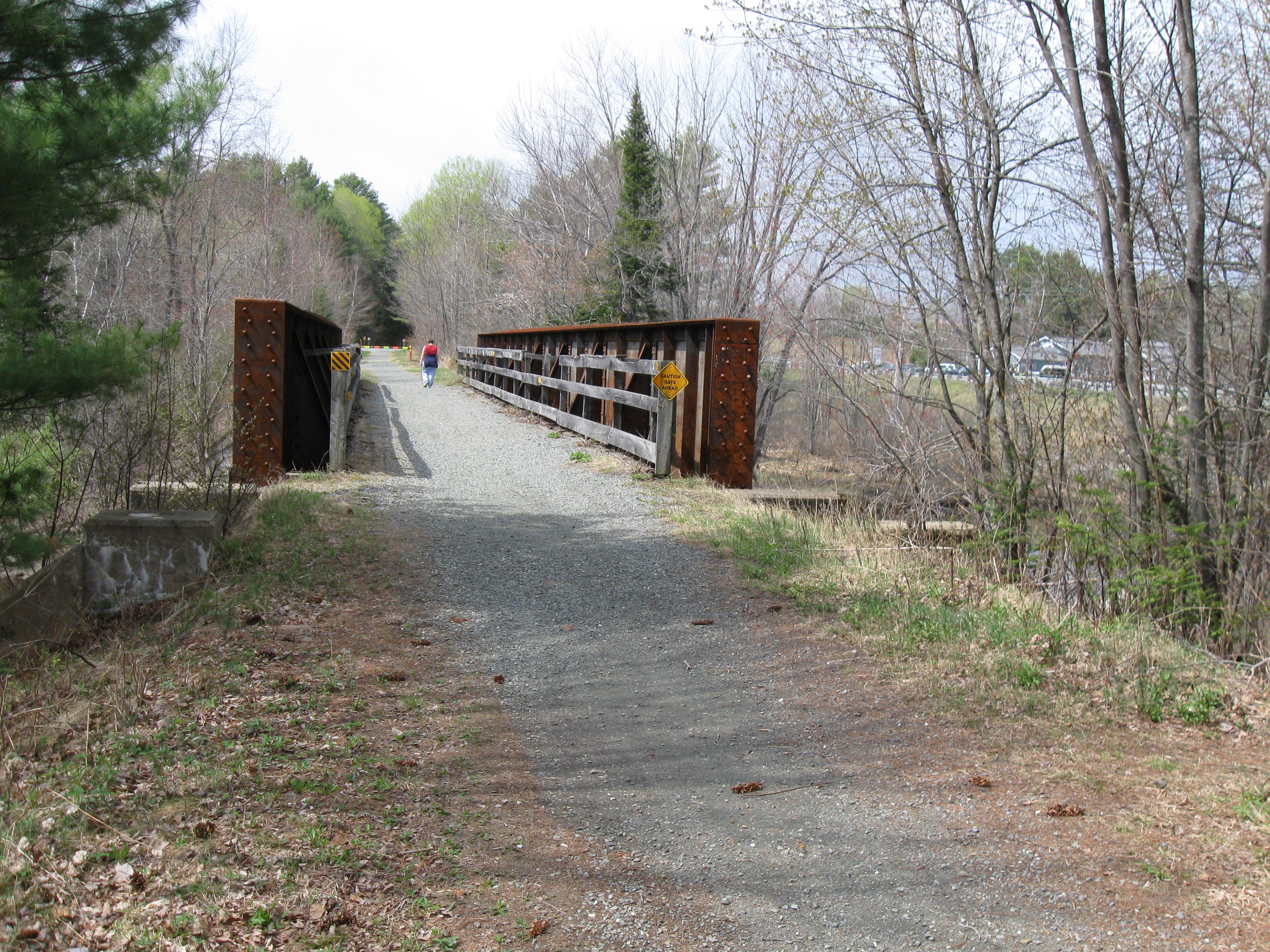
- The Northern Rail Trail crossing the Mascoma River between Enfield and Canaan, NH
- Length: 58 miles (93 km)
- Location: New Hampshire

The Northern Recreational Rail Trail, also known as the Northern Rail Trail, is a 58-mile (93 km) multi-use rail trail in western New Hampshire, USA, running from Lebanon to Boscawen. It uses the right-of-way of the Boston and Maine Railroad's former Northern Line, which was acquired by the State of New Hampshire in 1996. The trail is managed by the New Hampshire Bureau of Trails.

== History ==
The Northern Railroad built this line from Concord to White River Junction, Vermont, in 1847. The Boston-based investors were one of three groups in a race to connect with a line coming up the Connecticut River valley, and thus on to Quebec. Daniel Webster spoke at the ribbon-cutting in Lebanon, "It is altogether new. The world has seen nothing like it before." Not in attendance—by choice—among the 1,200 at the inauguration of the "steam highway" were any of the Shaker community from nearby Enfield. The Shakers had worked a deal with the railroad to relocate its proposed corridor to the opposite side of Mascoma Lake from their colony, while getting a bridge to its depot. A stock purchase and the naming of a locomotive The Shaker sealed the bargain. In 1887, the company was acquired by the Boston and Maine Railroad (B&M).

Traffic was heavy to Quebec ports on the St. Lawrence River for both immigrants and freight to Europe. Trains ran from Boston to White River Junction with continuing service north into Canada, via the Central Vermont Railway to Montreal, and the B&M to Newport, Vermont from where Quebec Central Railway trains would go to Sherbrooke and ultimately Quebec City. One train to Montreal was still running in the 1960s.

Passenger service ceased in 1965, and freight traffic in the early 1970s. The line was used by the Freedom Train in 1975 and one last time in 1982 when the B&M line along the Connecticut River was blocked after a derailment in Brattleboro. After formal abandonment by the B&M, the State of New Hampshire purchased 59 miles (95 km) of the corridor in 1995 from Boscawen to Mile 140.00 in Lebanon. Several years later, the state acquired the last two miles (3.2 km) to White River Junction, to include the large Westboro Yard.

After 13 years of work, 23 miles (37 km) from the trailhead in downtown Lebanon to the county line in Grafton were completed for year-round use in 2009 by the Grafton County Friends of the Northern Rail Trail. The volunteers in Merrimack County began redevelopment in Andover c. 2000, working first west and then east year by year. In 2010, a major surfacing project between Potter Place depot and the Danbury town garage connected the two counties, creating the longest rail trail in New Hampshire.

The Northern Railroad corridor was part of a Boston-Montreal High Speed Rail Study in 2003.

== See also ==
- Canaan train wreck, which occurred on the Boston and Maine Railroad between Canaan and West Canaan in 1907, along what is now the Northern Rail Trail
- List of rail trails in the United States
