= New London (CDP), New Hampshire =

Census-designated place in New Hampshire, United States

New London, New Hampshire
- Census-designated place
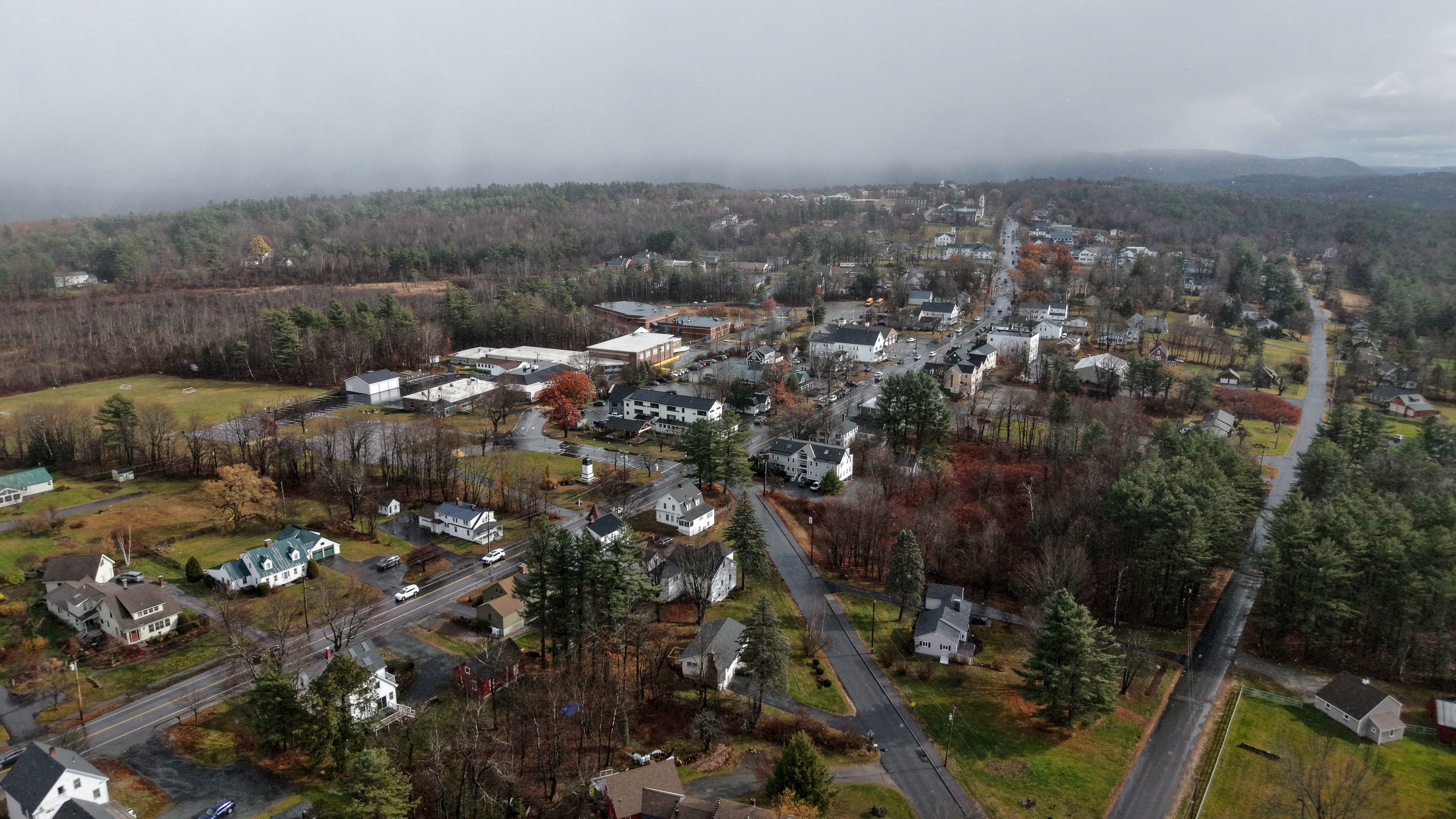
- New London, NH, from the northwest

- Location within New Hampshire Location within the United States
- Coordinates: 43°25′12″N 71°59′32″W
- Country: United States
- State: New Hampshire
- County: Merrimack
- Town: New London

Area
  - Total: 1.11 sq mi (2.88 km^{2})
  - Land: 1.11 sq mi (2.88 km^{2})
  - Water: 0 sq mi (0.00 km^{2})
- Elevation: 1,286 ft (392 m)

Population (2020)
  - Total: 1,266
  - Density: 1,139.9/sq mi (440.11/km^{2})
- Time zone: UTC-5 (Eastern (EST))
  - Summer (DST): UTC-4 (EDT)
- ZIP code: 03257
- Area code: 603
- FIPS code: 33-52020
- GNIS feature ID: 2629733

New London is a census-designated place (CDP) and the primary village in the town of New London, New Hampshire, United States. The population of the CDP was 1,266 at the 2020 census, out of 4,400 in the entire town. The CDP includes the campus of Colby–Sawyer College.

== Geography ==
The CDP occupies the central part of the town of New London, extending northwest to County Road and southeast past Squires Lane but not as far as Ridgeview Road/Quail Run. To the north the CDP extends beyond Seamans Road but not as far as Birch Acres Road, while to the south the CDP reaches to Lion Brook, south of Balsam Acres.

New Hampshire Route 114 is Main Street through the village, leading northwest 13 miles (21 km) to Grantham and south 12 miles (19 km) to Bradford. Interstate 89 passes 2 miles (3 km) southwest of the CDP, with access from Exits 11 and 12.

According to the U.S. Census Bureau, the New London CDP has a total area of 1.1 square miles (2.9 km^{2}), of which 1.2 acres (4,986 m^{2}), or 0.17%, are water. The CDP occupies a wide ridgetop which forms a watershed divide. The southwestern side of the CDP drains toward Lion Brook, a headwater of the Lane River in neighboring Sutton, which is part of the Warner River watershed, while the northeastern side drains to Pleasant Lake, the outlet of which is a tributary of the Blackwater River. Both the Warner and the Blackwater River are part of the Contoocook River watershed, leading east to the Merrimack River.

== Demographics ==
Historical population
Census	Pop.	Note	%±
2010	1,403		—
2020	1,266		−9.8%
U.S. Decennial Census

As of the census of 2010, there were 1,403 people, 309 households, and 130 families residing in the CDP. There were 342 housing units, of which 33, or 9.6%, were vacant. The racial makeup of the CDP was 93.8% white, 2.8% African American, 0.1% Native American, 1.6% Asian, 0.1% Pacific Islander, 0.2% some other race, and 1.4% from two or more races. 2.3% of the population were Hispanic or Latino of any race.

Of the 309 households in the CDP, 12.9% had children under the age of 18 living with them, 34.6% were headed by married couples living together, 5.5% had a female householder with no husband present, and 57.9% were non-families. 49.2% of all households were made up of individuals, and 32.0% were someone living alone who was 65 years of age or older. The average household size was 1.80, and the average family size was 2.51. 846 residents (60.6% of the CDP population) lived in group quarters such as dormitories or nursing facilities.

4.8% of residents in the CDP were under the age of 18, 63.8% were from age 18 to 24, 5.3% were from 25 to 44, 10.8% were from 45 to 64, and 15.2% were 65 years of age or older. The median age was 20.9 years. For every 100 females, there were 55.0 males. For every 100 females age 18 and over, there were 53.2 males.

For the period 2011–15, the estimated median annual income for a household was $31,985, and the median income for a family was $68,950. The per capita income for the CDP was $18,052.
