= Kearsarge Regional High School =

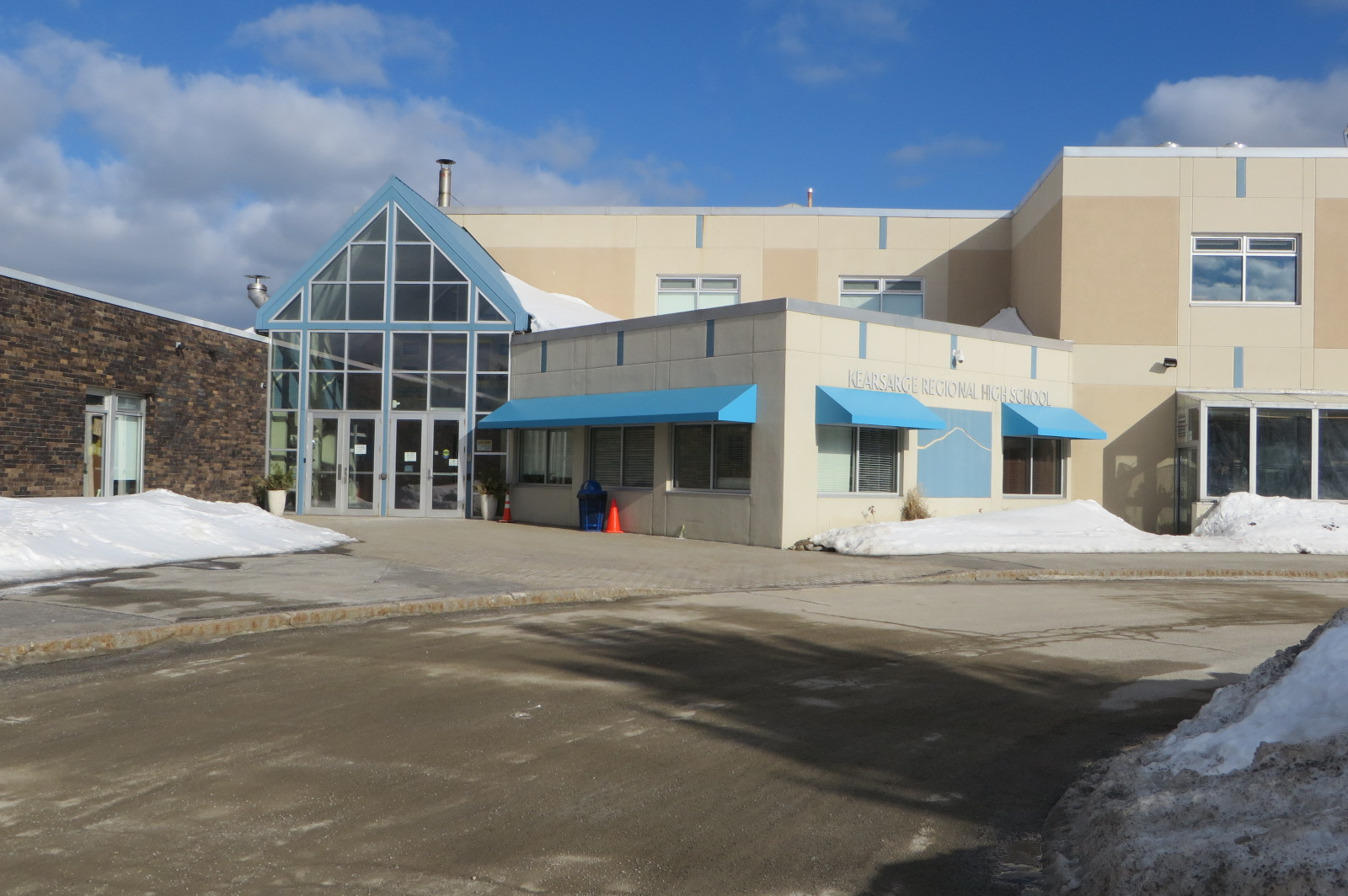

Location
- 457 North Road; North Sutton, New Hampshire 03260; United States; 43°20′55″N 71°54′15″W

Information
- Other name: KRHS
- Type: Public high school
- School district: Kearsarge Regional School District SAU 65
- NCES School ID: 330404000193
- Principal: Charles Langille
- Teaching staff: 50.40 (on an FTE basis)
- Grades: 9–12
- Enrollment: 534 (2017-2018)
- Student to teacher ratio: 10.60
- Colors: Royal Blue and Gold
- Mascot: Cougar
- Website: www.kearsarge.org/high-school

Kearsarge Regional High School (KRHS) is a public high school in North Sutton, New Hampshire, United States. It is part of the Kearsarge Regional School District SAU 65, and serves students from the towns of Bradford, Warner, Sutton, New London, Newbury, Springfield and Wilmot.

The current principal at the high school is Charles Langille.

Sports at the high school include softball, baseball, soccer, football, cross country, track, field hockey, lacrosse, rugby, golf, tennis, basketball, swimming, ice hockey, cheerleading, Nordic and alpine skiing, wrestling, lacrosse, dance team, a special needs basketball team, fishing, and a new volleyball team. The school colors are royal blue and gold, and the mascot is a cougar.
