= Matthew Harvey House =

Historic house in New Hampshire, United States

- U.S. National Register of Historic Places
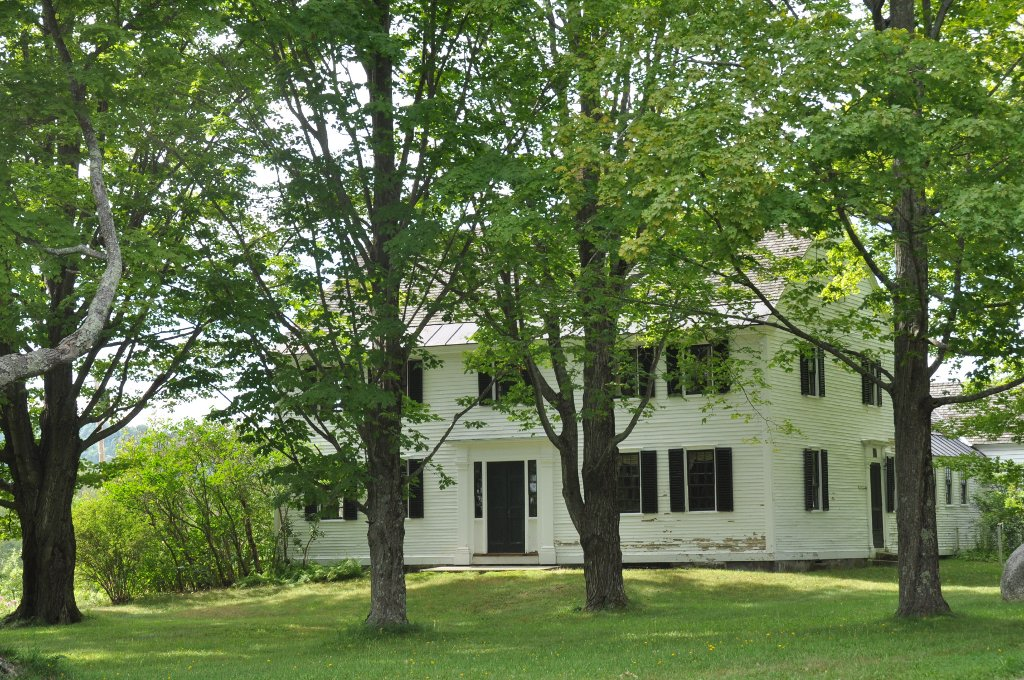

- Location within New Hampshire Location within the United States
- Location: west side of Harvey Rd., 0.25 mi. north of junction with Keyser St., Sutton, New Hampshire
- Coordinates: 43°22′22″N 71°57′22″W
- Area: 1 acre (0.40 ha)
- Built: 1784
- Architectural style: Georgian, Federal
- NRHP reference No.: 92001082
- Added to NRHP: September 4, 1992

The Matthew Harvey House is a historic house on Harvey Street in North Sutton, New Hampshire. Also known as the Harvey Homestead, the house is the centerpiece of Muster Field Farm, a working farm museum. Built in 1784, it is a prominent local example of Federal period architecture, and the homestead of a politically powerful family. The house was listed on the National Register of Historic Places in 1992.

== Architectural Description ==
The Matthew Harvey House is located in northern Sutton, in a rural setting on the west side of Harvey Road. It is part of a larger farm property that includes several agricultural buildings, which are located on both sides of the road. The house is set near the top of a ridge, from which views extend over the farm fields. It is a 2 1/2-story wood-frame structure with a side-gable roof, clapboarded exterior, and central chimney. It is oriented with its main facade facing roughly south, and a secondary side elevation toward the road. The main facade is five bays wide, with a center entrance. The entry is flanked by unusual sidelight windows which include a sliding sash, with pilasters outside rising to an entablature. Windows are set in rectangular openings with delicate Federal moulding, the second-story windows smaller than those on the first floor.

This elegant Federal-style wood-frame house was built in 1784, at a time when Harvey Street was a major north–south thoroughfare. Matthew Harvey, who had settled the land in 1772, built this house, from which he operated a tavern that may have been the first in Sutton. At his death in 1799 he was the largest landowner in town. The heavy frame of the house suggests it may have been built by someone more experienced in building larger wood-frame buildings such as meeting houses; Harvey's cousin John is known to have engaged in this business, and may have been the builder of this house.

== History ==
After Matthew Harvey died in 1799, his firstborn son Jonathan Harvey became the primary resident of the house. Both Jonathan Harvey and his younger brother Matthew Harvey served in the New Hampshire legislature and the United States Congress. In 1820, Jonathan stood as President of the New Hampshire Senate while his brother Matthew was Speaker of the House. The site where the Matthew Harvey House stands is currently called Muster Field Farm because of the military musters that took place on the property between 1787 and 1851. Musters were politically and socially important events: hundreds of men would gather with their regiment for military inspection, often bringing their wives and children. Vendors and musicians would arrive as well, generating a country fair atmosphere. During these occasions, the ballroom of the Matthew Harvey House would be used for entertaining the officers of the regiment. The house remained in the Harvey family for eight generations, until the Bristol family of Massachusetts purchased the property in 1941. Robert S. Bristol created the Muster Field Farm Museum, preserving the Matthew Harvey Home for future generations, with the caveat that the property always remain a working farm.

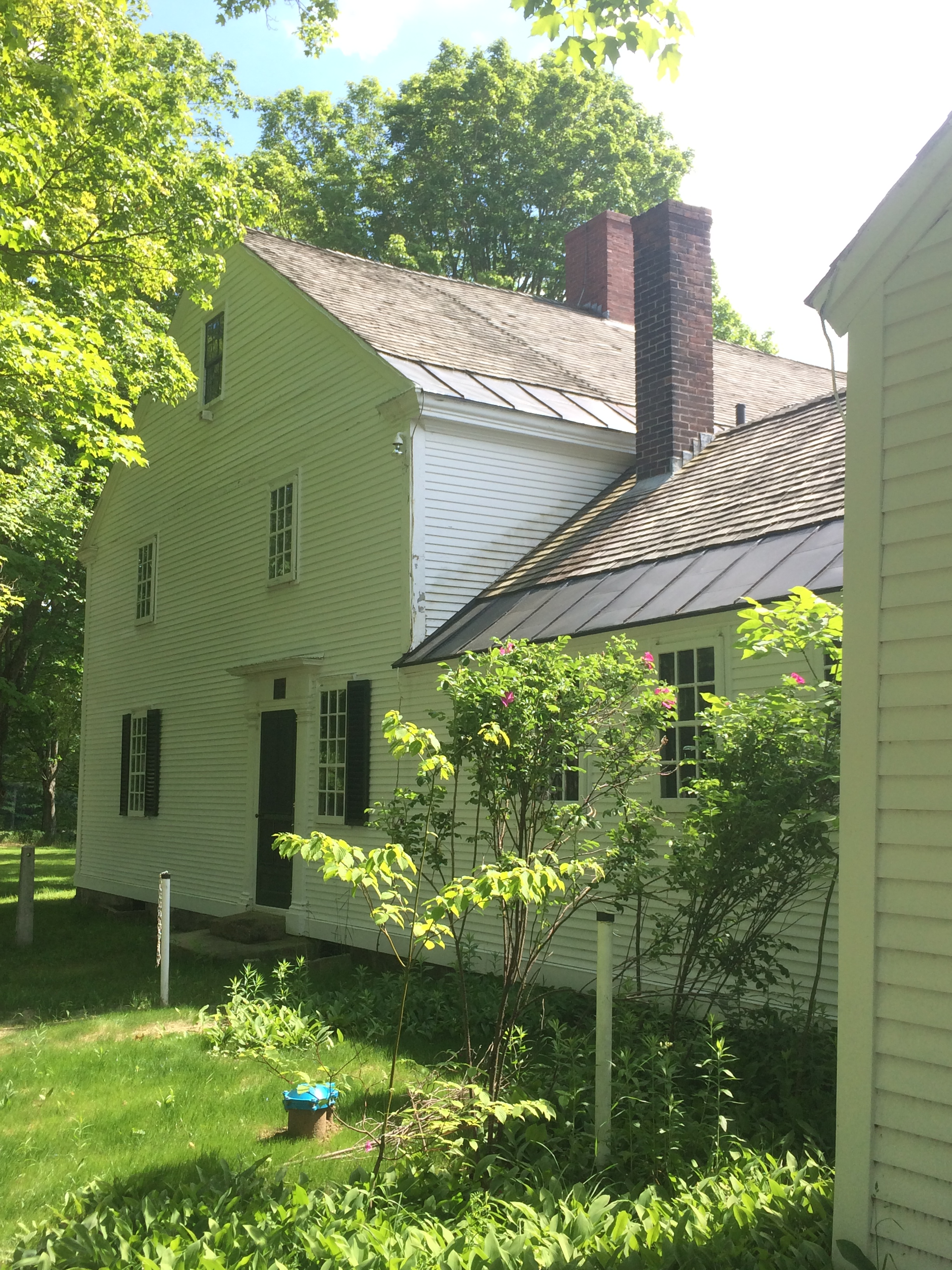
Front of Matthew Harvey House

== See also ==
- National Register of Historic Places listings in Merrimack County, New Hampshire
