= Charles D. Wells =

American politician

Charles D. Wells (November 3, 1849 – died) was an American newspaperman and politician.

Wells was born on November 3, 1849, in Sutton, New Hampshire, the son of James and Sarah Wells. His family relocated to Wisconsin in 1856, settling at Stoughton. Together with his brother James A. Wells (1841–1920), Charles D. Wells founded the Tomah Journal in Tomah, Wisconsin in 1867. He married Alice Asenath Maltbie in 1869; they had one child together (Lotta Wells Clark, 1875–1934) and later divorced in Colorado in 1879.

Wells was a member of the Wisconsin State Assembly during the 1876 session. Wells represented the 2nd District of Monroe County, Wisconsin. He was a Democrat.

Wells was arrested in 1883 in Oshkosh, Wisconsin on suspicion of being a "circus follower" and vagrant. He was jailed for several days until he was able to prove his identity.
