= Aaron Matson =

American politician (1770–1855)

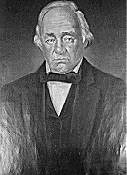
Aaron Matson

Aaron Matson (1770 – July 18, 1855) was a United States representative from New Hampshire. He was born in Plymouth, Massachusetts. He moved to Cheshire County, New Hampshire, where he was the county judge of probate.

Matson was a member of the New Hampshire House of Representatives 1806–1808, 1810–1814, 1817, and 1818, and a member of the Executive Council 1819–1821. He was elected as a Democratic-Republican to the Seventeenth Congress and reelected as an Adams-Clay Republican to the Eighteenth Congress (March 4, 1821 – March 3, 1825). After leaving Congress, he was again a member of the New Hampshire House of Representatives in 1827 and 1828. He died in Newport, Vermont in 1855.

His granddaughter Ann Matson was the first wife of the New Hampshire lawyer and congressman Edmund Burke.

== Sources ==
- United States Congress. "Aaron Matson (id: M000247)". Biographical Directory of the United States Congress.
- Aaron Matson (1770–1855)

U.S. House of Representatives
Preceded by Joseph Buffum, Jr.	Member of the U.S. House of Representatives from New Hampshire's at-large congressional district 1821–1825	Succeeded by Jonathan Harvey
