= May C. Jones =

American Baptist minister (born 1842)

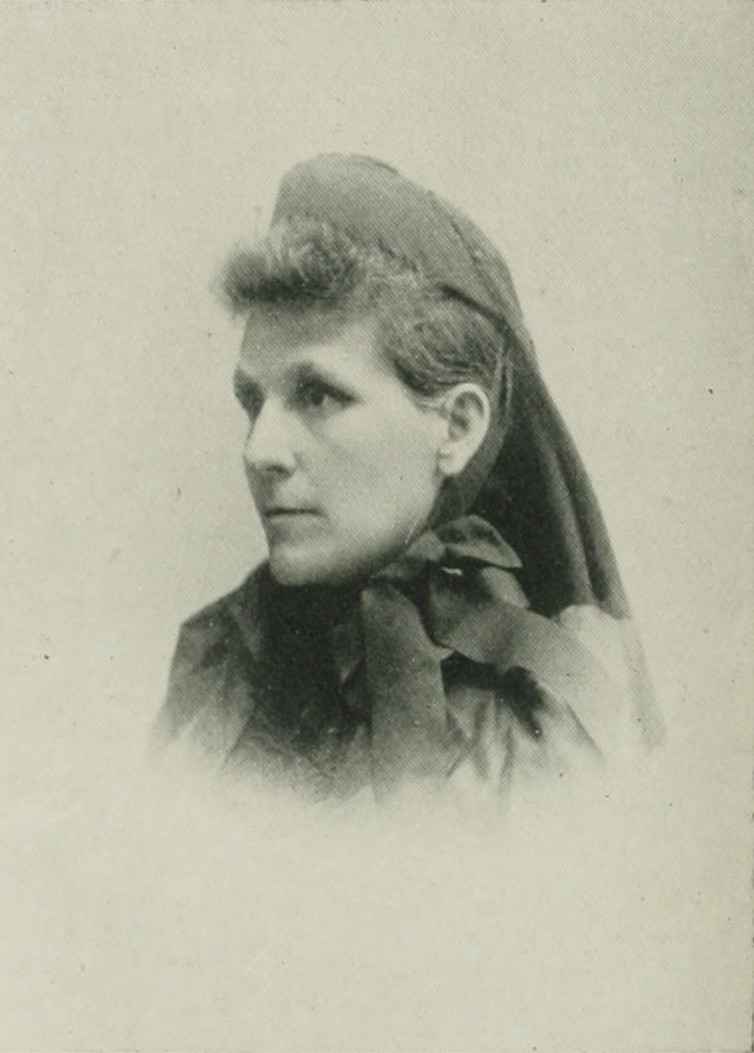
May C. Jones in Woman of the Century (1893)

May C. Jones (born November 5, 1842 – ?) was a 19th-century American Baptist minister and the first woman to be ordained in the Triennial Convention (American Baptist Churches USA). Her ordination in 1882 marked a significant milestone in the history of women in ministry. Despite facing significant scrutiny and opposition, Jones had an extremely successful career as a minister.

== Early life and move to the Pacific Coast ==
Born to an English father and Scottish mother in Sutton, New Hampshire, Jones became a schoolteacher at thirteen. In 1867, she and her husband moved to California, remaining there until 1880.

After relocating to Seattle, Washington, in 1880, Jones preached her first sermon at First Baptist Church of Seattle. The church then gave her the license to preach, and that year she began serving as an interim pastor. Following this the church proposed her ordination, sparking one of the most controversial moments in Baptist history.

== Ordination and controversy ==
On July 9, 1882, during an assembly of the Baptist Association of Puget Sound, Jones was ordained. However, the process was met with strong resistance. Critics accused the First Baptist Church of Seattle of bypassing proper protocols, as the ordination proposal was made while the church's pastor was away on a European tour. Furthermore, the First Baptist Church of Seattle had not filed a request of ordination prior to the association's assembly. Many opponents walked out of the assembly in protest, leaving only Jones' supporters to vote on the matter. As a result, Jones' ordination was approved due to the opposition not being present.

Much of the opposition did not recognize Jones' ordination as legitimate. One minister remarked, "This so-called ordination was not accepted on the North Pacific Coast, except among a very small per cent of the members of the churches. The author does not recall more than two ministers of prominence who sanctioned it as scriptural, and neither of them was a pastor. The ordination of a woman to work of the gospel ministry was held to be unscriptural." Jones' ordination was also controversial within the rest of the Northern Baptist Convention, especially with ministers on the East Coast.

== Ministerial career ==
Despite the opposition and claims of illegitimacy, Jones had a successful and prominent career as a minister. Following her ordination, May Jones served as the interim pastor of the First Baptist Church of Seattle. In the year following her ordination, Rev. Jones began planting churches, and throughout her career she founded several churches and built two sanctuaries. Jones pastored six churches: Puyallup Baptist Church (1883–1884), Chehalis Baptist Church (1885–1887), Centralia Baptist Church (1886–1887), Olympia Baptist Church (1886), Spokane Falls Baptist Church (1888–1889), and First Baptist Church of Spokane (1891). Often Jones would serve "two or three [churches] simultaneously" as its pastor, "preaching, baptizing, and performing weddings." Her longest pastoral post was at the second-largest church in Washington, the First Baptist Church of Spokane. During her four-year tenure, the church grew considerably until her retirement in 1892.

In addition to pastoring churches, she was an extremely popular evangelist. Furthermore, she held leadership positions in local associations, the state convention, and organized local churches. Jones also founded Grace Seminary, a now-defunct seminary, in Centralia, Washington.

== Later life and legacy ==
After pastoring the First Baptist Church of Spokane, Jones retired in 1892 to care for her ailing husband, who died later that year. Following his passing, she continued evangelistic work, often collaborating with her daughter, a gifted singer. Together, they achieved great success in spreading their message of faith.
