= South Sutton, New Hampshire =

Unincorporated community in New Hampshire, United States

- Unincorporated community
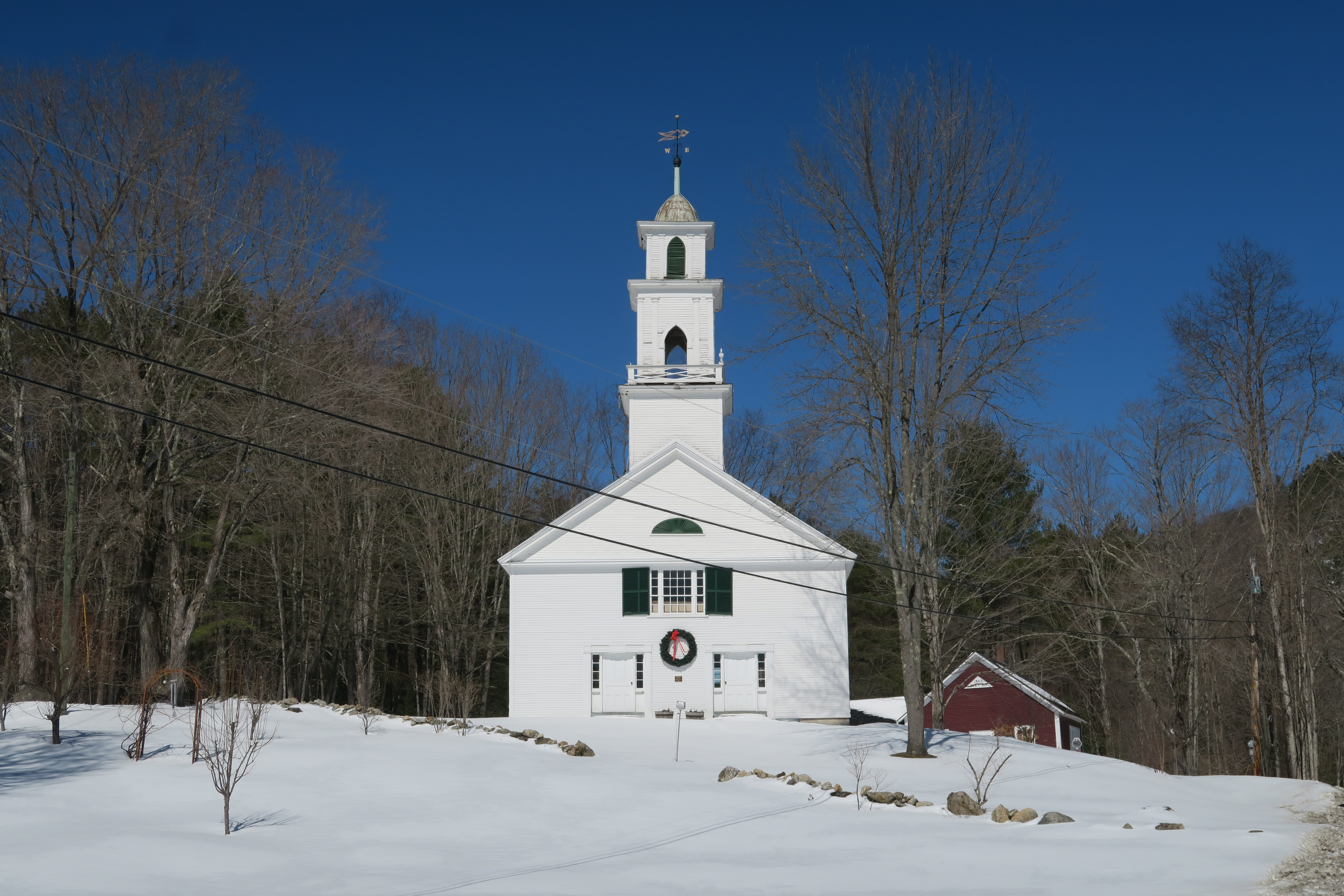
- South Sutton Meeting House

- Location within New Hampshire Location within the United States
- Coordinates: 43°19′03″N 71°56′02″W
- Country: United States
- State: New Hampshire
- County: Merrimack
- Town: Sutton
- Elevation: 722 ft (220 m)
- Time zone: UTC-5 (Eastern (EST))
  - Summer (DST): UTC-4 (EDT)
- ZIP code: 03273
- Area code: 603
- GNIS feature ID: 870061

South Sutton is an unincorporated community in the town of Sutton in Merrimack County, New Hampshire, United States. It is located along New Hampshire Route 114, which leads north through Sutton Mills and North Sutton into the town of New London, and south into the town of Bradford. South Sutton is located along the Lane River.

South Sutton has a separate ZIP code (03273) from other parts of the town of Sutton.

== Notable people ==
- John Sargent Pillsbury, founder of the Pillsbury flour milling business and three-time governor of Minnesota, born in South Sutton in 1828
