= Augusta Harvey Worthen =

American educator, author (1823-1910)

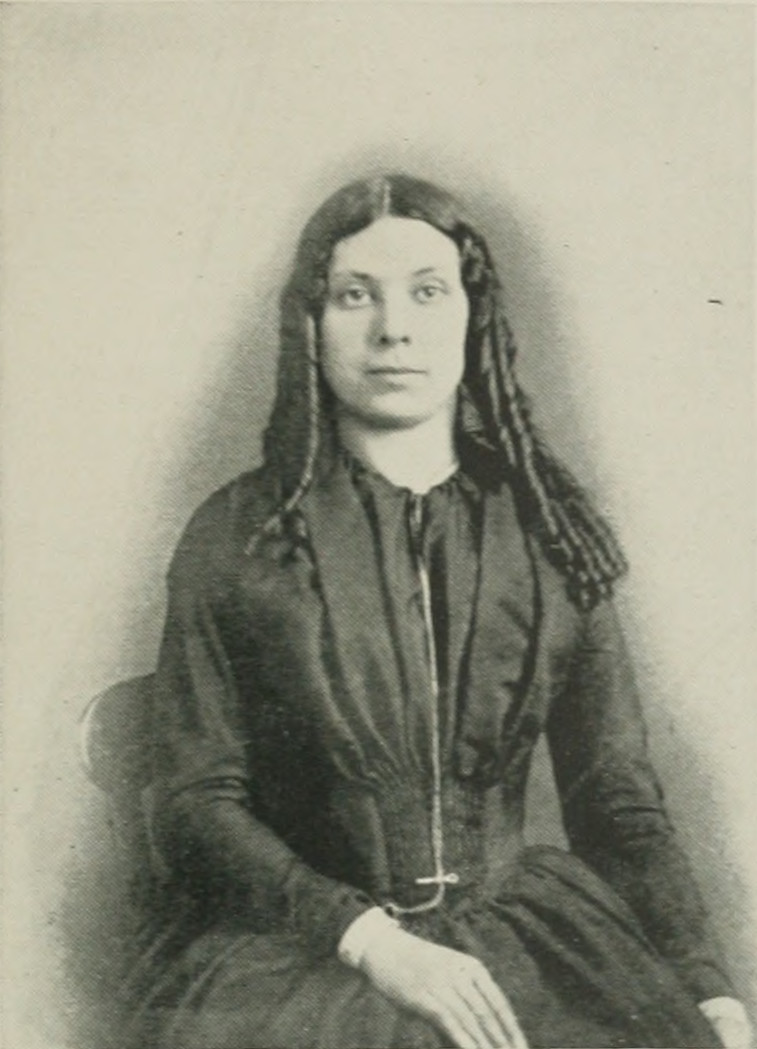
- Photo in A Woman of the Century
- Born: Augusta Harvey; September 27, 1823; Sutton, New Hampshire, U.S.
- Died: April 4, 1910 (aged 86); Tewksbury, Massachusetts, U.S.
- Occupations: Educator, author
- Spouse: Charles F. Worthen (m. 1855; died 1882)
- Relatives: Jonathan Harvey, Matthew Harvey
- Writing career
- Language: English
- Genres: History, poetry
- Notable works: The history of Sutton, New Hampshire

Augusta Harvey Worthen (née, Harvey; pen name, Augusta H. Worthen; September 27, 1823 – April 4, 1910) was an American educator and author of the long nineteenth century. She taught school, and wrote poetry and prose. Her greatest work was the history of her town, Sutton, published in two volumes in 1890; it was the first town history in the state of New Hampshire prepared by a woman.

== Early life and education ==
Augusta Harvey was born in Sutton, New Hampshire, September 27, 1823. She was the daughter of Colonel John and Sally (Greeley) Harvey. Her uncles were Jonathan Harvey, a Congressman; and Matthew Harvey, governor of New Hampshire. She was the a granddaughter of another Matthew Harvey who was one of the first settlers of Sutton. She was sister to yet another Matthew Harvey, of Newport, New Hampshire who became the co-editor of the New Hampshire Argus and Spectator and it was mainly through the aid of this brother that her literary efforts were first published.

When Augusta was eight years old, she went to live with her Uncle Matthew, in Hopkinton, New Hampshire, and remained there for six years, while attending the Hopkinton Academy.

== Career ==
Starting at the age of sixteen, Worthen taught in district schools for two years. For the following three years, she was employed at a Lowell, Massachusetts cotton factory, working for fourteen hours each day and pursuing her studies in the evenings at a select school. Her first article was printed during this time, in the Lowell Offering, a magazine for mill operatives. She then resumed teaching, and became a pupil-assistant in the Andover Academy, paying for her own tuition by instructing younger classes.

On February 15, 1855, (Note: Willard & Livermore give the marriage date as September 15, 1855.) she married, in Danvers, Massachusetts, Charles F. Worthen of Candia, New Hampshire. In 1858, she removed with him to Lynn, Massachusetts where he was engaged in manufacturing until his death in 1882, and where she continued to have her home nearly up to the time of her decease.

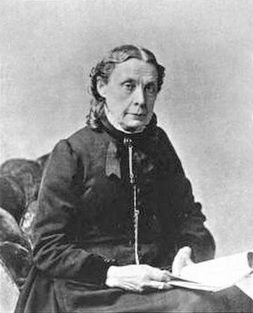
Augusta Harvey Worthen

After marriage, she worked to carry her share of their mutual burdens, but after a time, she engaged in study and composition, and wrote prose sketches and poems. The great work of Worthen's life was the preparation of a history of her native town, Sutton, extending to over eleven-hundred pages. After being engaged in its research for twenty years, it was published in 1891. It was the first New Hampshire town history prepared by a woman. Thereafter, she wrote articles of fiction. Worthen's poems of especial merit were included in New Hampshire Poets, Poets of America, Poets of Essex County, and several later collections, as well as by a portrait and biography in A Woman of the Century.

Worthen died at Tewksbury, Massachusetts, April 4, 1910.

== Selected works ==
- The history of Sutton, New Hampshire : consisting of the historical collections of Erastus Wadleigh, eds., and A. H. Worthen, compiled and arranged by Mrs. Augusta Harvey Worthen., 1890
