= Jonathan Harvey (politician) =

American politician (1780–1859)

Member of the U.S. House of Representatives from New Hampshire's At large district
- In office March 4, 1825 – March 3, 1831
- Preceded by: Aaron Matson
- Succeeded by: Joseph M. Harper

Member of the Executive Council of New Hampshire
- In office 1823–1825

President of the New Hampshire Senate
- In office 1817–1822
- Preceded by: William Badger
- Succeeded by: David L. Morrill

Member of the New Hampshire Senate
- In office 1816-1823

Member of the New Hampshire House of Representatives
- In office 1811-1816; 1831-1834; 1838-1840

Personal details
- Born: February 25, 1780 Sutton, New Hampshire, U.S.
- Died: August 23, 1859 (aged 79) North Sutton, New Hampshire, U.S.
- Resting place: North Sutton Cemetery, North Sutton, New Hampshire
- Party: Jacksonian
- Relations: Matthew Harvey, Augusta Harvey Worthen (niece)
- Occupation: Farmer; Politician

Jonathan Harvey (February 25, 1780 – August 23, 1859) was an American farmer and politician from New Hampshire. He served as a member of the United States House of Representatives and the New Hampshire House of Representatives in the early 1800s.

== Early life ==
Born in Sutton, New Hampshire, Harvey was the son of Matthew and Hannah (Hadley) Harvey. He was the brother of Matthew Harvey, a United States federal judge. He attended the common schools before engaging in agricultural pursuits.

== Career ==
He served as member of the New Hampshire House of Representatives from 1811 to 1816, 1831 to 1834, and 1838 to 1840. He served in the New Hampshire Senate from 1816 to 1823, and was president of the State Senate from 1817 to 1823. He was a member of the Executive Council of New Hampshire from 1823 to 1825.

Elected as a Jacksonian to the Nineteenth, Twentieth, and Twenty-first Congresses, Harvey served from March 4, 1825, to March 3, 1831. He was not a candidate for renomination in 1830, and retired to his farm at North Sutton, New Hampshire.

== Death ==
Harvey died on August 23, 1859 (age 79 years, 179 days) at North Sutton, New Hampshire. He is interred at North Sutton Cemetery in North Sutton, New Hampshire.

Political offices
Preceded by William Badger	President of the New Hampshire Senate; 1817-1822	Succeeded by David L. Morrill
U.S. House of Representatives
Preceded by Aaron Matson	Member of the U.S. House of Representatives from New Hampshire's at-large congressional district 1825-1831	Succeeded by Joseph M. Harper
