= Elkins, New Hampshire =

Unincorporated community in New Hampshire, United States

- Unincorporated community
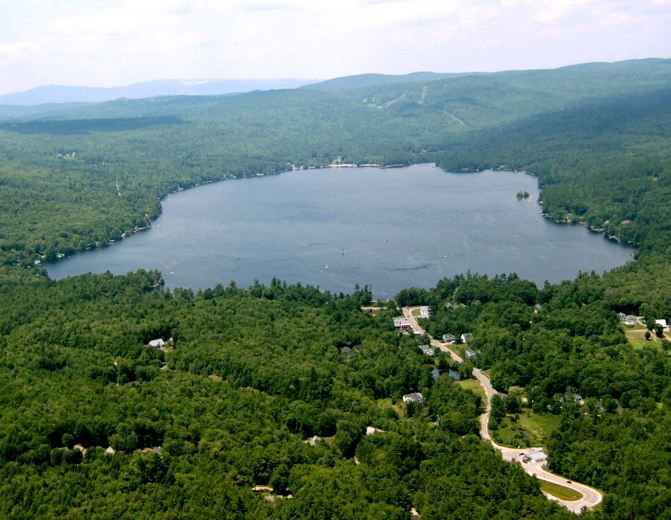
- Aerial view of Elkins (foreground) and Pleasant Lake

- Location within New Hampshire Location within the United States
- Coordinates: 43°25′15″N 71°56′14″W
- Country: United States
- State: New Hampshire
- County: Merrimack
- Town: New London
- Elevation: 810 ft (250 m)
- Time zone: UTC-5 (Eastern (EST))
  - Summer (DST): UTC-4 (EDT)
- ZIP code: 03233
- Area code: 603
- GNIS feature ID: 866776

Elkins is an unincorporated community in New London, Merrimack County, New Hampshire, United States. It is situated at the eastern end of Pleasant Lake. It is home to a public beach, public boat launch, auto repair garage, post office, church, veterinarian office, and alpaca farm. Also central to the community is the Hall of The American Legions and adjacent bandstand.

The village was originally called "Scythe Factory Village" or "Scytheville", because of the presence of a scythe works in the village, using the outflow from Pleasant Lake to power the equipment to manufacture this agricultural implement. The scythe works closed in 1889 and, in 1896, the village was renamed in honor of John P. Elkins, a physician who had served the community from 1875 to 1888.

== Scythe works ==
The scythe blade manufacturer in the village was founded in 1835 by Richard Messer, Joseph Phillips and Anthony Colby. Still in their twenties, Messer and Phillips had learned the business in Fitchburg, Massachusetts, while Colby provided the water rights but no capital.

All of the necessary iron, steel, and coal had to be hauled by oxen from the nearest railhead at Concord. In 1847, the Northern Railroad arrived in Potter Place, shortening the teamsters' trip by 25 miles (40 km).

The scythe works operated for over fifty years, employed almost a hundred workers, and shipped products around the United States, Canada, and parts of Europe. A dozen 3-ton grindstones and fourteen trip-hammers were powered by water running through a series of three dams and millponds. Among the many other mills sharing this power supply were a saw mill, shingle mill, grist mill, cider mill, hosiery mill, carding mill, and tannery.

In 1880, the New London Scythe Co. shipped over 120,000 scythe blades, 12,000 hay knives, and 6,000 axe blades.

By October 1888 the grinding and hammering were silenced, as the industry moved closer to raw materials and distribution centers, and as agriculture became more mechanized. Water power no longer offered a competitive advantage. The company's property, plant and equipment, which earlier had been valued at $150,000, was sold at auction for $9,650.

Within a year and a half, the village's population dropped from 300 to 75, and the area began a slow transition to other water-related enterprises: tourism and recreation.
