= Pleasant Lake (New London, New Hampshire) =

Lake in New Hampshire, United States

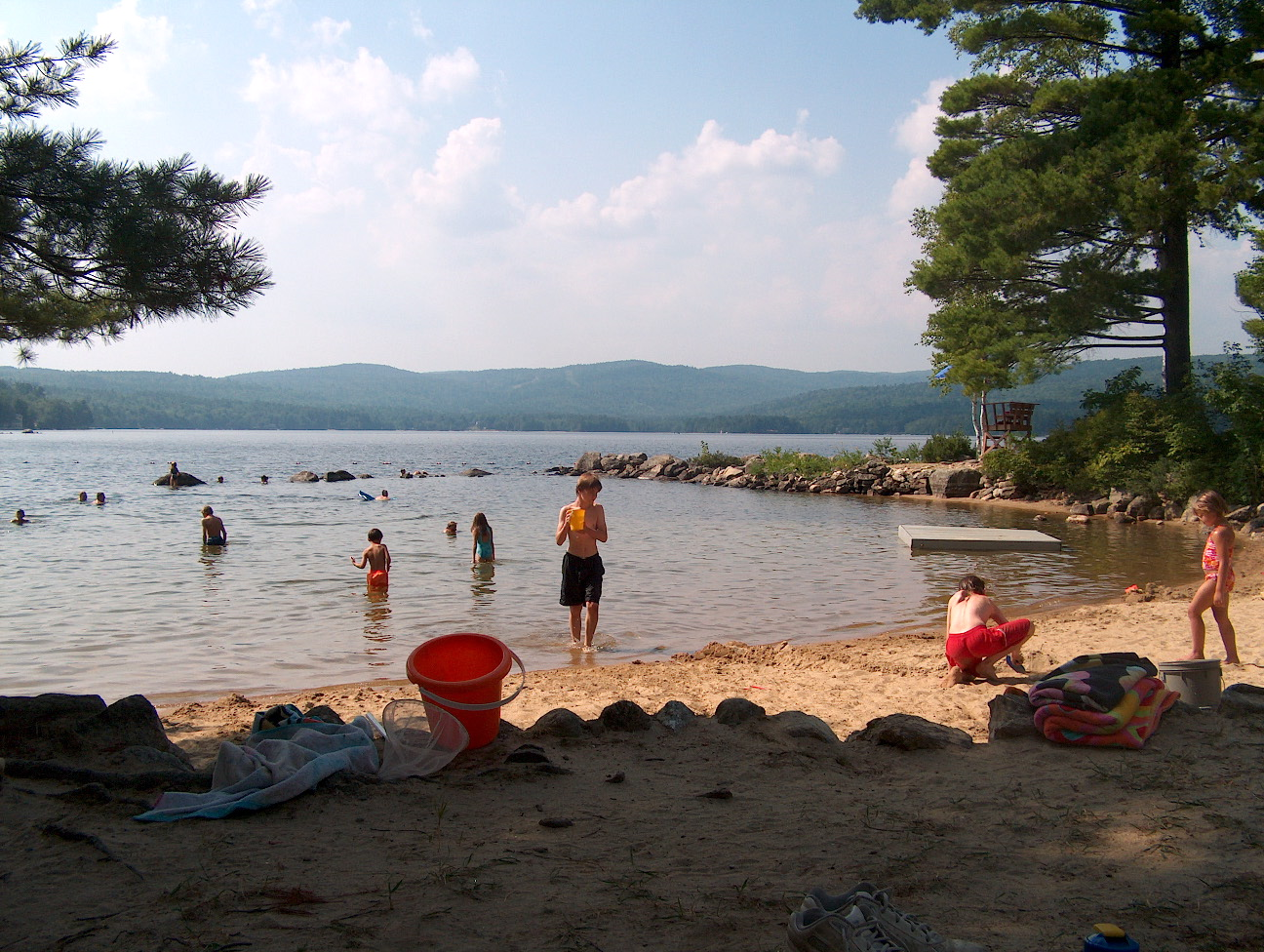
- Pleasant Lake at Elkins Beach

- Location within New Hampshire Location within the United States
- Location: Merrimack County, New Hampshire
- Coordinates: 43°25′33″N 71°57′14″W
- Primary inflows: Great Brook
- Primary outflows: Blackwater River
- Basin countries: United States
- Max. length: 1.8 miles (2.9 km)
- Max. width: 0.7 miles (1.1 km)
- Surface area: 602 acres (2.4 km^{2})
- Surface elevation: 805 feet (245 m)
- Islands: 1
- Settlements: Elkins (town of New London)

Pleasant Lake is a 602-acre (2.4 km^{2}) lake in the town of New London, Merrimack County, New Hampshire, United States. The village of Elkins is located at the east end of the lake, next to its outlet. Water from Pleasant Lake flows east to the Blackwater River, a tributary of the Contoocook River, and ultimately the Merrimack River.

== Fishing ==
The lake is classified as a cold- and warmwater fishery, with observed species including brook trout, landlocked salmon, smallmouth bass, chain pickerel, and horned pout. The state record landlocked salmon was caught in Pleasant Lake in 1914 (36", 18 lb, 8 oz).

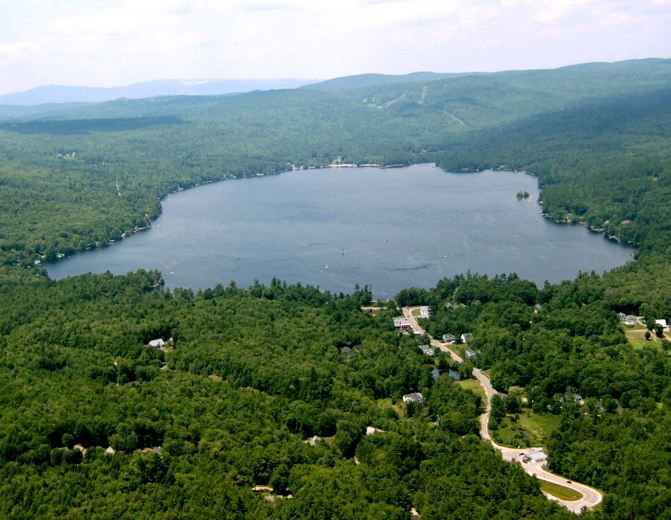
Aerial view of Pleasant Lake with village of Elkins in foreground

== Island ==
There is an island on the lake which on old maps has the name "Granite Friends Island" but is better known today as "Blueberry Island." It is a destination for boaters and picnickers.

== Beaches ==
Elkins Beach is a New London town beach, which, like the village of Elkins, is located near the outlet of Pleasant Lake. This beach is the primary swimming location on the lake for town residents and their families.

== See also ==
- List of lakes in New Hampshire
