= Lane River =

River in the United States of America

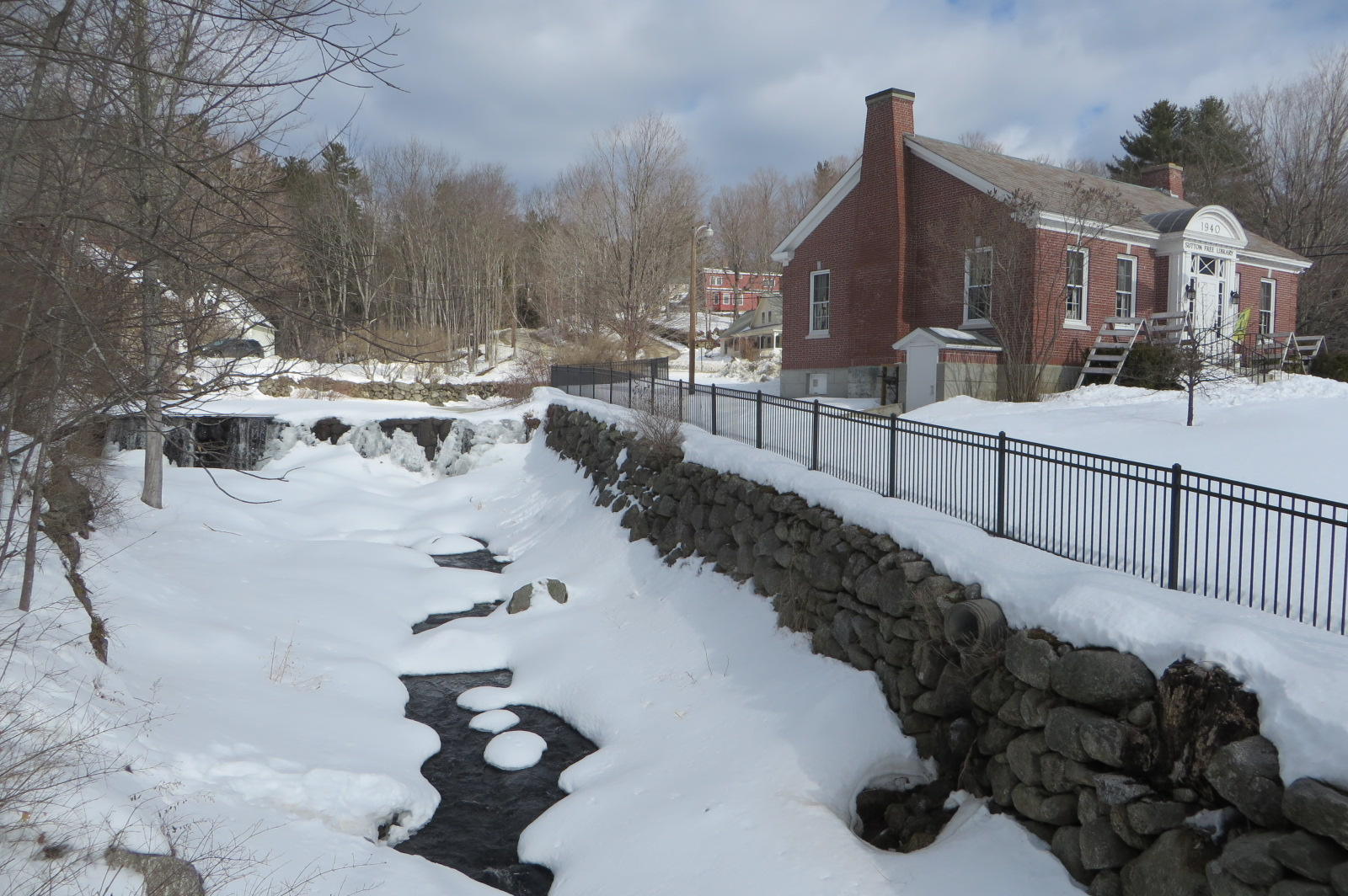
- The Lane River in the center of Sutton, NH

- Location within New Hampshire Location within the United States

Location
- Country: United States
- State: New Hampshire
- County: Merrimack
- Town: Sutton

Physical characteristics
- Source: Kezar Lake
  - location: North Sutton
  - coordinates: 43°21′43″N 71°56′29″W
  - elevation: 906 ft (276 m)
- Mouth: Warner River
  - location: Roby (Sutton)
  - coordinates: 43°17′19″N 71°53′19″W
  - elevation: 490 ft (150 m)
- Length: 8.5 mi (13.7 km)

Basin features
- Tributaries
  - left: Thistle Brook
  - right: Kings Brook

The Lane River is an 8.5-mile-long (13.7 km) stream in central New Hampshire in the United States. It is a tributary of the Warner River, part of the Contoocook River (and ultimately Merrimack River) watershed.

The Lane River begins at the outlet of Kezar Lake in the village of North Sutton. The river flows south through a broad wetland, incorporating the outflow of Gile Pond, then suddenly drops 140 feet (43 m) in 0.3 miles (0.5 km) to enter the village of Sutton. The river continues southeast through more wetlands and past the village of South Sutton, then becomes more rapid as it descends to the Warner River at the Sutton/Warner town line.

== See also ==
- List of rivers of New Hampshire
