= North Sutton, New Hampshire =

Unincorporated community in New Hampshire, United States

- Unincorporated community
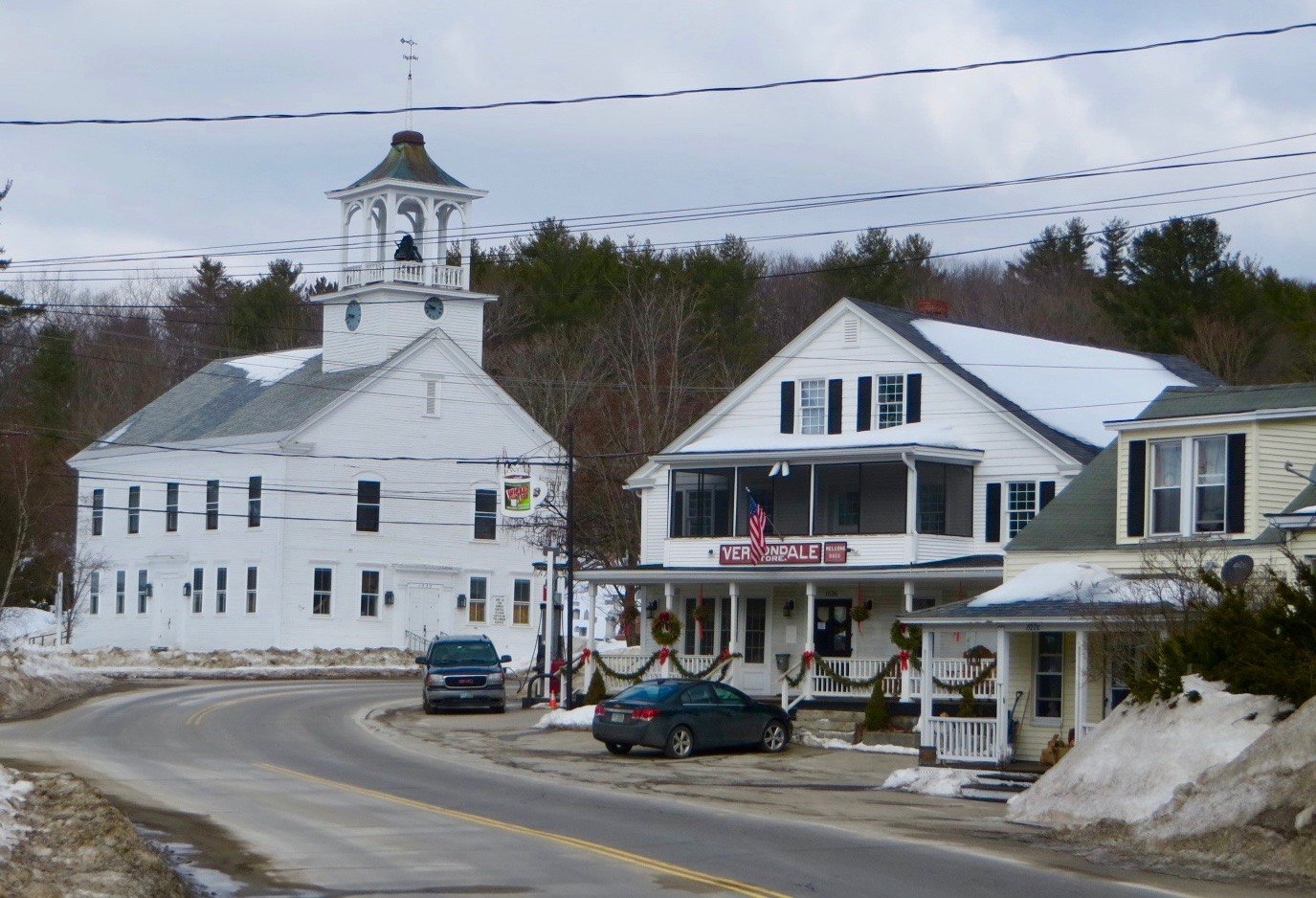

- Location within New Hampshire Location within the United States
- Coordinates: 43°21′50″N 71°56′22″W
- Country: United States
- State: New Hampshire
- County: Merrimack
- Town: Sutton
- Elevation: 915 ft (279 m)
- Time zone: UTC-5 (Eastern (EST))
  - Summer (DST): UTC-4 (EDT)
- ZIP code: 03260
- Area code: 603
- GNIS feature ID: 868818

North Sutton is an unincorporated community in the town of Sutton in Merrimack County, New Hampshire, United States. It is located at the eastern end of Kezar Lake, adjacent to Wadleigh State Park.

New Hampshire Route 114 passes through the village, leading north to New London and south to Sutton Village, South Sutton and Bradford. Interstate 89 passes just east of the village, which can be accessed from Exit 10.

North Sutton has a separate ZIP code (03260) from other parts of the town of Sutton.

== Sites of interest ==
Kezar Lake, with its 3-mile (5 km) loop of lightly traveled country roads, is a popular local destination for walkers, joggers, and dog walkers.

Muster Field Farm, a working farm and New Hampshire agricultural learning center and museum, is on Harvey Road 1 mile (1.6 km) northwest of the center of North Sutton.
