= Blackwater River (Contoocook River tributary) =

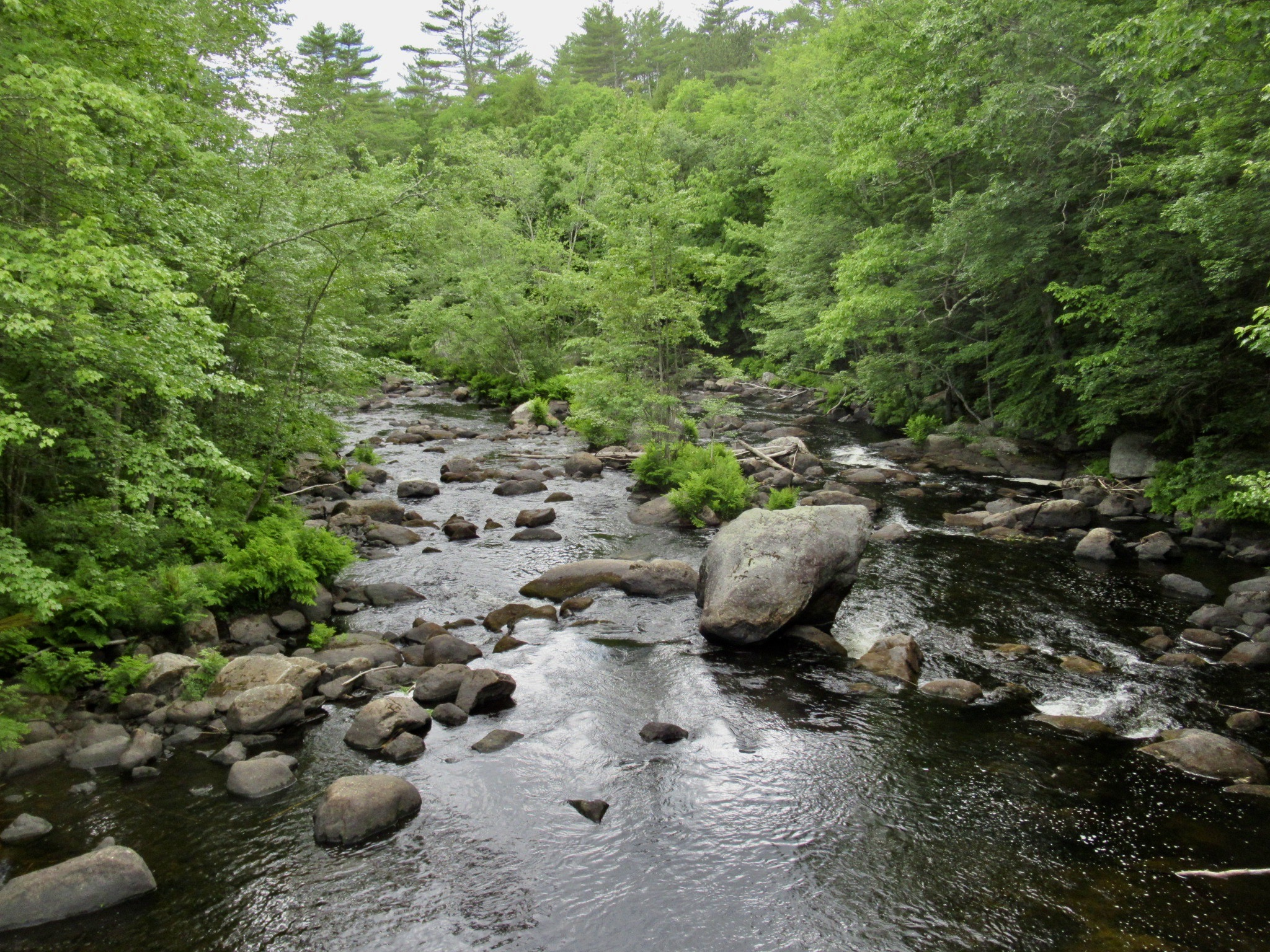
- The Blackwater at Tyler Road in Webster, NH

- Location within New Hampshire Location within the United States

Location
- Country: United States
- State: New Hampshire
- County: Merrimack
- Towns: Andover, Salisbury, Webster, Hopkinton

Physical characteristics
- Source: Cilleyville
  - location: Town of Andover
  - coordinates: 43°25′52″N 71°52′06″W
  - elevation: 644 ft (196 m)
- Mouth: Contoocook River
  - location: Hopkinton
  - coordinates: 43°14′47″N 71°40′47″W
  - elevation: 345 ft (105 m)
- Length: 37.5 mi (60.4 km)

Basin features
- Tributaries
  - left: Frazier Brook
  - right: Cascade Brook

The Blackwater River is a 37.5-mile-long (60.4 km) river located in central New Hampshire in the United States. It is a tributary of the Contoocook River, part of the Merrimack River watershed.

The Blackwater River is formed at Cilleyville, a village in the western part of the town of Andover, by the junction of two branch streams. Cascade Brook, the western branch, begins at Cascade Marsh in the northeast part of Sutton and flows northeast to Wilmot Flat, where it is joined by the outlet of Pleasant Lake of New London before continuing east to Cilleyville. Frazier Brook, the northern stream branch, rises just south of Danbury village and flows south parallel to Route 4, passing South Danbury, flowing through Eagle Pond in Wilmot and then through Bog Pond below West Andover, joining Cascade Brook just south of the outlet of Bog Pond. Kimpton Brook (formerly known as Quickwater Brook), flowing easterly through the village of Wilmot Center, is the primary tributary of Eagle Pond.

From its start at Cilleyville, the Blackwater River flows east through the town of Andover, passing the village of Potter Place. Beyond Andover village, the river continues to wind its way east, eventually turning south near the Blackwater Bays and dropping over rapids through the village of West Salisbury to the impoundment area of the Blackwater Dam in the town of Webster. Below the reservoir dam, the Blackwater encounters a short, intense whitewater stretch before flattening again for the final miles to the Contoocook in Hopkinton.

== See also ==
- List of rivers of New Hampshire
