= Sutton, New Hampshire =

- Town
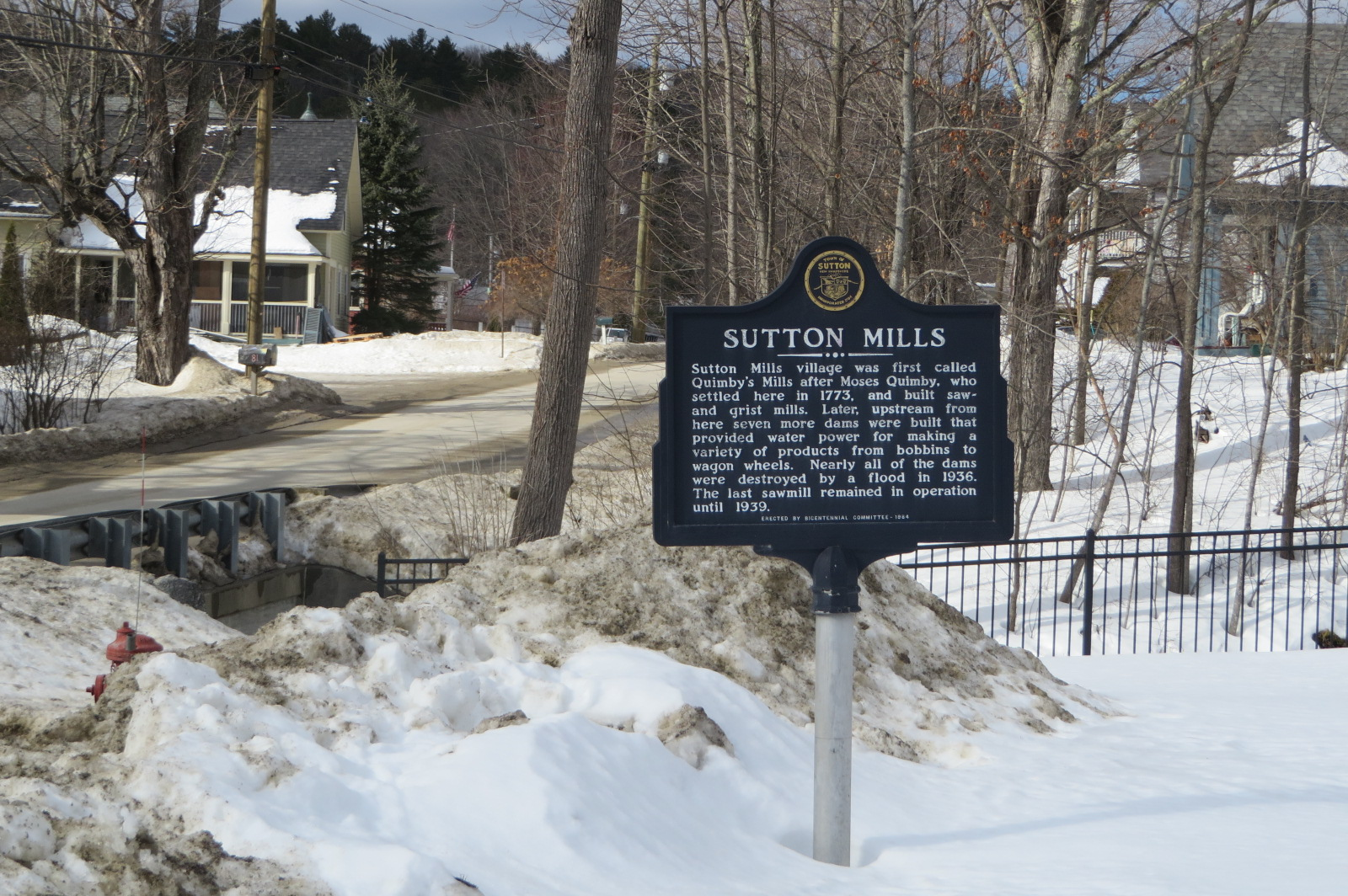
- Sutton Mills, central village in the town

- Seal

- Location in Merrimack County and the state of New Hampshire
- Coordinates: 43°20′24″N 71°55′47″W
- Country: United States
- State: New Hampshire
- County: Merrimack
- Incorporated: 1784
- Villages: Sutton (Sutton Mills); East Sutton; North Sutton; South Sutton

Area
  - Total: 43.3 sq mi (112.2 km^{2})
  - Land: 42.5 sq mi (110.2 km^{2})
  - Water: 0.77 sq mi (2.0 km^{2})
- Elevation: 1,112 ft (339 m)

Population (2020)
  - Total: 1,978
  - Density: 46/sq mi (17.9/km^{2})
- Time zone: UTC-5 (Eastern (EST))
  - Summer (DST): UTC-4 (EDT)
- ZIP Codes: 03221 (Bradford); 03260 (North Sutton); 03273 (South Sutton); 03278 (Warner)
- Area code: 603
- FIPS code: 33-75460
- GNIS feature ID: 873734
- Website: www.suttonnh.gov

Sutton is a town in Merrimack County, New Hampshire, United States. The population was 1,978 at the 2020 census. Sutton includes the villages of Sutton Mills (shown as "Sutton" on topographic maps), North Sutton, South Sutton and East Sutton. North Sutton is home to Wadleigh State Park on Kezar Lake.

== History ==
The town was granted in 1749 by the Masonian Proprietors to inhabitants of Haverhill, Newbury, and Bradford, Massachusetts, as well as Kingston, New Hampshire. It was called "Perrystown" after Obadiah Perry, one of the proprietors. But the French and Indian War delayed settlement until 1767, when David Peaslee arrived. Many proprietors forfeited their claims, even with an extension in 1773, so the town was regranted in 1784. The second group of settlers were from Sutton, Massachusetts, source of the town's current name.

In 1981, the world’s first paintball facility was opened in Sutton. The facilities were operated by Bob Gurnsey, one of the inventors of paintballing. The facility closed in 1985.

== Geography ==
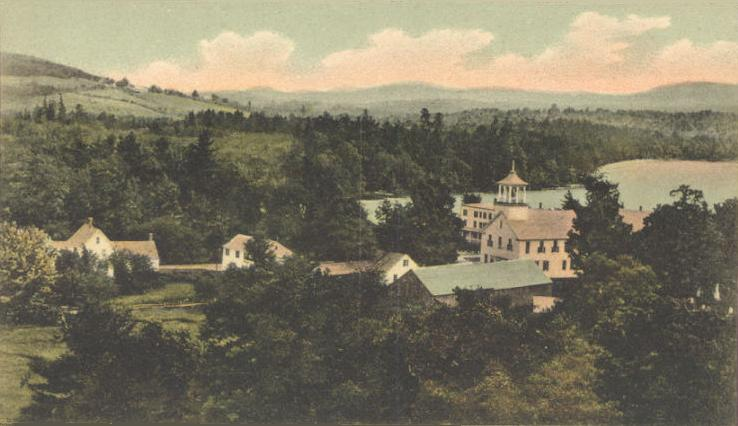
View of North Sutton c. 1905

Sutton is in central New Hampshire, in the western part of Merrimack County. According to the United States Census Bureau, the town has a total area of 43.3 square miles (112.2 km^{2}), of which 42.5 square miles (110.2 km^{2}) are land and 0.77 square miles (2.0 km^{2}) are water, comprising 1.80% of the town. The highest point in Sutton is the summit of Kings Hill, at approximately 1,930 feet (590 m) above sea level, in the northwestern corner of the town.

The town is drained primarily by tributaries of the Warner River, which flows to the Contoocook River and ultimately the Merrimack River. The Lane River, a tributary of the Warner, drains a large portion of the center of town. The northern portion of town is drained by Cascade Brook, a north-flowing tributary of the Blackwater River, itself a tributary of the Contoocook. The extreme northwestern corner of town is part of the Lake Sunapee watershed, draining via the Sugar River of western New Hampshire into the Connecticut River. Blaisdell Lake is in the southwestern part of the town.

Sutton is served by Interstate 89 and New Hampshire Route 114.

=== Adjacent municipalities ===
- New London (north)
- Wilmot (northeast)
- Warner (east)
- Bradford (south)
- Newbury (west)

== Demographics ==
Historical population
Census	Pop.	Note	%±
1790	520		—
1800	878		68.8%
1810	1,328		51.3%
1820	1,573		18.4%
1830	1,424		−9.5%
1840	1,361		−4.4%
1850	1,387		1.9%
1860	1,431		3.2%
1870	1,155		−19.3%
1880	993		−14.0%
1890	849		−14.5%
1900	776		−8.6%
1910	698		−10.1%
1920	632		−9.5%
1930	512		−19.0%
1940	675		31.8%
1950	554		−17.9%
1960	487		−12.1%
1970	642		31.8%
1980	1,091		69.9%
1990	1,457		33.5%
2000	1,544		6.0%
2010	1,837		19.0%
2020	1,978		7.7%
U.S. Decennial Census

As of the census of 2010, there were 1,837 people, 757 households, and 556 families residing in the town. The population density was 43.4 inhabitants per square mile (16.8/km^{2}). There were 985 housing units at an average density of 23.3 per square mile (9.0/km^{2}). The racial makeup of the town was 96.5% White, 0.3% Black or African American, 0.3% Native American, 0.8% Asian, 0.5% Native Hawaiian or other Pacific Islander, 0.3% some other race, and 1.4% from two or more races. Hispanic or Latino of any race were 1.1% of the population.

There were 757 households, out of which 27.2% had children under the age of 18 living with them, 63.7% were headed by married couples living together, 7.1% had a female householder with no husband present, and 26.6% were non-families. 20.1% of all households were made up of individuals, and 6.9% had someone living alone who was 65 years of age or older. The average household size was 2.43, and the average family size was 2.78.

In the town, the population was spread out, with 21.6% under the age of 18, 5.1% from 18 to 24, 21.9% from 25 to 44, 35.2% from 45 to 64, and 16.2% who were 65 years of age or older. The median age was 45.8 years. For every 100 females, there were 100.5 males. For every 100 females age 18 and over, there were 99.7 males.

At the 2000 census, the median income for a household in the town was $50,924, and the median income for a family was $56,685. Males had a median income of $34,250 versus $30,658 for females. The per capita income for the town was $24,432. About 2.8% of families and 5.0% of the population were below the poverty line, including 8.0% of those under age 18 and 4.7% of those age 65 or over.

== Education ==
There are three public schools in the town: Sutton Central School (an elementary school), Kearsarge Regional Middle School, and Kearsarge Regional High School.

== Notable people ==
- John Eaton (1829–1906), general, commissioner of education
- Albert W. Harvey (1879–1956), United States Marshal for the District of Vermont
- Jonathan Harvey (1780–1859), US congressman
- Matthew Harvey (1781–1866), U.S. congressman, 13th governor of New Hampshire
- May C. Jones (1842 – ?), 19th-century American Baptist minister
- John S. Pillsbury (1827–1901), businessman, eighth governor of Minnesota
- Lydia Fowler Wadleigh (1817–1888), educator
- Charles D. Wells, Wisconsin assemblyman
- Augusta Harvey Worthen (1823–1910), educator, author
