= New London, New Hampshire =

- Town
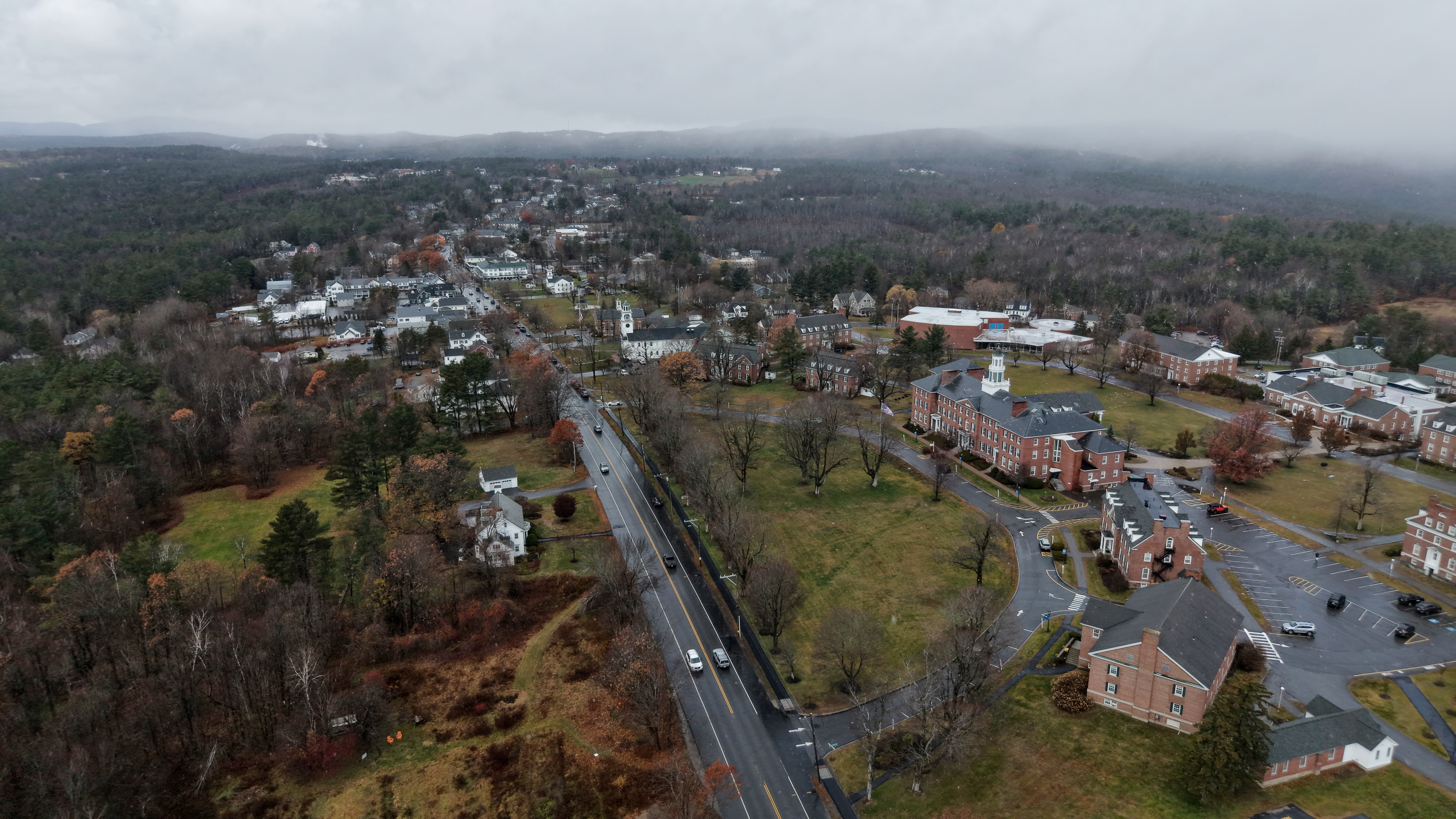
- New London from the southeast, with Colby-Sawyer College in the foreground

- Seal

- Location in Merrimack County and the state of New Hampshire
- Coordinates: 43°25′05″N 71°59′26″W
- Country: United States
- State: New Hampshire
- County: Merrimack
- Incorporated: 1779
- Villages: New London; Elkins; Otterville

Area
  - Total: 25.42 sq mi (65.84 km^{2})
  - Land: 22.34 sq mi (57.86 km^{2})
  - Water: 3.08 sq mi (7.98 km^{2}) 12.12%
- Elevation: 1,266 ft (386 m)

Population (2020)
  - Total: 4,400
  - Density: 200/sq mi (76/km^{2})
- Time zone: UTC-5 (Eastern)
  - Summer (DST): UTC-4 (Eastern)
- ZIP codes: 03257 (New London); 03233 (Elkins)
- Area code: 603
- FIPS code: 33-52100
- GNIS feature ID: 873682
- Website: newlondon.nh.gov

New London is a town in Merrimack County, New Hampshire, United States. The population was 4,400 at the 2020 census. The town is the home of Colby–Sawyer College, site of the Gordon Research Conferences since 1947.

The town center, where 1,266 people resided at the 2020 census, is defined as the New London census-designated place (CDP), and is located on a hilltop along New Hampshire Route 114 north of Route 11 and Interstate 89.

== History ==
In 1753, the Masonian Proprietors of Portsmouth, New Hampshire, granted the area now called New London as "Heidelberg". Although it appears on some New Hampshire maps, the township was never settled, and the 1753 grant lapsed into default.

In 1773, roughly the same area was awarded as the "Alexandria Addition" to a new group of speculators, who had previously been granted the adjacent township of Alexandria. These proprietors were led by Jonas Minot of Concord, Massachusetts, but the others were Scotch-Irish immigrants living in Londonderry, New Hampshire. None built dwellings in the Alexandria Addition. Instead they recruited settlers to build roads, mills, schools, and a church—all increasing the value of their land holdings. Nearly all of the original settlers came from Massachusetts, either from the Amesbury area of the north shore or from the Attleboro area in the southeast. The township proprietors soon began a long, systematic process of subdividing and selling their properties at great profit.

By 1779, there were sixteen families recorded within the bounds of the Alexandria Addition, and they petitioned the General Court to incorporate as the town of "New London"—officially named after London, England, but perhaps also an acknowledgement of the Londonderry-based proprietors. The first town meeting was held on August 3, 1779.

In 1807, the northern half of New London was annexed, merged with an area called "Kearsarge Gore", and then incorporated as the town of Wilmot, New Hampshire. In the early 19th century, there were three small additions to New London, including the village of Otterville in 1817.

=== 20th century ===
In 1947, Colby–Sawyer College became the site of the annual Gordon Research Conferences.

On April 20, 1965, John Sargent, a Korean war veteran, killed his wife and four children by shooting them. He was later charged with the murders, but was found mentally ill and committed to a psychiatric hospital. It is the worst mass shooting in New Hampshire’s history.

== Geography ==
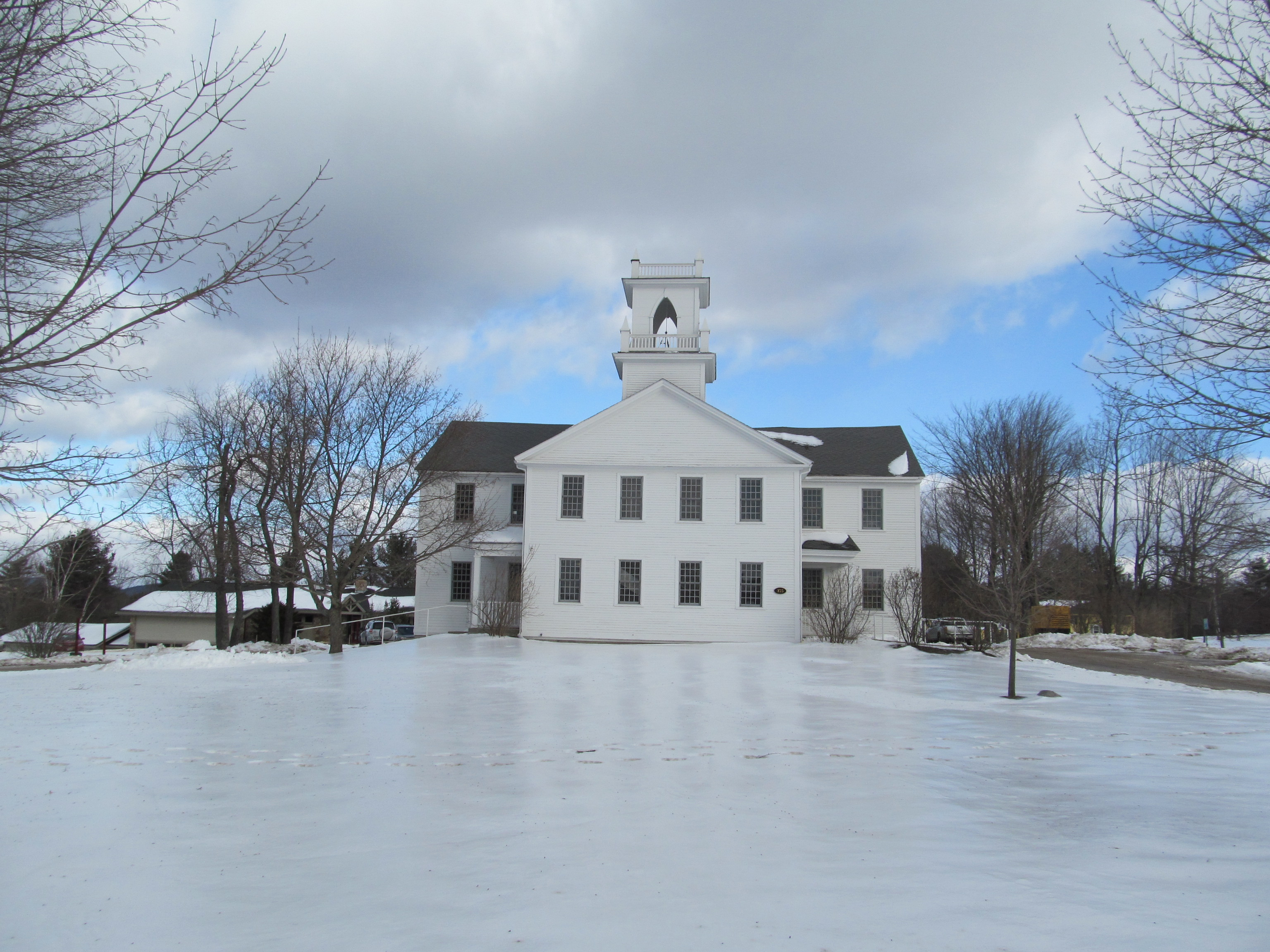
Town offices

According to the United States Census Bureau, the town has a total area of 25.4 square miles (65.8 km^{2}), of which 22.4 square miles (57.9 km^{2}) are land and 0.3 square miles (0.8 km^{2}) are water, comprising 12.12% of the town. Several large lakes are in the town, including Lake Sunapee forming the western border, Little Sunapee Lake north of the center, and Pleasant Lake in the east. The western side of town, including Lake Sunapee and Little Sunapee, is part of the Connecticut River watershed, via the Sugar River. The center and eastern side of the town are part of the Merrimack River watershed, with the center draining south to the Lane River in Sutton and from there to the Warner River, and the eastern section draining to the Blackwater River. The Warner and the Blackwater are both tributaries of the Contoocook River, which joins the Merrimack in Penacook. The highest point in town is Morgan Hill, approximately 1,770 feet (540 m) above sea level.

The town is crossed by Interstate 89, which serves New London with two exits, and by New Hampshire Routes 11, 103A, and 114.

=== Adjacent municipalities ===
- Springfield (north)
- Wilmot (east)
- Sutton (southeast)
- Newbury (south)
- Sunapee (west)

== Demographics ==
Historical population
Census	Pop.	Note	%±
1790	311		—
1800	617		98.4%
1810	692		12.2%
1820	924		33.5%
1830	913		−1.2%
1840	1,019		11.6%
1850	945		−7.3%
1860	952		0.7%
1870	959		0.7%
1880	875		−8.8%
1890	799		−8.7%
1900	768		−3.9%
1910	805		4.8%
1920	701		−12.9%
1930	812		15.8%
1940	1,039		28.0%
1950	1,484		42.8%
1960	1,738		17.1%
1970	2,236		28.7%
1980	2,935		31.3%
1990	3,180		8.3%
2000	4,116		29.4%
2010	4,397		6.8%
2020	4,400		0.1%
U.S. Decennial Census

As of the census of 2010, there were 4,397 people, 1,666 households, and 1,037 families residing in the town. There were 2,303 housing units, of which 637, or 27.7%, were vacant. 521 of the vacant units were for seasonal or recreational use. The racial makeup of the town was 96.5% white, 1.1% African American, 0.05% Native American, 1.1% Asian, 0.05% Native Hawaiian or Pacific Islander, 0.1% some other race, and 1.2% from two or more races. 1.5% of the population were Hispanic or Latino of any race.

Of the 1,666 households, 18.7% had children under the age of 18 living with them, 54.8% were headed by married couples living together, 5.8% had a female householder with no husband present, and 37.8% were non-families. 33.4% of all households were made up of individuals, and 22.2% were someone living alone who was 65 years of age or older. The average household size was 2.09, and the average family size was 2.63. 912 town residents, or 20.7% of the population, lived in group quarters rather than households.

In the town, 13.3% of the population were under the age of 18, 22.6% were from 18 to 24, 10.0% from 25 to 44, 23.2% from 45 to 64, and 30.7% were 65 years of age or older. The median age was 48.7 years. For every 100 females, there were 76.2 males. For every 100 females age 18 and over, there were 71.3 males.

For the period 2011–2015, the estimated median annual income for a household was $68,981, and the median income for a family was $98,833. Male full-time workers had a median income of $57,237 versus $55,641 for females. The per capita income for the town was $35,090. 9.9% of the population and 6.4% of families were below the poverty line. 8.7% of the population under the age of 18 and 2.0% of those 65 or older were living in poverty.

== Sites of interest ==
- Colby–Sawyer College: A small liberal arts school that includes a gym open to the public.
- Lake Sunapee: A large lake that is 4,125 acres in size and is both a cold and warm water fishery. It attracts many people in the summer, and the northeast corner of the lake is located in New London.
- Little Sunapee Lake: A clean, small lake on the west side of town with public and private beaches. Bucklin Beach, owned and operated by the town, allows parking in its lot only by town residents.
- Pleasant Lake: Located on the east side of town, the lake features public beach access from Elkins Beach. Fireworks on the Fourth of July.
- New London Barn Playhouse: A prominent summer stock small professional theatre. New Hampshire's oldest summer theatre. Each summer it produces Musicals and Dramas to sold-out crowds of residents and tourists. Listed in the New Hampshire State Register of Historic Places (NHSRHP) since 2006.
- First Baptist Church: Built in 1826 and opened in January of the following year, the church is of a classical New England design by the renowned church architect Asher Benjamin. Listed in both the National Register of Historic Places and NHSRHP since 2005.
- Mount Kearsarge: The mountain occupies the towns of Warner and Wilmot and is a prominent landform overlooking New London. The Wilmot trailhead in Winslow State Park is a 15-minute drive away, and the trip from the park to the summit is about 1 mile by the Winslow Trail. The Barlow Trail is a longer route to the summit that allows hikers to make a loop.
- Mount Sunapee Resort is about 20 minutes (12 miles (19 km) by road) south of town and provides skiing and riding in the winter. It is also a resort in the summer, featuring activities such as hiking, zip lining, rock climbing, mini and disc golf, and segway tours.
- New London Historical Society: Guided tours of its carriage and sleigh museum and its 19th-century village depicting rural New England life.
- The Ice House Museum: A collection of automobiles and Americana.
- New London Town Green: Friday nights during the summer there are free concerts here. The first weekend in August is Hospital Day, featuring a small carnival, a parade, and a triathlon to help raise money for the local hospital.

== Notable people ==
- John F. Bateman (1914–1998), American football player and coach
- Tomie dePaola (1934–2020), children's book writer and illustrator
- Minnie Mary Lee (pen name of Julia Amanda Sargent Wood; 1825–1903), writer
- Pamela Low (1928–2007), flavorist, created the flavor coating for Cap'n Crunch
