= Neobisium beroni =

Scientific classification
- Kingdom: Animalia
- Phylum: Arthropoda
- Subphylum: Chelicerata
- Class: Arachnida
- Order: Pseudoscorpiones
- Family: Neobisiidae
- Genus: Neobisium
- Species: N. beroni

Binomial name
- Neobisium beroni Beier, 1963

Species of pseudoscorpion

Neobisium beroni is a species of pseudoscorpions in the Neobisiidae family. It has only been found in Bulgaria. Its type locality is cave Svinskata peshtera, Lakatnik, Iskar Gorge, Sofia, Bulgaria.
