= Neobisium noricum =

Scientific classification
- Kingdom: Animalia
- Phylum: Arthropoda
- Subphylum: Chelicerata
- Class: Arachnida
- Order: Pseudoscorpiones
- Family: Neobisiidae
- Genus: Neobisium
- Species: N. noricum

Binomial name
- Neobisium noricum Beier, 1939

Species of pseudoscorpion

Neobisium noricum is a species of pseudoscorpions in the Neobisiidae family. It has only been found in Austria, and once in Hungary. The type locality is Hohentauern (published as Hohe Tauern) in Styria (as Steiermark), Austria.
