= Roncus hors =

Scientific classification
- Kingdom: Animalia
- Phylum: Arthropoda
- Subphylum: Chelicerata
- Class: Arachnida
- Order: Pseudoscorpiones
- Family: Neobisiidae
- Genus: Roncus
- Species: R. hors

Binomial name
- Roncus hors Curcic, Dimitrijevic & Makarov, 1997

Roncus hors is a pseudoscorpion in the family Neobisiidae found in Montenegro.

== Distribution ==
Roncus hors is endemic to Montenegro. It is known only from a cave located in the village of Gornji Morinj, near Risan, Kotor municipality.
