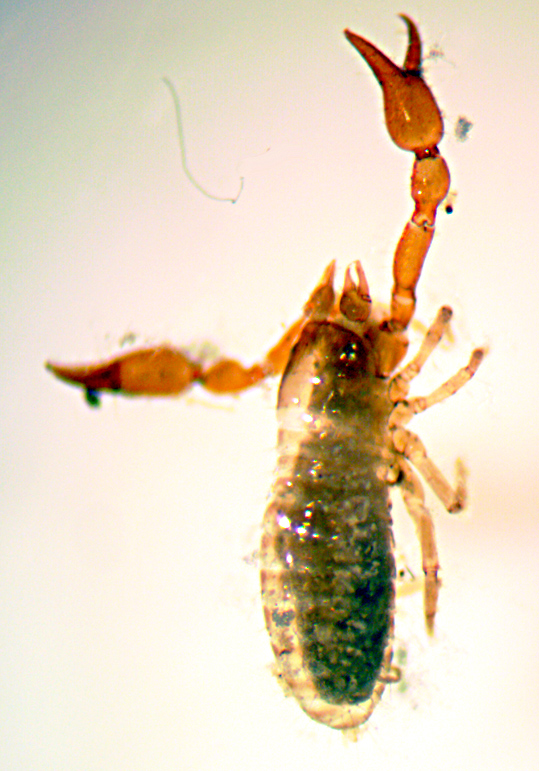

Scientific classification
- Domain: Eukaryota
- Kingdom: Animalia
- Phylum: Arthropoda
- Subphylum: Chelicerata
- Class: Arachnida
- Order: Pseudoscorpiones
- Family: Neobisiidae
- Genus: Microbisium
- Species: M. parvulum

Binomial name
- Microbisium parvulum (Banks, 1895)

= Microbisium parvulum =

Species of pseudoscorpion

Microbisium parvulum is a species of pseudoscorpion in the family Neobisiidae.
