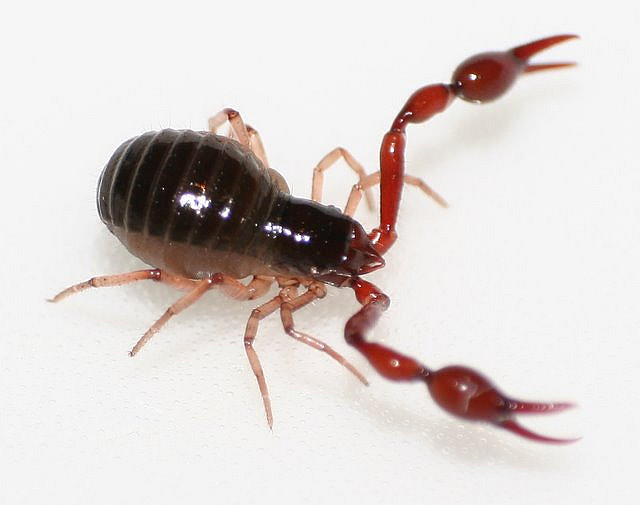

Scientific classification
- Kingdom: Animalia
- Phylum: Arthropoda
- Subphylum: Chelicerata
- Class: Arachnida
- Order: Pseudoscorpiones
- Family: Neobisiidae
- Genus: Neobisium
- Species: N. sylvaticum

Binomial name
- Neobisium sylvaticum (C. L. Koch, 1835)

= Neobisium sylvaticum =

Species of pseudoscorpion

Neobisium sylvaticum is a species of pseudoscorpions in the Neobisiidae family. It is found throughout Europe with the exception of the Benelux union, the Nordic countries, and the British Isles. The type locality is Frauenholz in Regensburg, Bavaria, Germany.

== Description ==
Specimens of this species are 5 millimetres (0.20 in) long. They are primarily black with four pairs of legs, and dark red claws.
