= Neobisium incertum =

Scientific classification
- Kingdom: Animalia
- Phylum: Arthropoda
- Subphylum: Chelicerata
- Class: Arachnida
- Order: Pseudoscorpiones
- Family: Neobisiidae
- Genus: Neobisium
- Species: N. incertum

Binomial name
- Neobisium incertum J. C. Chamberlin, 1930

Species of pseudoscorpion

Neobisium incertum is a species of pseudoscorpions in the Neobisiidae family. The type locality is Sorgono in Italy (40°02′N 9°06′E), and the species is endemic to Sardinia.
