= Microbisium brunneum =

Scientific classification
- Domain: Eukaryota
- Kingdom: Animalia
- Phylum: Arthropoda
- Subphylum: Chelicerata
- Class: Arachnida
- Order: Pseudoscorpiones
- Family: Neobisiidae
- Genus: Microbisium
- Species: M. brunneum

Binomial name
- Microbisium brunneum (Hagen, 1868)

Species of pseudoscorpion

Microbisium brunneum is a species of pseudoscorpion in the family Neobisiidae.
