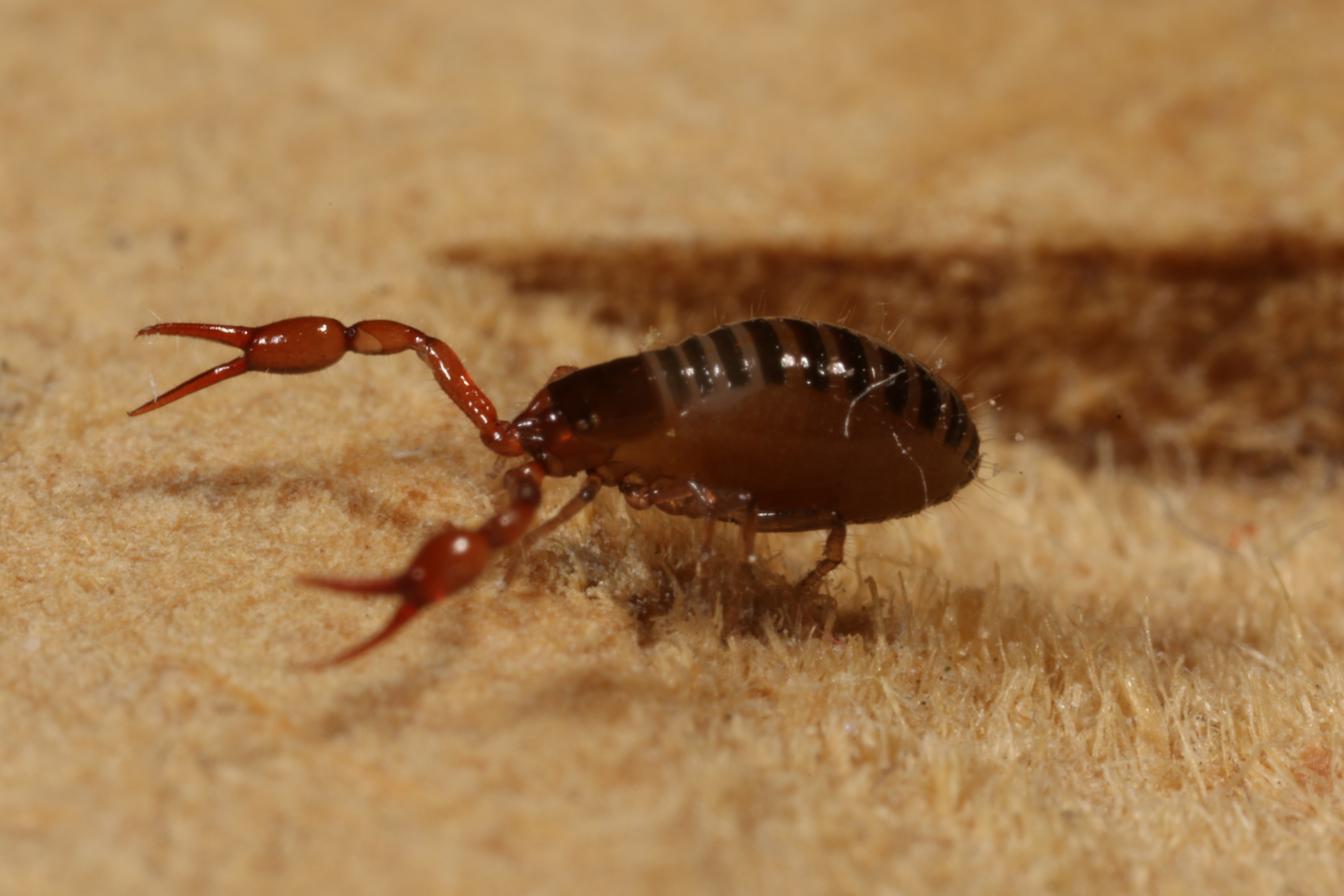

Scientific classification
- Domain: Eukaryota
- Kingdom: Animalia
- Phylum: Arthropoda
- Subphylum: Chelicerata
- Class: Arachnida
- Order: Pseudoscorpiones
- Family: Neobisiidae
- Genus: Neobisium
- Species: N. carcinoides

Binomial name
- Neobisium carcinoides (Hermann, 1804)

= Neobisium carcinoides =

Species of pseudoscorpion

Neobisium carcinoides is a species of pseudoscorpions in the Neobisiidae family. It is found throughout Europe with the exception of Greece, Belarus, and Russia. The type locality is 7 km south of Strasbourg, in the Bas-Rhin department, Alsace, France.

== Description ==
Specimens of this species are about 5 millimetres (0.20 in) long. They are primarily dark brown with four pairs of legs, and dark red claws.
