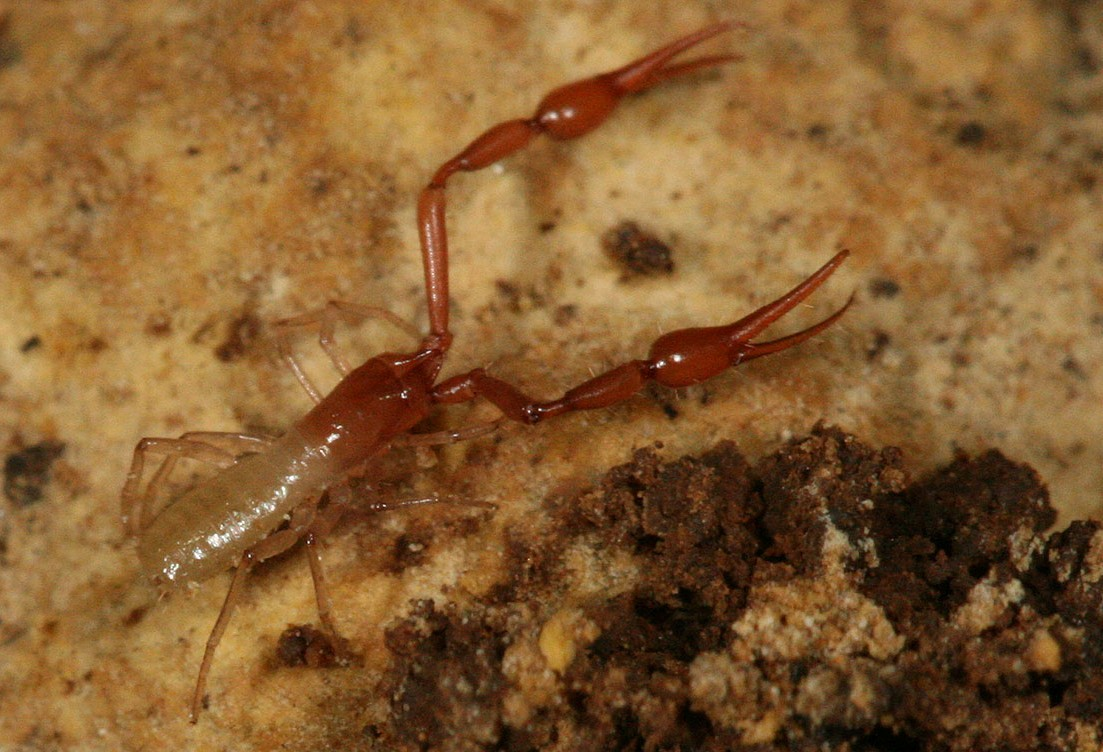

Conservation status
- Data Deficient (IUCN 2.3)

- Endangered (ESA)

Scientific classification
- Kingdom: Animalia
- Phylum: Arthropoda
- Subphylum: Chelicerata
- Class: Arachnida
- Order: Pseudoscorpiones
- Family: Neobisiidae
- Genus: Tartarocreagris
- Species: T. texana

Binomial name
- Tartarocreagris texana Muchmore, 1969

Synonyms
- Microcreagris texana; Australinocreagis texana

= Tooth Cave pseudoscorpion =

Species of pseudoscorpion

The Tooth Cave pseudoscorpion (Tartarocreagris texana) is a small cave-dwelling arachnid of the family Neobisiidae. The species was originally assigned to the genus Microcreagris, and then reassigned to Austalillocregris before arriving at its current genus, Tartarocreagris. The Tooth Cave pseudoscorpion has a small geographic distribution, known to occur in only two caves in Travis County, Texas. Additionally, it is tentatively identified in two nearby caves in Texas, but more research is necessary to accurately define the range where the species lives. There is little known about the biology, life cycle, and life history of the Tooth Cave pseudoscorpion due to a lack of research and study. Because of this, the Tooth Cave pseudoscorpion is listed on the IUCN Red List as data deficient. Under the Endangered Species Act, the Tooth Cave pseudoscorpion is listed as endangered. Recovery plans for the species focus mostly on preserving the karst ecosystem that the pseudoscorpions live in, especially including lessening human impacts on the environment.

== Description ==
Little information exists describing what Tooth Cave pseudoscorpions look like since they live in a few dark caves in Texas and are difficult to find. Some inferences are made about the Tooth Cave pseudoscorpions, however, through the commonalities of the Neobisiidae family and other cave-adapted species. Tooth Cave pseudoscorpions fall under the category of troglobites, which are species that spend their entire lives in caves. Some distinct features of troglobites include attenuated palps and long, slender appendages. Tooth Cave pseudoscorpions are large for cave-dwelling species in this area, measuring about 4 mm (0.15 in) in length. The species has no tail and no stinger, but has tiny pincers which it uses to capture small arthropods. The Tooth Cave pseudoscorpion also has a set of small teeth on these tiny pincers that help in latching onto its prey.

Pseudoscorpions, like arthropods, have a protein called sclerotin on their outer layer. This protein gives the specimen a hard exoskeleton, as well as a reddish color. Surface-adapted pseudoscorpions have more sclerotin than cave-adapted pseudoscorpions. Cave-adapted pseudoscorpions have reduced pigmentation and therefore less of a reddish color due to a lack of exposure to sunlight. Because Tooth Cave pseudoscorpions are cave-adapted, they have less rigid exoskeletons than surface-adapted pseudoscorpions. Tooth Cave pseudoscorpion palps are golden brown, and their body and legs are light tan. Additionally, troglobites have severe vision reduction. Tooth Cave pseudoscorpions show this characteristic through their lack of eyes. Since this species doesn't rely on eyesight, they must rely on other senses, such as sensory hairs to catch prey and navigate in the complete darkness of the caves.

== Life history ==
There is limited information about the life history of the Tooth Cave pseudoscorpion. But, there is more information on development, reproduction, and dispersal available about the order pseudoscorpion.

=== Tooth Cave pseudoscorpion ===
The Tooth Cave pseudoscorpion lives in an environment below ground, called a subterranean environment. This species has a lifespan of more than one year, based on what scientists have seen in captivity. This type of environment does not expose Tooth Cave pseudoscorpions to the different seasons. Thus, the Tooth Cave pseudoscorpions do not have a seasonal reproduction cycle. It instead reproduces year-round. Individuals, once born, grow and develop until sexual maturity is reached. Sexual maturity is often a body length of 4.1 mm (0.161 in) for females and 3.96 mm (0.156 in) for males. The individual body parts have specific proportions once individuals reach adulthood. The top section of the exoskeleton (carapace) is three times as thick as long; the femur is 1.5 times as long as the carapace; the pincer (chela) is 2.55 times as long as the carapace; the mouth (chelicerae) is two-thirds as long as the carapace. Further inspection of the female genitalia (spermatheca) where the species intakes male sperm can distinguish Tooth Cave pseudoscorpions from other closely related species.

=== Pseudoscorpions in general ===
The information below is about the pseudoscorpion order as a whole, not just Tooth Cave pseudoscorpions, because there is no information available for the specific species. The information about the pseudoscorpion order is likely similar to what the information would be for the Tooth Cave pseudoscorpion.

Pseudoscorpions do not take part in courtship practices or compete to find mates. To reproduce, males leave their sperm in sacs (spermatophores) in areas frequently visited by females. When a female sees a sperm sac, she intakes the sac into her gonopore. Offspring grow inside the mother until she gives birth.. The first stage after birth is called the protonymph stage, in which the offspring typically stays close to the mother. Most pseudoscorpion species are mobile during this stage, but some are immobile and completely reliant on their mother for nutrients. The next two stages, deutonymph and tritonymph, occur as the pseudoscorpion develops and increases in body size. It sheds the exoskeleton to make room for the increasing size. Once they reach individual maximum body size and sexual maturity, pseudoscorpions reach what scientists term adulthood. Pseudoscorpions do not molt after reaching this stage and permanently leave mothers to live alone.

Pseudoscorpions build silk chambers from galea, a type of tube extending from the body. These silk chambers are where pseudoscorpions molt during their various life stages (protonymph, deutonymph, and tritonymph stages). The pseudoscorpion order also uses these silk chambers to take shelter and make brood sacs for immobile young.

== Ecology ==
=== Diet ===
Tooth Cave pseudoscorpions are food generalists and eat plants or other small animals available to them. The main diet of the Tooth Cave pseudoscorpion consists of invertivores, which are small insects, and other similar-sized arthropods, such as mites. Like other cave-dwelling species, they also rely on surface plants for nutrients. Surface plants in caves mostly consist of leaf mulch, plant roots, and organic debris. Tooth Cave pseudoscorpions also find nutrients in deposited organic matter, especially from bats and cave crickets. The cave cricket deposits feces and eggs in areas accessible to Tooth Cave pseudoscorpions. Tooth Cave pseudoscorpions also have been known to eat decaying bodies of cave crickets.

=== Behavior ===
There is currently no information on the mating behavior of Tooth Cave pseudoscorpions. However, for pseudoscorpions in general, there are no courtship behaviors associated with reproduction. Because the male leaves sperm in sacs that a female later picks up with specialized organs, the two individuals do not meet each other, but produce offspring together. Tooth Cave pseudoscorpions are also known to forage for food at night, briefly leaving the cave to find nutrition in the surrounding plant and cricket populations near the cave.

=== Habitat ===
Tooth Cave pseudoscorpions need to live in small, dark caves that have acidic groundwater that dissolve calcium carbonate. The acidic groundwater is crucial for the survival of the Tooth Cave pseudoscorpions because it creates various types of geographical features, like caves, sinkholes, fractures, and interconnections with other caves. These features act as a natural barrier to the outside world. This barrier ensures that the humidity levels remain relatively high and the temperature remains fairly stable. This is an important factor for the temperature-sensitive Tooth Cave pseudoscorpion. Karst environments also ensure that there is proper drainage of water from the cave to further maintain the prime humidity level.

Each type of cave that the Tooth Cave pseudoscorpion lives in is unique. Thus, individual populations have adaptations to their specific environment. However, the Tooth Cave pseudoscorpion cannot adapt to climate change as fast as it is increasing temperatures.

=== Range ===
The Tooth Cave pseudoscorpion is only confirmed in two caves: Tooth Cave and Amber Cave, in Travis County, Texas. The caves span the Balcones Canyonlands, ranging from eastern to southeastern Edwards Plateau. Generally keeping to the caves, the Tooth Cave pseudoscorpions have a range of approximately 1 km from the caves before the environment becomes unsuitable for them to live. The caves are currently in peril of falling in due to the urbanization of the local communities, so the populations may shrink in the near future.

== Conservation ==
=== Population size ===
The Tooth Cave pseudoscorpion population size is currently ranked as "H," or "historical data." The current information about population sizes and distribution is lacking, with too little research to classify the population in a different way. This could be due to many factors such as imprecise locations, disturbances to the population, and unstable habitats. There is also a lack of researchers currently studying the species.

=== Past and current geographical distribution ===
There is little to no data on the past and current distribution of the Tooth Cave pseudoscorpion. Due to a lack of research and study of the species, there is also little known about where they live. All that is confirmed is that they live in Travis County, Texas, in 2 caves, including Tooth Cave and Amber Cave, and are suspected to live in other nearby caves. However, the extent of their range is unknown.

=== Major threats ===
The threats to the Tooth Cave pseudoscorpion are mostly indirect. The largest and most imminent threat is human activity that destroys their habitat and food sources. The species was first listed as endangered on September 16, 1988, due to restricted distribution and threats from urban development. This development caused stressors to their habitat, including destruction, degradation, and fragmentation.

Travis County, Texas experienced an increase in human population between 1980 and 2017, rising from 419,573 to 1,226,698. In addition, single and multi-family housing units increased by 394% over the 46-year period between 1970 and 2016. With these population increases, came significant urban development. The karst cave environments where Tooth Cave pseudoscorpions live are next to residential neighborhoods. This puts them at an increased risk for habitat degradation and pollution. Karst habitats are specifically threatened by urbanization due to the dangers of cave infilling, drainage pattern changes, chemical contamination, and disruption of surface plant and animal distribution. Cave habitats are also threatened by mining and quarrying practices that decrease karst environments.

The Tooth Cave pseudoscorpion is also threatened by invasive predators and competitors, especially the red imported fire ant. This ant species arrived in Travis County in the 1970s, and has been recorded in over 140 caves. The ants prey upon the Tooth Cave pseudoscorpion, but they also compete for the same food sources, especially cave crickets. Declines in cave cricket populations are also linked to declines in similar karst invertebrates to the Tooth Cave pseudoscorpion. However, direct correlations between the cave cricket and the Tooth Cave pseudoscorpion have not been studied. The tawny crazy ant species was first documented in Travis County in 2002, and is potentially a threat to the Tooth Cave pseudoscorpion. This invasive species has the potential to disrupt native ecosystems in a similar way as the red imported fire ant.

The Tooth Cave pseudoscorpion is also threatened by natural factors. Its limited distribution and reliance on a specific ecosystem make it vulnerable to population declines and decrease the likelihood of establishing new colonies. They are also extremely small and have little to no ability to move large distances on the surface. The fragility of cave ecosystems also affects their ability to thrive. Additionally, there is little to no regulation in Texas that protects the species. The Texas Commission on Environment Quality (TCEQ) does not include protection for karst habitats and the City of Austin's Environmental Criteria Manual is not sufficient to protect cave cricket foraging areas. It also does not apply to all karst invertebrates.

=== Listing under the ESA ===
The Tooth Cave pseudoscorpion was listed under the ESA as endangered on September 16, 1988, with a recovery plan formed in 1994. The listing cited human urbanization as a leading cause of the endangerment of the Tooth Cave pseudoscorpion. It is not currently listed on the IUCN Red List, as there is not sufficient data for the IUCN to categorize it.

=== Five-year review ===
A five-year review initiated in 2009 classified the recovery priority for the species as 2C. A recovery priority number of 2C means there is a high degree of threat and a high recovery potential. The C indicates that the species' recovery conflicts with economic activity such as water demands and development projects. The next review in 2018 determined that while there was a recovery plan in place with the goal of down-listing the species, there were no delisting criteria identified. The review suggested that research on similar karst invertebrates could be applied to the Tooth Cave pseudoscorpion to develop delisting criteria. Furthermore, the five-year review found that no down-listing criteria have been met since 2009. The review identified two potential cave sites that could begin to meet delisting criteria, but there was insufficient information to determine whether the sites qualified.

=== Species status assessment ===
Due to a lack of research and study of the Tooth Cave pseudoscorpion, there were no updates to the biology and habitat, abundance, population trends, demographic features, demographic trends, genetics, variation, taxonomic classification, or changes in nomenclature in the most recent species status assessment. The 2018 five-year review agrees with the 2009 review on the distribution of the species: five caves with records of the species from four karst fauna regions in Travis County, Texas. There is no data specific to the Tooth Cave pseudoscorpion, although research on troglodytic arachnids suggests that they may travel through a network of underground voids. A study documents similarities between Tooth Cave spider populations in caves in Travis County and the caves the Tooth Cave pseudoscorpion is known to inhabit. This study implies that the spiders move between caves over time through underground openings. The species status assessment assumes that if the Tooth Cave pseudoscorpion also lives in connected caves, its population may be capable of traveling.

There is not enough information to estimate population sizes or sustainable reproductive rates of the Tooth Cave pseudoscorpion. The assessment used measurements of surface habitats to estimate Tooth Cave pseudoscorpion population information. Using this data, it was suggested that agriculture within 50 meters of an inhabited cave significantly reduced the species richness of cave organisms. This is due to chemical contamination, the loss of surrounding native vegetation, and urbanization. Development projects were also suggested to be more harmful to cave ecosystems than agricultural projects. The 2018 review also used 2016 aerial photographs of surrounding caves to assess habitat elements. It found that there were only two caves with high to moderate resiliency that the species is known to live in.

=== Recovery plan ===
The recovery plan for the Tooth Cave pseudoscorpion aims to down-list the species from endangered to threatened. The plan hopes to succeed through further research, protecting and managing habitats, creating educational programs, and monitoring all active programs. It was originally approved on August 25, 1994, and developed by Lisa O'Donnell, Ruth Stanford, and William Elliot of the Austin Texas US Fish and Wildlife Service. An amendment to the recovery plan was approved on August 28, 2019.

The plan lists the following criteria to down-list the Tooth Cave pseudoscorpion from endangered to threatened:

1. At least one high-quality protected karst fauna area per karst fauna region
2. At least three total medium- or high-quality protected karst fauna areas per karst fauna region
3. A minimum of six protected karst fauna areas range-wide
4. A minimum of three high-quality karst fauna areas range-wide
5. All karst fauna areas are medium or high quality

In the fall of 1988, governmental agency representatives in Austin, Texas made the Balcones Canyonlands Conservation Plan (BCCP). This plan allowed taking endangered species outside preservation areas. The Tooth Cave pseudoscorpion, among six other endangered cave species from Travis County, was included in this plan. It requires all refugia to include land large enough that populations of each species are protected. It also accommodates industrial and utility development in the area while preserving habitats. Two types of corridors were created to contain large parts of the inhabited land, but also to be used for other purposes. Primary corridors are existing corridors that would receive the majority of new development. Secondary corridors are existing corridors that would not need development. Planned corridors are unconstructed corridors that would be created if a habitat became endangered.

The Endangered and Threatened Animals of Texas publication in 2003 lists many preservation actions for karst invertebrates that apply to the Tooth Cave pseudoscorpion. It suggests that recovery efforts focus on researching the diversity of animals and plants in cave habitats. This would also help to control the red imported fire ant population that threatens the Tooth Cave pseudoscorpion. In December 2002, the Williamson County Karst Foundation created a long-term method to conserve the three endangered invertebrates in its county, including any possible populations of the Tooth Cave pseudoscorpion. Other private landowners and governmental agencies were included in this plan to help with conservation efforts. The publication also provides management guidelines for karst invertebrates. These include preserving the known cave sites, avoiding altering surface drainage patterns, preserving native vegetation, preventing groundwater contamination, restricting human visitation, and controlling exotic species (especially fire ants).
