= Fissilicreagris imperialis =

Conservation status
- Vulnerable (IUCN 2.3)

- Critically Imperiled (NatureServe)

Scientific classification
- Kingdom: Animalia
- Phylum: Arthropoda
- Subphylum: Chelicerata
- Class: Arachnida
- Order: Pseudoscorpiones
- Family: Neobisiidae
- Genus: Fissilicreagris
- Species: F. imperialis

Binomial name
- Fissilicreagris imperialis (Muchmore, 1969)

Species of pseudoscorpion

Fissilicreagris imperialis, the Empire Cave pseudoscorpion, is a species of pseudoscorpion in family Neobisiidae. Fissilicreagris imperialis is endemic to Empire, Dolloff, and IXL caves in Cave Gulch, Santa Cruz County, California. It may occur in one or more of the other caves in Cave Gulch, but it is certainly restricted to this small, isolated karst area. Its habitat is threatened by groups of students who come to the cave to drink and party, and possibly by the clean-up efforts that follow.
