= Neobisium maritimum =

Scientific classification
- Kingdom: Animalia
- Phylum: Arthropoda
- Subphylum: Chelicerata
- Class: Arachnida
- Order: Pseudoscorpiones
- Family: Neobisiidae
- Genus: Neobisium
- Species: N. maritimum

Binomial name
- Neobisium maritimum (Leach, 1817)

Species of pseudoscorpion

Neobisium maritimum is a species of pseudoscorpion in the Neobisiidae family.

== Description ==
The species are 3.2 millimetres (0.13 in) long. It has two pairs of eyes that are positioned at the front of the cephalothorax. The colour of it is black, with orange-red claws.

== Distribution ==
It is found in Maritime Western Europe.

== Habitat ==
It can be found in rock crevices, and under stones.
