= Neobisium aueri =

Scientific classification
- Kingdom: Animalia
- Phylum: Arthropoda
- Subphylum: Chelicerata
- Class: Arachnida
- Order: Pseudoscorpiones
- Family: Neobisiidae
- Genus: Neobisium
- Subgenus: Blothrus
- Species: N. aueri

Binomial name
- Neobisium aueri Beier, 1962

Species of arachnid

Neobisium aueri is a species of cave-dwelling pseudoscorpion in the family Neobisiidae endemic to the Austrian Alps. It is found only in caves in the Totes Gebirge and the Warscheneck in central Austria.

Neobisium aueri was scientifically described in 1962 by Austrian zoologist Max Beier of the Natural History Museum, Vienna, in a paper published in Die Höhle: Zeitschrift für Karst- und Höhlenkunde (lit. "The Cave: Journal for Karst- and Cave-Science"). Beier reported that two cave explorers, Alfred Auer and Karl Gaisberger had discovered a highly specialized species of pseudoscorpion belonging to the genus Neobisium, subgenus Blothrus. According to Auer, they found the creature under a rock over 400 metres from the entrance of the cave. They also found discarded exuviae under the rock. Auer suspected that white springtails found nearby made up part of the pseudoscorpion's diet. The cave itself was located over 1500 m above sea level, in Almberg-Eis-und-Tropfstein-Höhle (lit. 'Almberg Ice and Stalactite Cave') on Totes Gebirge near Grundslee, Styria. The holotype specimen, kept at the NHM Vienna, is female. Auer also collected a second specimen of unidentified sex from the cave, designated by Beier as a paratype specimen.
