= Parobisium yosemite =

Scientific classification
- Kingdom: Animalia
- Phylum: Arthropoda
- Subphylum: Chelicerata
- Class: Arachnida
- Order: Pseudoscorpiones
- Family: Neobisiidae
- Genus: Parobisium
- Species: P. yosemite

Binomial name
- Parobisium yosemite Cokendolpher & Krejca, 2010

Species of pseudoscorpion

Parobisium yosemite, or the Yosemite cave pseudoscorpion, is a species of pseudoscorpion in the family Neobisiidae. A troglobite, the pseudoscorpion inhabits talus caves, formed by voids between boulders, in Yosemite National Park.

== Distribution ==
The species is endemic to granite talus caves in Yosemite National Park in California, United States. The type specimens were found in two caves less than 0.5 kilometres (0.31 mi) within a single scree. As the talus caves it inhabits are likely only a few hundred years old, it is thought that the pseudoscorpions migrate between different talus slopes and caves.

== Description ==
Like other troglofauna, P. yosemite is blind with absent posterior eyes and a lack of a tapetum lucidum, and displays unusual pigmentation. The pseudoscorpion is potentially the first North American troglobite documented in a talus cave.

== Ecology ==
P. yosemite has been observed preying on Sinella springtails. It may also potentially prey on other invertebrates in its cave environment, including mites, spiders, beetles and ants.

== Etymology ==
The species' namesake is Yosemite National Park.
