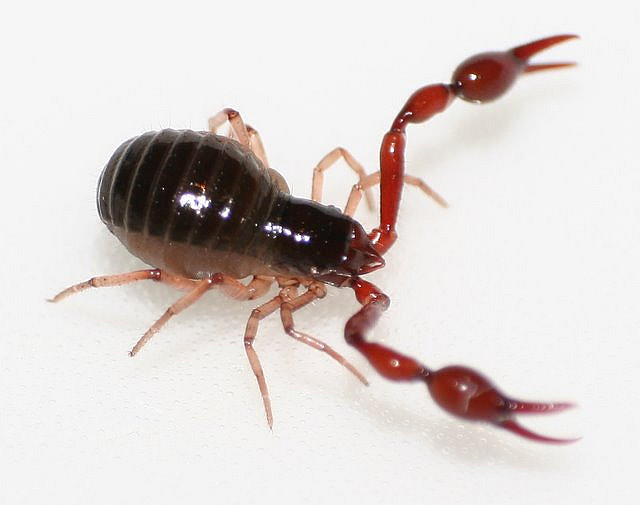
- Neobisium sylvaticum

Scientific classification
- Kingdom: Animalia
- Phylum: Arthropoda
- Subphylum: Chelicerata
- Class: Arachnida
- Order: Pseudoscorpiones
- Family: Neobisiidae
- Genus: Neobisium; J. C. Chamberlin, 1930

Synonyms
- Obisium Illiger, 1798

= Neobisium =

Neobisium Temporal range: Palaeogene–present

Genus of pseudoscorpions

Neobisium is a genus of pseudoscorpions in the family Neobisiidae.

== Species ==
Genus Nemaspela consists of at least 286 species grouped into 6 subgenera:

=== subgenus Blothrus ===
Neobisium abeillei (E. Simon, 1872)

Neobisium absoloni Beier, 1938

Neobisium alae Ćurčić, Dimitrijević, S.B. Ćurčić & Mitić, 2004

Neobisium albanicum (G. Müller, 1931)

Neobisium anaisae Ćurčić & Lemaire, 2009

Neobisium auberti Leclerc, 1982

Neobisium aueri Beier, 1962

Neobisium babusnicae Curcic, 1980

Neobisium bolivari (Nonidez, 1917)

Neobisium boneti Beier, 1931

Neobisium bozidarcurcici Dimitrijević, 2009

Neobisium breuili (Bolivar, 1924)

Neobisium brevipes (J. Frivaldsky, 1865)

Neobisium caecum Beier, 1939

Neobisium carnae Beier, 1938

Neobisium casalei Gardini, 1985

Neobisium cervelloi Mahnert, 1977

Neobisium closanicum Dumitresco & Orghidan, 1970

Neobisium coiffaiti Heurtault, 1986

Neobisium creticum (Beier, 1931)

Neobisium crucis Ćurčić, Rađa, Dimitrijević, S.B. Ćurčić, N.B. Ćurčić & Ilić, 2013

Neobisium curcici Dimitrijević & Rađa, 2016

Neobisium dalmatinum Beier, 1938

Neobisium davidbengurioni Ćurčić & Dimitrijević, 2004

Neobisium deschmanni (G. Joseph, 1882)

Neobisium dinaricum Hadži, 1933

Neobisium georgecastriotae Ćurčić, Dimitrijević, Rađa, Dudić, Šimić & Vujčić-Karlo, 2006

Neobisium goldameirae Ćurčić & Dimitrijević, 2004

Neobisium golemanskyi Curcic & Dimitrijevic, 2001

Neobisium hadzii Beier, 1938

Neobisium heros Beier, 1938

Neobisium hiberum Beier, 1931

Neobisium hypochthon Beier, 1938

Neobisium imbecillum Beier, 1938

Neobisium infernum Beier, 1938

Neobisium insulare Beier, 1938

Neobisium jeanneli (Ellingsen, 1912)

Neobisium karamani (Hadži, 1929)

Neobisium korabense Curcic, 1982

Neobisium kwartirnikovi Mahnert, 1972

Neobisium latellai Gardini, 2018

Neobisium leruthi Beier, 1939

Neobisium lethaeum Beier, 1938

Neobisium longidigitatum (Ellingsen, 1908)

Neobisium maderi Beier, 1938

Neobisium maksimtodorovici Curcic, Dimitrijevic & Mihajlova, 2002

Neobisium marcchagalli Ćurčić & S.B. Ćurčić, 2004

Neobisium maxbeieri Dumitresco & Orghidan, 1972

Neobisium minutum (Tömösváry, 1882)

Neobisium mirkaci Ćurčić & Radja, 2010

Neobisium monasterii Mahnert, 1977

Neobisium montdori Ćurčić, Makarov, Radja, S.B. Ćurčić, N.B. Ćurčić & Pecelj, 2010

Neobisium mosorense Ćurčić, Makarov, Radja, S.B. Ćurčić, N.B. Ćurčić & Pecelj, 2010

Neobisium navaricum (Nonidez, 1925)

Neobisium ninae Ćurčić, Dimitrijević & Tomić, 2008

Neobisium nonidezi (Bolivar, 1924)

Neobisium occultum Beier, 1938

Neobisium odysseum (Beier, 1929)

Neobisium ohridanum Hadži, 1940

Neobisium peruni Curcic, 1988

Neobisium peyerimhoffi Heurtault, 1990

Neobisium phineum Beier, 1938

Neobisium pluzinensis Ćurčić, Rađa, Dimitrijević, S.B. Ćurčić, N.B. Ćurčić & Ilić, 2013

Neobisium primitivum Beier, 1931

Neobisium princeps Curcic, 1974

Neobisium pusillum Beier, 1939

Neobisium radjai Dimitrijević & Rađa, 2017

Neobisium reimoseri (Beier, 1929)

Neobisium remyi Beier, 1939

Neobisium robustum (Nonidez, 1925)

Neobisium slovacum Gulička, 1977

Neobisium spelaeum (Schiödte, 1847)

Neobisium stankovici Curcic, 1972

Neobisium stitkovense Curcic & Dimitrijevic, 2004

Neobisium stygium Beier, 1931

Neobisium svetovidi Curcic, 1988

Neobisium svilajae Dimitrijević & Rađa, 2009

Neobisium tantaleum Beier, 1938

Neobisium temniskovae Curcic, 2002

Neobisium tenebrarum Beier, 1938

Neobisium tenuipalpe (Nonidez, 1925)

Neobisium torrei (E. Simon, 1881)

Neobisium tuzetae Vachon, 1947

Neobisium umbratile Beier, 1938

Neobisium vachoni Beier, 1939

Neobisium valsuanii Gardini, 2018

Neobisium vasconicum (Nonidez, 1925)

Neobisium velebiticum Beier, 1938

Neobisium vjetrenicae Hadži, 1932

Neobisium vladimirpantici Ćurčić, 2004

=== subgenus Heoblothrus ===
Neobisium beroni Beier, 1963

Neobisium bulgaricum (Redikorzev, 1928)

=== subgenus Neobisium ===
A specimen of Nebosium under a scanning electron microscope (70x magnification)

Neobisium actuarium Curcic, 1984

Neobisium adjaricum Kolesnikov, Christophoryová, Przhiboro & Turbanov, 2022

Neobisium aelleni Vachon, 1976

Neobisium apuanicum Callaini, 1981

Neobisium artaxerxesi Nassirkhani, Snegovaya & Chumachenko, 2018

Neobisium babinzub Ćurčić, Dimitrijević, Tomić & Mitic, 2007

Neobisium balazuci Heurtault, 1969

Neobisium beieri Verner, 1958

Neobisium bernardi Vachon, 1937

Neobisium biharicum Beier, 1939

Neobisium blothroides (Tömösváry, 1882)

Neobisium borense Ćurčić & Dimitrijević, 2011

Neobisium bosnicum Beier, 1939

Neobisium boui Heurtault, 1969

Neobisium brevidigitatum (Beier, 1928)

Neobisium bucegicum Beier, 1964

Neobisium caporiaccoi Heurtault-Rossi, 1966

Neobisium carcinoides (Hermann, 1804)

Neobisium carinthiacum Beier, 1939

Neobisium carpaticum Beier, 1935

Neobisium carpenteri (Kew, 1910)

Neobisium carsicum Hadži, 1933

Neobisium catherineae Nassirkhani, Zaragoza, Snegovaya & Chumachenko, 2020

Neobisium cavernarum (L. Koch, 1873)

Neobisium cephalonicum (Daday, 1888)

Neobisium chironomum (L. Koch, 1873)

Neobisium corcyraeum (Beier, 1928)

Neobisium corsicum Gardini, 2023

Neobisium courtiali Gardini, 2024

Neobisium crassifemoratum (Beier, 1928)

Neobisium cristatum Beier, 1959

Neobisium delphinaticum Beier, 1954

Neobisium deltshevi Ćurčić, Dimitrijević & N.B. Ćurčić, 2010

Neobisium distinctum (Beier, 1928)

Neobisium doderoi (E. Simon, 1896)

Neobisium dolicodactylum (Canestrini, 1874)

Neobisium dolomiticum Beier, 1952

Neobisium dumitrescoae Heurtault, 1990

Neobisium elegans Beier, 1939

Neobisium erythrodactylum (L. Koch, 1873)

Neobisium fiscelli Callaini, 1983

Neobisium fuscimanum (C.L. Koch, 1843)

Neobisium galeatum Beier, 1953

Neobisium gentile Beier, 1939

Neobisium gineti Vachon, 1966

Neobisium gracilipalpe Beier, 1939

Neobisium granulosum Beier, 1963

Neobisium hellenum (E. Simon, 1885)

Neobisium helveticum Heurtault, 1971

Neobisium hermanni Beier, 1938

Neobisium hispanicum Zaragoza & Hernández-Corral, 2018

Neobisium improcerum Curcic, 1984

Neobisium inaequale Chamberlin, 1930

Neobisium incertum J.C. Chamberlin, 1930

Neobisium intermedium Mahnert, 1974

Neobisium ischyrum (Navás, 1918)

Neobisium juberthiei Heurtault, 1986

Neobisium jugorum (L. Koch, 1873)

Neobisium kamenskyi Nassirkhani, Zaragoza, Snegovaya & Chumachenko, 2020

Neobisium kovalevskayae Nassirkhani, Snegovaya & Chumachenko, 2019

Neobisium latens Curcic, 1984

Neobisium leolatellai Gardini, 2023

Neobisium macrodactylum (Daday, 1888)

Neobisium magrinii Gardini, 2023

Neobisium mahnerti Heurtault, 1980

Neobisium maritimum (Leach, 1817)

Neobisium maroccanum (Beier, 1930)

Neobisium martae (Menozzi, 1920)

Neobisium maxvachoni Heurtault, 1990

Neobisium mendelssohni Ćurčić & N.B. Ćurčić, 2004

Neobisium minimum (Beier, 1928)

Neobisium montisageli Ćurčić, Lemaire, S.B. Ćurčić, Dimitrijević, Milinčić & Pecelj, 2010

Neobisium moreoticum Beier, 1931

Neobisium nemorense Callaini, 1991

Neobisium nivale (Beier, 1929)

Neobisium noricum Beier, 1939

Neobisium oculatum Ćurčić & Rađa, 2012

Neobisium onnisi Gardini, 2024

Neobisium osellai Callaini, 1983

Neobisium pacei Callaini, 1991

Neobisium parasimile Heurtault, 1986

Neobisium pauperculum Beier, 1959

Neobisium peloponnesiacum (Beier, 1928)

Neobisium perunoides Ćurčić, Dimitrijević & Rađa, 2006

Neobisium petruzzielloi Gardini, 2023

Neobisium phitosi Mahnert, 1973

Neobisium polonicum Rafalski, 1936

Neobisium praecipuum (E. Simon, 1879)

Neobisium pyrenaicum Heurtault, 1980

Neobisium reductum Mahnert, 1977

Neobisium reitteri (Beier, 1928)

Neobisium ressli Beier, 1965

Neobisium rhodium Beier, 1962

Neobisium ruffoi Beier, 1958

Neobisium schenkeli (Strand, 1932)

Neobisium seminudum (Daday & Tömösváry, 1880)

Neobisium settei Callaini, 1982

Neobisium simile (L. Koch, 1873)

Neobisium simoni (L. Koch, 1873)

Neobisium speluncarium (Beier, 1928)

Neobisium strausaki Vachon, 1976

Neobisium sublaeve (E. Simon, 1879)

Neobisium sylvaticum (C.L. Koch, 1835)

Neobisium tarae Ćurčić, Dimitrijević, Tomić & Mitic, 2007

Neobisium theisianum (Gervais, 1844)

Neobisium tothi Novák, 2017

Neobisium trentinum Beier, 1931

Neobisium usudi Curcic, 1988

Neobisium validum (L. Koch, 1873)

Neobisium ventalloi Beier, 1939

Neobisium vignai Gardini, 2023

Neobisium yozgati Ćurčić & Seyyar, 2009

=== subgenus Neoccitanobisium ===
Neobisium ligusticum (Callaini, 1981)

=== subgenus Ommatoblothrus ===
Neobisium achaemenidum Nassirkhani & Mumladze, 2018

Neobisium baenai Carabajal Márquez, García Carrillo & Rodríguez Fernández, 2011

Neobisium battonii Beier, 1966

Neobisium bessoni Heurtault, 1979

Neobisium cerrutii Beier, 1955

Neobisium epirensis Henderickx & Vets, 2000

Neobisium espinoi Carabajal Márquez, García Carrillo & Rodríguez Fernández, 2011

Neobisium gaditanum Mahnert, 1977

Neobisium gomezi Heurtault, 1979

Neobisium gracile Heurtault, 1979

Neobisium henroti Beier, 1956

Neobisium karmanae Nassirkhani, 2022

Neobisium lulense Gardini, 1982

Neobisium oenotricum Callaini, 1987

Neobisium pangaeum Gardini, 1985

Neobisium patrizii Beier, 1953

Neobisium paucedentatum Mahnert, 1982

Neobisium perezi Carabajal Márquez, García Carrillo & Rodríguez Fernández, 2011

Neobisium perezruizi Zaragoza & Pérez, 2013

Neobisium phaeacum Mahnert, 1973

Neobisium piquerae Carabajal Marquez, Garcia Carrillo & Rodriguez Fernandez, 2001

Neobisium rodrigoi Marquez, Carrillo & Fernandez, 2000

Neobisium samniticum Mahnert, 1980

Neobisium sardoum Beier, 1956

Neobisium schawalleri Henderickx, 2000

Neobisium spilianum Schawaller, 1985

Neobisium staudacheri Hadži, 1933
