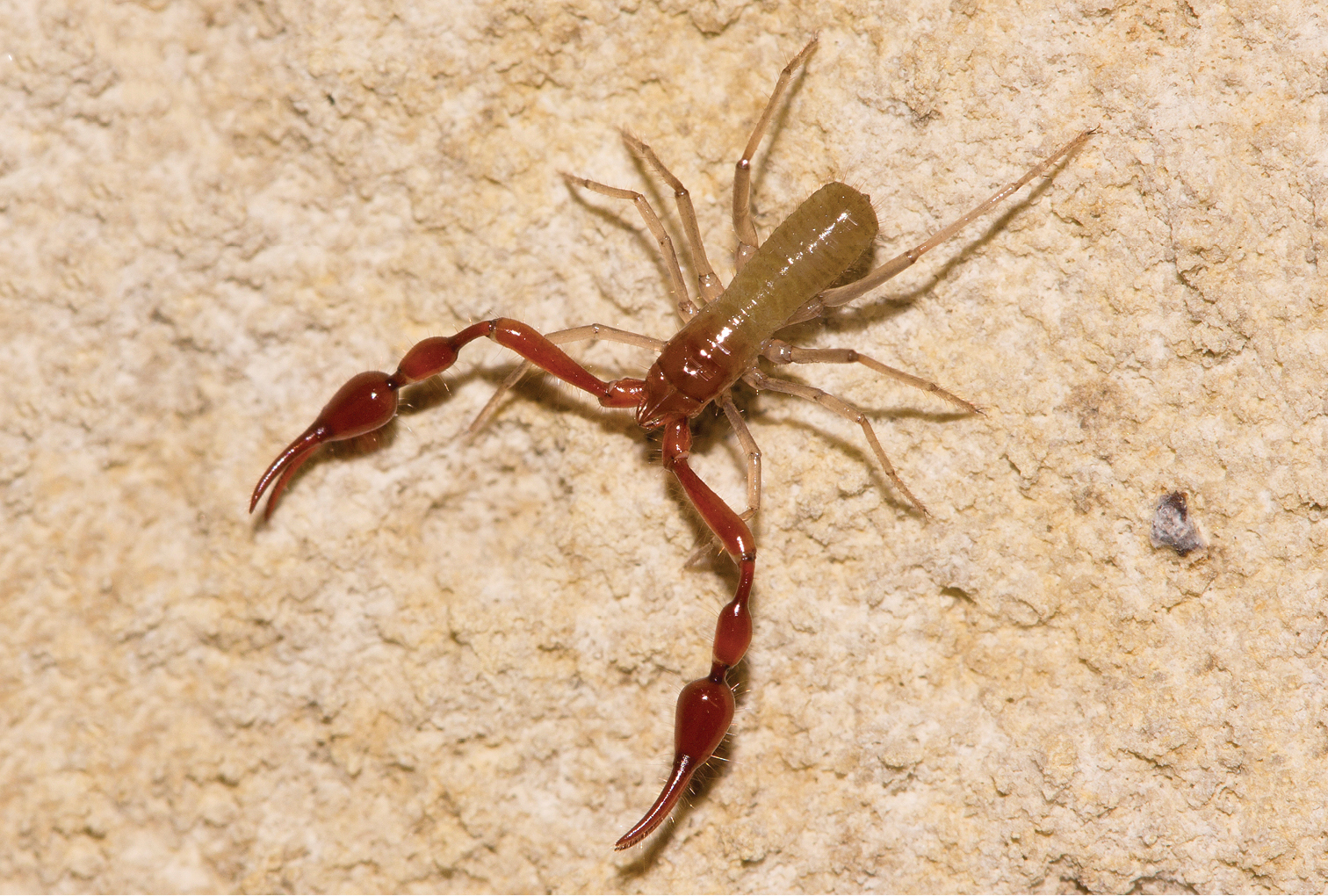
- Parobisium motianense

Scientific classification
- Kingdom: Animalia
- Phylum: Arthropoda
- Subphylum: Chelicerata
- Class: Arachnida
- Order: Pseudoscorpiones
- Family: Neobisiidae
- Genus: Parobisium; Chamberlin, 1930

= Parobisium =

Genus of arachnids

Parobisium is a genus of pseudoscorpions in the family Neobisiidae.

== Distribution ==
Species of this genus are found in East Asia and North America.

== Species ==
As of July 2024, Pseudoscorpions of the World (version 3.0) accepts the following species:

- Parobisium anagamidense (Morikawa, 1957)
- Parobisium charlotteae (Chamberlin, 1962)
- Parobisium flexifemoratum (Chamberlin, 1930)
- Parobisium hastatum (Schuster, 1966)
- Parobisium hesperum (Chamberlin, 1930)
- Parobisium hesternum (Schuster, 1966)
- Parobisium imperfectum (Chamberlin, 1930)
- Parobisium longipalpum (Hong, 1996)
- Parobisium magnum (Chamberlin, 1930)
- Parobisium robustiellum (Hong, 1996)
- Parobisium utahense (Muchmore, 1968)
- Parobisium vancleavei (Hoff, 1961)
- Parobisium yosemite (Cokendolpher & Krejca, 2010)
- Parobisium magangensis (Feng, Wynne & Zhang, 2019)
- Parobisium motianense (Feng, Wynne & Zhang, 2020)
- Parobisium qiangzhuang (Feng, Wynne & Zhang, 2020)
- Parobisium laevigatum (Zhang, Feng & Zhang, 2020)
- Parobisium muchonggouense (Zhang, Feng & Zhang, 2020)
- Parobisium petilum (Harvey & Cullen, 2020)
- Parobisium sanlouense (Feng, Wynne & Zhang, 2020)
- Parobisium tiani (Feng, Wynne & Zhang, 2020)
- Parobisium wangae (Guo & Zhang, 2016)
- Parobisium xiaowutaicum (Guo & Zhang, 2016)
- Parobisium yuantongi (Feng, Wynne & Zhang, 2019)

Parobisium martii , Parobisium scaurum and Parobisium titanium were placed in the genus Bisetocreagris by Mahnert and Li in 2016.
