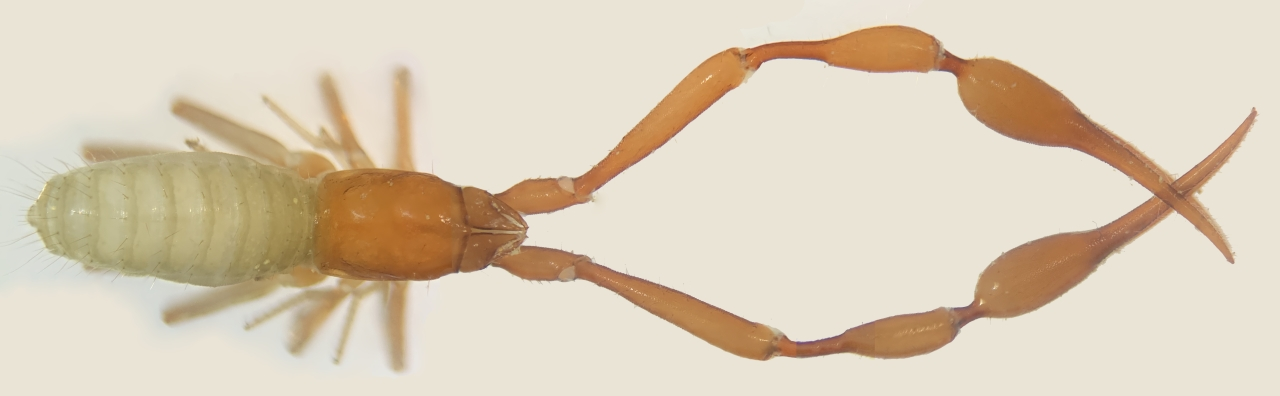

Scientific classification
- Kingdom: Animalia
- Phylum: Arthropoda
- Subphylum: Chelicerata
- Class: Arachnida
- Order: Pseudoscorpiones
- Family: Neobisiidae
- Genus: Acanthocreagris

= Acanthocreagris =

Genus of arachnids

Acanthocreagris is a genus in the family of pseudoscorpions called Neobisiidae. The genus was first described in 1974 by Volker Mahnert

== Taxonomy ==
Acanthocreagris contains the following species:

- Acanthocreagris lucifuga
- Acanthocreagris aelleni
- Acanthocreagris pyrenaica
- Acanthocreagris gallica
- Acanthocreagris corsa
- Acanthocreagris caspica
