= Microcreagris =

Scientific classification
- Domain: Eukaryota
- Kingdom: Animalia
- Phylum: Arthropoda
- Subphylum: Chelicerata
- Class: Arachnida
- Order: Pseudoscorpiones
- Family: Neobisiidae
- Genus: Microcreagris; Balzan, 1892

Genus of pseudoscorpions

Microcreagris is a genus of pseudoscorpions in the family Neobisiidae. It contains the following species:

- Microcreagris abnormis Turk, 1946
- Microcreagris atlantica Chamberlin, 1930
- Microcreagris birmanica Ellingsen, 1911
- Microcreagris californica (Banks, 1891)
- Microcreagris cingara Chamberlin, 1930
- Microcreagris ezoensis Morikawa, 1972
- Microcreagris formosana Ellingsen, 1912
- Microcreagris gigas Balzan, 1892
- Microcreagris grandis Muchmore, 1962
- Microcreagris herculea Beier, 1959
- Microcreagris hespera Chamberlin, 1930
- Microcreagris laurae Chamberlin, 1930
- Microcreagris luzonica Beier, 1931
- Microcreagris macropalpus Morikawa, 1955
- Microcreagris magna (Ewing, 1911)
- Microcreagris microdivergens Morikawa, 1955
- Microcreagris pseudoformosa Morikawa, 1955
- Microcreagris pusilla Beier, 1937
- Microcreagris sequoiae Chamberlin, 1930
- Microcreagris tacomensis (Ellingsen, 1909)
- Microcreagris thermophila Chamberlin, 1930
- Microcreagris xikangensis Guo and Fe. Zhang, 2016
