= Fissilicreagris =

Scientific classification
- Domain: Eukaryota
- Kingdom: Animalia
- Phylum: Arthropoda
- Subphylum: Chelicerata
- Class: Arachnida
- Order: Pseudoscorpiones
- Family: Neobisiidae
- Genus: Fissilicreagris; Ćurčić, 1984

Type species
- Fissilicreagris chamberlini (Beier, 1931)

Species
- 4, see text

Genus of pseudoscorpions

Fissilicreagris is a genus of pseudoscorpions in family Neobisiidae, first described by Božidar Ćurčić in 1984.

== Species ==
As of July 2022, the World Pseudoscorpiones Catalog accepts the following four species:

- Fissilicreagris chamberlini (Beier, 1931) — US (California)
- Fissilicreagris imperialis (Muchmore, 1969) — US (California)
- Fissilicreagris macilenta (Simon, 1878) — US (California)
- Fissilicreagris sanjosei Ćurčić, Dimitrijević, Makarov & Lučić, 1994 — US (California)
