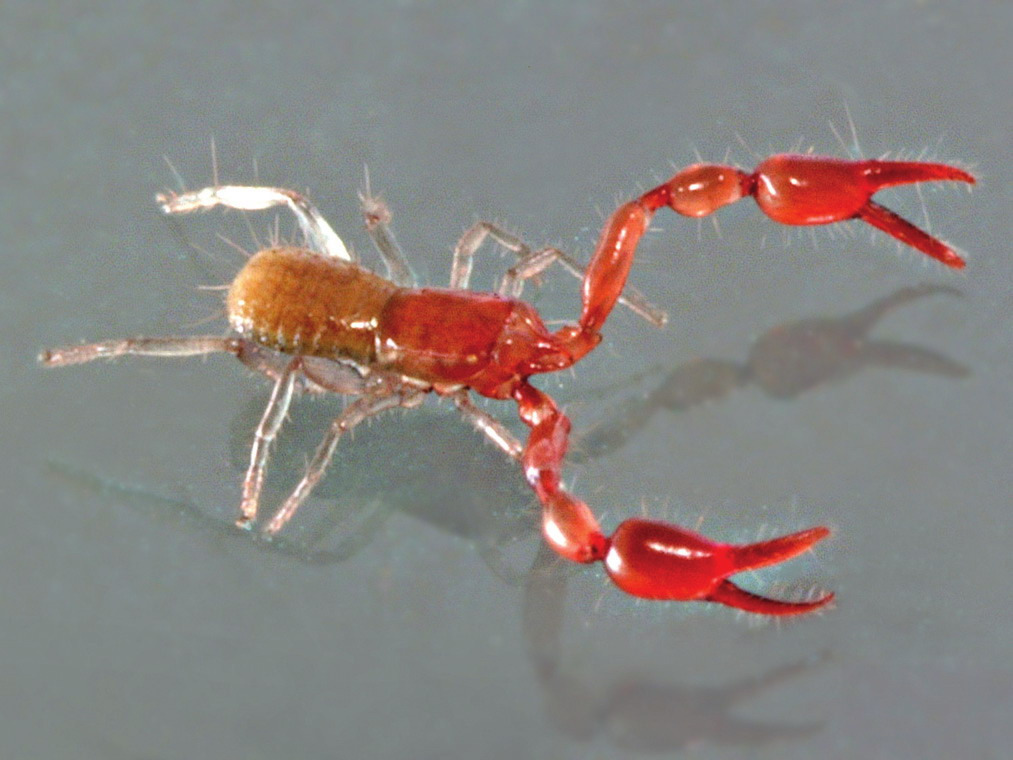
- Roncus elbulli

Scientific classification
- Kingdom: Animalia
- Phylum: Arthropoda
- Subphylum: Chelicerata
- Class: Arachnida
- Order: Pseudoscorpiones
- Family: Neobisiidae
- Subfamily: Neobisiinae
- Genus: Roncus; L. Koch, 1873

= Roncus =

Genus of arachnids

Roncus is a genus in the family of pseudoscorpions called Neobisiidae. The genus was first described in 1873 by Ludwig Carl Christian Koch.

== Systematics ==
There are at least 147 species in the Roncus genus.

Roncus abditus (J.C. Chamberlin, 1930) (Sardinia, Italy)

Roncus aetnensis Gardini & Rizzerio, 1987 (Sicily, Italy)

Roncus almissae Ćurčić, Radja, S. B. Ćurčić & N. B. Ćurčić, 2010 (Croatia)

Roncus alpinus L. Koch, 1873 (Austria and Italy)

Roncus andreinii (Caporiacco, 1925) (Italy)

Roncus anophthalmus (Ellingsen, 1910) (Bosnia & Hercegovina and Croatia)

Roncus antrorum (E. Simon, 1896) (Italy)

Roncus araxellus Schawaller & Dashdamirov, 1988 (Armenia)

Roncus argyrunti Ćurčić & Rađa, 2014 (Croatia)

Roncus assimilis Beier, 1931 (Italy)

Roncus babadochiae Ćurčić & Dimitrijević, 2006 (Romania)

Roncus baccettii Lazzeroni, 1969 (Sardinia, Italy)

Roncus barbei Vachon, 1964 (France)

Roncus bauk Curcic, 1991 (Serbia)

Roncus beieri Caporiacco, 1947 (Italy)

Roncus belbogi Curcic, Makarov & Lucic, 1998 (Montenegro)

Roncus bellesi Lagar, 1972 (Spain)

Roncus belluatii Gardini, 1992 (Croatia and Italy)

Roncus binaghii Gardini, 1991 (France and Italy)

Roncus birsteini Krumpál, 1986 (Georgia)

Roncus boneti Beier, 1931 (Spain)

Roncus bosniensis Ćurčić & Rađa, 2014 (Bosnia & Hercegovina)

Roncus caballeroi Lagar, 1974 (Spain)

Roncus cadinensis Zaragoza, 2007 (Spain)

Roncus caprai Gardini, 1993 (Italy)

Roncus caralitanus Gardini, 1981 (Sardinia, Italy)

Roncus carinthiacus Beier, 1934 (Austria)

Roncus carusoi Gardini & Rizzerio, 1987 (Sicily, Italy)

Roncus cassolai Beier, 1973 (Sardinia, Italy)

Roncus caucasicus (Beier, 1962) (Georgia)

Roncus cerberus (E. Simon, 1879) (France)

Roncus ciobanmos Curcic, Poinar & Sarbu, 1993 (Romania)

Roncus comasi Mahnert, 1985 (Tunisia)

Roncus corcyraeus Beier, 1963 (Corfu, Greece)

Roncus corimanus Beier, 1951 (Iran)

Roncus craciun Ćurčić & Dimitrijević, 2006 (Romania)

Roncus crassipalpus Rafalski, 1949 (Georgia)

Roncus crnobog Ćurčić, 2013 (Serbia)

Roncus dallaii Callaini, 1979 (Sardinia, Italy)

Roncus dalmatinus Hadži, 1933 (Croatia)

Roncus davor Curcic, Dimitrijevic & Makarov, 1997 (Montenegro)

Roncus dazbog Curcic & Legg, 1994 (North Macedonia)

Roncus decui Ćurčić & Dimitrijević, 2006 (Romania)

Roncus diocletiani Ćurčić, Dimitrijević, Radja & Radja, 2008 (Croatia)

Roncus dragobete Curcic, Poinar & Sarbu, 1993 (Romania)

Roncus drescoi Heurtault, 1986 (Spain)

Roncus duboscqi Vachon, 1937 (France and Spain)

Roncus elbulli Zaragoza & Henderickx, 2009 (Spain)

Roncus euchirus E. Simon, 1879 (Romania)

Roncus gardinii Heurtault, 1990 (Algeria)

Roncus gasparoi Mahnert & Gardini, 2014 (Kerkyra, Greece)

Roncus gestroi Beier, 1930 (Italy)

Roncus giachinoi Mahnert & Gardini, 2014 (Greece)

Roncus giganteus Mahnert, 1973 (Zakynthos, Greece)

Roncus golemanskyi Curcic, 2002 (Montenegro)

Roncus golijae Curcic, 1997 (Serbia)

Roncus grafittii Gardini, 1982 (Sardinia, Italy)

Roncus gruiae Ćurčić & Dimitrijević, 2006 (Serbia)

Roncus hajnehaj Ćurčić & Dimitrijević, 2009 (Montenegro)

Roncus hibericus Beier, 1939 (Spain)

Roncus hors Curcic, Dimitrijevic & Makarov, 1997 (Montenegro)

Roncus ingaunus Gardini, 1991 (Italy)

Roncus insularis Beier, 1938 (Croatia)

Roncus italicus E. Simon, 1896 (Croatia, Italy and Slovenia)

Roncus ivanjicae B.P.M. Curcic & S.B. Curcic, 1995 (Serbia)

Roncus ivansticae Ćurčić, 2012 (Serbia)

Roncus jagababa Curcic, 1988 (Slovenia)

Roncus jaoreci Curcic, 1984 (North Macedonia)

Roncus jarevid Ćurčić, 2013 (Serbia)

Roncus jarilo Curcic, 1992 (Serbia)

Roncus jelasnicae Ćurčić & Dimitrijević, 2009 (Serbia)

Roncus judsoni Henderickx & Zaragoza, 2005 (Spain)

Roncus julianus Caporiacco, 1949 (Austria and Italy)

Roncus juvencus Beier, 1939 (Spain)

Roncus khorasanicus Latifi, Nassirkhani & Mirshamsi, 2020 (Iran)

Roncus kikimora Curcic & Legg, 1994 (North Macedonia)

Roncus krupanjensis Ćurčić, Radja, S. B. Ćurčić & N. B. Ćurčić, 2010 (Serbia)

Roncus ladestani Dimitrijević & Ćurčić, 2021 (Lastovo Island, Croatia)

Roncus lagari Beier, 1972 (Spain)

Roncus leonidae Beier, 1942 (Italy)

Roncus liebegotti Schawaller, 1981 (Greece)

Roncus ligusticus Beier, 1930 (Italy)

Roncus lonai Caporiacco, 1949 (Albania)

Roncus lubricus L. Koch, 1873 (Albania, Algeria, Austria, Belgium, Bosnia & Herzegovina, Bulgaria, Croatia, Czech Republic, France, Germany, Greece, Hungary, Ireland, Italy, Malta, Morocco, Netherlands, Portugal, Romania, Saint Helena, Serbia, Slovakia, Slovenia, Spain, Switzerland, USA, Ukraine and United Kingdom)

Roncus meledae Ćurčić & Rađa, 2012 (Croatia)

Roncus melitensis Gardini & Rizzerio, 1987 (Malta)

Roncus melloguensis Gardini, 1982 (Sardinia, Italy)

Roncus menozzii (Caporiacco, 1923) (Italy)

Roncus microphthalmus (Daday, 1889) (Azerbaijan, Georgia, Iran, Russia and Turkey)

Roncus montsenyensis Zaragoza & Stahlavsky, 2007 (Spain)

Roncus narentae Dimitrijević & Rađa, 2009 (Croatia)

Roncus navalia Ćurčić & Rađa, 2012 (Pag Island, Croatia)

Roncus negreae Ćurčić & Dimitrijević, 2006 (Montenegro)

Roncus neotropicus Redikorzev, 1937 (Balearic Islands, Spain)

Roncus novus Beier, 1931 (Crete, Greece)

Roncus numidicus Callaini, 1983 (Algeria)

Roncus orao Curcic, Dimitrijevic, S.B. Curcic & Mitic, 2004 (Montenegro)

Roncus orjensis Ćurčić, Dimitrijević, Radja & Radja, 2008 (Montenegro)

Roncus pannonius Curcic, Dimitrijevic & Karamata, 1992 (Serbia)

Roncus pantici Ćurčić & Dimitrijević, 2004 (Serbia)

Roncus paolettii Mahnert, 1980 (Italy)

Roncus parablothroides Hadži, 1938 (Azerbaijan, Bulgaria, Dodecanese Islands (Greece), North Macedonia, Serbia and Turkey)

Roncus paulipetrou Ćurčić, 2011 (Bosnia & Hercegovina)

Roncus pecmliniensis Ćurčić & Rađa, 2021 (Croatia)

Roncus peissensis Ćurčić, Lemaire, S.B. Ćurčić, Dimitrijević, Milinčić & Pecelj, 2010 (France)

Roncus pemlinciensis Ćurčić & Rađa, 2021 (Bosnia & Hercegovina)

Roncus peramae Helversen, 1969 (Greece)

Roncus pieperi Mahnert & Gardini, 2014 (Kefalonia, Greece)

Roncus pljakici Curcic, 1973 (Serbia)

Roncus podaga Curcic, 1988 (Croatia)

Roncus pripegala Curcic, 1988 (Croatia)

Roncus puddui Mahnert, 1976 (Sardinia, Italy)

Roncus pugnax Navás, 1918 (mainland Spain and Balearic Islands, France and could be introduced to Argentina)

Roncus radgost Ćurčić, 2013 (Serbia)

Roncus radji Ćurčić, Radja, S. B. Ćurčić And N. B. Ćurčić, 2010 (Serbia)

Roncus ragusae Ćurčić & Rađa, 2012 (Croatia)

Roncus rajkodimitrijevici Ćurčić, 2006 (Serbia)

Roncus remesianensis Curcic, 1981 (Serbia)

Roncus remyi Beier, 1934 (France)

Roncus rujevit Curcic & Legg, 1994 (North Macedonia)

Roncus sandalioticus Gardini, 1982 (Sardinia, Italy)

Roncus sardous Beier, 1955 (Sardinia, Italy)

Roncus satoi Curcic & Dimitrijevic, 1994 (Serbia)

Roncus setosus Zaragosa, 1982 (Spain)

Roncus siculus Beier, 1963 (Sicily, Italy)

Roncus sotirovi Curcic, 1982 (Serbia)

Roncus stankokaramani Curcic & Dimitrijevic, 2001 (North Macedonia)

Roncus starivlahi Curcic, 1998 (Serbia)

Roncus strahor Curcic, 1993 (Serbia)

Roncus stussineri E. Simon, 1881 (Croatia and Slovenia)

Roncus sumadijae Ćurčić, 2012 (Serbia)

Roncus sutikvae B. P. M. Ćurčić, Rađa, Dimitrijević, Vesović, N. B. Ćurčić & S. B. Ćurčić, 2021 (Croatia)

Roncus svanteviti Curcic, 1992 (Serbia)

Roncus svarozici Curcic, 1992 (Serbia)

Roncus svetavodae Curcic & Dimitrijevic, 2002 (Serbia)

Roncus svilajae Dimitrijević & Rađa, 2009 (Croatia)

Roncus tabacarui Ćurčić & Dimitrijević, 2006 (Romania)

Roncus talason Curcic, Lee & Makarov, 1993 (Serbia)

Roncus tenuis Hadži, 1933 (Austria and Croatia)

Roncus teutae Ćurčić, 2014 (Montenegro)

Roncus timacensis Curcic, 1981 (Serbia)

Roncus tintilin Curcic, 1993 (Serbia)

Roncus transsilvanicus Beier, 1928 (Poland and Slovakia)

Roncus travuniensis Ćurčić & Dimitrijević, 2007 (Bosnia & Hercegovina)

Roncus tribunus Ćurčić, 2014 (Bosnia & Hercegovina)

Roncus troglophilus Beier, 1931 (Italy)

Roncus trojan Curcic, 1993 (Serbia)

Roncus trojanicus Ćurčić, 1988 (Croatia)

Roncus tuberculatus Gardini, 1991 (Italy)

Roncus turresi Dimitrijević, 2021 (Serbia)

Roncus turritanus Gardini, 1982 (Sardinia, Italy)

Roncus ursi Ćurčić, 2012 (Serbia)

Roncus veles Curcic & Legg, 1994 (North Macedonia)

Roncus vidali Lagar, 1972 (Mallorca, Spain)

Roncus virovensis Curcic & Dimitrijevic, 2002 (Serbia)

Roncus vitalei Curcic, 2003 (Serbia)

Roncus viti Mahnert, 1974 (Iran)

Roncus yaginumai B.P.M. Curcic, S.B. Curcic & Dimitrijevic, 1996 (Montenegro)

Roncus zburatorul Ćurčić, Dimitrijević, Radja & Radja, 2008 (Romania)

Roncus zeumos Ćurčić & Dimitrijević, 2006 (Romania)

Roncus zoiai Gardini & Rizzerio, 1987 (Sardinia, Italy)
