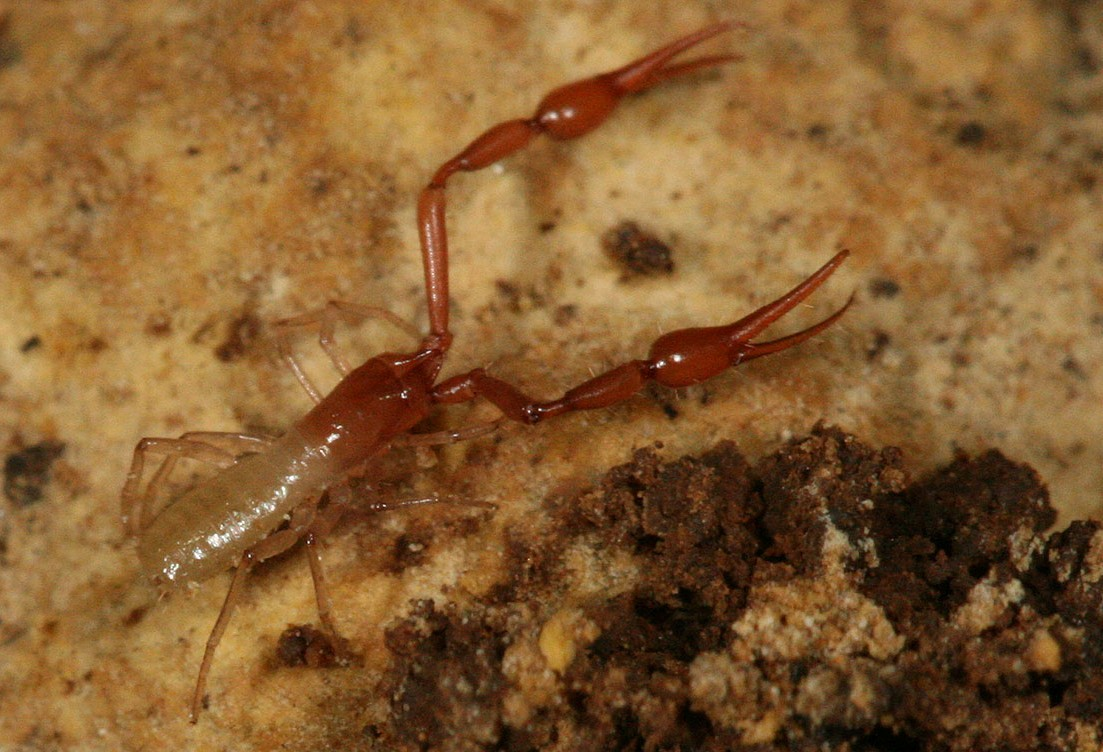
- Tartarocreagris texana

Scientific classification
- Domain: Eukaryota
- Kingdom: Animalia
- Phylum: Arthropoda
- Subphylum: Chelicerata
- Class: Arachnida
- Order: Pseudoscorpiones
- Family: Neobisiidae
- Genus: Tartarocreagris; Curcic, 1984

= Tartarocreagris =

Genus of pseudoscorpions

Tartarocreagris is a genus of pseudoscorpions in the family Neobisiidae. It contains the following species:

- Tartarocreagris altimana Muchmore, 2001
- Tartarocreagris amblyopa Muchmore, 2001
- Tartarocreagris attenuata Muchmore, 2001
- Tartarocreagris comanche Muchmore, 1992
- Tartarocreagris cookei Muchmore, 2001
- Tartarocreagris domina Muchmore, 2001
- Tartarocreagris grubbsi Muchmore, 2001
- Tartarocreagris hoodensis Muchmore, 2001
- Tartarocreagris infernalis (Muchmore, 1969)
- Tartarocreagris intermedia Muchmore, 1992
- Tartarocreagris ozarkensis (Hoff, 1945)
- Tartarocreagris proserpina Muchmore, 2001
- Tartarocreagris reyesi Muchmore, 2001
- Tartarocreagris texana (Muchmore, 1969)
