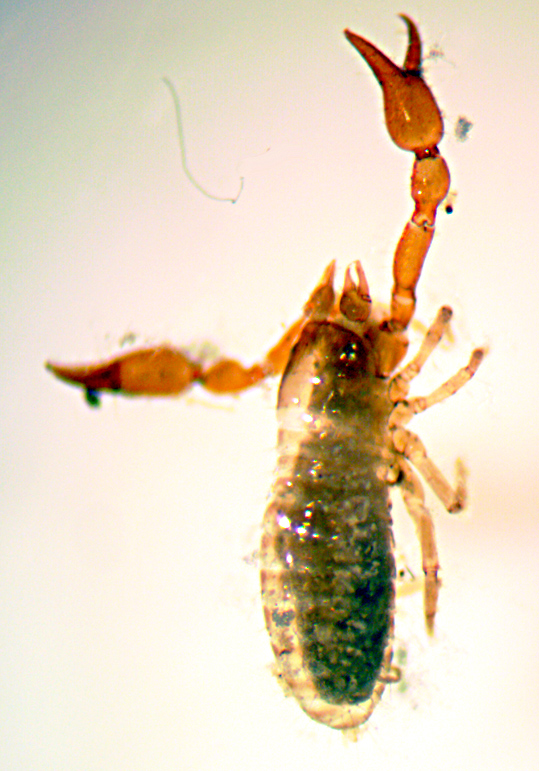
- Microbisium parvulum

Scientific classification
- Kingdom: Animalia
- Phylum: Arthropoda
- Subphylum: Chelicerata
- Class: Arachnida
- Order: Pseudoscorpiones
- Family: Neobisiidae
- Subfamily: Neobisiinae
- Genus: Microbisium; J. C. Chamberlin, 1930

Synonyms
- Afrobisium Beier, 1932; Nepalobisium Beier, 1974

= Microbisium =

Genus of pseudoscorpions

Microbisium is a genus of pseudoscorpions in the family Neobisiidae. There are about 12 described species in Microbisium.

== Species ==
These 12 species belong to the genus Microbisium:

- Microbisium brevifemoratum (Ellingsen, 1903)^{i c g}
- Microbisium brevipalpe (Redikorzev, 1922)^{i c g}
- Microbisium brunneum (Hagen, 1868)^{i c g b}
- Microbisium congicum Beier, 1955^{i c g}
- Microbisium dogieli (Redikorzev, 1924)^{i c g}
- Microbisium fagetum Cîrdei, Bulimar and Malcoci, 1967^{i c g}
- Microbisium lawrencei Beier, 1964^{i c g}
- Microbisium manicatum (L. Koch, 1873)^{i c g}
- Microbisium parvulum (Banks, 1895)^{i c g b}
- Microbisium pygmaeum (Ellingsen, 1907)^{i c g}
- Microbisium suecicum Lohmander, 1945^{i c g}
- Microbisium zariquieyi (Navás, 1919)^{i c g}

Data sources: i = ITIS, c = Catalogue of Life, g = GBIF, b = Bugguide.net
