= Talus cave =

Type of cave

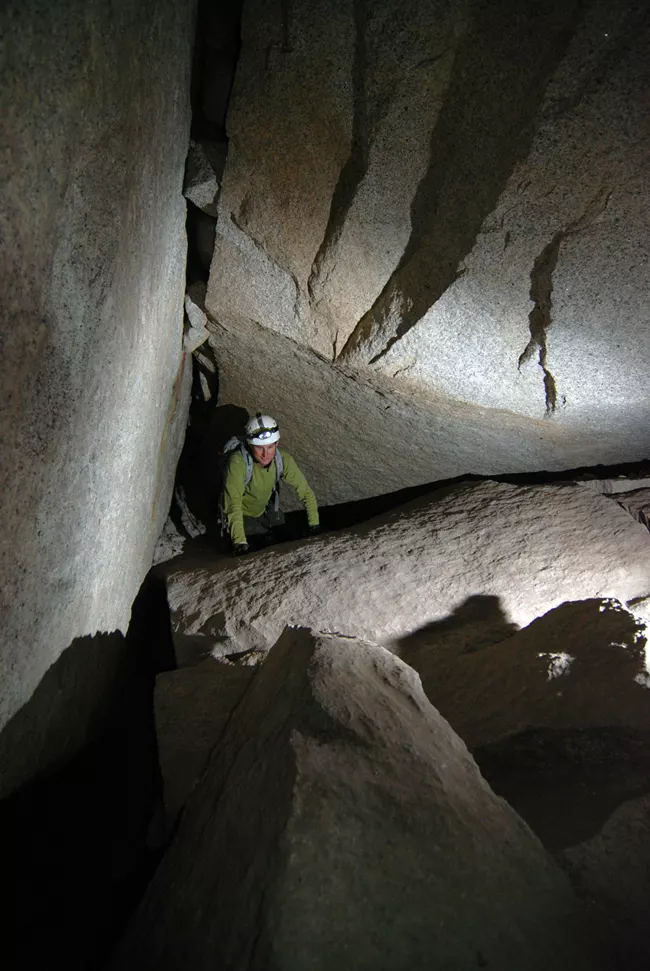
A talus cave in Yosemite National Park, California

A talus cave, also known as a boulder cave, is a type of cave formed by the gaps between one or, more commonly, many large boulders. Talus caves can be formed anywhere large boulders accumulate in a pile, such as in scree at the base of a cliff.

== Formation ==
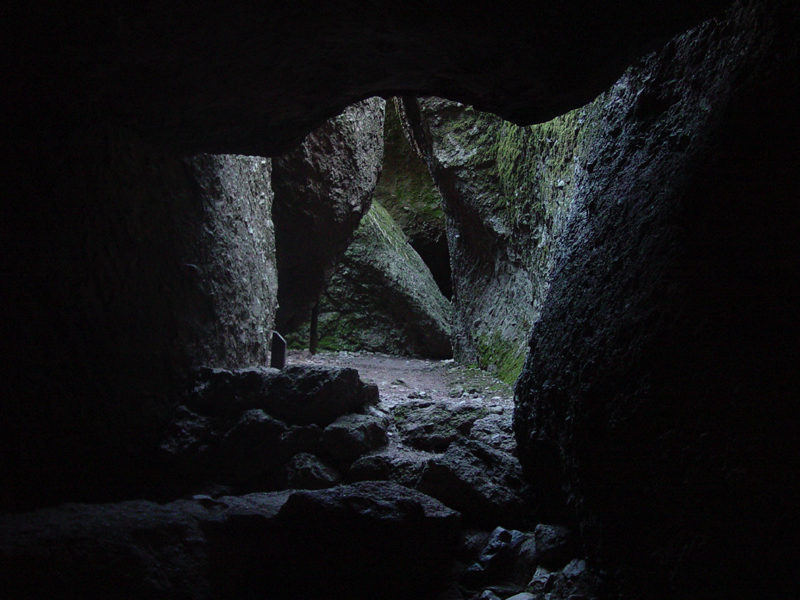
Bear Gulch Cave in Pinnacles National Park, California

Talus caves are formed anywhere with a sufficient accumulation of large rocky material, and thus form in a wide variety of rock—in New England, talus caves have been found in anorthosite, schist, slate, phyllite, conglomerate, marble and sandstone. Nevertheless, talus caves are more likely to form around outcrops of highly competent rock, such as granite or gneiss, which break cleanly along fractures.

The exact mechanism of talus cave formation differs with geological context. Along at the bottom of cliff faces, talus caves are primarily created from the mass movement of rock due to slope failure, usually through landslides creating scree deposits which contain the caves. In steep-sided gorges, talus caves may form as a combination of slope failure and downcutting by a stream or river, where smaller rocks and soil is washed away under large boulders, leaving a cave behind.

In Scandinavia and other recently glaciated areas, many talus caves are the result of neotectonic activity due to post-glacial rebound. These caves are found in fractured roche moutonnée hills, where strong neotectonic earthquakes created large systems of fractures and caves.

Several features on Mars have been found to resemble terrestrial scree, giving rise to the possibility of extraterrestrial talus caves.

== Characteristics ==
Talus caves are usually short, although the longest have up to several kilometers of explorable passages. Examples of long talus caves include Bodagrottorna in Hälsingland, Sweden, with 2,600 metres (8,500 ft) of passage, the Touchy Sword of Damocles cave in New York, United States with over 4,000 metres (13,000 ft) of passage, and Merrills-Barn Door-And-The Hole-Scotts (MBDATHS) cave in Vermont, with 640 metres (2,100 ft) of passage. Nevertheless, due to the complex, labyrinthine nature of larger talus caves the true length of many systems is unknown.

Although talus caves are poorly studied compared to other types of caves, in areas not conducive to the formation of solutional caves or lava tubes they may be the most common type of cave. Some talus caves in the Northeastern United States are ice caves, with perennial ice deposits inside the cave passages. Talus caves are important habitats for bats and troglofauna, such as the pseudoscorpion Parobisium yosemite which is endemic to talus caves in Yosemite National Park. A few talus caves have been turned into show caves, such as the caves in the Lost River Reservation and Polar Caves Park in New Hampshire, and the caves in Pinnacles National Park in California.
