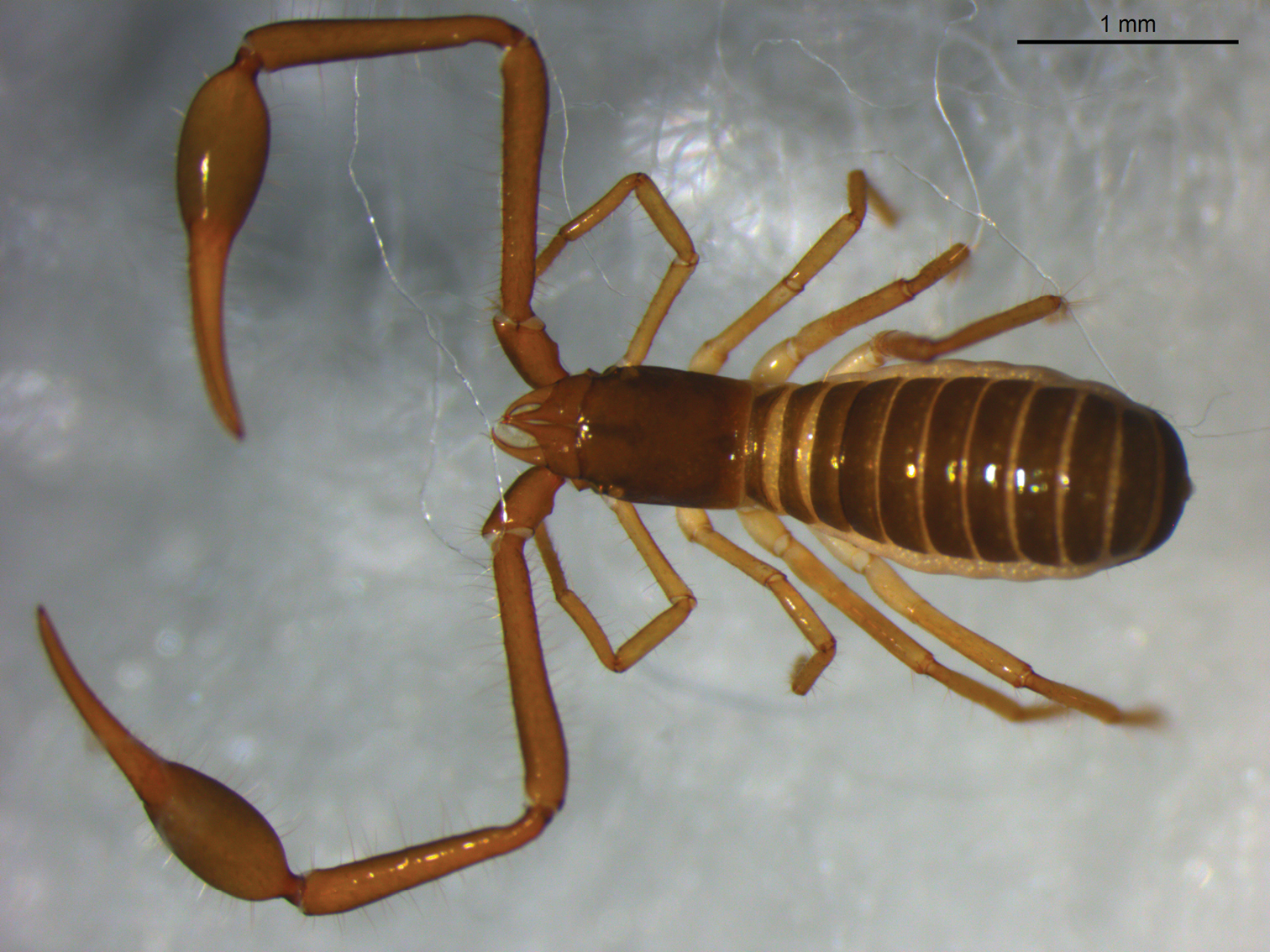
- Stenohya pengae

Scientific classification
- Kingdom: Animalia
- Phylum: Arthropoda
- Subphylum: Chelicerata
- Class: Arachnida
- Order: Pseudoscorpiones
- Superfamily: Neobisioidea
- Family: Neobisiidae; Chamberlin, 1930

= Neobisiidae =

Neobisiidae Temporal range: Cretaceous–present

Family of pseudoscorpions

Neobisiidae is a family of pseudoscorpions distributed throughout Africa, the Americas and Eurasia and consist of 748 species in 34 genera. Some species live in caves while some are surface-dwelling.

== Characteristics ==
The body color ranges from reddish or dark brown through olive green to yellow or creamy white. The legs are greenish. They usually have four eyes, but cave-dwelling species often have two or no eyes at all. The body length ranges from 1 to 5 mm.

Specimens of Neobisiidae have two very long pedipalps with palpal chelae (pincers) which strongly resemble the pincers found on true scorpions. The pedipalps consists of an immobile "hand" and "finger", with a separate movable finger controlled by an adductor muscle. Contrary to most other pseudoscorpions a venom gland and duct are located in the immobile "finger" part of each pedipalp, rather than in the movable one. The venom is used to capture and immobilize the prey.

== Genera ==
As of November 2023, the World Pseudoscorpiones Catalog accepts the following thirty-four genera:

- Acanthocreagris Mahnert, 1974
- Alabamocreagris Ćurčić, 1984
- Americocreagris Ćurčić, 1982
- Australinocreagris Ćurčić, 1984
- Balkanoroncus Ćurčić, 1975
- Bisetocreagris Ćurčić, 1983
- Bituberoroncus Ćurčić, 2013
- Cornuroncus Nassirkhani, Zaragoza & Mumladze, 2019
- Cryptocreagris Ćurčić, 1984
- Dentocreagris Dashdamirov, 1997
- Echinocreagris Dashdamirov, 2012
- Ernstmayria Ćurčić & Dimitrijević, 2006
- Fissilicreagris Ćurčić, 1984
- Globocreagris Ćurčić, 1984
- Halobisium Chamberlin, 1930
- Insulocreagris Ćurčić, 1987
- Lissocreagris Ćurčić, 1981
- Microbisium Chamberlin, 1930
- Microcreagris Balzan, 1892
- Minicreagris Ćurčić, 1989
- Neobisium Chamberlin, 1930
- Novobisium Muchmore, 1967
- Occitanobisium Heurtault, 1978
- Orientocreagris Ćurčić, 1985
- Paedobisium Beier, 1939
- Parobisium Chamberlin, 1930
- Roncobisium Vachon, 1967
- Roncocreagris Mahnert, 1974
- Roncus L. Koch, 1873
- Saetigerocreagris Ćurčić, 1984
- Stenohya Beier, 1967
- Tartarocreagris Ćurčić, 1984
- Trisetobisium Ćurčić, 1982
- Tuberocreagris Ćurčić, 1978
