= List of lakes of New Hampshire =

This is a list of lakes and ponds in the U.S. state of New Hampshire. The New Hampshire Department of Environmental Services lists 944 lakes and impoundments in their Official List of Public Waters. The water bodies that are listed include natural lakes and reservoirs, including areas on rivers impounded behind dams.

Wikipedia articles have been written about the following New Hampshire lakes. Swimming, fishing, and/or boating are permitted in some of these lakes, but not all.

Lake	Town(s) or city	Area (acres)	Area (hectares)	Type
Akers Pond	Errol	276.3	111.8	Lake
Armington, Lake	Piermont	152.2	61.6	Lake
Arlington Mill Reservoir	Salem	268.6	108.7	Reservoir
Ashuelot Pond	Washington	367.8	148.9	Lake
Ayers Island Reservoir	Bristol, Bridgewater, New Hampton	500.0	202.3	Reservoir
Baboosic Lake	Amherst, Merrimack	228.5	92.5	Lake
Back Lake	Pittsburg	347.7	140.1	Lake
Balch Pond/Stump Pond	Wakefield, NH; Newfield, ME; Acton, ME	570.7	230.9	Lake
Baxter Lake	Farmington, Rochester	302.1	122.3	Lake
Bellamy Reservoir	Madbury, Dover	382.2	154.7	Reservoir
Bow Lake	Strafford, Northwood	1,160.7	469.7	Lake
Broad Bay	Freedom, Effingham	463.8	187.7	Lake
Canaan Street Lake	Canaan	303.0	122.6	Lake
Canobie Lake	Windham, Salem	373.4	151.1	Lake
Cedar Pond	Milan	78	32	Lake
Chocorua Lake	Tamworth	222	90	Lake
Christine Lake	Stark	197	80	Lake
Cobbetts Pond	Windham	302.1	122.3	Lake
Comerford Reservoir	Monroe, NH; Littleton, NH; Barnet, VT; Waterford, VT	1,093.0	442.3	Reservoir
Contoocook Lake	Jaffrey, Rindge	322.9	130.7	Lake
Conway Lake	Conway, Eaton	1,299.0	525.7	Lake
Country Pond	Kingston, Newton	255.0	103.2	Lake
Crystal Lake	Enfield	404.4	163.7	Lake
Crystal Lake	Gilmanton	440.9	178.4	Lake
Crystal Lake	Manchester	18.6	7.5	Lake
Dan Hole Pond	Ossipee, Tuftonboro	443.3	179.4	Lake
Deering Reservoir	Deering	315.4	127.6	Reservoir
Dublin Pond	Dublin	240	97	Lake
Eastman Pond	Grantham, Enfield	335.0	135.6	Reservoir
Echo Lake	Franconia	38.2	15.5	Lake
Echo Lake	Conway	15.7	6.4	Lake
First Connecticut Lake	Pittsburg	3,071.0	1,242.8	Reservoir
Fourth Connecticut Lake	Pittsburg	1.8	0.74	Lake
Lake Francis (Murphy Dam)	Pittsburg, Clarksville	1,933.8	782.6	Reservoir
Franklin Pierce Lake	Hillsborough, Antrim	483.4	195.6	Reservoir
Goose Pond	Canaan, Hanover	624.6	252.8	Lake
Grafton Pond	Grafton	321.0	129.9	Lake
Granite Lake	Nelson, Stoddard	232.5	94.1	Lake
Great East Lake	Wakefield, NH; Acton, ME	1,829.6	740.4	Lake
Great Pond	Kingston	268.0	108.5	Lake
Greenough Pond	Wentworth Location	234	95	Lake
Halfmoon Lake	Barnstead, Alton	282.4	114.3	Lake
Harrisville Pond	Harrisville	138	56	Lake
Highland Lake	Stoddard, Washington	712.0	288.1	Reservoir
Hopkins Pond (Adder Pond)	Andover	27	11	Lake
Horn Pond	Wakefield, NH; Acton, ME	227	92	Lake
Island Pond	Stoddard	179	72	Lake
Island Pond	Derry, Hampstead, Atkinson	531.6	215.1	Lake
Lake Ivanhoe	Wakefield	68	28	Lake
Jenness Pond	Northwood, Pittsfield	266.9	108.0	Lake
Knowles Pond	Northfield	55	22	Reservoir
Knowles Pond	North Hampton	1.2	0.5	Pond
Lake Kanasatka	Moultonborough	371.0	150.1	Lake
Lakes of the Clouds	Sargent's Purchase	0.6	0.24	Lakes
Little Squam Lake	Ashland, Holderness	408.1	165.1	Lake
Little Sunapee Lake	New London, Springfield	472.0	191.0	Lake
Locke Lake	Barnstead	149	60	Lake
Lonesome Lake	Lincoln	12.2	4.9	Lake
Lovell Lake	Wakefield	538.0	217.7	Lake
Mascoma Lake	Enfield, Lebanon	1,165.3	471.6	Reservoir
Massabesic Lake	Auburn, Manchester	2,561.4	1,036.6	Lake
Lake Massasecum	Bradford	401.7	162.6	Lake
McIndoes Reservoir	Monroe, NH; Barnet, VT	545.0	220.6	Reservoir
Mendums Pond	Barrington, Nottingham	252.7	102.3	Lake
Merrymeeting Lake	New Durham	1,233.0	499.0	Reservoir
Milton Pond	Milton, NH; Lebanon, ME	270.5	109.5	Lake
Mirror Lake	Tuftonboro	332.8	134.7	Lake
Monomonac, Lake	Rindge, NH; Winchendon, MA	593.8	240.3	Lake
Moore Reservoir	Littleton, NH, Dalton, NH; Waterford, VT; Concord, VT	3,490.0	1,412.3	Reservoir
Newfound Lake	Bristol, Hebron, Alexandria	4,450.7	1,801.2	Lake
Northeast Pond	Milton, NH; Lebanon, ME; Acton, ME	682.7	276.4	Lake
Northwood Lake	Northwood, Epsom	653.0	264.3	Lake
Nubanusit Lake	Nelson, Hancock	715.0	289.3	Lake
Opechee Bay	Laconia	449.0	181.7	Reservoir
Ossipee Lake	Ossipee, Freedom	3,245.3	1,313.4	Lake
Paugus Bay	Laconia	1,220.0	493.7	Bay
Pawtuckaway Lake	Nottingham	783.4	317.0	Reservoir
Pearly Lake	Rindge	191.5	77.5	Lake
Pemigewasset Lake	New Hampton, Meredith	255.8	103.5	Lake
Penacook Lake	Concord	360.0	145.7	Lake
Pequawket Ponds	Albany, Conway, Madison	140.0	56.6	Reservoir
Pillsbury Lake	Webster	45	18	Lake
Pine River Pond	Wakefield	570.4	230.8	Lake
Pleasant Lake	Deerfield	479.0	193.8	Lake
Pleasant Lake	New London	606.0	245.2	Lake
Pontook Reservoir	Dummer	280.0	113.3	Reservoir
Potanipo Pond	Brookline	136.2	55.1	Lake
Powder Mill Pond	Bennington, Hancock, Greenfield	435.0	176.0	Reservoir
Powwow Pond	Kingston, East Kingston	285.3	115.5	Lake
Profile Lake	Franconia	13	5.3	Lake
Province Lake	Wakefield, NH; Effingham, NH; Parsonsfield, ME	967.1	391.4	Lake
Sandogardy Pond	Northfield	37	14.97338	Lake
Sebbins Pond	Bedford	20	8.1	Lake
Second Connecticut Lake	Pittsburg	1,102.1	446.0	Reservoir
Shaker Ponds	Canterbury	Unknown	Unknown	Reservoir
Silver Lake	Harrisville, Nelson	332.7	134.6	Lake
Silver Lake	Hollis	39	16	Lake
Silver Lake	Madison	969.4	392.3	Lake
Skatutakee Lake	Harrisville	228	92	Lake
Solitude, Lake	Newbury	4.6	1.9	Lake
Spofford Lake	Chesterfield	738.8	299.0	Lake
Squam Lake	Holderness, Center Harbor, Moultonborough, Sandwich	6,790.7	2,748.2	Lake
Stinson Lake	Rumney	350.0	141.6	Lake
Success Pond	Success	290.0	117.4	Lake
Sunapee, Lake	Sunapee, New London, Newbury	4,136.2	1,673.9	Lake
Suncook Lakes	Barnstead	697.0	282.1	Reservoir
Sunrise Lake	Middleton	256.9	104.0	Lake
Sunset Lake	Alton, Gilmanton	252.7	102.3	Lake
Surry Mountain Lake	Surry	265.0	107.2	Reservoir
Swains Lake	Barrington	348.8	141.2	Lake
Tarleton, Lake	Piermont, Warren	334.3	135.3	Lake
Third Connecticut Lake	Pittsburg	231	93	Lake
Thorndike Pond	Jaffrey, Dublin	248.7	100.6	Lake
Turkey Ponds	Concord	339.0	137.2	Lakes
Tuxbury Pond	South Hampton, NH; Amesbury, MA	119	48	Lake
Umbagog Lake	Errol, NH; Cambridge, NH; Upton, ME; Magalloway, ME	7,538.9	3,051.0	Lake
Walker Pond	Boscawen, Webster	205	82.96063	Lake
Waukewan, Lake	Meredith, New Hampton	928.3	375.7	Lake
Weare Reservoir	Weare	279.1	113.0	Reservoir
Webster Lake	Franklin	612.0	247.7	Lake
Wentworth, Lake	Wolfeboro	3,115.6	1,260.9	Lake
White Oak Pond	Holderness	291.0	117.8	Lake
Wicwas, Lake	Meredith	350.1	141.7	Lake
Willard Pond	Antrim	108.0	44.0	Lake
Winnepocket, Lake	Webster	229	92.67309	Reservoir
Winnipesaukee, Lake	Laconia, Gilford, Meredith, Center Harbor, Moultonborough, Tuftonboro, Wolfeboro, Alton	44,586.0	18,043.1	Lake
Winnisquam, Lake	Tilton, Belmont, Sanbornton, Laconia, Meredith	4,237.5	1,714.9	Reservoir
