= Walker Pond (New Hampshire) =

Natural lake in the towns of Boscawen and Webster, New Hampshire

- Walker's Pond
- Satellite view of Walker Pond, courtesy of the USGS

- Location within New Hampshire Location within the United States
- Location: Webster, New Hampshire; Boscawen, New Hampshire
- Coordinates: 43°18′56″N 71°41′7″W
- Type: Lake
- Primary inflows: Beaverdam Brook
- Primary outflows: Pond Brook
- Basin countries: United States
- Surface area: 205 acres (83 ha)
- Max. depth: 44 ft (13 m)
- Surface elevation: 505 ft (154 m)
- Islands: 0
- Settlements: Swetts Mills; Dingit Corner

Walker Pond or Walker's Pond is a 205-acre (83 ha) lake near Lake Winnepocket in the towns of Boscawen and Webster, New Hampshire. It is 505 feet (154 m) above sea level, and has no islands. It is fed in the north by Beaverdam Brook, and it drains to the south into Pond Brook.

== History ==
Walker Pond, sometimes called Walker's Pond, was initially part of Boscawen until Webster became a separate town. Boscawen used their side of the lake for drinking water, but Webster did not. Webster has two access points, Walker Pond Road and Longver Lane, which allow many residents to come up to the lake. Boscawen only has an unmaintained Class VI road, Chadwick Hill Road, which leads to Walker Pond. Webster encourages recreation to the public, while Webster allows access to the pond only to residents of the area.

== Geography ==
Walker Pond is located between the towns of Boscawen and Webster in Merrimack County, New Hampshire. It is reached from Chadwick Hill Road in Boscawen, and from Walker Pond Road and Longver Lane in Webster. It is east of Lake Winnepocket and is surrounded mostly by marshes and forests.

== Hydrology ==
Walker Pond is fed in the north by Beaverdam Brook, which exits the pond in the south as Pond Brook. The lake is part of the Merrimack River watershed, with Pond Brook meeting Deer Meadow Brook, which merges with the Contoocook River, a tributary of the Merrimack River. The lake has a maximum depth of 44 feet (13 m) and a surface area of 205 acres (83 ha). Little Pond, a small marsh north of Walker Pond, is fed by Beaverdam Brook.

== Ecology ==
Walker Pond is home to various fish species, including chain pickerel, largemouth bass, and yellow perch. The pond is also home to various types of algae and is surrounded by wetlands. Walker Pond has no islands.

== Beaverdam Brook ==
Beaverdam Brook, one of Walker Pond's main inflows, is a long brook in the towns of Salisbury and Webster, New Hampshire. It rises in a small marsh in Salisbury Heights and flows south until it ends at Walker Pond.

== Pond Brook ==
Pond Brook is the outflow of Walker Pond, flowing southward from the southern end of the pond until it meets Deer Meadow Brook, a Contoocook River tributary, near Pillsbury Lake. It is a short brook, ending at Corn Hill Road in Webster.

== Recreation ==
Since Walker Pond is split between two towns, the regulations for visitors differ between the two sides. On the Boscawen side, recreation is strongly encouraged, with amenities like a boat launch. On the Webster side, everything is on private property, including the town's only boat launch, and is not open to the public.

== See also ==
- List of lakes of New Hampshire
- Contoocook River
- Webster, New Hampshire
- Boscawen, New Hampshire
