= Tom Padden =

American baseball player (1908–1973)

- Catcher
- Born: October 6, 1908; Manchester, New Hampshire, U.S.
- Died: June 10, 1973 (aged 64); Manchester, New Hampshire, U.S.
- Batted: Right Threw: Right

MLB debut
- May 29, 1932, for the Pittsburgh Pirates

Last MLB appearance
- July 22, 1943, for the Washington Senators

MLB statistics
- Batting average: .272
- Home runs: 2
- Runs batted in: 110
- Stats at Baseball Reference

Teams
- Pittsburgh Pirates (1932–1937); Philadelphia Phillies (1943); Washington Senators (1943)

Thomas Francis Padden (October 6, 1908 – June 10, 1973) was an American professional baseball player and manager. He played as a catcher in Major League Baseball (MLB) from 1932 to 1937 for the Pittsburgh Pirates. Padden returned to Major League Baseball in 1943 during the World War II manpower shortage to play for the Philadelphia Phillies and the Washington Senators.

== Baseball career ==
Padden was a native of Manchester, New Hampshire. He attended The College of the Holy Cross and graduated from Saint Anselm College. He began his professional baseball career in 1928 with his hometown Manchester Blue Sox. He made his Major League debut on May 29, 1932, at the age of 23, with the Pirates in a road game against the Chicago Cubs at Wrigley Field. His two best seasons were 1934, when he batted .321 in 82 games, and 1935, in which he had career-highs of 97 games played, 302 at bats, and 35 runs scored.

Career totals include a batting average of .272, 318 hits, including 40 doubles and two home runs, a .345 on-base percentage, 110 runs batted in, and 122 runs scored. His two home runs came off Al Smith of the New York Giants on August 26, 1935, and Al Hollingsworth of the Cincinnati Reds on August 7, 1936. He was an average defensive catcher for his era, with a lifetime fielding percentage of .977. Notable Pirate teammates who were future Baseball Hall of Fame members were Burleigh Grimes, Waite Hoyt, Freddie Lindstrom, Pie Traynor, Arky Vaughan, Lloyd Waner, and Paul Waner.

Padden spent the 1948 season as manager of his hometown Manchester Yankees of the Class B New England League, an affiliate of the New York Yankees. In 1949 he managed the Galt Terriers of the Inter-County League in southern Ontario. He also played occasionally. He managed the Terriers to a first-place finish, but his team lost to the Brantford Red Sox in seven games in the league's playoff semifinals.

He died in Manchester on June 10, 1973, at the age of 64 of a ruptured pancreas. He is buried in Saint Joseph Cemetery, Bedford, New Hampshire.
