= Crystal Lake (Manchester, New Hampshire) =

Lake in Manchester, New Hampshire

- Location within New Hampshire Location within the United States
- Location: Hillsborough County, New Hampshire
- Coordinates: 42°57′04″N 71°24′26″W
- Primary outflows: tributary of Cohas Brook
- Basin countries: United States
- Max. length: 0.3 mi (0.5 km)
- Max. width: 0.2 mi (0.3 km)
- Surface area: 21 acres (0.1 km^{2})
- Average depth: 10 ft (3.0 m)
- Max. depth: 20 ft (6.1 m)
- Surface elevation: 205 ft (62 m)
- Settlements: Manchester

Crystal Lake is a natural pond near Bodwell Road and Corning Road in south Manchester, New Hampshire, United States. Crystal Lake is a popular place for residents to enjoy swimming, boating and fishing.

== Geography ==
The lake lies near the southeastern corner of Manchester at an elevation somewhat over 200 feet (61 m) above sea level. The lake's outlet stream flows west to Cohas Brook, a tributary of the Merrimack River, which flows south and east to the Gulf of Maine and the Atlantic Ocean.

== History ==
Crystal Lake was historically known as Skenker's Pond and later as Mosquito Pond. In 1919, the city of Manchester built a public bathing area at the north end of the pond. The main entrance area consisted of a bathhouse and picnic grounds near the beach. The lake was the site of city-sponsored swim meets for children in the 1920s. Eventually, due to the lake's growing popularity, the facilities at Crystal Lake had to be expanded. In 1942 a new bathhouse was constructed and the beach was extended by the Works Progress Administration. In 1987, the fieldstone-constructed bathhouse underwent a renovation sponsored by the City Parks and Recreation Department and still stands at the site today.

=== Hermit of Mosquito Pond ===
The story of the Hermit of Mosquito Pond is about a man who lived secluded on Crystal Lake for 60 years. Charles Alan Lambert came to Manchester in the 1840s. After a slew of heartbreaks he retreated to the woods to live a life of solitude. He purchased over 40 acres (16 ha) of land, on which he built a house out of logs he found on the property. He also grew his own food and herbs. He used the herbs to barter with local apothecaries. Over the years his hermit lifestyle made him into a kind of local celebrity, and he became the object of great curiosity. Despite his secluded lifestyle he would be visited by hundreds of people every summer. Mr. Lambert lived at his hermit homestead for over 60 years, spending the last two years of his life with the Sisters of Mercy at the House of St. John for aged men. He died in 1914, and his body now lies in St. Joseph Cemetery marked by a plain white tombstone, inscribed "The Hermit".

== Fishing ==
The lake is classified as a warmwater fishery, with observed species including smallmouth bass, largemouth bass, chain pickerel, brown bullhead, and black crappie.

== See also ==
- List of lakes in New Hampshire
