= Lake Ivanhoe =

Lake Ivanhoe may refer to:

- Lake Ivanhoe (Florida), a body of water in Orlando, Florida
- Lake Ivanhoe (New Hampshire), a body of water
- Lake Ivanhoe, Wisconsin, a census-designated place

== See also ==
- Ivanhoe Lake, Ontario, Canada
