= Knowles Pond (Rockingham County) =

Pond in North Hampton, New Hampshire

- Location: North Hampton, New Hampshire
- Type: Pond
- Etymology: Knowles family
- Primary outflows: toward Cornelius Brook
- Basin countries: United States
- Max. length: 187 feet (57.0 m)
- Max. width: 252 feet (76.8 m)
- Islands: 0

Knowles Pond is a 1.2-acre (0.5 ha) pond in North Hampton, New Hampshire, United States. It is situated in the Knowles Field, and is not fed by any known water source. The pond drains to the north toward Cornelius Brook, a tributary of the Winnicut River and part of the watershed of Great Bay.

It is smaller and lesser-known than its Merrimack County counterpart. It is located near Post Road (New Hampshire Route 151) and Evergreen Drive. Its exact coordinates are at 42.98645° N, 70.84061° W, and it has a GNIS feature ID of 867906.

== See also ==
- List of lakes of New Hampshire
