= Locke Lake =

Lake in Barnstead, New Hampshire, United States

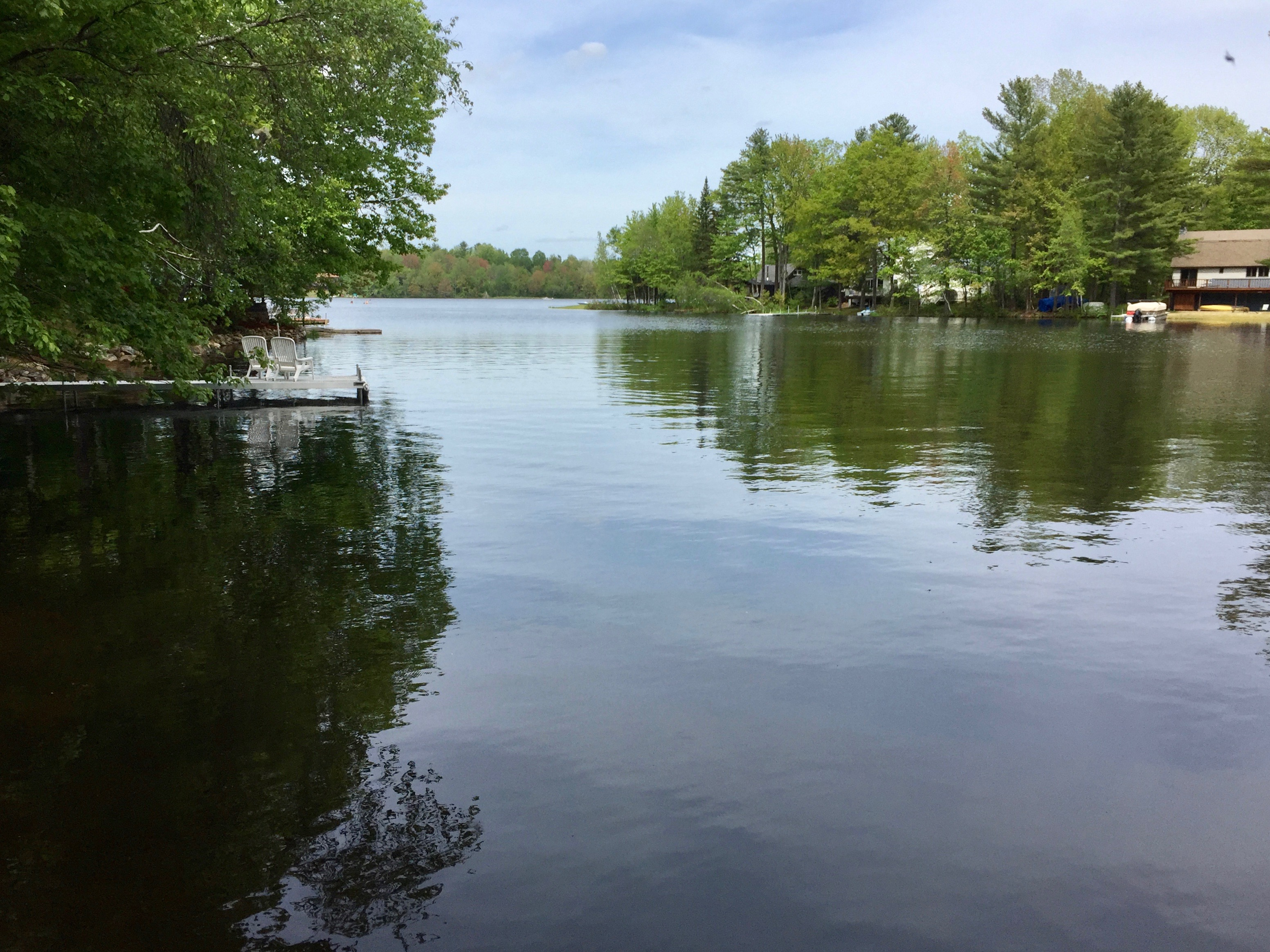
- View of Locke Lake from the outlet

- Location within New Hampshire Location within the United States
- Location: Barnstead, New Hampshire, Belknap County, New Hampshire, United States
- Coordinates: 43°23′12″N 71°13′55″W
- Type: Reservoir
- Primary inflows: Halfmoon Lake
- Primary outflows: tributary of Webster Stream
- Basin countries: United States
- Surface area: 149 acres (60 ha)
- Surface elevation: 640 ft (200 m)
- Settlements: Barnstead

Locke Lake is a 149-acre (60 ha) lake in the town of Barnstead, Belknap County, New Hampshire, United States. It is part of the Merrimack River watershed. The lake is surrounded by the Locke Lake Colony residential development, and there is no public access to the lake.

== Geography ==
Locke Lake lies within central New Hampshire's Lakes Region. The lake has a surface area of approximately 149 acres (60 ha) and an elevation of about 640 ft (200 m) above sea level. The lake receives inflow from Halfmoon Lake and drains through its outlet into Webster Stream, a south-flowing tributary of the Suncook River, which ultimately flows into the Merrimack River.

== Hydrology ==
Locke Lake is a relatively shallow lake with a maximum depth of approximately 3 m (9.8 ft) and a watershed area of roughly 2,039 acres (825 ha).

Because of its shallow depth and watershed characteristics, Locke Lake has been the subject of water-quality monitoring and nutrient studies conducted by the New Hampshire Department of Environmental Services.

== History ==
Locke Lake was created during the mid-20th century as part of the development of the surrounding residential area in Barnstead. Residential development around the lake began in the 1960s when the surrounding land was subdivided for housing.

== Ecology ==
Locke Lake has been monitored for water quality and aquatic vegetation as part of environmental management programs conducted by the New Hampshire Department of Environmental Services and local authorities.

The lake supports a warmwater fish community typical of small lakes in central New Hampshire, including sport fish such as largemouth bass.

== Recreation ==
Locke Lake is used for recreational activities including swimming, fishing, and small watercraft such as kayaks and canoes. Access to the lake is restricted because much of the shoreline is privately owned and associated with the surrounding residential development.

== See also ==
- List of lakes of New Hampshire
- Suncook River
