= Carbonfund.org =

US climate change organization

Carbonfund.org Foundation
- Founded: September 23, 2003; 23 years ago
- Tax ID no.: 20-0231609
- Legal status: 501(c)(3) nonprofit organization
- Headquarters: East Aurora, New York, United States
- Coordinates: 42°46′2.4″N 78°36′11.2″W
- Region served: Global
- Chairman: W. Paul Rowland
- President: Eric Carlson
- Subsidiaries: CarbonCo LLC
- Revenue: $3,948,248 (2014)
- Expenses: $3,141,374 (2014)
- Employees: 36 (2014)
- Website: web.archive.org/web/20070116195332/http://www.carbonfund.org/site/

The Carbonfund.org Foundation (known as Carbonfund.org) was formerly a 501(c)(3) not-for-profit organization based in East Aurora, New York. It provided carbon offsetting and greenhouse gas reduction options to individuals, businesses, and organizations. Carbonfund.org Foundation purchased and retired certified carbon offsets on behalf of its donors. Donors were given a choice of project type to which they might donate, including renewable energy, reforestation, and energy efficiency projects. Carbonfund.org Foundation sourced carbon credits verified by the Verra Verified Carbon Standard and Gold Standard. The organization helped develop four Reducing Emissions from Deforestation and Degradation (REDD+) projects in Brazil under the VERRA and Climate, Community and Biodiversity standards.

== Certification ==
Carbonfund.org Foundation exclusively supported projects certified by third parties, including Environmental Resources Trust, the Climate, Community & Biodiversity Alliance, Voluntary Carbon Standard and the Chicago Climate Exchange.

== Portfolio ==
Carbonfund.org Foundation supported three types of carbon projects: renewable energy, energy efficiency, and reforestation.

=== Reforestation ===
- Return to Forest Project

Certification: Climate, Community & Biodiversity Alliance CCBS "Gold Level"

- Tensas River Valley Reforestation Project

Verification: CCBS Gold, VCS

=== Renewable energy ===
- New Bedford Landfill Methane Project

Verification: Environmental Resources Trust

- Horse Hollow Wind Energy Center

Verification: Green-e Energy RECs

- Inland Biodigester Project

Verification: Environmental Resources Trust

- Chino Basin Dairy Farm Biodigester

Verification: Environmental Resources Trust

=== Energy efficiency ===
- IdleAire Truckstop Electrification Project

Verification: Environmental Resources Trust

- Carbon Credit Retirement

Carbonfund.org purchased carbon financial instruments from the now closed Chicago Climate Exchange and retired them.

== Impact ==
Carbonfund.org Foundation offered offsets at $10.00 per metric ton. As of December 2019, the foundation was offsetting over 25 million metric tons of carbon dioxide emissions.

In 2019 total revenue was $5,373,825 of which $1,578,599 was spent on carbon projects. Among the included carbon projects was the reduction of over 128,000 carbon offsets, with a total cost of $346,319. The organization's president, Eric Carlson, was paid $551,585.

== Major partnerships ==
According to its website, Carbonfund.org Foundation worked with over 2,000 small, medium, and large businesses since its inception, including Dell, Allstate, Orbitz, JetBlue, Budget Car Rental, LG, United States Environmental Protection Agency, Amtrak and Discovery Communications.

== Camp Quinebarge ==
Carbonfund.org previously owned a traditional, co-ed, overnight summer camp—with an emphasis on nature/environmental education— in Carroll County, New Hampshire. Located on Lake Kanasatka, Camp Quinebarge was founded in 1936, and was purchased by Carbonfund.org in 2012. In April 2021, the camp was sold to its executive director.
