= Lakes Region (New Hampshire) =

New Hampshire Lakes Region
- Region
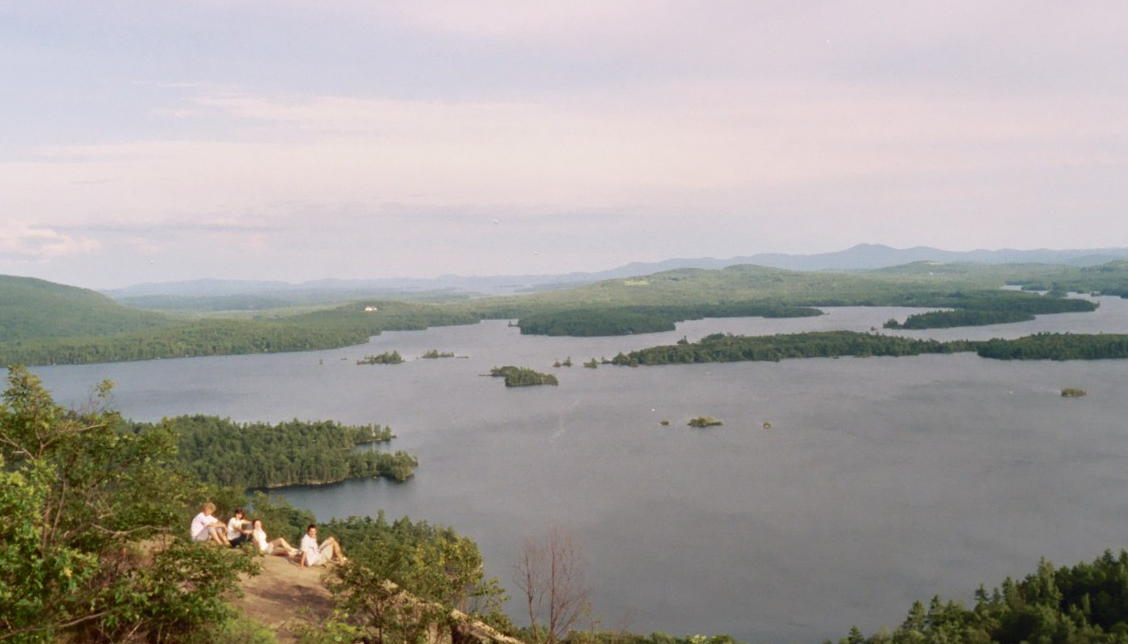
- Squam Lake from West Rattlesnake: a typical vista in the Lakes Region

- Map of the Lakes Region
- Country: United States
- State: New Hampshire
- Counties: Belknap County; Carroll County; Grafton County; Strafford County; Merrimack County
- Time zone: EST
- Area codes: 603

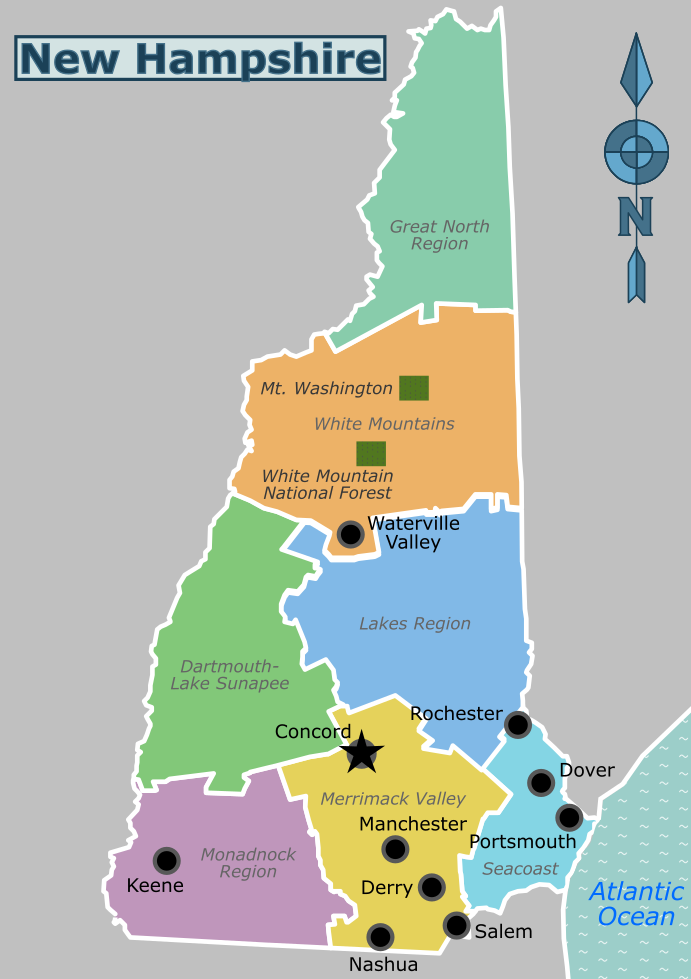
In this 2018 map by the N.H. Department of Transportation, the Lakes Region (in darker blue) is located in the east-central portion of the state.

The Lakes Region of New Hampshire is located in the east-central part of the state, south of the White Mountains Region and extending to the Maine border. It is named for the numerous lakes in the region, the largest of which are Lake Winnipesaukee, Lake Winnisquam, Squam Lake, and Newfound Lake. The area comprises all of Belknap County, the southern portion of Carroll County, the eastern portion of Grafton County, and the northern portions of Strafford County and Merrimack County. The largest municipality is the city of Laconia.

Besides the lakes, there are also two small mountain ranges, the Belknap Mountains which lie to the southwest, and the Ossipee Mountains to the northeast.

The area is a popular tourist destination in the summer time, with the activity peaking during the annual Motorcycle Week and races at Loudon's New Hampshire Motor Speedway. Other tourist destinations include Funspot in Weirs Beach, the Squam Lakes Natural Science Center in Holderness, the children's museum of Center Harbor, Gunstock ski resort and Bank of New Hampshire Pavilion at Meadowbrook, both in Gilford, Castle in the Clouds in Moultonborough, and the town of Wolfeboro, which claims to be the nation's oldest resort town. Lake Winnipesaukee is the largest lake in the state, and is home to numerous vacation homes. Several motion pictures have either been filmed or set in the region, including the 1981 classic, On Golden Pond (filmed on Squam Lake in the town of Holderness) and the 1991 comedy What About Bob?, which was filmed in Virginia but (fictitiously) took place in Wolfeboro.

== Lakes ==
Below is a partial list of the largest lakes found in the Lakes Region:

- Balch Pond
- Broad Bay
- Crystal Lake
- Dan Hole Pond
- Great East Lake
- Halfmoon Lake
- Lake Kanasatka
- Little Squam Lake
- Locke Lake
- Lovell Lake
- Merrymeeting Lake
- Mirror Lake
- Newfound Lake
- Opechee Bay
- Ossipee Lake
- Paugus Bay
- Pemigewasset Lake
- Pine River Pond
- Province Lake
- Silver Lake
- Squam Lake
- Sunset Lake
- Lake Waukewan
- Lake Wentworth
- White Oak Pond
- Wicwas Lake
- Lake Winnipesaukee
- Lake Winnisquam
