= Old Webster Meeting House =

Historic church in New Hampshire, United States

- U.S. National Register of Historic Places
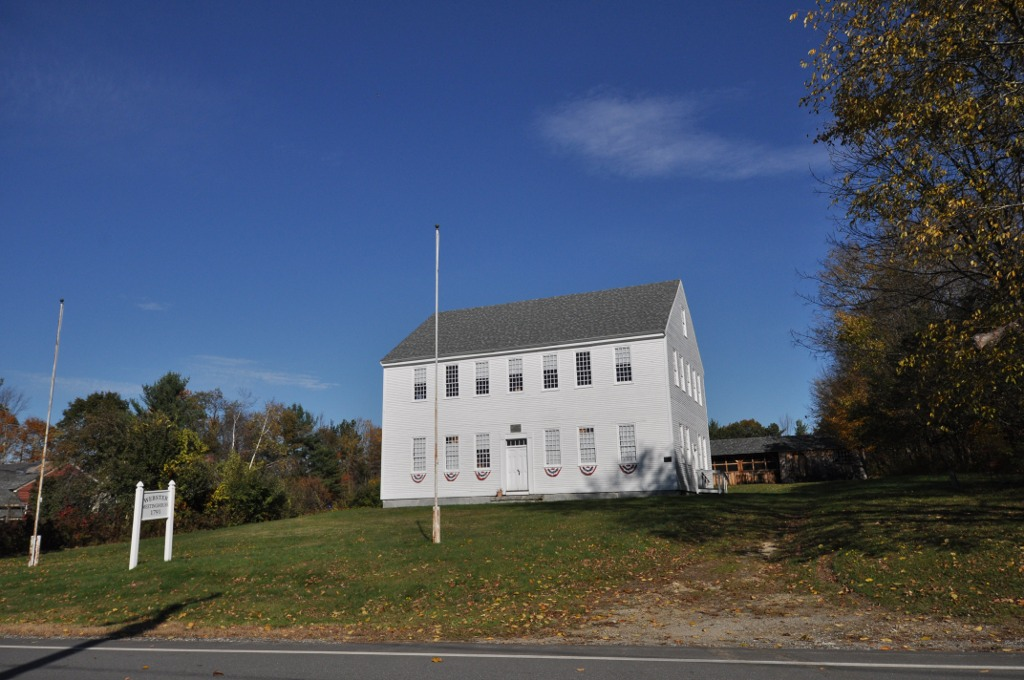

- Location within New Hampshire Location within the United States
- Location: Off NH 127 on Battle St., Webster, New Hampshire
- Coordinates: 43°19′47″N 71°43′3″W
- Area: 0.5 acres (0.20 ha)
- Built: 1791
- Built by: Samuel Jackman
- NRHP reference No.: 85000479
- Added to NRHP: March 7, 1985

The Old Webster Meeting House is a historic meeting house at 1220 Battle Street in Webster, New Hampshire. Built in 1791, and altered in the 1840s, the meeting house is one of a small number of 18th-century meeting houses to survive in northern New England. The building was moved from its original site in 1942 to make way for a flood control project and was given modern footings for the granite foundation in 1979. The building, owned by the Society for the Preservation of the Old Meeting House, now serves as a local museum. It was listed on the National Register of Historic Places in 1985.

== Description and history ==
The Old Webster Meeting House is located in the village center of Webster, on the east side of Battle Street (New Hampshire Route 127) a short way north of its junction with Long Street. It is a 2½-story wood-frame structure, with a side gable roof and clapboarded exterior. The main facade is seven bays wide, with 16-over-12 sash windows in most of the bays. The entrance is in the center bay, framed by simple Greek Revival trim and topped by a transom window. The interior has an entry vestibule, from which stairs rise on either side to the second floor. The lower level was historically used for town meetings and functions, while the upper level was used for religious activities. A row of horse sheds, 100 feet (30 m) in length, is located behind the building.

The area that is now Webster was first incorporated as part of Boscawen. Its residents petitioned for separation from Boscawen on the grounds that it was too far to the town's original meeting house; the town's response was to build this "westerly" meeting house in 1791, modeled closely on the original 1769 meeting house. Its early use and maintenance were shared by the town and the local Congregationalists, a situation that lasted until 1823. In that year, a second church group objected to the Congregationalists' use of the building, resulting in the latter group's construction of the nearby Webster Congregational Church. This building was thereafter occupied by the town and the Christian Union Society, who in 1844 decided to formally partition the building. This resulted in a number of alterations: what had been a gallery space on the second level was converted into a full second floor, and exterior projecting staircase enclosures were removed in favor of internal stairs. The main entrance's Greek Revival decoration also dates to this time.

In 1941 the building was slated for demolition as part of a flood control project. A local group was formed to preserve the building, and it was moved to its present location in 1942. It now serves as a local history museum.

== See also ==
- National Register of Historic Places listings in Merrimack County, New Hampshire
