= Pillsbury Lake (New Hampshire) =

Lake in Webster, New Hampshire

- Pillsbury Pond, Holmes Mill Pond
- Satellite imagery of Pillsbury Lake, courtesy of the USGS

- Location within New Hampshire
- Location: Webster, New Hampshire
- Coordinates: 43°17′3″N 71°40′44″W
- Type: Lake
- Etymology: General Moody Adams Pillsbury
- Part of: Merrimack River watershed
- Primary inflows: Deer Meadow Brook
- Primary outflows: Deer Meadow Brook
- Catchment area: 5,554 acres (2,248 ha)
- Basin countries: United States
- Surface area: 45 acres (18 ha)
- Average depth: 1.4 m (4 ft 7 in)
- Max. depth: 3 m (9.8 ft)
- Water volume: 263,500 m^{3} (9,310,000 cu ft)
- Shore length^{1}: 5.42 km (3.37 mi)
- Surface elevation: 415 ft (126 m)
- Islands: 1
- Settlements: Pillsbury Lake Village District
- ^{1} Shore length is not a well-defined measure.

Pillsbury Lake is a 45-acre (18 ha) lake in Webster, New Hampshire, United States. It is home to the Pillsbury Lake Village District. It is located near the Boscawen town border, and is accessible mainly by Deer Meadow Road.

== History ==
Pillsbury Lake was named after General Moody Adams Pillsbury ( 1794—1863), one of Boscawen's early settlers from Newbury, Massachusetts. He had a sawmill at the lake, then called Pillsbury Pond. When the Holmes mill was built, the lake's name was changed to Holmes Mill Pond. A century after Moody's passing in 1863, the Holmes house was torn down to make way for a series of summer houses. The lake was renamed Pillsbury Lake.

== Geography ==
Pillsbury Lake is located within the southeastern corner of Webster, near the Boscawen and Concord town and city lines. The lake is reached via Deer Meadow Road, while Concord Drive, New Hampshire Drive, Centennial Drive, Franklin Pierce Drive, Webster Lane, and Granite Way are residential roads around the lakeshore. The lake is 415 feet (126 m) above sea level and is part of the Merrimack River watershed. Water from Pillsbury Lake drains into Deer Meadow Brook, which flows southward into the Contoocook River, a tributary of the Merrimack River, which flows eventually into the Gulf of Maine.

== Hydrology ==
Pillsbury Lake has a surface area of 45 acres (18 ha), an average depth of 1.4 meters, and a maximum depth of 3-10 meters., and a volume of 263,500 m^{3} It has one small presque-isle (a peninsula that is almost an island) on Granite Way.

== Ecology and accessibility ==
Pillsbury Lake is home to various algae types and supports fish species such as largemouth bass, yellow perch, bluegill, and chain pickerel. The lake is bordered by residential areas accessed by Deer Meadow Road, Granite Way, Webster Lane, Centennial Drive, Franklin Pierce Drive, New Hampshire Drive, and Concord Drive. The New Hampshire Fish and Game Department maintains a boating access ramp at the south end of the lake.

== See also ==
- List of lakes of New Hampshire
- Contoocook River
- Webster, New Hampshire
