= Webster Congregational Church =

Historic church in New Hampshire, United States

- U.S. National Register of Historic Places
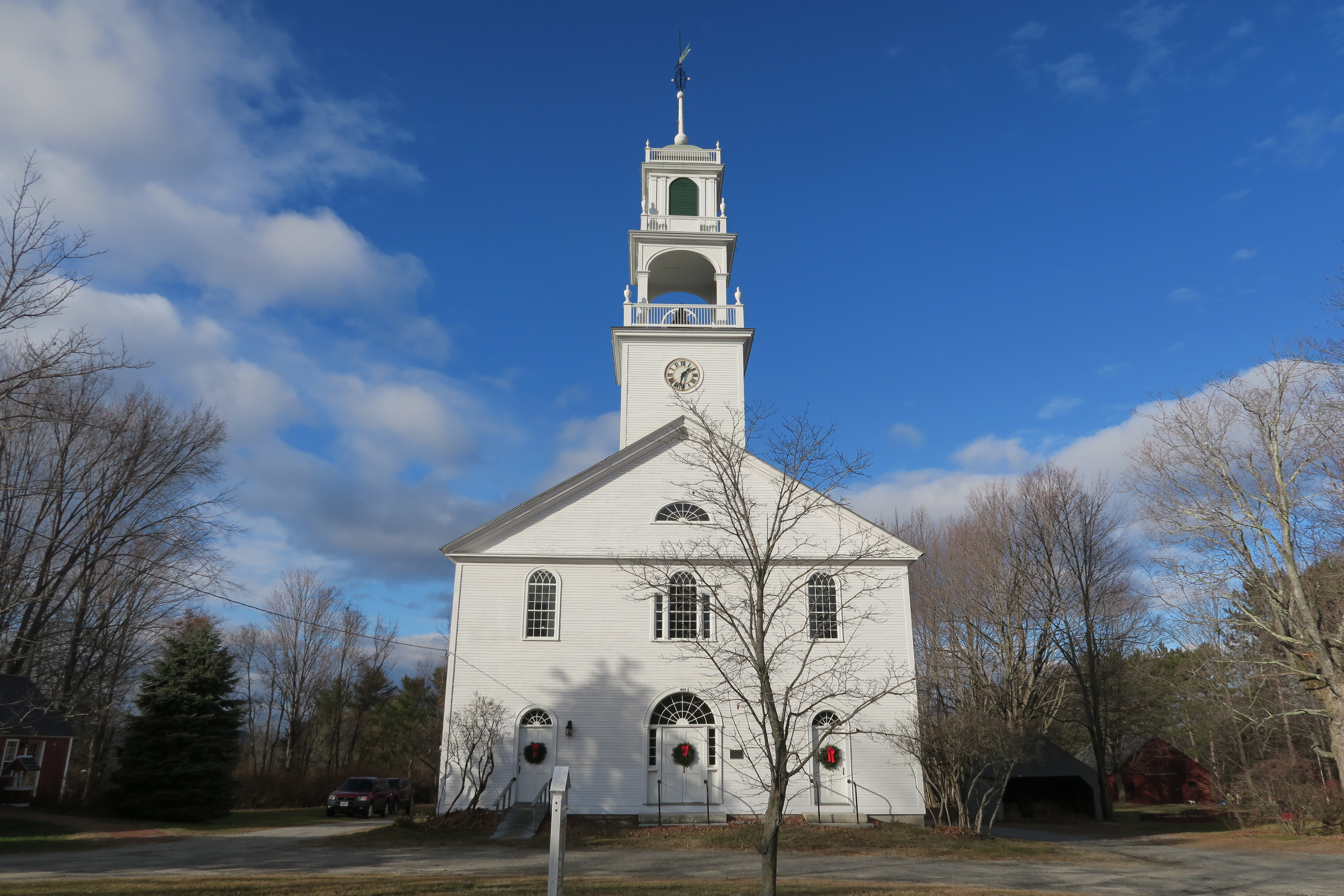
- Webster Congregational Church

- Location within New Hampshire Location within the United States
- Location: Off NH 127 on Long St., Webster, New Hampshire
- Coordinates: 43°19′48″N 71°43′0″W
- Area: 0.7 acres (0.28 ha)
- Built: 1823
- Architect: Pillsbury, George T.
- Architectural style: Federal
- NRHP reference No.: 85000480
- Added to NRHP: March 07, 1985

The Webster Congregational Church is a historic Congregational church off NH 127 on Long Street in Webster, New Hampshire, United States. The church was built in 1823 by George Pillsbury, a local builder, with interior joinery by William Abbot, another experienced church builder, and is an excellent representation of late Federal styling. The main facade has three entrances, each topped by a semicircular fanlight with reeded soffit. The central doorway has sidelight windows, while the flanking doors do not. On the second level there is a Palladian window above the central door, and smaller round-arch windows nearly above the flanking doors. The gable end of the roof is fully pedimented, with a semi-elliptical window in the tympanum.

The tower begins with a square section that has a clock in the front face, and continues with an open belfry supported by columns topped by elliptical arches. Above the belfry is a smaller square lantern stage with louvered openings and corner pilasters. This is topped by a four-sided dome and finial. Each stage of the tower has a decorative balcony railing, shrinking in size, with matching corner posts topped by finials.

The interior of the building consists of a large auditorium with gallery, and an entry vestibule with stairs on either side. The gallery is supported by turned posts that rise to an elaborate entablature that forms the base of the gallery's parapet. The interior is lit by a chandelier installed in 1884 and electrified in 1930.

The church was listed on the National Register of Historic Places in 1985.

== See also ==
- National Register of Historic Places listings in Merrimack County, New Hampshire
