= Sunset Lake (Lakes Region, New Hampshire) =

Body of water in New Hampshire, US

- Places Pond
- Location within New Hampshire Location within the United States
- Location: Belknap County, New Hampshire
- Coordinates: 43°28′20″N 71°18′16″W
- Primary outflows: tributary of Suncook River
- Basin countries: United States
- Max. length: 1.3 mi (2.1 km)
- Max. width: 0.5 mi (0.80 km)
- Surface area: 253 acres (1.02 km^{2})
- Average depth: 18 ft (5.5 m)
- Max. depth: 78 ft (24 m)
- Surface elevation: 806 ft (246 m)
- Islands: 3
- Settlements: Gilmanton; Alton

Sunset Lake is a 253-acre (1.02 km^{2}) water body located in Belknap County in the Lakes Region of New Hampshire, United States, in the towns of Gilmanton and Alton. Water from Sunset Lake flows south to Crystal Lake, the head of the Suncook River, which flows to the Merrimack River and ultimately the Gulf of Maine.

The lake is classified as a warmwater fishery, with observed species including smallmouth and largemouth bass, rainbow smelt, chain pickerel, brown bullhead, sunfish, and yellow perch.

== See also ==
- List of lakes in New Hampshire
