= Knowles Pond (Merrimack County) =

Reservoir in Northfield, New Hampshire

- Interactive map of Knowles Pond
- Location: Northfield, New Hampshire
- Type: Pond
- Etymology: Knowles family
- Part of: Merrimack River watershed
- Primary inflows: Williams Brook
- Primary outflows: Williams Brook
- Basin countries: United States
- Managing agency: Town of Northfield
- Surface area: 55 acres (22 ha)
- Max. depth: 50 ft (15 m)
- Surface elevation: 750 ft (230 m)
- Islands: 1

Knowles Pond is a 55-acre (22 ha) lake in Northfield, New Hampshire, United States. It is located within the Knowles Pond Conservation Area.

== History ==
Knowles Pond was originally called "Chestnut Pond", as seen in a map in The History of Northfield, New Hampshire 1780-1905 by Lucy Rogers Hill Cross. It was a water-supply reservoir for the Tilton-Northfield Aqueduct Company, providing drinking water for the towns of Northfield and Tilton. Soon, the company began to use wells on along Tilton Road (present-day New Hampshire Route 140), and eventually, they fully switched to these wells.

In 1999, Knowles Pond was sold to the town, with the Knowles family offering a donation of $375,000, half the purchase price. In 1999, at a special town meeting, voters agreed to spend the donation on the lake's protection. The Knowles Pond Conservation Area soon came into fruition, and no gas-powered vehicles are allowed on the lake.

== Geography ==
Knowles Pond is located in the northeastern part of Northfield, New Hampshire, on Knowles Pond Road. The lake lies within central New Hampshire's Lakes Region, near the Tilton town line. The Knowles Pond Dam, a small earthen dam that created the lake, impounds Williams Brook. The pond sits at approximately 755 feet (230 m) above sea level. The lake is part of the Merrimack River watershed, gaining water from Williams Brook, a tributary of the Winnipesaukee River, which flows into the Merrimack River in Franklin.

== Hydrology ==
Knowles Pond is a deep lake, with a maximum depth of 50 feet (15.24 m) and a surface area of 55 acres (22 ha). It is an artificial water body, created by the Knowles Pond Dam on Williams Brook. The lake is part of the Knowles Pond Conservation Area.

== Ecology ==
Knowles Pond is home to many aquatic plants and algae, and to fish such as yellow perch, smallmouth bass, and largemouth bass. Loons commonly nest at Knowles Pond, and it is preserved to help protect not only the lake itself but the species that reside within it.

== Recreation ==
Knowles Pond has many well-marked hiking and recreational trails, a kiosk on Rand Road, a boat launch and a ledge for swimming. Lake access is permitted from dawn to dusk, and is part of the large Knowles Pond Conservation Area.

== See also ==
- List of lakes of New Hampshire
