= White Oak Pond =

Lake in New Hampshire, United States

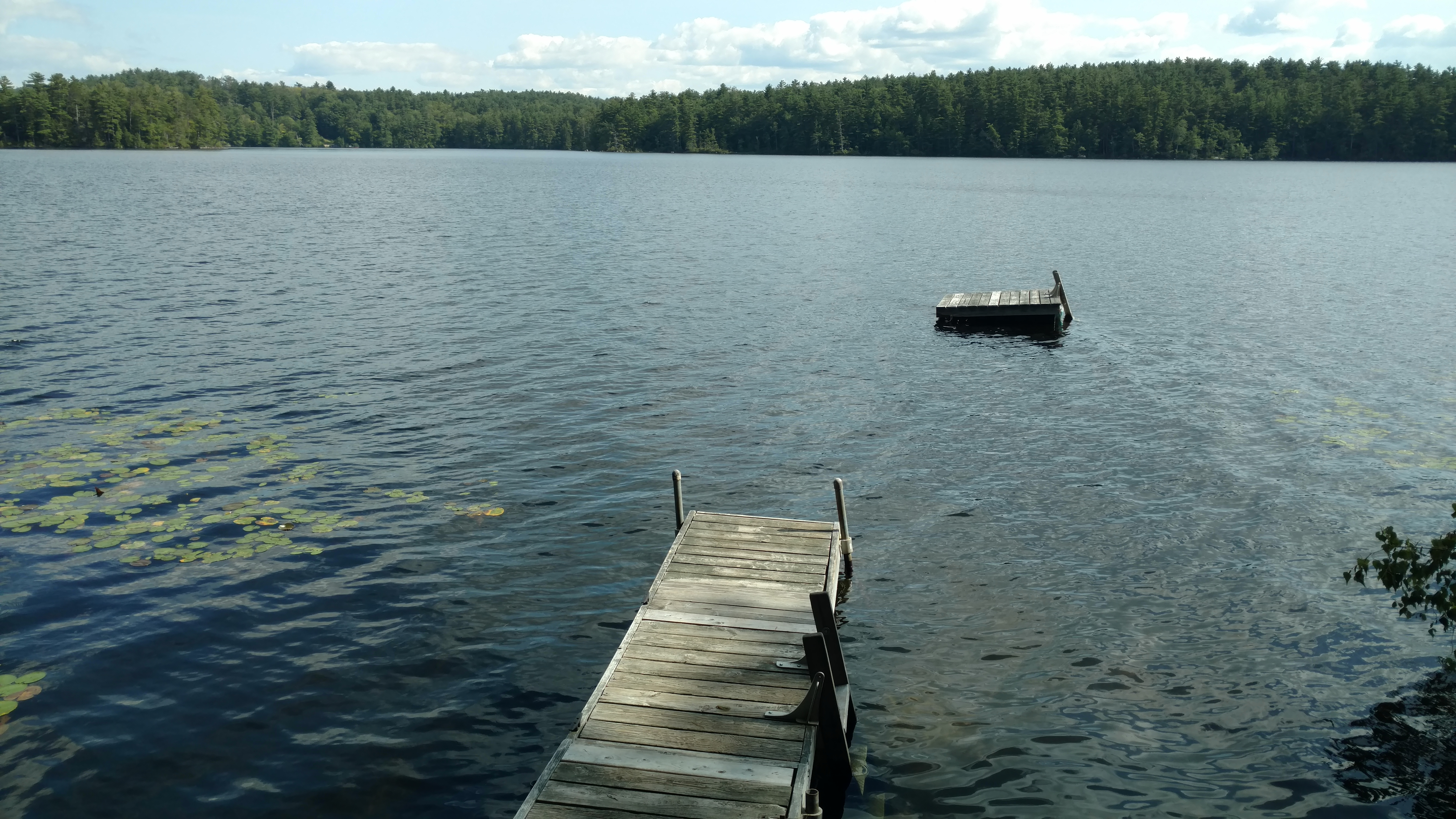

- Location within New Hampshire Location within the United States
- Location: Grafton County, New Hampshire
- Coordinates: 43°43′1″N 71°33′33″W
- Primary outflows: tributary of Squam Lake
- Basin countries: United States
- Max. length: 1.0 mi (1.6 km)
- Max. width: 1.2 mi (1.9 km)
- Surface area: 295 acres (1.19 km^{2})
- Average depth: 13 ft (4.0 m)
- Max. depth: 35 ft (11 m)
- Surface elevation: 586 ft (179 m)
- Islands: 2
- Settlements: Holderness

White Oak Pond is a 295-acre (1.19 km^{2}) water body in Grafton County in the Lakes Region of central New Hampshire, United States, in the town of Holderness. Water from White Oak Pond flows north to Squam Lake and is part of the Pemigewasset River watershed.

In September 2024 the pond had an outbreak of cyanobacteria days after filing for a state watershed management grant of $100,000.

== See also ==
- List of lakes in New Hampshire
