= Akers Pond =

Lake in Coos County, New Hampshire

- Location within New Hampshire Location within the United States
- Location: Coos County, New Hampshire
- Coordinates: 44°47′55″N 71°09′37″W
- Primary inflows: Greenough Brook
- Primary outflows: Clear Stream
- Basin countries: United States
- Max. length: 1.3 mi (2.1 km)
- Max. width: 0.6 mi (0.97 km)
- Surface area: 276 acres (1.12 km^{2})
- Average depth: 18 ft (5.5 m)
- Max. depth: 26 ft (7.9 m)
- Surface elevation: 1,228 ft (374 m)
- Settlements: Errol

Akers Pond is a 276-acre (1.1 km^{2}) water body located in Coos County in northern New Hampshire, United States, in the town of Errol. Water from Akers Pond flows via Clear Stream to the Androscoggin River and thence into Maine.

The lake is classified as a coldwater fishery, with observed species including rainbow trout and largemouth bass.

== See also ==
- List of lakes in New Hampshire
