= Pemigewasset Lake =

Lake in Belknap County, New Hampshire, USA

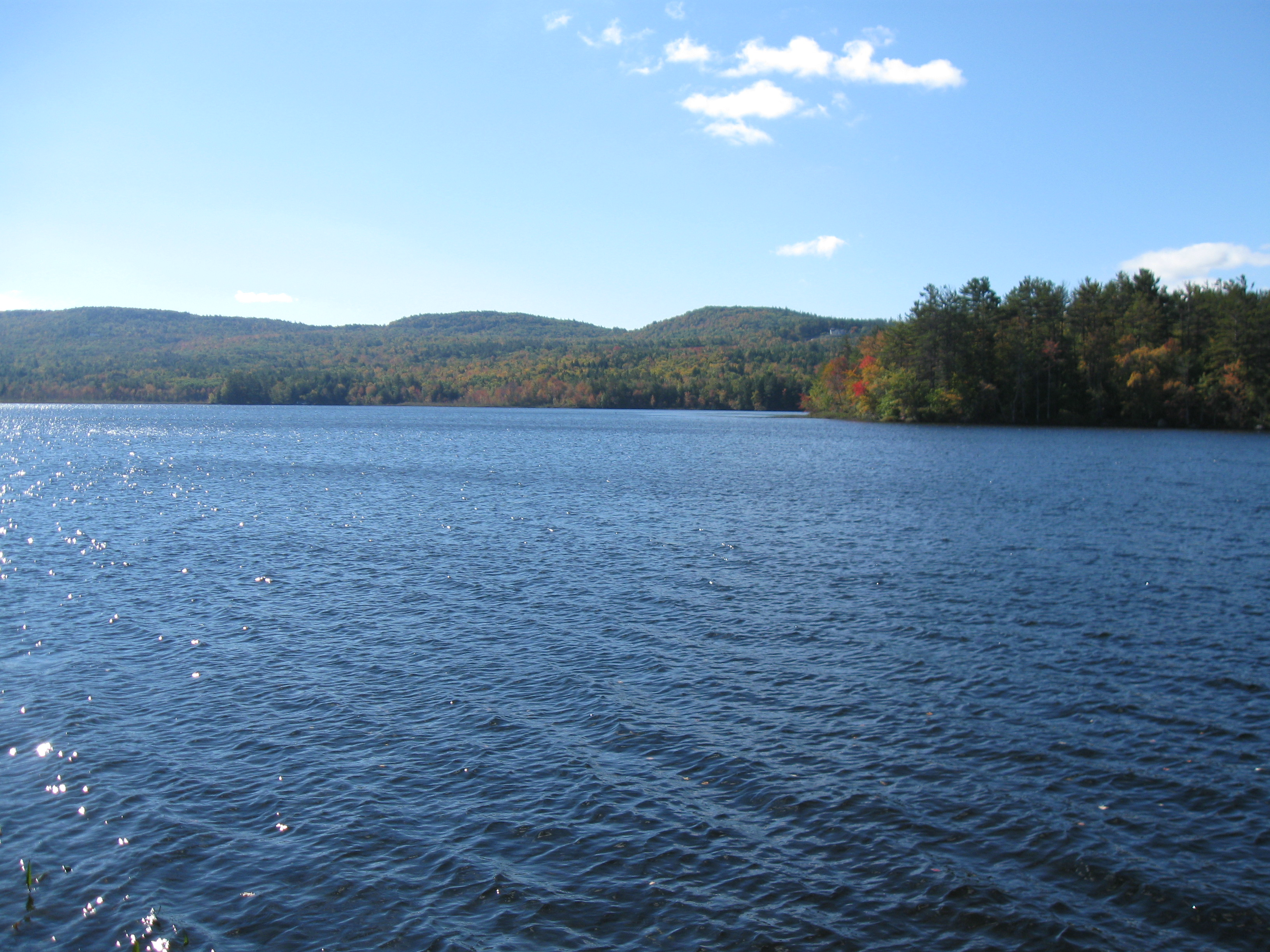

- Location within New Hampshire Location within the United States
- Location: Belknap County, New Hampshire
- Coordinates: 43°36′53″N 71°35′41″W
- Primary inflows: Merrill Brook
- Primary outflows: tributary of Harper Brook
- Basin countries: United States
- Max. length: 1.7 mi (2.7 km)
- Max. width: 0.7 mi (1.1 km)
- Surface area: 249 acres (101 ha)
- Average depth: 8 feet (2 m)
- Max. depth: 29 feet (9 m)
- Surface elevation: 558 ft (170 m)
- Islands: 1
- Settlements: New Hampton, Meredith

Pemigewasset Lake is a 249-acre (101 ha) water body located in the Lakes Region of central New Hampshire in the United States. The lake straddles the border between the towns of New Hampton and Meredith, both in Belknap County. Outflow from the lake travels down Harper Brook to the Pemigewasset River, a tributary of the Merrimack River, which flows to the Gulf of Maine.

The lake is classified as a warmwater fishery, with observed species including smallmouth and largemouth bass, chain pickerel, horned pout, and black crappie.

== Development ==
Summer camps, private residences, and a campground line the northern side of the lake, while the southern shoreline is less developed. NH Route 104 runs past the north shore of the lake. A private area called "Smoke Rise" lies on the western side of the lake. Smoke Rise Road and a smaller secondary road, Easy Street, are located in this area. Smoke Rise borders the southwest side of Pemi Shores Condominiums, a group of 16 summer cottages on the shore of the lake.

== Island ==
The western portion of the lake contains a large uninhabited island. The island is edged with edible blueberries and boasts some rather large, old trees inland. It is named Kelley Island on state Fish and Game Department maps but is often referred to as Blueberry Island.

Although evidence of previous fire pits can be found on the island, burning is strictly prohibited by the New Hampton fire department.

== See also ==
- List of lakes in New Hampshire
