= Greenough Pond =

Lake in Coos County, New Hampshire

- Location within New Hampshire Location within the United States
- Location: Coos County, New Hampshire
- Coordinates: 44°49′57″N 71°8′26″W
- Primary inflows: Greenough Brook
- Primary outflows: Greenough Brook
- Basin countries: United States
- Max. length: 1.1 mi (1.8 km)
- Max. width: 0.5 mi (0.80 km)
- Surface area: 234 acres (0.9 km^{2})
- Average depth: 38 ft (12 m)
- Max. depth: 103 ft (31 m)
- Surface elevation: 1,435 ft (437 m)
- Settlements: Wentworth Location

Greenough Pond is a 234-acre (0.9 km^{2}) water body located in Coos County in northern New Hampshire, United States, in the township of Wentworth Location. The pond is part of the Androscoggin River watershed.

The lake is classified as a coldwater fishery, with observed species including brook trout and lake trout.

== See also ==
- List of lakes in New Hampshire
