= Amos Pollard =

Chief surgeon at the Battle of the Alamo

- Born: October 29, 1803; Ashburnham, Massachusetts
- Died: March 6, 1836 (aged 32); The Alamo, San Antonio, Texas
- Military career
- Allegiance: Republic of Texas
- Branch: (Republic of Texas) Texas Army
- Service years: 1835–1836
- Rank: Private
- Conflicts: Texas Revolution: Battle of Gonzales; Siege of Bexar; Battle of the Alamo †

Amos Pollard (October 29, 1803 – March 6, 1836) was the chief surgeon at the Battle of the Alamo and died during the battle on March 6, 1836.

== Biography ==
Pollard was born on October 29, 1803, in Ashburnham, Massachusetts, to Jonas and Martha (Martin) Pollard. He grew up in Surry, New Hampshire, and in 1825 he graduated from the medical school of the Vermont Academy in Castleton, Vermont. After residing for a period in Blauvelt, New York, Pollard then removed to Manhattan where he spent the years 1825 to 1834 practicing medicine at various locations. He married Fanny Parker in 1828, and they had one daughter before his wife's death in 1831. In 1834 Pollard traveled to Texas by way of New Orleans. He moved to Gonzales, Texas, and on October 2, 1835, he took part in the fight for the "Come and Take It" cannon in Gonzales, which was the opening battle of the Texas Revolution. "Pollard later went to San Antonio de Béxar as a private in Capt. John York's volunteer company. On October 23, 1835, he was appointed surgeon of the regiment by Stephen F. Austin."

"After the siege of Bexar, Pollard remained in the town as chief surgeon of the Texan garrison, on the staff of Lt. Col. James C. Neill. He cared for the sick and wounded of the garrison and also set up a hospital within the Alamo. On February 23, 1836, Antonio López de Santa Anna's Mexican army besieged the Alamo. Pollard died in the Battle of the Alamo on March 6, 1836, probably defending the Alamo hospital. A portrait of him was done sometime before he moved to Texas. Besides William Travis, Jim Bowie, and Davy Crockett, he is the only Alamo defender of whom a portrait was done from life. A copy of the portrait is on display in the Alamo."

== Sources ==
- Samuel Erson Asbury Papers, Dolph Briscoe Center for American History, University of Texas at Austin. Daughters of the American Revolution, The Alamo Heroes and Their Revolutionary Ancestors (San Antonio, 1976). Daughters of the Republic of Texas, Muster Rolls of the Texas Revolution (Austin, 1986). Bill Groneman, Alamo Defenders (Austin: Eakin, 1990). John H. Jenkins, ed., The Papers of the Texas Revolution, 1835–1836 (10 vols., Austin: Presidial Press, 1973). Walter Lord, A Time to Stand (New York: Harper, 1961; 2d ed., Lincoln: University of Nebraska Press, 1978). Phil Rosenthal and Bill Groneman, Roll Call at the Alamo (Fort Collins, Colorado: Old Army, 1985).

== See also ==
- List of Alamo defenders
