= Sandogardy Pond =

Natural pond in Northfield, New Hampshire

- Sondogardy Pond, Skendugoddy Pond
- Satellite view of Sandogardy Pond, courtesy of the USGS
- Interactive map of Sandogardy Pond
- Location: Northfield, New Hampshire
- Type: Pond
- Etymology: Unknown; possible Abenaki word
- Primary inflows: Cross Brook
- Primary outflows: Cross Brook
- Basin countries: United States
- Managing agency: Town of Northfield
- Surface area: 37 acres (15 ha)
- Max. depth: 14 ft (4.3 m)
- Surface elevation: 413 ft (126 m)
- Islands: 0
- Settlements: Northfield Station

Sandogardy Pond (also spelled Sondogardy Pond or Skendugoddy Pond) is a natural pond in Northfield, New Hampshire, United States. It is part of Glines Park, located in the town's southwest corner on Sandogardy Pond Road, near the Canterbury and Boscawen town lines.

== Geography ==
Sandogardy Pond is located on Sandogardy Pond Road, Eastside Road, and Glines Park Road in the southwestern part of Northfield, New Hampshire. The south end of the pond is located along Glines Park, one of the many conservation areas in town. The pond sits at an elevation of 413 feet (126 m) and is part of the Merrimack River watershed.

== Hydrology ==
The pond is part of the Merrimack River watershed, being fed and drained by Cross Brook, which meets with the Merrimack River on the Franklin city line. The pond's surface area is roughly 37 acres (15 ha). The pond is relatively shallow, with a maximum depth of 14 feet (4.3 m). The pond has at times been declared unsafe for swimming due to algae blooms and bacteria.

== Ecology ==
Sandogardy Pond is home to many types of aquatic plants, including various algae that have impaired the pond. The various types of fish that the pond supports include largemouth bass, yellow perch, and bluegill.

== 1938 New England hurricane ==
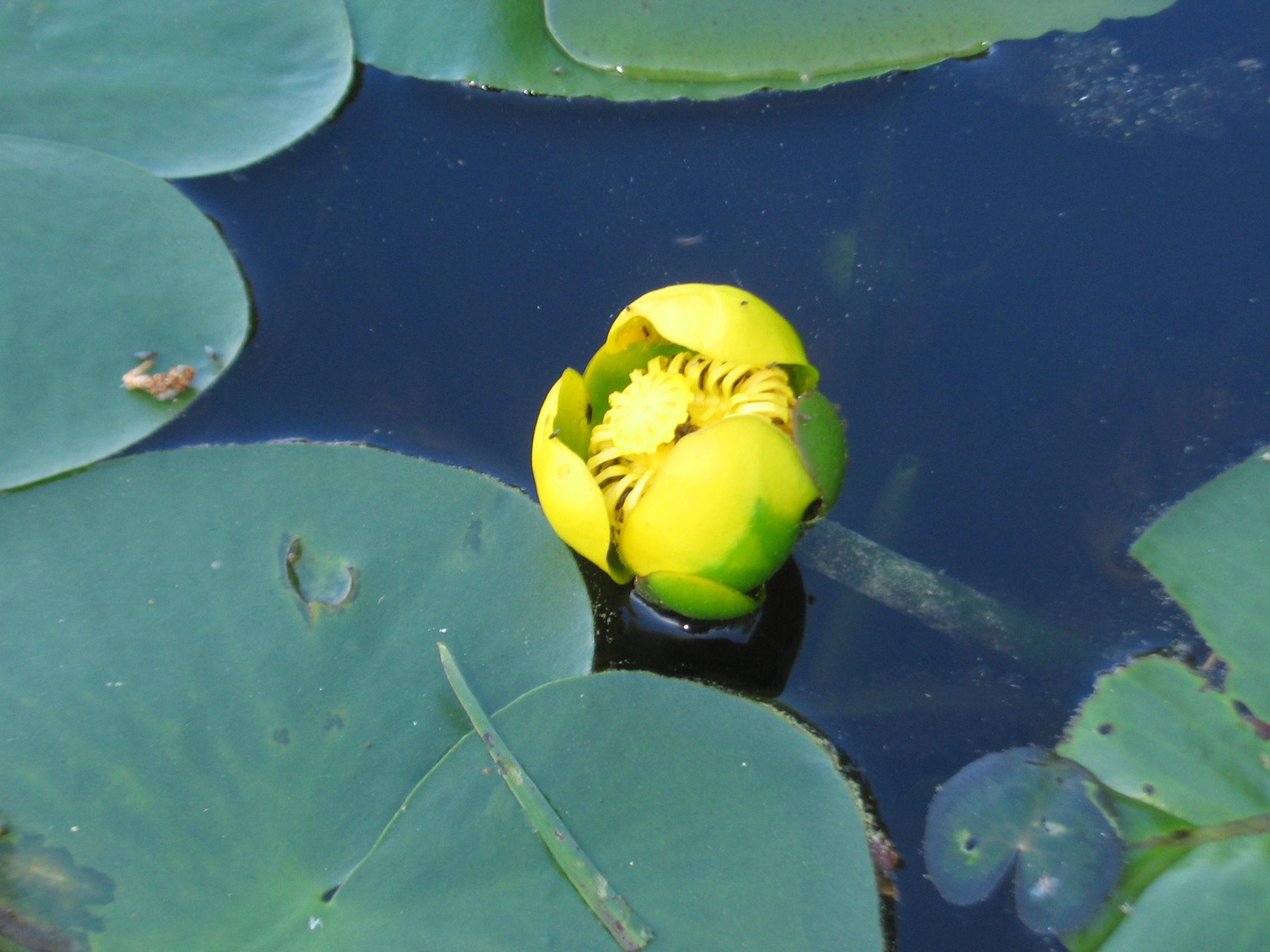
An aquatic flower in Sandogardy Pond

The 1938 New England hurricane struck New England by surprise, causing many deaths, ending villages like Napatree Point in Rhode Island, and in New Hampshire it sent logs hurtling into Sandogardy Pond. Many logs are still there at the pond bed, and sometimes the logs will bob up to the shore, making boating unsafe. Beavers also utilized these logs to make dams.

== Beaver dams and flooding ==
In 2024, beavers in and around the Sandogardy Pond area began building dams on Cross Brook, blocking the brook and causing Sandogardy Pond to overflow. Lakeside homes were flooded, and septic systems on the pond shore were flooded and contaminated. Not only were septic systems flooded, but the pond also was breached. Residents began to wade into the pond and remove beaver dams, and the town also took action.

== Recreation ==
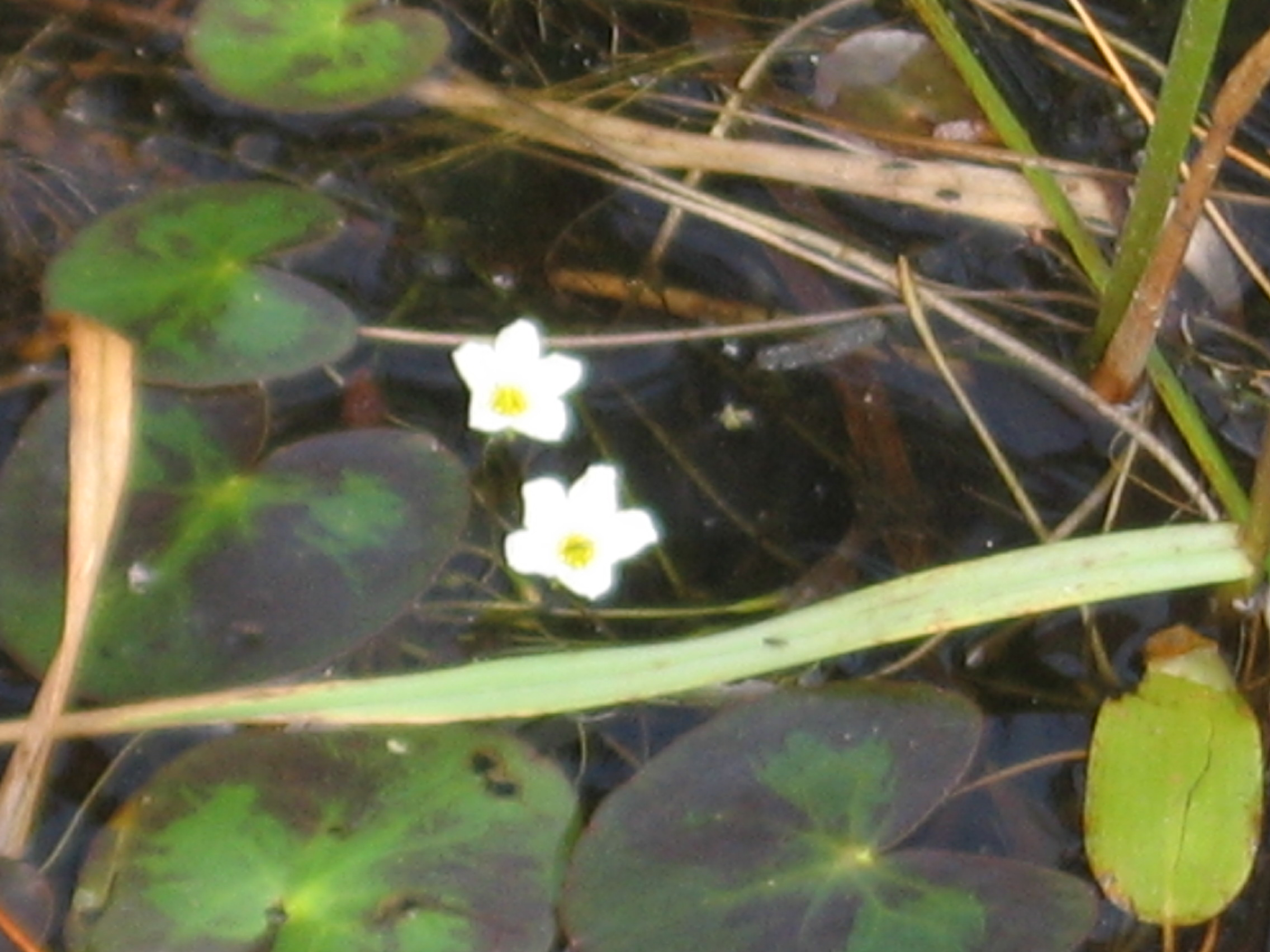
More aquatic flowers on the water of Sandogardy Pond

Sandogardy Pond is home to Glines Park, a conservation area with a boat launch, public beach, and playground. The pond has little regulation, and gas-powered boats are allowed on the lake. The pond, unlike Knowles Pond, does not have strict conservation rules to protect it, and, as a result, the pond has been declared unsafe for swimming.

== See also ==
- List of lakes of New Hampshire
- Merrimack River
