= Surry Mountain Lake =

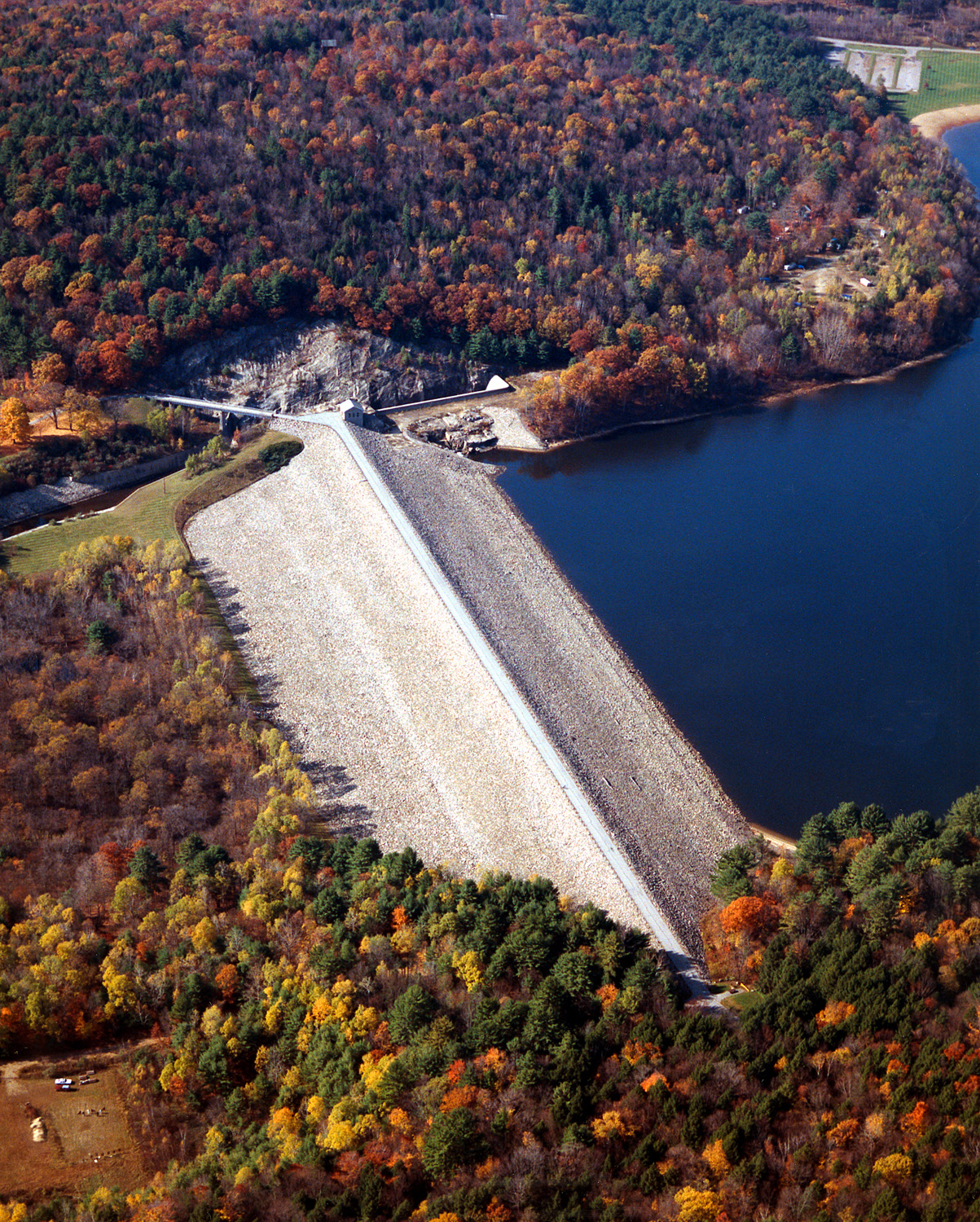
- Surry Mountain Dam and Lake on the Ashuelot River

- Location within New Hampshire Location within the United States
- Location: Surry, Cheshire County, New Hampshire
- Coordinates: 42°59′54″N 72°18′35″W
- Type: Reservoir
- Primary inflows: Ashuelot River
- Primary outflows: Ashuelot River
- Basin countries: United States
- Max. length: 1.0 mi (1.6 km)
- Max. width: 0.6 mi (0.97 km)
- Surface area: 353 acres (1.43 km^{2})
- Average depth: 5 ft (1.5 m)
- Max. depth: 14 ft (4.3 m)
- Surface elevation: 502 feet (153 m)
- Settlements: Surry

Surry Mountain Lake is a 353-acre (1.43 km^{2}) impoundment on the Ashuelot River in Cheshire County in southwestern New Hampshire, United States, in the town of Surry.

The reservoir was built to protect downstream communities, such as Keene, from flooding. Surry Mountain Dam was built by the United States Army Corps of Engineers in 1941 as an earthen rock-fill structure. Its height is 83 feet (25 m), its length is 1,800 feet (550 m) at the crest, with a maximum capacity of 44,000 acre-feet and a normal capacity of 1,320 acre-feet. Both dam and reservoir are owned by the Corps of Engineers.

The lake is classified as a warmwater fishery, with observed species including rainbow trout, brown trout, smallmouth and largemouth bass, chain pickerel, horned pout, and black crappie.

== See also ==
- List of lakes in New Hampshire
