= Lake Winnepocket =

- Winnepocket Pond
- Satellite imagery of Lake Winnepocket, courtesy of the USGS
- Location: Webster, New Hampshire
- Type: Lake
- Primary inflows: Schoodac Brook
- Basin countries: United States
- Surface area: 229 acres (93 ha)
- Max. depth: 63 ft (19 m)
- Surface elevation: 453 ft (138 m)
- Islands: 0
- Settlements: Swetts Mills

Lake Winnepocket is a 229-acre (93 ha) freshwater lake in Webster, New Hampshire, near the village of Swetts Mills. It is separated from Walker Pond by the Blackwater River, a Contoocook River tributary. It is on the north side of Round Hill.

== Geography ==
Lake Winnepocket is located near the Blackwater River in the western part of Webster, New Hampshire. It has an elevation of 453 feet (138 m) above sea level. It is located west of Walker Pond and north of Round Hill.

== Hydrology ==
Lake Winnepocket is mainly spring-fed, which makes its waters exceptionally clean and clear. The outlet of the lake is at its northwestern end, where it drains into Schoodac Brook. It has a maximum depth of 63 feet (19 m), and a surface area of 229 acres (93 ha). It sits at an elevation of 454 feet (138 m). It is part of the Merrimack River watershed: its outlet stream, Schoodac Brook, flows south to the Warner River, which runs southeast to the Contoocook River, a Merrimack River tributary.

== Ecology and accessibility ==
Lake Winnepocket is home to many species of fish, such as chain pickerel, largemouth bass, and smallmouth bass. It is also home to many loons, and is considered a very clean water body. It is a popular spot for fishing. White Plains Road runs past the northern end of the lake, with residential roads (Westwind Village Road, Lake Road, Rolfe Road, and Nichols Road) following the shoreline off White Plains Road.

== See also ==
- List of lakes of New Hampshire
