= Penacook Lake =

Lake in New Hampshire, United States

- Long Pond
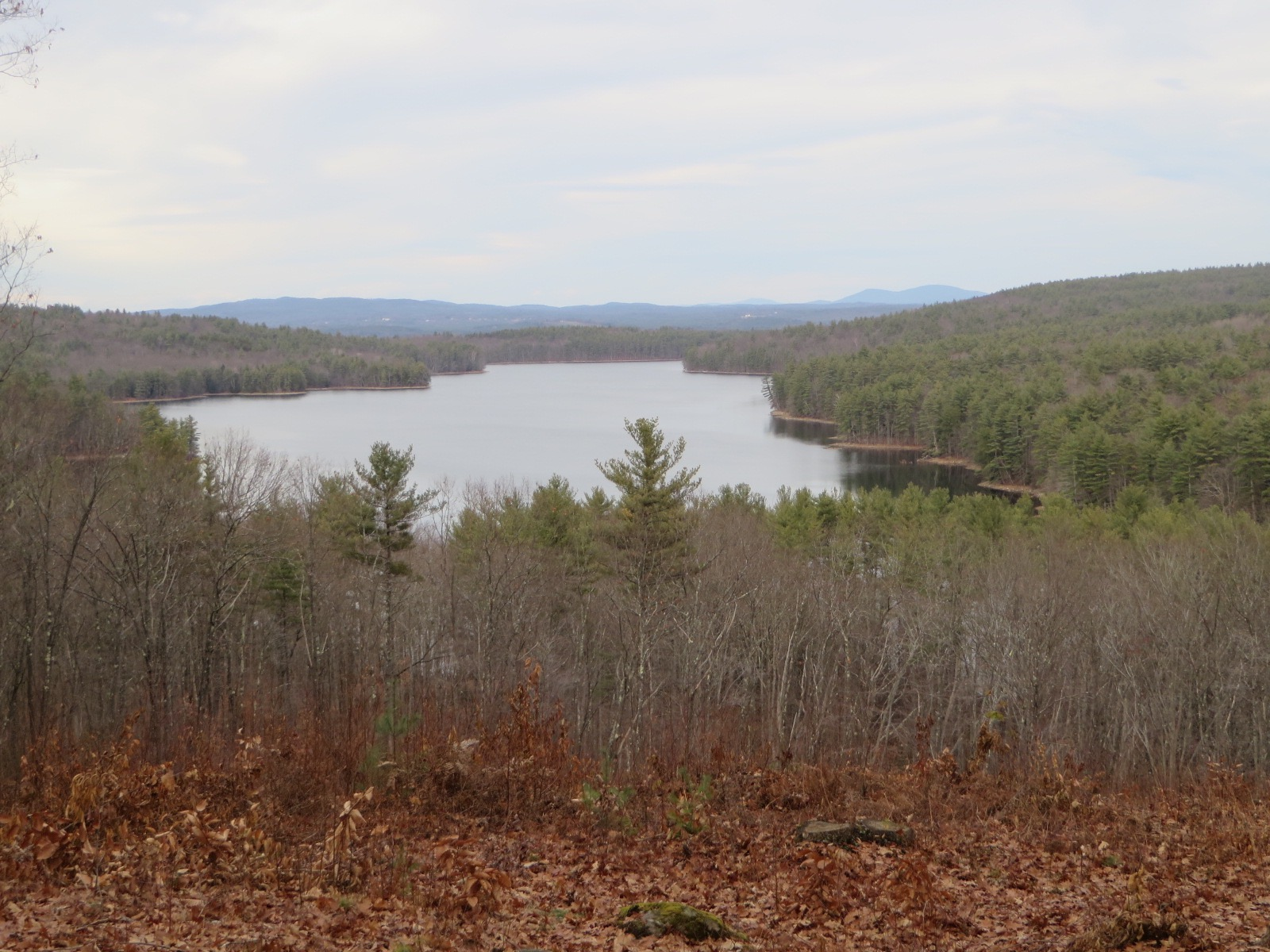
- Penacook Lake from the south

- Location within New Hampshire Location within the United States
- Location: Merrimack County, New Hampshire
- Coordinates: 43°13′52″N 71°35′29″W
- Primary outflows: Tributary of Merrimack River
- Basin countries: United States
- Max. length: 2.3 miles (3.7 km)
- Max. width: 0.6 miles (1.0 km)
- Surface area: 362 acres (1.5 km^{2})
- Surface elevation: 402 feet (123 m)
- Settlements: Concord

Penacook Lake is a 362-acre (1.5 km^{2}) lake located in Merrimack County in central New Hampshire, United States, in the city of Concord. It has also been known as "Long Pond". It is the largest lake in Concord and serves as the city's water supply. Water that is not captured by the city's water treatment plant flows two-thirds of a mile to the Merrimack River.

== See also ==
- List of lakes in New Hampshire
