= Surry, New Hampshire =

- Town
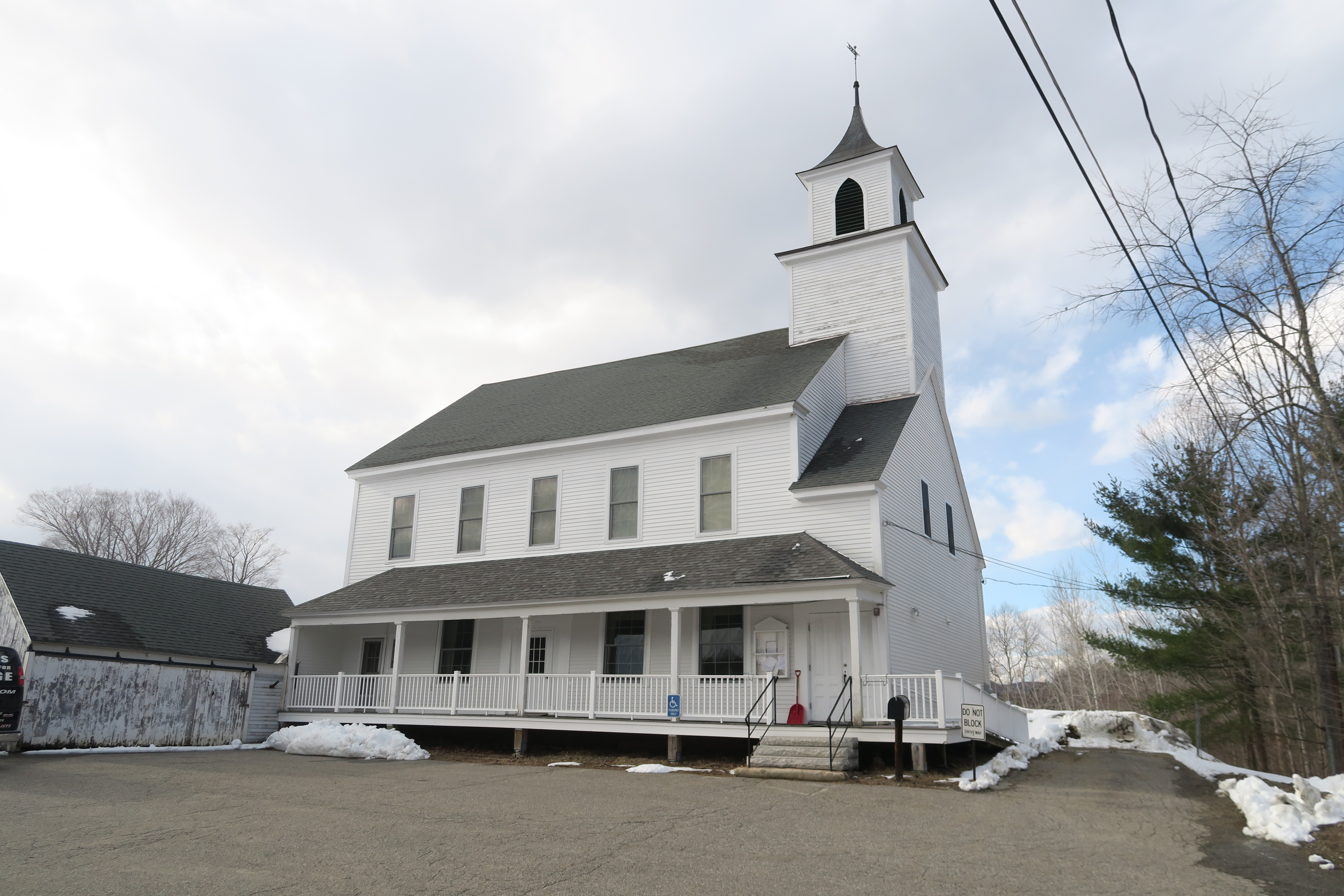
- Town Hall

- Seal

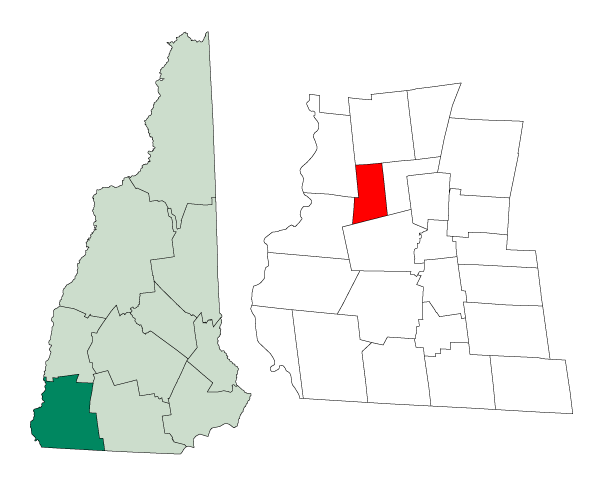
- Location in Cheshire County, New Hampshire
- Coordinates: 43°01′15″N 72°19′49″W
- Country: United States
- State: New Hampshire
- County: Cheshire
- Incorporated: 1769
- Communities: Surry; Shaws Corner

Area
  - Total: 16.0 sq mi (41.4 km^{2})
  - Land: 15.7 sq mi (40.6 km^{2})
  - Water: 0.31 sq mi (0.8 km^{2}) 1.97%
- Elevation: 594 ft (181 m)

Population (2020)
  - Total: 820
  - Density: 52/sq mi (20.2/km^{2})
- Time zone: UTC−5 (Eastern)
  - Summer (DST): UTC−4 (Eastern)
- ZIP Code: 03431
- Area code: 603
- FIPS code: 33-75300
- GNIS feature ID: 873733
- Website: www.surry.nh.gov

Surry is a town in Cheshire County, New Hampshire, United States. The population was 820 at the 2020 census, up from 732 at the 2010 census, and was an estimated 862 in 2025.

== History ==
Surry was chartered in 1769, and named for Charles Howard, 10th Duke of Norfolk, and Earl of Surrey. The first census taken in Surry, in 1790, reported 448 residents.

== Geography ==
According to the United States Census Bureau, the town has a total area of 16.0 square miles (41.4 km^{2}), of which 15.7 square miles (40.6 km^{2}) are land and 0.31 square miles (0.8 km^{2}) is water, comprising 1.97% of the town. The highest point in Surry is along the town's western border, on the upper slopes of Derry Hill, where the elevation reaches 1,555 feet (474 m).

Surry Dam on the Ashuelot River is in the south central part of town. It holds back Surry Mountain Lake, which functions as a recreational site.

A waterfall locally known as 40 Foot Falls can be seen from Joslin Road on Merriam Brook.

=== Adjacent municipalities ===
- Alstead (north)
- Gilsum (east)
- Keene (south)
- Westmoreland (southwest)
- Walpole (northwest)

== Demographics ==
Historical population
Census	Pop.	Note	%±
1790	448		—
1800	569		27.0%
1810	564		−0.9%
1820	570		1.1%
1830	539		−5.4%
1840	481		−10.8%
1850	556		15.6%
1860	389		−30.0%
1870	318		−18.3%
1880	326		2.5%
1890	270		−17.2%
1900	250		−7.4%
1910	213		−14.8%
1920	200		−6.1%
1930	198		−1.0%
1940	236		19.2%
1950	291		23.3%
1960	362		24.4%
1970	507		40.1%
1980	656		29.4%
1990	667		1.7%
2000	673		0.9%
2010	732		8.8%
2020	820		12.0%
2024 (est.)	861		5.0%
U.S. Decennial Census

At the 2000 census there were 673 people, 268 households, and 206 families living in the town. The population density was 43.2 inhabitants per square mile (16.7/km^{2}). There were 282 housing units at an average density of 18.1 per square mile (7.0/km^{2}). The racial makeup of the town was 98.07% White, 0.59% Native American, 0.30% Asian, 0.15% from other races, and 0.89% from two or more races. Hispanic or Latino of any race were 1.49%.

Of the 268 households 30.6% had children under the age of 18 living with them, 69.8% were married couples living together, 6.0% had a female householder with no husband present, and 22.8% were non-families. Of all households 18.7% were one person and 7.8% were one person aged 65 or older. The average household size was 2.51 and the average family size was 2.84.

The age distribution was 21.4% under the age of 18, 4.6% from 18 to 24, 26.4% from 25 to 44, 31.6% from 45 to 64, and 15.9% 65 or older. The median age was 44 years. For every 100 females, there were 96.8 males. For every 100 females age 18 and over, there were 98.9 males.

The median household income was $56,964 and the median family income was $60,179. Males had a median income of $34,464 versus $22,250 for females. The per capita income for the town was $24,277. About 0.5% of families and 1.8% of the population were below the poverty line, including 1.3% of those under age 18 and 4.9% of those age 65 or over.

== Notable person ==
- Amos Pollard (1803–1836), chief surgeon and defender of the Alamo; grew up in Surry
