= Sebbins Pond =

Lake in Hillsborough County, New Hampshire, United States

- Looking towards Camp Kettleford in the fall

- Location within New Hampshire Location within the United States
- Location: Hillsborough County, New Hampshire
- Coordinates: 42°55′41″N 71°28′44″W
- Primary outflows: Sebbins Brook
- Basin countries: United States
- Max. length: 0.3 mi (0.48 km)
- Max. width: 0.2 mi (0.32 km)
- Surface area: 20 acres (8.1 ha)
- Max. depth: 40 ft (12 m)
- Surface elevation: 195 ft (59 m)
- Settlements: Bedford

Sebbins Pond is an approximately 20-acre (81,000 m^{2}) body of water in Bedford, New Hampshire. It is located in the eastern part of the town, between Back River Road and the Everett Turnpike. It is named for a man with the last name of Sebbins, who in 1735 set up shop at a site near the pond to make shingles, which he then dragged down to the nearby Merrimack River to ship – two years before the first permanent settlement in Bedford in 1737.

Sebbins Pond is the largest body of water totally within the town boundaries. It is bounded on the southwest side by Camp Kettleford, which is owned and operated by the Swift Water Council of the Girl Scouts of the USA, which uses the pond for canoeing and swimming. The rest of Sebbins Pond is bounded by approximately 20 private homes, many of which are former summer cabins or houses that have been winterized and expanded. There is no public access to the pond.

The pond is fed by several springs and by a small stream draining from nearby Silver Springs Pond ("Muddy Pond" on some maps). Its outlet is Sebbins Brook, which leads southeast, combines with the outfall from Sandy Pond, and continues to the Merrimack River.

Like all water bodies greater than 10 acres (4.0 ha) in New Hampshire, Sebbins is a great pond, public property held in trust by the state.
