= Broad Bay (New Hampshire) =

Freshwater lake in New Hampshire, US

- Location within New Hampshire Location within the United States
- Location: Carroll County, New Hampshire
- Coordinates: 43°48′21″N 71°06′05″W
- Primary inflows: Ossipee Lake
- Primary outflows: Ossipee River
- Basin countries: United States
- Max. length: 2.1 mi (3.4 km)
- Max. width: 0.6 mi (0.97 km)
- Surface area: 464 acres (1.88 km^{2})
- Average depth: 27 ft (8.2 m)
- Max. depth: 73 ft (22 m)
- Surface elevation: 407 ft (124 m)
- Islands: 1
- Settlements: Freedom; Ossipee

Broad Bay is a 431-acre (1.74 km^{2}) freshwater lake located in Carroll County in eastern New Hampshire, United States, in the towns of Freedom and Ossipee. Broad Bay is part of a chain of four lakes with identical water levels, due to a dam located downstream in Effingham Falls. Upstream, a channel connects Broad Bay to Ossipee Lake, while a channel leads downstream through Leavitt Bay and Berry Bay to the start of the Ossipee River, which flows east into Maine and the Saco River.

Broad Bay is classified as a cold- and warmwater fishery, with observed species including largemouth bass, smallmouth bass, rainbow trout, lake trout, landlocked salmon, chain pickerel, yellow perch, white perch, sunfish, and brown bullhead.

== See also ==
- List of lakes in New Hampshire
