= Lake Ivanhoe (New Hampshire) =

Lake in New Hampshire, United States

- Round Pond
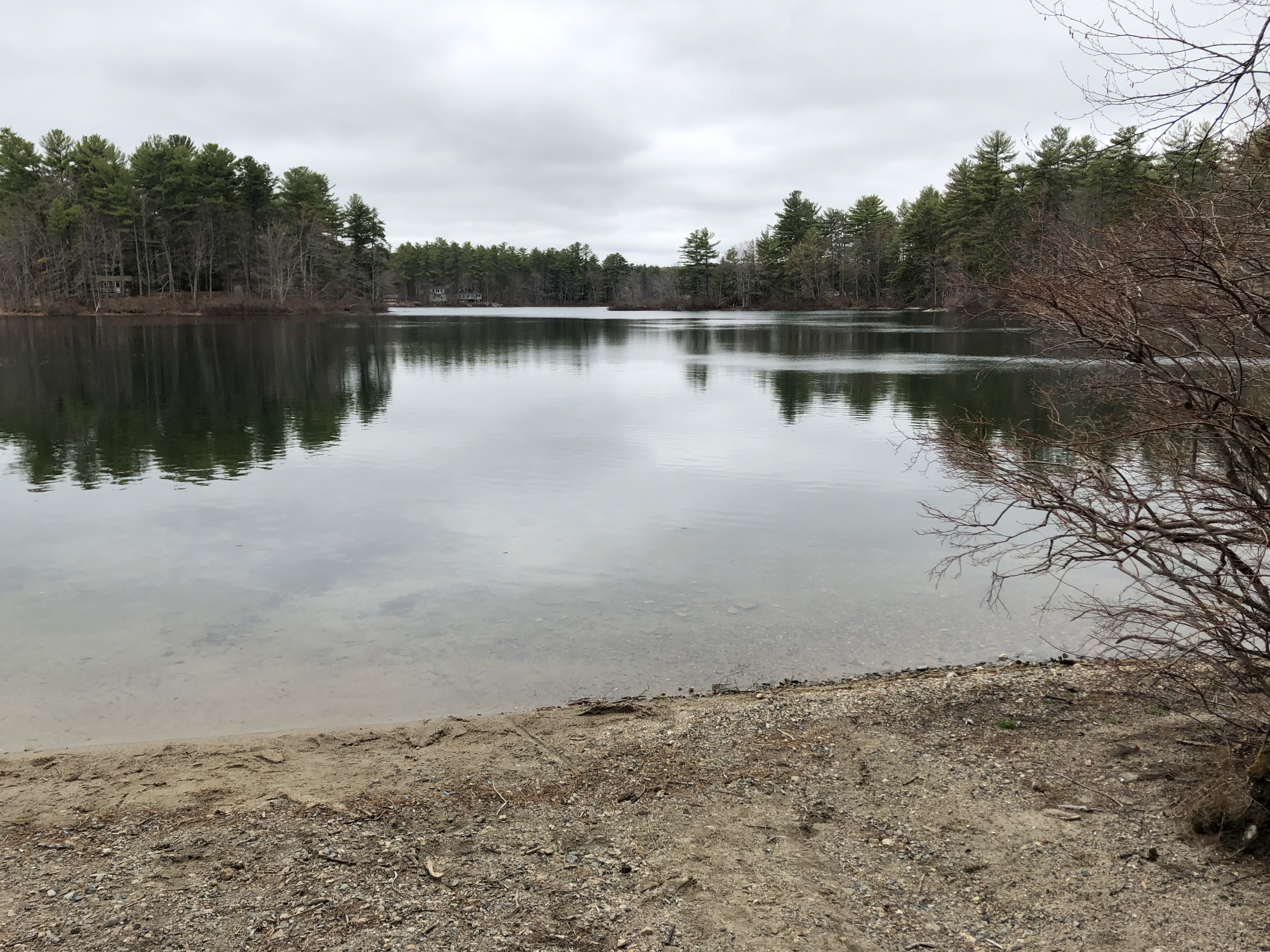

- Location within New Hampshire Location within the United States
- Location: Carroll County, New Hampshire
- Coordinates: 43°36′7″N 70°59′25″W
- Type: Oligotrophic
- Primary outflows: Groundwater to Great East Lake
- Catchment area: 455 acres (184 ha)
- Basin countries: United States
- Max. length: 3,371 feet (1,027 m)
- Max. width: 1,851 feet (564 m)
- Surface area: 68 acres (28 ha)
- Average depth: 12 feet (3.7 m); Average transparency: 4.7 metres (15 ft)
- Max. depth: 20 feet (6.1 m)
- Water volume: 992,000 cubic metres (35,000,000 cu ft)
- Residence time: 1.1 years
- Shore length^{1}: 8,858 feet (2,700 m)
- Surface elevation: 571 feet (174 m)
- Settlements: Wakefield
- ^{1} Shore length is not a well-defined measure.

Lake Ivanhoe (also known as Round Pond) is located in Carroll County, New Hampshire, in the United States. The lake has no traditional inlets or outlets. Historically, a small stream drained Lake Ivanhoe to Great East Lake, but construction filled in that stream many years ago and now drainage flows via groundwater to Great East Lake.

Lake Ivanhoe is classified as "Potentially Impaired" according to the New Hampshire Department of Environmental Services water quality parameters. Lake Ivanhoe receives this designation due to its in-lake phosphorus concentration which exceeds the water quality standards for oligotrophic lakes. The Lake Ivanhoe watershed is 455 acres (184 ha) and is 64% forested. The watershed is currently 17%, developed with 59% of the watershed being buildable area. The Lake Ivanhoe shoreline is primarily composed of low density residential houses and camps (66%). The majority of these structures (88%) are within 50 feet of the water's edge.

Lake Ivanhoe water quality monitoring has been collected since 1981. During this period, 16 years of secchi disk transparency data, 17 years of total phosphorus (TP) data, 16 years of chlorophyll-a (Chl-a) data, and 14 years of dissolved oxygen (DO) data have been collected. From this data, the median TP concentration is 8.0 parts per billion (ppb) and the mean transparency is 4.7 metres (15 ft).

== See also ==
- List of lakes in New Hampshire
