= St. Joseph Cemetery (Manchester, New Hampshire) =

Cemetery in New Hampshire, United States

Coordinates: 42°58′31″N 71°29′28″W

- Interactive map of St. Joseph Cemetery

Details
- Established: July 2, 1848
- Location: Manchester, New Hampshire
- Country: United States
- Size: 110 acres (45 ha)

Saint Joseph Cemetery is a Corporal Work of Mercy of the Catholic Bishop of Manchester, New Hampshire. It is administered in his name by the pastor and people of the Cathedral of St. Joseph, Manchester. Situated on 110 acres (45 ha) on two sites, the older in Manchester and the newer in Bedford, New Hampshire, it has served the Catholic families of Manchester for over 160 years.

== Early years ==
The first recorded burial in what is now Saint Joseph Cemetery was that of Bartholomeu Quinn, who died July 2, 1848. Father William McDonald, Manchester's first permanently assigned Catholic priest, acquired land on a hillside overlooking the city's West Side, more than two miles (3 km) from downtown when Mr. Quinn's death made the establishment of a Catholic cemetery a necessity.

For more than twenty years, Father McDonald administered the cemetery from his rectory office at Saint Anne's Church. The only known references in print, however, refer to it simply as “the Catholic cemetery in ‘Squog.” “‘Squog” is the nickname given to a broad expanse of land on the banks of the Piscataquog River near its confluence with the Merrimack River, all on Manchester's West Side.

By 1869, the Catholic population had grown too large for just one parish. Bishop James Augustine Healy of Portland, Maine, to whose diocese Manchester still belonged, sent Father John O’Brien to assist Father McDonald by establishing a new parish, this one dedicated to Saint Joseph. Father O’Brien was succeeded by Father Denis Mary Bradley, who would go on to become New Hampshire's first Catholic bishop. Under his pastorate, control of the cemetery was ceded to Saint Joseph parish. The cemetery has borne Saint Joseph's name ever since.

== American Civil War ==
The death register for the years 1848 to 1885 has had to be recreated from external sources, such as gravestone markings and newspaper obituaries. The original records, if they still exist, could be stored, unrecognized, in any number of church or civic archives. The Old Cemetery has dozens of low-rising government stones bearing the inscription “GAR”, for “Grand Army of the Republic.” Many of these Civil War veterans were among the founders of the Sheridan Guards, a local veterans’ organization that in 1910 donated the outdoor altar on which Mass is offered each year on Memorial Day.

== Religious communities ==
Shortly after the first Catholic immigrants arrived, pioneering religious men and women followed to found the institutions that would educate, heal, and pray for the new immigrants in the city's first Catholic schools, hospitals and monasteries. To that end, three communities established their own burial grounds within Saint Joseph Cemetery: The Sisters of Mercy, the Sisters Adorers of the Precious Blood, and the Brothers of the Christian Schools.

The foundress of the Sisters of Mercy in the United States, Mother Frances Warde, is among those buried here. Her grave has become a place of pilgrimage both for the Sisters of Mercy and for those whom they have educated as the order marks its 150th year in America in 2008.

== Consecration ==
In 1884, Pope Leo XIII issued the decree separating the parishes in the state of New Hampshire from the Diocese of Portland, Maine, and naming Father Denis Mary Bradley, the pastor of Saint Joseph Church, as the first bishop of the new Diocese of Manchester. Saint Joseph Church became the cathedral. Attachment to the cathedral parish brought new prominence to Saint Joseph Cemetery. Many of Manchester's Catholics, now greater in number and better established economically, began to erect larger and more ornate memorials. The first above-ground family tombs date to this period.

The records specify that Bishop Bradley took a special interest in the development of the cemetery. He made personal inspections, dubbed “Episcopal Visitations”, in 1885 and 1888. In 1889, he had the first committal chapel erected on the grounds just inside the Main Gate on the north side of Donald Street. For the preceding forty-one years, the prayers for the dead were offered at graveside, rain or shine. Finally, on December 1, 1889, Saint Joseph Cemetery was formally consecrated according to the centuries-old rite of the Catholic Church. A description of the rites to be performed appeared in the Manchester Union on November 25, 1889:

On the day before a cemetery is blessed or consecrated, five crosses are erected in it, a large one in the center and a smaller one in each corner. In front of each of these five crosses a wooden stand or candle holder is placed, capable of holding three candles. These lifeless wooden stands, resembling the dryness of fleshless bones, represent man in his grave. They were set up yesterday, for yesterday is a figure of fleeting time; and in every corner of the cemetery, to remind us that the empire of death is spread all over the earth. The three candles, not yet lighted, represent the imperishable germ of life placed in our bodies by the three persons of the blessed Trinity. Soon at the direction of the bishop these candles will be lighted, and I give you the mysterious signification of the light. The cross in the center of the field is higher than the others, and represents our Lord Jesus Christ, who, having vanquished death, has become for us the resurrection and life. He, the first born among the dead, casting his protecting and saving shadow over his sleeping brethren. From their places in the four extremities of the field the four smaller crosses proclaim that the life-giving God of Calvary has flowed to the four quarters of the globe, to bring life on the day of resurrection to all men, no matter in what age or clime they may have died. It is therefore a beautiful custom, not to be omitted, to adorn the grave of every one dying in the Catholic faith, with the consoling sign of the redemption. Even the most costly and elaborate monument, if lacking this sign, can in no wise be compared with the ornament which a simple wooden cross affords to the resting place of the Christian.

== Expansion ==
New lots in the Old Cemetery have not been laid out or sold since 1954. Even before the First World War, it was clear that space was running out. To accommodate the growth of the Catholic population and in order to minister to its need for a place to bury its dead, Bishop George Albert Guertin acquired an additional 82 acres (330,000 m^{2}) in the town of Bedford, a half-mile west of the Old Cemetery. His timing was prophetic.

The Spanish Influenza, the flu epidemic that followed America's soldiers home from the trenches of France and Belgium, took so many lives that there was no time for most families to plan for and acquire lots. The dead were numbered and buried in rows in large common graves. The practice of funeral Masses for the dead was suspended to allow for swifter burial, and committals, called “Dispensations”, took place right at graveside. The first several sections of the New Cemetery filled quickly as a result.

== Modernization ==
In 1946, Monsignor Edward A. Clark, the longest-serving rector of the cathedral, entered into discussion with Ray F. Wyrick, at that time the country's only professional cemetery landscape engineer, concerning the tired appearance of the Old Cemetery and the need to expand the New. Wyrick suggested several sweeping changes which, once they were adopted, made Saint Joseph Cemetery a regional model.

The cemetery's roads had all been designed for access by horse and carriage. Wyrick was among the first to see the need for wider roads with expansive curves that could be successfully rounded by motor vehicles with a wider turning radius. His influence in this matter can be seen in sections 2, 3 4, and 8 and in the Memorial Garden bearing Monsignor Clark's name.

Wyrick also foresaw the need to end individual and annual care plans. A cemetery's success in maintaining its beauty depends on its ability to sell lots. Beauty is hard to maintain if fewer than 30% of all lots are under Perpetual Care contracts. Family lots of the 19th century were often left untended for months or years at a time. At his suggestion, Saint Joseph Cemetery made Perpetual Care a requirement in 1954. At this time, it also ended the practice of walling or fencing individual lots to allow for mechanized mowing.

== Influential figures ==
Throughout its history, Saint Joseph Cemetery has had surprisingly few directors and superintendents. For 70 of the 78 years since 1930, administration of the office and grounds changed hands only three times. The longest serving directors were Richard Hammond, George Francis and Elizabeth Merritt. Francis and Merritt were both influential leaders in the New England Cemetery Association and left their stamp on the advanced design, horticultural variety and carefully maintained condition of the cemetery.

They have had the help of special patrons as well, such as Helen Shaw, who in 1983 donated the funds necessary to erect a new and more comfortable committal chapel in the new cemetery to replace the one erected in 1889. Bishops Ernest Primeau and Leo O’Neil and a half dozen of their brother priests are buried on the grounds of this chapel, just to the south its main entry.

While the renovation of the cemetery was needed to accommodate the widespread use of motor vehicles, the changes were not without controversy. Gravestones, grave boundaries and remains were removed, changed, and altered. The granite markers were piled in a northeast corner of the property during paving. Some markers were re-installed, some continue to be used as landscaping stones. Others were destroyed. In fact, markers for the "Callahan" family plot can be seem lining the road near Boynton Street on Hazen Road. It is a continued source of ill will between parishioners and the church.

== Saint Joseph Cemetery today ==
In 2006, Father Joseph Cooper, pastor of the cathedral, appointed lifetime parishioner John Kelly to succeed Elizabeth Merritt as Director of the Cemetery. At the same time he appointed professional cemetery landscaper Keith Racine as Grounds Superintendent. In the two years since their appointment, they have overseen the renovation of the buildings and equipment and the expansion of the cemetery's services to allow for greater income and greater potential investment.
