= Lake Kanasatka =

Lake in New Hampshire, United States

- View from the outlet

- Location in New Hampshire Location in the United States
- Location: Carroll County, New Hampshire
- Coordinates: 43°43′30″N 71°27′3″W
- Primary outflows: to Lake Winnipesaukee
- Basin countries: United States
- Max. length: 2.0 miles (3.2 km)
- Max. width: 0.6 miles (0.97 km)
- Surface area: 358 acres (1.45 km^{2})
- Average depth: 18 feet (5.5 m)
- Max. depth: 40 feet (12 m)
- Surface elevation: 513 feet (156 m)
- Settlements: Moultonborough

Lake Kanasatka is a 358-acre (145 ha) lake located in Carroll County in the Lakes Region of central New Hampshire, United States, in the town of Moultonborough. The lake is located one-half mile (0.80 km) north of, and 9 feet (2.7 m) higher than, Lake Winnipesaukee. Lake Kanasatka lies at the base of Red Hill and is largely fed by its rain and snow runoff.

== History ==
Early maps refer to the lake, which is long and narrow, as "Long Pond", "Quinebarge Pond" or "Lake Quinebarge".

== Description ==
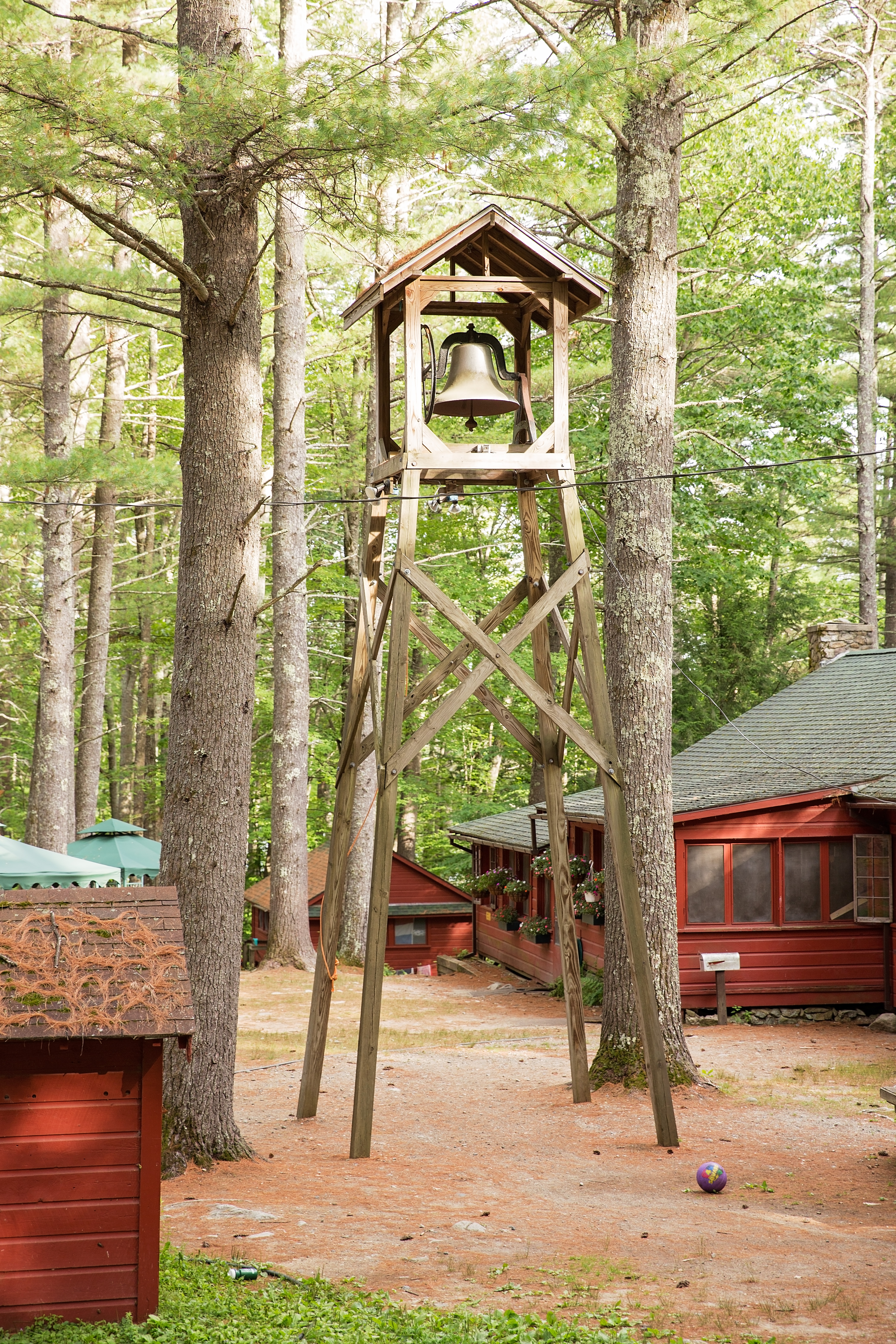
The Quinebarge bell

The lake is classified as a warm water fishery and contains largemouth and smallmouth bass, chain pickerel, white perch, yellow perch, sunfish, and brown bullhead. Lake Kanasatka is an oligotrophic lake, with high water clarity and scattered emergent plants.

The lake has about 180 homes, including the Kilnwood Homeowners Association development, comprising 29 homes with a shared waterfront.

=== Camp Quinebarge ===
The lake is the home for Camp Quinebarge, a traditional, co-ed overnight camp founded in 1936 by Tom and Ruth Kenly of Short Hills–Millburn, New Jersey. Quinebarge, which means "long still water", according to a camp brochure from 1963, draws campers from around the world. Notable alumni include Michael Leiter, former director of the National Counterterrorism Center (NCTC), and Frank Thomas "Tommy" Henshaw, a World War II soldier killed in action during the Battle of Okinawa in April 1945 and awarded the Silver Star for bravery. Camp Quinebarge lies on the northern shore of the lake.

== See also ==
- List of lakes in New Hampshire
