= Halfmoon Lake (Barnstead, New Hampshire) =

Lake in Belknap County, New Hampshire

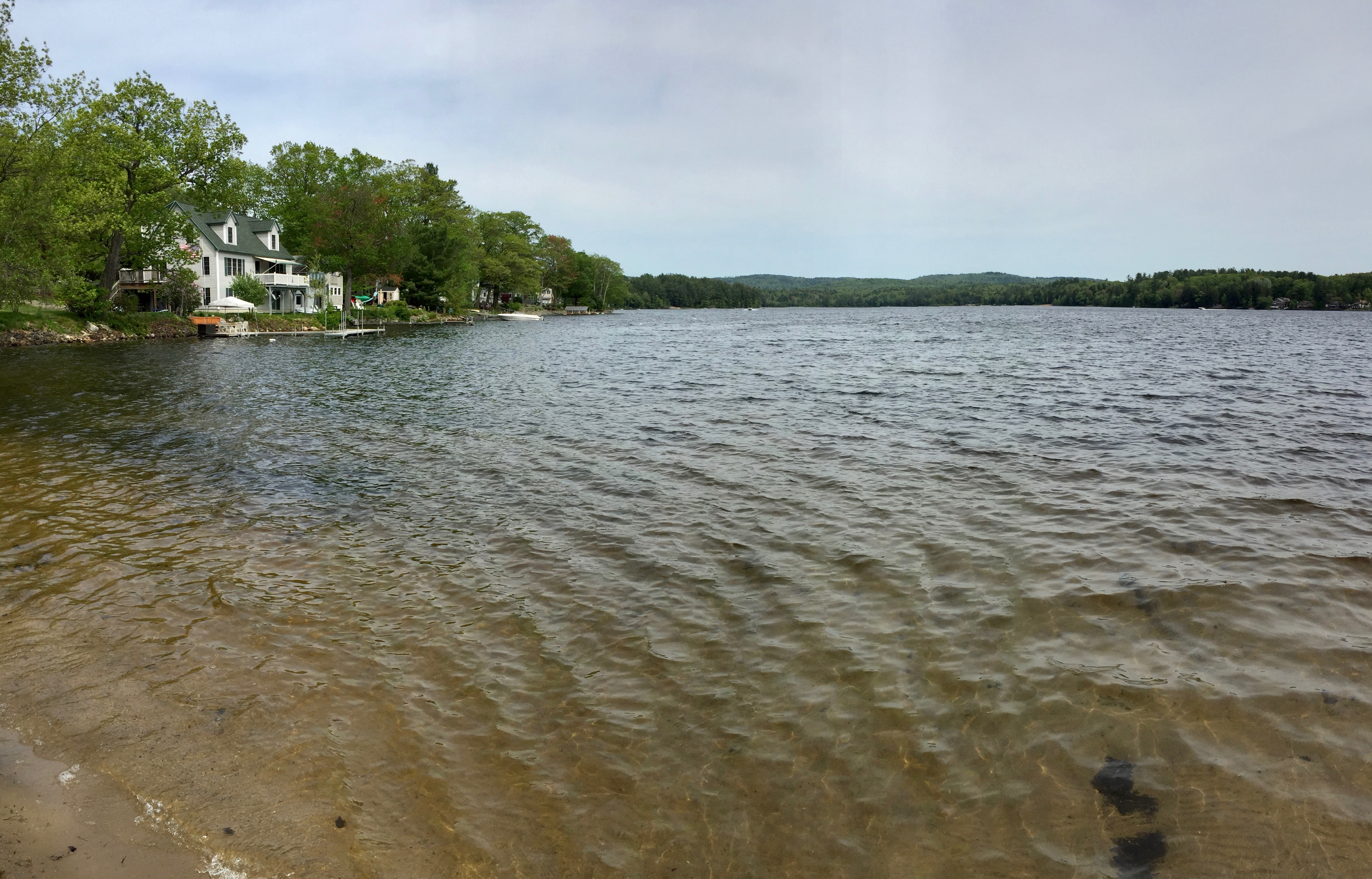
- Halfmoon Lake from NH 28

- Location within New Hampshire Location within the United States
- Location: Belknap County, New Hampshire
- Coordinates: 43°23′29″N 71°13′37″W
- Primary outflows: tributary of Webster Stream
- Basin countries: United States
- Max. length: 1.6 mi (2.6 km)
- Max. width: 0.4 mi (0.64 km)
- Surface area: 283 acres (1.15 km^{2})
- Average depth: 14 ft (4.3 m)
- Max. depth: 27 ft (8.2 m)
- Surface elevation: 640 ft (200 m)
- Settlements: Barnstead; Alton

Halfmoon Lake is a 283-acre (1.15 km^{2}) water body located in Belknap County in central New Hampshire, United States, in the towns of Barnstead and Alton. The pond is part of the Suncook River watershed, flowing south to the Merrimack River.

The lake is classified as a warmwater fishery, with observed species including largemouth bass, chain pickerel, horned pout, and white perch.

== See also ==
- List of lakes in New Hampshire
