= Bedford, New Hampshire =

- Town
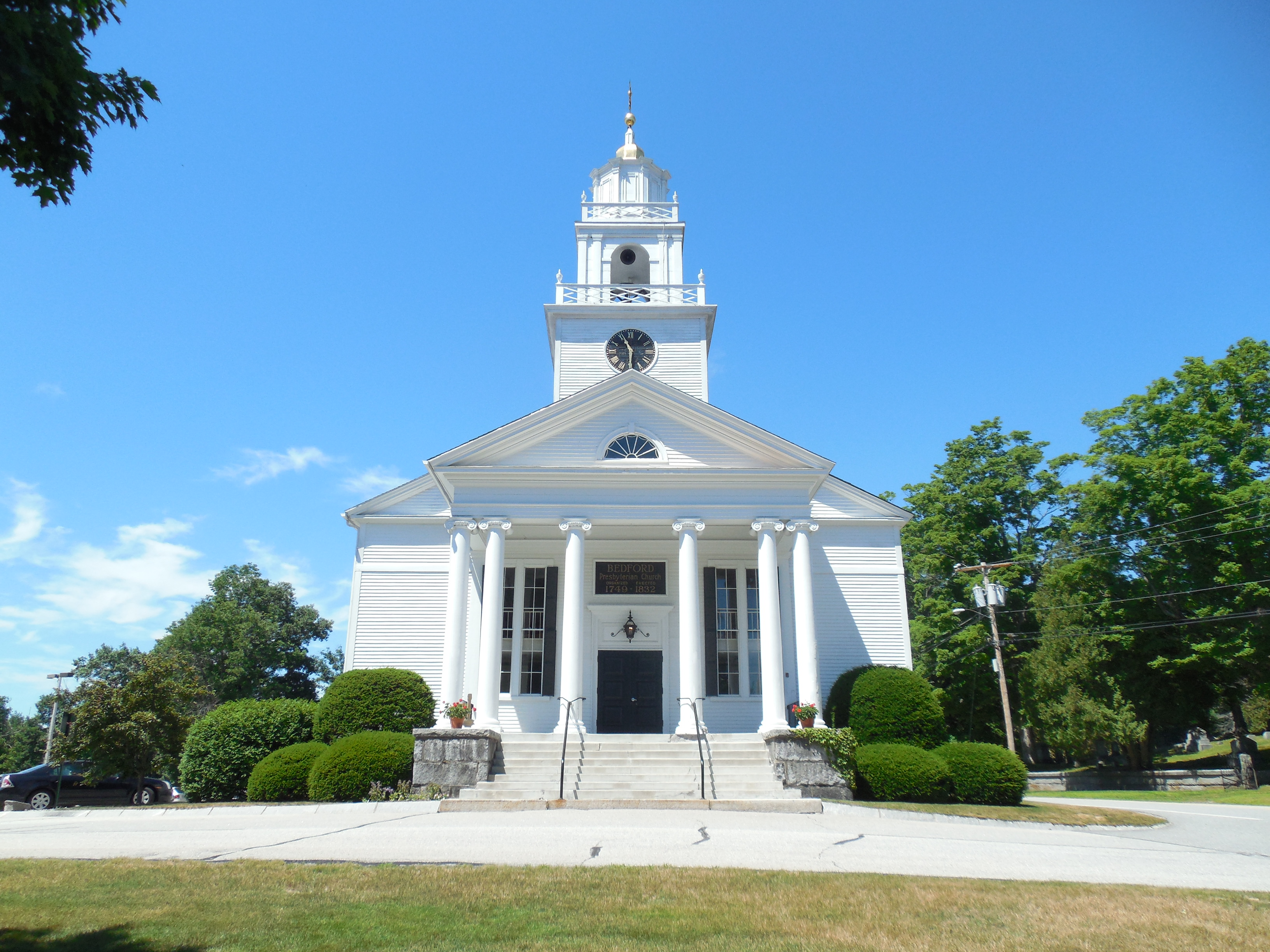
- Bedford Presbyterian Church

- Seal

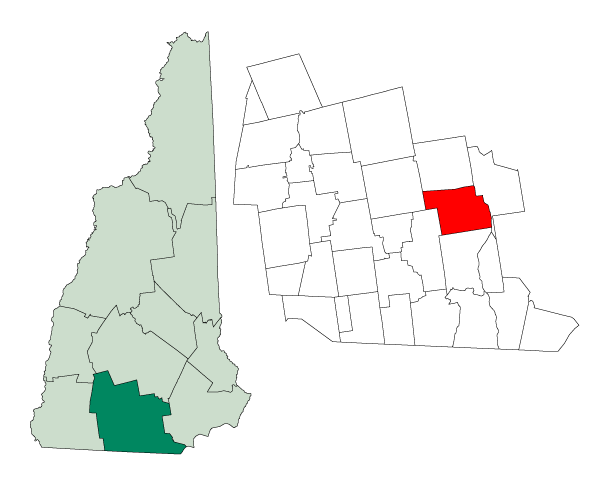
- Location in Hillsborough County, New Hampshire
- Coordinates: 42°56′17″N 71°30′47″W
- Country: United States
- State: New Hampshire
- County: Hillsborough
- Incorporated: 1750
- Named for: John Russell, 4th Duke of Bedford

Area
  - Total: 33.1 sq mi (85.6 km^{2})
  - Land: 32.8 sq mi (84.9 km^{2})
  - Water: 0.27 sq mi (0.7 km^{2}) 0.85%
- Elevation: 269 ft (82 m)

Population (2020)
  - Total: 23,322
  - Density: 711/sq mi (274.7/km^{2})
- Time zone: UTC−5 (Eastern)
  - Summer (DST): UTC−4 (Eastern)
- ZIP code: 03110
- Area code: 603
- FIPS code: 33-011-04500
- GNIS feature ID: 873541
- Website: www.bedfordnh.org

Bedford is a town in Hillsborough County, New Hampshire, United States. At the 2020 census, the population was 23,322, reflecting a growth of 10% from 2010. Bedford is a suburb of Manchester, New Hampshire's largest city.

== History ==
In 1733, the Province of Massachusetts Bay established Bedford as "Narragansett, No. 5" for the benefit of soldiers who fought against the Narragansett people in Rhode Island. The area was also known as "Souhegan East". The settlement was incorporated as "Bedford" in 1750, and was named for John Russell, 4th Duke of Bedford. Lord Russell, a close friend of Governor Benning Wentworth, was the Secretary of State for the Southern Department from 1748 to 1751, and his first wife, Diana Spencer, was cousin of the influential Duke of Marlborough.

The first English settlers in Bedford were Robert and James Walker III. A monument dated 1737 stands on what is now known as Station Road (adjacent to Hawthorne Drive), marking the first settlement. Bedford's first moderator was Mayor John Goffe, son of the Colonel John Goffe after whom Goffstown was named.

In 1874, Bedford was served by the Concord Railroad, and service by the Manchester and Ashburnham Railroad was being planned.

Bedford grew rapidly in the second half of the 20th century. The 2000 population of 18,274 was over eight times the population in 1950 of 2,176. Every decade in that period had a substantial rate of growth, ranging from 33 percent between 1980 and 1990 to a 67 percent increase between 1950 and 1960. As of the 2020 census, Bedford was the 11th largest municipality in the state, with a population of 23,322.

== Geography ==
According to the United States Census Bureau, the town has a total area of 33.1 square miles (85.6 km^{2}), of which 32.8 square miles (84.9 km^{2}) are land and 0.3 square miles (0.7 km^{2}) are water, comprising 0.85% of the town. The largest body of water other than the Merrimack River is Sebbins Pond, which is connected to smaller, neighboring bodies of water by Sebbins Brook.

A rock formation called Pulpit Rock (originally the Devil's Pulpit) is located in the northwestern part of the town on New Boston Road and is the feature of the town-owned Pulpit Rock Conservation Area. The highest point in Bedford is Holbrook Hill, at 845 feet (258 m) above sea level, located in the extreme northwestern corner of town. Bedford lies fully within the Merrimack River watershed.

== Transportation ==
Two major highways run through Bedford. The Everett Turnpike runs north-south, and Route 101 runs east-west. The segment of the Everett Turnpike north of NH 101 and the segment of NH 101 east of the Everett Turnpike are designated Interstate 293; I-293 turns at this interchange. The portion of Route 101 in eastern Bedford from New Hampshire Route 114 to the Manchester border is a freeway, while the remainder of the route through the town is a surface road. US 3 also runs through Bedford.

Manchester–Boston Regional Airport is one town away, in Manchester.

A proposed extension of the MBTA Commuter Rail's Lowell Line would see trains being extended to the neighboring city of Manchester, making stops at Nashua and Bedford along the way. The proposed Bedford/MHT station stop would be located in Bedford underneath the Raymond Wieczorek Drive Bridge, and is intended to serve both the town of Bedford and Manchester-Boston Regional Airport.

== Government and politics ==
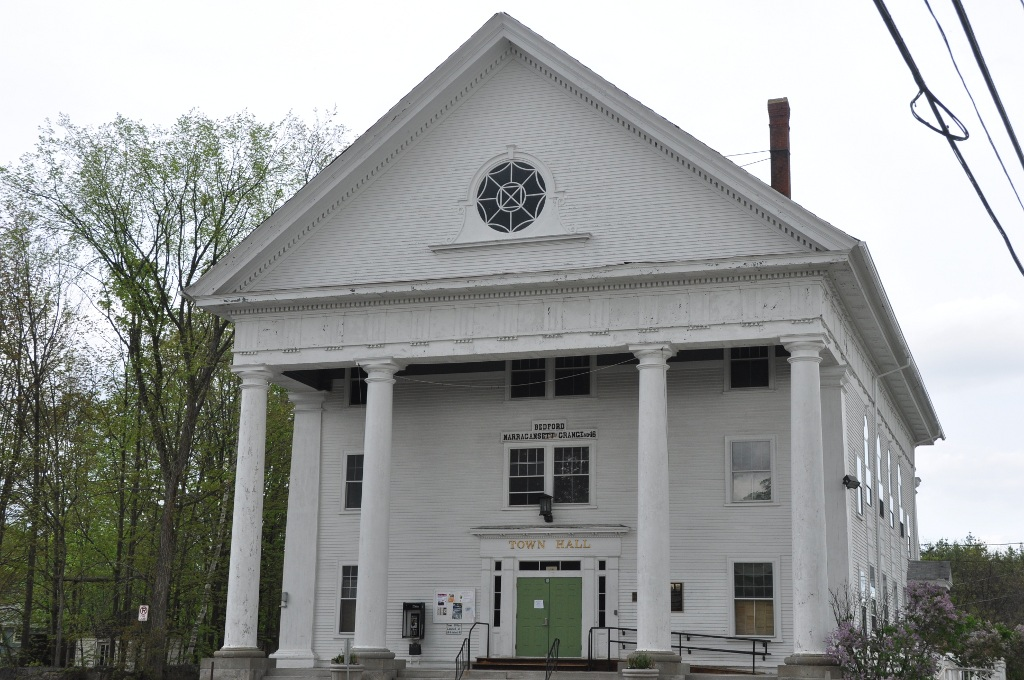
Bedford Town Hall

Bedford is part of New Hampshire's 1st congressional district, currently represented by Democrat Chris Pappas. Bedford is part of the Executive Council of New Hampshire's 4th district, currently represented by Republican Ted Gatsas. In the State Senate, Bedford is part of New Hampshire's 9th State Senate district, currently represented by Republican Denise Ricciardi. Bedford is currently represented in the New Hampshire House of Representatives by Ted Gorski, Linda Gould, Kristin Noble, Brian Labrie, Loren Foxx, John Schneller, and Catherine Rombeau.

Bedford has long been a Republican stronghold in New Hampshire, voting for the GOP presidential nominee as far back as records are available. In 2020, the Republican winning streak in Bedford was finally broken as Democrat Joe Biden won the town with approximately 51.5% of the vote. The Democratic trend continued when Kamala Harris, the Democratic nominee in the 2024 United States presidential election, won the town with just under 51% of the vote.

Bedford was one of only four towns in New Hampshire where Democrats backed Hillary Rodham Clinton when she sought the Democratic nomination for president in both 2008 and 2016.

Bedford town vote by party in presidential elections
Year	Democratic	Republican	Third parties
2024	50.7% 7,444	47.4% 6,963	1.9% 275
2020	51.0% 7,521	47.8% 7,052	1.1% 166
2016	44.1% 5,851	51.4% 6,816	4.4% 600
2012	36.7% 4,713	62.3% 7,990	0.9% 114
2008	40.5% 5,115	59.2% 7,442	0.6% 61
2004	37.1% 4,047	62.6% 6,836	0.3% 37
2000	35.3% 3,624	62.2% 6,381	2.5% 256
1996	37.8% 3,064	55.1% 4,467	6.7% 573
1992	27.8% 2,251	51.3% 4,145	20.8% 1,685
1988	22.0% 1,499	77.0% 5,237	1.0% 69
1984	19.4% 1,034	80.4% 4,294	0.3% 13
1980	17.9% 853	71.3% 3,400	10.8% 513
1976	31.7% 1,059	67.1% 2,240	1.0% 34
1972	21.1% 655	75.9% 2,360	3.1% 96

Bedford town election results from state and federal races
Year	Office	Results
2010	Senator	Ayotte 73–25%
2010	House	Guinta 65–31%
2010	Governor	Stephen 52–46%
2012	President	Romney 62–37%
2012	House	Guinta 60–37%
2012	Governor	Lamontagne 59–39%
2014	Senator	Brown 62–38%
2014	House	Guinta 63–37%
2014	Governor	Havenstein 61–39%
2016	President	Trump 51–44%
2016	Senator	Ayotte 59–38%
2016	House	Guinta 50–37%
2016	Governor	Sununu 59–38%
2018	House	Pappas 50–49%
2018	Governor	Sununu 62–37%
2020	President	Biden 51–48%
2020	Senator	Shaheen 54–45%
2020	House	Mowers 49–49%
2020	Governor	Sununu 71–28%
2022	Senator	Hassan 51–47%
2022	House	Pappas 52–48%
2022	Governor	Sununu 63–36%
2024	President	Harris 51–47%
2024	House	Pappas 54–46%
2024	Governor	Ayotte 58–41%

== Demographics ==
Historical population
Census	Pop.	Note	%±
1790	898		—
1800	1,182		31.6%
1810	1,296		9.6%
1820	1,375		6.1%
1830	1,554		13.0%
1840	1,549		−0.3%
1850	1,914		23.6%
1860	1,172		−38.8%
1870	1,221		4.2%
1880	1,204		−1.4%
1890	1,102		−8.5%
1900	1,148		4.2%
1910	1,110		−3.3%
1920	1,118		0.7%
1930	1,326		18.6%
1940	1,561		17.7%
1950	2,176		39.4%
1960	3,636		67.1%
1970	5,859		61.1%
1980	9,481		61.8%
1990	12,563		32.5%
2000	18,274		45.5%
2010	21,203		16.0%
2020	23,322		10.0%
2024 (est.)	23,856		2.3%
U.S. Decennial Census

2020 census demographics
Race	Percentage
White, not Hispanic or Latino	86%
Asian	7%
Hispanic or Latino	3%
Black or African American	2%

As of the 2020 census, there were 23,322 people residing in the town. The population density was 707 people per square mile. The racial makeup of the town was 86.1% White, 1.5% African American, 1.2% Native American, 7.2% Asian, 0.1% Pacific Islander, 0.4% from some other race, and 1.4% from two or more races. Hispanic or Latino of any race were 3.2% of the population.

As of the 2010 census, There were 7,364 households, out of which 40.9% had children under the age of 18 living with them, 69.8% were headed by married couples living together, 6.5% had a female householder with no husband present, and 20.8% were non-families. 16.5% of all households were made up of individuals, and 7.6% were someone living alone who was 65 years of age or older. The average household size was 2.81 and the average family size was 3.19.

In the town, the age distribution of the population shows 28.6% under the age of 18, 4.7% from 18 to 24, 21.4% from 25 to 44, 31.7% from 45 to 64, and 13.5% who were 65 years of age or older. The median age was 42.3 years. For every 100 females, there were 95.7 males. For every 100 females aged 18 and over, there were 92.1 males.

For the period 2006–2010, the median income for a household in the town was $116,299 (in 2010 dollars), and the median income for a family was $127,589. Full-time male workers had median earnings of $99,366 versus $53,286 for females. The per capita income for the town was $50,952. About 2.7% of families and 3.4% of the population were below the poverty line, including 4.2% of those under age 18 and 1.0% of those age 65 or over. Bedford had the fifth highest average personal income in the state between 2006 and 2010.

== Education ==
The school district is the Bedford School District. There are six schools in Bedford: Memorial Elementary School (National Blue Ribbon School awardee in 2012), Peter Woodbury Elementary School, and Riddle Brook Elementary (National Blue Ribbon School awardee in 2017 and 2023) are neighborhood elementary schools that serve grades K through 4. McKelvie Intermediate School accommodates grades 5 and 6. Ross A. Lurgio Middle School and Bedford High School have served grades 7–8 and 9–12, respectively, since their establishment in 2007.

Ross A. Lurgio Middle School and Bedford High School comprise one 300,000 sq ft (28,000 m^{2}) building. The unified construction aimed to take advantage of economies of scale by allowing the schools to share a kitchen, an auditorium, and security guards, but they operate as separate schools with different entrances, bus schedules, start times and end times. Additionally, key-controlled access is required to move between schools.

A portion of Saint Anselm College is located in Bedford. This includes some athletic fields.

Previously Bedford had an agreement with the Manchester School District so that students were sent to Manchester West High School. In 2005 about 900 high school aged residents of Bedford attended Manchester West. Beginning in fall 2007 Bedford stopped sending new students to Manchester West, so it could instead send them to Bedford High. By fall 2009 Bedford no longer sent any levels to Manchester West.

== Notable people ==
- Silas Aiken (1799–1869), minister, author
- David Atwood (1815–1889), newspaperman, U.S. congressman from Wisconsin; born in Bedford
- Josh Bauer (born 1998), soccer player
- Chris Carpenter (born 1975), pitcher with the St. Louis Cardinals
- Zachariah Chandler (1813–1879), U.S. Secretary of the Interior 1875–1877, U.S. senator from Michigan; born in Bedford
- John Goffe (1701–1786), colonial soldier, other names, "Hunter John"
- Carrie Jones (born 1982), bestselling author of young adult novels; born in Bedford
- Dean Kamen (born 1951), inventor of the Segway HT and the iBOT; owner of Manchester-based DEKA Corporation
- Grant Lavigne (born 1999), minor-league baseball player in the Colorado Rockies system
- Josh Meyers (born 1976), actor, comedian
- Seth Meyers (born 1973), comedian, talk-show host (Saturday Night Live, Late Night with Seth Meyers)
- Mace Moulton (1796–1867), U.S. congressman 1845–1847 (D, NH-AL)
- Rand Pecknold (born 1967), Quinnipiac men's ice hockey coach, 500-game winner in NCAA ice hockey
- Patricia Racette (born 1965), opera singer
- Laura Silverman (born 1966), actress, older sister of actress and comedian Sarah Silverman
- Sarah Silverman (born 1970), comedian, voice actress, writer
- Alex Steeves (born 1999), hockey player for the Toronto Maple Leafs
- John E. Sununu (born 1964), Republican U.S. senator (2003–2009); older brother of former New Hampshire governor Chris Sununu
- Peter Woodbury (1899–1970), judge of the United States Court of Appeals for the First Circuit
- Triple H (born 1969), WWE wrestler

== See also ==
- 1993 Little League World Series, when a team from Bedford advanced to the semi-finals
