= Webster, New Hampshire =

- Town
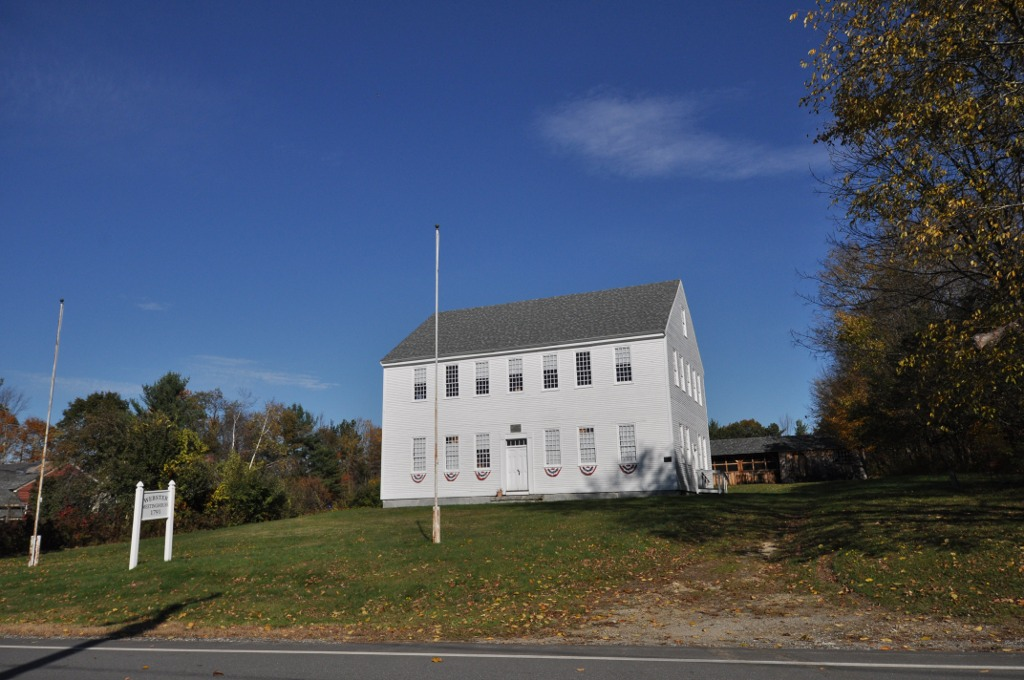
- The Old Webster Meeting House

- Seal

- Location in Merrimack County and the state of New Hampshire.
- Coordinates: 43°17′59″N 71°43′08″W
- Country: United States
- State: New Hampshire
- County: Merrimack
- Incorporated: 1860
- Villages: Webster; Swetts Mills

Area
  - Total: 28.8 sq mi (74.6 km^{2})
  - Land: 28.2 sq mi (73.1 km^{2})
  - Water: 0.58 sq mi (1.5 km^{2}) 2.02%
- Elevation: 528 ft (161 m)

Population (2020)
  - Total: 1,913
  - Density: 68/sq mi (26.2/km^{2})
- Time zone: UTC-5 (Eastern)
  - Summer (DST): UTC-4 (Eastern)
- ZIP code: 03303
- Area code: 603
- FIPS code: 33-80020
- GNIS feature ID: 873750
- Website: www.webster-nh.gov

Webster is a town in Merrimack County, New Hampshire, United States. The population was 1,913 at the 2020 census.

== History ==
A part of Boscawen until 1860, the town takes its name from American statesman Daniel Webster.

== Geography ==
According to the United States Census Bureau, the town has a total area of 28.8 square miles (74.6 km^{2}), of which 28.2 square miles (73.1 km^{2}) are land and 0.58 square miles (1.5 km^{2}) are water, comprising 2.02% of the town. The Blackwater River flows from north to south through the town, leading to the Contoocook River in Hopkinton. The entire town is part of the Merrimack River watershed. The highest point in Webster is 870 feet (270 m) above sea level, on an unnamed summit near the center of town that overlooks the eastern shore of Lake Winnepocket.

=== Adjacent municipalities ===
- Salisbury (north)
- Boscawen (east)
- Concord (southeast)
- Hopkinton (south)
- Warner (west)

== Demographics ==
Historical population
Census	Pop.	Note	%±
1870	689		—
1880	647		−6.1%
1890	564		−12.8%
1900	496		−12.1%
1910	445		−10.3%
1920	334		−24.9%
1930	360		7.8%
1940	351		−2.5%
1950	386		10.0%
1960	457		18.4%
1970	680		48.8%
1980	1,095		61.0%
1990	1,405		28.3%
2000	1,579		12.4%
2010	1,872		18.6%
2020	1,913		2.2%
U.S. Decennial Census

At the 2000 census there were 1,579 people, 581 households, and 464 families living in the town. The population density was 56.6 inhabitants per square mile (21.9/km^{2}). There were 672 housing units at an average density of 24.1 per square mile (9.3/km^{2}). The racial makeup of the town was 98.86% White, 0.06% African American, 0.06% Native American, 0.38% Asian, 0.06% from other races, and 0.57% from two or more races. Hispanic or Latino of any race were 0.13%.

Of the 581 households 34.9% had children under the age of 18 living with them, 68.3% were married couples living together, 7.4% had a female householder with no husband present, and 20.1% were non-families. 14.5% of households were one person and 4.6% were one person aged 65 or older. The average household size was 2.71 and the average family size was 2.99.

The age distribution was 25.8% under the age of 18, 5.3% from 18 to 24, 31.7% from 25 to 44, 27.9% from 45 to 64, and 9.2% 65 or older. The median age was 39 years. For every 100 females, there were 94.0 males. For every 100 females age 18 and over, there were 93.2 males.

The median household income was $54,052 and the median family income was $57,396. Males had a median income of $35,449 versus $24,250 for females. The per capita income for the town was $20,852. About 3.6% of families and 5.0% of the population were below the poverty line, including 5.0% of those under age 18 and 5.4% of those age 65 or over.
