= School segregation in the United States =

Racial separation in schools

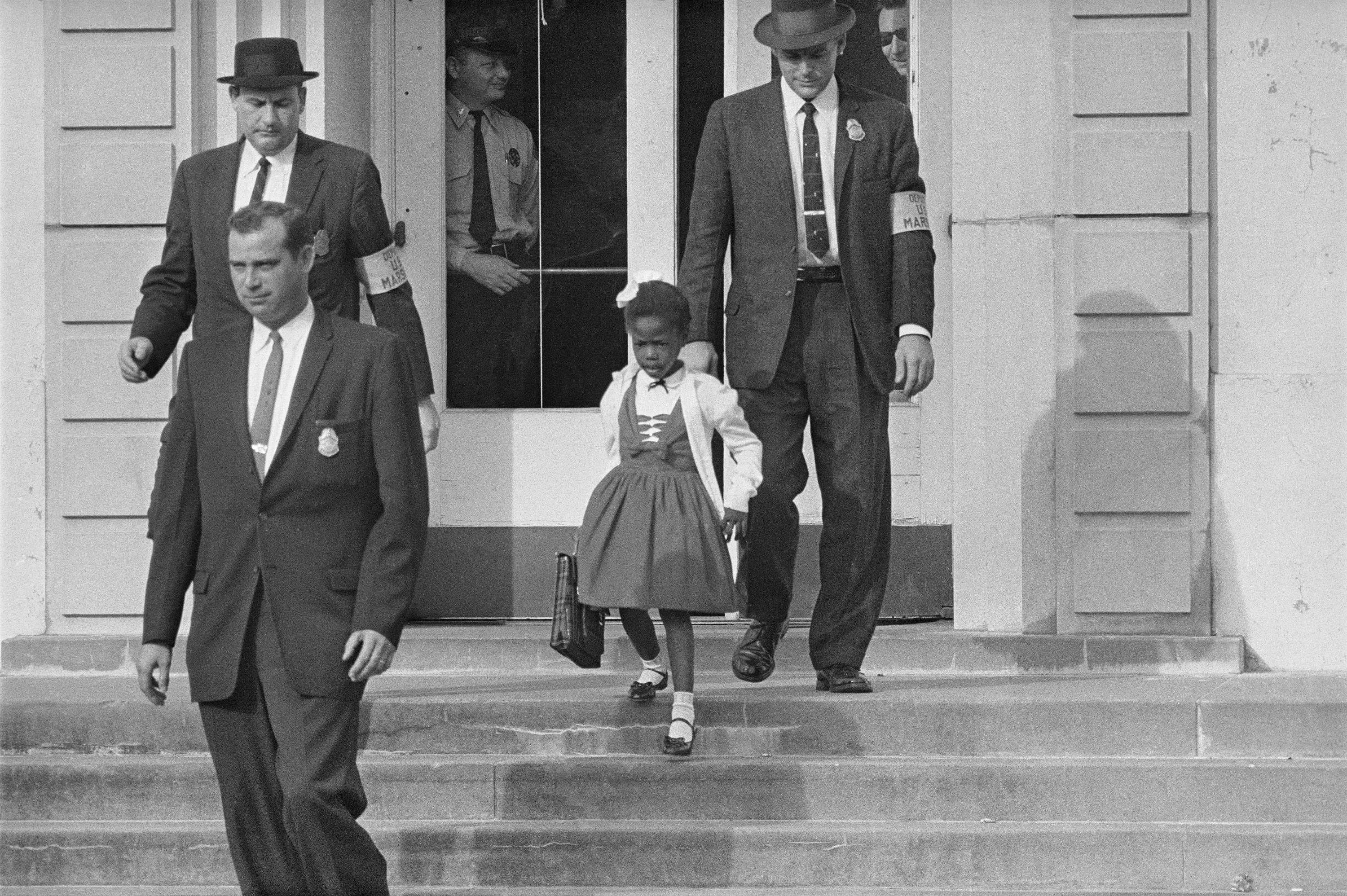
In 1960, U.S. marshals were needed to escort Ruby Bridges to and from school in New Orleans, Louisiana, as she broke the State of Louisiana's segregation rules.

In the United States, school students were often segregated based on their race. While not prohibited from having or attending schools, various minorities were barred from most schools that admitted white students. Segregation was enforced by laws in U.S. states, primarily in the Southern United States, although segregation could also occur in informal systems or through social expectations and norms in other areas of the country. Segregation laws were met with resistance by Civil Rights activists and began to be challenged in the 1930s in cases that eventually reached the U.S. Supreme Court.

Segregation continued longstanding exclusionary policies in much of the Southern United States (where most African Americans lived) after the Civil War. Jim Crow laws codified segregation. These laws were influenced by the history of slavery and discrimination in the US. Secondary schools for African Americans in the South were called training schools instead of high schools in order to appease racist whites and focused on vocational education. School integration in the United States took place at different times in different areas and often met resistance. After the ruling of Brown v. Board of Education in 1954, which invalidated segregated-schooling laws, school segregation took de facto form. School segregation declined rapidly during the late 1960s and early 1970s as the government became strict on schools' plans to combat segregation more effectively as a result of Green v. County School Board of New Kent County. Voluntary segregation by income appears to have increased since 1990.

Racial segregation has either increased or stayed constant since 1990, depending on which definition of segregation is used. In general, definitions based on the amount of interaction between black and white students (exposure definitions) show increased racial segregation, while definitions based on the proportion of black and white students in different schools (unevenness definitions) show racial segregation remaining approximately constant. Residential segregation in the United States and school choice, both historically and currently, have had a considerable effect on school segregation. Not only does the current segregation of neighborhoods and schools in the US affect social issues and practices, but it is considered by some to be a factor in the achievement gap between black and white students. Some authors such as Jerry Roziek and Ta-Nehisi Coates highlight the importance of tackling the root concept of racism instead of desegregation efforts that arise as a result of the end of de jure segregation. Along with educational and social outcomes, the average income and occupational aspirations of minority households that are products of segregated schooling have worse outcomes than the products of desegregated schooling.

More than half of students in the United States attend school districts with high concentrations of people (over 75%) of their own ethnicity and about 40% of black students attend schools where 90%-100% of students are non-white. Blacks, "Mongolians" (Chinese), Japanese, Latino, and Native American students were segregated in California. Native American children faced separation from their families and forced assimilation programs at boarding schools. But there were also cases where Native Americans successfully challenged school segregation and won access to public schools.

== Historical segregation ==
=== Antebellum era ===
African Free School was in New York City in the 18th century. Education during the slave period in the United States was limited. Richard Humphreys, Samuel Powers Emlen Jr, and Prudence Crandall established schools for African Americans in the decades preceding the Civil War.

In 1832, Prudence Crandall admitted an African American girl to her all-white Canterbury Female Boarding School in Canterbury, Connecticut, which was the subject of public backlash and protests. She converted the boarding school to one for only African American girls, but Crandall was jailed for her efforts for violating a Black Law. In 1835, an anti-abolitionist mob attacked and destroyed Noyes Academy, an integrated school in Canaan, New Hampshire founded by abolitionists in New England. In 1849, the Massachusetts Supreme Court ruled that segregated schools were allowed under the Constitution of Massachusetts (Roberts v. City of Boston). Emlen Institution was a boarding school for African American and Native American orphans in Ohio and then Pennsylvania. Richard Humphreys (philanthropist) bequeathed money to establish the Institute for Colored Youth in Philadelphia. Yale Law School co-founder, judge, and mayor of New Haven David Daggett was a leader in the fight against schools for African Americans and helped block plans for a college for African Americans in New Haven, Connecticut.

Black schools were established by some religious groups and philanthropists to educate African Americans. Oberlin Academy was one of the early schools to integrate. Lowell High School also accepted African American students.

=== Reconstruction era ===
Jim Crow laws in the Southern United States (shaded red) required school segregation, 1877–1954. Other states outside the south prohibited school segregation (green) or allowed local choice (blue).

The formal segregation of black and white people began following the end of the Reconstruction Era in 1877. The United States Supreme Court's Dred Scott v. Sandford decision upheld the denial of citizenship to African Americans and found that descendants of slaves are "so far inferior that they had no rights which the white man was bound to respect."

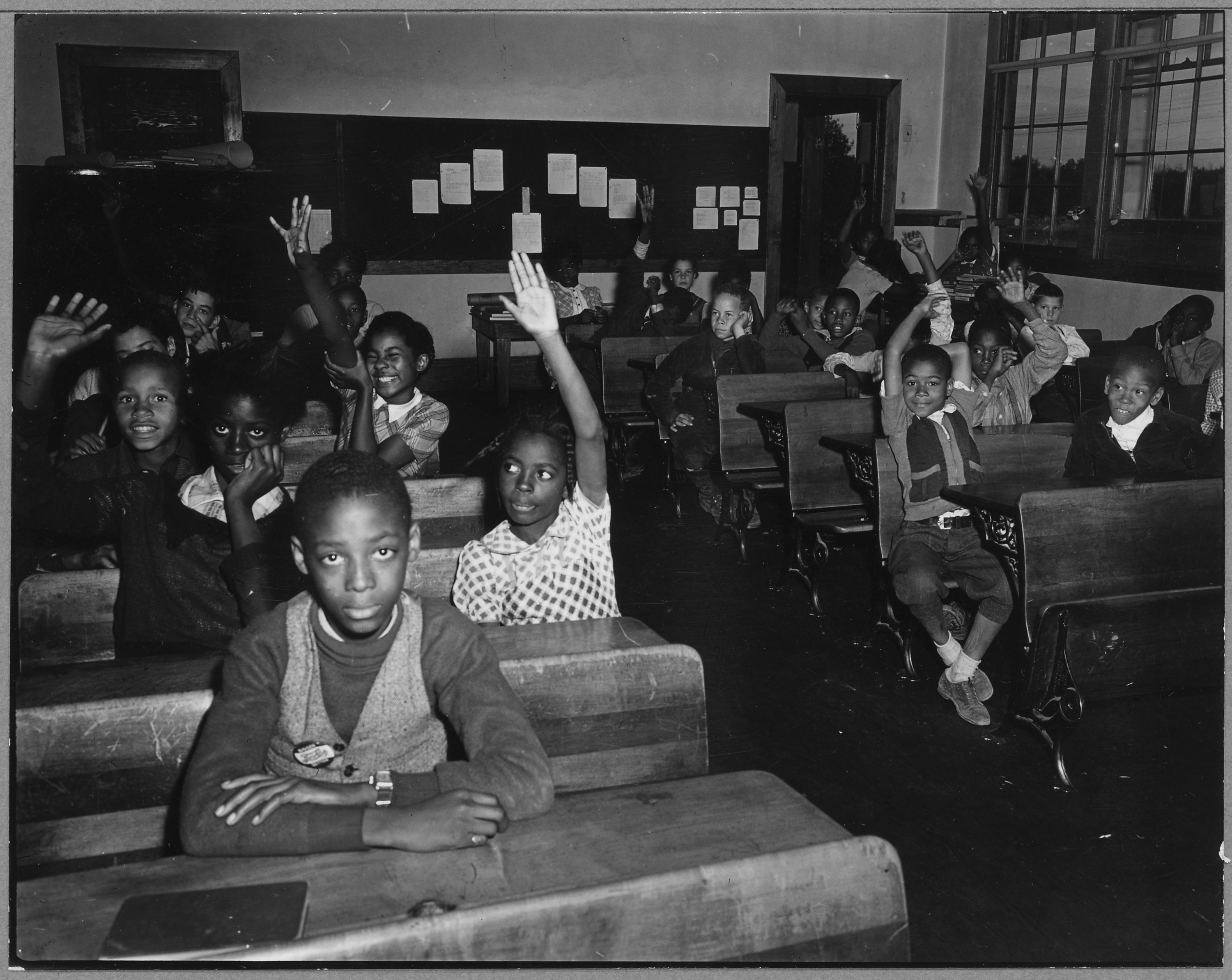
Students in a one-room school in Waldorf, Maryland (1941)

Following the American Civil War, the Thirteenth Amendment was ratified and ended slavery nationwide. The Fourteenth Amendment, guaranteeing equal protection under the law, was ratified in 1868, and citizenship was extended to African Americans. Congress also passed the Civil Rights Act of 1875, banning racial discrimination in public accommodations. But in 1883, the Supreme Court struck down the Civil Rights Act of 1875, finding that discrimination by individuals or private businesses was constitutional.

=== Jim Crow era ===
The Dunning School at Columbia University, provided the intellectual underpinning for Jim Crow era discrimination. Segregation continued in de jure form with the passage of Jim Crow laws in the 19th century. The Reconstruction era saw efforts at integration in the South, but discriminatory laws were also passed by state legislatures in the South and parts of the lower Midwest and Southwest, segregating public schools. These stated that schools should be separated by race and offer equal amenities, but conditions were far from equal. The constitutionality of Jim Crow laws was upheld in the Supreme Court's decision in Plessy v. Ferguson (1896), which ruled that separate facilities for black and white people were permissible provided that the facilities were of equal quality.

=== New Deal era ===
Franklin D. Roosevelt enacted housing reforms that focused their benefits on home buying aid to only white Americans. These restrictions in loans further separated black and white neighborhoods, which introduced the long term effects of residential segregation projects on schooling. The boundaries housing projects were intentionally drawn so that black neighborhoods had less access to education and jobs. This depletion of resources led to an increase in poverty rates which broadened academic achievement gaps.

The establishment of the NAACP Legal Defense and Educational Fund (LDF) in 1939 serves as the foundation of the efforts and funding to challenge school segregation. Charles Hamilton Houston initially ran the LDF, and focused heavily on proving that black schools were severely unequal to white schools Eventually, the LDF shifted its leadership to Thurgood Marshall, who became the first director of the LDF and was a leader in significant court battles including Brown v. Board of Education.

=== Civil Rights era ===
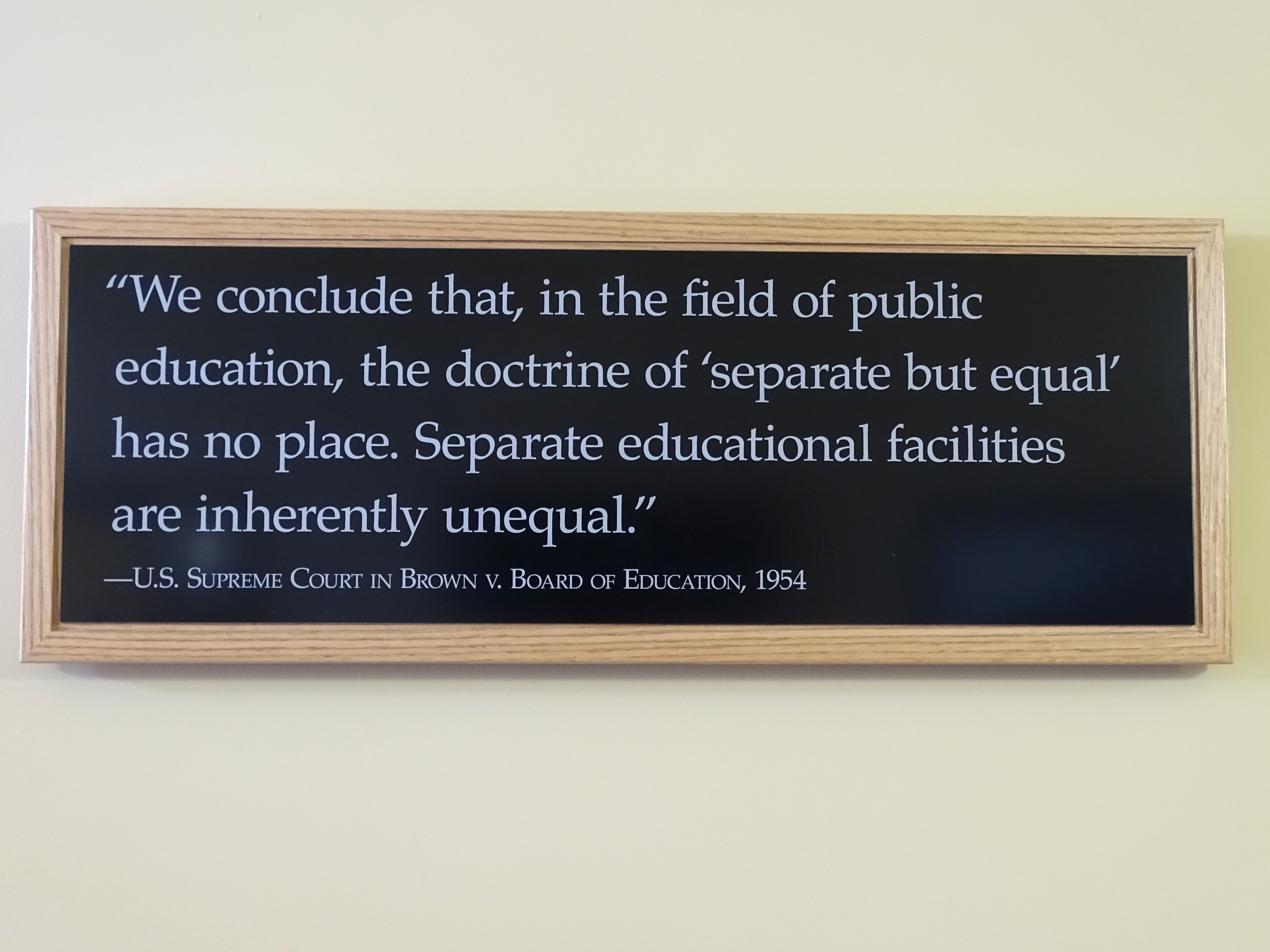
Quote from Supreme Court Decision in Brown v. Board of Education case, hung at the Historic Site in Topeka, Kansas, USA

Plessy v. Ferguson was overturned in 1954, when the Supreme Court ruling in Brown v. Board of Education ended de jure segregation in the United States. The state of Arkansas would experience some of the first successful school integrations below the Mason–Dixon line. In the decade following Brown, the South resisted enforcement of the Court's decision. States and school districts did little to reduce segregation, and schools remained almost completely segregated until 1968, after Congressional passage of civil rights legislation. In response to pressures to desegregate in the public school system, some white communities started private segregated schools, but rulings in Green v. Connally (1971) and Runyon v. McCrary (1976) prohibited racial discrimination in private schools and revoked IRS-granted non-profit status of schools in violation. Desegregation efforts reached their peak in the late 1960s and early 1970s, when the South transitioned from complete segregation to being the nation's most integrated region.

=== Mexican-American segregation during these eras ===
While African Americans faced legal segregation in civil society, Mexican Americans often dealt with de facto segregation, meaning no federal laws explicitly barred their access to schools or other public facilities, yet they were still separated from white people. The proponents of Mexican-American segregation were often officials who worked at the state and local school level and often defended the creation and sustaining of separate "Mexican schools". Prior to the 1930s, segregation of Mexican children in schools was a rarity. Following the Great Depression, funding from the New Deal and legislation such as the 1934 Sugar Act enabled the creation of segregated schools for Mexican American children in Wyoming. An example of Mexican-American school segregation is from the city of Oxnard, California. According to the district records, the schools and neighborhoods in Oxnard were segregated based on ethnicity. The number of Latino migrants in Oxnard was climbing, causing overcrowding in the schools, which triggered local officials to "solve" this issue by creating a "school-within-a-school" form of segregation, and eventually by establishing a separate school for Latino students. School segregation occurred due to the residential segregation that was also present in Oxnard. By placing restrictive policies and covenants on properties, officials in Oxnard were able to keep Latino residents in a separate neighborhood from the "American" (or non-Latino residents), which provided a justification for segregating the schools. The segregation of Mexican children occurred throughout much of the U.S. West. During the Depression era in Wyoming, the segregation of Mexican children—whether they were US citizens or not—mirrored Jim Crow laws. The segregation of Mexicans also took place in Colorado, Montana, Nebraska, and Texas. The Blackwell School in Texas is one of the few remaining formerly de facto segregated Mexican school buildings.

Parents of Mexican-American students challenged school segregation themselves and won by boycotting the newly segregated school and taking the school board to court, as happened with 75 students in the historic 1931 case commonly known as the Lemon Grove Incident (Roberto Alvarez vs. the board of trustees of the Lemon Grove School District). The Lemon Grove case paved the way for another historic case in 1946, when a group of 5 Mexican-American parents challenged Westminster school district (Mendez v. Westminster) in federal court, successfully proving that the segregation of Mexican-Americans in public schools in California was unconstitutional, and setting a precedent for future cases.

Parents of both African-American and Mexican-American students also challenged school segregation in coordination with civil rights organizations such as the NAACP, ACLU, and LULAC. Both groups challenged discriminatory policies in court, with varying success. The NAACP initially challenged graduate and professional school segregation asserting that desegregation at this level would result in the least backlash and opposition by whites.

=== Catholic schools ===
Initially, Catholic schools in the South generally followed the pattern of segregation in public schools, sometimes enforced by law. However, most Catholic dioceses began moving ahead of public schools to desegregate. Prior to the desegregation of public schools, St. Louis was the first city to desegregate its Catholic schools in 1947. Following this, Catholic schools followed in Mississippi (1965), Atlanta (1962), Tennessee (1954), and Washington, DC (1948). Due to different integration plans in different locations, some schools decided to desegregate before public schools in their own communities. The first African American Catholic schools were established in states with large Catholic populations and a history of slavery, such as Maryland and Louisiana.

=== Protestant schools ===
In the late 1950s and early 1960s, when some states (including Alabama, Virginia, and Louisiana) closed their public schools to protest integration, Jerry Falwell Sr. took the opportunity to open "Christian academies" for white students.

== Contemporary segregation ==
School desegregation in the southern states from 1953 to 1976. Note that "integrated school" is defined as a school with at least one white and one black student, thus underestimating the extent of de facto segregation.

=== Segregation since the 1960s ===
From 1968 to 1980, segregation declined. School integration peaked in the 1980s and then gradually declined over the course of the 1990s. In the 1990s and early 2000s, minority students attended schools with a declining proportion of white students, so that the rate of segregation as measured as isolation resembled that of the 1960s. A study by The Civil Rights Project found that in the 2016 to 2017 school year, nearly half of all black and Latino students in the U.S. went to schools where the student population was 90% people of color, while the average white student went to schools that were 69% white. There is some disagreement about trends since the 1980s; while some researchers presented trends as evidence of "resegregation," others argue that changing demographics in school districts, including class and income, are responsible for most of the changes in the racial composition of schools. A 2013 study by Jeremy Fiel found that, "for the most part, compositional changes are to blame for the declining presence of whites in minorities' schools," and that racial balance increased from 1993 to 2010. The study found that minority students became more isolated and less exposed to whites within a school although districts were statistically more integrated. Another 2013 study found that segregation measures increased over the previous 25 years due to changing demographics. The study did not find an increase in racial balance. Racial unequality remained stable. Researcher Kori Stroub found that the "racial/ethnic resegregation of public schools observed over the 1990s gave way to a period of modest reintegration," but segregation between school districts increased even though within-district segregation is low. Fiel believed that increasing interdistrict segregation would exacerbate racial isolation.

=== Sources ===
==== Residential segregation ====
A source of school segregation is residential segregation. Residence and school assignment are linked due to the tradition of locally controlled schools. Residential segregation is related to growing income inequality in the United States.

The deterioration of cities and urban education systems between the 1950-80s was the consequence of several post-war policies like the Home Owners' Loans Corporation, Federal Housing Administration, Interstate Highway Act, and discriminatory zoning practices. The loss of war-time industrial employment perpetuated 'white flight' and suburban sprawl at the expense of poor, marginalized urban residents. Mid-20th century urban divestment and suburban development redirected social services and federal funding to predominantly white residencies. Remaining urban residents witnessed dramatic decreases in quality of living, creating countless barriers to a stable life, including in academic success. Consequently, urban school districts became relatively accurate measures for documenting the increasing educational inequalities among students of color.

A study conducted by Sean Reardon and John Yun found that from 1990 to 2000, residential black/white and Hispanic/white segregation declined by a modest amount in the United States, while public school segregation increased slightly during the same time period. Because the two variables moved in opposite directions, changes in residential patterns were not responsible for changes in school segregation trends. Rather, the study determined that in 1990, schools showed less segregation than neighborhoods, indicating that local policies were helping to ameliorate the effects of residential segregation on school composition. By 2000, however, racial composition of schools had become more closely correlated to neighborhood composition, indicating that public policies no longer redistributed students as evenly as before.

In the 2005 Civil Rights Project conducted at Harvard University, researchers reported that over 80% of high-minority schools—where the student population is over 90% non-white—are high poverty schools as indicated by a large majority qualifying for free and reduced lunch. Additionally, of five million enrolled students in two dozen of the largest central cities, 70% are black and Latino students in predominantly minority-majority, urban schools.

Another study targets spatial inequalities and student outcomes based on the physical and social presence in specific neighborhoods. Factors like pollution, perceived safety, proximity to other students, and healthy learning environments can all affect academic outcomes of various student groups. In correspondence to high poverty environments, students are likely to face various obstacles that prevent effective learning environments including food and housing insecurity. Likewise, black, Latino, and Indigenous students experience twice the exposure to poor students than their Asian and white counterparts.

Researcher Peter Katel addressed the resegregation of schools as barriers for poor students in inner-city neighborhoods who are unprepared for higher education. Katel also reported that educational experts viewed high densities of marginalized students as a loss of funding that most white families do not experience, because they are more likely to have the capability to attend different schools. A 2013 study corroborated these findings, showing that the relationship between residential and school segregation became stronger between 2000 and 2010. In 2000, segregation of black people in schools was lower than in their neighborhoods; by 2010, the two patterns of segregation were "nearly identical".

==== Supreme Court rulings ====
The Court's 1970 ruling in Swann v. Charlotte-Mecklenburg Board of Education furthered desegregation efforts by upholding busing as constitutional, but the ruling had no effect on the increasing segregation between school districts. The court's ruling in Milliken v. Bradley in 1974 prohibited interdistrict desegregation by busing.

The 1990 decision in Board of Education of Oklahoma City v. Dowell declared that once schools districts had made a practicable, "good faith" effort to desegregate, they could be declared to have achieved "unitary" status, releasing them from court oversight. The decision allowed schools to end previous desegregation efforts even in cases where a return to segregation was likely. The court's ruling in Freeman v. Pitts went further, ruling that districts could be released from oversight in "incremental stages", meaning that courts would continue to supervise only those aspects of integration that had not yet been achieved.

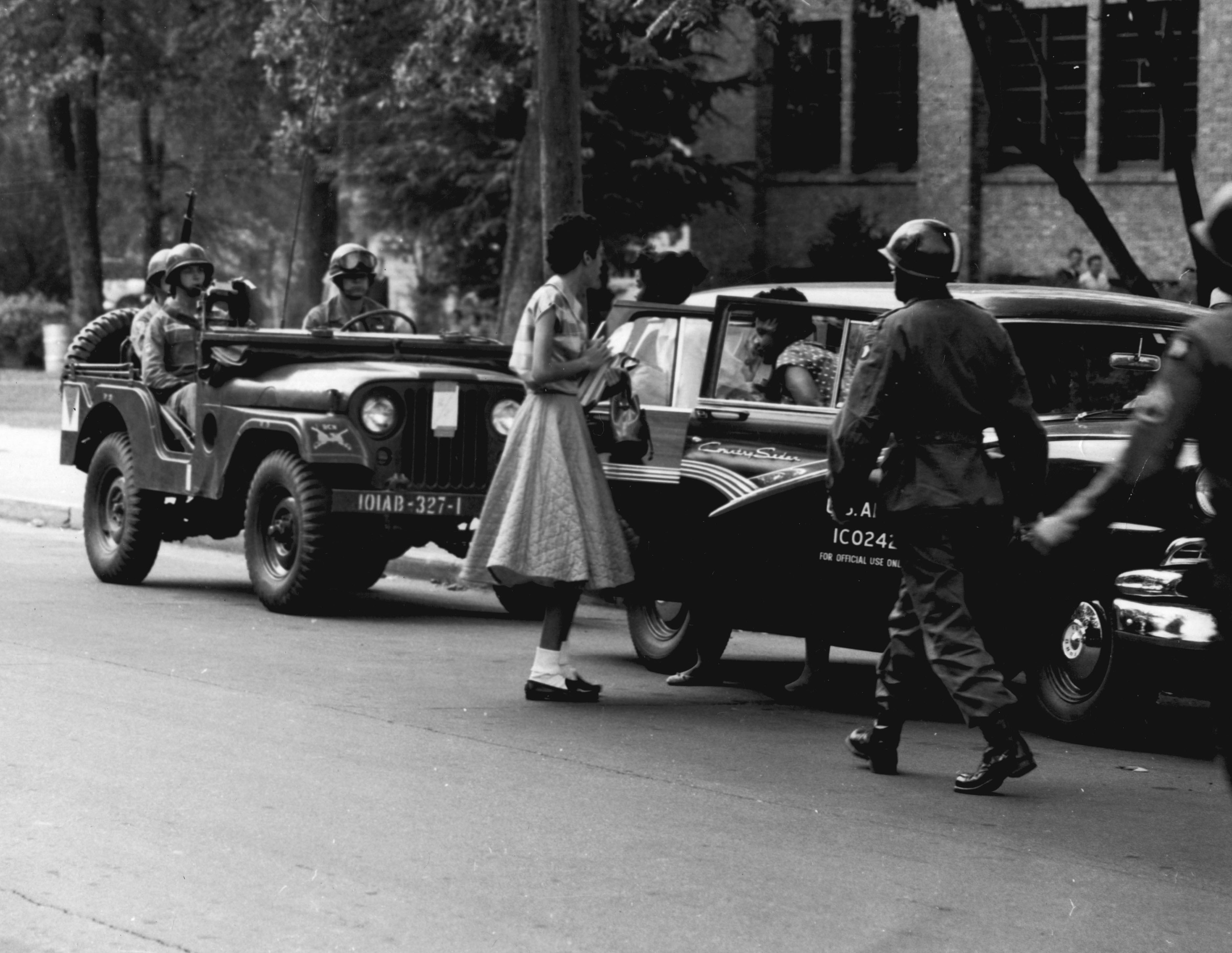
Soldiers from the 101st Airborne Division escort the Little Rock Nine to Central High School in Little Rock in Sept. 1957, after the governor of Arkansas tried to enforce segregation.

A 2012 study determined that "half of all districts ever under court-ordered desegregation [had] been released from court oversight, with most of the releases occurring in the last 20 years". The study found that segregation levels in school districts did not rise sharply following court dismissal, but rather increased gradually for the next 10 to 12 years. As compared to districts that had never been placed under court supervision, districts that had achieved unitary status and were released from court-ordered desegregation had a subsequent change in segregation patterns that was 10 times as great. The study concludes that "court-ordered desegregation plans are effective in reducing racial school segregation, but ... their effects fade over time in the absence of continued court oversight."

In a pair of rulings in 2007 (Parents Involved in Community Schools v. Seattle School District No. 1 and Meredith v. Jefferson County Board of Education), the court's decision limited schools' ability to use race as a consideration in school assignment plans. In both cases, the Court struck down school assignment plans designed to ensure that the racial composition of schools roughly reflected the composition of the district as a whole, saying that the plans were not "narrowly tailored" to achieve the stated goal and that race-neutral alternatives had not been given adequate consideration.

==== School choice ====
While greater school choice may increase integration by drawing students from more diverse areas, expanded choice often has the opposite effect. When studies compare the racial and ethnic composition of charter schools to public schools, researchers generally find that charter schools preserve or intensify racial and economic segregation, and/or facilitate white flight from public schools. Furthermore, studies that compare individual students' demographic characteristics to the schools they are leaving (public schools) and the schools they are switching to (charter schools) generally demonstrate that students "leave more diverse public schools and enroll in less diverse charter schools".

Private schools constitute a second important type of school choice. A 2002 study found that private schools continued to contribute to the persistence of school segregation in the South over the course of the 1990s. Enrollment of whites in private schools increased sharply in the 1970s, remained unchanged in the 1980s, and increased again over the course of the 1990s. Because the changes over the latter two decades was not substantial, however, researcher Sean Reardon concludes that changes in private school enrollment is not a likely contributor to any changes in schools segregation patterns during that time.

In contrast to charter and private schools, magnet schools generally foster racial integration rather than hinder it. Such schools were initially presented as an alternative to unpopular busing policies, and included explicit desegregation goals along with provisions for recruiting and providing transportation for diverse populations. Although today's magnet schools are no longer as explicitly oriented towards integration efforts, they continue to be less racially isolated than other forms of school choice.

== Outcomes ==
=== Education ===
Desegregation in the 1970s and 1980s led to academic gains for black students. As integration increased, the educational attainment of black students increased while that of whites remained largely unchanged. Historically, greater access to schools with higher enrollment of white students reduced high school dropout rates for black students, and reduced the test score gap.

Minority students continue to be concentrated in high-poverty, low-achieving schools, while white students are more likely to attend high-achieving, more affluent schools. Resources such as funds and high-quality teachers attach unequally to schools according to racial and socioeconomic composition. Schools with high proportions of minority enrollment are often characterized by "less experienced and less qualified teachers, high levels of teacher turnover, less successful peer groups and inadequate facilities and learning materials." These schools also tend to have less challenging curricula and fewer offerings of Advanced Placement courses. Additionally, in recent years, schools have become dependent on the internet for doing and submitting homework. As a result, 25% of black teens and 17% of Latino teens cannot complete their homework due to a lack of reliable internet connection, as opposed to only 13% of White teens.

A 2009 study determined that attending school with a high proportion of black students negatively affected black academic achievement, even after controlling for school quality, differences in ability, and family background. The effect of racial composition on white achievement was insignificant. However, a 2006 study found that white students are more inclined to take higher level courses at integrated schools to decrease exposure to minorities while the black-white test score gap still decreases with movement from a segregated city to an integrated city.

The categorization of 'at-risk' youth typically defines learning differences as disabilities based on a standardized, non-inclusive curriculum; the label 'at-risk' inherently follows students of color and low-income students as a generalized academic failure. National academic standardization also extends to federal policies like the No Child Left Behind Act (NCLB), which implemented high-stakes standardized testing across the country in an attempt to address socio-economic disparities in learning outcomes. Schools that were labelled "failures" and faced sanctions under the NCLB Act were typically high poverty schools in segregated districts. Both the standardization of learning outcomes and the implementation of these policies fail to address the structural barriers that created high poverty, highly segregated schools.

=== Social well-being ===
Integration has a small beneficial impact on short-term outcomes for black students, and a beneficial impact on long-term outcomes, such as school attainment. Integrated education is positively related to short-term outcomes such as K–12 school performance, cross-racial friendships, acceptance of cultural differences, and declines in racial fears and prejudice. Short-term and long-term benefits of integration are found for minority and white students alike. Students who attend integrated schools are more likely to live in diverse neighborhoods as adults than those students who attended more segregated schools. Integrated schools also reduce the maintenance of stereotypes and prevent the formation of prejudices in both majority and minority students.

=== Economics ===
Integration is associated with higher educational and occupational attainment across all ethnic groups, better intergroup relations, greater likelihood of living and working in an integrated environment, lower likelihood of involvement with the criminal justice system, espousal of democratic values, and greater civic engagement. On the other hand, a 2014 study highlights that as segregated schooling increases, the socioeconomic inequalities based on race increases. Billings, Deming, and Rockoff demonstrate how a certain school district focused on the allocation of funds redistributed to schools with a high volume of minority students. Majority-minority schools present areas with high percentages of property that correspond to fewer resources and lower academic capability.

A 1994 study found support for the theory that interracial contact in elementary or secondary school positively affects long-term outcomes in a way that can overcome perpetual segregation against black communities. The study reviewed previous research and determined that, as compared to segregated Black people, desegregated Black people are more likely to set higher occupational aspirations, attend desegregated colleges, have desegregated social and professional networks as adults, gain desegregated employment, and work in white-collar and professional jobs in the private sector. In schools with a relatively high average income per students, students are more likely to perform better because they feel safer.

Urban high schools reported significantly greater drop-out rates than their suburban counterparts. Nationwide, high school drop-out rates are centered in a few hundred public schools that are overwhelmingly impoverished, urban, and non-white. The 2000 Census noted that roughly 50% of high school dropouts are employed and earning 35% less than the average national income while college graduates make 131% of the mean national income with 85% employment.

=== Public school teachers ===
Brown v. Board of Education led to a loss of black teachers. This resulted in racial incongruence between teachers and student population. D'Amico et al. (2017) stated that Brown v. Board of Education "mandated the integration of the nation's schoolchildren but said nothing of the teacher labor force, effectively diminishing the demand for black teachers and thus eliminating these community-supported schools and the teachers who staffed them," (p. 29). This elimination has perpetuated itself into our current day school system, with statistics showing the number of black teachers as disproportionate to the student population. Drawing on a study done by Pew Research center in 2021, they analyzed three decades of the National Center for Education Statistics (NCES) survey data, and Pew found that 79% of "U.S. public school teachers identified as non-Hispanic White during the 2017-18 school year. And additionally, "fewer than one-in-ten teachers were either black (7%), Hispanic (9%) or Asian American (2%)". This suggests that public elementary school teachers are significantly less racially and ethnically diverse and not keeping up with the diversity within their student body.

== Proposals ==
Although the Supreme Court's ruling in Parents Involved in Community Schools v. Seattle School District No. 1 limited school districts' ability to take race into account during the school assignment process, the ruling did not prohibit racial considerations altogether. According to the UCLA Civil Rights Project, a school district may consider race when using: "site selection of new schools; drawing attendance zones with general recognition of the racial demographics of neighborhoods; allocating resources for special programs; recruiting students and faculty in a targeted manner; [and] tracking enrollments, performance, and other statistics by race." Districts may use income-based school assignment policies to try to indirectly achieve racial integration, but in practice such policies are not guaranteed to produce even a modest degree of racial integration.

Other researchers argue that, given restrictive court rulings and the increasingly strong relationship between neighborhood and school segregation, integration efforts instead focus on reducing racial segregation in neighborhoods. This could be achieved, in part, by greater enforcement of the Fair Housing Act and removal of low-density zoning laws. Policy could also set aside low-income housing in new communities with a strong school district based on income.

Policy regarding school choice can ensure greater integration by adopting "civil rights policies" for charter schools. These could require charter schools to recruit diverse faculty and students, provide transportation poor students, and have a racial composition that does not differ greatly from that of public schools. Expanding the availability of magnet schools—which were initially created with school desegregation efforts and civil rights policies in mind—could also lead to increased integration, especially in those instances when magnet schools can draw students from separate (and segregated) attendance zones and school districts. Alternatively, states could move towards county- or region-level school districting, allowing students to be drawn from larger and more diverse geographic areas.

Richard Kahlenberg writes, "Racial integration is a very important aim, but if one's goal is boosting academic achievement, what really matters is economic integration." Kahlenberg refers the low overall socioeconomic status of a school is linked to reduced learning, even after controlling for age, race, and socioeconomic status. The socioeconomic composition of a school may lead to lower student achievement through its effect on "school processes", such as academic climate and teachers' expectations. If reforms could equalize these school processes across schools, socioeconomic and racial integration policies might not be necessary to close achievement gaps.

== See also ==
- American Indian boarding schools
- Education segregation in Indiana
- Education segregation in the Mississippi Delta
- Education segregation in the Mississippi Red Clay region
- Education segregation in New Jersey
- Education segregation in Wisconsin
- Racial segregation in the United States
- School integration in the United States
- School segregation in California
- Segregated prom
- Segregation academy
- The Shame of the Nation
- Educational inequality in the United States
