= Canaan (CDP), New Hampshire =

Census-designated place in New Hampshire, United States

Canaan, New Hampshire
- Census-designated place
- Location within New Hampshire Location within the United States
- Coordinates: 43°39′01″N 72°00′57″W
- Country: United States
- State: New Hampshire
- County: Grafton
- Town: Canaan

Area
  - Total: 0.68 sq mi (1.77 km^{2})
  - Land: 0.68 sq mi (1.77 km^{2})
  - Water: 0 sq mi (0.00 km^{2})
- Elevation: 951 ft (290 m)

Population (2020)
  - Total: 442
  - Density: 646.0/sq mi (249.41/km^{2})
- Time zone: UTC-5 (Eastern (EST))
  - Summer (DST): UTC-4 (EDT)
- ZIP code: 03741
- Area code: 603
- FIPS code: 33-08900
- GNIS feature ID: 2629718

Canaan is a census-designated place (CDP) and the main village in the town of Canaan, New Hampshire, United States. The population of the CDP was 442 at the 2020 census, out of 3,794 in the entire town.

== Geography ==
The CDP is in the southeastern part of the town of Canaan, along U.S. Route 4 in the valley of the Indian River, a tributary of the Mascoma River and part of the Connecticut River watershed. US 4 leads southeast 46 miles (74 km) to Concord, the state capital, and west 14 miles (23 km) to Lebanon. New Hampshire Route 118 runs north from Canaan 15 miles (24 km) to New Hampshire Route 25 at West Rumney.

The Canaan CDP is bordered to the south and east by the Indian River, and to the north by Reagan Road, Blain Road, and Canaan Street. The CDP extends to the west, beyond Follansbee Road.

According to the U.S. Census Bureau, the Canaan CDP has a total area of 0.7 square miles (1.8 km^{2}), all of it recorded as land.

== Demographics ==
Historical population
Census	Pop.	Note	%±
2010	524		—
2020	442		−15.6%
U.S. Decennial Census

As of the census of 2010, there were 524 people, 229 households, and 138 families residing in the CDP. There were 248 housing units, of which 19, or 7.7%, were vacant. The racial makeup of the town was 94.1% white, 0.0% African American, 0.2% Native American, 3.1% Asian, 0.0% Pacific Islander, 0.4% some other race, and 2.3% from two or more races. 1.5% of the population were Hispanic or Latino of any race.

Of the 229 households in the CDP, 27.5% had children under the age of 18 living with them, 41.5% were headed by married couples living together, 13.5% had a female householder with no husband present, and 39.7% were non-families. 30.6% of all households were made up of individuals, and 16.2% were someone living alone who was 65 years of age or older. The average household size was 2.29, and the average family size was 2.81.

20.6% of people in the CDP were under the age of 18, 9.4% were from age 18 to 24, 25.3% were from 25 to 44, 28.1% were from 45 to 64, and 16.8% were 65 years of age or older. The median age was 41.4 years. For every 100 females, there were 98.5 males. For every 100 females age 18 and over, there were 94.4 males.

For the period 2011–15, the estimated median annual income for a household was $46,250, and the median income for a family was $70,391. The per capita income for the CDP was $23,302. 19.0% of the population and 30.2% of families were below the poverty line.
