= Canaan Meetinghouse =

Historic church in New Hampshire, United States

- Canaaan Meetinghouse
- U.S. National Register of Historic Places
- U.S. Historic district – Contributing property
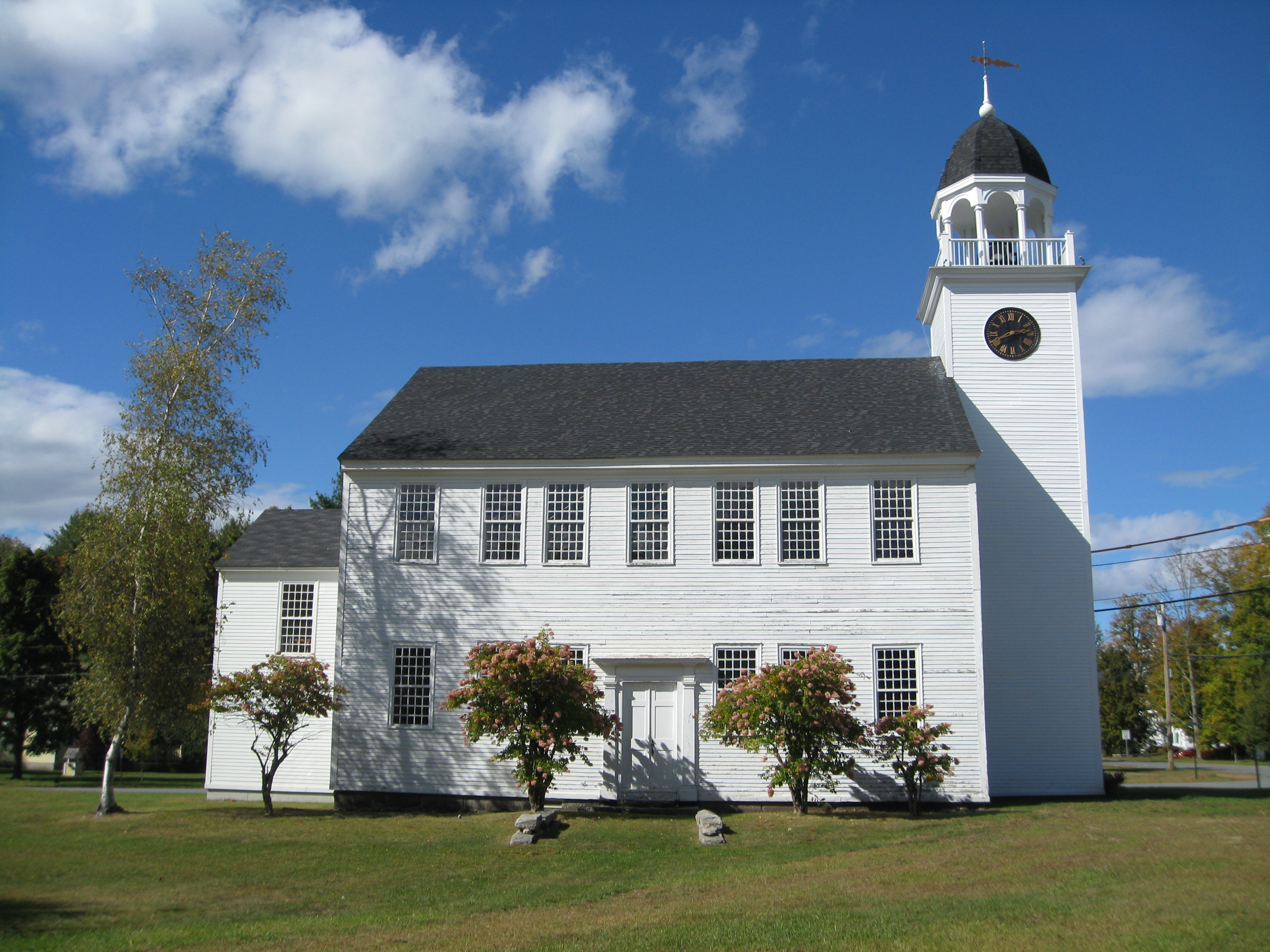

- Location within New Hampshire Location within the United States
- Location: Canaan St., Canaan, New Hampshire
- Coordinates: 43°39′55″N 72°2′34″W
- Area: less than one acre
- Built: 1794
- Architect: Parkhurst, William
- Architectural style: Federal
- Part of: Canaan Street Historic District (ID73000163)
- NRHP reference No.: 72001598

Significant dates
- Added to NRHP: March 24, 1972
- Designated CP: May 7, 1973

The Canaan Meetinghouse is a historic meeting house on Canaan Street in Canaan, New Hampshire. Built in 1794, with some subsequent alterations, it is a good example of a Federal period meeting house, serving as a center of town civic and religious activity for many years. The building was listed on the National Register of Historic Places in 1972, and included in the Canaan Street Historic District the following year. The building is still owned by the town, and is available for rent.

== Description and history ==
The Canaan Meetinghouse is located at the southwest corner of Canaan Street and Apple Blossom Road, overlooking Canaan Street Lake to the east. It is a 2½-story wood-frame structure, with a gabled roof and clapboarded exterior. A square tower projects from the short front side, rising 53 feet (16 m) to a clock stage and open octagonal belfry. The current main entrance is at the base of the tower, framed by pilasters and a corniced entablature; the original main entrance is located at the center of the long south side, with a slightly simpler surround. The interior is outfitted with bench pews, a replacement for the original box pews, and the gallery level has been covered over to provide a full second story.

The Federal-style building was constructed for use as a church in the mid-1790s. It was also used for town meetings from an early date, and was purchased by the town in 1829, at which time it was reoriented to have the entrance on the short end. Originally built with projecting stairwells on the short sides, one of the stairwells was mounted on top of the other to create the tower after the town bought the building. In 1841 the upper gallery was converted to a full second floor, intended for use as a church space by the local Baptist congregation.

== See also ==
- National Register of Historic Places listings in Grafton County, New Hampshire
