= Canaan Union Academy =

Former segregated school in Canaan, New Hampshire

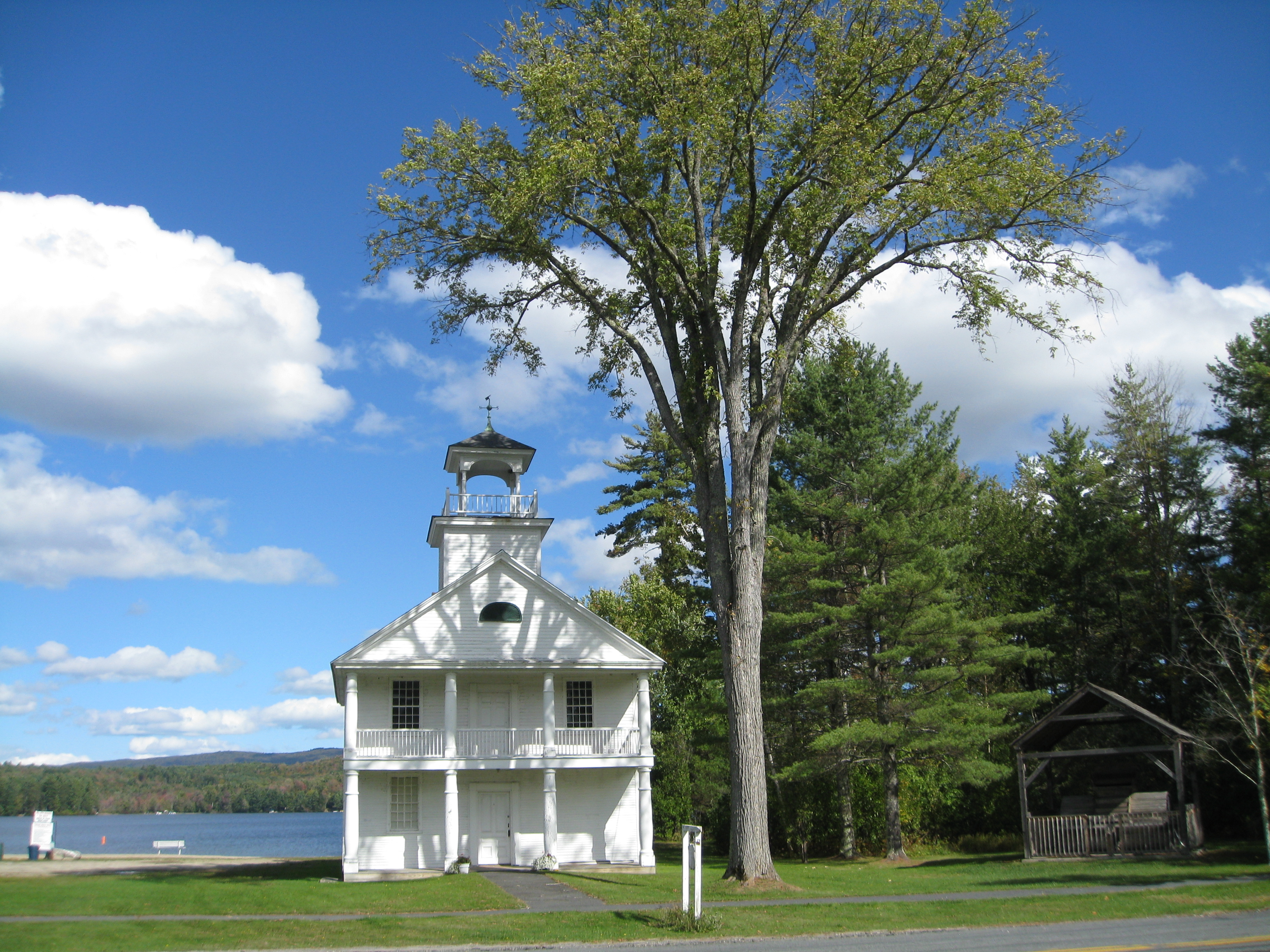

Canaan Union Academy was a whites-only school established in 1839 in Canaan, NH, after a mob of segregationists and anti-abolitionists destroyed the integrated Noyes Academy in 1835. After about twenty years as a school, the building was abandoned until at least 1886, falling into disrepair. Canaan Union Academy was eventually reestablished, and continued in operation until 1892.

In 1903, the residents of the Town of Canaan voted to spend $100 (equivalent to $3,600 in 2025) to convert the Academy building into a library. The building was the location for the Canaan Town Library from 1904 until 1978. The Canaan Historical Museum began sharing the building with the library in 1961. When the library moved to the larger Canaan Community Building in 1978, the Canaan Historical Society and Museum took sole responsibility for the Academy building.

The building features a two-story porch and open belfry topped by a low pyramidal roof. It is part of the Canaan Street Historic District.
