= Mascoma Valley Regional High School =

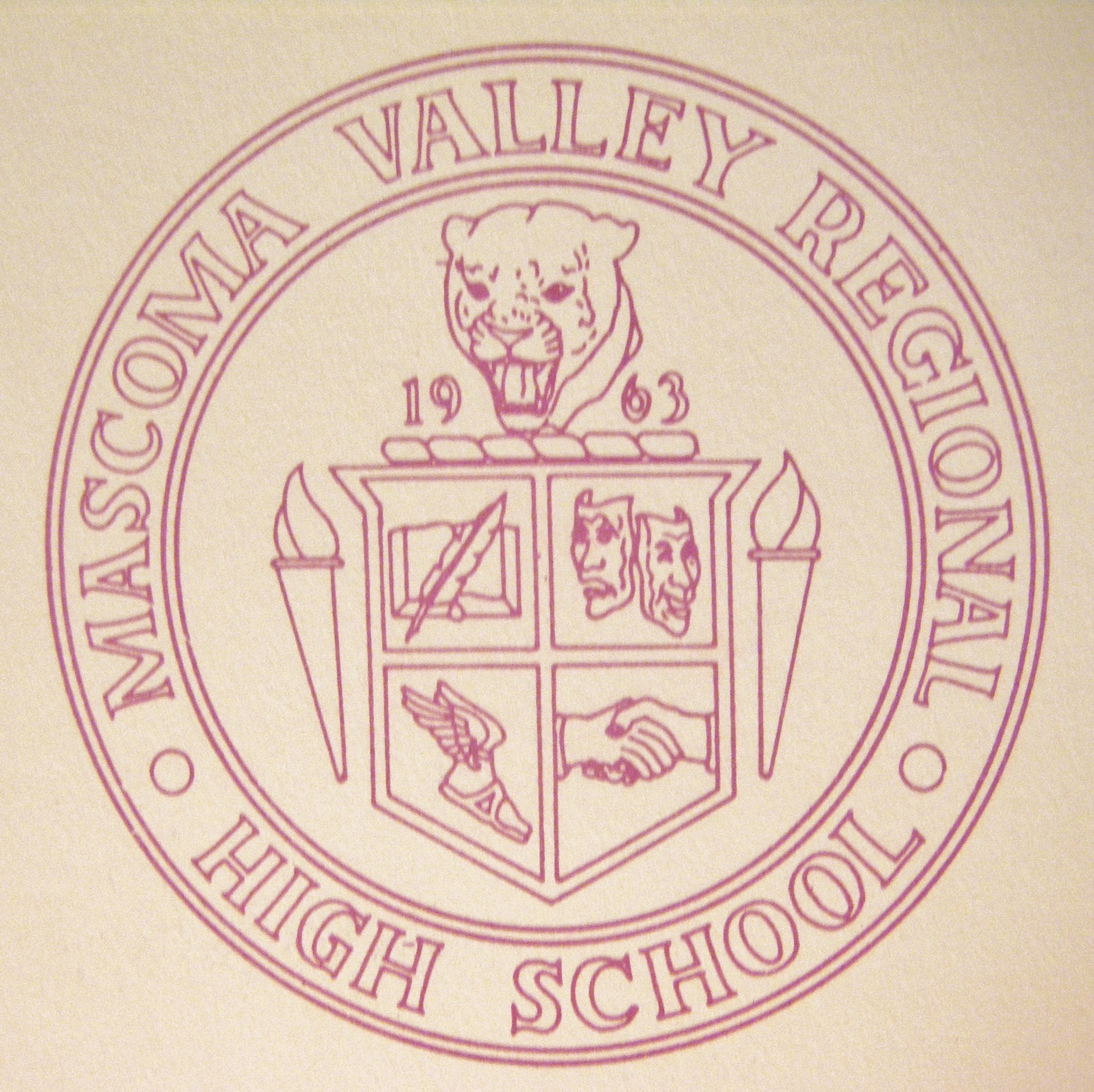

Location
- 27 Royal Road; Canaan, New Hampshire 03741; United States
- Coordinates: 43°39′00″N 72°05′56″W

Information
- School type: Public High School
- Motto: "You can't hide that Panther pride!"
- Founded: 1963
- School district: Mascoma Valley Regional School District
- Superintendent: Amanda Isabelle
- CEEB code: 300608
- Principal: Tina Fleming
- Teaching staff: 28.50 (FTE)
- Grades: 9–12
- Enrollment: 336 (2023-2024)
- Student to teacher ratio: 11.79
- Language: English
- Colors: Purple and Gold
- Athletics conference: NHIAA; Division III
- Mascot: Royal Panthers
- Rivals: Franklin High School; Newfound Regional High School
- Accreditation: NEASC
- Communities served: Canaan, Dorchester, Enfield, Grafton, and Orange, NH
- Feeder schools: Indian River Middle School
- Website: Official Site
- Last updated: July 12, 2019

Mascoma Valley Regional High School (MVRHS) is a public secondary school in Canaan, New Hampshire. Surrounding towns that attend MVRHS are Grafton, Enfield, Orange, and Dorchester. The facility, opened in 1963, is located on Royal Road, off of U.S. Route 4. It is adjacent to the Indian River School, which houses grades five through eight. The school colors are Purple and Gold; the mascot is a panther and teams are known as “The Royals.”

On March 11, 2014, district voters approved a $21.5 million renovation. The plan, which includes improved parking and access, efficiency upgrades, a new auditorium, library, band room, art room, expanded laboratories, and certain life safety upgrades (a sprinkler system), garnered nearly 63% of the vote (60% was necessary for the bond to pass). Previous attempts to either construct an entirely new high school or to renovate the existing structure had failed, including 2013's attempt which failed with 59+% of the vote.

Renovations to the existing building commenced in 2015 and were completed over the summer in 2016. The school opened the new addition on September 6, 2016.

== School district ==
The school is a part of the Mascoma Valley Regional School District, SAU 62, which includes MVRHS, Indian River School, Enfield Village School, and Canaan Elementary School. All schools are governed by a seven-member school board, elected at large by the voters in the member communities and providing proportional representation for those communities in the financing and governing of the high school.

== Student activities ==
Student activities at Mascoma include National Honor Society, Student Council, Destination Imagination, Granite State Challenge, Life Smarts, Interact Club, Math Team, Future Business Leaders of America, Mascoma Outing Club, Snowmobile Club, Book Club, Drama, Concert Band, Chorus, Jazz Band, Guitar Ensemble, French and Spanish Clubs, and many athletics teams.

=== Mascoma Outing Club ===
MVRHS offers an outing club to its students in an effort to expose teenagers to the New Hampshire outdoors. Inspired by nearby Dartmouth College's outing club, the MOC offers annual trips and events whereupon students can gain leadership skills and confidence trekking through the region's many outdoor resources. Annual trips include the Leaf-Peakers hike, the Jell-o-Thon, trick-or-treating by boat, Saturday morning bike rides, the polar dip, and the Deep Freeze Overnight. With a motto of "Play Outdoors...Risk Free," the MOC strives to introduce students to their otherwise seemingly inaccessible backyard.

=== Destination Imagination ===
The Destination Imagination teams have earned state and global awards for overall excellence. In the past ten years, the Mascoma Destination Imagination teams have competed at the global level seven times. In 2007, the Senior team placed 4th in the entire world, and 5th place in the entire world in 2015.

=== Athletics ===
Mascoma has a comprehensive athletics program at the Division III level, with players competing on varsity and junior varsity teams in baseball, basketball, field hockey, football, soccer, softball, track, volleyball, wrestling, cross country running and the newly created "Spirit Squad" cheerleading. The girls basketball team holds more state titles than any other Division III girls basketball team in New Hampshire. In 2012 the boys football team were state runners-up. In 2018 the varsity field hockey team won the NHIAA Division III championship for the first time since 1983. Girls field hockey were state runners up in 2017 and state champions in 2018.

Mascoma sports fans are famous for their enthusiasm and exceptional school spirit, earning the name of "Rowdy Royals".

=== Concert Band ===
The Mascoma Concert Band has grown to large numbers in recent years, now consisting of approximately 40 members. The band has been on numerous trips to showcase and further develop their abilities. In 2008 they performed at the presidential inauguration in Washington DC. They traveled to Williamsburg, Virginia in 2014 to compete in the Heritage Music Festival. The Band, Guitar Ensemble, and Chorus brought back the first-place trophy. In 2011, they traveled down to Orlando, Florida to the Heritage Music Festival once more. The Band won silver first, the Guitar Ensemble won gold first, and the Chorus won gold second. They also brought back the biggest trophy the festival had for the second time, and are planning on doing the same within the next few years.

=== MVRHS Radio ===
In the beginning of the 2016–2017 school year a student run radio station was built in conjunction with the music department. The station is run solely by students with a staff of 15 total students. The station officially launched September 6, 2016, at 11:00 am. The station is known for its classic hits music format and is also known for carrying sports programming for Mascoma sports. The station streams online and is called X101 - Mascoma High School Radio. This station is not currently running.

=== National Honor Society ===
The Mascoma chapter of the National Honor Society consists of juniors and seniors who not only achieve high academic marks but also serve in their community and are responsible and helpful. They are then inducted by a faculty member who selects them and speaks on that student's behalf. This traditional selection process is kept a secret until the induction night.
