= Crystal Lake (Enfield, New Hampshire) =

Lake in Grafton County, New Hampshire

- Location in New Hampshire Location in the United States
- Location: Grafton County, New Hampshire
- Coordinates: 43°36′02″N 72°05′20″W
- Primary inflows: Bicknell Brook
- Primary outflows: Crystal Lake Brook
- Basin countries: United States
- Max. length: 1.6 mi (2.6 km)
- Max. width: 0.7 mi (1.1 km)
- Surface area: 401 acres (1.6 km^{2})
- Surface elevation: 890 ft (271 m)
- Islands: 1
- Settlements: Enfield

Crystal Lake is a 401-acre (1.6 km^{2}) water body located in Grafton County in western New Hampshire, United States, in the town of Enfield. Crystal Lake is part of the Mascoma River watershed.

The lake contains one small island: Oliver Island.

The lake is classified as a cold- and warmwater fishery, with observed species including rainbow trout, smallmouth bass, chain pickerel, horned pout, black crappie, and rock bass.

The lake is one of eight in New Hampshire which historically had a naturally occurring native lake trout population. These fish have since been extirpated from the lake.

== See also ==
- List of lakes in New Hampshire
