= Franklin High School (New Hampshire) =

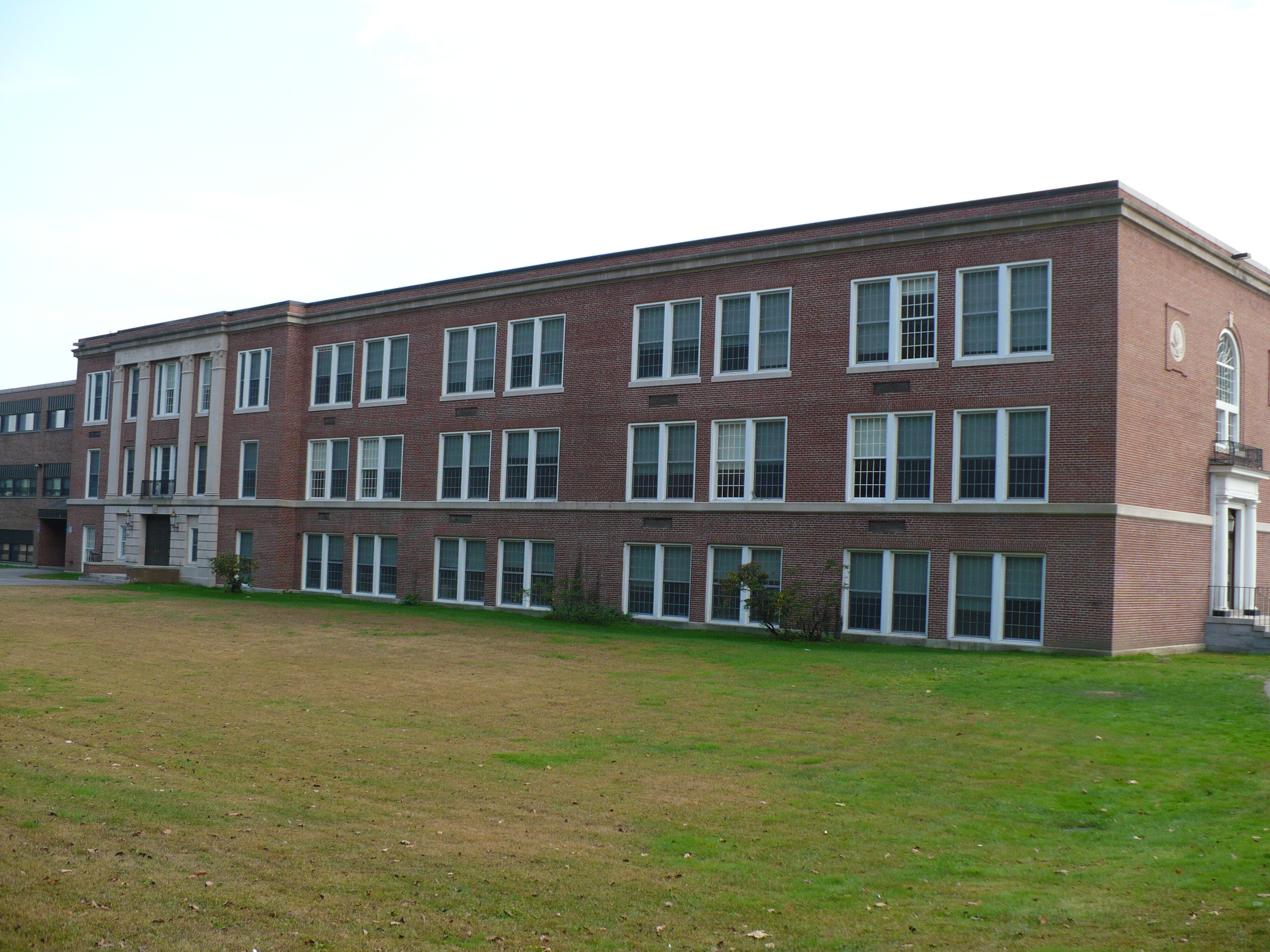

Location
- 119 Central Street; Franklin, New Hampshire; United States
- Coordinates: 43°26′27″N 71°39′14″W

Information
- Type: Public
- Principal: David Levesque
- Teaching staff: 17.00 (FTE)
- Grades: High school (9-12)
- Enrollment: 277 (2023–2024)
- Student to teacher ratio: 16.29
- Color(s): Blue and gold
- Nickname: Golden Tornadoes
- Rival: Bishop Brady High; Winnisquam Regional High
- Website: www.sau18.org

Franklin High School is located in Franklin, New Hampshire, United States.

Franklin is known in the area for its football, softball and baseball teams. Their main sports rival is Winnisquam Regional High School in the neighboring town of Tilton.

== Athletics ==
Fall

- Volleyball (F)
- Field hockey (F)
- Football (M)
- Soccer (M/F)
- Cheering (F)

Winter

- Basketball (M/F)

Spring

- Baseball
- Softball
- Track and field (M/F)

Football, softball, and baseball are the school's best sports programs, each playing in championship games in the past five years. The football team won the state championship against Mascoma in 2012, marking the second state championship win in four years and their fourth appearance in six years. The football and the softball teams both won the championship game in 2008. The school's cheer team has won national honors within the past five years. Franklin High School is known for their widely respected wrestling program.

Dan Sylvester is the director of athletics.
