= Canaan Motor Club =

American race track

Coordinates: 43°38′59″N 72°0′1″W

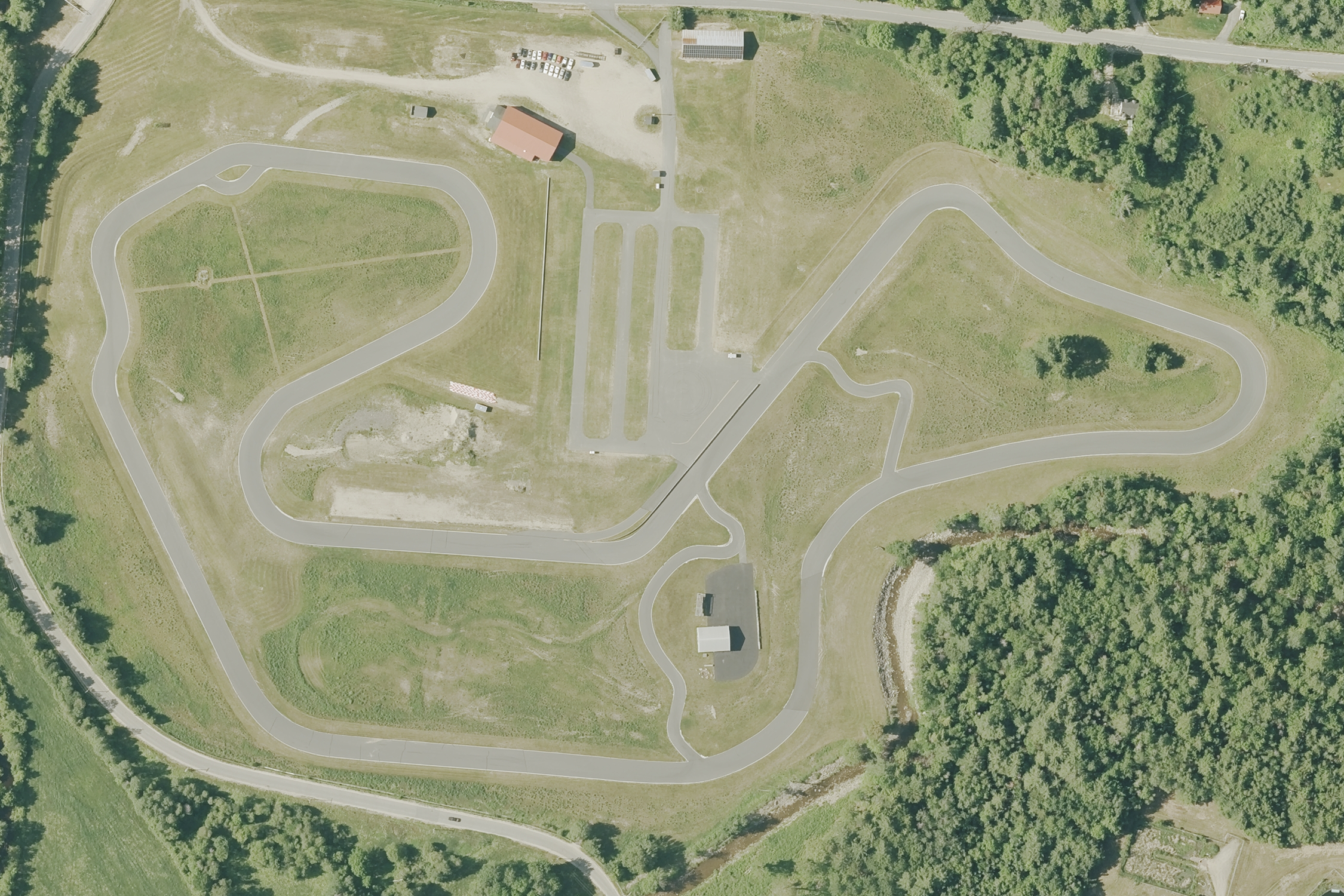
2023 aerial photo

The Canaan Motor Club (CMC) is a race track in Canaan, New Hampshire, in the United States. The CMC is a 1.3-mile-long (2.1 km) technically challenging road course with extensive runoff areas to promote a safe environment for all track users. The track may be run in both directions to give a total of 2.6 miles (4.2 km) with nine major turns. The track may be configured to run two separate events at the same time.
