= George Kimball (attorney) =

American lawyer

George Kimball (1787–1858) was an attorney and abolitionist in Canaan, New Hampshire. He helped found and support the establishment of the Noyes School, an integrated school that attracted African American students ("colored youth") from around the U.S. as well as local white students. He boarded some of the African American students attending the school until anti-abolitionists and segregationists organized a mob that destroyed the school. The University of New Hampshire has a collection with 18 of his correspondence with abolitionists.
