= Goose Pond (New Hampshire) =

Lake in New Hampshire, United States

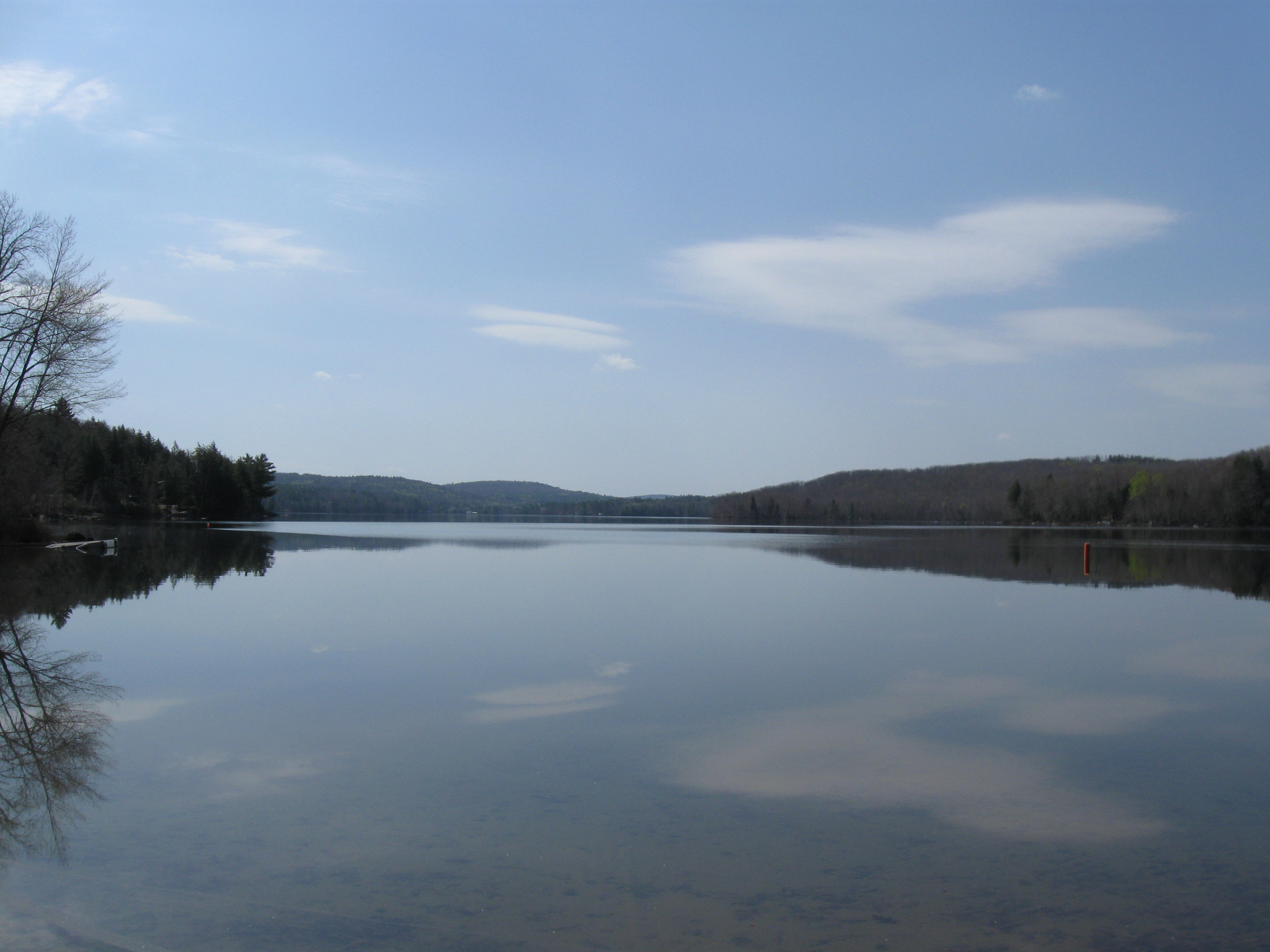

- Location within New Hampshire Location within the United States
- Location: Grafton County, New Hampshire
- Coordinates: 43°42′9″N 72°5′38″W
- Primary inflows: Pressey Brook; Marshall Brook
- Primary outflows: Goose Pond Brook
- Basin countries: United States
- Max. length: 2.9 mi (4.7 km)
- Max. width: 0.6 mi (0.97 km)
- Surface area: 625 acres (2.5 km^{2})
- Average depth: 10 ft (3.0 m)
- Max. depth: 35 ft (11 m)
- Surface elevation: 823 ft (251 m)
- Settlements: Canaan; Hanover

Goose Pond is a 625-acre (2.5 km^{2}) water body located in Grafton County in western New Hampshire, United States, in the towns of Canaan and Hanover. It is considered a great pond by the state of New Hampshire. The lake has 6.3 miles (10.1 km) of shoreline, and is approximately 3 miles (5 km) long by 0.5 miles (0.8 km) wide. All but the northernmost end of the pond is in the town of Canaan. The average depth of the pond is approximately 10 feet (3.0 m), with the deepest part approximately 35 feet (11 m). The lake is part of the Mascoma River watershed, flowing to the Connecticut River.

There is evidence of Goose Pond in the late 1700s. According to legend, George Harris and his party in 1767 came upon a sheet of water near Hanover, whose surface seemed to be alive with wild geese and ducks. They killed a goose - an old one - and cooked it all day, and then it was tough. It never got to be a tender goose, and to commemorate this circumstance they named that water "Goose Pond".

A small wooden dam was built in 1899 which probably increased the size of the pond. The present dam was built in 1917-18 and was repaired in 1952 and 1990. It has served as an energy reserve for the Lebanon mills, and for hydroelectric plants. New Hampshire Water Resources currently holds the rights, and still sells waterpower once a year in a draw-down, generating funds to maintain the dam. The pond continues to serve as an important recreational, scenic, and ecological resource in the Mascoma River watershed.

There are two islands on the pond, known as "The Big Island" and "The Little Island", and there is one public boat launch area, known as "The Acre", owned by the state. At the Acre there is a small public beach, and another near the dam at the southern tip of the pond. There is no overnight camping and fires are not allowed at the Acre, the dam area, or on the Little or the Big Island. Fires are allowed on private property with a free permit from the fire warden.

There are 160 cottages or homes directly on or across the road from the pond, with over 30 that are used by year-round residents. The shoreline is primarily owned by the state, with a few privately owned shores.

A variety of wildlife are seen (and heard) near the pond throughout the year, including moose, bear, deer, wild turkeys, fox, and coyote. Otters, beavers and minks are often seen near the shoreline, and turtles can often be spotted in the pond. The bird population is diverse, including osprey, eagles, great blue herons, plovers, kingfishers, Canada geese, a variety of ducks, and loons.

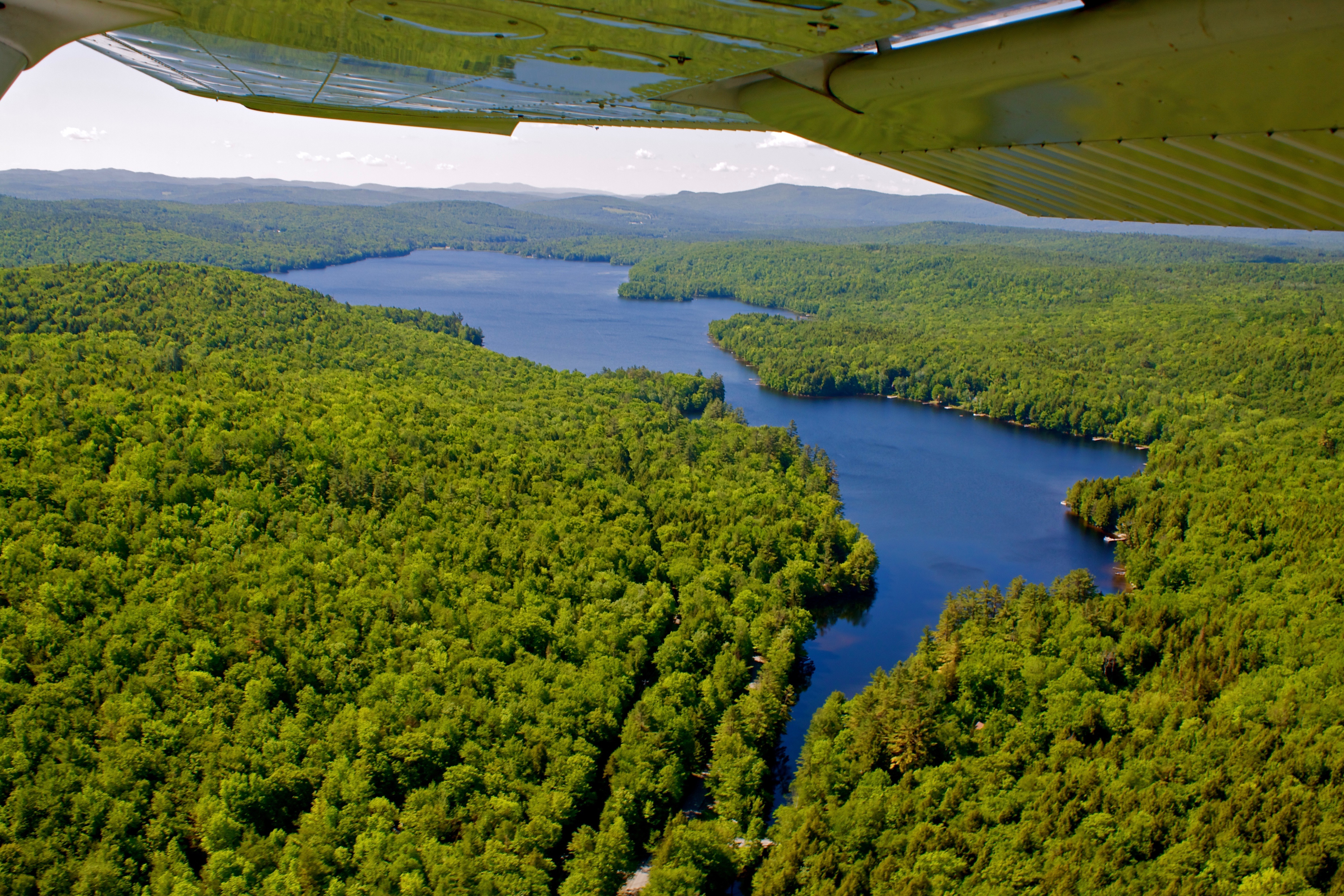
Aerial view of Goose Pond

The lake is classified as a warm water fishery, with observed species including smallmouth bass, largemouth bass, chain pickerel, horned pout, and white perch. The state record smallmouth bass (7 lbs. 14.5 oz.) for New Hampshire was caught in this lake in August 1970 by Francis H. Loud.

== See also ==
- List of lakes in New Hampshire
