= Noyes Academy =

Racially integrated school in New Hampshire, est. 1835

Coordinates: 43.656°N 72.017°W

The Noyes Academy was a racially integrated school, which also admitted women, founded by New England abolitionists in 1835 in Canaan, New Hampshire, near Dartmouth College, whose then-abolitionist president, Nathan Lord, was "the only seated New England college president willing to admit black students to his college".

The school was unpopular with many local residents who opposed having blacks in the town. After some months, several hundred white men of Canaan and neighboring towns demolished the academy. They replaced it with Canaan Union Academy, restricted to whites.

== Background ==
In the background of the Noyes Academy's foundation is the unsuccessful attempt, in 1831, to found a college for African Americans in New Haven, Connecticut. The citizens of that city "vociferously condemned the Black College proposal. The intensity of passion that exploded over the college meant the idea was stillborn." (See Simeon Jocelyn and New Haven Excitement). A direct result was the formation of the New England Anti-Slavery Society.

"A more modest, and some thought wiser, course of action" was working to get black students admitted to existing academies and colleges. "The idea gradually evolved that, in the short run, what was needed was an integrated preparatory school" to prepare blacks for college or seminary.

== Founding ==
Noyes Academy was begun by New England men sympathetic to the abolitionist movement, including Samuel Noyes (1754–1845), uncle of John Humphrey Noyes who founded the Oneida Community, attorney George Kimball of Canaan, and Samuel Edmund Sewall of Boston.

Demand was growing for educational facilities open to African Americans at a time when public education was expanding, as many schools were segregated. Kimball noted:

It is unhappily true, that the colored portion of our fellow citizens, even in the free States, while their toil and blood have contributed to establish, and their taxes equally with those of whites to maintain our free system of Education, have practically been excluded from the benefits of it. This institution proposes to restore, so far as it can, to this neglected and injured class, the privileres of literary, moral and religious instruction. We propose to uncover a fountain of pure and healthful learning, holding towards all the language of the Book of Life [Isaiah 55.1]: " Ho! EVERY ONE that thirsteth, let him come and drink."

The plan for the school received the approbation of the New Hampshire Anti-Slavery Society at its first meeting.

Resolved, We regard with approbation the plan of establishing schools that will not, either by form of law or of prejudice oftentimes stronger than law, exclude colored youth from a participation in their benefits; and the proposed Academy in Canaan in this state, with reference to the principle, meets our views, and is recommended to the countenance and support of the friends of the people of color.

Trustees and donors to the school agreed to have an interracial student body, announcing it in the February 28, 1835 issue of The Liberator. "Youths will be fitted for admission into any of the Colleges and Universities of the United States; but it is intended that this Seminary shall itself afford means of such correct and extensive classical attainments, as shall qualify young men to commence the study of the learned professions." This announcement also said that a teacher, William Scales, a senior at the Andover Theological Seminary, was hired, and gave a long list of subjects to be taught. Another teacher, Mary Harris, was hired for the "female department", but the school was destroyed before she could begin.

== Opening of the school ==
The school, in a "neat and handsome edifice", opened in March 1835, with 28 white and 17 African-American students. The white students were generally from local families, but many of the black students had traveled from as far as Philadelphia to attend the academy, because of limited educational opportunities elsewhere. They were described as having a "modest and becoming deportment" and "inoffensive, polite and unassuming manners". They often had to travel in poor conditions on segregated steamboats and stagecoaches, and while on the boats were barred from the cabin and forced to remain on deck whatever the weather. On a journey of 200 miles (320 km), "rarely could they get food and nowhere could they find lodging."

Several future prominent African-American abolitionists, such as Henry Highland Garnet, Thomas Paul, Jr., Thomas S. Sydney, Julia Williams, Charles L. Reason, and Alexander Crummell attended the school during the several months that it was open. Williams, who would later marry Garnet, had been a student at Prudence Crandall's Canterbury Female Boarding School for "young Ladies and little Misses of color", which was also destroyed by a mob in 1834 after being open only a short time. Garnet and some other students boarded with Kimball.

== Destruction ==
Many local residents objected to allowing blacks into the town to attend the academy, which they called a "nuisance" in a town meeting. There was an "oportune visit of some slavers from the South". Segregationists launched a campaign to discredit school officials and cultivate hysteria over the possibility of interracial marriage and racial mixing." According to them, "[t]he village was to be overrun with negroes from the South — the slaves were to be brought on to line the streets with huts and to inundate the industrious town with paupers and vagabonds — and other tales too indecent and too ridiculous to be repeated". On July 31, 1835, the town voted "for the removal of the Noyes Academy, at which black and white children are promiscuously received. A committee was appointed to carry the vote into execution."

The Superintending Committee appointed by said town proceeded at 7 AM [August 10] to discharge their duty; the performance of which they believe the interest of the town, the honor of the State, and the good of the whole community (both black and white) required without delay.

At an early hour, the people of this town and of the neighboring towns assembled, full of the spirit of '75 [sic], to the number of about three hundred, with between ninety and one hundred yoke of oxen, and with all necessary materials for the completion of the undertaking. Many of the most respectable and wealthy farmers of this and the adjacent towns rendered their assistance on this occasion....

The work was commenced and carried on with very little noise, considering the number engaged, until the building was safely landed on the common near the Baptist meeting-house, where it stands, ...the monument of the folly of those living spirits, who are struggling to destroy what our fathers have gained.

The building was "shattered, mutilated, inwardly beyond reparation almost." It was later destroyed by arson.

Kimball helped the black students leave at night for their safety. He shortly followed them, moving to Alton, Illinois, located on the Mississippi River. It became a center for abolitionist activity in the Midwest (see Elijah Parish Lovejoy). Four students — Alexander Crummell, Henry Highland Garnet, Thomas Sydney, and Julia Williams — enrolled in the Oneida Institute, in Whitesboro, New York, a hotbed of abolitionism, the most abolitionist college in the country and the first to admit blacks and whites on equal terms. Thomas Paul, Jr., was one of the first black graduates of Dartmouth College (class of 1841); he later taught at the Abiel Smith School, a school for blacks in Boston.

The Noyes Academy affair "created much excitement against the abolitionists, and if the account in the Statesman is to be relied upon, was the means of securing the election to the Legislature of a man as hostile to the anti-slavery cause as McDuffie [Governor of South Carolina] himself could desire."

Canaan Union Academy, restricted to whites, was built in 1839 and operated on the Noyes site until about 1859, and again from 1888 until 1892. The building currently houses the Canaan Historical Society and Museum.

== Historical marker ==
A state historical marker at the school's site reads:

Noyes Academy

Charted in 1834 by Samuel Noyes and other Canaan citizens, it was the first-known, upper-level co-ed school in the US open to African Americans. The school opened in 1835, but months later, outraged opponents used a team of oxen to drag the Academy building down Canaan Street and forced the Black pupils out of town. This brief experiment in educational equality helped launch the public careers of Black leaders Henry Highland Garnet, Alexander Crummell, and Thomas Sipkins Sydney. Garnet was the first African American to preach in Congress (1865).

2015

== See also ==
- Canterbury Female Boarding School
- Institute for Colored Youth
- David Daggett
- Scotia Seminary
