= Education segregation in Wisconsin =

Wisconsin has some of the most segregated schools in the United States. Despite laws demanding school integration, a 2012 study by the UCLA Civil Rights Project found that Wisconsin still has significant segregation in its classrooms.

Almost half of black students in Wisconsin attend a school where 90% or more of the students are non-white.

== Background ==
Wisconsin became a state in 1848. Plessy v. Ferguson (1896) legitimized separate but equal as national policy.

After Brown v. Board of Education, the state still needed a legal push. Amos, et al. v. Board of School Directors of the City of Milwaukee (1965) was the beginning in Wisconsin.

National policy came in 1971 in Swann v. Charlotte-Mecklenburg Board of Education which relied on the Civil Rights Act of 1964. The federal answer was court-ordered busing. Meanwhile, Amos was appealed in 1976, and ended up in the United States Supreme Court as Brennan v. Armstrong (1977). The decision of the circuit court of appeals was remanded back to the original court. Finally, United States District Judge John W. Reynolds Jr. oversaw a five-year plan for the Milwaukee school Board to desegregate the schools. In Wisconsin, busing began in 1981.

== Demographics ==
Citizens of Wisconsin describe themselves as being more white than the rest of the country. In the 2010 Census, 86.2% reported being white, compared with 73.8 for the nation as a whole.

Wisconsin had never been a slave state. The 1860 Census reported a state population of 775,881. Of those, 1,711 were colored, all free. By 1900, that number had grown only to 2,500. The black population of Wisconsin grew substantially in the 20th century to 6% today.

== School demographics ==
The demographics of schools in Wisconsin reflect the composition of the communities in which they are located. Today, 71% of the state's black population lives in Milwaukee County, where they make up 41% of the population. As a result, the numbers for the rest of the state are skewed by schools in Milwaukee whose percentage is black population is far higher than the rest of the state.

== Studies ==
Since 1996, the relative segregation of classrooms across the United States has been studied by the Civil Rights Project at Harvard until 2007 and subsequently at the Graduate School of Education and Information Studies at UCLA.

A 2016 UCLA study showed that 45.3% of black students in Wisconsin attend a school that is 90% or more non-white. Only six states had a higher percentage.

== School vouchers ==
School vouchers were introduced in Milwaukee in 1990. Indiana has one of the largest school voucher programs in the United States. Critics contend that vouchers contribute to school segregation. Analysis of two recent studies on vouchers show that, in one case they do contribute to more segregation, and in the second, they have little effect, with black recipients who had been in a majority-black public school using the vouchers to attend a majority-black private school.
