= Canaan Street Lake =

Lake in Grafton County, New Hampshire

- Location within New Hampshire Location within the United States
- Location: Grafton County, New Hampshire
- Coordinates: 43°40′0″N 72°02′09″W
- Primary outflows: tributary of Mascoma River
- Basin countries: United States
- Max. length: 1.3 mi (2.1 km)
- Max. width: 0.8 mi (1.3 km)
- Surface area: 291 acres (118 ha)
- Average depth: 10 ft (3.0 m)
- Max. depth: 20 ft (6.1 m)
- Surface elevation: 1,145 ft (349 m)
- Settlements: Canaan

Canaan Street Lake is a 291-acre (118 ha) water body located in Grafton County in western New Hampshire, United States, in the town of Canaan. It is part of the Mascoma River watershed, a tributary of the Connecticut River.

A peninsula on the north side of the lake is occupied by the Cardigan Mountain School. The west side of the lake is bordered by the Canaan Street Historic District.

== See also ==
- List of lakes in New Hampshire
