= Indian River (New Hampshire) =

- Location within New Hampshire Location within the United States

Location
- Country: United States
- State: New Hampshire
- County: Grafton
- Towns: Dorchester, Canaan

Physical characteristics
- Source
  - location: Dorchester
  - coordinates: 43°44′45″N 71°59′44″W
  - elevation: 1,800 ft (550 m)
- Mouth: Mascoma River
  - location: Canaan
  - coordinates: 43°38′54″N 72°3′45″W
  - elevation: 856 ft (261 m)
- Length: 12.8 mi (20.6 km)

Basin features
- Tributaries
  - left: Orange Brook, Gulf Brook, Moose Brook

The Indian River is a 12.8-mile-long (20.6 km) river in western New Hampshire in the United States. It is a tributary of the Mascoma River, which in turn flows to the Connecticut River and ultimately Long Island Sound.

The Indian River rises in the southern corner of the town of Dorchester and flows south in a broad valley to the west of Mount Cardigan. At the town center of Canaan, the river turns west and shortly ends at the Mascoma River.

For its south-flowing portion, the Indian River is followed by New Hampshire Route 118. From Canaan to the Mascoma River, U.S. Route 4 is close by.

== See also ==
- List of rivers of New Hampshire
