= Dorchester, New Hampshire =

- Town
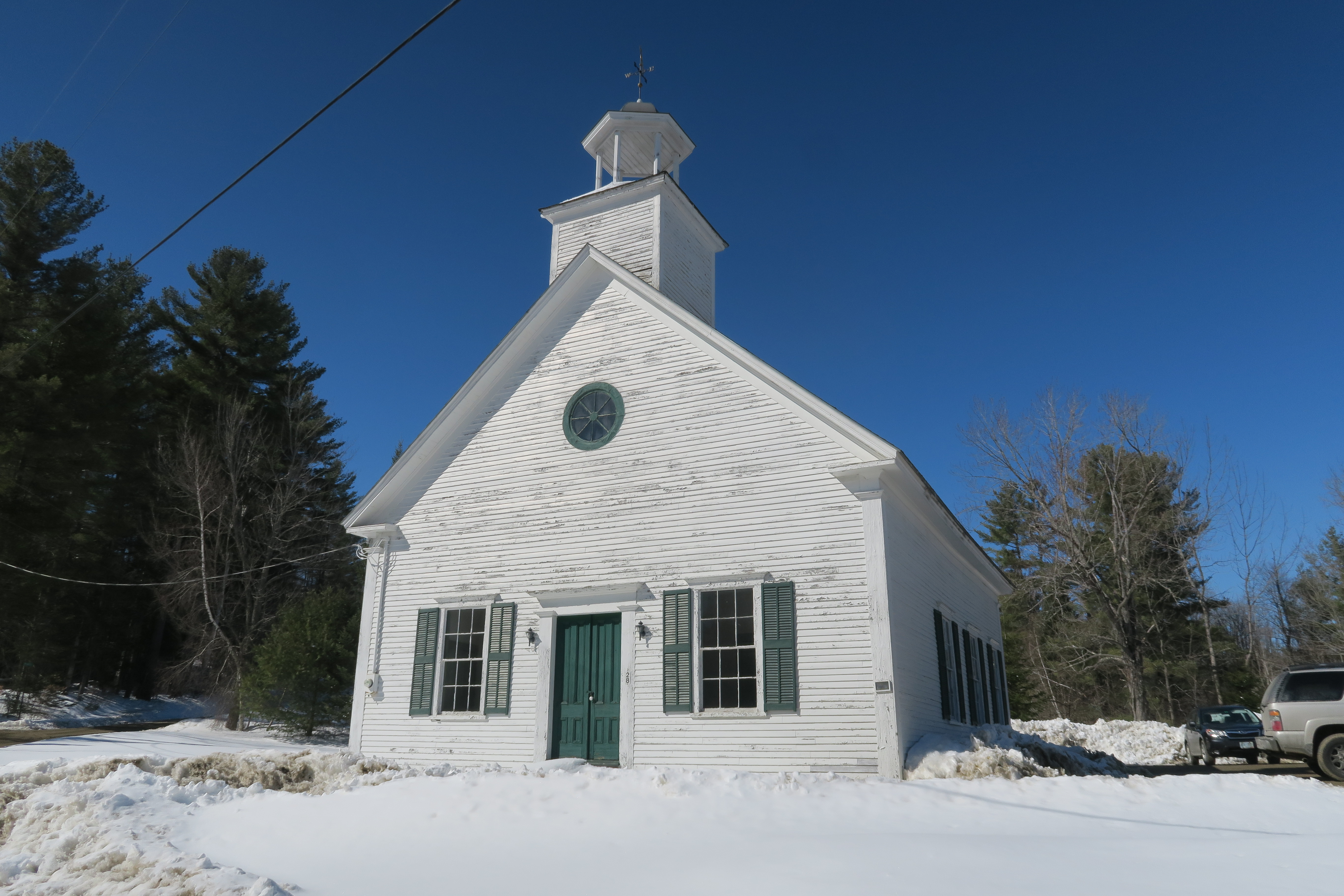
- Dorchester Community Church

- Seal

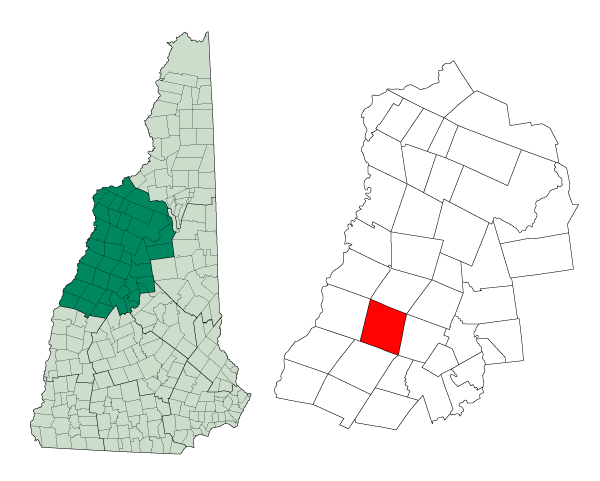
- Location in Grafton County, New Hampshire
- Coordinates: 43°45′18″N 71°58′55″W
- Country: United States
- State: New Hampshire
- County: Grafton
- Incorporated: 1772
- Villages: Dorchester; Bucks Corner; Cheever; North Dorchester

Area
  - Total: 45.2 sq mi (117.1 km^{2})
  - Land: 44.6 sq mi (115.5 km^{2})
  - Water: 0.62 sq mi (1.6 km^{2}) 1.34%
- Elevation: 2,097 ft (639 m)

Population (2020)
  - Total: 339
  - Density: 7.5/sq mi (2.9/km^{2})
- Time zone: UTC−5 (Eastern)
  - Summer (DST): UTC−4 (Eastern)
- ZIP Code: 03266
- Area code: 603
- FIPS code: 33-18740
- GNIS feature ID: 873579
- Website: townofdorchester.org

Dorchester is a town in Grafton County, New Hampshire, United States. The population was 339 at the 2020 census.

== History ==
Originally granted by Governor Benning Wentworth in 1761, Dorchester was named for Dorchester in Dorset, England. When the recipients failed to take up the grant, it was regranted in 1766, but also without success. Finally, it was regranted by Governor John Wentworth to 72 people on May 1, 1772, and settlement began soon thereafter. The first settlers were Benjamin Rice and Stephen Murch from Hanover, but originally from Connecticut.

When the first census of Dorchester was taken in 1790, there were 175 residents. By 1859, when the population reached 711, there were eleven sawmills, in addition to several clapboard and shingle mills. Charcoal was also manufactured here.

== Geography ==
According to the United States Census Bureau, the town has a total area of 45.2 square miles (117.1 km^{2}), of which 44.6 square miles (115.5 km^{2}) are land and 0.62 square miles (1.6 km^{2}) are water, comprising 1.34% of the town. It is drained by the north-flowing South Branch Baker River and the south-flowing Mascoma River and its tributary, the Indian River. Cummins Pond and Reservoir Pond are in the west. The northeastern half of town, which drains to the South Branch of the Baker, is part of the Merrimack River watershed, while the southwestern half is part of the Connecticut River watershed. The highest point in Dorchester is on its western boundary, where the elevation reaches 3,190 feet (970 m) above sea level, just east of the summit of Smarts Mountain.

The town is crossed by New Hampshire Route 118.

== Demographics ==
Historical population
Census	Pop.	Note	%±
1790	175		—
1800	349		99.4%
1810	537		53.9%
1820	584		8.8%
1830	702		20.2%
1840	769		9.5%
1850	711		−7.5%
1860	691		−2.8%
1870	689		−0.3%
1880	585		−15.1%
1890	370		−36.8%
1900	308		−16.8%
1910	241		−21.8%
1920	228		−5.4%
1930	115		−49.6%
1940	144		25.2%
1950	133		−7.6%
1960	91		−31.6%
1970	141		54.9%
1980	244		73.0%
1990	392		60.7%
2000	353		−9.9%
2010	355		0.6%
2020	339		−4.5%
U.S. Decennial Census

At the 2000 census there were 353 people, 132 households, and 99 families in the town. The population density was 7.9 people per square mile (3.0/km^{2}). There were 236 housing units at an average density of 5.3 per square mile (2.0/km^{2}). The racial makeup of the town was 97.17% White, 0.28% African American, 0.28% Native American, 0.85% Asian, 0.85% from other races, and 0.57% from two or more races. Hispanic or Latino of any race were 0.57%.

Of the 132 households 35.6% had children under the age of 18 living with them, 59.8% were married couples living together, 9.8% had a female householder with no husband present, and 25.0% were non-families. 19.7% of households were one person and 6.1% were one person aged 65 or older. The average household size was 2.67 and the average family size was 3.02.

The age distribution was 27.5% under the age of 18, 5.4% from 18 to 24, 26.3% from 25 to 44, 28.9% from 45 to 64, and 11.9% 65 or older. The median age was 40 years. For every 100 females, there were 98.3 males. For every 100 females age 18 and over, there were 95.4 males.

The median household income was $40,833 and the median family income was $42,292. Males had a median income of $35,000 versus $24,375 for females. The per capita income for the town was $18,940. About 8.6% of families and 11.3% of the population were below the poverty line, including 17.2% of those under age 18 and 9.5% of those age 65 or over.

== Notable people ==
- Rufus Blodgett (1834–1910), US senator from New Jersey
- Albert Woodworth (1843–1908), businessman, state legislator
