= Mascoma River =

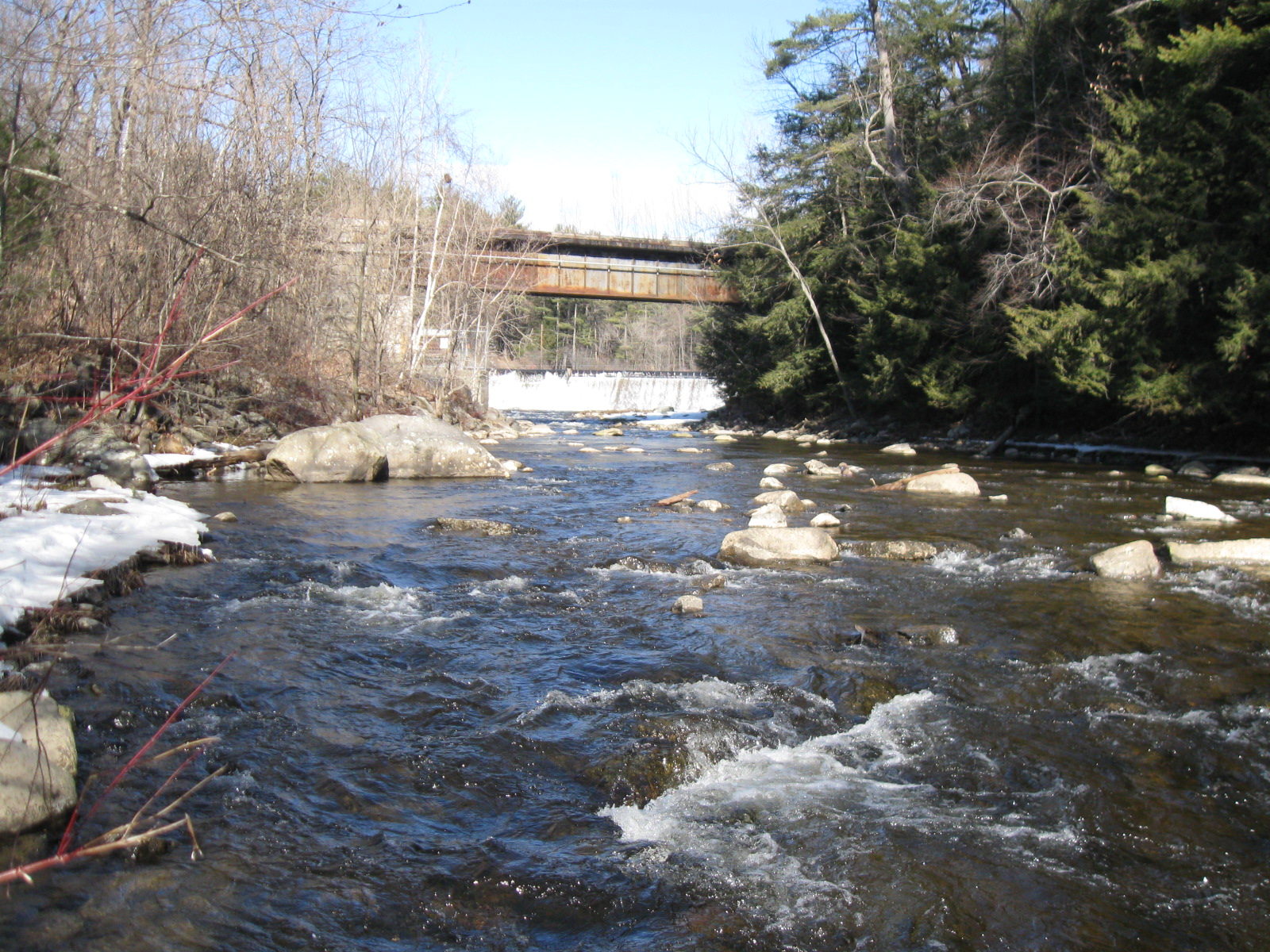
- Mascoma River in 2012 at Riverside Park, Lebanon, NH

- Location within New Hampshire Location within the United States

Location
- Country: United States
- State: New Hampshire
- County: Grafton
- Towns: Dorchester, Canaan, Enfield, Lebanon

Physical characteristics
- Source: Cummins Pond
  - location: Dorchester
  - coordinates: 43°46′40″N 72°0′54″W
  - elevation: 1,525 ft (465 m)
- Mouth: Connecticut River
  - location: Lebanon
  - coordinates: 43°38′9″N 72°19′34″W
  - elevation: 330 ft (100 m)
- Length: 31.6 mi (50.9 km)

Basin features
- Tributaries
  - left: Indian River, Crystal Lake Brook, Knox River, Stony Brook, Great Brook
  - right: Clark Pond Brook, Goose Pond Brook, Lovejoy Brook

The Mascoma River is a 31.6-mile-long (50.9 km) river in western New Hampshire in the United States. It is a tributary of the Connecticut River, which flows to Long Island Sound. The Mascoma comprises two sections which are split by Mascoma Lake in the communities of Enfield and Lebanon. Counting the lake would add 2.7 miles (4.3 km) to the river's length.

The Mascoma River begins at Cummins Pond in a heavily forested part of the town of Dorchester and flows south into the town of Canaan, collecting water flowing from Reservoir Pond, Clark Pond, and Canaan Street Lake before reaching the Indian River. Here it turns west, collecting tributaries arriving from Goose Pond and Crystal Lake, before it passes through the mill town of Enfield and arrives at Mascoma Lake.

At the western end of Mascoma Lake, the Mascoma River, now in Lebanon, drops quickly over rapids, passing numerous small hydroelectric dams in the center of Lebanon and on its way to West Lebanon, where it reaches the Connecticut River. The section of the river immediately downstream of the Mascoma Lake dam is reserved for fly fishing only, while other portions of the river are open for all types of fishermen. The river is stocked by the New Hampshire Fish and Game Department.

For most of its path from the Indian River to the Connecticut, the Mascoma River and its valley have influenced the location of numerous transportation routes, including U.S. Route 4 and an inactive, state-owned rail line known as the Northern Railroad, most of which has now been converted to the Northern Rail Trail.

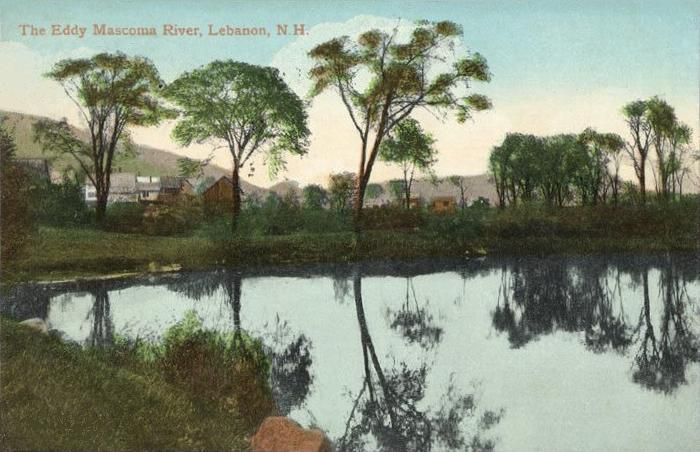
Mascoma River in 1909

== See also ==
- List of rivers of New Hampshire
