= Canaan, New Hampshire =

- Town
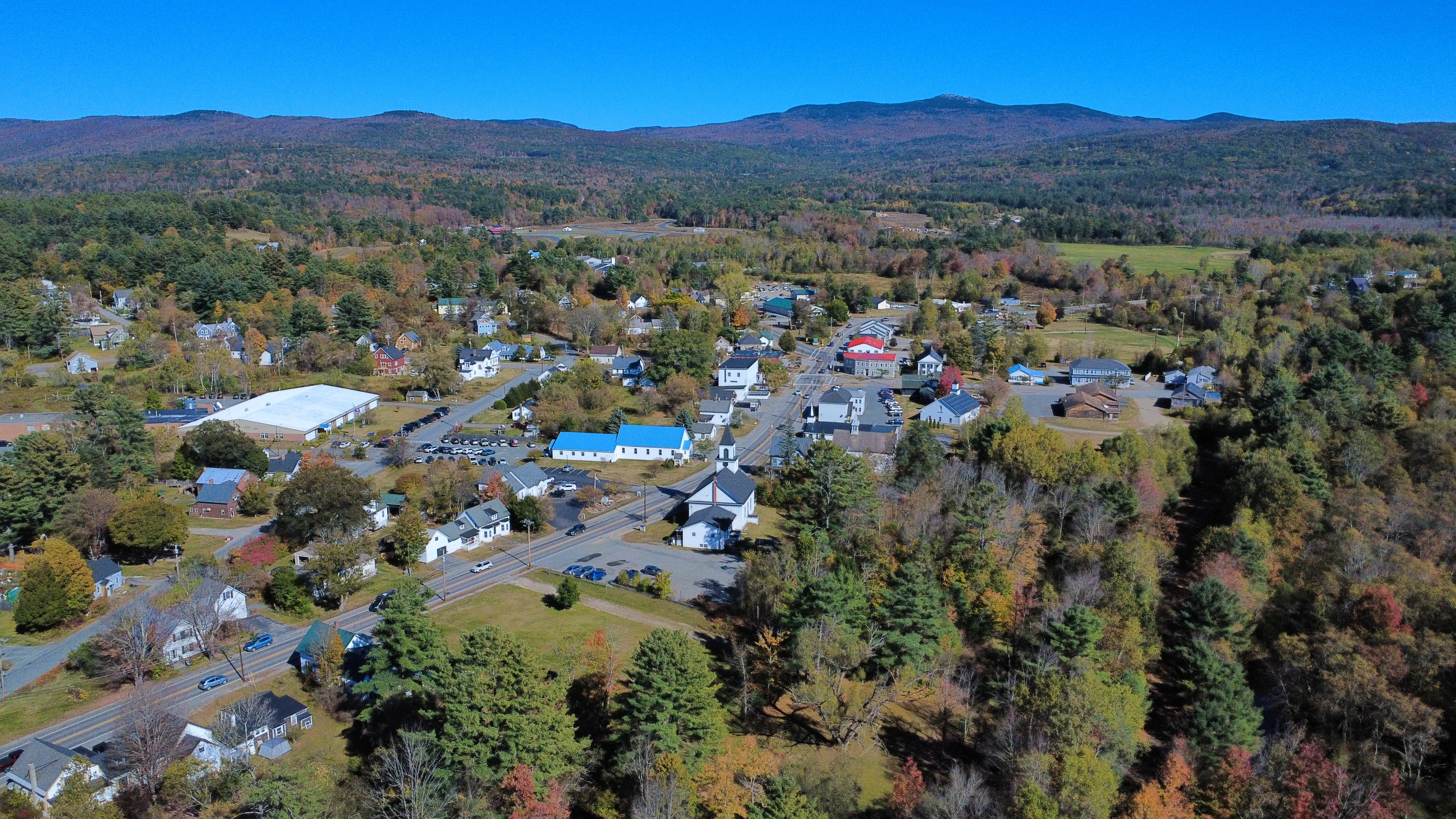
- Canaan, NH, from the west

- Seal
- Motto: "Land of Milk and Honey"
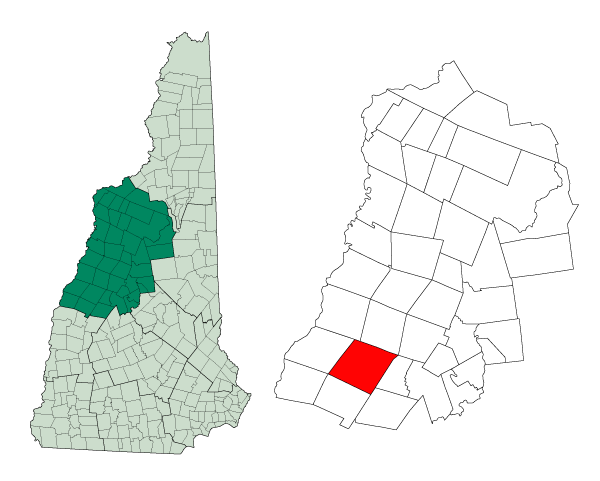
- Location in Grafton County, New Hampshire
- Coordinates: 43°39′48″N 72°03′32″W
- Country: United States
- State: New Hampshire
- County: Grafton
- Incorporated: 1761
- Villages: Canaan; Canaan Center; Canaan Street; West Canaan

Area
  - Total: 55.1 sq mi (142.8 km^{2})
  - Land: 53.4 sq mi (138.2 km^{2})
  - Water: 1.8 sq mi (4.6 km^{2}) 3.20%
- Elevation: 1,034 ft (315 m)

Population (2020)
  - Total: 3,794
  - Density: 71/sq mi (27.5/km^{2})
- Time zone: UTC−5 (Eastern)
  - Summer (DST): UTC−4 (Eastern)
- ZIP code: 03741
- Area code: 603
- FIPS code: 33-08980
- GNIS feature ID: 873557
- Website: www.canaannh.gov

Canaan is a town in Grafton County, New Hampshire, United States. The population was 3,794 at the 2020 census. It is the location of Mascoma State Forest. Canaan is home to the Cardigan Mountain School, the town's largest employer.

The main village of the town, where 442 people resided at the 2020 census, is defined as the Canaan census-designated place (CDP), and is located at the junction of U.S. Route 4 with New Hampshire Route 118.

== History ==
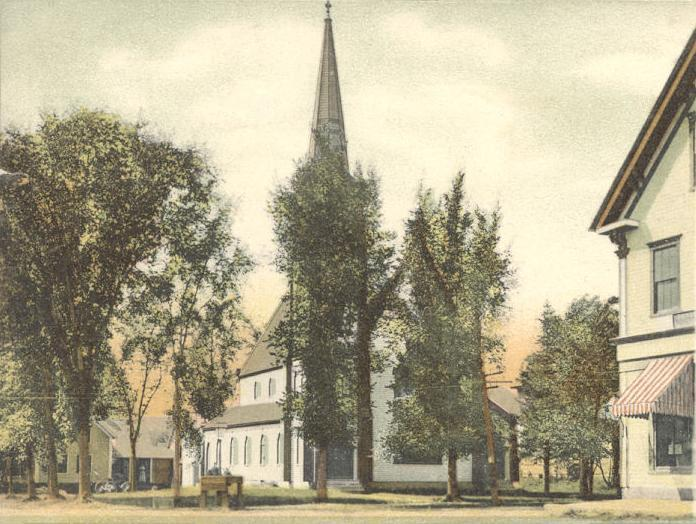
Church Street in 1907

Chartered in 1761 by Governor Benning Wentworth, the town was named after the hometown of many early settlers, Canaan, Connecticut, which had been named by Puritans for the biblical land of Canaan. It was settled in the winter of 1766–1767 by John Scofield, who arrived with all his belongings on a hand sled. The land was filled with rocks, making agriculture difficult. The town constructed a broad road for its main street on a stretch of level land.

In 1828 attorney George Kimball helped organize building the town's Congregational church. He was among the New England abolitionists who founded Noyes Academy in March 1835, one of the first schools in the region to admit students of all races. It opened with 28 white students, drawn largely from local families, and 17 black students; most of the latter came from outside the town and across the Northeastern United States. Many local residents opposed bringing blacks into the town. On August 10, 1835, five hundred white men from Canaan and nearby towns used "nearly 100 yoke of oxen" to pull the building off its foundation, then burned it. Fearing for their safety, the black students left town, as did Kimball, who moved to Alton, Illinois.

Canaan Union Academy was built on the site and was limited to white students; it operated for the next 20 years. After the academy's closing, residents sympathetic to fugitive slaves operated a station of the Underground Railroad to help the people reach Canada or settle in New England.

The Northern Railroad (predecessor of the Boston & Maine Railroad) was constructed to the town in 1847, spurring development. Water powered mills were built on the streams. By 1859, the population had reached 1,682, and Canaan had one gristmill, three lath and clapboard mills, and one tannery.

The Canaan train wreck occurred on September 15, 1907. Four miles (6.4 km) west of Canaan Station, the southbound Quebec to Boston express, crowded with passengers returning from the Sherbrooke Fair, collided head-on with a northbound Boston & Maine freight train. The accident claimed 26 lives, and 17 others were seriously injured. The accident was found to be due to a mistake made by a dispatcher, who mis-identified a train in one of his communications. It remains the train wreck with the largest loss of life in New Hampshire history.

On June 2, 1923, the Great Canaan Fire burned 48 homes and businesses, destroying the heart of Canaan Village (East Canaan).

== Geography ==
According to the United States Census Bureau, the town has a total area of 55.1 square miles (142.8 km^{2}), of which 53.4 square miles (138.2 km^{2}) are land and 1.8 square miles (4.6 km^{2}) are water, comprising 3.20% of the town. Canaan is drained by the Mascoma River and its tributary, the Indian River, which flows past Canaan village. Canaan Street Lake is in the center, and Goose Pond is in the northwest.

Mount Cardigan, overlooking Canaan village, lies to the east in the neighboring town of Orange. A mountain road leads from Canaan to a trailhead in Cardigan Mountain State Forest, where hiking trails on the west slope of the mountain lead to the 3,155-foot (962 m) bare-rock summit. The highest point in Canaan is the top of an unnamed ridge (approximately 2,270 feet (690 m) above sea level) in the northeastern corner of town, overlooking Derby Pond.

Canaan lies almost fully within the Connecticut River watershed, except for the northeastern corner of the town, which drains north to the Baker River and is part of the Merrimack River watershed.

The town is crossed by U.S. Route 4 and New Hampshire Route 118.

== Demographics ==
Historical population
Census	Pop.	Note	%±
1790	483		—
1800	835		72.9%
1810	1,094		31.0%
1820	1,198		9.5%
1830	1,428		19.2%
1840	1,576		10.4%
1850	1,682		6.7%
1860	1,762		4.8%
1870	1,877		6.5%
1880	1,762		−6.1%
1890	1,417		−19.6%
1900	1,444		1.9%
1910	1,408		−2.5%
1920	1,236		−12.2%
1930	1,301		5.3%
1940	1,377		5.8%
1950	1,465		6.4%
1960	1,507		2.9%
1970	1,923		27.6%
1980	2,456		27.7%
1990	3,045		24.0%
2000	3,319		9.0%
2010	3,909		17.8%
2020	3,794		−2.9%
U.S. Decennial Census

As of the census of 2010, there were 3,909 people, 1,588 households, and 1,105 families residing in the town. The population density was 73.5 inhabitants per square mile (28.4/km^{2}). There were 1,930 housing units at an average density of 36.3 per square mile (14.0/km^{2}). The racial makeup of the town was 97.1% White, 0.1% African American, 0.2% Native American, 1.0% Asian, 0.2% some other race, and 1.3% from two or more races. Hispanic or Latino of any race were 0.8% of the population.

There were 1,588 households, of which 28.7% had children under the age of 18 living with them, 55.0% were headed by married couples living together, 9.4% had a female householder with no husband present, and 30.4% were non-families. 23.3% of all households were made up of individuals, and 7.6% were someone living alone who was 65 years of age or older. The average household size was 2.42, and the average family size was 2.81.

In the town, the population was spread out, with 20.9% under the age of 18, 6.6% from 18 to 24, 25.8% from 25 to 44, 33.7% from 45 to 64, and 12.9% who were 65 years of age or older. The median age was 42.6 years. For every 100 females, there were 99.5 males. For every 100 females age 18 and over, there were 98.3 males.

For the period 2007–2011, the estimated median annual income for a household in the town was $62,226, and the median income for a family was $63,930. Male full-time workers had a median income of $46,250 versus $37,287 for females. The per capita income for the town was $26,964. About 4.5% of families and 6.4% of the population were below the poverty line, including 5.7% of those under age 18 and 6.3% of those age 65 or over.

In 2014 the largest ancestry groups reported in Canaan were English (17.8%), "American" (17.4%), French or French Canadian (14.2%), and Irish (12.6%).

== Education ==
Canaan is the home of Mascoma Valley Regional High School.

== Gallery ==
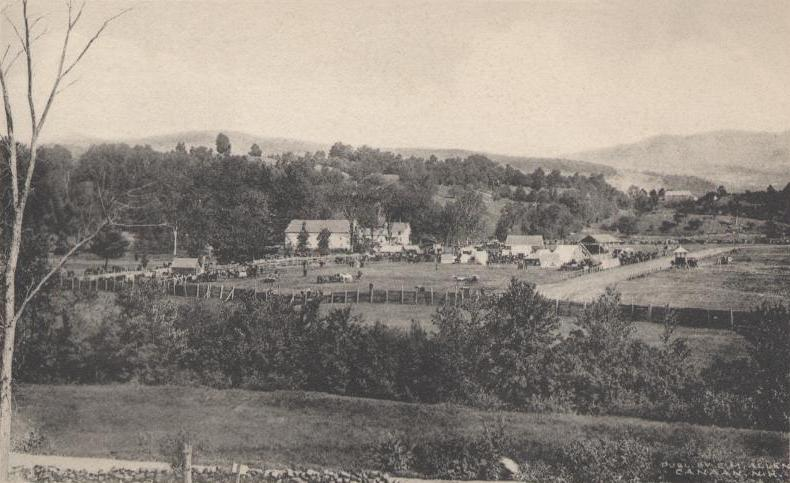
View of the Canaan Fair c. 1906

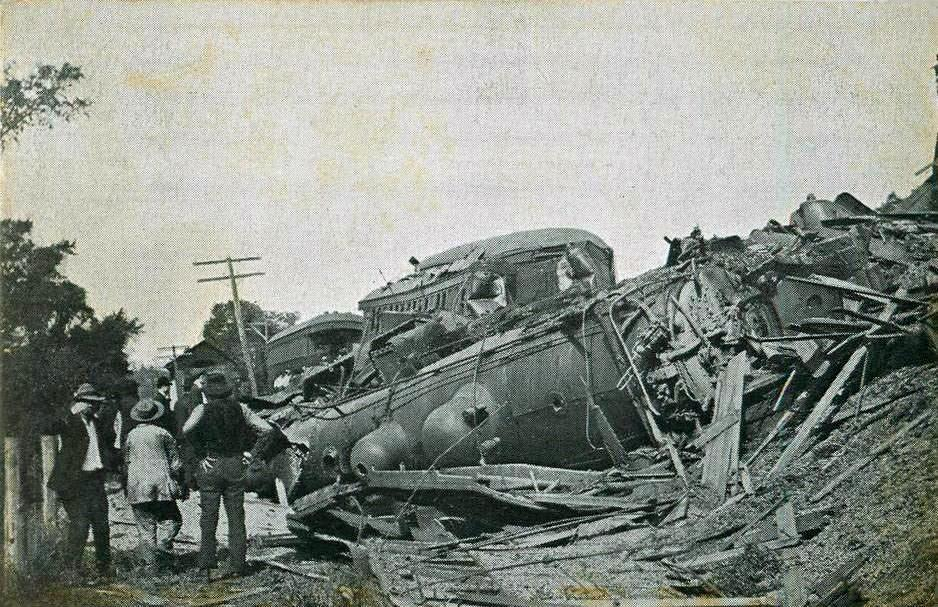
Canaan train wreck of 1907

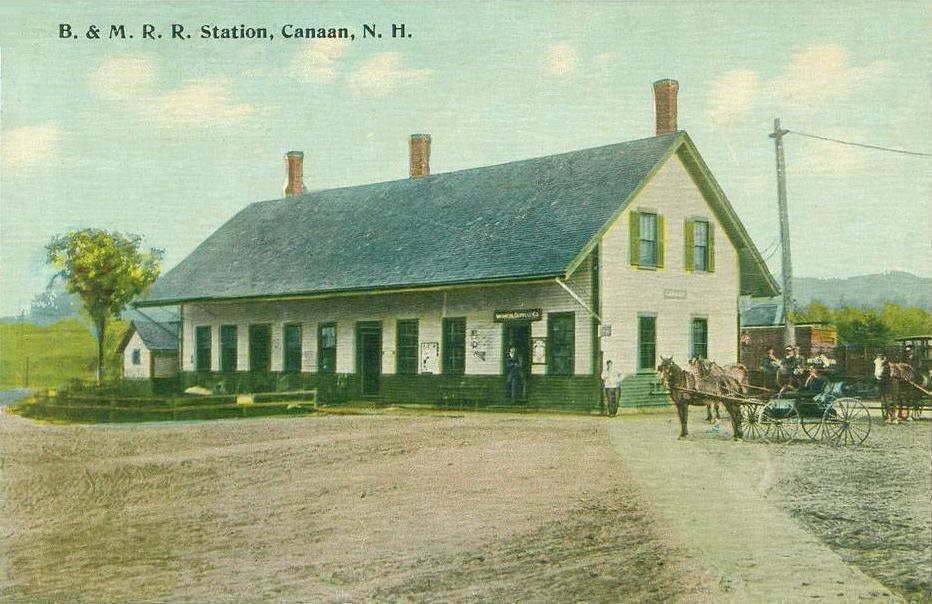
Boston & Maine railroad depot in 1911

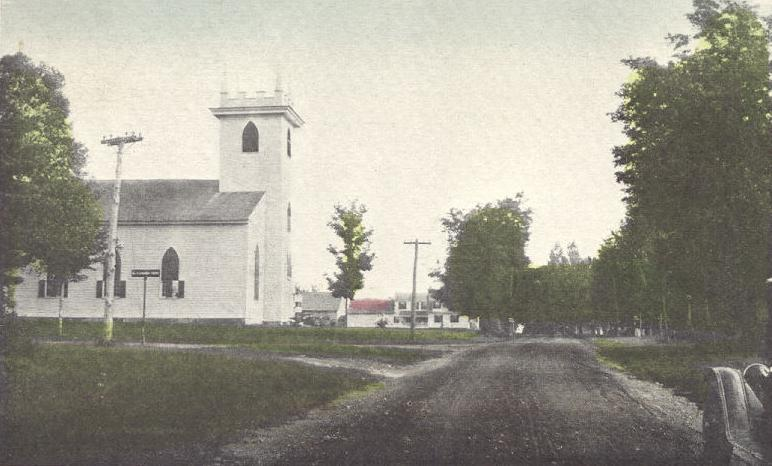
Old North Church c. 1915

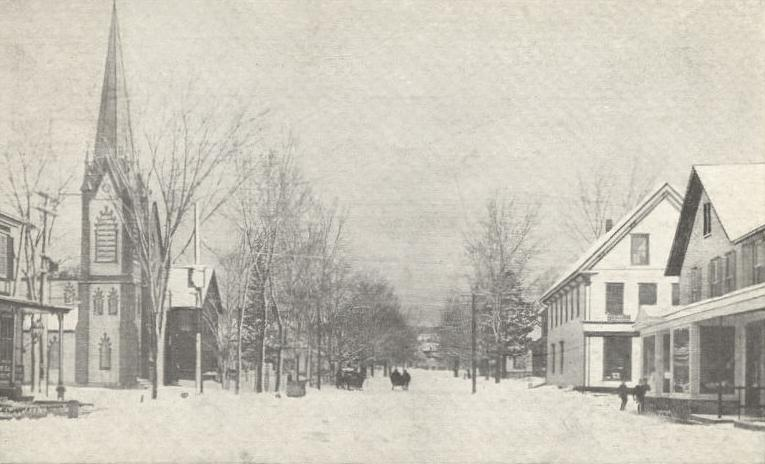
Canaan Village c. 1915 (before 1923 fire)

== Sites of interest ==
- Canaan Historical Museum
- Canaan Motor Club, auto racetrack
- Northern Rail Trail

== Notable people ==
- Gavin Bayreuther (born 1994), NHL player
- Daniel Blaisdell (1762–1833), US congressman
- Henry G. Burleigh (1832–1900), US congressman from New York
- Frank Dunklee Currier (1853–1921), US congressman
- Joshua Smith (1760–1795), author (Divine Hymns, or Spiritual Songs)
- Anna Augusta Truitt (1837–1920), philanthropist, temperance reformer, essayist
