= Donald McFarlane =

British-American politician

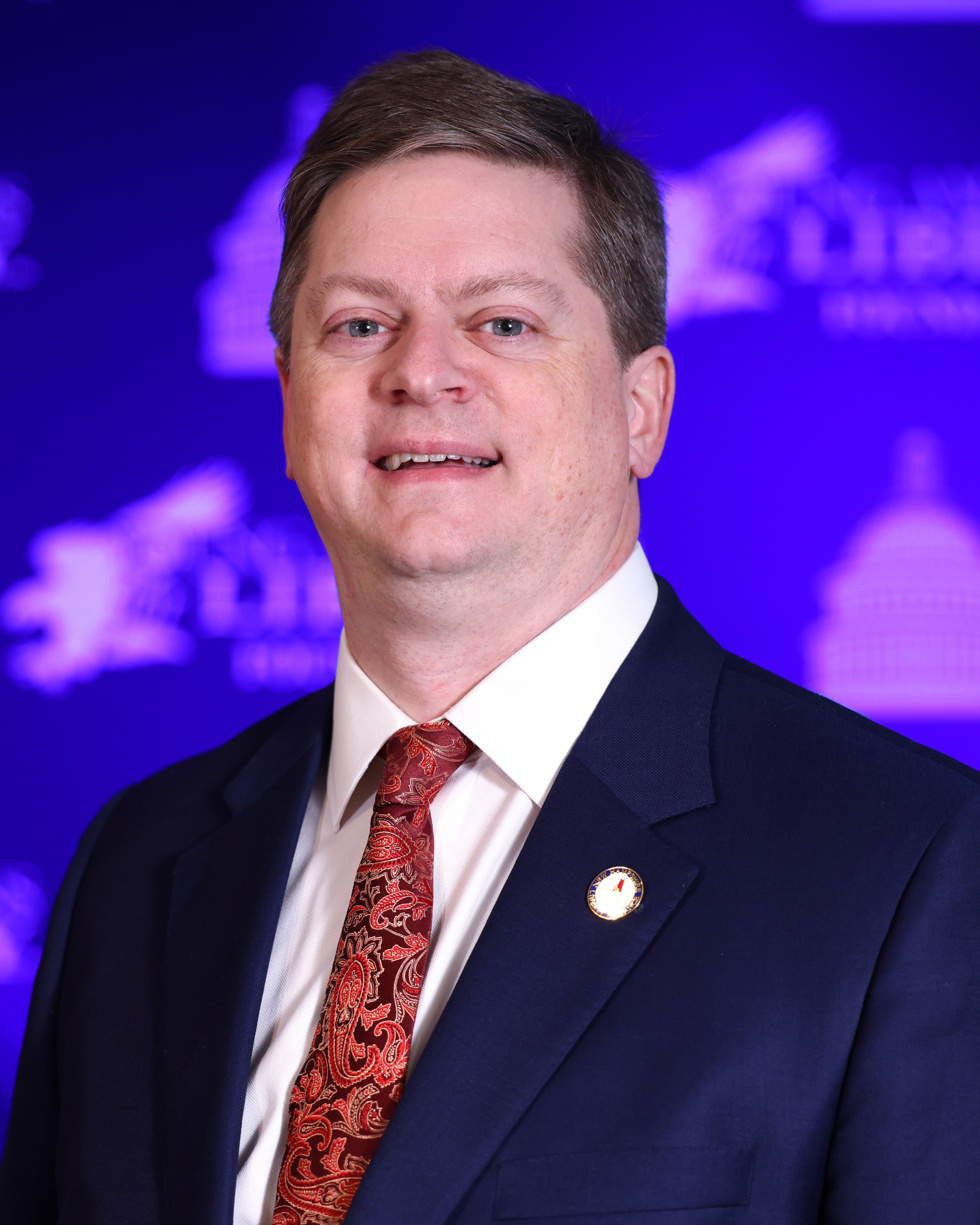
- McFarlane at the 2024 Hazlitt Summit hosted by Young Americans for Liberty Foundation

Member of the New Hampshire House of Representatives from the Grafton 18th district
- Incumbent
- Assumed office December 4, 2024
- Preceded by: John Sellers
- Succeeded by: Marko Kloos (elect)

Personal details
- Born: Donald Stewart McFarlane United Kingdom
- Party: Republican
- Spouse: Karen Marcovici
- Occupation: Cybersecurity consultant; politician

Donald Stewart McFarlane is a British-American politician and cybersecurity consultant. He serves as a Republican member of the New Hampshire House of Representatives from the Grafton 18th district. The district represents the towns of Alexandria, Bridgewater, Bristol, Canaan, Dorchester, Enfield, Grafton, Groton, Hebron, and Orange. McFarlane is a member of the planning board and budgeting committee for the town of Orange, where he has lived since 2008.

McFarlane is on the advisory board of red-team vendor Xcape Inc. He is a former Chief Information Security Officer (CISO) for American International Group Investments and Bluestone Capital Partners, and Business Information Security Officer (BISO) at Merrill Lynch. He has contributed at many hacker conferences and is the owner of McFarlane Associates, LLC.

== Life ==
McFarlane was raised in the United Kingdom and the United States. He became a permanent resident of the United States in 1995 after he finished his studies and served in the military. He is an electrical engineering graduate. He became an American citizen in 2002. McFarlane and his wife Karen married in 2012. They have one son and a dog named Neep. McFarlane first ran for the Grafton 9th district in the New Hampshire House of Representatives in 2022, winning the Republican party primary but losing the general election to Corinne Morse. He won the November 2024 election against Carolyn Fluehr-Lobban for the Grafton 18th district.

== Political views ==
McFarlane supports a "constitutional, limited government". He is an advocate of school choice.

== Electoral history ==
New Hampshire House of Representatives general election for the Grafton 18 district, 2024 Source:
Party	Candidate	Votes	%
Republican	Donald McFarlane	5,533	52.2
Democratic	Carolyn Fluehr-Lobban	5,070	47.8
Total votes		10,603	100

New Hampshire House of Representatives general election for the Grafton 9th district, 2022 Source:
Party	Candidate	Votes	%
Democratic	Corinne Morse	1,030	54.1
Republican	Donald McFarlane	875	45.9
Total votes		1,905	100
