= Catherine Mulholland =

American politician (born 1940)

Member of the New Hampshire House of Representatives
- In office December 1, 2004 – October 13, 2010
- Preceded by: Edward "Ned" Densmore
- Succeeded by: Paul Mirski; Charles E. Sova
- Constituency: Grafton 10th
- In office December 5, 2012 – June 4, 2014
- Preceded by: District established
- Succeeded by: Stephen Darrow
- Constituency: Grafton 17th

Personal details
- Born: June 1940 (age 86) England
- Party: Democratic
- Education: Somerville College, Oxford; UCL School of Slavonic and East European Studies
- Occupation: Financial consultant; politician

Catherine Mulholland (née Turner; born June 1940) is an English American former politician and financial consultant. She was a member of the New Hampshire House of Representatives from Grafton County, who first represented the 10th district from 2004 to 2010, then the 17th district from 2012 to 2014.

She is the former elected chair of the three-person board of Trustees of the Trust Funds of the town of Grafton, New Hampshire.

== Education ==
Mulholland matriculated at Somerville College, Oxford, in 1959. She has received master's degrees from the University of Oxford and from the University College London School of Slavonic and East European Studies.

== Career ==
Mulholland worked as a financial consultant. She first ran for election to the New Hampshire House of Representatives for the Grafton 10th district in 2004. She received the most votes in the Democratic primary election and the third-most votes in the 2004 general election. She won the final seat for the three-member district in the election. She was re-elected in 2006 and received the second-most votes in the primary and the most in the general election. In 2008, she received the third-most votes in the primary and general elections. In 2009, Mulholland incurred the highest amount of expenses among Grafton County's delegation in the New Hampshire House of Representatives. She received the third-most votes in the Democratic primary elections for the Grafton 10th district in 2010, but lost in the general election. She lost after having received the fifth-most votes in the general election of six candidates.

Mulholland ran again for a seat in the New Hampshire House of Representatives in 2012, this time for the Grafton 17th district. She won 73.7% of the votes in the Democratic party primary election and won the general election with 53.2% of the vote against Paul H. Simard. She opposed Senate Bill 126, known as the New Hampshire Dealers Bill of Rights, and said it "would not just level the playing field, but tip it violently in favor of the dealers." She ran for re-election from the same district in 2014, and won the Democratic party primary but lost the general election to Stephen Darrow. In 2015, she backed Martin O'Malley in the 2016 Democratic Party presidential primaries. She ran against Darrow a second time in 2016, but again lost the general election.

She ran for the Grafton 9th district in 2018, and received the most votes in the Democratic primary election, but received the third-most votes in the general election for the two-member district. Mulholland ran for the same district in 2020. She received the most votes in the primary for the district, receiving 645 votes over Carolyn Fluehr-Lobban's 435 votes and Richard Lobban's 278 votes. However, she lost the general election, receiving the third-most votes with Lex Berezhny and Ned Gordon going on to represent the district.

Mulholland most recently ran for the Grafton 10th district in 2022 and was endorsed by the New Hampshire AFL-CIO. She won the Democratic party primary election without opposition, but lost the general election to Lex Berezhny.

== Political positions ==
While in the New Hampshire House of Representatives, she sought to revive the soda tax that had been proposed in 2010.

While a candidate for office in 2020, Mulholland indicated she supported the legalization of non-medical cannabis to lower the costs of law enforcement, prison populations, and provide additional revenue to the state. She also advocated for increased access to police misconduct reports, for phasing out fossil fuels, for compulsory voting in the United States and said she prefers "to see the adoption of the Australian model".

== 2024 incident ==
On April 27, 2024, the Lebanon Police Department responded to an "incident at Tractor Supply involving animal cruelty". A Tractor Supply employee called the police reporting an incident of animal cruelty on the premises. Upon further investigation it was determined that "Catherine Mulholland, age 83, of Grafton, NH, reportedly kicked her dogs while inside the store." She told officers that she kicked her dogs to break up an alleged fight between them. However, witnesses also reported that she expressed intentions to shoot her dogs and threatened to shoot an employee who tried to intervene. The dogs were observed to be malnourished, had patchy fur, and "had feces matted into their fur". Her dogs ended up being transferred to the Upper Valley Humane Society.

Mulholland was charged with four counts of cruelty to animals and neglect and one count of criminal threatening. Both charges are misdemeanors. Mulholland was released from jail on a personal recognizance bail and scheduled for a 2nd Circuit Lebanon District Court date of June 10, 2024.
