= John Sellers (New Hampshire politician) =

American politician (born 1956)

Member of the New Hampshire House of Representatives
- Incumbent
- Assumed office December 4, 2024
- Preceded by: Carroll Brown Jr.
- Succeeded by: Marc Bourassa (elect)
- Constituency: Grafton 10th
- In office December 7, 2022 – December 4, 2024
- Succeeded by: Donald McFarlane
- Constituency: Grafton 18th

Personal details
- Born: John Matthew Sellers; March 1956 (age 70) Weymouth, Massachusetts, U.S.
- Party: Republican
- Spouse: Donna
- Children: 9

John Matthew Sellers is an American Republican Party politician who represents the Grafton 10th district in the New Hampshire House of Representatives.

He is strongly against public education and is an advocate of homeschooling and school choice. A former member of the Newfound Area School District budgeting committee from 2020 to 2023, he has suggested that "parents get their children out of the public government schools", claimed public schools are "following the path of Hitler", and stated that the "only things kids learn in [public] schools involve porn and demons". He has been considered to be a conspiracy theorist and has often quoted Hitler, Vladimir Lenin, and Joseph Stalin.

== Life and career ==
Sellers grew up in Weymouth, Massachusetts, with five siblings and joined the United States Air Force after high school. He served in the USAF for six years, worked as a small business owner for many years, was a Senior Business Analyst at SAS Institute and retired in 2021. Sellers was on the Bristol Town Budget Committee and was a member of the Newfound Area School District budget committee. He is a board member of the School District Governance Association of New Hampshire.

He was the plaintiff in the New Hampshire Superior Court case John M Sellers v. Town of Bristol. He sued the town, seeking to invalidate the results of the March 14, 2017, election held by the town, in which he was a candidate, and sought for the town to hold a new election. Sellers ran for one of two open positions on the Board of Selectmen and came in third place in the election. The New Hampshire Superior Court decided that without any fraud, voting irregularities do not invalidate an election unless they affect the result.

In September 2022, Sellers defeated Andrew Ware in the Republican primary election for the Grafton 18th district of the New Hampshire House of Representatives. In November 2022, he defeated Carolyn Fluehr-Lobban in the general election by four votes. He assumed office in December 2022.

In December 2022, Sellers and his wife Donna were granted a special exception by the Town of Bristol to operate a short-term rental Airbnb at their property subject to meeting the fire chiefs requirements.

In June 2023, Sellers was announced as the Grafton County chair of the "New Hampshire Grassroots Leadership Team" for the Donald Trump 2024 presidential campaign.

On December 5, 2023, Sellers was one of four Republican co-sponsors of HB 1248, a bill that would have banned abortion after 15 days of pregnancy. Sellers said he was not sure why the bills author had targeted 15 days, but said he was in favor of any restriction on abortion.

On February 5, 2024, Sellers was the prime sponsor of a bill that he introduced that would ban social–emotional learning in schools and said "It is a tool. It is indoctrination". In September 2024, Sellers joined 30 other New Hampshire House and Senate Republicans in signing an amicus brief calling for the overturn of the Claremont School District v. Governor of New Hampshire decisions decided in 1993 and 1997.

When Sellers was a representative from the Grafton 18th district, he represented the towns of Alexandria, Bridgewater, Bristol, Canaan, Dorchester, Enfield, Grafton, Groton, Hebron, and Orange.

He ran unopposed in the primary and defeated Richard Lobban in the 2024 New Hampshire House of Representatives election for the Grafton 10th district.

In December 2024, Sellers introduced a bill "requiring the discussion of abortion procedures and viewing of certain videos during health education in public schools" and another bill requiring school districts to educate students from grades 9–12 about adoption.

== Open letters ==
Sellers has written many letters to the editor that have been published by The Laconia Daily Sun and others.

- Sellers, John (January 19, 2016). "Bristol's population hasn't grown but the town's budget sure has". The Laconia Daily Sun. Archived from the original on September 25, 2024.
- Sellers, John (February 24, 2016). "I need your vote to make a difference on Bristol Selectboard". The Laconia Daily Sun. Archived from the original on September 25, 2024.
- Sellers, John (July 19, 2016). "Where's the common sense in buying a 38Kw generator for Bristol?". The Laconia Daily Sun. Archived from the original on September 25, 2024.
- Sellers, John (December 14, 2016). "Is Bristol really getting a bang for it increasing tax bucks?". The Laconia Daily Sun. Archived from the original on September 25, 2024.
- Sellers, John (February 8, 2017). "As a Bristol selectman, I am going to work for the taxpayers". The Laconia Daily Sun. Archived from the original on September 25, 2024.
- Sellers, John (March 10, 2017). "Vote for me, John Sellers, for Bristol selectman". The Laconia Daily Sun. Archived from the original on September 25, 2024.
- Sellers, John (February 18, 2019). "Can't say we're 'restoring' the Bristol budget with straight face". The Laconia Daily Sun. Archived from the original on September 25, 2024.
- Sellers, John (February 27, 2019). "Some want Bristol to be Utopia, catering to your every want". The Laconia Daily Sun. Archived from the original on September 25, 2024.
- Sellers, John (March 22, 2019). "Rick Alpers had the votes and his ideas carried the day". The Laconia Daily Sun. Archived from the original on September 25, 2024.
- Sellers, John (July 12, 2019). "Question cost & effectiveness of new Bristol sewer line". The Laconia Daily Sun. Archived from the original on July 14, 2019.
- Sellers, John (February 1, 2020). "Vote for Sellers, and vote yes on warrant articles". The Laconia Daily Sun. Archived from the original on September 25, 2024.
- Sellers, John (March 24, 2020). "John Sellers: Keeping asking that neighbor of yours if you can help". The Laconia Daily Sun. Archived from the original on September 25, 2024.
- Sellers, John (October 29, 2020). "John Sellers: Once you lose your freedoms, they won't ever come back". The Laconia Daily Sun. Archived from the original on September 25, 2024.
- Sellers, John (September 2, 2020). "John Sellers: Cast your vote for people who have good moral compasses". The Laconia Daily Sun. Archived from the original on September 25, 2024.
- Sellers, John (December 16, 2020). "John Sellers: NH still land of live free or die". The Laconia Daily Sun. Archived from the original on January 22, 2021.
- Sellers, John (April 21, 2021). "John Sellers: Masks, vaccinations and personal freedoms". The Laconia Daily Sun. Archived from the original on September 24, 2024.
- Sellers, John (May 17, 2021). "John Sellers: Schools should focus on teaching core subjects instead of theories". The Laconia Daily Sun. Archived from the original on September 25, 2024.
- Sellers, John (May 28, 2021). "John Sellers: School funders should start changing with the times, look outside the box". The Laconia Daily Sun. Archived from the original on May 8, 2025.
- Sellers, John (June 22, 2021). "John Sellers: We all could be called terrorists one day". The Laconia Daily Sun. Archived from the original on September 25, 2024.
- Sellers, John (August 10, 2021). "John Sellers: Student mask use should not still be up for debate". The Laconia Daily Sun. Archived from the original on August 24, 2021.
- Sellers, John (September 21, 2021). "John Sellers: School board in need of new representation". The Laconia Daily Sun. Archived from the original on September 25, 2024.
- Sellers, John (January 14, 2022). "John Sellers: Bristol Selectboard should respect taxpayers about sewer project". The Laconia Daily Sun. Archived from the original on January 18, 2022.
- Sellers, John (January 26, 2022). "John Sellers: Time for good, moral people to stand up for what's right". The Laconia Daily Sun. Archived from the original on September 25, 2024.
- Sellers, John (February 16, 2022). "John Sellers: Aubrey Freedman, Danielle Reed are qualified candidates for Newfound School Board". The Laconia Daily Sun. Archived from the original on September 24, 2024.
- Sellers, John (March 18, 2022). "John Sellers: Teaching is out of control, HB 1255 is needed". The Laconia Daily Sun. Archived from the original on March 19, 2022.
- Sellers, John (March 30, 2022). "John Sellers: Stop infighting and unite against democratic destruction of state and country". The Laconia Daily Sun. Archived from the original on April 4, 2022.
- Sellers, John (April 8, 2022). "John Sellers: Freedom can be harmed by democracy". The Laconia Daily Sun. Archived from the original on May 3, 2022.
- Sellers, John (May 19, 2022). "John Sellers: Price of heating oil will force changes in lifestyle, spending". The Laconia Daily Sun. Archived from the original on September 25, 2024.
- Sellers, John (May 26, 2022). "John Sellers: Bible and God have already been banned". The Laconia Daily Sun. Archived from the original on September 25, 2024.
- Sellers, John (June 2, 2022). "John Sellers: Using fear to sell an agenda instead of backing up with facts". The Laconia Daily Sun. Archived from the original on September 24, 2024.
- Sellers, John (June 28, 2022). "John Sellers: Leaders have lost sight of meaning of Declaration of Independence". The Laconia Daily Sun. Archived from the original on September 24, 2024.
- Sellers, John (July 13, 2022). "John Sellers: Price of everything higher than a year ago". The Laconia Daily Sun. Archived from the original on September 25, 2024.
- Sellers, John (July 26, 2022). "John Sellers: Gunstock team's resignation hurts more than Belknap County". The Laconia Daily Sun. Archived from the original on September 25, 2024.
- Sellers, John (August 15, 2022). "John Sellers: What is motivation behind voting out current representatives?". The Laconia Daily Sun. Archived from the original on September 25, 2024.
- Sellers, John (November 3, 2022). "John Sellers: Women's choice is important but only when right issues are at stake". The Laconia Daily Sun. Archived from the original on September 25, 2024.
- Sellers, John (November 22, 2022). "John Sellers: Compromise the key starting point to healing political divides". The Laconia Daily Sun. Archived from the original on March 4, 2023.
- Sellers, John (January 2, 2023). "Rep. John Sellers: The only things kids learn in schools involve porn and demons". The Laconia Daily Sun. Archived from the original on September 24, 2024.
- Sellers, John (March 15, 2023). "Rep. John Sellers: State rep who lashed out at plow driver is innocent until proven guilty". The Laconia Daily Sun. Archived from the original on March 15, 2023.
- Sellers, John (May 2, 2023). "Rep. John Sellers: New Hampton residents need Wendelboe before it's too late". The Laconia Daily Sun. Archived from the original on May 13, 2023.
- Sellers, John (May 22, 2023). "Rep. John Sellers: Home schooling an easy educational alternative to public schools". The Laconia Daily Sun. Archived from the original on May 23, 2023.
- Sellers, John (May 29, 2023). "Rep. John Sellers: Parents obligated to override opinions of teachers, doctors". The Laconia Daily Sun. Archived from the original on March 30, 2023.
- Sellers, John (June 22, 2023). "Rep. John Sellers: Take kids out of schools, which are following path of Hitler". The Laconia Daily Sun. Archived from the original on September 24, 2024.
- Sellers, John (July 12, 2023). "Rep. John Sellers: Nuclear power is abundant, safe and could be cost-effective". The Laconia Daily Sun. Archived from the original on July 13, 2023.
- Sellers, John (August 17, 2023). "Rep. John Sellers: Democrats say one thing, then vote to do the opposite". The Laconia Daily Sun. Archived from the original on October 2, 2023.
- Sellers, John (August 21, 2023). "Democrats represent the evil around us". Valley News.
- Sellers, John (September 26, 2023). "Rep. John Sellers: Stand up to the evil Democrats before state is forever lost". The Laconia Daily Sun. Archived from the original on September 24, 2024.
- Sellers, John (November 14, 2023). "United Nations, equality and libraries are trying to control you and your kids". The Laconia Daily Sun. Archived from the original on November 16, 2023.
- Sellers, John (December 4, 2023). "Rep. John Sellers: Schools take students' info, introduce evil wellness concepts". The Laconia Daily Sun. Archived from the original on December 8, 2023.
- Sellers, John (December 14, 2023). "Rep. John Sellers: If Jesus had been aborted, we wouldn't have salvation or Christmas". The Laconia Daily Sun. Archived from the original on September 25, 2024.
- Sellers, John (December 19, 2023). "Rep. John Sellers: Take children out of school before they learn wellness instead of God". The Laconia Daily Sun. Archived from the original on September 25, 2024.
- Sellers, John (June 14, 2024). "Rep. John Sellers: Why are the real Democrats putting up with what their party is doing?". The Laconia Daily Sun. Archived from the original on September 24, 2024.
- Sellers, John (July 17, 2024). "Rep. John Sellers: Shooting the competition happens in a banana republic". The Laconia Daily Sun. Archived from the original on September 24, 2024.
- Sellers, John (August 21, 2024). "Rep. John Sellers: Representative looks forward to seeing voters at Bristol Old Home Day". The Laconia Daily Sun. Archived from the original on September 24, 2024.
- Sellers, John (September 4, 2024). "Rep. John Sellers: Clarifying voting record of write-in candidate O'Hara". The Laconia Daily Sun. Archived from the original on September 24, 2024.
- Sellers, John (October 18, 2024). "Rep. John Sellers: Vote Sellers to reduce taxes, housing regulations". The Laconia Daily Sun.
- Sellers, John (October 25, 2024). "Rep. John Sellers: If Lobbans win this election, they will help destroy the NH Advantage". The Laconia Daily Sun.
- Sellers, John (February 2, 2025). "Opinion: Fundamental truths about life, conception and abortion should be taught in schools". Concord Monitor.

== Electoral history ==
New Hampshire House of Representatives general election for the Grafton 10th district, 2024 Source:
Party	Candidate	Votes	%
Republican	John Sellers	1,490	53.7
Democratic	Richard Lobban	1,284	46.3
Total votes		2,774	100

New Hampshire House of Representatives general election for the Grafton 18th district, 2022 Source:
Party	Candidate	Votes	%
Republican	John Sellers	4,229	50.0
Democratic	Carolyn Fluehr-Lobban	4,225	50.0
Total votes		8,454	100

New Hampshire House of Representatives Republican party primary election for the Grafton 18th district, 2022 Source:
Party	Candidate	Votes	%
Republican	John Sellers	1,103	71.1
Republican	Andrew Ware	448	28.9
Total votes		1,551	100

Bristol Board of Selectmen election, 2017 Source:
Party	Candidate	Votes	%
Nonpartisan	Rick Alpers	238	29.3
Nonpartisan	Donald Milbrand	224	27.5
Nonpartisan	John Sellers	208	25.6
Nonpartisan	Frederick Eichman III	143	17.6
Total votes		813	100
