= Carolyn Fluehr-Lobban =

American anthropologist (born 1945)

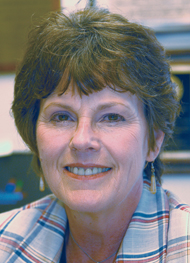
- Carolyn Fluehr-Lobban in 2003
- Born: January 6, 1945 (age 81); Philadelphia, Pennsylvania, U.S.
- Occupations: Anthropologist; author; beekeeper; conservationist; professor; political candidate
- Political party: Democratic
- Spouse: Richard Lobban (m. 1968)

Academic background
- Education: Temple University (BA, MA); Northwestern University (PhD)
- Thesis: An anthropological analysis of homicide in an Afro-Arab State: the Sudan (1973)

Academic work
- Discipline: Anthropology
- Sub-discipline: Cultural relativism
- Institutions: Rhode Island College; Naval War College

Carolyn B. Fluehr-Lobban (/ˈflʌr ˈloʊbən/; née Fluehr; born January 6, 1945) is an American anthropologist, beekeeper, and a co-founder and past president of the Sudan Studies Association. Fluehr-Lobban is a specialist in Islamic law, anthropology and ethics, human rights, cultural relativism and universal rights, and has authored texts books on Islamic societies and on race and racism. She is professor emerita of anthropology at Rhode Island College, in Providence, Rhode Island, and helped start its beekeeping program. Fluehr-Lobban is also a lecturer at the Naval War College, in Newport, Rhode Island. She established a scholarship at Georgia State University where she took her first anthropology course, as well as the scholarships she and her husband established at Temple and Northwestern Universities. She was the secretary of the Rhode Island Beekeepers Society and also lectures on bees and beekeeping. A three-time Democratic party candidate for election to the New Hampshire House of Representatives, she ran unsuccessfully in 2020, lost by four votes in the 2022 general election against John Sellers, and was also unsuccessful in the 2024 general election against Donald McFarlane.

== Life ==
Carolyn Fluehr-Lobban received a Bachelors of Arts degree and a Master of Arts degree in anthropology from Temple University. She received a Doctor of Philosophy degree from Northwestern University in 1973. She is married to the archaeologist Richard Lobban, whom she met in Temple University's Department of Anthropology. Together, they established the Dr. Richard A. Lobban Jr. and Dr. Carolyn B. Fluehr-Lobban Pre-Dissertation Research Award in Anthropology at Temple University.

Fluehr-Lobban and her husband Richard Lobban have helped place 170 acres in permanent watershed protection for Newfound Lake. They have donated to the Lakes Region Conservation Trust and joined some of their neighbors in placing conservation easements on their property.

== Publications ==
=== Books ===
- — (2018). Race and Racism: An Introduction (2 ed.). Rowman & Littlefield. ISBN 9781442274600.
- — (2013). Ethics and Anthropology: Ideas and Practice. AltaMira Press. ISBN 9780759121874.
- — (2012). Shari'a and Islamism in Sudan: Conflict, Law and Social Transformation. London: I. B. Tauris. ISBN 978-1848856660.
- — (2005). Race and Racism: An Introduction. Walnut Creek, CA: Altamira.
- Fluehr-Lobban (2004). Introduction. The Equality of the Human Races: Positivist Anthropology. By Firmin, Anténor. Translated by Charles, Asselin. University of Illinois Press. ISBN 9780252071027.
- — (2004). Race and Identity in the Nile Valley: Ancient and Modern Perspectives. Red Sea Press. ISBN 9781569021798.
- — (2002). Fluehr-Lobban, Carolyn (ed.). Against Islamic Extremism, the writings of Muhammad Said Ashmawy. Gainesville, FL: University Press of Florida. ISBN 978-0813015460.
- — (1994). Islamic Society in Practice. Gainesville, FL: University Press of Florida. ISBN 978-0813013190.
- — (1991). Ethics and the Profession of Anthropology: Dialogue for a New Era. Philadelphia: University of Pennsylvania Press.
- — (1990). Modern Egypt and Its Heritage (Carnegie Museum). University of Pennsylvania Press. ISBN 9780911239133.
- — (1987). Islamic Law and Society in the Sudan. London: Frank Cass. ISBN 978-0-7146-3280-3.

As editor

- — (2002). Ethics and the Profession of Anthropology: Dialogue for Ethically Conscious Practice (2 ed.). Walnut Creek, CA: Rowman Altamira. ISBN 978-0759103375.
- Fluehr-Lobban, Carolyn, ed. (1989). International Perspectives on Marxist Anthropology. Mep Pubns. ISBN 9780930656577.

As co-editor

- — (2013). Historical Dictionary of the Sudan (4 ed.). Scarecrow Press. ISBN 978-0810861800.

=== Articles ===
==== Academic ====
- — (2009). "Guiding Principles over Enforceable Standards". Anthropology News. 50 (6): 8–9. doi:10.1111/j.1556-3502.2009.50608.x.
- — (2008). "Collaborative Anthropology as Twenty-first-Century Ethical Anthropology". Collaborative Anthropologies. 1: 175–182. doi:10.1353/cla.0.0000. S2CID 145444326.
- — (2008). "Anthropology and ethics in America's declining imperial age". Anthropology Today. 24 (4): 18–22. doi:10.1111/j.1467-8322.2008.00601.x.
- — (2006). "Ethical Challenges, New and Old In National Security and the Global War on Terror". Anthropology News. 47 (3): 5. doi:10.1525/an.2006.47.3.5.
- — (2000). "Antenor Firmin: Haitian Pioneer of Anthropology". American Anthropologist. 102 (3): 449–466. JSTOR 683404.
- — (1995). "Cultural Relativism and Universal Rights". Chronicle of Higher Education.
- — (1994). "Informed Consent in Anthropological Research: We Are Not Exempt". Human Organization. 53 (1): 1–10. JSTOR 44126554.
- — (1990). "Islamization in Sudan: A Critical Assessment". Middle East Journal. 44 (4): 610–623. JSTOR 4328193.
- — (1979). "A Marxist Reappraisal of the Matriarchate". Current Anthropology. 20 (2): 341–359. JSTOR 2741932.

==== General ====
- — (March 26, 2014). "I Believe in Learning from Bees" (PDF). Rhode Island Public Radio.

== Electoral history ==
New Hampshire House of Representatives primary election for the Grafton 9 district, 2020 Source:
Party	Candidate	Votes	%
Democratic	Catherine Mulholland	645	47
Democratic	Carolyn Fluehr-Lobban	435	31.7
Democratic	Richard Andrew Lobban Jr.	278	20.3
Democratic	Other	13	1
Total votes		1,371	100

New Hampshire House of Representatives general election for the Grafton 9 district, 2020 Source:
Party	Candidate	Votes	%
Republican	Ned Gordon	3,507	36.2
Republican	Lex Berezhny	2,316	23.9
Democratic	Catherine Mulholland	2,007	20.7
Democratic	Carolyn Fluehr-Lobban	1,826	18.9
	Other	28	0.3
Total votes		9,684	100

New Hampshire House of Representatives general election for the Grafton 18 district, 2022 Source:
Party	Candidate	Votes	%
Republican	John Sellers	4,229	50.0
Democratic	Carolyn Fluehr-Lobban	4,225	50.0
Total votes		8,454	100

New Hampshire House of Representatives general election for the Grafton 18 district, 2024 Source:
Party	Candidate	Votes	%
Republican	Donald McFarlane	5,533	52.2
Democratic	Carolyn Fluehr-Lobban	5,070	47.8
Total votes		10,603	100
