= Gawain Westray Bell =

British colonial administrator in Africa (1909–1995)

Sir Gawain Bell KCMG CBE
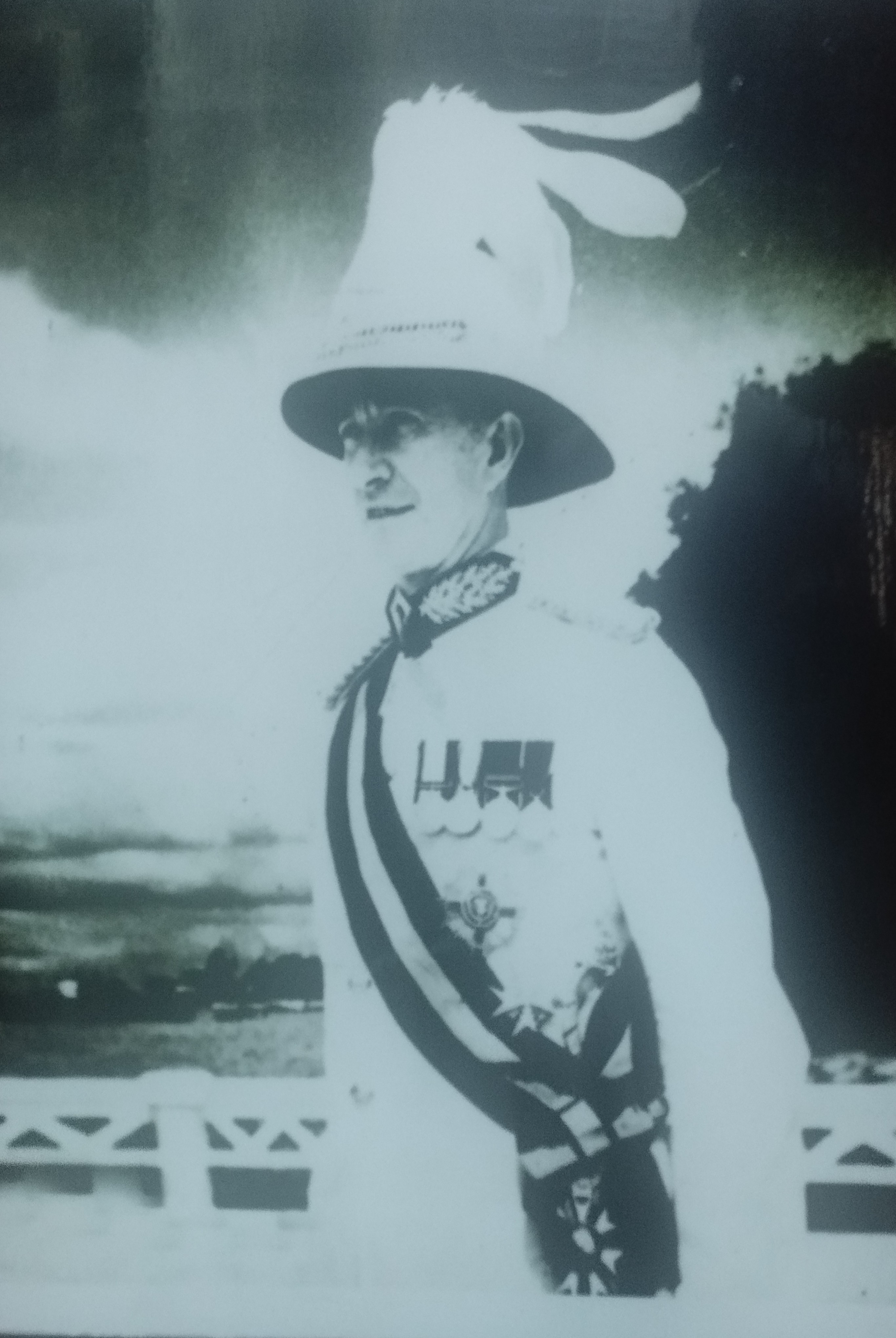
- Sir Gawain Bell

Governor of Northern Nigeria
- In office 2 December 1957 – 1962
- Preceded by: Sir Bryan Sharwood-Smith
- Succeeded by: Alhaji Sir Kashim Ibrahim

Personal details
- Born: 21 January 1909 Cape Town, South Africa
- Died: 26 July 1995 (aged 86)

Sir Gawain Westray Bell KCMG CBE (21 January 1909 – 26 July 1995) was a British colonial administrator who became the Governor of Northern Nigeria.

== Early life ==
Bell was born in Cape Town, South Africa to an executive of the New Zealand Shipping Company. At 10, his family moved back to Cumberland, England where he attended the Dragon School, Oxford, Winchester College and Hertford College, Oxford.

== Sudan, Palestine, and World War II ==
In 1931, Bell entered the Sudan Political Service, where he learned Arabic. His postings included Eastern Sudan, the Nuba Mountains, and Kurdofan.

In 1938, Bell was seconded to the Government of Palestine where he worked with the police in Gaza. He eventually became commander of the Beersheba Camel Gendarmerie.

Bell volunteered for service in the Second World War. Bell rode horseback with an irregular force of Druze cavalry, and participated in the capture of Suweida from the Vichy French. He became a regiment leader of the Arab Legion and was appointed MBE (military) in the 1942 New Year Honours. In 1945, he married Silvia Cornwell-Clyne.

Following the war, Bell returned to Khartoum, Sudan where he became Deputy Civil Secretary and later Permanent Under Secretary to the Ministry of the Interior. He left Sudan in 1955 to become the British Political Agent in Kuwait during the Suez Crisis.

== Nigeria ==
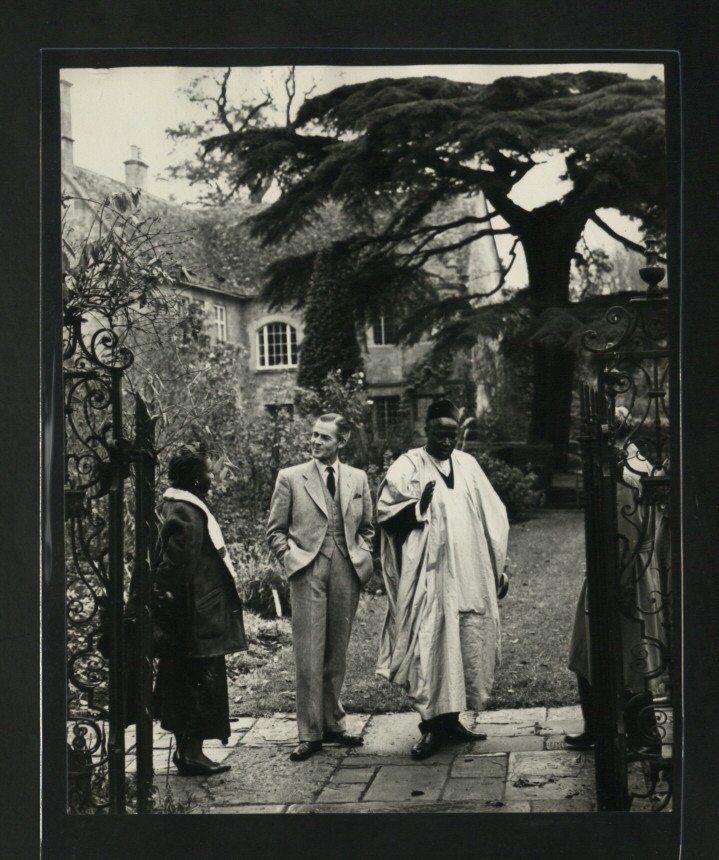
Gawain Westray Bell with his successor Kashim Ibrahim in the gardens of Hidcote Bartrim Manor

In 1957 the Colonial Office recruited Bell to become the Governor of Northern Nigeria, where he worked closely with Sir Ahmadu Bello, the Sardauna of Sokoto. Bello was regarded by the British as difficult to work with; Bell came to his new job with an open mind and won over Bello to the point that he was asked to remain in his post as governor after Nigeria gained its independence from the United Kingdom. He stepped down as governor in 1962.

== Later life ==
Bell worked on several political projects in the Middle East following his time in Nigeria. He worked with Sir Ralph Hone on a constitution for the Federation of South Arabia, and additional projects in the Trucial States and Oman. From 1966 until 1970 he was the last European Secretary-General of the South Pacific Commission (now called the Secretariat of the Pacific Community.

After retiring in 1970, he concentrated on voluntary and charity work. He served as vice president and later chairman of LEPRA, and served on the governing board of the School of Oriental and African Studies at the University of London. He was also the first President of the Society for the Study of the Sudans UK

He published two volumes of memoirs. The first, "Shadows on the Sand", was published in 1984 and covers his life through his time in the Sudan. The second, "An Imperial Twilight", details his five years in Nigeria, as well as his time in Arabia.

== Awards and decorations ==
- Member of the Order of the British Empire (Military Division; 1942)
- Commander of the Order of the British Empire (1955)
- Knight Commander of the Order of St Michael and St George (1957)
- Knight of the Order of St John (1959)

| Region | Period | Governor | Premier | Notes |
|---|---|---|---|---|
| Eastern Region | Oct 1960 - Jan 1966 | Francis Akanu Ibiam | Michael Okpara | |
| Mid-Western Region | Aug 1963 - Feb 1964 | Dennis Osadebay | Dennis Osadebay (Administrator) | Region created from part of Western Region on 8 August 1963 |
| Mid-Western Region | Feb 1964 - Jan 1966 | Jereton Mariere | Dennis Osadebay | |
| Northern Region | Oct 1960 - 1962 | Gawain Westray Bell | Ahmadu Bello | |
| Northern Region | 1962 - Jan 1966 | Kashim Ibrahim | Ahmadu Bello | |
| Western Region | Oct 1960 - May 1962 | Adesoji Aderemi | Samuel Ladoke Akintola | |
| Western Region | May 1962 - Dec 1962 | Adesoji Aderemi | Moses Majekodunmi (Administrator) | Administrator appointed during political crisis |
| Western Region | Jan 1963 - Jan 1966 | Joseph Fadahunsi | Samuel Akintola | |
