= Jeff Shackett =

American politician

Member of New Hampshire House of Representatives for Grafton 9
- In office 2010 – February 22, 2017
- Succeeded by: Vincent Migliore

Personal details
- Party: Republican

Jeffrey S. "Jeff" Shackett is an American politician. He was a member of the New Hampshire House of Representatives and represented Grafton's 9th district.

Shackett resigned from the state house on February 22, 2017.
