= Timothy Josephson =

American politician

Member of the New Hampshire House of Representatives from the Grafton 11th district
- In office December 7, 2016 – December 2, 2020
- Preceded by: Chuck Townsend
- Succeeded by: Beth Folsom

Personal details
- Party: Democratic
- Education: Johnson State College; Norwich University

Timothy Josephson is a former member of the New Hampshire House of Representatives.

== Education ==
Josephson earned a B.A. in liberal arts from Johnson State College and a master's degree in public administration from Norwich University.

== Career ==
Josephson serves as chair of the Mascoma Valley Regional School District. On November 8, 2016, Josephson was elected to the New Hampshire House of Representatives where he represented the Grafton 11 district. He held office from December 7, 2016, to December 2, 2020. He is a Democrat.

== Personal life ==
Josephson resides in Canaan, New Hampshire. Josephson is married and has two children. Josephson is an Eagle Scout.
