= Kashim Ibrahim =

Nigerian politician

Sir Kashim Ibrahim KCMG CBE
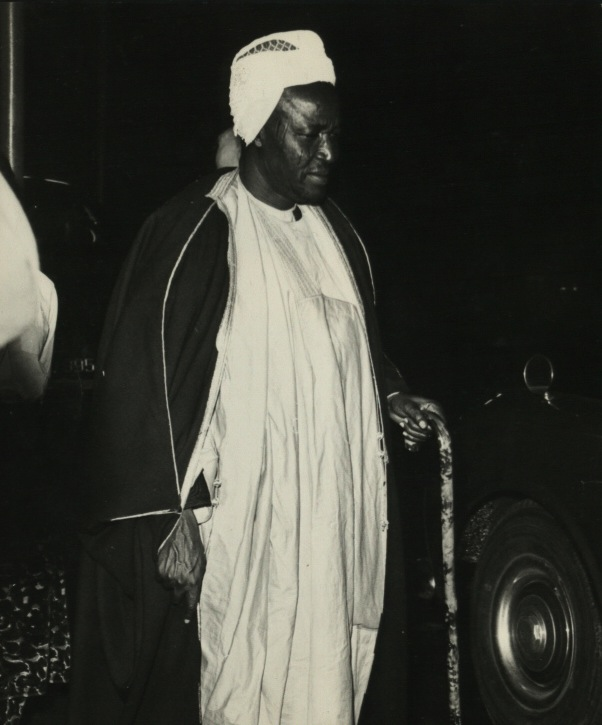

Governor of Northern Nigeria
- In office 1962 – 16 January 1966
- Premier: Ahmadu Bello
- Preceded by: Sir Gawain Westray Bell
- Succeeded by: Hassan Usman Katsina

Minister for Education
- In office 1953–1955

Regional Minister for Survey
- In office 1955–1956

Waziri of Borno
- In office 1956–1990
- Preceded by: Waziri Wali

Minister for Social Services
- In office 1952–1953

Personal details
- Born: 10 June 1910 Maiduguri, Northern Nigeria Protectorate
- Died: 25 July 1990 (aged 80) Maiduguri, Borno State, Nigeria
- Party: Northern People's Congress
- Profession: Teacher

Sir Shettima Kashim Ibrahim, KCMG CBE (10 June 1910 – 25 July 1990) was a Nigerian politician who was head of the Native Administration in Borno State and was a minister for Social Services in the 1950s. He held the traditional title of the Waziri of the Emirate of Borno after two previous Waziris had been forced to resign as a result of scandals in the Borno local administration.

He was a close associate of Sir Ahmadu Bello.

== Life ==
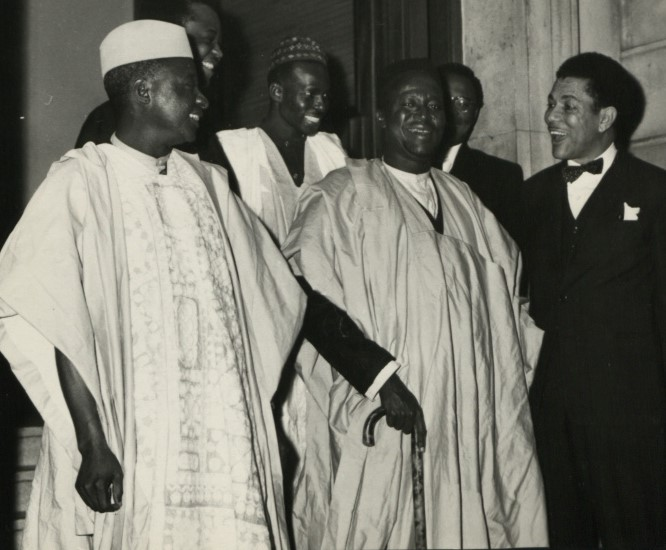
On the steps of Nigeria House in London, Alhaji Sa'adu Alanamu (Agent General, Northern Nigeria), Sir Kashim Ibrahim, KBE (As Governor, Northern Nigeria) and Chief Arthur Prest during Sir Kashim Ibrahim's visit to the Nigeria House

Ibrahim was born in Gargar Ward, Yerwa to the family of Ibrahim Lakanmi. He started his education learning Arabic and Quran before attending Borno Provincial School in 1922. In 1925, he was admitted into the Katsina Training College and finished his studies with a teacher's certificate in 1929. He started working as a teacher in 1929 at the Borno Middle School and by 1933, he had become a Provincial Visiting Teacher. He was later promoted to a Senior Visiting Teacher and education officer for the province of Borno. He was conferred with the title of Shettima of Borno in 1935 and for a while he was known as Shettima Kashim. He joined politics in 1951–52, when he was elected into the Northern Regional Assembly, he was nominated from the North as a cabinet nominee. Thereafter, he was appointed the Federal minister for Social Services and later that of Education.

In 1956, he was appointed as the Waziri of Borno by the Shehu. Waziri Ibrahim became the Governor of the Northern region in 1962, holding office until the military coup of 16 January 1966 that brought Major General Johnson Aguiyi-Ironsi to power. He was appointed a CBE in 1960 and knighted as a KCMG in 1962.

Region	Period	Governor	Premier	Notes
Eastern Region	Oct 1960 - Jan 1966	Francis Akanu Ibiam	Michael Okpara	
Mid-Western Region	Aug 1963 - Feb 1964	Dennis Osadebay	Dennis Osadebay (Administrator)	Region created from part of Western Region on 8 August 1963
Mid-Western Region	Feb 1964 - Jan 1966	Jereton Mariere	Dennis Osadebay	
Northern Region	Oct 1960 - 1962	Gawain Westray Bell	Ahmadu Bello	
Northern Region	1962 - Jan 1966	Kashim Ibrahim	Ahmadu Bello	
Western Region	Oct 1960 - May 1962	Adesoji Aderemi	Samuel Ladoke Akintola	
Western Region	May 1962 - Dec 1962	Adesoji Aderemi	Moses Majekodunmi (Administrator)	Administrator appointed during political crisis
Western Region	Jan 1963 - Jan 1966	Joseph Fadahunsi	Samuel Akintola	
