= Thomas Oppel =

American politician

Member of the New Hampshire House of Representatives from the Grafton 9th district
- In office December 4, 2024 – August 3, 2026
- Preceded by: Corinne Morse
- Succeeded by: Ella Barrett

Personal details
- Born: Thomas Patrick Oppel; December 1953 (age 72)
- Party: Democratic
- Spouse: Myra Humphries
- Children: 3
- Education: Seton Hall University; Dartmouth College
- Profession: Consultant; journalist; politician

Thomas Patrick Oppel (born December 1953) is an American politician, consultant, and former journalist. He is a former member of the New Hampshire House of Representatives from the Grafton 9th district and represented Canaan, Dorchester, and Orange. A resident of Canaan, New Hampshire, since 2000, Oppel is the chair of the Canaan Economic Development Committee. In 2021, Oppel became the secretary of the Canaan Planning Board and his term as secretary was set to expire in 2027, although as of 2026 he is no longer the secretary or a member of the board. He was previously a board member of the Canaan Planning Board from 2005 to 2007.

== Biography ==
Oppel received a bachelor's degree in English literature from Seton Hall University with a minor in psychology and a teaching certificate in secondary education. He later attended Dartmouth College. He taught as an English teacher in Hudson, New Hampshire. Oppel began his career as a journalist as a part-time political correspondent for The Nashua Telegraph. He worked for United Press International and several newspapers in New England and the South. He was the press secretary for Mike Espy's successful congressional campaign. Before founding his own communications firm in 2003, Oppel was a partner in a Washington-based media consulting firm. Oppel was the chief of staff to Ray Mabus, the United States Secretary of the Navy during President Barack Obama's administration. Oppel defeated Kevin Howard in the 2024 New Hampshire House of Representatives election for the Grafton 9th district. He resigned his seat in the New Hampshire House of Representatives on August 3, 2026.

== Political positions ==
While a candidate, Oppel was opposed to the establishment of a state income tax and sales tax. After his election, Oppel has supported the "3-3 Tax Savings Plan," which, if passed by the legislature, would create a 3% income tax for all New Hampshire residents and a $3 tax per $1,000 of equalized property value that would not apply to the first $250,000 of property value for New Hampshire homeowners.

== Electoral history ==
New Hampshire House of Representatives general election for the Grafton 9th district, 2024 Source:
Party	Candidate	Votes	%
Democratic	Thomas Oppel	1,305	51.4
Republican	Kevin Howard	1,233	48.6
Total votes		2,538	100

New Hampshire House of Representatives
Preceded by Corinne Morse	Member of the New Hampshire House of Representatives from the Grafton 9th district (Canaan); 2024–2026	Succeeded by Vacant
