= Marc Bourassa =

American politician

Member-elect of the New Hampshire House of Representatives from the Grafton 10th district
- Assuming office December 2026
- Succeeding: John Sellers

Personal details
- Party: Democratic

Marc Bourassa is an American politician. A member of the Democratic Party, he is the member-elect for the Grafton 10th district of the New Hampshire House of Representatives.
