= Richard Lobban =

American anthropologist and archaeologist (born 1943)

Richard A. Lobban
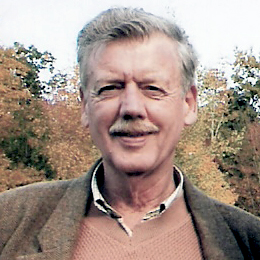
- Richard A. Lobban Jr. in 2008
- Born: Richard Andrew Lobban Jr. November 3, 1943 (age 82)
- Political party: Democratic
- Spouse: Carolyn Fluehr-Lobban (m. 1968)
- Children: 2

Academic background
- Education: Bucknell University (BS); Temple University (MA); Northwestern University (PhD)
- Thesis: Social Networks in the Urban Sudan (1973)

Academic work
- Discipline: Anthropology; archaeology
- Sub-discipline: African studies
- Institutions: Dartmouth College; Carnegie-Mellon University; University of Pittsburgh; Tufts University; University of Khartoum; American University in Cairo; Rhode Island College; Naval War College

Richard Andrew Lobban Jr. (/ˈloʊbən/; born November 3, 1943) is an American anthropologist, archaeologist, Egyptologist, Sudanist, human rights activist, beekeeper, and former war journalist. He is professor emeritus of anthropology and African studies at Rhode Island College, in Providence, Rhode Island, and a lecturer at the Archaeological Institute of America and the Naval War College. He is an expert on Ancient Sudan and Ancient Egypt, with a particular focus on Nubia. He is a co-founder of the Sudan Studies Association.

Lobban is a three-time unsuccessful Democratic party candidate for the New Hampshire General Court. He received the third-most votes in the New Hampshire House of Representatives primary election for the Grafton 9 district in 2020, he was unsuccessful when he ran for New Hampshire's 7th State Senate district against Daniel Innis in 2022, and in 2024 he lost in the general election for the Grafton 10 district against John Sellers.

== Early life and education ==
Richard Andrew Lobban Jr. was born to Dorothy and Richard Andrew Lobban. His parents were supporters of internationalism and African studies. His paternal grandparents were Sarah and James Lobban. James Lobban was a teacher of Greek and Latin.

Lobban graduated from Bucknell University with a Bachelor of Science degree in biology. He received a Master of Arts degree and Doctor of Philosophy degree in anthropology from Temple University and Northwestern University, respectively.

== Career ==
Lobban has taught at Dartmouth College, Carnegie-Mellon University, the University of Pittsburgh, Tufts University, the University of Khartoum, American University in Cairo, Rhode Island College, and the Naval War College. While in Sudan, Lobban discovered a previously unrecorded ancient Meroitic temple believed to have once belonged to a prince. Among items that were discovered was inscriptions of deities such as Hapi and a lintel virtually identical to solar temples dedicated to the god Amun. The temple is believed to have been destroyed during a fourth-century Axumite invasion.

Lobban established the Richard Lobban Family Endowed Lecture in 1999. It is intended to support public presentations on archaeological subjects based upon research on the African continent.

== Publications ==
=== Books ===
Lobban has also authored numerous books and publications such as the Historical Dictionary of Ancient and Medieval Nubia, Historical Dictionary of Sudan (2002), and Social Networks in Urban Sudan (1973). He has also authored/co-authored books such as Historical dictionary of the Republic of Guinea-Bissau (1997), Cape Verde: Crioulo colony to independent nation (1995), Historical dictionary of Cape Verde (2007), and Middle Eastern women and the invisible economy (1998).

Year	Title	Series	Publisher	ISBN
2021	Historical Dictionary of Ancient Nubia	Historical Dictionaries of Ancient Civilizations and Historical Eras	Rowman & Littlefield	978-1-5381-3338-5
2020	Historical Dictionary of Medieval Christian Nubia	Historical Dictionaries of Ancient Civilizations and Historical Eras	Rowman & Littlefield	978-1-5381-3340-8
2017	African Insurgencies: From the Colonial Era to the 21st Century	Praeger Security International	ABC-CLIO, LLC	978-1-4408-3994-8
2014	Libya: History and Revolution	Praeger Security International	ABC-CLIO, LLC	978-1-4408-2884-3

=== Articles ===
- "The Historical Role of the Mahas in the Urbanization of Sudan's 'Three Towns' with Special Reference to Two Communities: Tuti Island and Burri al Mahas". African Urban Notes. VI (2): 24–38. 1971.
- "Eritrean Liberation Front: A Close-Up View". Munger Africana Library Notes. 13 (3): 1–20. 1972.
- "Guinea-Bissau: 24 September 1973 and Beyond". Africa Today. 21 (1): 15–24. Winter 1974. JSTOR 4185637.
- "Alienation, Urbanisation, and Social Networks in the Sudan". The Journal of Modern African Studies. 13 (3): 491–500. 1975. doi:10.1017/S0022278X0005240X. JSTOR 159853.
- "The Eritrean War: Issues and Implications". Canadian Journal of African Studies. 10 (2): 335–346. 1976. doi:10.2307/483836. JSTOR 483836.
- "The Dialectics of Migration and Social Associations in the Urban Sudan". International Journal of Sociology. 7 (2): 99–120. 1977. JSTOR 20629756.
- "Class, Endogamy, and Urbanization in the "Three Towns" of the Sudan". African Studies Review. 22 (3): 99–114. 1979. doi:10.2307/523898. JSTOR 523898.
- "The Law of Elephants and the Justice of Monkeys: Two Cases of Anti-Colonialism in the Sudan". Africa Today. 28 (2): 87–95. 1981. JSTOR 4186003.
- "Class and Kinship in Sudanese Urban Communities". Africa: Journal of the International African Institute. 52 (2): 51–76. 1982. doi:10.2307/1159141. JSTOR 1159141.
- "Pigs and Their Prohibition". International Journal of Middle East Studies. 26 (1): 57–75. 1994. JSTOR 164052.
- "Problems and Strategies in the Decipherment of Meroitic". Northeast African Studies. 1 (2/3): 159–164. 1994. doi:10.1353/nas.1994.0017. JSTOR 41931102.
- "Slavery in the Sudan since 1989". Arab Studies Quarterly. 23 (2): 31–39. 2001. JSTOR 41858372.
- "Was Aesop a Nubian Kummaji (Folkteller)?". Northeast African Studies. 9 (1): 11–31. 2002. JSTOR 41931299.

== Electoral history ==
New Hampshire House of Representatives primary election for the Grafton 9 district, 2020 Source:
Party	Candidate	Votes	%
Democratic	Catherine Mulholland	645	47
Democratic	Carolyn Fluehr-Lobban	435	31.7
Democratic	Richard Lobban	278	20.3
Democratic	Other	13	1
Total votes		1,371	100

New Hampshire Senate general election, 7th District, 2022
Primary election
Party	Candidate	Votes	%
Republican	Daniel Innis	13,413	54.6
Democratic	Richard Lobban	11,146	45.4
Total votes		24,559	100

New Hampshire House of Representatives general election for the Grafton 10 district, 2024 Source:
Party	Candidate	Votes	%
Republican	John Sellers	1,490	53.7
Democratic	Richard Lobban	1,284	46.3
Total votes		2,774	100
