= Ruggles Mine =

Mine in New Hampshire, US

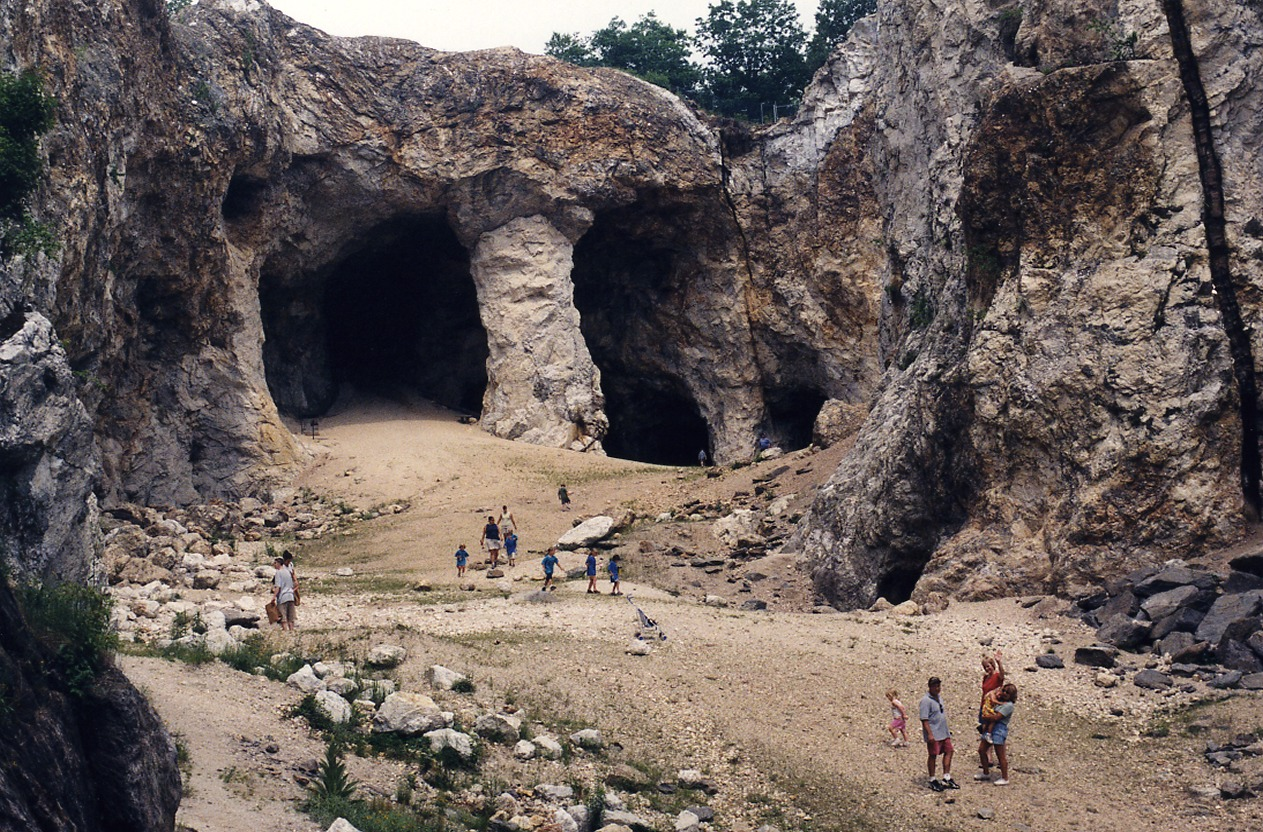
- Inside Ruggles Mine

- Location within New Hampshire
- Location: Grafton, New Hampshire, United States; 43°35′22″N 71°59′32″W
- Products: Mica, feldspar, beryl
- Opened: 1803
- Closed: 1960s

Ruggles Mine is an open-pit mine that was turned into a tourist attraction. It was closed but was sold multiple times and reopened in 2024. The mine is located 40 miles (64 km) northwest of Concord, New Hampshire, in the town of Grafton, a short distance from Route 4 at the village green. The spacious pit includes tunnels and underground chambers, some of which are filled with water. Visitors are allowed to keep any of the various minerals that they find on the mine floor or that can be hammered loose from the walls of the pit.

== Geology ==
The mineral deposits found in the area, known as the Littleton Formation, date from the Devonian period and have been estimated by geologists to be roughly 350 million to 400 million years old. Over 150 minerals have been discovered at the mine, mica being the most prevalent, but also including feldspar, beryl, amethyst, rose/smoky quartz, and garnet. Specimens of the rare uranium minerals, such as uranophane, torbernite, and autunite, have been found.

== History ==
Sam Ruggles (3 August 1770 – 27 May 1843) started the first commercial mica mine in the United States at the site that bears his name. Mica at the time was used to make, among other things, lamp chimneys and stove windows. Ruggles began as a grocer and was merchant of West India goods in Boston, Massachusetts. He was never a resident of New Hampshire (he was born, lived and died in Boston), and hired local workers in Grafton to operate the mine. Local lore states that the mine was started in 1803, but there is no documented evidence that supports the claim. Ruggles' first purchase of property on Isinglass Hill in Grafton was on 5 July 1805. He made subsequent purchases of adjoining properties in 1806 and 1810. His first advertisement for mica ("sheet isinglass") appeared in the Boston Semi-Weekly Advertiser on 9 November 1825. By 1831 his occupation was listed in the Boston Directory as a merchant of sheet isinglass. He had a storefront and warehouse in Boston where he sold mica.

Sam Ruggles sold his mine properties to his son George Haskell Ruggles (1802 – 6 May 1863) in 1834. Sam's son Charles (1809 – 13 April 1869) worked as clerk and bookkeeper for his father and brother. Sam and George managed the business together until Sam's death in 1843, after which George continued the family business on his own. After George's death in 1863, Joseph D. Gould (Sam Ruggles' nephew) was appointed trustee of the estate and managed the mica business until he was removed as trustee by Sam Ruggles' heirs in 1879. Sam Ruggles' grandsons George H., Charles L. and Samuel H. Randall (by Sam's daughter Sarah Ann and Henry Randall) ran the business until 1896 when it was abandoned amid bankruptcy and litigation.

The operation grew over the years—by 1869, more than 26,000 pounds (12,000 kg) a year of mica was being extracted from the mine. The value of the mica mined at Ruggles was estimated to be about $12 million by the 1960s, by which time there were new applications for the mineral in cosmetics, cement block, asphalt roofing, and electrical insulators in appliances such as GE brand toasters. Beginning in 1912, mining began for feldspar, which was used as a nonabrasive scour in the production of china glazes. Later on beryl was also mined.

In 1960, the mine was put up for sale. It was purchased that winter by the Wahlstrom family, who bought it for its well-deserved reputation for top-quality mica. Soon thereafter, however, cheaper sources of mica from foreign suppliers became available and domestic demand correspondingly dropped. The Wahlstrom family decided to turn the mine into a tourist attraction, and in 1963 Ruggles Mine opened to the public.

== Current status ==
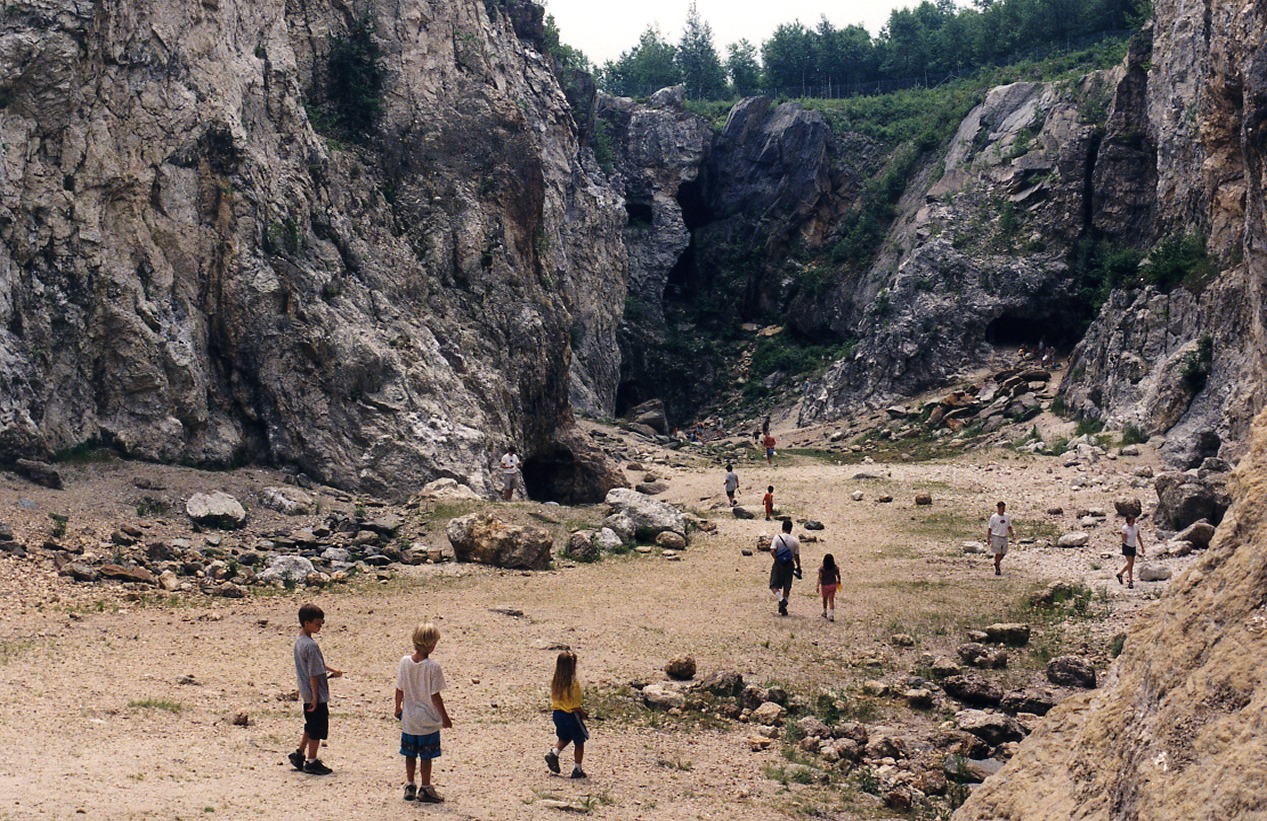
Visitors to the mine

The mine was open to the public from mid-May to mid-October from 1963 through 2015. The mine was closed in 2016 and put up for sale by its owners. In 2018 an online petition was started by a local resident to turn the mine into a New Hampshire state park. The New Hampshire State Park Advisory Council was exploring the issue.

In September 2019, the Searles family, who had bought the mine more than a half century earlier, sold it to Exciglow LLC, which was described as being "affiliated with a production company."

On July 19, 2023, the mine was sold to Joe Bodge, from New Hampshire.

As of June 21, 2024, the mine was reopened to the public under the new ownership.

To reach the mine, the drive up Isinglass Mountain is steep and over meandering back roads. At the top of the mountain, visitors are greeted by a panoramic view stretching for miles. After paying admission and gaining entrance, visitors walk down a steep descent into the mine. Visitors are allowed to keep the minerals that they find, up to a 5 gallon bucket, per person.
