= Society for the Study of the Sudans UK =

- Abbreviation: SSSUK
- Formation: 1986
- Founded at: Durham, England
- Website: www.sssuk.org
- Formerly called: Sudan Studies Society of the United Kingdom

The Society for the Study of the Sudans UK (SSSUK) is the largest UK-based professional association for scholars of Sudan and South Sudan. Founded in 1986, the Society's "overall aim is to promote the study and understanding of the South Sudan and Sudan in all their aspects." It promotes learning and provides resources for anyone with an interest in South Sudan and Sudan. The SSSUK publishes a biannual journal called Sudan Studies.

== History ==
The Sudan Studies Society of the United Kingdom (SSSUK) was established in Durham, England in 1986 by Lesley Forbes (of Durham University), Tony Trilsbach (Durham), G.N. Sanderson, and Peter Woodard. G.N. Sanderson was the first SSSUK chairman. Tony Trilsbach was the society's first secretary (and Editor of Sudan Studies). Sir Gawain Bell, formerly of the Sudan Political Service, was the first President. Many early members of the Society were British scholars or former members of the Anglo-Sudanese Association (ASA), which was made up almost entirely of former officials of the Anglo-Egyptian Sudan. By 1987 there were 300 members, including many English teachers and NGO workers with experience in Sudan.

The Society's first annual symposia were held at the Sudan Cultural Centre in Rutland Gate. More recently, international conferences have been convened in collaboration with the U.S.-based Sudan Studies Association (SSA) in Durham, England (2000), Washington DC (2003), Bergen, Norway (2006), Pretoria (2009) and Bonn (2012).

Sandy Sanderson was the Society's second president, followed by the Sudanese novelist Tayeb Salih.

The name was changed in 2016 to reflect the independence of South Sudan.
