= Vincent Paul Migliore =

American politician

Member of New Hampshire House of Representatives for Grafton 9
- In office September 13, 2017 – May 24, 2020
- Preceded by: Jeff Shackett
- Succeeded by: Lex Berezhny

Personal details
- Died: May 24, 2020 (aged 69)
- Party: Republican

Vincent Paul Migliore (died May 24, 2020) was an American politician. He was a member of the New Hampshire House of Representatives and represented Grafton's 9th district.
