= Robert Hull (New Hampshire politician) =

American politician

Member of the New Hampshire House of Representatives
- In office 2014–2018
- Succeeded by: Ned Gordon
- Constituency: Grafton 9

Personal details
- Party: Republican

Robert P. "Bob" Hull is an American politician from New Hampshire. He served in the New Hampshire House of Representatives.
