= Beth Folsom =

American politician

Member of the New Hampshire House of Representatives from the Grafton 11th district
- In office December 2, 2020 – December 7, 2022
- Preceded by: Timothy Josephson
- Succeeded by: Lex Berezhny

Personal details
- Born: October 12, 1957 (age 68) Bridgeport, Connecticut, U.S.
- Party: Republican

Beth A. Folsom (born October 12, 1957) is a New Hampshire politician.

== Early life ==
Folsom was born in Bridgeport, Connecticut.

== Career ==
On November 3, 2020, Folsom was elected to the New Hampshire House of Representatives seat that represents the Grafton 11 district. She was worn into office on December 2, 2020, as a Republican.

== Personal life ==
Folsom resides in Wentworth, New Hampshire. Folsom is married to Jim, and together they have two children. Folsom is Baptist.
