= Grafton Pond =

Lake in Grafton County, New Hampshire

- Location within New Hampshire Location within the United States
- Location: Grafton County, New Hampshire
- Coordinates: 43°34′42″N 72°2′15″W
- Primary outflows: tributary of Bicknell Brook
- Basin countries: United States
- Max. length: 1.5 mi (2.4 km)
- Max. width: 0.7 mi (1.1 km)
- Surface area: 319 acres (1.3 km^{2})
- Average depth: 13 ft (4.0 m)
- Max. depth: 72 ft (22 m)
- Surface elevation: 1,224 ft (373 m)
- Islands: at least 29
- Settlements: Grafton

Grafton Pond is a 319-acre (1.3 km^{2}) water body located in Grafton County in western New Hampshire, United States, in the town of Grafton. The pond is part of the Mascoma River watershed, flowing to the Connecticut River. Outflow from the pond travels through Bicknell Brook to Crystal Lake in Enfield, then north to the Mascoma River in West Canaan.

Grafton Pond is located within the Society for the Protection of New Hampshire Forests' Grafton Pond Reservation and is an active common loon nesting site. There is a cement dam with a spillway for the pond leading into Bicknell Brook. It is a local favorite for swimming, fishing and boating, although only electric engines are allowed on the pond. No camping or campfires are allowed around the pond or on any of the islands, and it is a "carry in, carry out" area.

The lake is classified as a warmwater fishery, with observed species including smallmouth bass, chain pickerel, yellow perch, sunfish, and brown bullhead, as well as largemouth bass.

== See also ==
- List of lakes in New Hampshire
