= Lex Berezhny =

American politician

Member of the New Hampshire House of Representatives
- Incumbent
- Assumed office December 7, 2022
- Preceded by: Beth A. Folsom
- Succeeded by: Jake Abuhav (elect)
- Constituency: Grafton 11th
- In office December 2, 2020 – December 7, 2022 Serving with Edward "Ned" Gordon
- Preceded by: Vincent Migliore
- Succeeded by: Corinne Morse
- Constituency: Grafton 9th

Personal details
- Born: January 1984 (age 42) Kiev, Ukrainian SSR, Soviet Union (now Kyiv, Ukraine)
- Party: Republican
- Occupation: Politician; software engineer

Lex Berezhny is an American politician and software engineer. A member of the Republican Party, he represents the Grafton 11th district in the New Hampshire House of Representatives.

Berezhny was born in Ukraine and emigrated to Chicago, Illinois, at the age of 7. He spoke out against the Russian invasion of Ukraine shortly after it began in 2022. He supported the comments of the former president of Poland, Lech Wałęsa, about "the unfinished job of defeating Russia" when Wałęsa came to address the New Hampshire House of Representatives in 2022. He is a cosponsor of House Bill 1633 which would legalize the recreational use of cannabis. Berezhny ran unopposed in the 2024 New Hampshire House of Representatives election. He won re-election in 2024.

== Electoral history ==
New Hampshire House of Representatives primary election for the Grafton 9th district, 2020 Source:
| Party | Candidate | Votes | % |
|---|---|---|---|
| Republican | Ned Gordon | 1,175 | 69.2 |
| Republican | Lex Berezhny | 345 | 20.3 |
| Republican | Tejasinha Sivalingam | 166 | 9.8 |
| Republican | Other | 11 | 0.7 |
| Total votes | | 1,697 | 100 |

New Hampshire House of Representatives general election for the Grafton 9th district, 2020 Source:
| Party | Candidate | Votes | % |
|---|---|---|---|
| Republican | Ned Gordon | 3,507 | 36.2 |
| Republican | Lex Berezhny | 2,316 | 23.9 |
| Democratic | Catherine Mulholland | 2,007 | 20.7 |
| Democratic | Carolyn Fluehr-Lobban | 1,826 | 18.9 |
| | Other | 28 | 0.3 |
| Total votes | | 9,684 | 100 |

New Hampshire House of Representatives general election for the Grafton 11th district, 2022 Source:
| Party | Candidate | Votes | % |
|---|---|---|---|
| Republican | Lex Berezhny | 1,264 | 58.2 |
| Democratic | Catherine Mulholland | 905 | 41.7 |
| | Other | 2 | 0.1 |
| Total votes | | 2,171 | 100 |
