= Carroll M. Brown Jr. =

American politician and musician

Member of the New Hampshire House of Representatives from the Grafton 10th district
- In office December 7, 2022 – December 3, 2024
- Preceded by: Roger Dontonville
- Succeeded by: John Sellers

Personal details
- Born: Carroll Myers Brown Jr.
- Party: Republican
- Education: Bridgewater State College (BS)

Carroll Myers Brown Jr. is an American Republican party politician and musician who formerly represented the Grafton 10th district in the New Hampshire House of Representatives. He represented the towns of Bridgewater and Bristol. He assumed office on December 7, 2022, did not run for re-election, and was succeeded by John Sellers in 2024.

Brown is originally from Hampton, New Hampshire, and his parents built Brownie's Motel near the beach. He received a bachelor of science in biology from Bridgewater State College in 1977. and previously worked for the New Hampshire Department of Environmental Services. He was an elected member of the Bristol select board, a member of the Bristol Conservation Commission, and a select board alternative representative on the Bristol Economic Development Committee.

He was opposed to the successful bipartisan bill to ban certain products with intentionally added per- and polyfluoroalkyl substances, known as forever chemicals. A musician, he performs as the Solitary Man.

== Electoral history ==
New Hampshire House of Representatives election for the Grafton 10th district, 2022 general election Source:
Party	Candidate	Votes	%
Republican	Carroll M. Brown Jr.	1,255	59.2
Democratic	Taylor Largmann	863	40.7
Total votes		2,119	100

New Hampshire House of Representatives election for the Grafton 10th district, 2022 primary election Source:
Party	Candidate	Votes	%
Republican	Carroll M. Brown Jr.	351	71.1
Republican	Randall Kelley	216	37.9
Total votes		570	100

New Hampshire House of Representatives
Preceded by Roger Dontonville	Member of the New Hampshire House of Representatives from Grafton 10th District (Bristol); 2022 - 2024	Succeeded by John Sellers
