= Sudan Studies Association =

Sudan oriented learned organization in the US

- جمعية الدراسات السودانية
- Abbreviation: SSA
- Formation: 1981
- Type: non-profit association
- Purpose: Dedicated to the pursuit of knowledge about all aspects of life in Sudan and South Sudan
- President: Dr. Souad T. Ali (Arizona State University)
- Website: www.sudansstudies.org

The Sudan Studies Association (SSA) (Arabic: جمعية الدراسات السودانية) is the US-based professional association for scholars of Sudan and South Sudan, with members from the United States, Canada, Sudan, South Sudan, and elsewhere. The SSA was founded in 1981 to pursue knowledge about all aspects of life in Sudan (and now South Sudan) and to "foster closer ties among scholars in the Sudan, North America, Europe, the Middle East, and elsewhere." The association seeks to promote research about the dynamics that shape Sudan and South Sudan and their relationships with neighboring countries. Conferences are held annually in North America. In addition, international conferences have in recent years been convened in collaboration with the Society for the Study of the Sudans UK (SSSUK) in Durham, England (2000), Washington DC (2003), Bergen, Norway (2006), Pretoria (2009) and Bonn (2012).

== History ==
The SSA emerged from the 1980 meeting of the African Studies Association, where three panels were independently organized on Sudan. The SSA's co-founders, Richard Lobban (the organization's first President) and Carolyn Fluehr-Lobban, gathered the names of scholars interested in forming an Association for the study of Sudan. Notable among those who showed early interest were Dr. Constance E. Berkley of Fordham University and Dr. Jay Spaulding of Kean College of New Jersey (now Kean University), who served as the first Editor and Co-editor, respectively, of SSA publications. Dr. Berkley served as the SSA's first Executive Secretary, and through her close ties with the Cultural Counsellor's office of the Embassy of Sudan in Washington introduced the Lobbans to Syd. Osman Hassan Ahmed, who had also compiled a list of Sudan scholars. Combining their lists, they sent out letters to roughly 70 people, informing them of the immanent formation of the Sudan Studies Association. The first meeting of the Association was held at The George Washington University on February 7, 1981. Thirty-five people attended the inaugural meeting, where officers were appointed, a steering committee formed, and contributions received from attendees, the Ministry of Education in the Sudan, the officer of Sudan's Cultural Counsellor in Washington, as well as Osman Hassan Ahmed and the former Ambassador, Salah Hashim.

== Publications ==
The Association's quarterly publication is the peer-reviewed Bulletin of the Sudan Studies Association (Nashrat Jamʻīyat al-Dirāsāt al-Sūdānīyah, ISSN 1941-3629). The Association occasionally publishes the proceedings of its annual meetings in book form. (Note: see Ali, Souad T.; et al. (2014). The Road to the Two Sudans. Cambridge Scholars. ISBN 978-1443856324.) (Note: see Spaulding, Jay; et al. (2010). Sudan's Wars and Peace Agreements. Cambridge Scholars. ISBN 978-1-4438-2321-0.)
