= Charles E. Sova =

American politician

Member of the New Hampshire House of Representatives
- In office 2000–2002
- Constituency: Grafton 11th
- In office 2010–2012
- Preceded by: Catherine Mulholland
- Succeeded by: Wendy Piper
- Constituency: Grafton 10th

Personal details
- Born: Charles Emil Sova; May 23, 1928 Bridgeport, Connecticut, U.S.
- Died: July 2, 2019 (aged 91)
- Party: Republican
- Education: Fairfield University (BS)

Military service
- Branch/service: U.S. Army

Charles Emil Sova (May 23, 1928 – July 2, 2019) was an American politician. A Republican, he was a member of the New Hampshire House of Representatives from Grafton County who represented the Grafton 11th district from 2000 to 2002, and the 10th district from 2010 to 2012.

Sova attended Fairfield University in Fairfield, Connecticut, and received a Bachelor of Science in mathematics in 1953.

His final run for office was in 2014, when he lost the general election for the Grafton 6th district to Kevin G. Maes.
