= Ella Barrett =

American politician

Member-elect of the New Hampshire House of Representatives from the Grafton 9th district
- Assuming office December 2026
- Succeeding: Thomas Oppel

Personal details
- Party: Democratic

Ella Barrett is an American politician. A member of the Democratic Party, she is the member-elect for the Grafton 9th district of the New Hampshire House of Representatives.
