= Roger Dontonville =

American politician

Member of New Hampshire House of Representatives for Grafton 10
- In office 2016 – December 7, 2022
- Succeeded by: Carroll Brown Jr.

Personal details
- Party: Democratic

Roger W. Dontonville is an American politician. He was a member of the New Hampshire House of Representatives and represented Grafton's 10th district.

Dontonville endorsed the Cory Booker 2020 presidential campaign.
