= Corinne Morse =

American politician

Member of the New Hampshire House of Representatives from the Grafton 9th district
- In office December 7, 2022 – December 2024
- Preceded by: Edward "Ned" Gordon; Lex Berezhny
- Succeeded by: Thomas Oppel

Personal details
- Born: January 1981 (age 45)
- Party: Democratic

Corinne Marie Morse is an American former politician. She was a Democratic member of the New Hampshire House of Representatives from the Grafton 9th district from 2022 to 2024. She was a member of the New Hampshire House Environment and Agriculture Standing Committee.

Morse has lived in Canaan, New Hampshire, since 2018. She was a member of the Canaan Elementary School PTA and the Canaan Planning Board with a term that was set to expire in 2026, although as of 2025 she is no longer a member of the planning board.

Morse served as the treasurer for Karen Liot Hill's successful campaign to replace Cinde Warmington on the Executive Council of New Hampshire. Campaign documents that were filed and signed by Morse in campaign expense reports included home cleaning, home heating oil, and more than $15,000 in gas and meals expenses, all with what appeared to be Morse's signature. Two "mysterious" checks included in the report filed by Morse totaling $1,350 appeared to correspond with two court cases against Liot Hill. Liot Hill later refiled the documents with her own signature and claimed she was the treasurer of her campaign, saying in a statement that "Morse stepped down as treasurer for my campaign after the primary, and the amended reports bear my signature". In the amended report the "mysterious" checks were listed as reimbursements paid to Liot Hill from her campaign for various subscriptions as well as cellular and internet services.
