= Ned Gordon =

American politician

Edward "Ned" Gordon

Member of the New Hampshire Senate from the 2nd district
- In office December 7, 1994 – December 4, 2002
- Preceded by: Wayne D. King
- Succeeded by: Carl R. Johnson

Member of the New Hampshire House of Representatives
- In office December 5, 2018 – December 7, 2022 Serving with Vincent Paul Migliore, Lex Berezhny
- Preceded by: Robert P. "Bob" Hull
- Succeeded by: Corinne Morse
- Constituency: Grafton 9th district
- In office December 2, 1992 – December 7, 1994 Serving with Nils H. Larson
- Preceded by: William J. Driscoll; David O. Dow
- Succeeded by: William Phinney
- Constituency: Grafton 8th district

Personal details
- Born: June 13, 1948 (age 78) Franklin, New Hampshire, U.S.
- Party: Republican
- Spouse: Gayle
- Children: 2
- Education: University of New Hampshire (BA, JD); Boston College (MBA)

Edward "Ned" Gordon (born June 13, 1948) is an American Republican party politician from New Hampshire. He most recently represented the Grafton 9th district in the New Hampshire House of Representatives from 2018 until 2022. Previously, he served one term in the state house and four terms in the New Hampshire Senate. Gordon was a Circuit Court Judge in the New Hampshire Court System from 2005 to 2018.

He has Bachelor of Arts and Juris Doctor degrees from the University of New Hampshire, and an Master of Business Administration degree from Boston College. He is a resident of Bristol and lives there with his wife, Gayle. He has served as Town Moderator of Bristol, New Hampshire, since 1994.

New Hampshire Senate
Preceded by Wayne D. King	Member of the New Hampshire Senate from the 2nd district 1994–2002	Succeeded by Carl R. Johnson
New Hampshire House of Representatives
Preceded by William J. Driscoll; David O. Dow	Member of the New Hampshire House of Representatives from the Grafton 8th district 1992–1994; Served alongside: Nils H. Larson	Succeeded by William Phinney
Preceded by Robert P. "Bob" Hull	Member of the New Hampshire House of Representatives from the Grafton 9th district 2018–2022; Served alongside: Vincent Paul Migliore, Lex Berezhny	Succeeded by Corinne Morse
