= Grafton, New Hampshire =

- Town
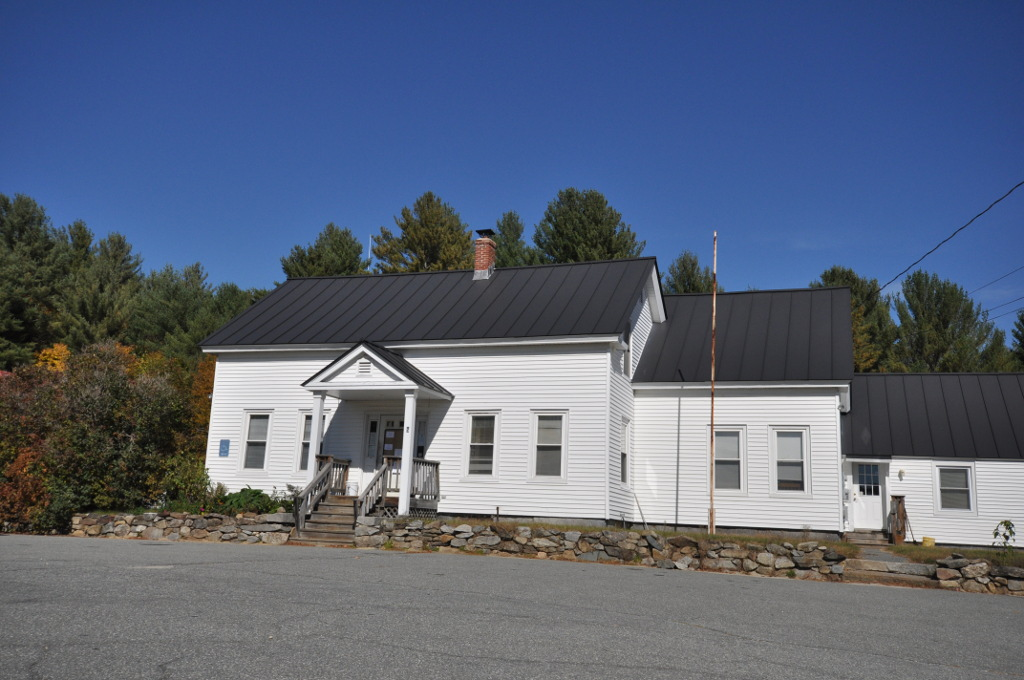
- Town hall

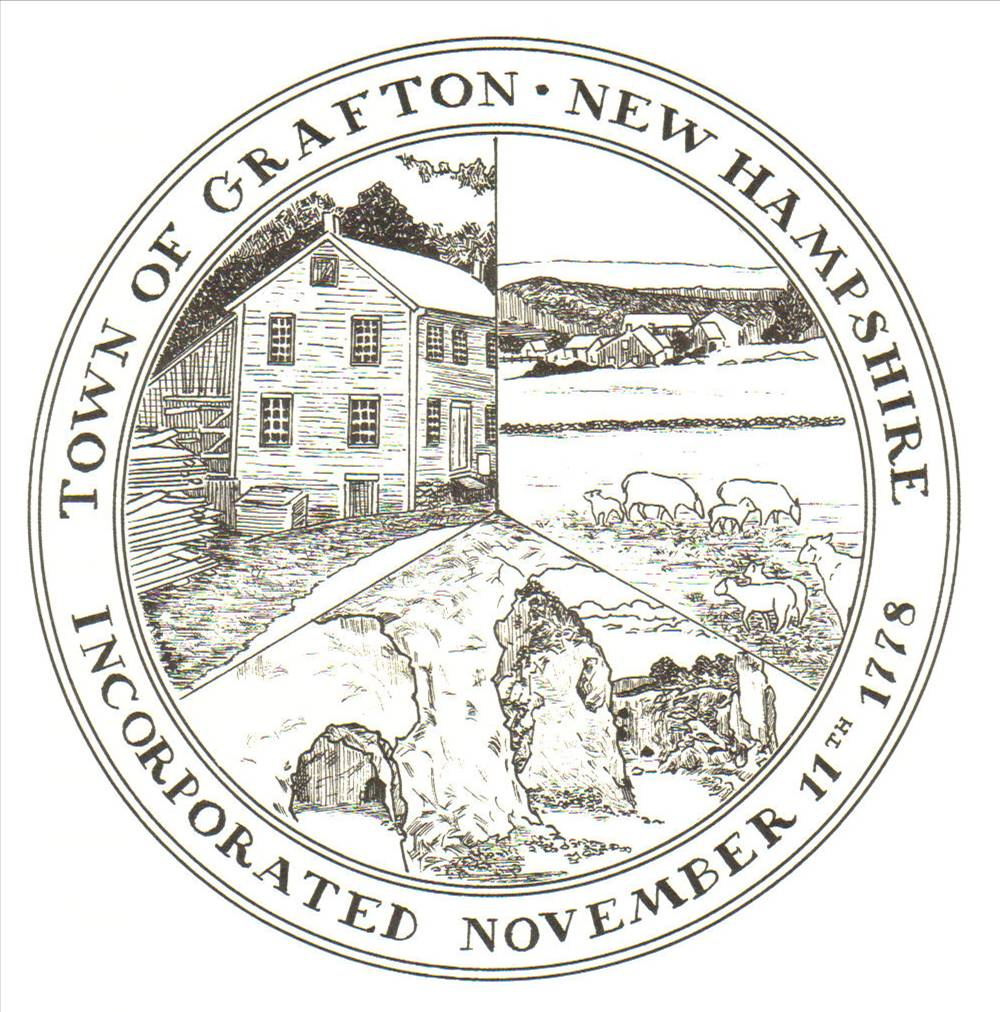
- Seal

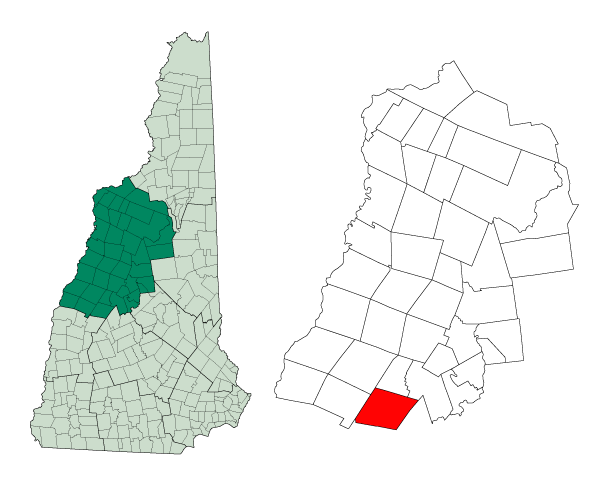
- Location in Grafton County, New Hampshire
- Coordinates: 43°34′33″N 71°58′20″W
- Country: United States
- State: New Hampshire
- County: Grafton
- Incorporated: 1778
- Villages: Grafton; Grafton Center; East Grafton

Government
  - Board of Selectmen: Leif Hogue, Chair; Steve Darrow; Edward Grinley

Area
  - Total: 42.4 sq mi (109.8 km^{2})
  - Land: 41.5 sq mi (107.4 km^{2})
  - Water: 0.93 sq mi (2.4 km^{2}) 2.20%
- Elevation: 919 ft (280 m)

Population (2020)
  - Total: 1,385
  - Density: 33/sq mi (12.9/km^{2})
- Time zone: UTC-5 (Eastern)
  - Summer (DST): UTC-4 (Eastern)
- ZIP code: 03240
- Area code: 603
- FIPS code: 33-30820
- GNIS feature ID: 873609
- Website: www.townofgraftonnh.com

Grafton is a town in Grafton County, New Hampshire, United States. The population was 1,385 at the 2020 census.

== History ==
Originally granted in 1761, and re-granted in 1769, Grafton, like its county, takes its name from Augustus FitzRoy, 3rd Duke of Grafton, a relative of colonial governor Benning Wentworth. Grafton was incorporated in 1778.

Historically, Grafton's economic base consisted of subsistence farming, small-scale industry, and mining. Several mica mines and granite quarries once dotted the town's landscape, most notably Ruggles Mine.

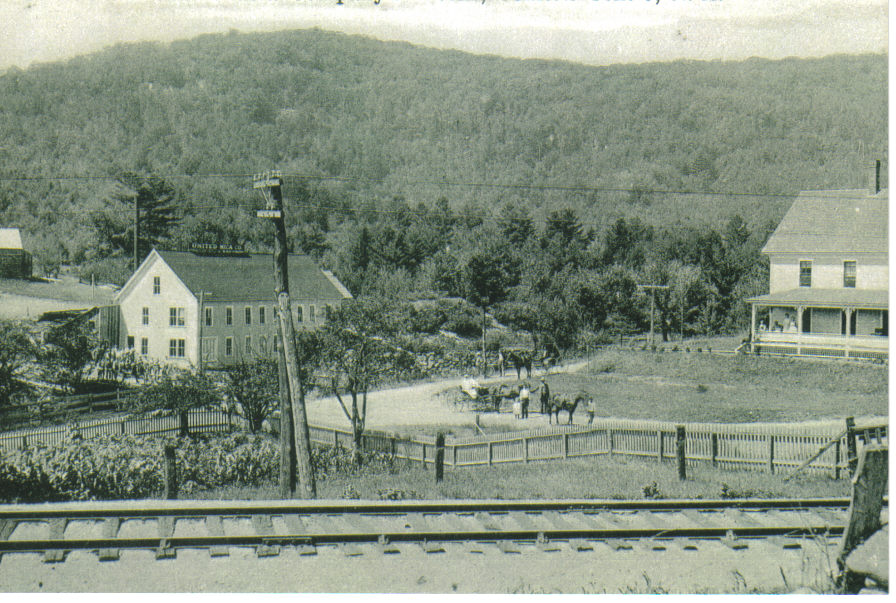
The United Mica Company operated this mill between 1909 and 1916. Image c. 1909

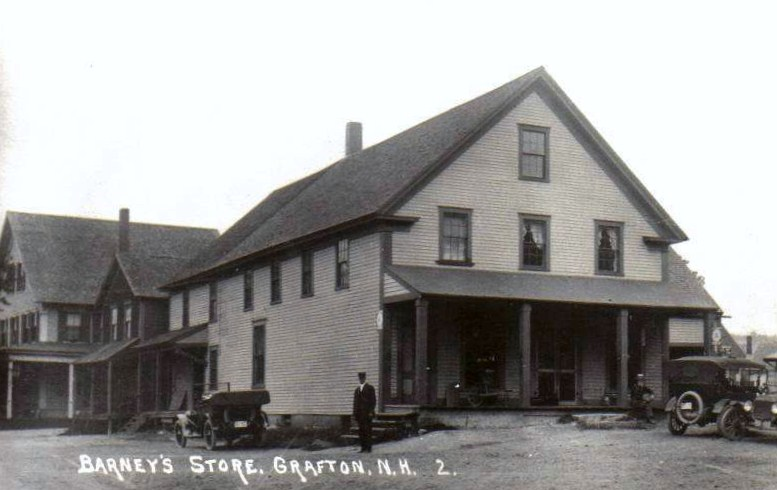
In continuous operation since the 1840s, this store is now known as the Grafton Country Store. Image c. 1919.

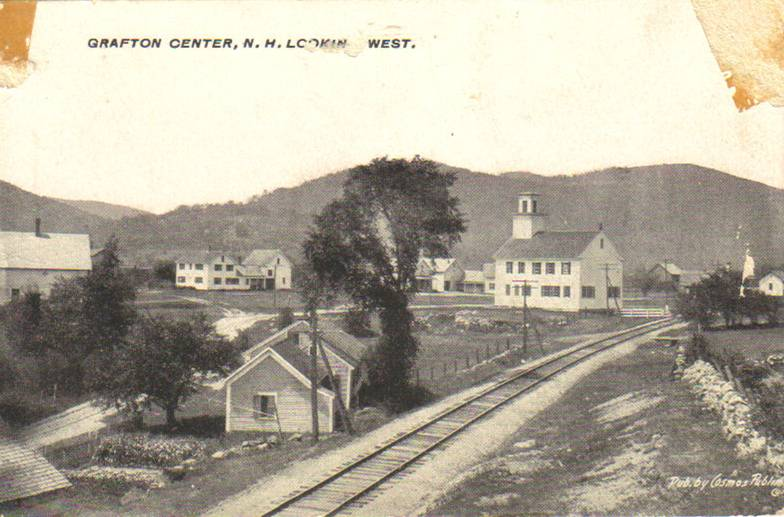
Grafton Center c. 1909

== Geography ==
The town is in western New Hampshire, on the southern edge of Grafton County. It is bordered to the south by Sullivan County and to the southeast by Merrimack County. U.S. Route 4 is the main road through the town, leading southeast to Andover and Concord and northwest to Canaan and Lebanon. New Hampshire Route 4A crosses the southwest corner of the town.

According to the U.S. Census Bureau, the town has a total area of 42.4 square miles (109.8 km^{2}), of which 41.5 square miles (107.4 km^{2}) are land and 0.93 square miles (2.4 km^{2}) are water, comprising 2.20% of the town. The majority of the town is drained to the east by the Smith River, a tributary of the Pemigewasset River and part of the Merrimack River watershed, while the western side of the town drains by several brooks toward the Mascoma River, a tributary of the Connecticut. The highest point in Grafton is the summit of Melvin Mountain, at 2,177 feet (664 m) above sea level in the northeastern part of town. Grafton Pond is in the western part of town.

=== Climate ===
Climate data for Grafton, 1991–2020 normals, 1893-2020 extremes: 830ft (253m)
Month	Jan	Feb	Mar	Apr	May	Jun	Jul	Aug	Sep	Oct	Nov	Dec	Year
Record high °F (°C)	60 (16)	64 (18)	80 (27)	92 (33)	95 (35)	99 (37)	99 (37)	97 (36)	95 (35)	86 (30)	74 (23)	70 (21)	99 (37)
Mean maximum °F (°C)	48.5 (9.2)	51.8 (11.0)	63.5 (17.5)	77.3 (25.2)	84.8 (29.3)	88.8 (31.6)	90.7 (32.6)	88.4 (31.3)	83.8 (28.8)	75.8 (24.3)	66.3 (19.1)	51.5 (10.8)	92.0 (33.3)
Mean daily maximum °F (°C)	29.1 (−1.6)	31.9 (−0.1)	40.2 (4.6)	54.3 (12.4)	65.7 (18.7)	75.2 (24.0)	79.5 (26.4)	77.8 (25.4)	70.8 (21.6)	58.0 (14.4)	45.4 (7.4)	34.0 (1.1)	55.2 (12.9)
Daily mean °F (°C)	18.2 (−7.7)	19.6 (−6.9)	28.6 (−1.9)	41.3 (5.2)	52.8 (11.6)	62.4 (16.9)	66.8 (19.3)	65.5 (18.6)	57.7 (14.3)	45.4 (7.4)	35.3 (1.8)	24.5 (−4.2)	43.2 (6.2)
Mean daily minimum °F (°C)	7.2 (−13.8)	7.2 (−13.8)	17.1 (−8.3)	28.3 (−2.1)	39.9 (4.4)	49.5 (9.7)	54.1 (12.3)	53.2 (11.8)	44.7 (7.1)	32.8 (0.4)	25.3 (−3.7)	15.0 (−9.4)	31.2 (−0.5)
Mean minimum °F (°C)	−18.7 (−28.2)	−17.7 (−27.6)	−8.2 (−22.3)	15.2 (−9.3)	24.2 (−4.3)	32.2 (0.1)	39.2 (4.0)	36.1 (2.3)	27.3 (−2.6)	17.2 (−8.2)	7.5 (−13.6)	−8.0 (−22.2)	−20.9 (−29.4)
Record low °F (°C)	−40 (−40)	−36 (−38)	−25 (−32)	−6 (−21)	14 (−10)	25 (−4)	30 (−1)	26 (−3)	16 (−9)	9 (−13)	−6 (−21)	−30 (−34)	−40 (−40)
Average precipitation inches (mm)	2.93 (74)	2.55 (65)	3.05 (77)	3.20 (81)	3.18 (81)	4.21 (107)	3.89 (99)	3.32 (84)	3.23 (82)	4.51 (115)	3.11 (79)	2.98 (76)	40.16 (1,020)
Average snowfall inches (cm)	22.1 (56)	15.3 (39)	15.5 (39)	5.0 (13)	0.0 (0.0)	0.0 (0.0)	0.0 (0.0)	0.0 (0.0)	0.0 (0.0)	0.4 (1.0)	4.8 (12)	15.6 (40)	78.7 (200)
Source 1: NOAA(1981-2010 Snowfall)
Source 2: XMACIS2 (records & 1981-2010 monthly max/mins)

== Demographics ==
Historical population
Census	Pop.	Note	%±
1790	403		—
1800	682		69.2%
1810	931		36.5%
1820	1,094		17.5%
1830	1,207		10.3%
1840	1,201		−0.5%
1850	1,259		4.8%
1860	1,150		−8.7%
1870	907		−21.1%
1880	934		3.0%
1890	787		−15.7%
1900	748		−5.0%
1910	641		−14.3%
1920	554		−13.6%
1930	539		−2.7%
1940	552		2.4%
1950	442		−19.9%
1960	348		−21.3%
1970	370		6.3%
1980	739		99.7%
1990	923		24.9%
2000	1,138		23.3%
2010	1,340		17.8%
2020	1,385		3.4%
U.S. Decennial Census

As of the census of 2010, there were 1,340 people, 564 households, and 372 families residing in the town. The population density was 32.1 inhabitants per square mile (12.4/km^{2}). There were 839 housing units at an average density of 20.1 per square mile (7.8/km^{2}). The racial makeup of the town was 96.7% White, 0.3% African American, 0.2% Native American, 0.4% Asian, 0.1% some other race, and 2.2% from two or more races. Hispanic or Latino of any race were 1.5% of the population.

There were 564 households, out of which 24.1% had children under the age of 18 living with them, 54.4% were headed by married couples living together, 7.1% had a female householder with no husband present, and 34.0% were non-families. 26.4% of all households were made up of individuals, and 7.4% consisted of someone living alone who was 65 years of age or older. The average household size was 2.38, and the average family size was 2.84.

In the town, the population was spread out, with 18.8% under the age of 18, 5.2% from 18 to 24, 23.7% from 25 to 44, 36.5% from 45 to 64, and 14.6% who were 65 years of age or older. The median age was 45.6 years. For every 100 females, there were 108.7 males. For every 100 females age 18 and over, there were 112.1 males.

At the 2000 census, the median income for a household in the town was $38,654, and the median income for a family was $41,875. Males had a median income of $30,074 versus $23,750 for females. The per capita income for the town was $16,944. About 4.2% of families and 7.9% of the population were below the poverty line, including 10.0% of those under age 18 and 4.1% of those age 65 or over.

== Government ==
Grafton is governed by a three-person select board.

== Politics ==
Grafton County, in which the town of Grafton is located, ranks number 100 in terms of highest property taxes levied in the United States. As of 2019, the town of Grafton itself had the 16th highest property tax rate in the state of New Hampshire.

== Education ==
Grafton is in the Mascoma Valley Regional School District.

== Free Town Project ==
In 2004, Grafton became the focus for libertarians as part of the Free Town Project (a single-town version of the Free State Project). One of the goals was to advocate for legal changes. Grafton's appeal as a favorable destination was due to its absence of zoning laws and a then-low property tax rate. John Babiarz, a Grafton resident and prominent member of the Libertarian Party, encouraged libertarians to move there.

During this time, the town's population grew by about 200 people (about 20%); nearly all of the newcomers were men. Project participants did not find themselves as welcome as they had hoped, but they voted in changes including a 30% reduction in the town's already small budget. This resulted in eliminating funding to the county's senior-citizens council, town offices going unheated during the winter, poorly maintained roads filled with potholes, and the Grafton Police Department being reduced to one officer (the police chief), who said he was unable to answer calls for service as the town had no money to repair the one police vehicle left. Other issues were inconsistent basic public services, such as trash collection. The libertarian newcomers additionally increased the town's costs by filing lawsuits against it in attempts to set legal precedents.

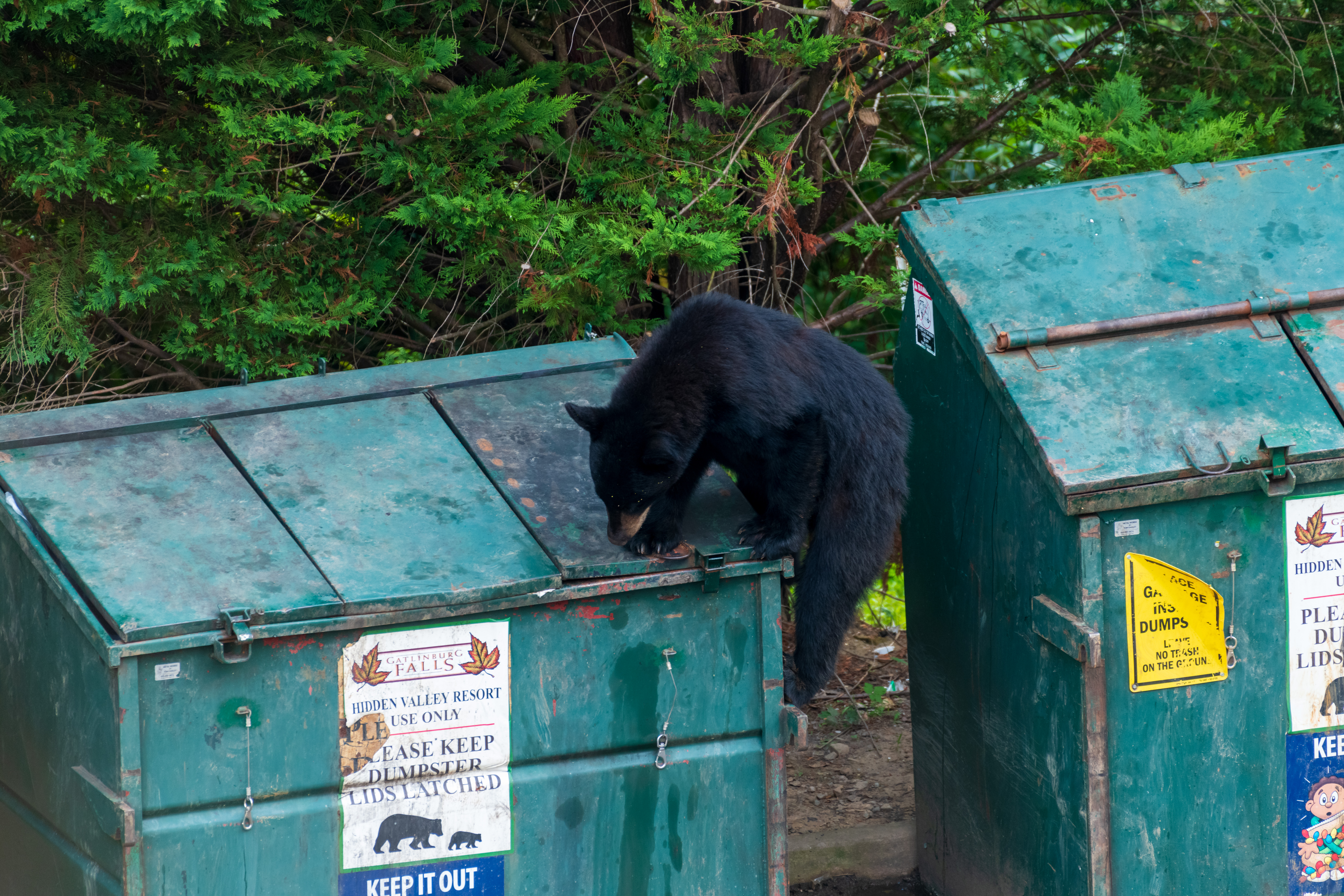
Example of a bear-resistant trash container, with an American black bear climbing on top of it.

The project has been associated with an increase in the number and aggressiveness of black bears in town, including entering homes, mauling people, and eating pets. A single, definitive cause for the abnormal behavior of the bears has not been proven, but it may be due to Grafton residents being reluctant to buy and mandate the use of bear-resistant containers, improper disposal of waste materials (such as feces), or residents feeding bears.

After a rash of lawsuits from Free Towners, an influx of sex offenders, an increase of crime, problems with bold local bears, and the first murders in the town's history, the Libertarian project ended in 2016.

== Notable people ==
- Monroe Heath (1827–1894), mayor of Chicago from 1876 to 1879
- Myra Belle Martin (1861–1936), teacher, writer, financier in late 19th century and early 20th century
- Cyrus A. Sulloway (1839–1917), congressman

== Sites of interest ==
- Ruggles Mine
