= Big River (New Hampshire) =

River in New Hampshire, United States

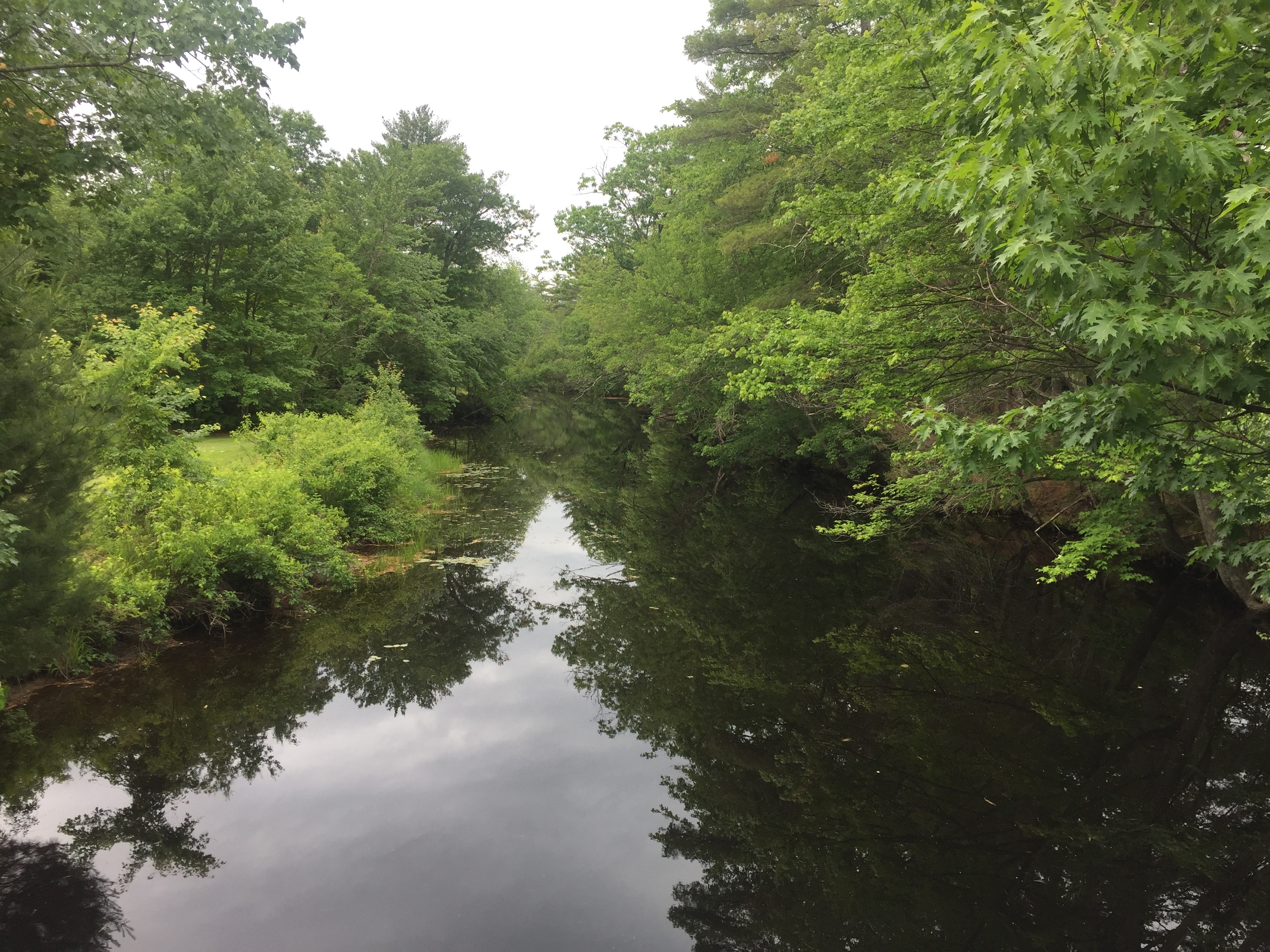
- The Big River in Center Barnstead, NH

- Location within New Hampshire Location within the United States

Location
- Country: United States
- State: New Hampshire
- Counties: Strafford, Belknap
- Towns: New Durham, Strafford, Barnstead

Physical characteristics
- Source: unnamed pond
  - location: New Durham
  - coordinates: 43°21′26″N 71°9′28″W
  - elevation: 831 ft (253 m)
- Mouth: Suncook River
  - location: Barnstead
  - coordinates: 43°20′11″N 71°15′39″W
  - elevation: 490 ft (150 m)
- Length: 14.9 mi (24.0 km)

Basin features
- Tributaries
  - left: Little River

The Big River is a 14.9-mile-long (24.0 km) river located in central New Hampshire in the United States. It is a tributary of the Suncook River, part of the Merrimack River (and therefore Gulf of Maine) watershed.

Headwaters of the Big River rise on high ground in the southern corners of Alton and New Durham, New Hampshire. The river flows southeast into Strafford, then, running up against the Blue Hills Range, the river reverses course, turning west into Barnstead, where it meets the Suncook River in the village of Center Barnstead.

== See also ==
- List of rivers of New Hampshire
