= Holway =

Holway may refer to:

== Places ==
in England

- Holway, Dorset
- Holway, Somerset

in the United States

- Holway, Wisconsin
- Holway Corner, Maine

in Wales

- Holway, Flintshire, in Holywell

== People ==
- Albert Holway, a Canadian professional ice hockey player
- Florence Holway, an American advocate for crime victims
- W. R. Holway, an American civil engineer known for his water projects in Oklahoma
