= Little River (Big River tributary) =

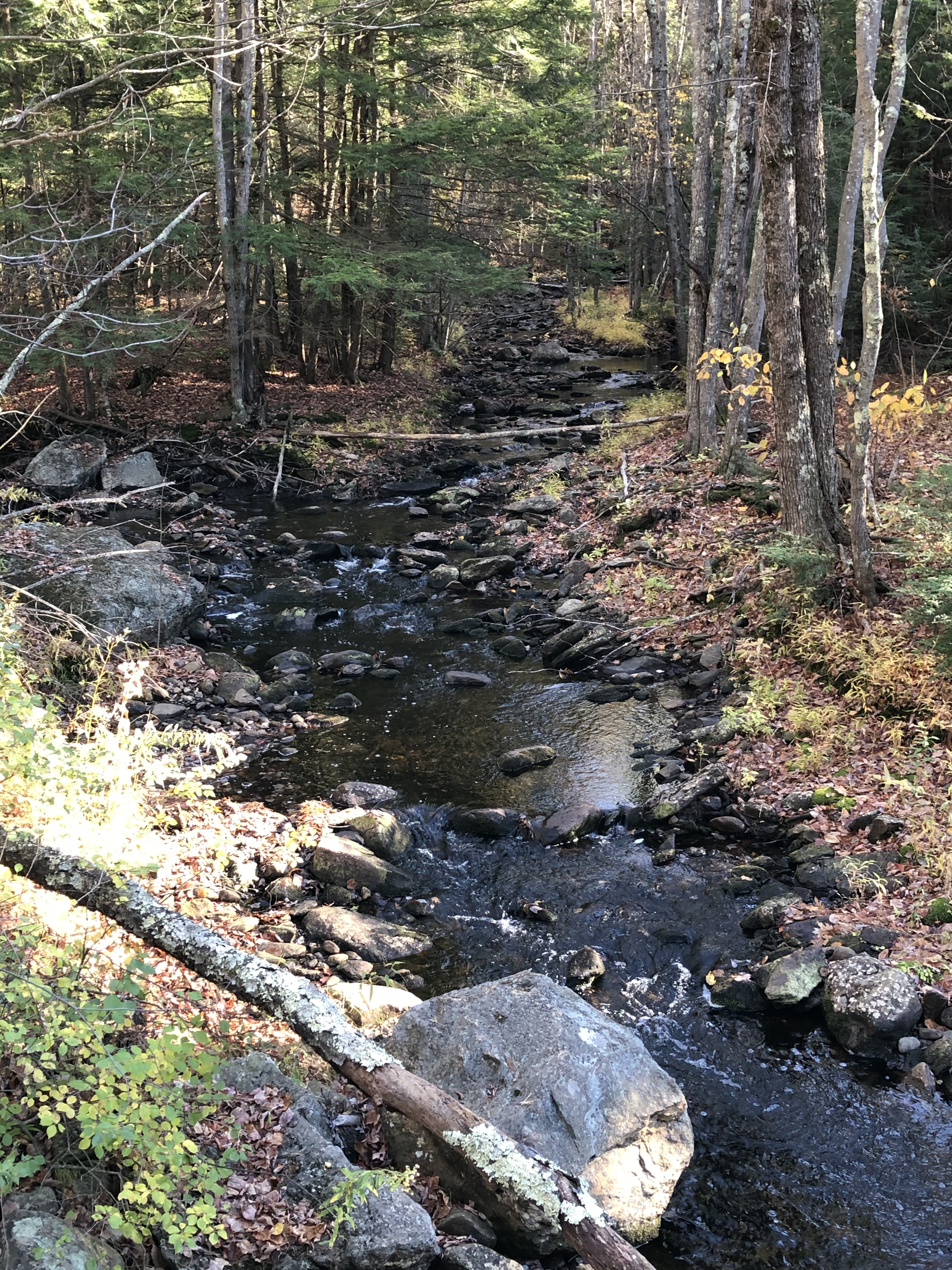
- The Little River at Route 126 in Strafford, NH

- Location within New Hampshire Location within the United States

Location
- Country: United States
- State: New Hampshire
- Counties: Strafford, Belknap
- Towns: Strafford, Barnstead

Physical characteristics
- Source: Blue Hills Range
  - location: Strafford
  - coordinates: 43°17′50″N 71°10′9″W
  - elevation: 900 ft (270 m)
- Mouth: Big River
  - location: Barnstead
  - coordinates: 43°19′47″N 71°13′59″W
  - elevation: 499 ft (152 m)
- Length: 4.9 mi (7.9 km)

The Little River is a 4.9-mile-long (7.9 km) river located in central New Hampshire in the United States. Its outflow travels via the Big River, Suncook River, and Merrimack River to the Gulf of Maine, an arm of the Atlantic Ocean.

The Little River begins on the west side of the Blue Hills Range in Strafford, New Hampshire. It flows northwest, gaining the outlet of the Willey Ponds, and joins the Big River just north of the village of South Barnstead.

== See also ==
- List of rivers of New Hampshire
