= Alton (CDP), New Hampshire =

Census-designated place in New Hampshire, United States

Alton, New Hampshire
- Census-designated place
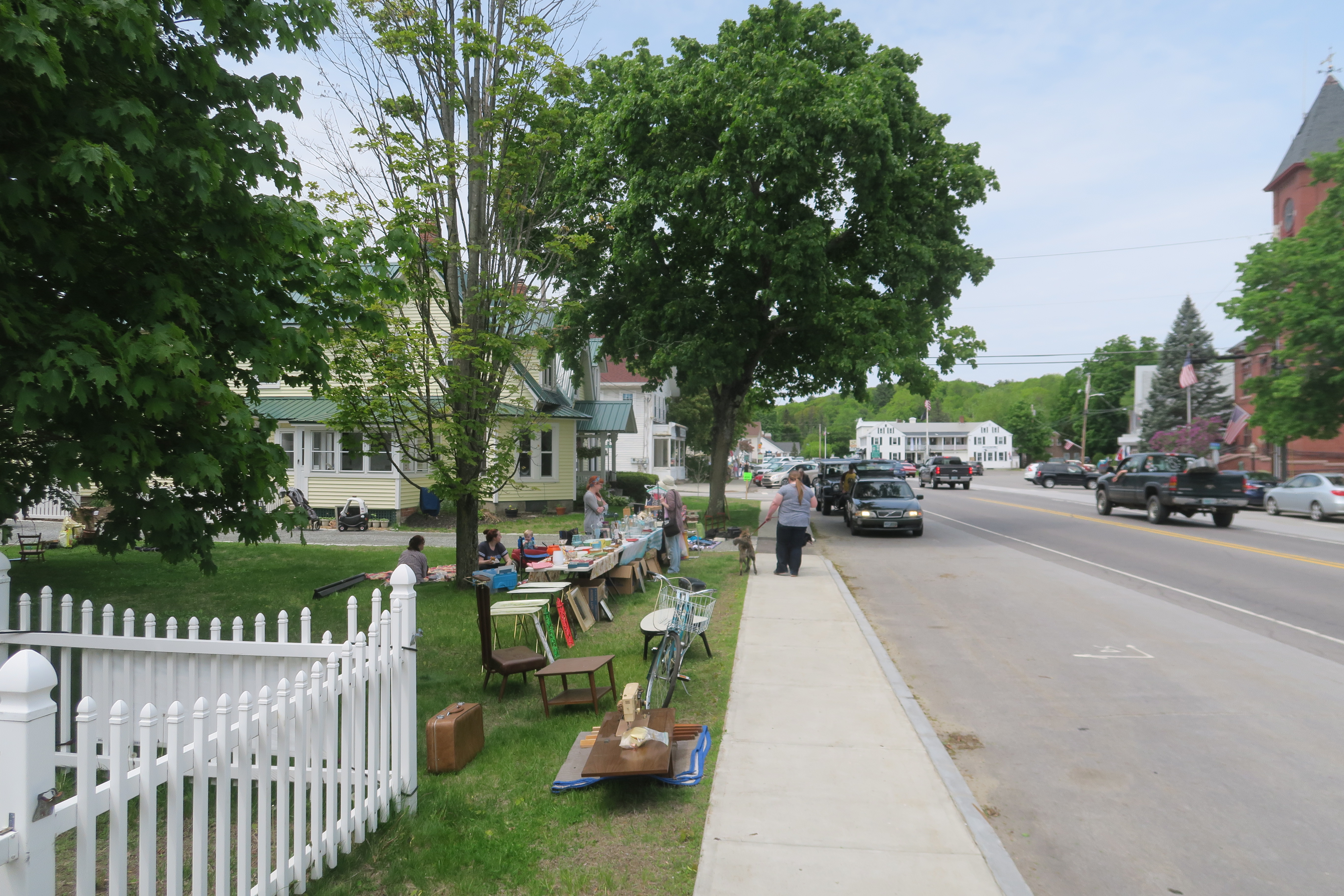
- A yard sale in Alton, 2019

- Location within New Hampshire Location within the United States
- Coordinates: 43°27′24″N 71°13′19″W
- Country: United States
- State: New Hampshire
- County: Belknap
- Town: Alton

Area
  - Total: 0.50 sq mi (1.30 km^{2})
  - Land: 0.47 sq mi (1.21 km^{2})
  - Water: 0.035 sq mi (0.09 km^{2})
- Elevation: 564 ft (172 m)

Population (2020)
  - Total: 499
  - Density: 1,067/sq mi (411.8/km^{2})
- Time zone: UTC-5 (Eastern (EST))
  - Summer (DST): UTC-4 (EDT)
- ZIP Code: 03809
- Area code: 603
- FIPS code: 33-00980
- GNIS feature ID: 2629709

Alton is a census-designated place (CDP) and the main village in the town of Alton, New Hampshire, United States. The population was 499 at the 2020 census, compared to 5,894 in the entire town of Alton.

== Geography ==
The center of the CDP is at the junction of New Hampshire Routes 11 and 140 in the south-central part of the town of Alton, about 1 mile (1.6 km) south of the southern tip of Lake Winnipesaukee at Alton Bay. The Alton CDP borders include the Merrymeeting River to the south, New Hampshire Route 28 to the east, Wilbert Way and Barr Road to the north, and an unnamed lake along the Merrymeeting River to the west. Route 28 leads north 11 miles (18 km) to Wolfeboro and southwest 13 miles (21 km) to Pittsfield, Route 11 leads southeast 17 miles (27 km) to Rochester and northwest 20 miles (32 km) to Laconia, and Route 140 leads west 12 miles (19 km) to Gilmanton.

According to the United States Census Bureau, the CDP has a total area of 0.50 square miles (1.3 km^{2}), of which 0.46 square miles (1.2 km^{2}) are land and 0.04 square miles (0.1 km^{2}), or 6.77%, are water.

== Demographics ==
Historical population
Census	Pop.	Note	%±
2010	501		—
2020	499		−0.4%
U.S. Decennial Census

As of the census of 2010, there were 501 people, 227 households, and 125 families residing in the CDP. There were 270 housing units, of which 43, or 15.9%, were vacant. 15 of the vacant units were seasonal or vacation properties. The racial makeup of the CDP was 99.0% white, 0.2% African American, 0.4% Asian, 0.4% from two or more races. 0.8% of the population were Hispanic or Latino of any race.

Of the 227 households in the CDP, 25.6% had children under the age of 18 living with them, 39.6% were headed by married couples living together, 10.6% had a female householder with no husband present, and 44.9% were non-families. 36.1% of all households were made up of individuals, and 16.7% were someone living alone who was 65 years of age or older. The average household size was 2.21, and the average family size was 2.91.

21.2% of residents in the CDP were under the age of 18, 9.4% were from age 18 to 24, 23.0% were from 25 to 44, 27.6% were from 45 to 64, and 19.0% were 65 years of age or older. The median age was 41.6 years. For every 100 females, there were 94.2 males. For every 100 females age 18 and over, there were 83.7 males.
