= S. Millett Thompson =

S. Millett Thompson (1838–1911) was a soldier in the Union Army during the American Civil War. Thompson was born in Barnstead, New Hampshire, and lived in Durham, New Hampshire. He enlisted on 13 August 1862 and joined Company E of the 13th New Hampshire Infantry Regiment on 19 September 1862 as a first sergeant. He was promoted to second lieutenant on 10 June 1863 and fought mostly in Virginia during the Civil War. Wounded during the Siege of Petersburg on 15 June 1864, Thompson was discharged from an infirmary in Hampton, Virginia, on 4 October 1864. After the war, he moved to Providence, Rhode Island, where he lived until his death on 26 May 1911.
