= Center Barnstead, New Hampshire =

Unincorporated community in New Hampshire, United States

- Unincorporated community
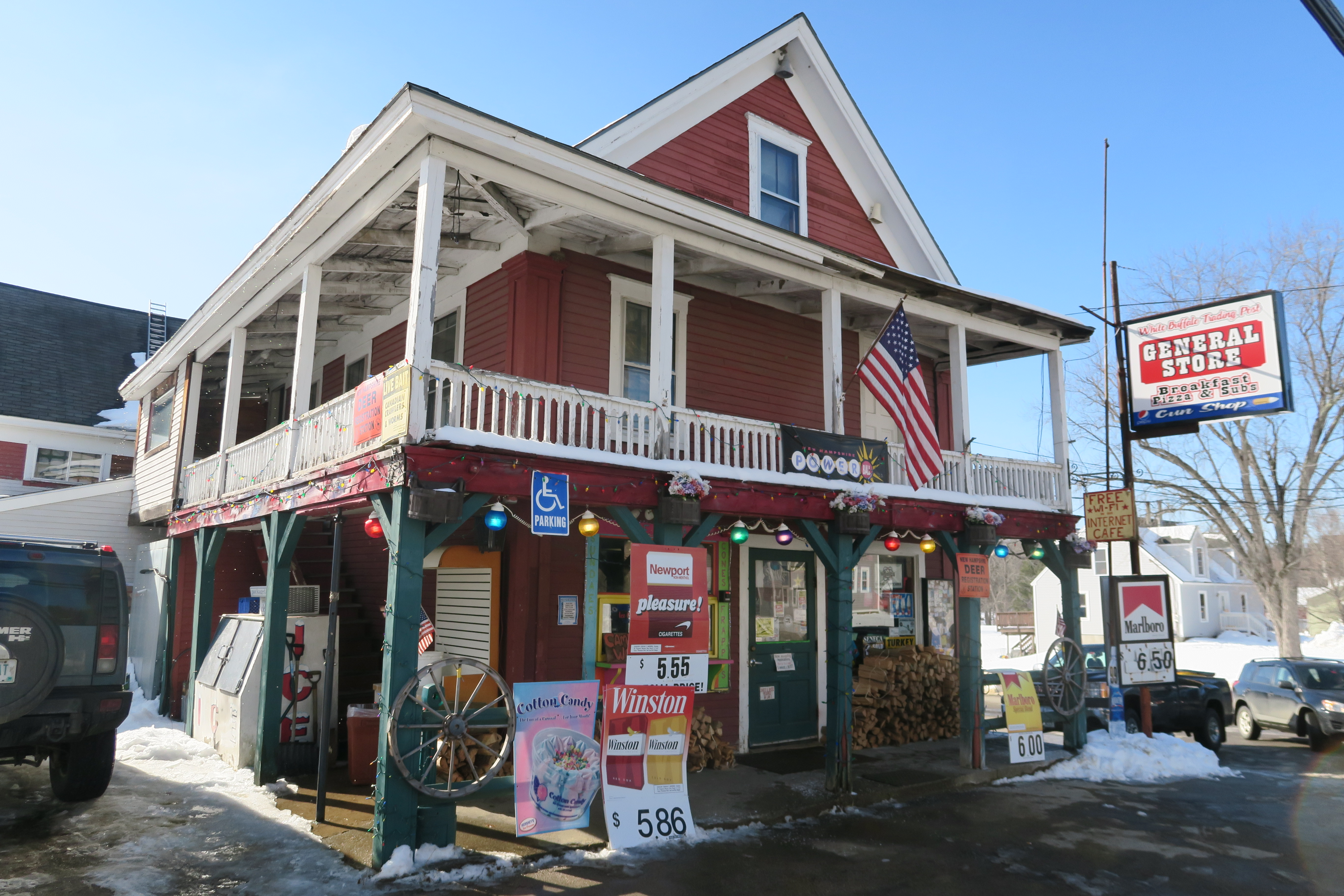
- White Buffalo Trading Post

- Location within New Hampshire Location within the United States
- Coordinates: 43°20′26″N 71°15′39″W
- Country: United States
- State: New Hampshire
- County: Belknap
- Town: Barnstead
- Elevation: 515 ft (157 m)
- Time zone: UTC-5 (Eastern (EST))
  - Summer (DST): UTC-4 (EDT)
- ZIP code: 03225
- Area code: 603
- GNIS feature ID: 866074

Center Barnstead is an unincorporated community in the town of Barnstead in Belknap County, New Hampshire, United States. It is the largest of several villages in the town.

New Hampshire Route 28 bypasses the village to the northwest, connecting Pittsfield to the southwest and Alton to the northeast. New Hampshire Route 126 begins at Route 28 and passes through the village before continuing southeast towards Strafford and Barrington. The village is located along the Suncook River and was a station along the former Suncook Valley Railroad. Center Barnstead has a separate ZIP code (03225) from the rest of the town of Barnstead.
