= Fanny E. Minot =

American public worker, social reformer and clubwoman

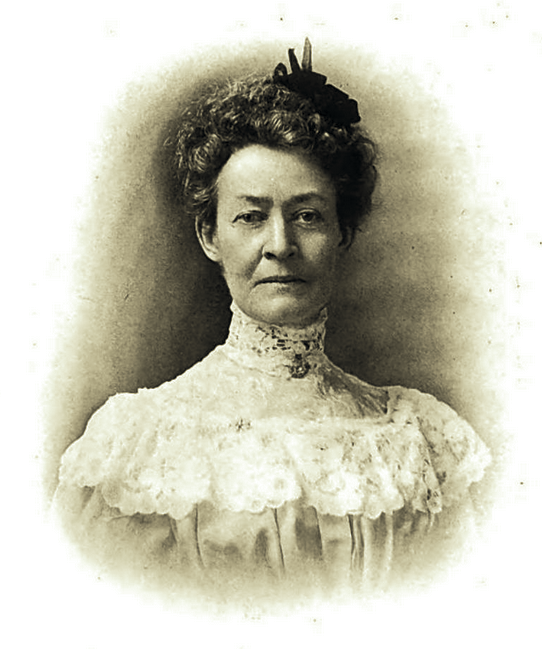
- Born: Fanny Elizabeth Pickering; September 27, 1847; Barnstead, New Hampshire, U.S.
- Died: March 4, 1919 (aged 71)
- Education: Wheaton Seminary
- Known for: National President, Woman's Relief Corps
- Spouse: James Minot (m. 1874)

Signature
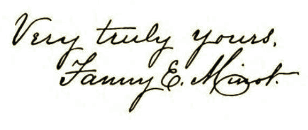

Fanny E. Minot (née Pickering; September 27, 1847 – March 4, 1919) was an American public worker, social reformer, charitable organization leader, and clubwoman who was at the front in many lines of public service, including charitable, educational, church and social work. She held a strong interest in all those movements of the 20th-century which brought women into prominence. Minot served as president of the Woman's Relief Corps (WRC) of Concord, New Hampshire, of the State of New Hampshire, and lastly, as the 22nd National President of the WRC. She was also a member and regent of the Daughters of the American Revolution (DAR).

== Early life and education ==
Fanny (sometimes, "Fannie") Elizabeth Pickering was born in Barnstead, New Hampshire, September 27, 1847. She was the elder daughter of Hazen and Martha Ann (Drew) Pickering. Minot had at least one sibling, a sister, Mrs. Clarence Blake. On the paternal side, Minot descended from Revolutionary ancestor John Pickering.

In her childhood, the family removed to Concord, where Hazen Pickering became city marshal. It is here that Minot received her academic education and grew to adulthood. She studied at Concord High School, 1865, and Wheaton Seminary (now Wheaton College, Norton, Massachusetts, 1867, being the valedictorian of her class at each institution.

== Career ==
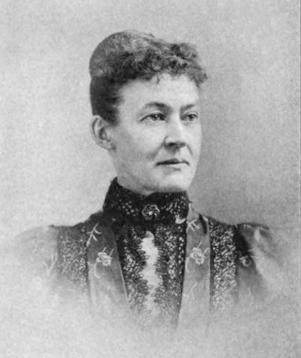
No later than 1895

Minot was known in Concord and in New Hampshire as a public worker and through her association with the WRC. She was a charter member of the E. E. Sturtevant Corps of Concord, which was one of the first to be organized in New Hampshire. Her abilities soon brought her into prominence in the local Corps, in which she held various offices up to and including the organization's first treasurer, later becoming president. She was also prominent in the state body. In 1893, she was elected Department President, having served as Department Secretary and Installing Officer. Her work as a national inspector and member of the national executive committee, in which she manifested exceptional executive ability and strong leadership, formed the stepping stone to the position of national president.

At the WRC's National Convention in Boston, 1904, Minot was unanimously elected National President on the first ballot. Her administration was eminently successful, and the Denver Convention proved her to be a presiding officer of signal ability. Her advice and her influence were invaluable to the local Corps, of which she had been Patriotic Instructor for nearly a score of years. At the meeting of the National Council of Women, Washington, D.C., April 9–15, 1905, Minot represented the 130,000 women of the WRC and spoke on "Patriotism".

For ten years she was connected with the Concord Board of Education, as a member of the School Board since 1908, and Secretary of the Board since 1914. A Daughter of the American Revolution, and Regent of Rumford Chapter, 1905–8, she was actively interested in the patriotic work of that society. She was President of the Concord Woman's Club, 1904–5, and a valuable member of the Education Committee of the General Federation of Women's Clubs, 1912–13. She was President of the New Hampshire Female Concord Institution, the oldest society organized and officered by women in the country, 1901–8; of the Concord Female Charitable Society, both in their second centenary; of the Federation of Missionary Societies, member of the Woman's Board of Foreign Missions, the Friendly Club, Charity Organization, Avon Club, District Nurses' Organization, American Red Cross, National League for Women's Service, New Hampshire Historical Society, and the Wheaton Seminary Alumnae Association.

== Personal life and death ==
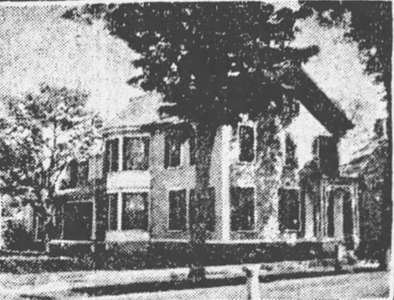
Minot home in Concord, N.H. (1904)

She married Capt. James Minot on May 13, 1874. He was the cashier at Mechanicks National Bank, and subsequently, commander of the Department of New Hampshire, Grand Army of the Republic, who died November 15, 1911.

She died March 4, 1919.
