= Caroline L. Ormes Ransom =

American artist (1826-1910)

- Born: 1826; Newark, Ohio
- Died: February 18, 1910 (aged 83–84); Washington D.C.
- Known for: Painting

Caroline L. Ormes Ransom (1826–1910) was an American painter known for her portraits.

Ransom was born in Newark, Ohio in 1826. She attended Grand River Institute in Austinburg, Ohio. She them moved to New York City where she studied landscape painting with Asher Brown Durand. She studied portraiture with Thomas Hicks and Daniel Huntington. Ransom traveled to Munich, Germany where she studied with Wilhelm von Kaulbach.

In 1861 Ransom set up a studio in Cleveland. She also was frequently in Washington, D.C where she worked on portrait commissions. In 1884 she moved to Washington, D.C. where she lived until her death on February 18, 1910.

Notable subjects include Alexander Hamilton and Joshua Reed Giddings. Her portrait Mrs. Goss is in the collection of the Cleveland Museum of Art. Her portrait of Civil War nurse Harriet Patience Dame was hung in the New Hampshire State House gallery, making Dame the first woman so honored. Ransom was a friend of James and Lucretia Garfield, and several of her works belonged to the Garfield family; a number of pieces are currently displayed at the James A. Garfield National Historic Site.

== Gallery ==
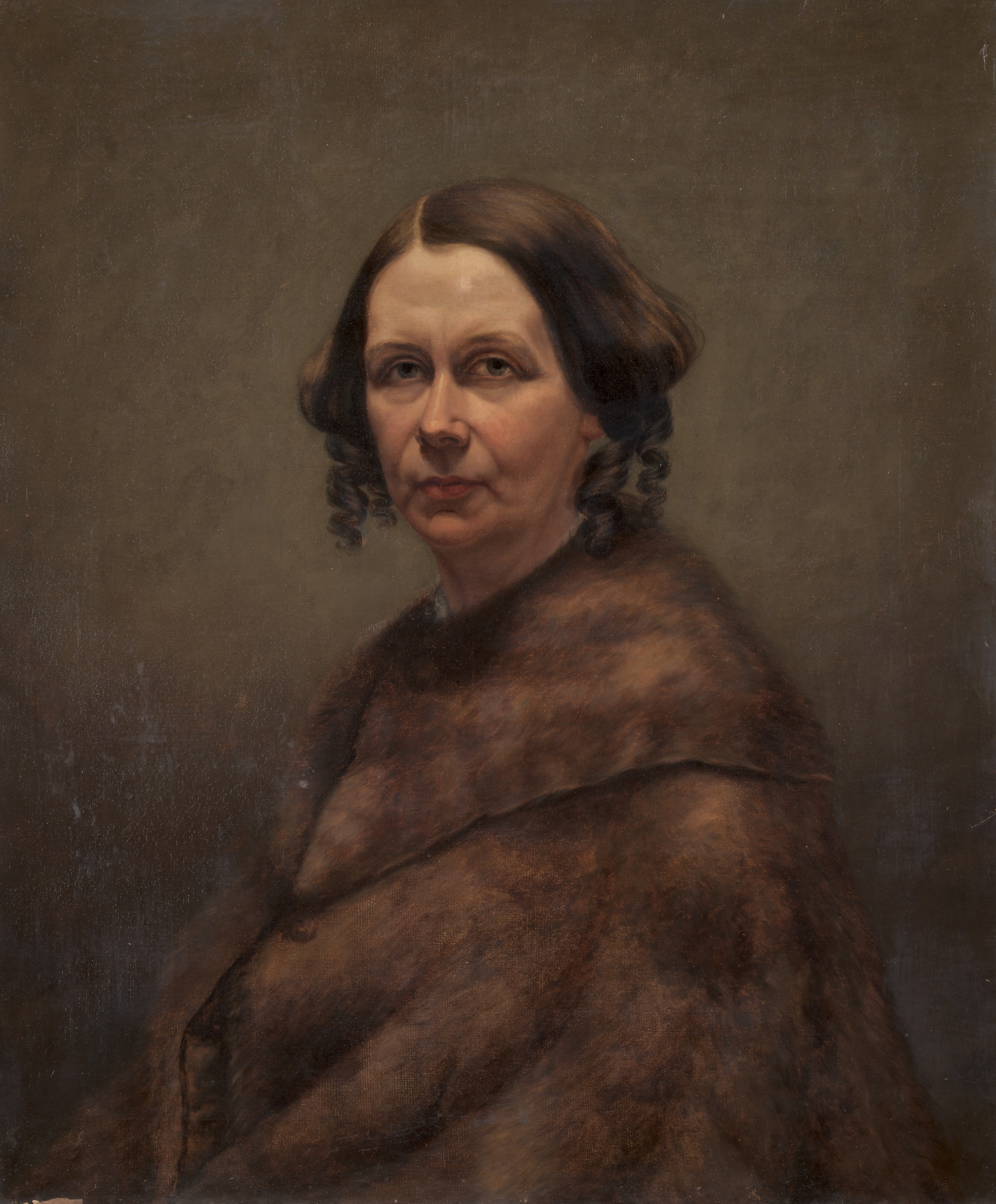
Mrs. Goss, c. 1850's

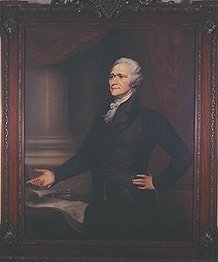
Alexander Hamilton, c. 1880

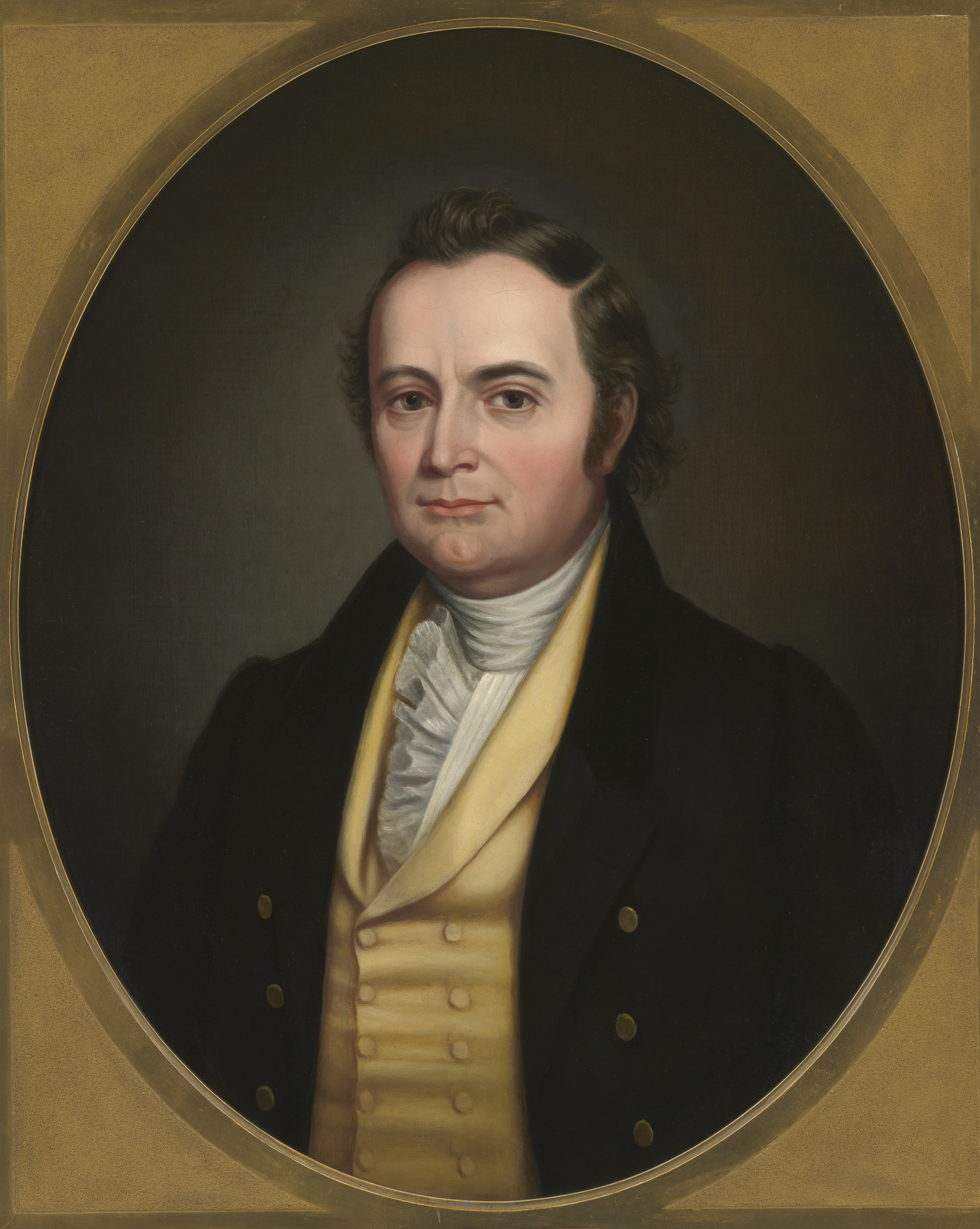
John W. Taylor, c. 1900

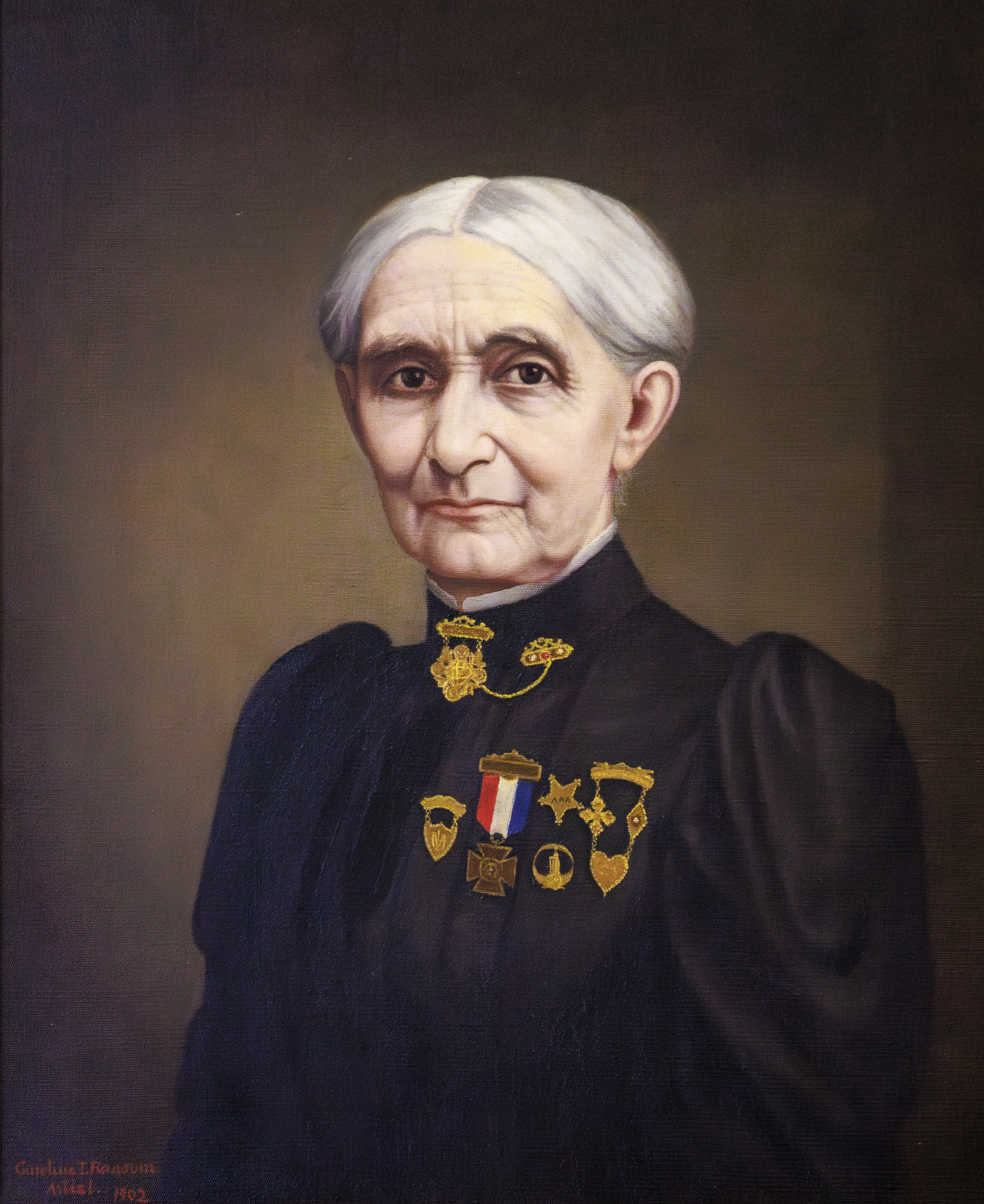
Harriet Patience Dame, in the New Hampshire State House, c. 1902
