= Harriet Patience Dame =

Nurse in the American Civil War (1815–1900)

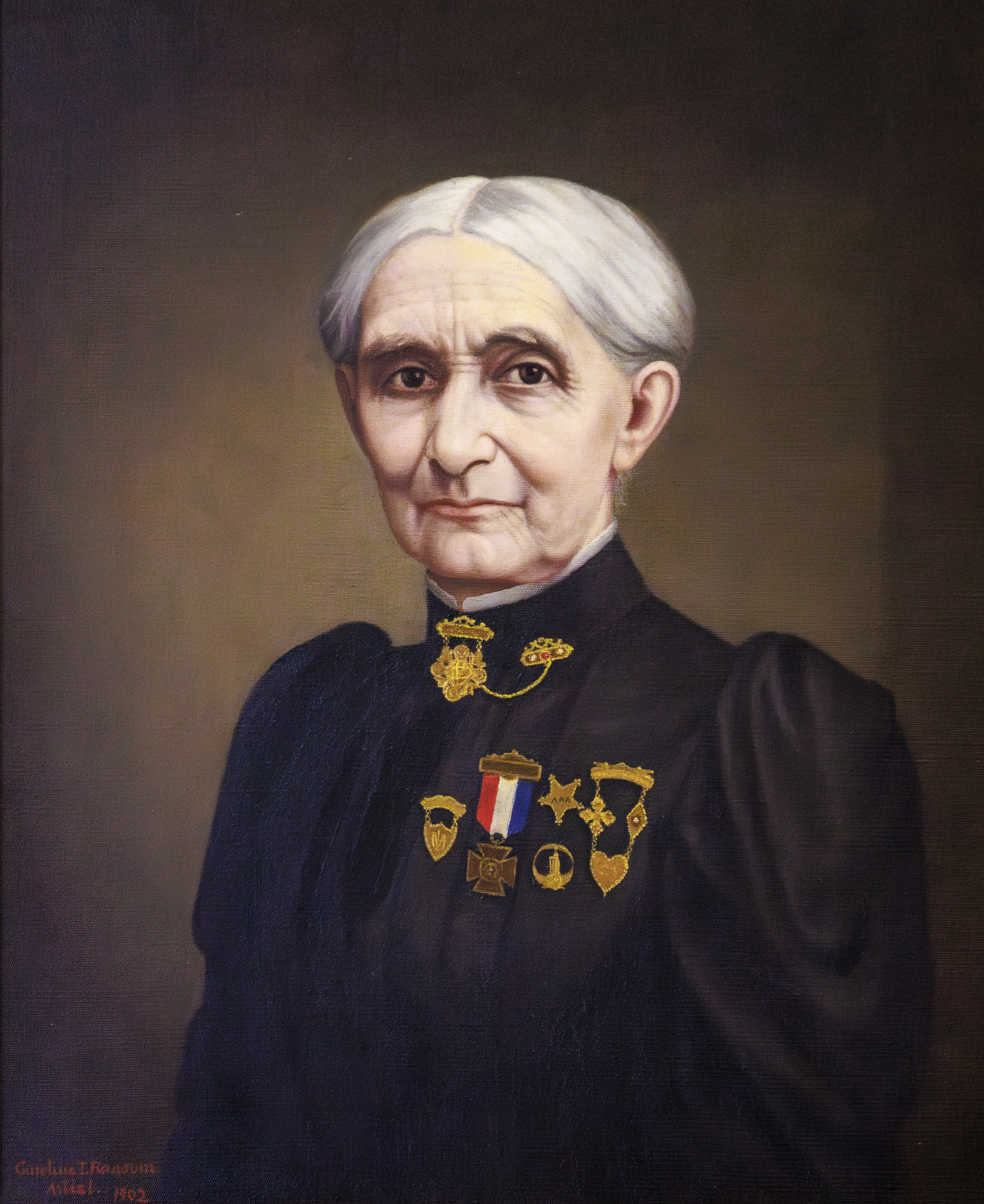
- Dame's portrait in the New Hampshire State House by Caroline L. Ormes Ransom
- Born: 5 January 1815; Barnstead, New Hampshire, U.S.
- Died: 24 April 1900 (aged 85); Concord, New Hampshire, U.S.
- Occupation: Nurse
- Years active: 1861-1865
- Known for: Civil War nurse

Harriet Patience Dame (January 5, 1815 – April 24, 1900) was a prominent nurse in the American Civil War. Her portrait hangs in the New Hampshire State House.

== Early life ==
Dame was born in Barnstead, New Hampshire, (or North Barnstead) to James Chadbourne and Phebe Ayers on January 5, 1815. Dame was the youngest of five children. In 1843, Dame moved to Concord, New Hampshire, where she lived until the outbreak of the Civil War, and worked at various occupations. By 1861, she ran a student boarding house. She had no formal training as a nurse.

== Civil War ==
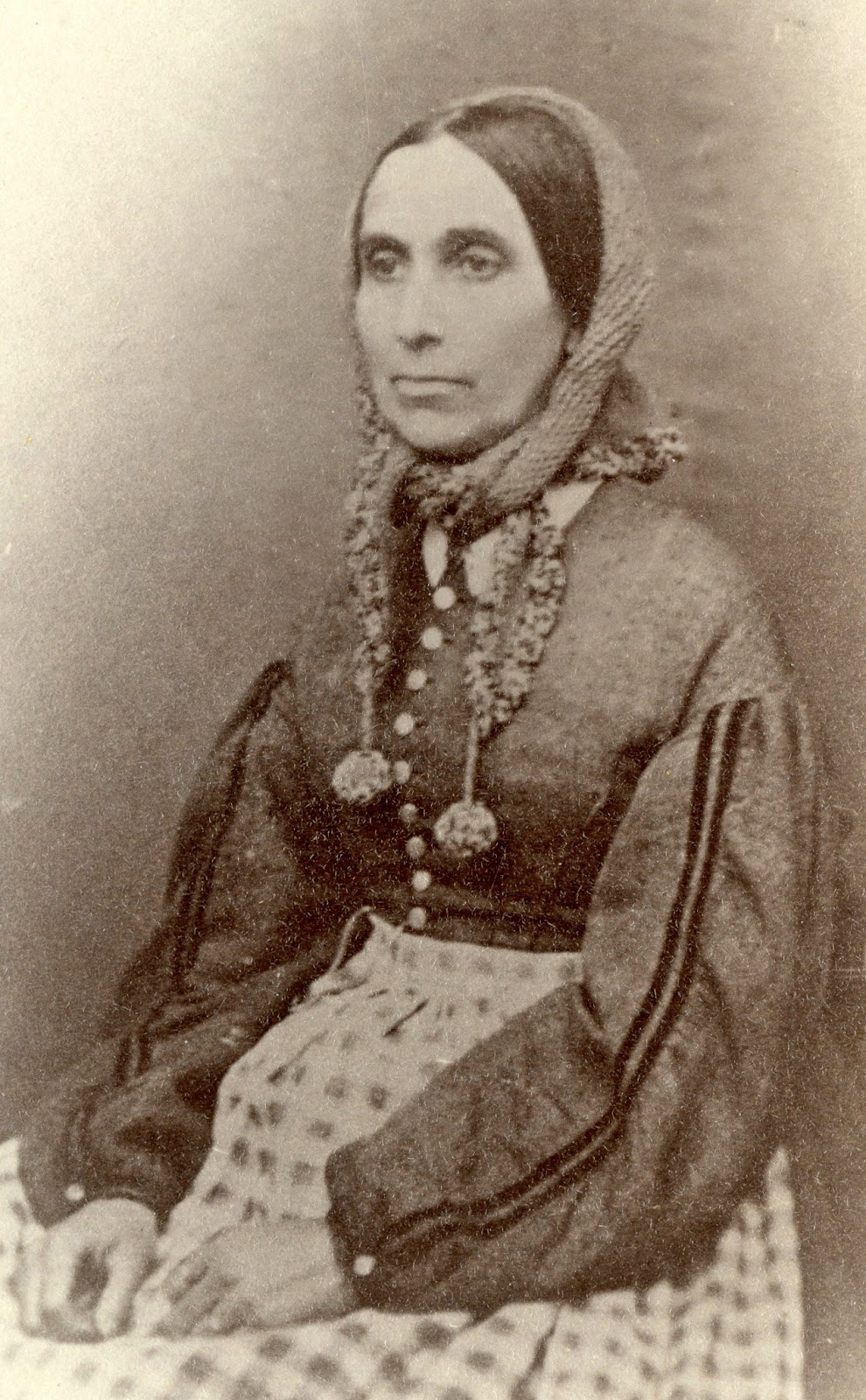
Harriet Patience Dame during the war

When war came, Dame, aged 46, approached the recruit training station at Camp Union in Concord and offered her services to officers there. Because the camp had no infirmary, Dame was put into service as a nurse.

Dame served with the 2nd New Hampshire Volunteer Infantry as a matron from June 1861 to Christmas 1865 when the regiment was mustered out of service. She served without furlough through two enlistment periods. Her pay as a hospital matron was six dollars a month until 1863, when the wage increased to ten dollars a month.

The regiment was mainly made up of men from Concord and Exeter, led by Col. Gilman Marston. Dame marched and camped alongside the troops, often as the only woman among a thousand men. She was appointed matron of the 18th Army Corps hospital in September 1864. Her duties included supervising other nurses, and cooking for the hospital patients, often numbering in the thousands. Marston said of her: "Miss Dame was the bravest woman I ever knew. I have seen her face a cannon battery without flinching while a man took refuge behind her for safety from flying shells. She was always present when most needed." She saw action at first Bull Run, second Bull Run, Fredericksburg, and Gettysburg. Dame's tending to the men went beyond medical attention; she would sometimes pick strawberries for the wounded, or write letters home for them. Dame's nursing duties varied as well; sometimes she would oversee supplies, other times she would investigate the sanitary conditions of other regiments. Dame remained at this hospital until the end of active war operations, when she reconvened with the 2nd New Hampshire Regiment. On December 25, 1865, the regiment was mustered out of service, ending Dame's service.

She was twice captured in battle, and released by her captors. At the Second Battle of Bull Run, Dame was taken as a prisoner but released because she cared for Union and Confederate soldiers indiscriminately. In once instance, Stonewall Jackson authorized her return to Union lines.

== Post-war life ==
After the war, Dame was appointed by William E. Chandler to a Treasury Department clerkship in Washington, D.C., which she held for twenty-eight years until 1895. She did not return to her home state until 1900. Congress voted her a military pension in 1884, though Dame always donated the money to those in need.

Dame served as the third president of the National Association of Army Nurses of the Civil War, upon the death of Dorothea Dix and resignation of Dr. Susan Ann Edson.

Dame never married.

== Honors ==
- The cross of the 18th Corps, the diamond of the 3rd Corps of Hooker's Division, the heart of the 12th Corps, and a gold badge from the 2nd New Hampshire
- Shortly after the Civil War, the New Hampshire legislature awarded Dame $500 for extraordinary public service. She donated most of the money to the 2nd Regiment, for the founding of a home for veterans.
- Upon her death in 1900, Governor Frank W. Rollins and the state militia participated in her funeral ceremony.
- In 1901 the New Hampshire Legislature commissioned that her portrait be painted by artist Caroline L. Ormes Ransom, and hung in the New Hampshire State House. It was the first portrait of a woman to hang there.
- The Harriet P. Dame Elementary School in Concord was named in her honor.
- In 2002, Dame was inducted into the Hall of Fame by the American Nurses Association.
