= Prospect Mountain High School =

Coordinates: 43°26′15″N 71°12′48″W

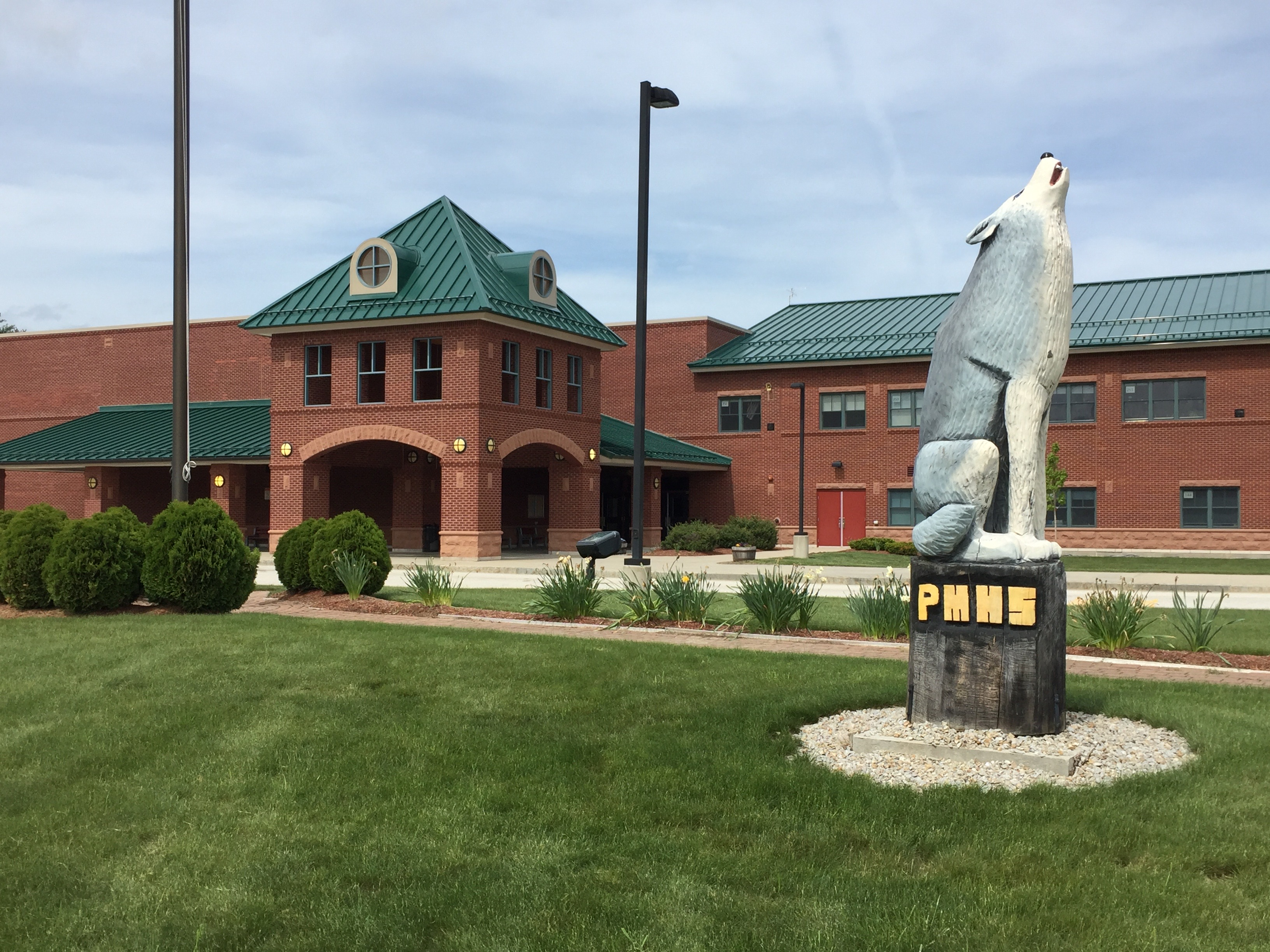
- 242 Suncook Valley Road; Alton, New Hampshire 03809; United States

Information
- Type: Public high school
- Established: 2004
- Principal: David Latchaw
- Teaching staff: 36.20 (FTE)
- Enrollment: 402 (2024-2025)
- Student to teacher ratio: 11.10
- Campus: Rural
- Color
- Team name: Timberwolves
- Website: pmhs.pmsau.org/o/pmhs

Prospect Mountain High School is a public high school located in Alton, New Hampshire, United States, and is attended by students from Alton and Barnstead. It is in the Prospect Mountain High School Joint Maintenance Agreement District.

It has been in operation since 2004. Prospect Mountain's athletic teams are known as the Timberwolves.
