= James B. French =

American politician

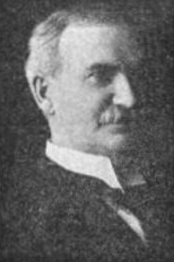

Member of the Wisconsin State Assembly
- In office 1911, 1919, 1921

Personal details
- Born: July 29, 1857 Alton, New Hampshire, US
- Died: February 11, 1932 (aged 74) Superior, Wisconsin, US
- Party: Republican
- Education: University of Iowa
- Occupation: Lawyer

James B. French (1857–1932) was a member of the Wisconsin State Assembly.

== Biography ==
French was born on July 29, 1857, in Alton, New Hampshire. He graduated from the University of Iowa in 1882. In 1888, he settled in Superior, Wisconsin. French died there on February 11, 1932, and is interred in Superior.

== Career ==
French was a member of the Assembly during the 1911, 1919 and 1921 sessions. Additionally, he was Chairman of the Republican Committee of Douglas County, Wisconsin.
