= Alton Bay, New Hampshire =

Unincorporated community in New Hampshire, United States

- Unincorporated community
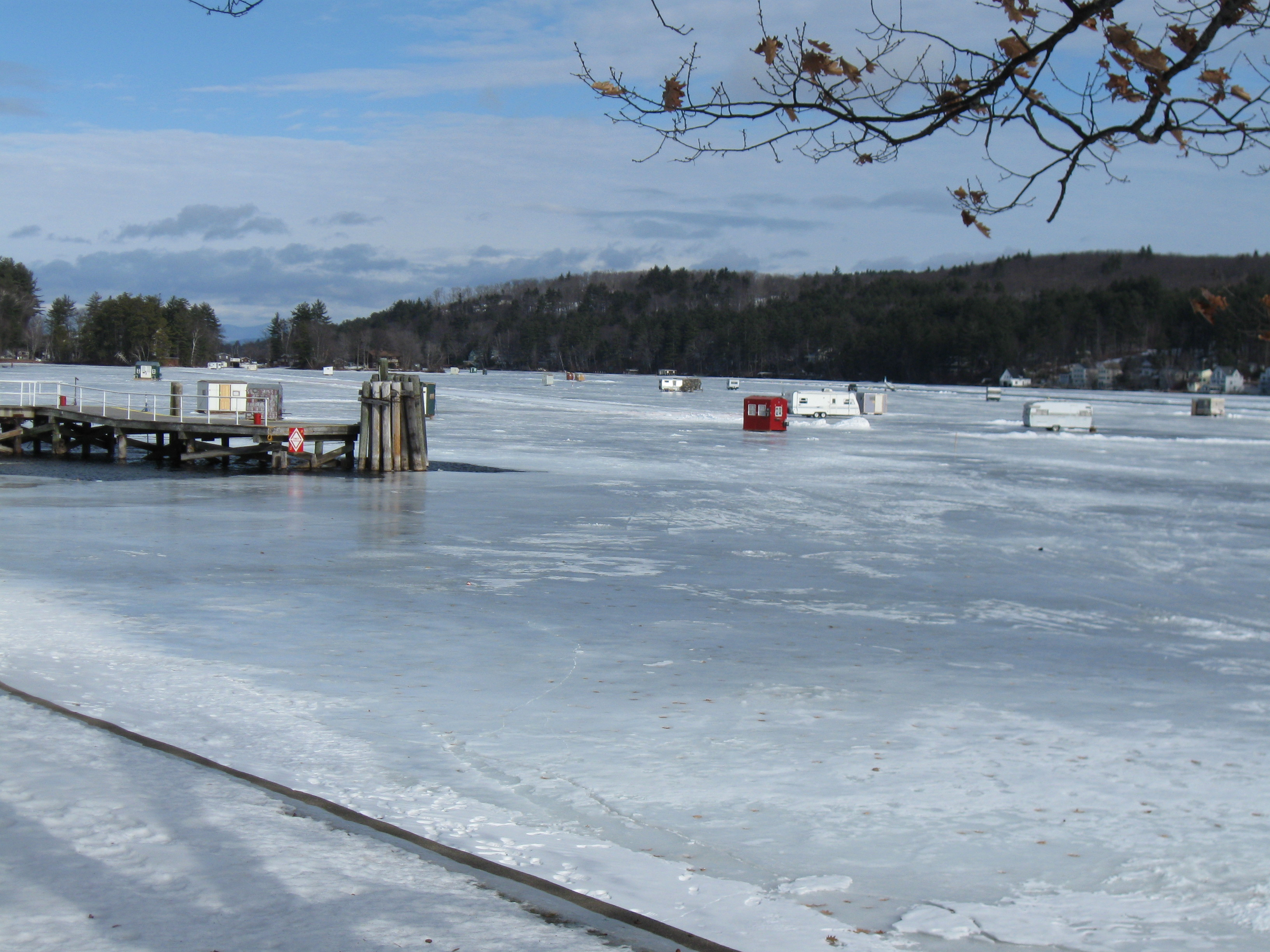
- Ice fishing structures on Alton Bay in Lake Winnipesaukee, 2010

- Location within New Hampshire Location within the United States
- Coordinates: 43°28′12″N 71°14′3″W
- Country: United States
- State: New Hampshire
- County: Belknap
- Town: Alton
- Elevation: 512 ft (156 m)
- Time zone: UTC−5 (Eastern (EST))
  - Summer (DST): UTC−4 (EDT)
- ZIP Code: 03810
- Area code: 603
- GNIS feature ID: 865227

Alton Bay is an unincorporated community in the town of Alton in Belknap County, New Hampshire, United States, and is located on Alton Bay, a 4-mile-long (6 km) cove of Lake Winnipesaukee which forms the southernmost point on the lake. The village is part of the Lakes Region, a popular resort area of the state.

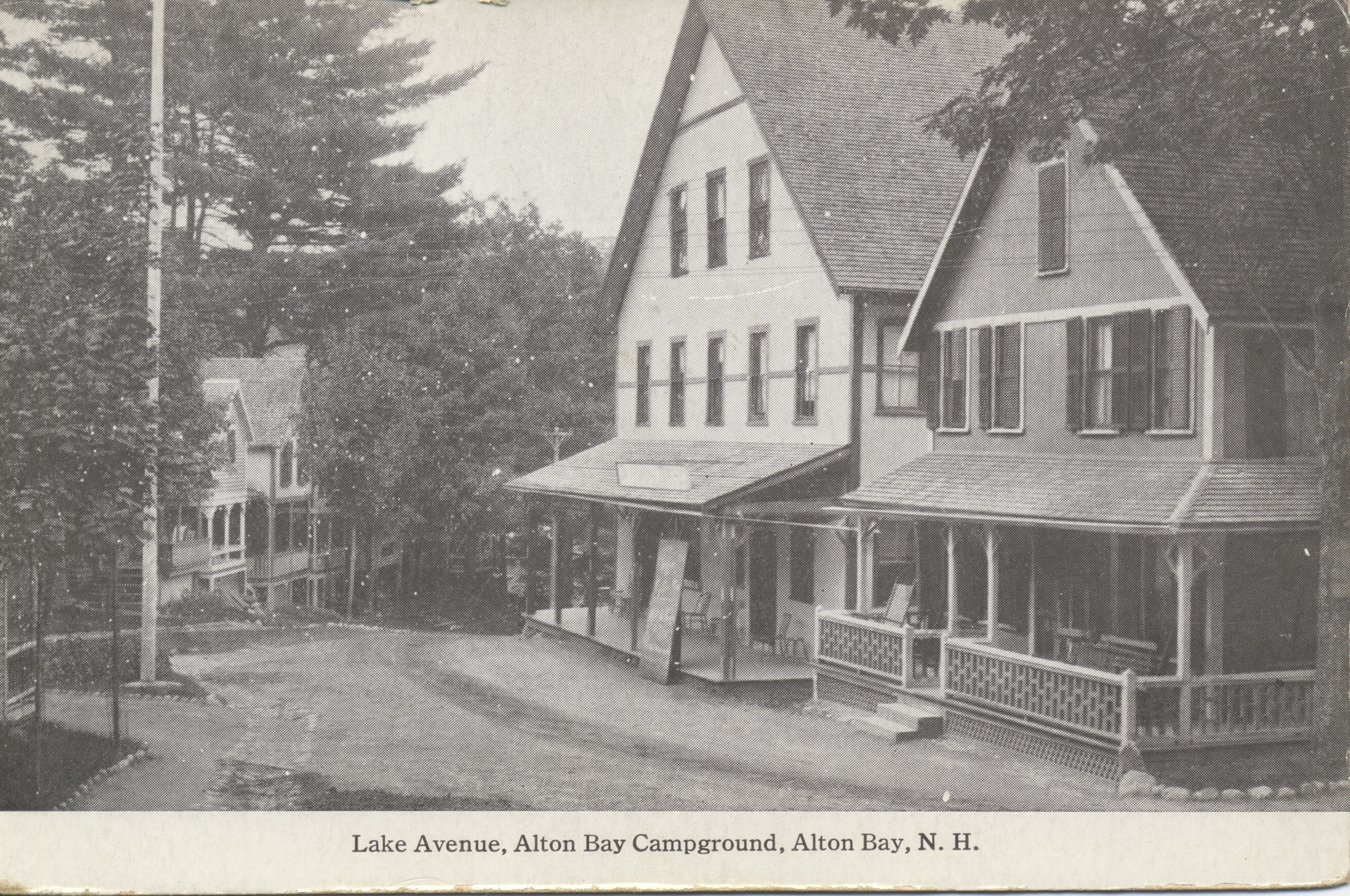
Lake Avenue, Alton Bay Campground

Alton Bay is located at the intersection of New Hampshire Route 11 and Route 28A, 1 mile (1.6 km) north of the center of Alton. Route 11 is an east-west highway that crosses the entire state of New Hampshire, connecting Laconia to the west and Rochester to the east. Route 28A is a local highway that joins Route 28 four miles (6 km) north of Alton Bay.

In 1851, the village became the terminus of the Cochecho Railroad from Dover. The rail line became the Lake Shore Railroad in 1890, continuing west to Lakeport in Laconia. It was in operation until 1935. The MS Mount Washington and its predecessor ships on Lake Winnipesaukee have made Alton Bay a stop since 1872.

Alton Bay is home to the Alton Bay Christian Conference Center, a Christian retreat center and campground organized in 1863 as the Second Advent Camp Meeting, and incorporated as the Alton Bay Camp Meeting Association in 1876. It continues its year-round ministry by hosting retreat groups, summer camps, concerts, speakers, and summer residents, who live there and participate in the services of the Association.

The village has a separate ZIP Code (03810) from the rest of the town of Alton.

== See also ==
- New Hampshire Historical Marker No. 164: Alton Bay Transportation Center
- New Hampshire Historical Marker No. 288: The Alton Bay Water Bandstand
