= Florence Holway =

- Born: June 2, 1915; Massachusetts, United States
- Died: February 7, 2012 (aged 96); New Hampshire, United States
- Occupation(s): Artist, Advocate for victims of sexual assault

Florence Robie Reed Holway (June 2, 1915 – February 7, 2012) was a woman who was raped and sodomized at the age of 75 by John LaForest on March 31, 1991, in her Alton, New Hampshire home. Her subsequent fight for justice ultimately resulted in changes to that state's rape laws and is the subject of a 2005 HBO documentary entitled Rape in a Small Town: The Florence Holway Story, which chronicled her ordeal.

== Activism ==
Following the assault, Holway incorrectly believed that her attacker, John LaForest, would automatically receive a lengthy sentence, but was shocked to learn that, without her consent, he was instead offered a plea bargain which would result in his receiving a 12-year sentence. The enraged Holway, who firmly maintained that rape is not about sex, but rather violence, started a petition drive and alerted the media to her plight.

Due to her efforts, stronger sentences against sex offenders went into effect in 1993: First-time offenders in New Hampshire are now sentenced to 15–20 years instead of 7.5–15 years, second-time offenders are sentenced to 20–40 years, and third-time offenders are sentenced to life without parole. In addition, New Hampshire now has a sex offender registry; prosecutors cannot offer plea bargains without the victim's knowledge.

== Parole hearing ==
In 2003, Holway testified at LaForest's parole hearing, speaking to him directly and, as shown in the documentary, questioning the sincerity of his remorse. Although his parole was initially denied, he was eventually set free. He was arrested again after just two months for harassing a woman at his workplace.

== Personal life ==
Holway was married at 28 and had five children, four boys and one girl. An accomplished artist, she enjoyed oil and watercolor painting. Much of her art was inspired by her children and their daily activities.
