= Barnstead, New Hampshire =

- Town
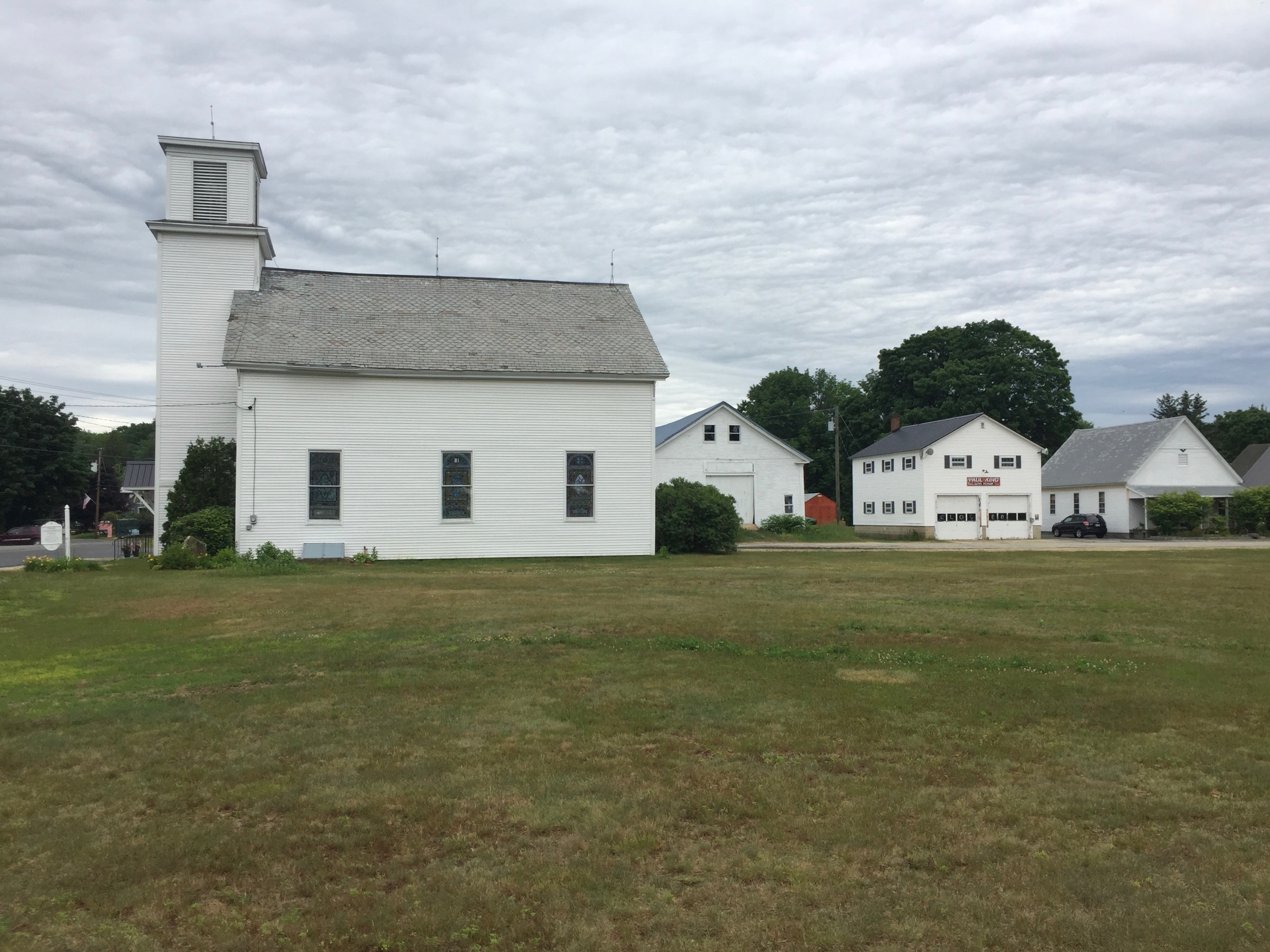
- Barnstead Parade

- Seal

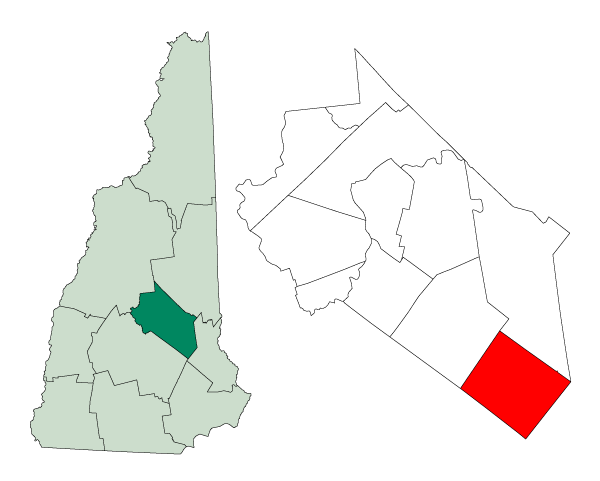
- Location in Belknap County, New Hampshire
- Coordinates: 43°21′05″N 71°15′19″W
- Country: United States
- State: New Hampshire
- County: Belknap
- Incorporated: 1767
- Villages: Barnstead (Barnstead Parade); Center Barnstead; South Barnstead

Area
  - Total: 44.9 sq mi (116.4 km^{2})
  - Land: 43.1 sq mi (111.5 km^{2})
  - Water: 1.9 sq mi (4.9 km^{2}) 4.18%
- Elevation: 528 ft (161 m)

Population (2020)
  - Total: 4,915
  - Density: 114/sq mi (44.1/km^{2})
- Time zone: UTC-5 (Eastern)
  - Summer (DST): UTC-4 (Eastern)
- ZIP codes: 03218 (Barnstead); 03225 (Center Barnstead)
- Area code: 603
- FIPS code: 33-03220
- GNIS feature ID: 873537
- Website: www.barnstead.org

Barnstead is a town in Belknap County, New Hampshire, United States. The population was 4,915 at the 2020 census, and an estimated 5,038 in 2025, up from 4,593 at the 2010 census. Home to the Suncook Lakes, Barnstead includes the villages of Center Barnstead, Barnstead Parade (identified as "Barnstead" on topographic maps) and South Barnstead.

== History ==
The town was granted on May 20, 1727, by Lieutenant Governor John Wentworth to the Reverend Joseph Adams and others. Settlement commenced in 1765, and two years later Barnstead was incorporated as a town by Governor John Wentworth. Many of the settlers came from Barnstable, Massachusetts, and Hempstead, New York—the name is taken from these two.

Although not mountainous, the terrain forms large swells, good for grazing. By 1830, when the population was 2,047, the town contained about 2,500 sheep. Farmers found the soil easy to cultivate and productive. The Suncook River and its tributaries provided water power for mills. By 1859, industries included a woolen cloth factory, seven sawmills, four shingle mills, four clapboard mills, one grooving machine, one turning machine, and two tanneries. Barnstead manufactured large amounts of lumber, which it supplied to neighboring towns.

Barnstead was served in 1874 by the Concord and Rochester Railroad, and an extension of the Suncook Valley Railroad was being planned.

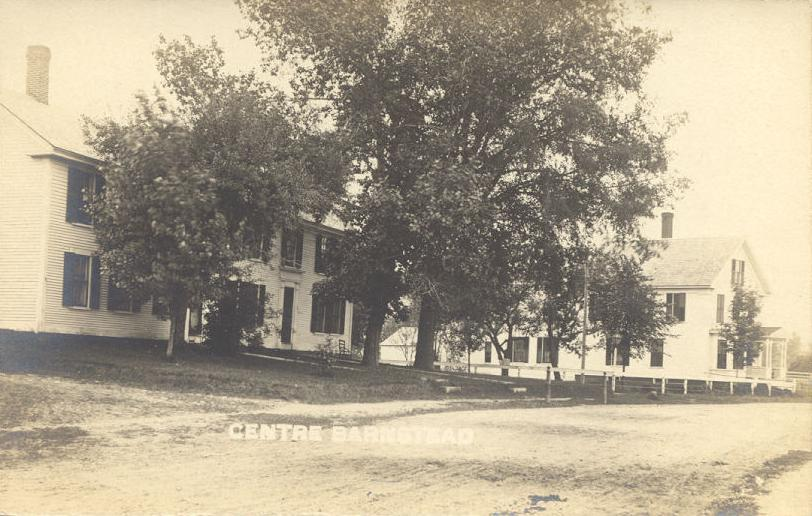
Center Barnstead in 1909

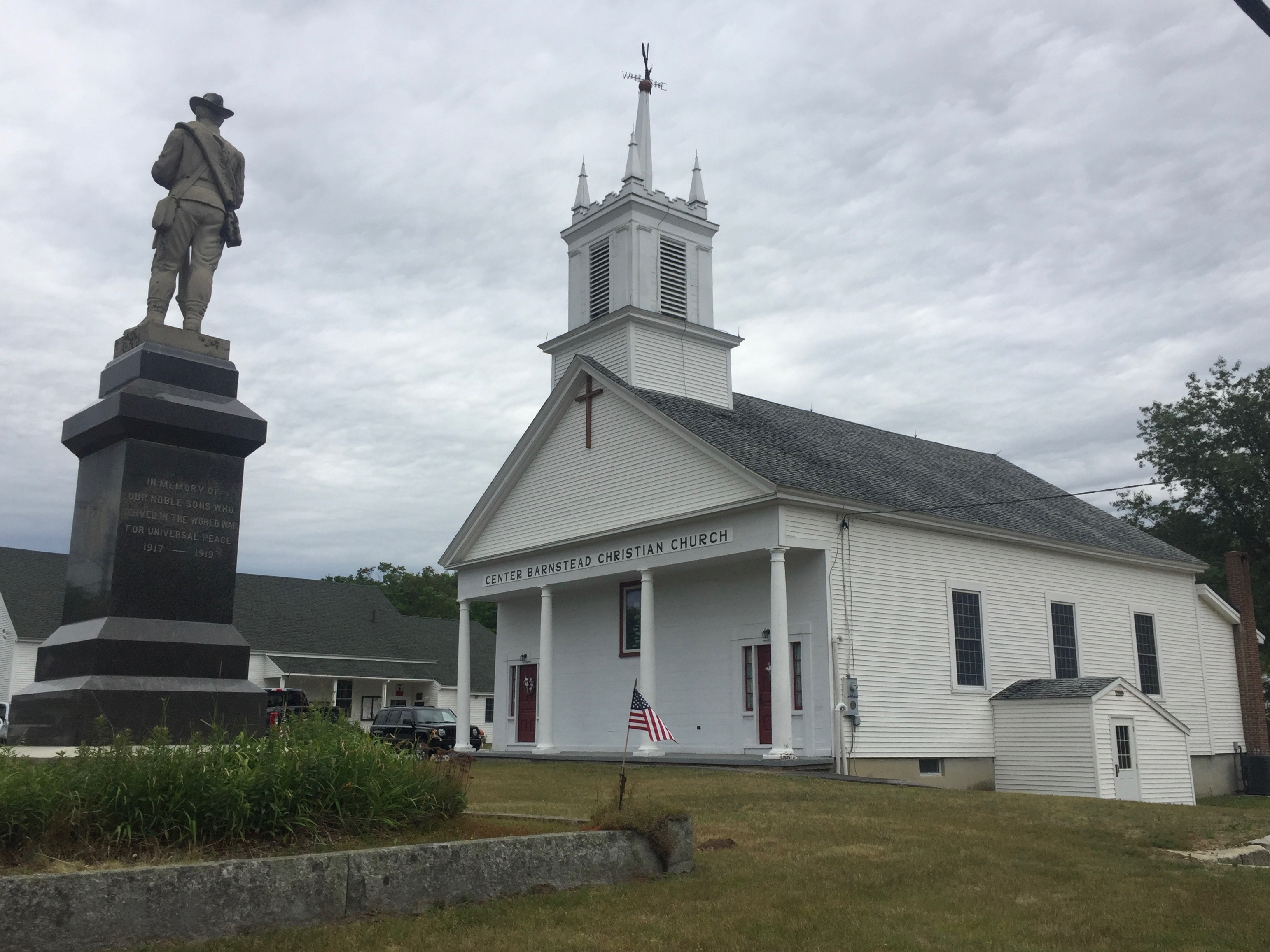
Center Barnstead in 2018

== Geography ==
According to the United States Census Bureau, the town has a total area of 44.9 square miles (116.4 km^{2}), of which 43.1 sq mi (111.5 km^{2}) are land and 1.9 sq mi (4.9 km^{2}) are water, comprising 4.2% of the town. The highest point in Barnstead is 1,190 feet (360 m) above sea level along the town's northern border, near the community of Locke's Corner. Drained by the Suncook River, Barnstead lies fully within the Merrimack River watershed.

New Hampshire Route 28 traverses the town from north to south, connecting Alton and Wolfeboro to the north with Pittsfield and Suncook to the south. New Hampshire Route 126 begins in Center Barnstead and travels southeast to Strafford and Barrington. New Hampshire Route 107 cuts through the western corner of Barnstead, leading from Pittsfield in the south to Laconia in the north.

=== Adjacent municipalities ===
- Alton (north)
- Strafford (east)
- Pittsfield (south)
- Gilmanton (west)

== Demographics ==
Historical population
Census	Pop.	Note	%±
1790	807		—
1800	1,161		43.9%
1810	1,477		27.2%
1820	1,805		22.2%
1830	2,047		13.4%
1840	1,945		−5.0%
1850	1,848		−5.0%
1860	1,885		2.0%
1870	1,543		−18.1%
1880	1,296		−16.0%
1890	1,264		−2.5%
1900	1,072		−15.2%
1910	1,081		0.8%
1920	873		−19.2%
1930	791		−9.4%
1940	804		1.6%
1950	846		5.2%
1960	850		0.5%
1970	1,119		31.6%
1980	2,292		104.8%
1990	3,100		35.3%
2000	3,886		25.4%
2010	4,593		18.2%
2020	4,915		7.0%
2024 (est.)	5,036	▲	2.5%
U.S. Decennial Census

As of the 2000 census, there were 3,886 people, 1,422 households, and 1,096 families residing in the town. The population density was 92.7 inhabitants per square mile (35.8/km^{2}). There were 1,994 housing units at an average density of 47.6 per square mile (18.4/km^{2}). The racial makeup of the town was 97.74% White, 0.62% African American, 0.31% Native American, 0.59% Asian, 0.05% from other races, and 0.69% from two or more races. Hispanic or Latino of any race were 0.59% of the population.

There were 1,422 households, out of which 34.9% had children under the age of 18 living with them, 66.2% were married couples living together, 6.3% had a female householder with no husband present, and 22.9% were non-families. 17.0% of all households were made up of individuals, and 5.3% had someone living alone who was 65 years of age or older. The average household size was 2.73 and the average family size was 3.08.

In the town, the population was spread out, with 26.4% under the age of 18, 6.2% from 18 to 24, 29.4% from 25 to 44, 27.1% from 45 to 64, and 10.9% who were 65 years of age or older. The median age was 39 years. For every 100 females, there were 104.0 males. For every 100 females age 18 and over, there were 102.4 males.

The median income for a household in the town was $47,449, and the median income for a family was $49,404. Males had a median income of $34,130 versus $24,904 for females. The per capita income for the town was $19,773. About 2.8% of families and 3.8% of the population were below the poverty line, including 6.4% of those under age 18 and 4.7% of those age 65 or over.

== Government ==
Barnstead vote by party in presidential elections
Year	Democratic	Republican	Third parties
2020	39.4% 1,150	58.1% 1,698	2.5% 74
2016	35.7% 924	54.6% 1,520	5.5% 145
2012	46.5% 1,125	51.8% 1,254	1.7% 40
2008	49.2% 1,189,	49.7% 1,201	0.1% 26

In the New Hampshire Senate, Barnstead is in the 6th District, represented by Republican James Gray. On the Executive Council of New Hampshire, Barnstead is in the 2nd District, represented by Democrat Cinde Warmington. In the United States House of Representatives, Barnstead is in New Hampshire's 1st congressional district, represented by Democrat Chris Pappas.

== Education ==
Barnstead has one elementary school (Barnstead Elementary School), serving pre-kindergarten through 8th grade. High school students go to Prospect Mountain High School, a regional high school in the neighboring town of Alton.

== Notable people ==
- Russell Banks (1940–2023), novelist, poet; lived in Barnstead as a child
- Harriet Patience Dame (1815–1900), nurse during the Civil War, born in Barnstead
- Fanny E. Minot (1847–1919), born in Barnstead; national president Woman's Relief Corps
- S. Millett Thompson (?–1911), Union Army second lieutenant during the Civil War
- Harrison Thyng (1918–1983), US Air Force brigadier general
- Hiram A. Tuttle (1837–1911), merchant, 43rd governor of New Hampshire
