= Alton, New Hampshire =

- Town
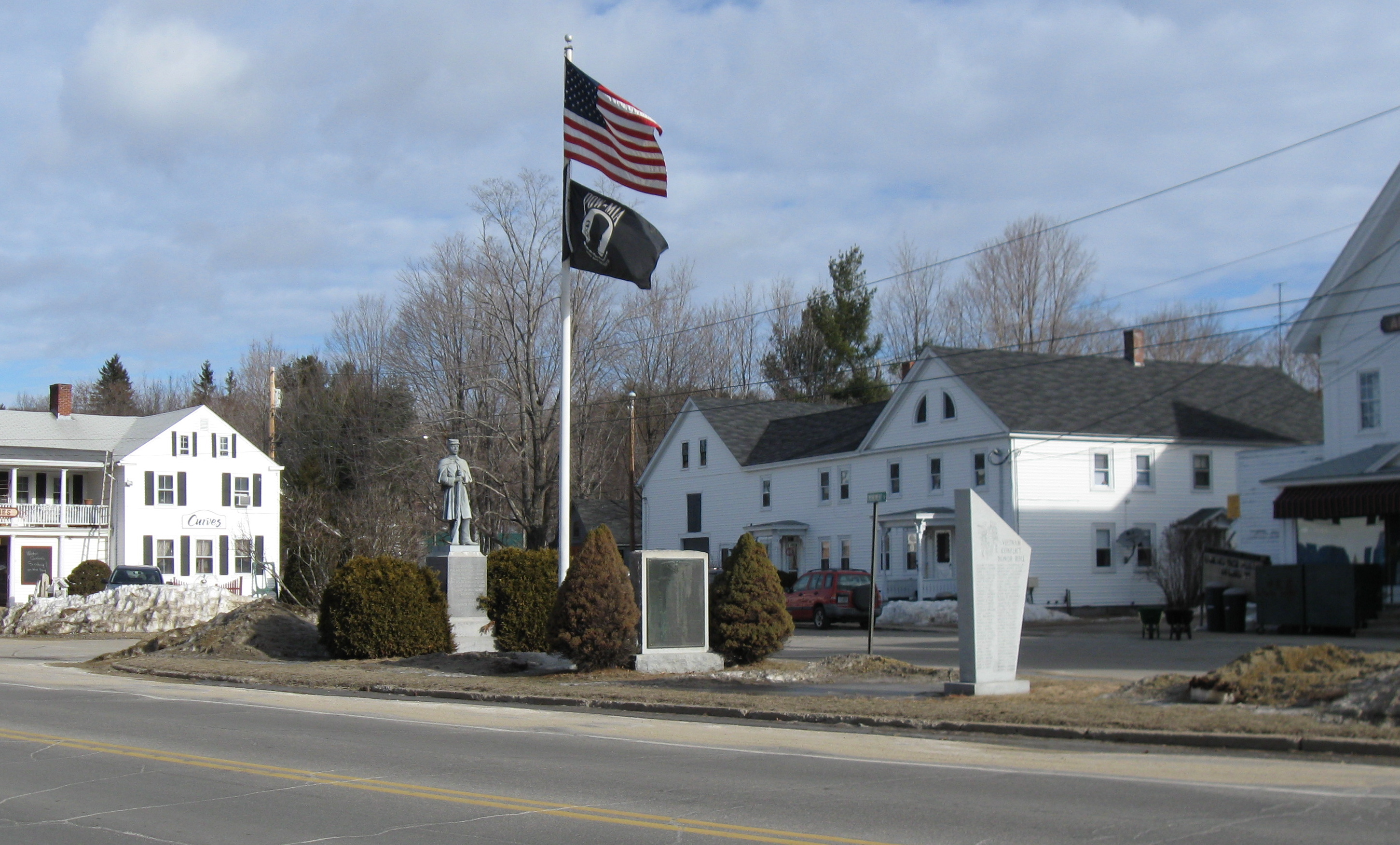
- Monument Square in the center of Alton

- Seal

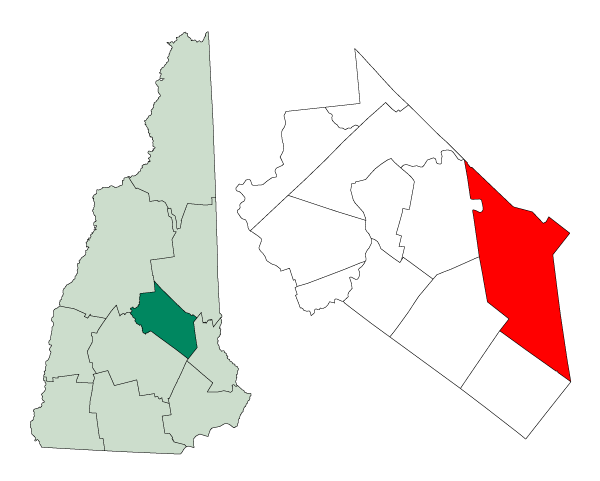
- Location in Belknap County, New Hampshire
- Coordinates: 43°27′8″N 71°13′3″W
- Country: United States
- State: New Hampshire
- County: Belknap
- Incorporated: 1796
- Villages: Alton; Alton Bay

Area
  - Total: 83.2 sq mi (215.4 km^{2})
  - Land: 63.7 sq mi (165.0 km^{2})
  - Water: 19.5 sq mi (50.5 km^{2}) 23.42%
- Elevation: 550 ft (170 m)

Population (2020)
  - Total: 5,894
  - Density: 92/sq mi (35.7/km^{2})
- Time zone: UTC−5 (Eastern)
  - Summer (DST): UTC−4 (Eastern)
- ZIP codes: 03809 (Alton); 03810 (Alton Bay)
- Area code: 603
- FIPS code: 33-01060
- GNIS feature ID: 873530
- Website: www.alton.nh.gov

Alton is a town in Belknap County, New Hampshire, United States. The population was 5,894 at the 2020 census, and an estimated 6,036 in 2025, up from 5,250 at the 2010 census. It is home to Alton Bay State Forest and Mount Major State Forest.

The primary settlement in town, where 499 people resided at the 2020 census, is defined by the U.S. Census Bureau as the Alton census-designated place (CDP) and is centered on the intersection of New Hampshire Route 11 and New Hampshire Route 140. The town also includes the village of Alton Bay, a long-time resort located beside Lake Winnipesaukee.

== History ==
Originally called "New Durham Gore" because of rocky upland areas, or "gores", the town was settled in 1770, mainly by farmers because the highland areas provided less frost. Merchants then filled the lowlands. Early Alton history recounts stories of the merchants trying to convince the farmers to incorporate. They would succeed on January 15, 1796, when the community was named after Alton, a small market town in Hampshire, England.

Alton was part of Strafford County until Belknap County was erected on December 22, 1840. By 1840, the village of Alton existed at the town's center. In 1847, the Cochecho Railroad began bringing passengers and freight to Alton Village and Alton Bay. By 1859, the town had two gristmills, seven sawmills, and five shoe factories. But the most famous business was the Rockwell Clough Company, established by William Rockwell Clough, inventor of the corkscrew. By 1903, his company was producing 30 million corkscrews worldwide.

Since the mid-19th century, however, tourism has been the principal business. In 1863, an Adventist group held a camp meeting at Alton Bay, which was the terminus of the Dover and Winnipiseogee Railroad. That was incorporated as the Alton Bay Camp Meeting Association (now known as Alton Bay Christian Conference Center) in 1876. In 1872, the Boston & Maine Railroad launched at Alton Bay the steamer Mount Washington, the first side-wheeler and largest vessel on Lake Winnipesaukee. When destroyed by fire in 1939, a replacement ship was found, also christened Mount Washington. Today, it continues to carry summer tourists between stops on the lake. The railway survived until 1935, and the old station at Alton Bay is now a community center.

== Geography ==
According to the United States Census Bureau, the town has a total area of 83.2 square miles (215.4 km^{2}), of which 63.7 square miles (165.0 km^{2}) are land and 19.5 square miles (50.5 km^{2}) are water, comprising 23.4% of the town. Alton is located at the southern end of Lake Winnipesaukee, around the 4-mile-long (6.4 km) inlet known as Alton Bay. The village of Alton Bay is located at the southern tip of the bay, while the main village of Alton is located 1 mile (1.6 km) farther south. The town is drained by the Merrymeeting River, the main inlet to Alton Bay. Mount Major, in Mount Major State Forest, has an elevation of 1,780 feet (540 m) above sea level. Popular with hikers, the summit offers unsurpassed views of Lake Winnipesaukee. The highest point in Alton is the north peak of Straightback Mountain, at 1,910 ft (580 m), just west of Mount Major. Both mountains are part of the Belknap Mountains range. Alton lies almost fully within the Merrimack River watershed, though a tiny corner is in the Piscataqua River (coastal) watershed.

The town is served by five state highways. New Hampshire Route 11 passes through the center of town, leading northwest along the shore of Lake Winnipesaukee to Gilford and thence to Laconia, and southeast to Rochester. New Hampshire Route 28 also passes through the center of town, leading north to Wolfeboro and south to Pittsfield and Manchester. New Hampshire Route 140 leads from Alton west to Gilmanton and Tilton. New Hampshire Route 11A leaves NH 11 in West Alton and goes west into Gilford, and New Hampshire Route 28A forms an alternate route north from Alton Bay to NH 28.

=== Adjacent municipalities ===
- Wolfeboro (north)
- New Durham (east)
- Barnstead (south)
- Gilmanton (southeast)
- Gilford (west)
- Tuftonboro (northwest)

== Demographics ==
Historical population
Census	Pop.	Note	%±
1790	445		—
1800	721		62.0%
1810	1,279		77.4%
1820	2,058		60.9%
1830	1,993		−3.2%
1840	2,002		0.5%
1850	1,795		−10.3%
1860	2,018		12.4%
1870	1,768		−12.4%
1880	1,476		−16.5%
1890	1,372		−7.0%
1900	1,500		9.3%
1910	1,348		−10.1%
1920	1,221		−9.4%
1930	1,261		3.3%
1940	1,209		−4.1%
1950	1,189		−1.7%
1960	1,241		4.4%
1970	1,647		32.7%
1980	2,440		48.1%
1990	3,286		34.7%
2000	4,502		37.0%
2010	5,250		16.6%
2020	5,894		12.3%
2024 (est.)	6,051	▲	2.7%
U.S. Decennial Census

As of the census of 2010, there were 5,250 people, 2,145 households, and 1,511 families residing in the town. There were 4,281 housing units, of which 2,136, or 49.9%, were vacant. 1,928 of the vacant units were for seasonal use. The racial makeup of the town was 98.4% white, 0.1% African American, 0.1% Native American, 0.3% Asian, 0.04% Native Hawaiian or Pacific Islander, 0.2% some other race, and 0.9% from two or more races. 1.1% of the population were Hispanic or Latino of any race.

Of the 2,145 households, 28.4% had children under the age of 18 living with them, 59.0% were headed by married couples living together, 6.9% had a female householder with no husband present, and 29.6% were non-families. 22.7% of all households were made up of individuals, and 9.5% were someone living alone who was 65 years of age or older. The average household size was 2.45, and the average family size was 2.87.

In the town, 21.1% of the population were under the age of 18, 6.2% were from 18 to 24, 20.9% from 25 to 44, 34.9% from 45 to 64, and 16.9% were 65 years of age or older. The median age was 46.2 years. For every 100 females, there were 100.8 males. For every 100 females age 18 and over, there were 99.3 males.

For the period 2011–2015, the estimated median annual income for a household was $66,823, and the median income for a family was $85,556. Male full-time workers had a median income of $46,223 versus $42,448 for females. The per capita income for the town was $29,693. 6.9% of the population and 4.6% of families were below the poverty line. 1.6% of the population under the age of 18 and 9.2% of those 65 or older were living in poverty.

== Government ==
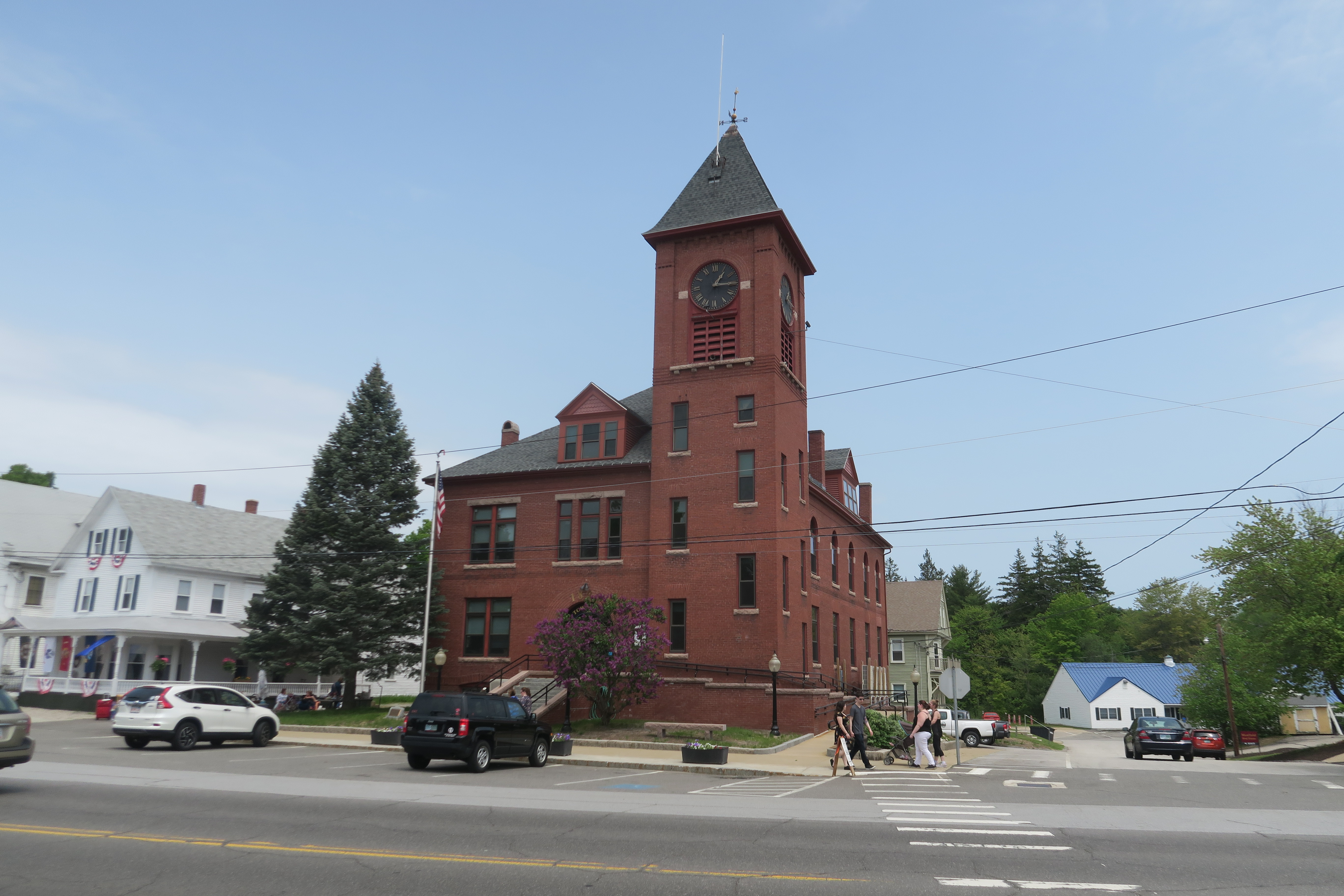
Alton Town Hall

In the New Hampshire Senate, Alton is in the 6th District, represented by Republican James Gray. In the New Hampshire House of Representatives, Alton is in the Belknap 7th district, represented by Republicans Barbara Comtois, Paul Terry, and Peter Varney. On the Executive Council of New Hampshire, Alton is in the 1st District, represented by Republican Joseph Kenney. In the United States House of Representatives, Alton is in New Hampshire's 1st congressional district, represented by Democrat Chris Pappas.

Alton is served by a full-time police department and a combination full-time and on-call fire/rescue department which also provides ambulance services for the town.

== Education ==
Alton is home to Prospect Mountain High School.

== Sites of interest ==
- Alton Historical Society & Museum
- Harold S. Gilman Museum
- Alton Bay, with an arcade, mini-golf, ice cream shop, multiple areas to eat, a marina, and other attractions
  - New Hampshire Historical Marker No. 164: Alton Bay Transportation Center
  - New Hampshire Historical Marker No. 288: The Alton Bay Water Bandstand

== Historic photos ==
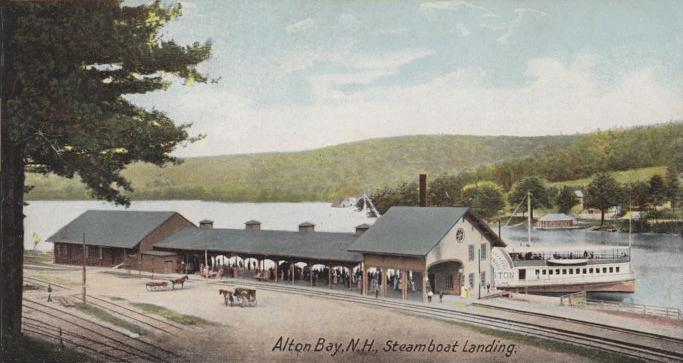
Steamer landing in 1905

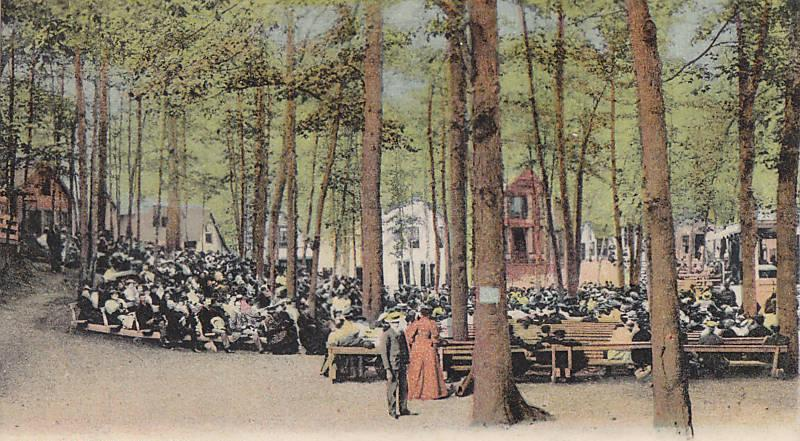
Advent Grove in 1910

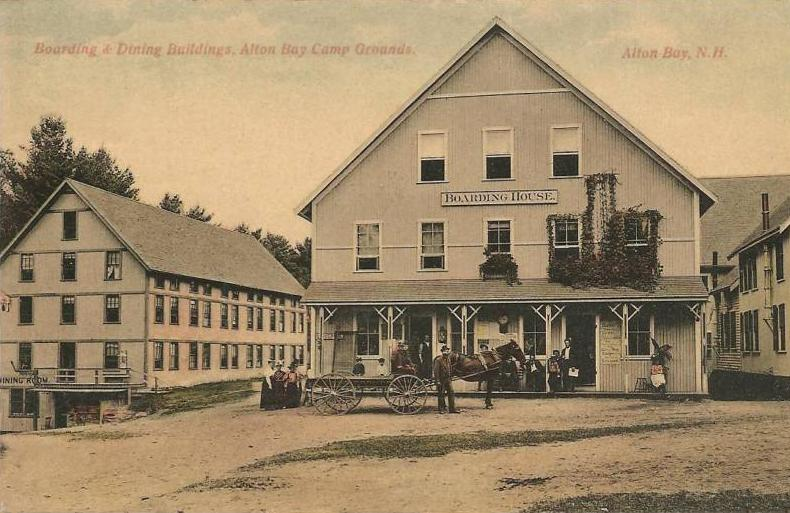
Boarding house in 1907

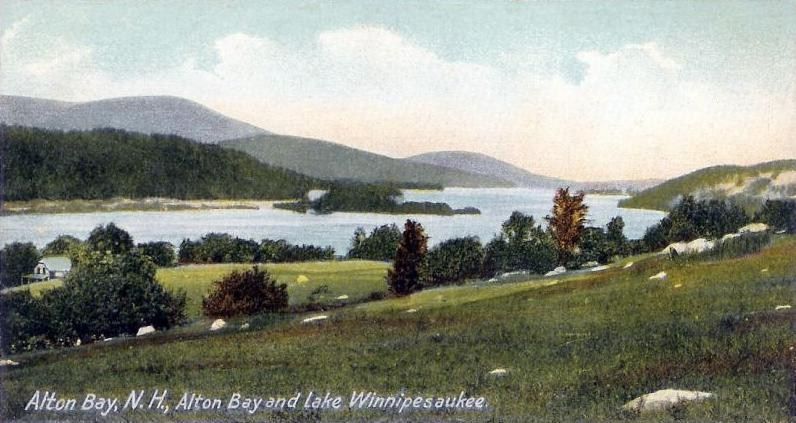
Alton Bay and Lake Winnipesaukee in 1905

== Notable people ==
- Joel Bean (1825–1914), founder of Beanite Quakerism
- George Franklin Drew (1827–1900), 12th governor of Florida
- James B. French (1857–1932), member of the Wisconsin State Assembly
- Florence Holway (1915–2012), rape victim, subject of a 2003 HBO documentary
- Steve Leach (born 1966), right wing with seven NHL teams
- Don Sweeney (born 1966), defenseman with the Boston Bruins and Dallas Stars
