= Glen Aldrich =

American politician

Member of the New Hampshire House of Representatives from the Belknap 6th district
- Incumbent
- Assumed office December 4, 2024 Serving with Harry Bean (2024–present), Russell Dumais (2024–present), David Nagel (2024–present)
- Preceded by: Richard Beaudoin

Member of the New Hampshire House of Representatives from the Belknap 2nd district
- In office December 3, 2014 – December 7, 2022 Serving with Herb Vadney (2014–2018), Russell Dumais (2014–2016), George F. Hurt (2014–2016), Marc Abear (2016–2018), Norman Silber (2016–2018, 2020–2022), Deanna Jurius (2018–2020), Harry Bean (2018–2022), Jonathan Mackie (2018–2022)
- Preceded by: Colette Worsman; Lisa DiMartino; Robert Greemore, Jr
- Succeeded by: Lisa Smart; Matthew Coker

Personal details
- Born: December 20, 1957 (age 68)
- Party: Republican
- Children: 3
- Education: Shawnee High School

Glen Aldrich (born December 20, 1957) is a New Hampshire politician.

Aldrich graduated from Shawnee High School.

On November 4, 2014, Aldrich was first elected to the New Hampshire House of Representatives where he represents the Belknap 2 district. Aldrich first assumed office on December 3, 2014. Aldrich is a Republican. In 2022, Aldrich was one of 13 Republicans to vote for a constitutional amendment to secede New Hampshire from United States. Aldrich was defeated in his 2022 attempt at re-election in the Republican primary.

Aldrich is married and has three children. He resides in Gilford, New Hampshire.
