= Herb Vadney =

American politician

Member of the New Hampshire House of Representatives from the Belknap 2nd district
- In office December 5, 2012 – December 5, 2018 Serving with Colette Worsman (2012–2014), Lisa DiMartino (2012–2014), Robert Greemore, Jr (2012–2014), Russell Dumais (2014–2016), George Hurt (2014–2016), Glen Aldrich (2014–2018), Marc Abear (2016–2018), Norm Silber (2016–2018)
- Preceded by: Bill Tobin; Dennis Fields
- Succeeded by: Deanna Jurius; Harry Bean; Jonathan Mackie

Personal details
- Party: Republican

Herbert R. "Herb" Vadney is an American politician from New Hampshire. He served in the New Hampshire House of Representatives.

Vadney was a member of the board of selectmen in Meredith, New Hampshire.
