= 2022 New Hampshire House of Representatives election in Belknap County =

- November 8, 2022

All 18 seats representing Belknap County in the New Hampshire House of Representatives
	Majority party	Minority party
Party	Republican	Democratic
Last election	18 seats	0 seats
Seats before	17	0
Seats after	15	3
Seat change	▼3	▲3

For 2022 New Hampshire House of Representatives election in Belknap County, all 18 out of 400 seats representing Belknap County in New Hampshire House of Representatives were up for election.

== Detailed results ==
- Source for Republican primary results, Belknap County:
- Source for Democratic primary results, Belknap County:
- Reference for general election results, Belknap County:

=== Belknap 1 ===
- Elects one representative

Republican primary

Belknap 1 Republican primary
Party	Candidate	Votes	%
Republican	Tom Ploszaj (incumbent)	479	98.6
Democratic	Sean Kavanaugh (write-in)	2	0.4
Write-in	Misc. Write-ins	5	1.0
Total votes		486	100.0

Democratic primary

Belknap 1 Democratic primary
Party	Candidate	Votes	%
Democratic	Sean Kavanaugh	249	99.6
Republican	Tom Ploszaj (incumbent) (write-in)	1	0.4
Total votes		250	100.0

General election

Belknap 1 general election, 2022
Party	Candidate	Votes	%
Republican	Tom Ploszaj (incumbent)	1,053	54.1
Democratic	Sean Kavanaugh	892	45.8
Write-in	Write-ins	3	0.2
Total votes		1,948	100.0

=== Belknap 2 ===
- Elects two representatives

Republican primary

Belknap 2 Republican primary
Party	Candidate	Votes	%
Republican	Cindy Creteau-Miller	555	34.5
Republican	Lisa Smart	531	33.0
Republican	Jeanne Tofts	524	32.4
Total votes		1,610	100.0

Democratic primary

Belknap 2 Democratic primary
Party	Candidate	Votes	%
Democratic	Sandra Mucci	362	54.5
Democratic	Matthew Coker	300	45.2
Republican	Cindy Creteau-Miller (write-in)	1	0.15
Republican	Lisa Smart (write-in)	1	0.15
Total votes		664	100.0

General election

Belknap 2 general election, 2022
Party	Candidate	Votes	%
Republican	Lisa Smart	1,649	25.4
Democratic	Matthew Coker	1,581	24.3
Democratic	Sandra Mucci	1,546	23.8
Republican	Cindy Creteau-Miller	1,445	22.2
Republican	Jeanne Tofts (write-in)	272	4.2
Write-in	Misc. Write-ins	4	0.1
Total votes		6,497	100.0

=== Belknap 3 ===
- Elects one representative

Republican primary

Belknap 3 Republican primary
Party	Candidate	Votes	%
Republican	Juliet Harvey-Bolia (incumbent)	512	57.3
Republican	Scott Morrow	377	42.2
Write-in	Write-ins	4	4.5
Total votes		893	100.0

Democratic primary

Belknap 3 Democratic primary
Party	Candidate	Votes	%
Democratic	Sheryl Anderson	397	99.5
Republican	Juliet Harvey-Bolia (incumbent) (write-in)	1	0.25
Republican	Scott Morrow (write-in)	1	0.25
Total votes		399	100.0

General election

Belknap 3 general election, 2022
Party	Candidate	Votes	%
Republican	Juliet Harvey-Bolia (incumbent)	1,817	57.4
Democratic	Sheryl Anderson	1,347	42.6
Total votes		3,164	100.0

=== Belknap 4 ===
- Elects one representative

Republican primary

Belknap 4 Republican primary
Party	Candidate	Votes	%
Republican	Travis O'Hara (incumbent)	721	67.95
Republican	Mike Sylvia (incumbent)	329	31.01
Democratic	Justin Borden (write-in)	4	0.38
Write-in	Misc. Write-ins	7	0.66
Total votes		1,061	100.0

Democratic primary

Belknap 4 Democratic primary
Party	Candidate	Votes	%
Democratic	Justin Borden	234	92.5
Republican	Travis O'Hara (incumbent) (write-in)	13	5.1
Republican	Mike Sylvia (incumbent) (write-in)	1	0.4
Write-in	Misc. Write-ins	5	2.0
Total votes		253	100.0

General election

Belknap 4 general election, 2022
Party	Candidate	Votes	%
Republican	Travis O'Hara (incumbent)	2,021	65.7
Democratic	Justin Borden	1,048	34.1
Write-in	Write-ins	6	0.2
Total votes		3,075	100.0

=== Belknap 5 ===
- Elects four representatives

Republican primary

Belknap 5 Republican primary
Party	Candidate	Votes	%
Republican	Mike Bordes (incumbent)	1,333	25.95
Republican	Steven Bogert	1,097	21.35
Republican	Richard Littlefield (incumbent)	1,091	21.24
Republican	Dawn Johnson (incumbent)	804	15.65
Republican	Erica Golter	744	14.48
Democratic	David Huot	11	0.21
Democratic	Patrick Wood	9	0.18
Democratic	Charlie St. Clair	6	0.12
Democratic	Eric Hoffman	2	0.04
Write-in	Misc. Write-ins	40	0.78
Total votes		5,137	100.0

Democratic primary

Belknap 5 Democratic primary
Party	Candidate	Votes	%
Democratic	David Huot	698	26.18
Democratic	Patrick Wood	672	25.20
Democratic	Charlie St. Clair	669	25.09
Democratic	Eric Hoffman	610	22.88
Republican	Steven Bogert (write-in)	5	0.19
Republican	Mike Bordes (incumbent) (write-in)	4	0.15
Republican	Richard Littlefield (incumbent) (write-in)	1	0.04
Republican	Dawn Johnson (incumbent) (write-in)	1	0.04
Republican	Erica Golter (write-in)	1	0.04
Write-in	Misc.Write-ins	5	0.19
Total votes		2,666	100.0

General election

Belknap 5 general election, 2022
Party	Candidate	Votes	%
Republican	Mike Bordes (incumbent)	3,099	14.24
Democratic	Charlie St. Clair	2,893	13.29
Democratic	David Huot	2,762	12.69
Republican	Steven Bogert	2,714	12.47
Republican	Richard Littlefield (incumbent)	2,676	12.29
Democratic	Patrick Wood	2,633	12.10
Democratic	Eric Hoffman	2,494	11.46
Republican	Dawn Johnson (incumbent)	2,478	11.38
Write-in	Write-ins	17	0.08
Total votes		21,766	100.0

=== Belknap 6 ===
- Elects four representatives

Republican primary

Belknap 6 Republican primary
Party	Candidate	Votes	%
Republican	Harry Bean (incumbent)	1,822	22.78
Republican	Russell Dumais	1,433	17.92
Republican	David Nagel	1,274	15.93
Republican	Richard Beaudoin	1,129	14.12
Republican	Gregg Hough (incumbent)	941	11.77
Republican	Glen Aldrich (incumbent)	786	9.83
Republican	Norm Silber (incumbent)	579	7.24
Democratic	Lisa DiMartino (write-in)	10	0.13
Democratic	Bob McLean (write-in)	5	0.06
Democratic	Dana Hackett (write-in)	1	0.01
Democratic	Edward Cracraft (write-in)	1	0.01
Write-in	Misc. Write-ins	17	0.21
Total votes		7,998	100.0

Democratic primary

Belknap 6 Democratic primary
Party	Candidate	Votes	%
Democratic	Lisa DiMartino	752	27.29
Democratic	Dana Hackett	680	24.67
Democratic	Bob McLean	675	24.45
Democratic	Edward Cracraft	610	22.13
Republican	David Nagel (write-in)	13	0.47
Republican	Harry Bean (incumbent) (write-in)	9	0.33
Republican	Russell Dumais (write-in)	7	0.25
Republican	Richard Beaudoin (write-in)	6	0.22
Republican	Gregg Hough (incumbent) (write-in)	3	0.11
Republican	Glen Aldrich (incumbent) (write-in)	1	0.04
Total votes		2,756	100.0

General election

Belknap 6 general election, 2022
Party	Candidate	Votes	%
Republican	Harry Bean (incumbent)	3,798	14.49
Republican	Russell Dumais	3,788	14.45
Republican	David Nagel	3,552	13.55
Republican	Richard Beaudoin	3,223	12.29
Democratic	Lisa DiMartino	3,219	12.28
Democratic	Bob McLean	2,909	11.10
Democratic	Dana Hackett	2,737	10.44
Democratic	Edward Cracraft	1,901	7.25
Independent	Kurt Webber	1,092	4.16
Total votes		26,219	100.0

=== Belknap 7 ===
- Elects three representatives

Republican primary

Belknap 7 Republican primary
Party	Candidate	Votes	%
Republican	Peter Varney (incumbent)	1,021	29.0
Republican	Paul Terry (incumbent)	899	25.5
Republican	Barbara Comtois (incumbent)	843	23.9
Republican	David Hershey	750	21.3
Write-in	Write-ins	12	0.3
Total votes		3,525	100.0

Democratic primary

Belknap 7 Democratic primary
Party	Candidate	Votes	%
Democratic	William O'Neil	406	46.9
Democratic	Stephen Copithorne	356	41.2
Democratic	Sherry Dumais (write-in)	73	8.4
Republican	David Hershey (write-in)	11	1.3
Republican	Paul Terry (incumbent) (write-in)	1	0.1
Republican	Peter Varney (incumbent) (write-in)	1	0.1
Republican	Barbara Comtois (incumbent) (write-in)	1	0.1
Write-in	Other write-ins	16	1.8
Total votes		865	100.0

General election

Belknap 7 general election, 2022
Party	Candidate	Votes	%
Republican	Peter Varney (incumbent)	2,999	20.63
Republican	Barbara Comtois (incumbent)	2,992	20.58
Republican	Paul Terry (incumbent)	2,966	20.40
Democratic	Sherry Dumais	1,951	13.42
Democratic	William O'Neil	1,853	12.75
Democratic	Stephen Copithorne	1,774	12.20
Write-in	Write-ins	3	0.02
Total votes		14,538	100.0

=== Belknap 8 ===
- Elects two representatives

Republican primary

Belknap 8 Republican primary
Party	Candidate	Votes	%
Republican	Douglas Trottier (incumbent)	1,264	54.1
Republican	Nikki McCarter	1,057	45.3
Democratic	Don House (write-in)	3	0.1
Write-in	Misc. Write-ins	11	0.5
Total votes		2,335	100.0

Democratic primary

Belknap 8 Democratic primary
Party	Candidate	Votes	%
Democratic	Don House	530	54.8
Democratic	George Condodemetraky	413	42.7
Republican	Nikki McCarter (write-in)	8	0.8
Republican	Douglas Trottier (incumbent) (write-in)	5	0.5
Write-in	Misc. Write-ins	11	1.1
Total votes		967	100.0

General election

Belknap 8 general election, 2022
Party	Candidate	Votes	%
Republican	Douglas Trottier (incumbent)	3,542	32.5
Republican	Nikki McCarter	3,068	28.1
Democratic	Don House	2,426	22.2
Democratic	George Condodemetraky	1,860	17.1
Write-in	Write-ins	13	0.1
Total votes		10,909	100.0
