= Marc Abear =

American politician

Member of the New Hampshire House of Representatives from the Belknap 2nd district
- In office December 7, 2016 – December 5, 2018 Serving with Glen Aldrich, Herb Vadney, Norman Silber
- Preceded by: Russell Dumais; George F. Hurt
- Succeeded by: Deanna Jurius; Harry Bean; Jonathan Mackie

Personal details
- Party: Republican

Marc Abear is an American politician from New Hampshire. He served in the New Hampshire House of Representatives.

Abear endorsed the Ron DeSantis 2024 presidential campaign.
