= 2024 New Hampshire Republican presidential primary =

- January 23, 2024

22 Republican National Convention delegates
- Turnout: TBA

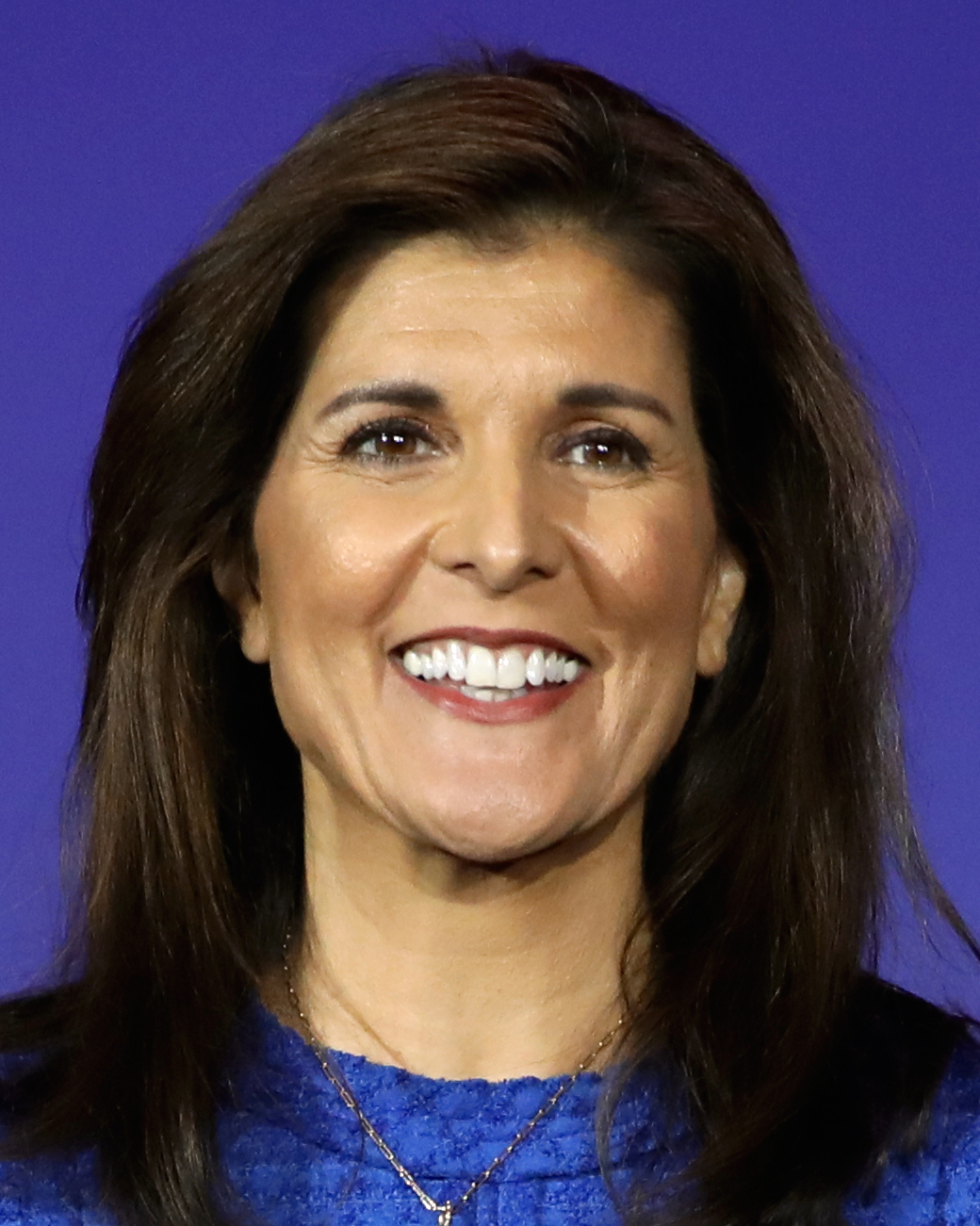
| Candidate | Donald Trump | Nikki Haley |
| Home state | Florida | South Carolina |
| Delegate count | 13 | 9 |
| Popular vote | 176,392 | 140,288 |
| Percentage | 54.35% | 43.28% |

Trump
40 – 50%
50 – 60%
60 – 70%
70 – 80%
Haley
40 – 50%
50 – 60%
60 – 70%
70 – 80%
80 – 90%
100%
Tie/No Votes
40 – 50%
No votes

The 2024 New Hampshire Republican presidential primary was held on January 23, 2024, as part of the Republican Party primaries for the 2024 presidential election.

22 delegates to the 2024 Republican National Convention were allocated on a proportional basis, as long as the candidate received at least 10% of the statewide vote. Any leftover delegates were to be added to the candidate that receives the most votes in the primary. The New Hampshire primary was the second contest in the nation, held after the Iowa caucuses. The primary was won by former President Donald Trump, defeating former U.N. Ambassador and South Carolina governor Nikki Haley.

After most polls closed at 8:00 PM EST, media outlets began projecting a win for Trump. Trump's eleven-point lead wound up equating to an edge just under 36,000 votes. Despite calls to drop out, Haley declined to withdraw from the race after the primary. Haley swept the resort town of Dixville Notch which was the first place in the nation to vote in the 2024 primaries, winning all six votes. Trump became the first non-incumbent Republican candidate in American history to win both the Iowa caucuses and the New Hampshire primary in the same election cycle. Trump also broke the record of number of votes received for any candidate in New Hampshire primary history.

== Background ==
Donald Trump won the 2016 New Hampshire Republican primary with 35.2% of the vote, with closest opponent John Kasich coming in second with 15.7% of the vote. Exit polling by Edison Research concluded that Trump's 2016 primary victory could be credited to support among white voters without a college degree, as well as support from moderate voters.

== Procedure ==
Delegates are proportionally allocated to candidates who received at least 10% of the statewide vote.

== Candidates ==
The following candidates officially filed by the end of the filing deadline on October 27, 2023:

- Scott Alan Ayers
- Ryan L. Binkley
- Robert S Carney Jr.
- John Anthony Castro
- Nikki Haley
- Peter Jedick
- Donald Kjornes
- Mary Maxwell
- Glenn J. McPeters
- Scott Peterson Merrell
- Darius L. Mitchell
- Sam Sloan
- David Stuckenberg
- Rachel Swift
- Donald Trump
- Perry Johnson (withdrew October 20)
- Mike Pence (withdrew October 28)
- Tim Scott (withdrew November 12)
- Hirsh V. Singh (withdrew October 31)
- Doug Burgum (withdrew December 4)
- Chris Christie (withdrew January 10)
- Vivek Ramaswamy (withdrew January 15)
- Asa Hutchinson (withdrew January 16)
- Ron DeSantis (withdrew January 21)

== Campaign ==
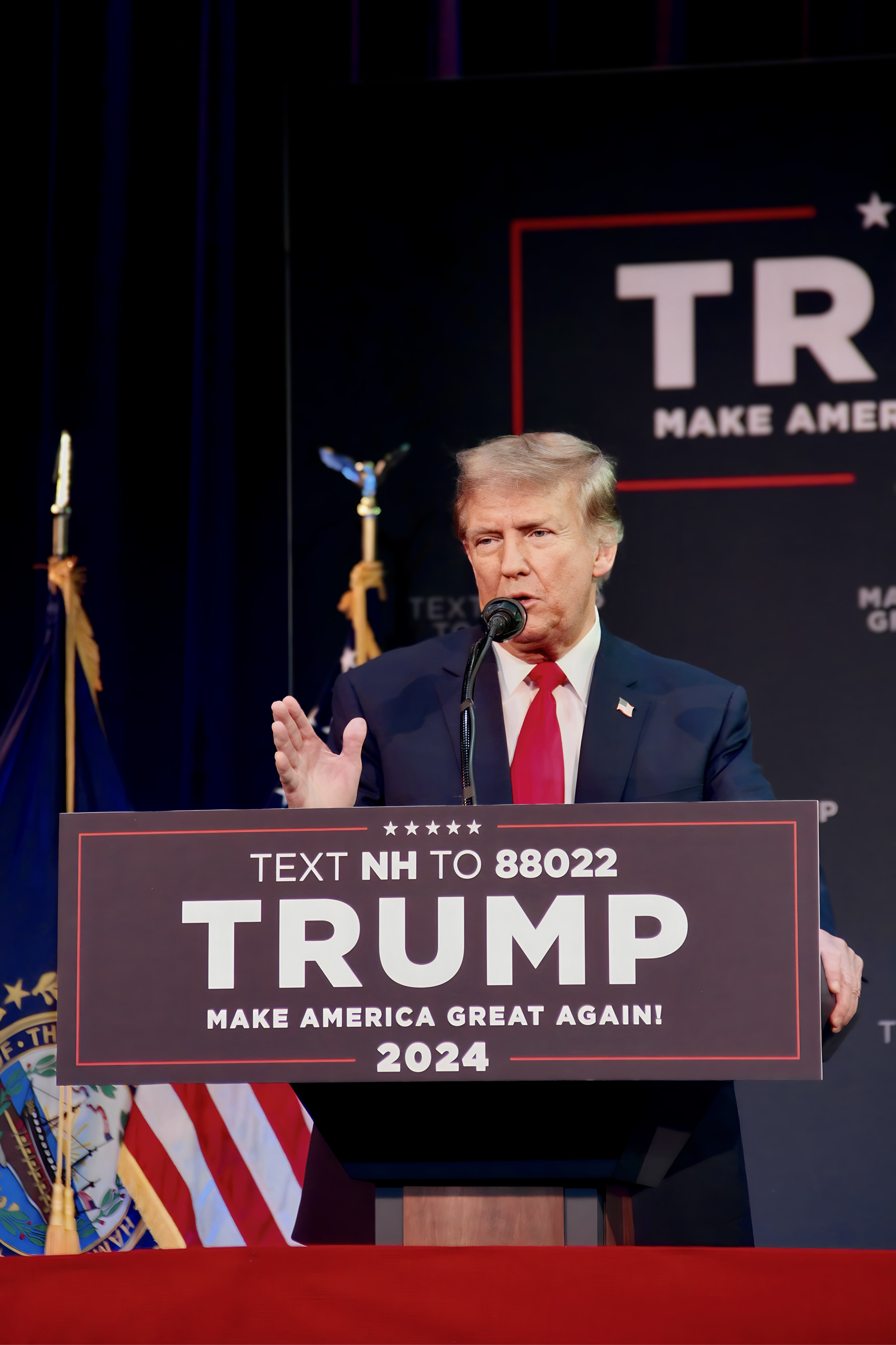
Trump holds campaign rally in Rochester, New Hampshire.

In January 2023, Trump selected outgoing New Hampshire Republican Party chair Stephen Stepanek to oversee his campaign's operations in the state.

Nikki Haley's campaign purchased $10 million worth of ads to run in New Hampshire and Iowa beginning in December 2023.

New Hampshire Governor Chris Sununu, who considered a presidential candidacy, established a "Live Free or Die committee", though he announced on June 5 that he would not be running for the Republican nomination.

== Endorsements ==
Endorsements by incumbent Republicans in the New Hampshire Senate.
Endorsed Ron DeSantis (1) (withdrawn)
Endorsed Nikki Haley (1)
Endorsed Donald Trump (1)
No endorsement (11)

Endorsements by incumbent Republicans in the New Hampshire House of Representatives.
Endorsed Donald Trump (51)
Endorsed Ron DeSantis (26) (withdrawn)
Endorsed Vivek Ramaswamy (7) (withdrawn)
Endorsed Nikki Haley (3)
Endorsed Larry Elder (1) (withdrawn)
No endorsement (110)
Non-Republicans (202)
Nikki Haley

Governor

- Chris Sununu, Governor of New Hampshire (2017–2025)
- John H. Sununu, Governor of New Hampshire (1983–1989), White House Chief of Staff (1989–1991)

U.S. Senators

- Judd Gregg, (1993–2011)
- John E. Sununu, (2003–2009), U.S. Representative from NH-01 (1997–2003)

State Senator

- Bill Gannon, New Hampshire State Senator from the 23rd district (2016–2018, 2020–present)

State Representative

- Michael Moffett, Merrimack's District 4 (2022–present), Merrimack's District 9 (2016–2018, 2020–2022)

Mayor

- George Hansel, Keene (2020–2024)

Notable Individual

- Don Bolduc, retired U.S. Army brigadier general and Republican nominee for U.S. Senator from New Hampshire in 2022
Donald Trump

Former federal official

- Karoline Leavitt, White House Assistant Press Secretary (2020); Republican nominee for New Hampshire's 1st congressional district in 2022

Former U.S. Senator

- Bob Smith, (1990–2003)

State Senators

- Kevin Avard, 12th district (2014–2018, 2020–present)
- Chuck Morse, President of the New Hampshire Senate (2013–2018, 2020–2022) and candidate for U.S. Senate in 2022

State Representative

- Phyllis Katsakiores, Rockingham 6th (2014–present), Rockingham 5th (1984–2012)

Notable individual

- Stephen Stepanek, chair of the New Hampshire Republican Party (2019–2023)

=== Withdrawn candidates ===
Chris Christie (withdrawn)

Former U.S. Representative

- Charles Bass, U.S. Representative from NH-02 (1995–2007, 2011–2013)

Former State Representative

- J.P. Marzullo, Hillsborough's District 2 (2018–2020)
Larry Elder (withdrawn)

State legislator

- Julius Soti, New Hampshire State Representative from Rockingham's 35th district (2022–present)
Ron DeSantis (withdrawn)

State Representatives

- Jason Osborne, Rockingham's District 4 (2014–present); Majority Leader (2020–present)
- Lisa Smart, Belknap's District 2 (2022–2024)
- Travis O'Hara, Belknap's 4th district (2022–present)
- Matthew Simon, Grafton's District 1 (2020–2024)
- Linda Camarota, Hillsborough's District 7 (2018–2020)
- Brian Cole, Hillsborough's District 26 (2022–present) (previously endorsed Donald Trump)
- James Spillane, Rockingham's District 2 (2014–present) (previously endorsed Donald Trump)
- Katherine Prudhomme O'Brien, Rockingham's District 13 (2018–present)
- Joe Guthrie, Rockingham's District 15 (2022–present)
- Tom Dolan, Rockingham's District 16 (2018–present)
- Kristine Perez, Rockingham's District 16 (2022–present) (previously endorsed Donald Trump)
- Debra DeSimone, Rockingham's District 18 (2022–present) (previously endorsed Donald Trump)
- Tim Comerford, Rockingham's District 33 (2008–2014)
- Walter Spilsbury, Sullivan's District 3 (2022–present)
Vivek Ramaswamy (withdrawn)

State representatives

- Richard Brown, Carroll's District 3 (2022–present)
- Fred Doucette, Rockingham's District 25 (2014–2025); Deputy Majority Leader (2020–2025)
- David Love, Rockingham's District 13 (2022–present) and District 6 (2018–2022)
- Mark McLean, Hillsborough's District 15 (2022–present), District 44 (2017–2022), and District 14 (2014–2016)
- Fred Plett, Hillsborough's District 29 (2022–present) and Hillsborough District 6 (2018–2022)
- David Rochefort, Grafton's District 1 (2022–present)
- Susan Vandecasteele, Rockingham's District 25 (2022–present) and District 8 (2020–2022)
- Peter Varney, Belknap's District 7 (2022–present)

== Polling ==
Local regression graph of all polls conducted since November 2022.

Aggregate polls

| Source of poll aggregation | Dates administered | Dates updated | Nikki Haley | Donald Trump | Other/ Undecided (Note: Calculated by taking the difference of 100% and all other candidates combined.) | Margin |
|---|---|---|---|---|---|---|
| 270 to Win | January 22–23, 2024 | January 23, 2024 | 35.7% | 56.5% | 7.8% (Note: Ron DeSantis 7.3%) | Trump +20.8 |
| FiveThirtyEight | Through January 22, 2024 | January 23, 2024 | 36.3% | 53.9% | 9.8% | Trump +17.6 |
| RealClearPolling | January 16–22, 2024 | January 23, 2024 | 36.5% | 55.8% | 7.7% | Trump +19.3 |
| Average | | | 36.2% | 55.4% | 8.4% | Trump +19.2 |

| Poll source | Date(s) administered | Sample size (Note: Key: A – all adults RV – registered voters LV – likely voters V – unclear) | Margin of error | Doug Burgum | Chris Christie | Ron DeSantis | Nikki Haley | Asa Hutchinson | Mike Pence | Vivek Ramaswamy | Tim Scott | Donald Trump | Other | Undecided |
|---|---|---|---|---|---|---|---|---|---|---|---|---|---|---|
| Suffolk University/Boston Globe/WBTS | Jan 21–22, 2024 | 500 (LV) | ± 4.4% | – | – | – | 38% | – | – | – | – | 60% | 1% | 1% |
| Insider Advantage | January 21, 2024 | 850 (LV) | ±4.32% | – | – | – | 35% | – | – | – | – | 62% | – | 3% |
| Suffolk University/Boston Globe/WBTS | Jan 20–21, 2024 | 500 (LV) | ± 4.4% | – | – | – | 38% | – | – | – | – | 57% | 2% | 2% |
| Suffolk University/Boston Globe/WBTS | Jan 19–20, 2024 | 500 (LV) | ± 4.4% | – | – | 6% | 36% | – | – | – | – | 55% | 0.6% | 2.4% |
| American Research Group | Jan 18–20, 2024 | 600 (LV) | ±4.0% | – | – | 6% | 44% | – | – | – | – | 46% | – | – |
| Emerson College/WHDH | Jan 18–20, 2024 | 673 (RV) | ±3.7% | – | – | 8% | 35% | | | | | 50% | | 7% |
| CNN/University of New Hampshire | January 16–19, 2024 | 1,242 (LV) | ± 2.8% | – | – | 6% | 39% | – | – | – | – | 50% | 3% | 2% |
| Suffolk University/Boston Globe/WBTS | Jan 17–18, 2024 | 500 (LV) | ± 4.4% | – | – | 6% | 35% | – | – | – | – | 52% | – | 4% |
| Suffolk University/Boston Globe/WBTS | Jan 16–17, 2024 | 500 (LV) | ± 4.4% | – | – | 6% | 36% | – | – | – | – | 50% | 1% | 4% |
| Saint Anselm College | January 16, 2024 | 1,398 (LV) | ± 2.6% | – | – | 6% | 38% | – | – | – | – | 52% | – | 4% |
| Suffolk University/Boston Globe/WBTS | Jan 15–16, 2024 | 500 (LV) | ± 4.4% | – | – | 5% | 34% | – | – | – | – | 50% | – | 11% |
| American Research Group | Jan 12–15, 2024 | 600 (LV) | ± 4.0% | – | – | 4% | 40% | 1% | – | 4% | – | 40% | 2% | 9% |
| Saint Anselm College | Jan 8–9, 2024 | 1,194 (LV) | ± 2.8% | – | 9% | 6% | 31% | – | – | 6% | – | 45% | – | 3% |
| University of New Hampshire Survey/CNN | Jan 4–8, 2024 | 919 (LV) | ± 3.2% | – | 12% | 5% | 32% | 0% | – | 8% | – | 39% | 0% | 5% |
| American Research Group | December 27, 2023 – January 4, 2024 | 600 (LV) | ± 4.0% | – | 10% | 5% | 33% | 1% | – | 4% | – | 37% | 1% | 9% |
| American Research Group | Dec 14–20, 2023 | 600 (LV) | ± 4.0% | – | 13% | 6% | 29% | 1% | – | 5% | – | 33% | 1% | 12% |
| Saint Anselm College | Dec 18–19, 2023 | 1,072 (LV) | ± 3.0% | – | 12% | 6% | 30% | 0% | – | 5% | – | 44% | – | 3% |
| University of Massachusetts Lowell/YouGov | Dec 7–18, 2023 | 450 (LV) | ± 5.4% | – | 6% | 10% | 22% | 1% | – | 4% | – | 52% | 0% (Note: "Another candidate" with 0%) | 5% |
| CBS News/YouGov | Dec 8–15, 2023 | 855 (LV) | ± 4.1% | – | 10% | 11% | 29% | 1% | – | 5% | – | 44% | – | – |
| Trafalgar Group | Dec 9–11, 2023 | 1,098 (LV) | ± 2.9% | – | 14% | 11% | 18% | 0% | – | 10% | – | 45% | – | 1% |
| Americans for Prosperity | Nov 19–21, 2023 | 800 (LV) | – | – | – | 9% | 25% | – | – | – | – | 40% | 26% | – |
| University of New Hampshire Survey Center/CNN | Nov 10–14, 2023 | 994 (LV) | ± 3.1% | 2% | 14% | 9% | 20% | 0% | – | 8% | – | 42% | 3% | 2% |
| Washington Post/Monmouth University | Nov 9–14, 2023 | 606 (LV) | ± 4.5% | 2% | 11% | 7% | 18% | 1% | – | 8% | 3% | 46% | 0% | 4% |
| Emerson College/WHDH | Nov 10–13, 2023 | 465 (RV) | ± 3.3% | 1.5% | 8.8% | 7.2% | 17.6% | 0.3% | – | 4.6% | 2.2% | 48.5% | – | 9.3% |
| USA TODAY/Boston Globe/Suffolk University | Sep 28 – October 2, 2023 | 500 (LV) | ± 4.4% | 1% | 6% | 10% | 19% | – | 1% | 4% | 4% | 49% | – | – |
| CBS News/YouGov | Sep 15–24, 2023 | 502 (LV) | ± 5.4% | 2% | 8% | 13% | 11% | 1% | 2% | 8% | 5% | 50% | 0% (Note: Larry Elder & Will Hurd with 0%) | – |
| Saint Anselm College | Sep 19–20, 2023 | 931 (LV) | ± 3.2% | 1% | 10% | 11% | 15% | 1% | 1% | 6% | 3% | 45% | 0% (Note: Larry Elder, Will Hurd & Perry Johnson with 0%) | 6% |
| Insider Advantage | September 20, 2023 | 850 (LV) | ± 3.36% | 4% | 10% | 8% | 14% | 1% | 1% | 5% | 5% | 42% | 1% (Note: Perry Johnson with 1%; Ryan Binkley, Larry Elder & Will Hurd with 0%) | 9% |
| University of New Hampshire | Sep 14–18, 2023 | 1,006 (LV) | ± 3.4% | 1% | 11% | 10% | 12% | 0% | 2% | 13% | 6% | 39% | 1% (Note: Will Hurd with 1%; Larry Elder & "Other" with 0%) | 6% |
| NMB Research | Aug 25–31, 2023 | 800 (LV) | – | 1% | 8% | 10% | 10% | 1% | 4% | 8% | 5% | 47% | <3% (Note: Larry Elder and Will Hurd with 1%; Refused 1%) | 4% |
| Fabrizio, Lee & Associates | Aug 25–28, 2023 | 500 (LV) | – | 2% | 5% | 11% | 9% | <1% | 1% | 9% | 5% | 48% | <3% (Note: Larry Elder and Will Hurd with 1%; Perry Johnson with <1%; Francis Suarez with 0%) | 9% |
| Echelon Insights (Note: Poll commissioned by Republican Main Street Partnership) | Aug 15–17, 2023 | 800 (LV) | ± 4.0% | 2% | 14% | 9% | 3% | 1% | 3% | 11% | 7% | 34% | 3% (Note: Will Hurd with 3%; Ryan Binkley, Larry Elder, and Francis Suarez with 0%) | 12% |
| Emerson College | Aug 9–11, 2023 | 498 (RV) | ± 4.9% | 4% | 9% | 8% | 4% | – | 1% | 3% | 6% | 49% | 3% (Note: Perry Johnson with 2%; Will Hurd with 1%) | 13% |
| co/efficient | Aug 5–7, 2023 | 862 (LV) | ± 3.3% | 4% | 9% | 9% | 7% | 1% | 3% | 5% | 5% | 43% | 3% (Note: "Someone else" with 3%) | 13% |
| Manhattan Institute | July 2023 | 603 (LV) | – | 3% | 11% | 13% | 7% | 1% | 4% | 8% | 7% | 34% | 3% (Note: "Someone else" with 2%; Francis Suarez with 1%; Larry Elder with 0%) | 8% |
| National Research (Note: Poll sponsored by American Greatness PAC, which supports Trump.) | Jul 25–26, 2023 | 500 (LV) | ± 4.4% | 5% | 8% | 11% | 3% | 1% | 2% | 6% | 8% | 41% | – | 15% |
| University of New Hampshire | Jul 13–17, 2023 | 898 (LV) | ± 3.3% | 6% | 6% | 23% | 5% | 0% | 1% | 5% | 8% | 37% | 1% (Note: Will Hurd with 1%; Francis Suarez with 0%) | 8% |
| National Research | Jul 10–12, 2023 | 500 (LV) | ± 4.4% | 3% | 7% | 15% | 5% | 1% | 1% | 4% | 6% | 39% | – | 17% |
| American Pulse | Jul 5–11, 2023 | 895 | ± 3.2% | 3% | 10% | 11% | 3% | – | 5% | 5% | 7% | 48% | – | 8% (Note: Calculated by subtracting the candidates' percentages from 100; the source does not give a number) |
| Saint Anselm College | Jun 21–23, 2023 | 494 (LV) | ± 4.4% | 2% | 6% | 19% | 5% | 2% | 2% | 2% | 4% | 47% | 0% (Note: Suarez with 0%) | 10% |
| New Hampshire Journal/co-efficient | Jun 14–16, 2023 | 904 (LV) | ± 3.3% | – | 9% | 13% | 3% | – | 5% | 3% | 3% | 47% | 5% | 10% |
| New Hampshire Journal/co-efficient | Jun 14–16, 2023 | 904 (LV) | ± 3.3% | – | – | 23% | – | – | – | – | – | 49% | – | 28% |
| National Research | Jun 12–14, 2023 | 500 (LV) | ± 4.4% | – | 7% | 12% | 5% | 2% | 3% | 3% | 7% | 44% | 18% (Note: Undecided, Other & Refused) | – |
| National Research | May 15–17, 2023 | 500 (LV) | ± 4.4% | – | – | 18% | 3% | 1% | 1% | 6% | 1% | 39% | 32% (Note: Chris Sununu with 17%; "Undecided, Other & Refused" with 15%) | – |
| University of New Hampshire | Apr 13–17, 2023 | 818 (LV) | ± 3.4% | – | 1% | 22% | 3% | 0% | 3% | 3% | 2% | 42% | 20% (Note: Chris Sununu with 12%; Liz Cheney with 4%; Mike Pompeo with 2%; Kristi Noem with 1%; John Bolton and Marco Rubio with 0%; "Other" with 1%) | 4% |
| J.L Partners | Apr 2–11, 2023 | 623 (LV) | ± 3.9% | – | 2% | 18% | 4% | – | 2% | 1% | 1% | 51% | 19% (Note: Chris Sununu with 10%; Liz Cheney with 4%; Mike Pompeo and Glenn Youngkin with 1%; "Someone else" with 1%) | 6% |
| J.L Partners | Apr 2–11, 2023 | 623 (LV) | ± 3.9% | – | – | 33% | – | – | – | – | – | 53% | – | 13% |
| Saint Anselm College | Mar 28–30, 2023 | 1,320 (RV) | ± 4.0% | – | 1% | 29% | 4% | – | 1% | 3% | 1% | 42% | 19% (Note: Chris Sununu with 14%; Liz Cheney with 2%; Mike Pompeo with 1%; Kristy Noem with 0%; Other with 2%.) | – |
| Emerson College | Mar 3–5, 2023 | 384 (RV) | ± 5.0% | – | – | 17% | 6% | – | 4% | – | 1% | 58% | 14% (Note: Chris Sununu with 7%; Mike Pompeo with 2%; Larry Hogan with 1%; Kristi Noem with 1%; "Someone else" with 3%) | – |
| co/efficient | Jan 25–26, 2023 | 506 (LV) | ± 4.35% | – | – | – | – | – | – | – | – | 43% | 42% | 15% |
| co/efficient | Jan 25–26, 2023 | 506 (LV) | ± 4.35% | – | – | 26% | 4% | – | 3% | – | – | 37% | 13% (Note: Chris Sununu with 13%; Glenn Youngkin with 0%) | 18% |
| University of New Hampshire | Jan 19–23, 2023 | 349 (LV) | ± 5.2% | – | – | 42% | 8% | – | 1% | – | 0% | 30% | 16% (Note: Liz Cheney, Chris Sununu and Larry Hogan with 4%; Kristi Noem with 2%; Ted Cruz and Marco Rubio with 1%; Mike Pompeo and Glenn Youngkin with 0%) | 3% |
| Neighborhood Research and Media | Dec 5–13, 2022 | 434 (LV) | ± 4.7% | – | – | 33% | – | – | 3% | – | – | 32% | 13% | 19% |
| WPA Intelligence (Note: Poll sponsored by Club for Growth) | Nov 11–13, 2022 | 401 (LV) | ± 4.9% | – | – | 52% | – | – | – | – | – | 37% | – | 11% |
| | November 8, 2022 | 2022 midterm elections | | | | | | | | | | | | |
| Saint Anselm College | Aug 9–11, 2022 | 820 (RV) | ± 3.4% | – | – | 29% | 3% | – | 3% | – | 1% | 50% | 4% (Note: Liz Cheney with 4%; Ted Cruz and Mike Pompeo with 1%; Larry Hogan with 0%) | 8% |
| WPA Intelligence | Aug 7–10, 2022 | 401 (LV) | ± 4.9% | – | – | 45% | – | – | – | – | – | 45% | – | 10% |
| Neighborhood Research and Media (Note: Poll sponsored by the Courageous Conservatives PAC) | Jul 5–8, 2022 | 475 (RV) | ± 4.5% | – | – | 22% | 1% | – | 1% | – | – | 41% | 3% (Note: Chris Sununu, Rand Paul and Mike Pompeo with 1%) | 32% |
| University of New Hampshire | Jun 16–20, 2022 | 318 (LV) | ± 5.5% | – | – | 39% | 6% | – | 9% | – | 0% | 37% | 6% (Note: Ted Cruz, Kristi Noem, and Mike Pompeo with 1%; Rick Scott with 0%; "Other" with 3%) | 3% |
| University of New Hampshire | Oct 14–18, 2021 | 441 (LV) | ± 4.7% | – | – | 18% | 6% | – | 4% | – | – | 43% | 14% (Note: Tom Cotton and Ted Cruz with 2%; Kristi Noem with 1%; Mike Pompeo with 0%; "Other" with 9%) | 10% |
| University of New Hampshire | Jul 15–19, 2021 | 770 (LV) | ± 3.5% | – | – | 19% | 6% | – | 5% | – | – | 43% | 13% (Note: Ted Cruz and Kristi Noem with 2%; Tom Cotton and Mike Pompeo with 0%; "Other" with 9%) | 10% |
| Saint Anselm College (Note: Poll sponsored by the John Bolton Super PAC) | May 7–10, 2021 | 635 (RV) | ± 3.9% | – | – | 20% | 7% | – | 4% | – | 0% | 52% | 7% (Note: Ted Cruz, Kristi Noem and Marco Rubio with 2%; Mitt Romney with 1%; Liz Cheney and John Kasich with 0%) | 10% |
| Victory Insights | Mar 5–11, 2021 | 400 (RV) | – | – | – | 5% | 3% | – | 6% | – | – | 52% | 14% (Note: Mitt Romney with 13%; Ted Cruz with 1%; Kristi Noem and Mike Pompeo with 0%) | – |
| Victory Insights | Mar 5–11, 2021 | 400 (RV) | – | – | – | 21% | 7% | – | 18% | – | – | – | 29% (Note: Mitt Romney with 15%; Ted Cruz with 10%; Mike Pompeo with 3%; Kristi Noem with 1%) | – |
| | January 20, 2021 | Inauguration of Joe Biden | | | | | | | | | | | | |
| Praecones Analytica | Nov 30 – December 2, 2020 | 624 (RV) | ± 4.0% | – | – | – | 7% | – | 6% | – | 2% | 57% | 19% (Note: Mitt Romney with 7%; Ted Cruz with 4%; Donald Trump Jr. with 3%; Tom Cotton and Marco Rubio with 2%; Tucker Carlson with 1%) | 10% |
| Praecones Analytica | Nov 30 – December 2, 2020 | 624 (RV) | ± 4.0% | – | – | – | 12% | – | 25% | – | 3% | – | 46% (Note: Donald Trump Jr. with 14%; Ted Cruz with 10%; Mitt Romney with 8%; Tom Cotton with 6%; Tucker Carlson and Marco Rubio with 4%) | 14% |

== Results ==
New Hampshire Republican primary, January 23, 2024
| Candidate | Votes | Percentage | Delegate count | | | | |
|---|---|---|---|---|---|---|---|
| Candidate | Votes | Percentage | Delegate count | Donald Trump | 176,391 | 54.35% | 13 |
| Nikki Haley | 140,491 | 43.28% | 9 | | | | |
| Ron DeSantis (withdrawn) | 2,241 | 0.69% | | | | | |
| Chris Christie (withdrawn) | 1,493 | 0.46% | | | | | |
| Vivek Ramaswamy (withdrawn) | 833 | 0.26% | | | | | |
| Joe Biden (write-in) (Democrat) | 497 | 0.15% | | | | | |
| Mike Pence (withdrawn) | 404 | 0.12% | | | | | |
| Ryan Binkley | 315 | 0.10% | | | | | |
| Mary Maxwell | 287 | 0.09% | | | | | |
| Robert F. Kennedy (write-in) (Independent) | 205 | 0.06% | | | | | |
| Tim Scott (withdrawn) | 196 | 0.06% | | | | | |
| Doug Burgum (withdrawn) | 180 | 0.06% | | | | | |
| Asa Hutchinson (withdrawn) | 108 | 0.03% | | | | | |
| Rachel Swift | 105 | 0.03% | | | | | |
| Scott Ayers | 80 | 0.02% | | | | | |
| Dean Phillips (write-in) (Democrat) | 79 | 0.02% | | | | | |
| Darius Mitchell | 74 | 0.02% | | | | | |
| Glenn McPeters | 49 | 0.02% | | | | | |
| "Ceasefire" (write-in) | 34 | 0.01% | | | | | |
| Perry Johnson (withdrawn) | 26 | 0.01% | | | | | |
| Peter Jedick | 25 | 0.01% | | | | | |
| David Stuckenberg | 25 | 0.01% | | | | | |
| Donald Kjornes | 23 | 0.01% | | | | | |
| Scott Merrell | 21 | 0.01% | | | | | |
| John Anthony Castro | 19 | 0.01% | | | | | |
| Robert Carney | 15 | <0.01% | | | | | |
| Marianne Williamson (write-in) (Democrat) | 14 | <0.01% | | | | | |
| Hirsh Singh (withdrawn) | 9 | <0.01% | | | | | |
| Sam Sloan | 7 | <0.01% | | | | | |
| Vermin Supreme (write-in) (Democrat) | 3 | <0.01% | | | | | |
| Mark Steward Greenstein (write-in) (Democrat) | 1 | <0.01% | | | | | |
| Other write-in votes | 325 | 0.10% | | | | | |
| Total: | 324,575 | 100.00% | 22 | | | | |

By county and municipality

| County/ Municipality | Donald Trump | | Nikki Haley | | Others | | Margin | | Total votes |
| County/ Municipality | % | # | % | # | % | # | % | # | Total votes |
|---|---|---|---|---|---|---|---|---|---|
| Belknap County | 56.63% | 10,508 | 41.17% | 7,639 | 2.21% | 410 | 15.46% | 2,869 | 18,557 |
| Alton | 60.75% | 1,238 | 37.93% | 773 | 1.32% | 27 | 22.82% | 465 | 2,038 |
| Barnstead | 65.21% | 881 | 33.09% | 447 | 1.70% | 23 | 32.12% | 434 | 1,351 |
| Belmont | 64.96% | 1,244 | 33.42% | 640 | 1.62% | 31 | 31.54% | 604 | 1,915 |
| Center Harbor | 51.52% | 204 | 46.97% | 186 | 1.52% | 6 | 4.55% | 18 | 396 |
| Gilford | 49.63% | 1,284 | 47.12% | 1,219 | 3.25% | 84 | 2.51% | 65 | 2,587 |
| Gilmanton | 61.74% | 789 | 36.15% | 462 | 2.11% | 27 | 25.59% | 327 | 1,278 |
| Laconia | 56.21% | 2,307 | 41.47% | 1,702 | 2.31% | 95 | 14.74% | 605 | 4,104 |
| Meredith | 43.66% | 981 | 53.23% | 1,196 | 3.12% | 70 | -9.57% | -215 | 2,247 |
| New Hampton | 58.53% | 429 | 40.11% | 294 | 1.36% | 10 | 18.42% | 135 | 733 |
| Sanbornton | 61.27% | 617 | 37.34% | 376 | 1.39% | 14 | 23.93% | 241 | 1,007 |
| Tilton | 59.27% | 534 | 38.18% | 344 | 2.55% | 23 | 21.09% | 190 | 901 |
| Carroll County | 52.68% | 7,870 | 45.16% | 6,747 | 2.16% | 323 | 7.52% | 1,123 | 14,940 |
| Albany | 57.06% | 101 | 40.68% | 72 | 2.26% | 4 | 16.38% | 29 | 177 |
| Bartlett | 35.19% | 304 | 62.73% | 542 | 2.08% | 18 | -27.55% | -238 | 864 |
| Brookfield | 58.56% | 171 | 39.73% | 116 | 1.71% | 5 | 18.84% | 55 | 292 |
| Chatham | 59.79% | 58 | 40.21% | 39 | 0.00% | 0 | 19.59% | 19 | 97 |
| Conway | 48.67% | 988 | 49.75% | 1,010 | 1.58% | 32 | -1.08% | -22 | 2,030 |
| Eaton | 44.74% | 51 | 53.51% | 61 | 1.75% | 2 | -8.77% | -10 | 114 |
| Effingham | 67.67% | 316 | 30.41% | 142 | 1.93% | 9 | 37.26% | 174 | 467 |
| Freedom | 53.88% | 285 | 42.34% | 224 | 3.78% | 20 | 11.53% | 61 | 529 |
| Hale's Location | 45.00% | 36 | 52.50% | 42 | 2.50% | 2 | -7.50% | -6 | 80 |
| Hart's Location | 73.68% | 14 | 26.32% | 5 | 0.00% | 0 | 47.37% | 9 | 19 |
| Jackson | 26.02% | 89 | 72.22% | 247 | 1.75% | 6 | -46.20% | -158 | 342 |
| Madison | 49.05% | 361 | 49.32% | 363 | 1.63% | 12 | -0.27% | -2 | 736 |
| Moultonborough | 48.79% | 946 | 48.53% | 941 | 2.68% | 52 | 0.26% | 5 | 1,939 |
| Ossipee | 66.28% | 790 | 32.13% | 383 | 1.59% | 19 | 34.14% | 407 | 1,192 |
| Sandwich | 48.74% | 213 | 49.43% | 216 | 1.83% | 8 | -0.69% | -3 | 437 |
| Tamworth | 56.16% | 401 | 40.76% | 291 | 3.08% | 22 | 15.41% | 110 | 714 |
| Tuftonboro | 51.11% | 508 | 46.58% | 463 | 2.31% | 23 | 4.53% | 45 | 994 |
| Wakefield | 64.83% | 1,056 | 32.90% | 536 | 2.27% | 37 | 31.92% | 520 | 1,629 |
| Wolfeboro | 51.66% | 1,182 | 46.07% | 1,054 | 2.27% | 52 | 5.59% | 128 | 2,288 |
| Cheshire County | 54.79% | 8,531 | 43.06% | 6,704 | 2.15% | 335 | 11.73% | 1,827 | 15,570 |
| Alstead | 55.58% | 259 | 42.27% | 197 | 2.15% | 10 | 13.30% | 62 | 466 |
| Chesterfield | 48.78% | 420 | 49.59% | 427 | 1.63% | 14 | -0.81% | -7 | 861 |
| Dublin | 40.95% | 190 | 54.74% | 254 | 4.31% | 20 | -13.79% | -64 | 464 |
| Fitzwilliam | 64.77% | 388 | 32.05% | 192 | 3.17% | 19 | 32.72% | 196 | 599 |
| Gilsum | 56.41% | 110 | 41.03% | 80 | 2.56% | 5 | 15.38% | 30 | 195 |
| Harrisville | 37.40% | 92 | 59.35% | 146 | 3.25% | 8 | -21.95% | -54 | 246 |
| Hinsdale | 61.44% | 333 | 36.90% | 200 | 1.66% | 9 | 24.54% | 133 | 542 |
| Jaffrey | 58.83% | 723 | 38.73% | 476 | 2.44% | 30 | 20.10% | 247 | 1,229 |
| Keene | 44.10% | 1,468 | 54.10% | 1,801 | 1.80% | 60 | -10.00% | -333 | 3,329 |
| Marlborough | 52.38% | 220 | 44.76% | 188 | 2.86% | 12 | 7.62% | 32 | 420 |
| Marlow | 57.89% | 121 | 40.19% | 84 | 1.91% | 4 | 17.70% | 37 | 209 |
| Nelson | 56.05% | 88 | 43.95% | 69 | 0.00% | 0 | 12.10% | 19 | 157 |
| Richmond | 72.73% | 256 | 25.28% | 89 | 1.99% | 7 | 47.44% | 167 | 352 |
| Rindge | 69.74% | 1,180 | 27.90% | 472 | 2.36% | 40 | 41.84% | 708 | 1,692 |
| Roxbury | 40.82% | 20 | 59.18% | 29 | 0.00% | 0 | -18.37% | -9 | 49 |
| Stoddard | 61.69% | 256 | 37.35% | 155 | 0.96% | 4 | 24.34% | 101 | 415 |
| Sullivan | 62.30% | 119 | 35.08% | 67 | 2.62% | 5 | 27.23% | 52 | 191 |
| Surry | 42.86% | 93 | 56.22% | 122 | 0.92% | 2 | -13.36% | -29 | 217 |
| Swanzey | 55.84% | 851 | 42.45% | 647 | 1.71% | 26 | 13.39% | 204 | 1,524 |
| Troy | 66.10% | 310 | 31.13% | 146 | 2.77% | 13 | 34.97% | 164 | 469 |
| Walpole | 41.22% | 352 | 55.85% | 477 | 2.93% | 25 | -14.64% | -125 | 854 |
| Westmoreland | 46.41% | 194 | 51.44% | 215 | 2.15% | 9 | -5.02% | -21 | 418 |
| Winchester | 72.62% | 488 | 25.45% | 171 | 1.93% | 13 | 47.17% | 317 | 672 |
| Coös County | 61.02% | 4,295 | 36.64% | 2,579 | 2.34% | 165 | 24.38% | 1,716 | 7,039 |
| Berlin | 63.54% | 875 | 34.35% | 473 | 2.11% | 29 | 29.19% | 402 | 1,377 |
| Cambridge | 66.67% | 2 | 0.00% | 0 | 33.33% | 1 | 66.67% | 2 | 3 |
| Carroll | 58.59% | 133 | 38.33% | 87 | 3.08% | 7 | 20.26% | 46 | 227 |
| Clarksville | 64.29% | 54 | 35.71% | 30 | 0.00% | 0 | 28.57% | 24 | 84 |
| Colebrook | 60.88% | 344 | 37.88% | 214 | 1.24% | 7 | 23.01% | 130 | 565 |
| Columbia | 61.93% | 122 | 37.06% | 73 | 1.02% | 2 | 24.87% | 49 | 197 |
| Dalton | 61.31% | 168 | 33.58% | 92 | 5.11% | 14 | 27.74% | 76 | 274 |
| Dixville | 0.00% | 0 | 100.0% | 6 | 0.00% | 0 | -100.0% | -6 | 6 |
| Dummer | 65.82% | 52 | 29.11% | 23 | 5.06% | 4 | 36.71% | 29 | 79 |
| Errol | 54.62% | 65 | 43.70% | 52 | 1.68% | 2 | 10.92% | 13 | 119 |
| Gorham | 56.08% | 355 | 41.55% | 263 | 2.37% | 15 | 14.53% | 92 | 633 |
| Jefferson | 58.60% | 218 | 37.10% | 138 | 4.30% | 16 | 21.51% | 80 | 372 |
| Lancaster | 55.66% | 398 | 42.38% | 303 | 1.96% | 14 | 13.29% | 95 | 715 |
| Milan | 63.53% | 216 | 35.00% | 119 | 1.47% | 5 | 28.53% | 97 | 340 |
| Millsfield | 78.57% | 11 | 14.29% | 2 | 7.14% | 1 | 64.29% | 9 | 14 |
| Northumberland | 65.02% | 290 | 32.51% | 145 | 2.47% | 11 | 32.51% | 145 | 446 |
| Pittsburg | 65.61% | 206 | 32.80% | 103 | 1.59% | 5 | 32.80% | 103 | 314 |
| Randolph | 40.91% | 36 | 56.82% | 50 | 2.27% | 2 | -15.91% | -14 | 88 |
| Shelburne | 62.14% | 87 | 34.29% | 48 | 3.57% | 5 | 27.86% | 39 | 140 |
| Stark | 72.19% | 122 | 26.04% | 44 | 1.78% | 3 | 46.15% | 78 | 169 |
| Stewartstown | 67.76% | 124 | 30.60% | 56 | 1.64% | 3 | 37.16% | 68 | 183 |
| Stratford | 69.47% | 91 | 28.24% | 37 | 2.29% | 3 | 41.22% | 54 | 131 |
| Wentworth; Location | 75.00% | 12 | 25.00% | 4 | 0.00% | 0 | 50.00% | 8 | 16 |
| Whitefield | 57.40% | 314 | 39.67% | 217 | 2.93% | 16 | 17.73% | 97 | 547 |
| Grafton County | 46.82% | 8,949 | 50.92% | 9,732 | 2.26% | 432 | -4.10% | -783 | 19,113 |
| Alexandria | 58.55% | 332 | 38.10% | 216 | 3.35% | 19 | 20.46% | 116 | 567 |
| Ashland | 56.47% | 275 | 40.86% | 199 | 2.67% | 13 | 15.61% | 76 | 487 |
| Bath | 62.80% | 184 | 36.52% | 107 | 0.68% | 2 | 26.28% | 77 | 293 |
| Benton | 68.57% | 72 | 30.48% | 32 | 0.95% | 1 | 38.10% | 40 | 105 |
| Bethlehem | 49.82% | 282 | 48.23% | 273 | 1.94% | 11 | 1.59% | 9 | 566 |
| Bridgewater | 54.63% | 236 | 43.98% | 190 | 1.39% | 6 | 10.65% | 46 | 432 |
| Bristol | 56.25% | 495 | 42.05% | 370 | 1.70% | 15 | 14.20% | 125 | 880 |
| Campton | 53.76% | 465 | 44.62% | 386 | 1.62% | 14 | 9.13% | 79 | 865 |
| Canaan | 48.69% | 354 | 50.07% | 364 | 1.24% | 9 | -1.38% | -10 | 727 |
| Dorchester | 68.18% | 75 | 30.91% | 34 | 0.91% | 1 | 37.27% | 41 | 110 |
| Easton | 48.10% | 38 | 50.63% | 40 | 1.27% | 1 | -2.53% | -2 | 79 |
| Ellsworth | 37.50% | 12 | 59.38% | 19 | 3.13% | 1 | -21.88% | -7 | 32 |
| Enfield | 46.58% | 402 | 51.33% | 443 | 2.09% | 18 | -4.75% | -41 | 863 |
| Franconia | 33.03% | 110 | 65.77% | 219 | 1.20% | 4 | -32.73% | -109 | 333 |
| Grafton | 63.20% | 225 | 35.11% | 125 | 1.69% | 6 | 28.09% | 100 | 356 |
| Groton | 67.35% | 132 | 30.61% | 60 | 2.04% | 4 | 36.73% | 72 | 196 |
| Hanover | 13.04% | 228 | 85.07% | 1,487 | 1.89% | 33 | -72.03% | -1,259 | 1,748 |
| Haverhill | 61.80% | 550 | 36.07% | 321 | 2.13% | 19 | 25.73% | 229 | 890 |
| Hebron | 41.35% | 129 | 56.09% | 175 | 2.56% | 8 | -14.74% | -46 | 312 |
| Holderness | 43.91% | 256 | 53.86% | 314 | 2.23% | 13 | -9.95% | -58 | 583 |
| Landaff | 52.99% | 62 | 45.30% | 53 | 1.71% | 2 | 7.69% | 9 | 117 |
| Lebanon | 35.80% | 658 | 61.10% | 1,123 | 3.10% | 57 | -25.30% | -465 | 1,838 |
| Lincoln | 36.52% | 145 | 59.45% | 236 | 4.03% | 16 | -22.92% | -91 | 397 |
| Lisbon | 60.66% | 202 | 37.84% | 126 | 1.50% | 5 | 22.82% | 76 | 333 |
| Littleton | 57.21% | 734 | 39.98% | 513 | 2.81% | 36 | 17.23% | 221 | 1,283 |
| Lyman | 61.05% | 116 | 35.79% | 68 | 3.16% | 6 | 25.26% | 48 | 190 |
| Lyme | 15.45% | 51 | 81.82% | 270 | 2.73% | 9 | -66.36% | -219 | 330 |
| Monroe | 62.76% | 150 | 35.98% | 86 | 1.26% | 3 | 26.78% | 64 | 239 |
| Orange | 55.84% | 43 | 41.56% | 32 | 2.60% | 2 | 14.29% | 11 | 77 |
| Orford | 41.98% | 110 | 56.11% | 147 | 1.91% | 5 | -14.12% | -37 | 262 |
| Piermont | 53.85% | 98 | 43.96% | 80 | 2.20% | 4 | 9.89% | 18 | 182 |
| Plymouth | 48.43% | 431 | 49.21% | 438 | 2.36% | 21 | -0.79% | -7 | 890 |
| Rumney | 61.40% | 307 | 36.20% | 181 | 2.40% | 12 | 25.20% | 126 | 500 |
| Sugar Hill | 37.04% | 70 | 60.32% | 114 | 2.65% | 5 | -23.28% | -44 | 189 |
| Thornton | 46.81% | 352 | 51.06% | 384 | 2.13% | 16 | -4.26% | -32 | 752 |
| Warren | 66.14% | 168 | 32.28% | 82 | 1.57% | 4 | 33.86% | 86 | 254 |
| Waterville Valley | 27.78% | 55 | 65.66% | 130 | 6.57% | 13 | -37.88% | -75 | 198 |
| Wentworth | 65.42% | 193 | 31.86% | 94 | 2.71% | 8 | 33.56% | 99 | 295 |
| Woodstock | 41.87% | 152 | 55.37% | 201 | 2.75% | 10 | -13.50% | -49 | 363 |
| Hillsborough County | 54.24% | 49,462 | 43.79% | 39,935 | 1.97% | 1,799 | 10.45% | 9,527 | 91,196 |
| Amherst | 42.61% | 1,516 | 55.87% | 1,988 | 1.52% | 54 | -13.27% | -472 | 3,558 |
| Antrim | 57.62% | 382 | 40.12% | 266 | 2.26% | 15 | 17.50% | 116 | 663 |
| Bedford | 44.55% | 2,981 | 53.65% | 3,590 | 1.81% | 121 | -9.10% | -609 | 6,692 |
| Bennington | 64.07% | 230 | 33.70% | 121 | 2.23% | 8 | 30.36% | 109 | 359 |
| Brookline | 47.16% | 764 | 51.48% | 834 | 1.36% | 22 | -4.32% | -70 | 1,620 |
| Deering | 64.46% | 399 | 34.57% | 214 | 0.97% | 6 | 29.89% | 185 | 619 |
| Francestown | 55.41% | 302 | 40.55% | 221 | 4.04% | 22 | 14.86% | 81 | 545 |
| Goffstown | 52.99% | 2,329 | 44.60% | 1,960 | 2.41% | 106 | 8.40% | 369 | 4,395 |
| Greenfield | 57.23% | 277 | 40.29% | 195 | 2.48% | 12 | 16.94% | 82 | 484 |
| Greenville | 67.67% | 270 | 30.33% | 121 | 2.01% | 8 | 37.34% | 149 | 399 |
| Hancock | 42.05% | 201 | 55.44% | 265 | 2.51% | 12 | -13.39% | -64 | 478 |
| Hillsborough | 63.28% | 865 | 34.53% | 472 | 2.19% | 30 | 28.75% | 393 | 1,367 |
| Hollis | 41.47% | 1,143 | 56.53% | 1,558 | 2.00% | 55 | -15.06% | -415 | 2,756 |
| Hudson | 62.64% | 3,619 | 35.94% | 2,076 | 1.42% | 82 | 26.71% | 1,543 | 5,777 |
| Litchfield | 53.22% | 1,297 | 44.81% | 1,092 | 1.97% | 48 | 8.41% | 205 | 2,437 |
| Lyndeborough | 57.33% | 301 | 41.14% | 216 | 1.52% | 8 | 16.19% | 85 | 525 |
| Manchester | 56.77% | 10,027 | 40.89% | 7,223 | 2.34% | 414 | 15.87% | 2,804 | 17,664 |
| Mason | 59.58% | 286 | 38.13% | 183 | 2.29% | 11 | 21.46% | 103 | 480 |
| Merrimack | 50.52% | 3,529 | 47.63% | 3,327 | 1.85% | 129 | 2.89% | 202 | 6,985 |
| Milford | 52.85% | 2,005 | 45.07% | 1,710 | 2.08% | 79 | 7.78% | 295 | 3,794 |
| Mont Vernon | 46.39% | 385 | 51.45% | 427 | 2.17% | 18 | -5.06% | -42 | 830 |
| Nashua | 52.08% | 7,861 | 45.93% | 6,932 | 1.99% | 300 | 6.16% | 929 | 15,093 |
| New Boston | 55.08% | 1,020 | 44.06% | 816 | 0.86% | 16 | 11.02% | 204 | 1,852 |
| New Ipswich | 74.24% | 1,193 | 23.46% | 377 | 2.30% | 37 | 50.78% | 816 | 1,607 |
| Pelham | 68.45% | 3,037 | 29.95% | 1,329 | 1.60% | 71 | 38.49% | 1,708 | 4,437 |
| Peterborough | 41.29% | 545 | 56.59% | 747 | 2.12% | 28 | -15.30% | -202 | 1,320 |
| Sharon | 49.58% | 59 | 49.58% | 59 | 0.84% | 1 | 0.00% | 0 | 119 |
| Temple | 57.74% | 235 | 40.79% | 166 | 1.47% | 6 | 16.95% | 69 | 407 |
| Weare | 62.39% | 1,790 | 35.80% | 1,027 | 1.81% | 52 | 26.59% | 763 | 2,869 |
| Wilton | 56.17% | 551 | 40.98% | 402 | 2.85% | 28 | 15.19% | 149 | 981 |
| Windsor | 75.00% | 63 | 25.00% | 21 | 0.00% | 0 | 50.00% | 42 | 84 |
| Merrimack County | 52.41% | 19,558 | 45.39% | 16,940 | 2.20% | 820 | 7.02% | 2,618 | 37,318 |
| Allenstown | 63.36% | 638 | 34.76% | 350 | 1.89% | 19 | 28.60% | 288 | 1,007 |
| Andover | 60.98% | 375 | 37.24% | 229 | 1.79% | 11 | 23.74% | 146 | 615 |
| Boscawen | 61.12% | 525 | 36.90% | 317 | 1.98% | 17 | 24.21% | 208 | 859 |
| Bow | 41.52% | 1,018 | 56.44% | 1,384 | 2.04% | 50 | -14.93% | -366 | 2,452 |
| Bradford | 50.42% | 238 | 45.97% | 217 | 3.60% | 17 | 4.45% | 21 | 472 |
| Canterbury | 47.44% | 370 | 50.26% | 392 | 2.31% | 18 | -2.82% | -22 | 780 |
| Chichester | 62.01% | 555 | 36.54% | 327 | 1.45% | 13 | 25.47% | 228 | 895 |
| Concord | 45.48% | 3,588 | 52.17% | 4,116 | 2.36% | 186 | -6.69% | -528 | 7,890 |
| Danbury | 62.91% | 251 | 34.84% | 139 | 2.26% | 9 | 28.07% | 112 | 399 |
| Dunbarton | 54.14% | 575 | 43.79% | 465 | 2.07% | 22 | 10.36% | 110 | 1,062 |
| Epsom | 61.37% | 872 | 37.02% | 526 | 1.62% | 23 | 24.35% | 346 | 1,421 |
| Franklin | 65.21% | 1,168 | 33.05% | 592 | 1.73% | 31 | 32.16% | 576 | 1,791 |
| Henniker | 50.09% | 549 | 48.91% | 536 | 1.00% | 11 | 1.19% | 13 | 1,096 |
| Hill | 65.56% | 236 | 32.22% | 116 | 2.22% | 8 | 33.33% | 120 | 360 |
| Hooksett | 54.05% | 1,997 | 43.84% | 1,620 | 2.11% | 78 | 10.20% | 377 | 3,695 |
| Hopkinton | 41.33% | 629 | 56.31% | 857 | 2.37% | 36 | -14.98% | -228 | 1,522 |
| Loudon | 61.53% | 1,222 | 36.86% | 732 | 1.61% | 32 | 24.67% | 490 | 1,986 |
| Newbury | 44.80% | 375 | 51.97% | 435 | 3.23% | 27 | -7.17% | -60 | 837 |
| New London | 32.42% | 404 | 63.64% | 793 | 3.93% | 49 | -31.22% | -389 | 1,246 |
| Northfield | 62.72% | 752 | 35.28% | 423 | 2.00% | 24 | 27.44% | 329 | 1,199 |
| Pembroke | 55.86% | 992 | 41.55% | 738 | 2.59% | 46 | 14.30% | 254 | 1,776 |
| Pittsfield | 68.30% | 711 | 29.59% | 308 | 2.11% | 22 | 38.71% | 403 | 1,041 |
| Salisbury | 61.52% | 291 | 35.94% | 170 | 2.54% | 12 | 25.58% | 121 | 473 |
| Sutton | 47.78% | 291 | 49.92% | 304 | 2.30% | 14 | -2.13% | -13 | 609 |
| Warner | 50.37% | 405 | 46.02% | 370 | 3.61% | 29 | 4.35% | 35 | 804 |
| Webster | 54.75% | 334 | 43.61% | 266 | 1.64% | 10 | 11.15% | 68 | 610 |
| Wilmot | 46.79% | 197 | 51.78% | 218 | 1.43% | 6 | -4.99% | -21 | 421 |
| Rockingham County | 56.70% | 47,937 | 41.47% | 35,061 | 1.82% | 1,541 | 15.23% | 12,876 | 84,539 |
| Atkinson | 60.18% | 1,576 | 37.84% | 991 | 1.99% | 52 | 22.34% | 585 | 2,619 |
| Auburn | 58.16% | 1,173 | 40.16% | 810 | 1.69% | 34 | 18.00% | 363 | 2,017 |
| Brentwood | 50.04% | 713 | 47.44% | 676 | 2.53% | 36 | 2.60% | 37 | 1,425 |
| Candia | 62.75% | 945 | 34.66% | 522 | 2.59% | 39 | 28.09% | 423 | 1,506 |
| Chester | 58.17% | 1,015 | 40.23% | 702 | 1.60% | 28 | 17.94% | 313 | 1,745 |
| Danville | 69.03% | 992 | 29.78% | 428 | 1.18% | 17 | 39.25% | 564 | 1,437 |
| Deerfield | 59.28% | 942 | 39.21% | 623 | 1.51% | 24 | 20.08% | 319 | 1,589 |
| Derry | 63.93% | 4,485 | 34.41% | 2,414 | 1.65% | 116 | 29.52% | 2,071 | 7,015 |
| East Kingston | 50.31% | 400 | 47.92% | 381 | 1.76% | 14 | 2.39% | 19 | 795 |
| Epping | 61.58% | 1,242 | 36.74% | 741 | 1.69% | 34 | 24.84% | 501 | 2,017 |
| Exeter | 41.74% | 1,457 | 56.43% | 1,970 | 1.83% | 64 | -14.69% | -513 | 3,491 |
| Fremont | 60.91% | 952 | 36.98% | 578 | 2.11% | 33 | 23.93% | 374 | 1,563 |
| Greenland | 43.13% | 559 | 55.17% | 715 | 1.70% | 22 | -12.04% | -156 | 1,296 |
| Hampstead | 61.71% | 1,763 | 36.93% | 1,055 | 1.37% | 39 | 24.78% | 708 | 2,857 |
| Hampton | 51.33% | 2,299 | 46.71% | 2,092 | 1.96% | 88 | 4.62% | 207 | 4,479 |
| Hampton Falls | 53.04% | 445 | 44.82% | 376 | 2.15% | 18 | 8.22% | 69 | 839 |
| Kensington | 52.80% | 340 | 44.88% | 289 | 2.33% | 15 | 7.92% | 51 | 644 |
| Kingston | 64.82% | 1,242 | 33.56% | 643 | 1.62% | 31 | 31.26% | 599 | 1,916 |
| Londonderry | 56.77% | 3,868 | 41.25% | 2,811 | 1.98% | 135 | 15.51% | 1,057 | 6,814 |
| New Castle | 25.88% | 96 | 70.08% | 260 | 4.04% | 15 | -44.20% | -164 | 371 |
| Newfields | 40.78% | 241 | 57.02% | 337 | 2.20% | 13 | -16.24% | -96 | 591 |
| Newington | 50.81% | 157 | 46.60% | 144 | 2.59% | 8 | 4.21% | 13 | 309 |
| Newmarket | 43.42% | 788 | 53.88% | 978 | 2.70% | 49 | -10.47% | -190 | 1,815 |
| Newton | 66.56% | 870 | 31.83% | 416 | 1.61% | 21 | 34.74% | 454 | 1,307 |
| North Hampton | 45.72% | 641 | 52.00% | 729 | 2.28% | 32 | -6.28% | -88 | 1,402 |
| Northwood | 58.96% | 724 | 39.58% | 486 | 1.47% | 18 | 19.38% | 238 | 1,228 |
| Nottingham | 53.44% | 869 | 44.53% | 724 | 2.03% | 33 | 8.92% | 145 | 1,626 |
| Plaistow | 68.72% | 1,362 | 29.82% | 591 | 1.46% | 29 | 38.90% | 771 | 1,982 |
| Portsmouth | 37.08% | 1,445 | 60.64% | 2,363 | 2.28% | 89 | -23.56% | -918 | 3,897 |
| Raymond | 67.88% | 1,984 | 30.65% | 896 | 1.47% | 43 | 37.22% | 1,088 | 2,923 |
| Rye | 38.11% | 702 | 58.96% | 1,086 | 2.93% | 54 | -20.85% | -384 | 1,842 |
| Salem | 66.91% | 5,227 | 31.48% | 2,459 | 1.61% | 126 | 35.43% | 2,768 | 7,812 |
| Sandown | 67.37% | 1,379 | 31.61% | 647 | 1.03% | 21 | 35.76% | 732 | 2,047 |
| Seabrook | 71.14% | 1,499 | 27.20% | 573 | 1.66% | 35 | 43.95% | 926 | 2,107 |
| South Hampton | 58.13% | 143 | 40.24% | 99 | 1.63% | 4 | 17.89% | 44 | 246 |
| Stratham | 37.53% | 826 | 61.11% | 1,345 | 1.36% | 30 | -23.58% | -519 | 2,201 |
| Windham | 54.02% | 2,576 | 44.27% | 2,111 | 1.72% | 82 | 9.75% | 465 | 4,769 |
| Strafford County | 54.29% | 13,730 | 43.74% | 11,062 | 1.97% | 497 | 10.55% | 2,668 | 25,289 |
| Barrington | 53.68% | 1,277 | 44.26% | 1,053 | 2.06% | 49 | 9.42% | 224 | 2,379 |
| Dover | 44.46% | 2,438 | 53.20% | 2,917 | 2.33% | 128 | -8.74% | -479 | 5,483 |
| Durham | 29.51% | 476 | 68.32% | 1,102 | 2.17% | 35 | -38.81% | -626 | 1,613 |
| Farmington | 71.47% | 1,052 | 27.45% | 404 | 1.09% | 16 | 44.02% | 648 | 1,472 |
| Lee | 43.08% | 439 | 54.76% | 558 | 2.16% | 22 | -11.68% | -119 | 1,019 |
| Madbury | 39.45% | 187 | 59.07% | 280 | 1.48% | 7 | -19.62% | -93 | 474 |
| Middleton | 69.45% | 366 | 28.84% | 152 | 1.71% | 9 | 40.61% | 214 | 527 |
| Milton | 69.83% | 773 | 29.09% | 322 | 1.08% | 12 | 40.74% | 451 | 1,107 |
| New Durham | 59.96% | 563 | 37.91% | 356 | 2.13% | 20 | 22.04% | 207 | 939 |
| Rochester | 62.21% | 4,026 | 35.78% | 2,316 | 2.01% | 130 | 26.42% | 1,710 | 6,472 |
| Rollinsford | 53.89% | 319 | 45.10% | 267 | 1.01% | 6 | 8.78% | 52 | 592 |
| Somersworth | 59.10% | 1,104 | 38.87% | 726 | 2.03% | 38 | 20.24% | 378 | 1,868 |
| Strafford | 52.83% | 710 | 45.31% | 609 | 1.86% | 25 | 7.51% | 101 | 1,344 |
| Sullivan County | 56.33% | 5,551 | 41.52% | 4,092 | 2.15% | 212 | 14.80% | 1,459 | 9,855 |
| Acworth | 53.25% | 123 | 45.89% | 106 | 0.87% | 2 | 7.36% | 17 | 231 |
| Charlestown | 63.10% | 578 | 34.83% | 319 | 2.07% | 19 | 28.28% | 259 | 916 |
| Claremont | 66.03% | 1,324 | 32.22% | 646 | 1.75% | 35 | 33.82% | 678 | 2,005 |
| Cornish | 50.57% | 220 | 46.90% | 204 | 2.53% | 11 | 3.68% | 16 | 435 |
| Croydon | 67.10% | 208 | 31.61% | 98 | 1.29% | 4 | 35.48% | 110 | 310 |
| Goshen | 61.69% | 153 | 37.10% | 92 | 1.21% | 3 | 24.60% | 61 | 248 |
| Grantham | 37.89% | 330 | 59.59% | 519 | 2.53% | 22 | -21.70% | -189 | 871 |
| Langdon | 56.52% | 104 | 41.85% | 77 | 1.63% | 3 | 14.67% | 27 | 184 |
| Lempster | 66.57% | 235 | 32.58% | 115 | 0.85% | 3 | 33.99% | 120 | 353 |
| Newport | 62.30% | 836 | 35.84% | 481 | 1.86% | 25 | 26.45% | 355 | 1,342 |
| Plainfield | 33.86% | 194 | 61.61% | 353 | 4.54% | 26 | -27.75% | -159 | 573 |
| Springfield | 49.76% | 209 | 48.33% | 203 | 1.90% | 8 | 1.43% | 6 | 420 |
| Sunapee | 44.97% | 528 | 51.96% | 610 | 3.07% | 36 | -6.98% | -82 | 1,174 |
| Unity | 69.75% | 279 | 28.25% | 113 | 2.00% | 8 | 41.50% | 166 | 400 |
| Washington | 58.52% | 230 | 39.69% | 156 | 1.78% | 7 | 18.83% | 74 | 393 |

== See also ==
- 2024 New Hampshire Democratic presidential primary
- 2024 Republican Party presidential primaries
- 2024 United States presidential election
- 2024 United States presidential election in New Hampshire
- 2024 United States elections

== Notes ==
Partisan clients
