= Richard Beaudoin =

Richard Beaudoin may refer to:

- Richard Beaudoin (composer)
- Richard Beaudoin (politician)
