= Norm Silber =

American politician

Member of the New Hampshire House of Representatives
- In office December 2, 2020 – December 7, 2022
- Preceded by: Deanna Jurius
- Succeeded by: Lisa Smart
- Constituency: Belknap 2

Personal details
- Party: Republican

Norman (Norm) Silber is an American former politician from New Hampshire. He served in the New Hampshire House of Representatives.
