= Matthew Lunney =

American politician

Member of the New Hampshire House of Representatives from the Belknap 2nd district
- In office December 4, 2024 – September 23, 2025 Serving with Matt Coker
- Preceded by: Lisa Smart
- Succeeded by: Seth Wheeler (elect)

Personal details
- Born: Matthew Joseph Lunney
- Party: Republican
- Occupation: Novelist; poet; politician
- Website: Campaign website

Matthew Joseph Lunney is an American politician, poet, and novelist. A Republican, he is a former member of the New Hampshire House of Representatives from the Belknap 2nd district from 2024, until his resignation in 2025; his letter of resignation was read aloud on September 22, 2025, in the New Hampshire State House, and his resignation took effect on September 23, 2025.

== Biography ==
According to his campaign website, Lunney grew up in Moultonborough and Meredith. His grandfather built a cabin on Bear Island in 1921. He has described himself as the owner of a small staffing agency. At the time of announcing his candidacy for office, he was the managing partner of Capital Placement Agency.

On September 30, 2020, Lunney's book Love in the Time of Madness was published by AuthorHouse. According to the publisher of the book, he has written more than one novel, short stories, and poetry.

In August 2024, the office of John Formella, the attorney general of New Hampshire, notified Lunney that they had received a complaint alleging that he had made a false statement in his "declaration of candidacy for the office of state representative from Belknap County District 2", warning Lunney against making any further false statements in official matters.

In September 2024, Lunney won the second most votes in the Republican primary election for the Belknap 2nd district of the New Hampshire House of Representatives after Matt Coker. He won the general election for the district along with Coker on November 5, 2024. He was a member of Belknap County Delegation's Budget Review Committee and sporadically voted in Concord. His letter of resignation addressed to Sherman Packard, the speaker of the New Hampshire House of Representatives, was read aloud on September 22, 2025, in the New Hampshire State House and his resignation took effect on September 23, 2025.

== Personal life ==
Lunney is divorced and lives in Meredith.

== Selected work ==
- Love in the Time of Madness. Bloomington, Indiana: AuthorHouse. September 30, 2020. ISBN 9781728373898.

== Electoral history ==
New Hampshire House of Representatives general election for the Belknap 2nd district, 2024 Source:
Party	Candidate	Votes	%
Republican	Matt Coker	2,648	32.09
Republican	Matthew Lunney	2,112	25.59
Democratic	Lynn Thomas	1,913	23.18
Democratic	Ben Brookmyer	1,579	19.14
Total votes		8,252	100

New Hampshire House of Representatives Republican primary election for the Belknap 2nd district, 2024 Source:
Party	Candidate	Votes	%
Republican	Matt Coker	749	53.4
Republican	Matthew Lunney	345	24.6
Republican	Edward Twaddell III	309	22
Total votes		1,403	100
