= Stephen Stepanek =

Chair of the New Hampshire Republican Party

Steve Stepanek

Chair of the New Hampshire Republican Party
- In office January 26, 2019 – January 28, 2023
- Preceded by: Wayne MacDonald
- Succeeded by: Chris Ager

Member of the New Hampshire House of Representatives from the 22nd Hillsborough district
- In office December 3, 2014 – December 7, 2016 Serving with Peter Hansen, Robert Rowe
- Preceded by: Shannon Chandley
- Succeeded by: Shannon Chandley; Reed Panasiti

Personal details
- Born: July 20, 1951 (age 75) Milton, Massachusetts, U.S.
- Party: Republican
- Education: Villanova University (BS)

Stephen Stepanek (born July 20, 1951) is an American politician from New Hampshire. A member of the Republican Party, he served as chair of the New Hampshire Republican Party from 2019 to 2023.

== Education and background ==
Stepanek attended Villanova University, where he received a B.S. degree in 1975. In 2010, Stepanek confirmed he was arrested for drunk driving.

== Political career ==
=== New Hampshire House of Representatives ===
In 2014, Stepanek was elected to the New Hampshire House of Representatives, representing the town of Amherst in the 22nd Hillsborough district. He did not seek re-election in 2016. During the 2016 presidential election, Stepanek was a New Hampshire co-chair for Donald Trump's campaign.

=== General Services Administration (GSA) ===
On March 5, 2018, the U.S. General Services Administration appointed Stepanek the Regional Administrator of GSA's New England region. As the New England Regional Administrator, Stepanek oversaw all of GSA's operations in New Hampshire, Connecticut, Maine, Massachusetts, Rhode Island and Vermont, including management of federal real estate and information technology.

In this role, he was responsible for an inventory of 419 government-owned or leased buildings and 288 employees. On May 24, 2018, Stepanek resigned from his position with the agency for an undisclosed reason.

=== State party leadership ===
In 2019, Stepanek was elected to lead the New Hampshire Republican State Committee, defeating Keith Hanson, the chair of the Sullivan County Republican Party, by a margin of 300 to 81. In 2021, he was reelected to lead the party with the support of Governor Chris Sununu. Following the 2020 New Hampshire elections, Stepanek chose to step aside as state party chair.

=== 2024 presidential election ===
In 2023, Stepanek was one of those chosen by Donald Trump's presidential campaign to help oversee the candidate's operations in the state ahead of the 2024 New Hampshire Republican primary.

Party political offices
Preceded by Wayne MacDonald	Chair of the New Hampshire Republican Party; 2019–2023	Succeeded by Chris Ager
