= Michelle Stith (politician) =

American politician

Member-elect of the New Hampshire House of Representatives from the Rockingham 35th district
- Assuming office December 2026
- Succeeding: Julius Soti

Personal details
- Party: Democratic

Michelle Stith is an American politician. A member of the Democratic Party, she is the member-elect for the Rockingham 35th district of the New Hampshire House of Representatives.
