= Julius Soti =

American politician

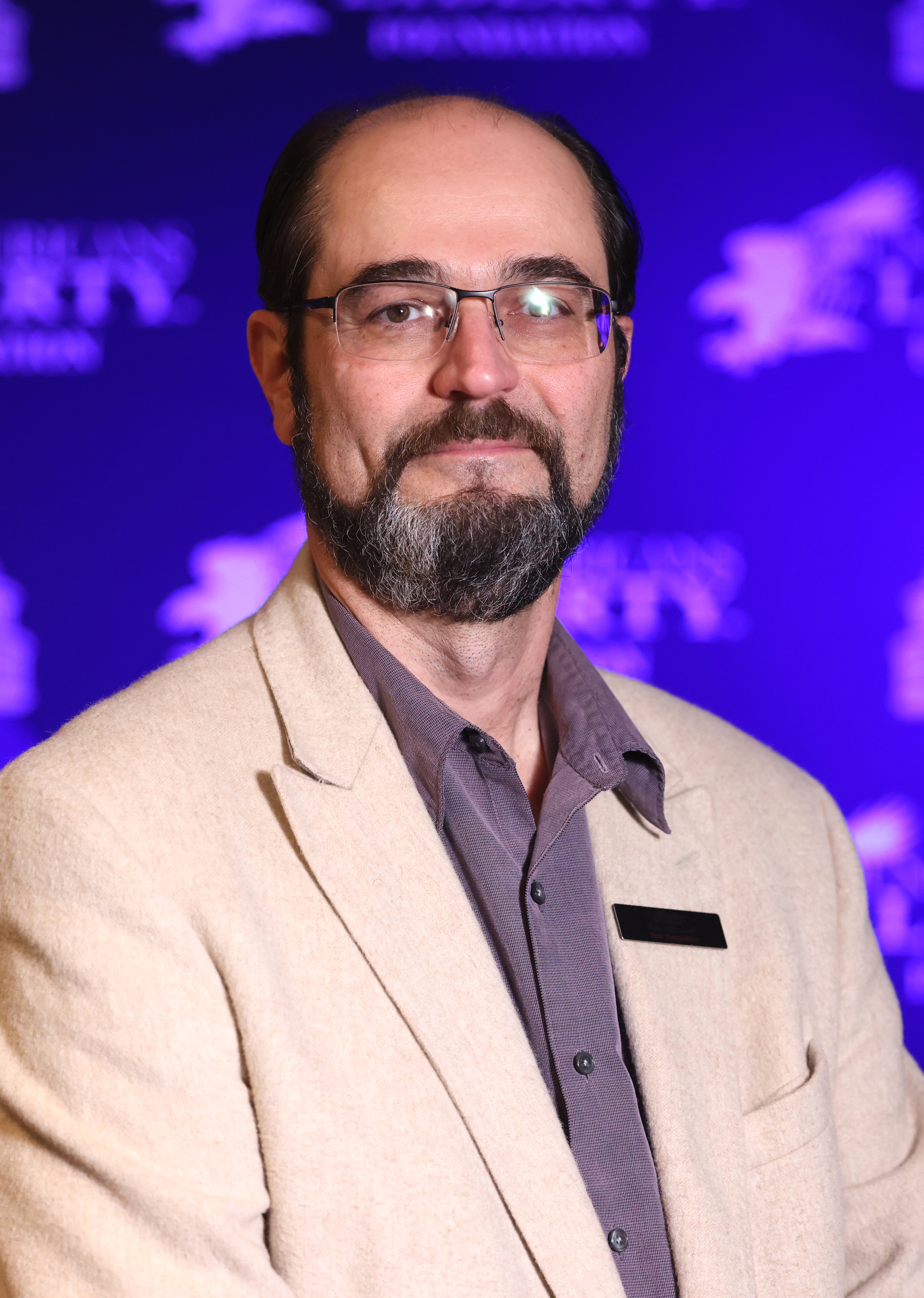
- Soti at the 2024 Hazlitt Summit hosted by Young Americans for Liberty Foundation

Member of the New Hampshire House of Representatives from the Rockingham 7th district
- In office 2020 – December 7, 2022

Member of the New Hampshire House of Representatives from the Rockingham 35th district
- Incumbent
- Assumed office December 7, 2022
- Succeeded by: Michelle Stith (elect)

Personal details
- Party: Republican

Julius Soti is an American politician. A member of the Republican Party, he represents the Rockingham 35th district in the New Hampshire House of Representatives.

In an op-ed for the New Hampshire Union Leader dated August 1, 2023, Soti endorsed conservative radio host Larry Elder for the 2024 Republican presidential nomination. Elder dropped out of the race for the nomination on October 26.
