= Colette Worsman =

American politician

Member of New Hampshire House of Representatives for Belknap 2
- In office 2010–2014

Personal details
- Party: Republican

Colette Worsman is an American politician. She represented Belknap 2nd district at the New Hampshire House of Representatives from 2010 to 2014. Worsman served on a Board of Selectman in Meredith, New Hampshire. She is the mother of two sons.
