= Matt Coker =

American politician

Member of the New Hampshire House of Representatives from the Belknap 2nd district
- Incumbent
- Assumed office December 7, 2022

Personal details
- Party: Republican (2024–)
- Other political affiliations: Democratic (until 2024)

Matt Coker is an American politician. He serves as a Republican member for the Belknap 2nd district of the New Hampshire House of Representatives. Elected as a Democrat, on February 8, 2024, the New Hampshire Republican Party announced that Coker had switched parties, leaving the Democratic caucus and joining the Republican caucus.
