= Robert Greemore =

American politician

Member of New Hampshire House of Representatives for Belknap 2
- In office 2010–2014

Personal details
- Party: Republican

Robert H. "Bob" Greemore, Jr. is an American politician. He represented Belknap 2nd district as a Republican member of the New Hampshire House of Representatives from 2010 to 2014.
