= Lisa DiMartino =

American politician

Member of the New Hampshire House of Representatives
- In office 2012–2014
- Constituency: Belknap District 2

Personal details
- Party: Democratic

Lisa DiMartino is an American politician from New Hampshire. She served in the New Hampshire House of Representatives. She is a disability rights and public health advocate.

DiMartino endorsed the Kamala Harris 2020 presidential campaign.

DiMartino served on the New Hampshire Governor's Commission on Disability and the New Hampshire Medical Care Advisory Committee.
