= Peter Varney =

American politician

Member of the New Hampshire House of Representatives from the Belknap 5th district
- Incumbent
- Assumed office December 3, 2014

Personal details
- Party: Republican
- Spouse: Beth
- Education: University of Canterbury

Peter Varney is a New Hampshire politician, and currently serves in the New Hampshire House of Representatives.

Varney has been serving in the New Hampshire House of Representatives since 2014. He attended the University of Canterbury from 1992 to 1998.
