= Russell Dumais =

American politician

Member of the New Hampshire House of Representatives from the Belknap 6th district
- Incumbent
- Assumed office December 7, 2022

Member of the New Hampshire House of Representatives from the Belknap 2nd district
- In office December 3, 2014 – December 7, 2016

Personal details
- Party: Republican

Russell Dumais is an American politician. He serves as a Republican member for the Belknap 6th district of the New Hampshire House of Representatives.
