= Jonathan Mackie =

American politician

Member of the New Hampshire House of Representatives from the Belknap 2nd district
- In office December 5, 2018 – December 7, 2022

Personal details
- Party: Republican
- Children: 2
- Education: Oyster River High School

Jonathan D. Mackie is a New Hampshire politician.

Mackie graduated from Oyster River High School.

On November 6, 2018, Mackie was elected to the New Hampshire House of Representatives where he represents the Belknap 2 district. Mackie assumed office on December 5, 2018. Mackie is a Republican.

Mackie is married and has two children.

Mackie resides in Meredith, New Hampshire, and has done so since 1984.
