= Lisa Smart (American politician) =

American politician

Member of the New Hampshire House of Representatives from the Belknap 2nd district
- In office December 7, 2022 – December 4, 2024
- Succeeded by: Matthew Lunney

Personal details
- Party: Republican

Lisa Smart is an American politician. She serves as a Republican member for the Belknap 2nd district of the New Hampshire House of Representatives.
