= Richard Beaudoin (politician) =

American politician

Member of the New Hampshire House of Representatives from the 6th district 3rd Belknap (2018-2020)
- Incumbent
- Assumed office December 7, 2022
- In office December 5, 2018 – December 2, 2020

Personal details
- Party: Republican

Richard Beaudoin is a New Hampshire politician currently serving in the New Hampshire House of Representatives.
