= Deanna Jurius =

American politician

Member of the New Hampshire House of Representatives from the Belknap 2nd district
- In office December 5, 2018 – December 2, 2020
- Preceded by: Norman Silber
- Succeeded by: Norman Silber

Personal details
- Born: c. 1992
- Party: Republican
- Education: Inter-Lakes High School; Lancaster Bible College

Deanna Jurius (c. 1992) is a former New Hampshire politician.

Jurius earned a B.S. Biblical studies and a M.Ed. in professional school counseling from Lancaster Bible College in 2016.

Jurius works as a guidance counselor and an upper school teacher at Laconia Christian Academy.

On November 6, 2018, Jurius was elected to the New Hampshire House of Representatives where she represents the Belknap 2 district. Jurius assumed office on December 5, 2018. Jurius is a Republican.

Jurius resides in Meredith, New Hampshire.
