= Harry Bean =

American politician (1954–2026)

Member of the New Hampshire House of Representatives from the Belknap 2nd district
- In office December 5, 2018 – February 14, 2026

Personal details
- Born: December 5, 1954 Laconia, New Hampshire, U.S.
- Died: February 14, 2026 (aged 71) Boston, Massachusetts, U.S.
- Party: Republican
- Children: 3

Harry Herbert Bean (December 5, 1954 – February 14, 2026) was an American politician in the state of New Hampshire. He was a Republican.

== Life and career ==
Bean was born in Laconia on December 5, 1954, and had a high-school education.

On November 6, 2018, Bean was elected to the New Hampshire House of Representatives where he represented the Belknap 2 district. He assumed office on December 5, 2018.

Bean was married and had three children. He resided in Gilford, New Hampshire. Bean died at a hospital in Boston on February 14, 2026, at the age of 71.
