= Statue of Franklin Pierce =

Statue in Concord, New Hampshire

Franklin Pierce
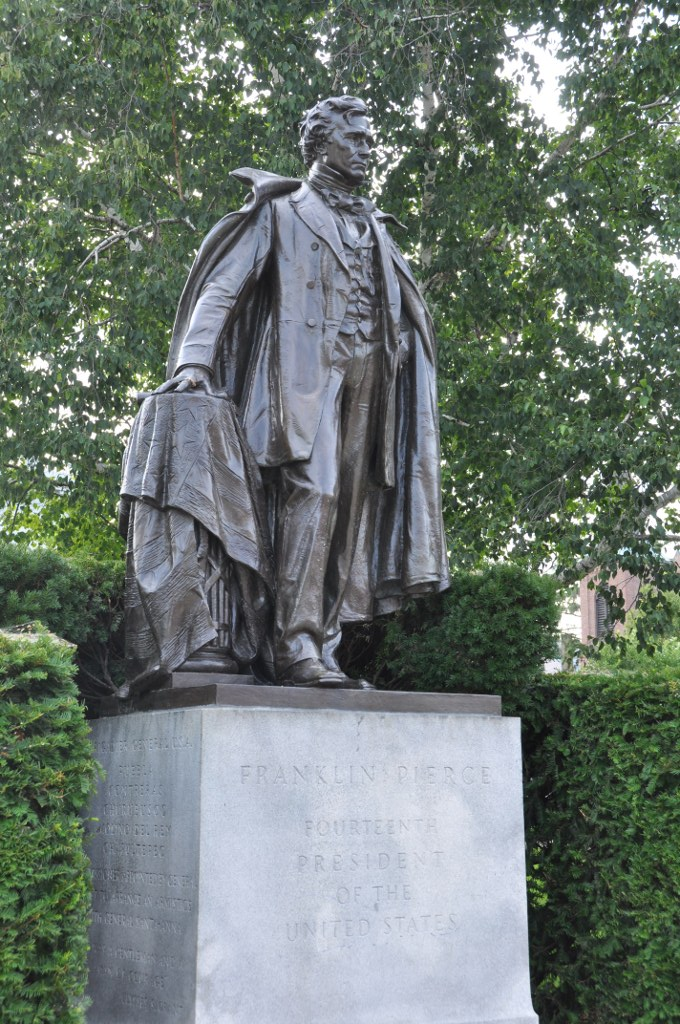
- The statue in 2013
- Interactive map of Franklin Pierce
- Location: New Hampshire State House, Concord, New Hampshire, United States
- Coordinates: 43°12′25″N 71°32′12.5″W
- Designer: Henry Augustus Lukeman
- Fabricator: Jno. Williams, Inc.
- Material: Bronze; Granite
- Length: 48 inches (120 cm)
- Width: 62 inches (160 cm)
- Height: 13 feet 3 inches (4.04 m)
- Weight: 2,230 pounds (1,010 kg) (Statue only)
- Beginning date: 1913
- Completion date: October 15, 1914
- Dedicated date: November 25, 1914
- Dedicated to: Franklin Pierce

Franklin Pierce is a monumental statue on the grounds of the New Hampshire State House in Concord, New Hampshire, United States. The monument, consisting of a bronze statue atop a granite pedestal, honors Franklin Pierce, the only person from New Hampshire to be the president of the United States, serving in the 1850s. It was designed by sculptor Henry Augustus Lukeman and unveiled in 1914.

The idea of a statue honoring Pierce was first proposed in 1888 by United States Senator William E. Chandler of New Hampshire. However, the proposal was opposed by Republicans and members of the Grand Army of the Republic.They viewed Pierce, a Democrat, as a bad president whose pro-Southern United States and anti-abolitionist policies contributed to sectional tensions that ultimately led to the American Civil War. Over the next several decades, Republicans, who dominated New Hampshire's politics, blocked numerous attempts to memorialize Pierce. However, a rift in the Republican Party during the 1912 elections gave Democrats control of New Hampshire's government for the first time in several decades, and in 1913, the government finally approved a bill to honor Pierce with a statue on the grounds of the state house. The statue was dedicated on November 25, 1914. According to historian Michael J. Connolly, the statue's creation coincided with a changing view of the Civil War wherein the focus on slavery was downplayed and attention instead focused on national reconciliation.

== History ==
=== Background ===
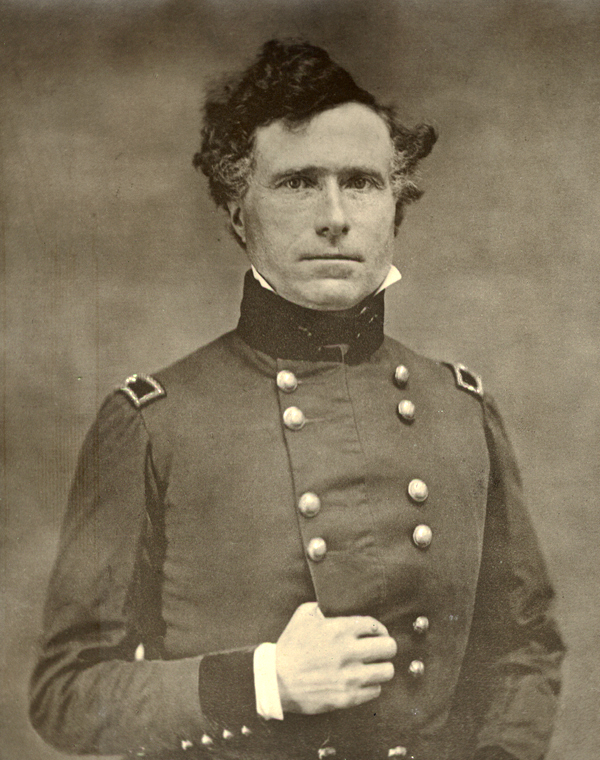
1852 daguerreotype of Franklin Pierce

Franklin Pierce was born in 1804 as the son of noted New Hampshire politician Benjamin Pierce. He graduated from Bowdoin College in 1824, after which he entered into a lengthy career in law and politics. By the late 1830s, he had served stints in the New Hampshire General Court, the United States House of Representatives, and the United States Senate. During the 1852 Democratic National Convention, the Democratic Party nominated Pierce as their candidate for president of the United States, and he was elected in a landslide victory over Winfield Scott, the Whig Party's nominee, in the general election, becoming the nation's 14th president.

As president, Pierce became embroiled in controversy due to his support of the Kansas–Nebraska Act, which many anti-slavery advocates in the Democratic Party criticized for allowing the spread of slavery and for heightening the divide between the slave states and free states. Facing charges from abolitionists in the Northern United States that he was a doughface, meaning he supported the slave-owning interests of the Southern United States, the Democratic Party declined to renominate Pierce for the 1856 election. After leaving office, Pierce returned to New Hampshire and, during the American Civil War, he openly criticized the Union's war efforts and Abraham Lincoln's handling of the war, prompting many in the Republican Party to consider Pierce a copperhead, meaning he supported the Confederate States of America and was opposed to the war. Pierce died in 1869. He was the first and only president to hail from New Hampshire.

At the time of his death, historians' opinions of Pierce's legacy were mostly negative. Historians largely viewed the actions of Pierce and his presidential successor, James Buchanan, as contributing to heightening tensions that ultimately led to civil war. Critics of his accused him of compromising his morals in order to placate Southern interests with regards to slavery, while supporters of his largely attempted to justify his actions as a result of political pragmatism and party loyalty rather than an indication of some moral failing or poor judgement.

=== Early memorial efforts ===
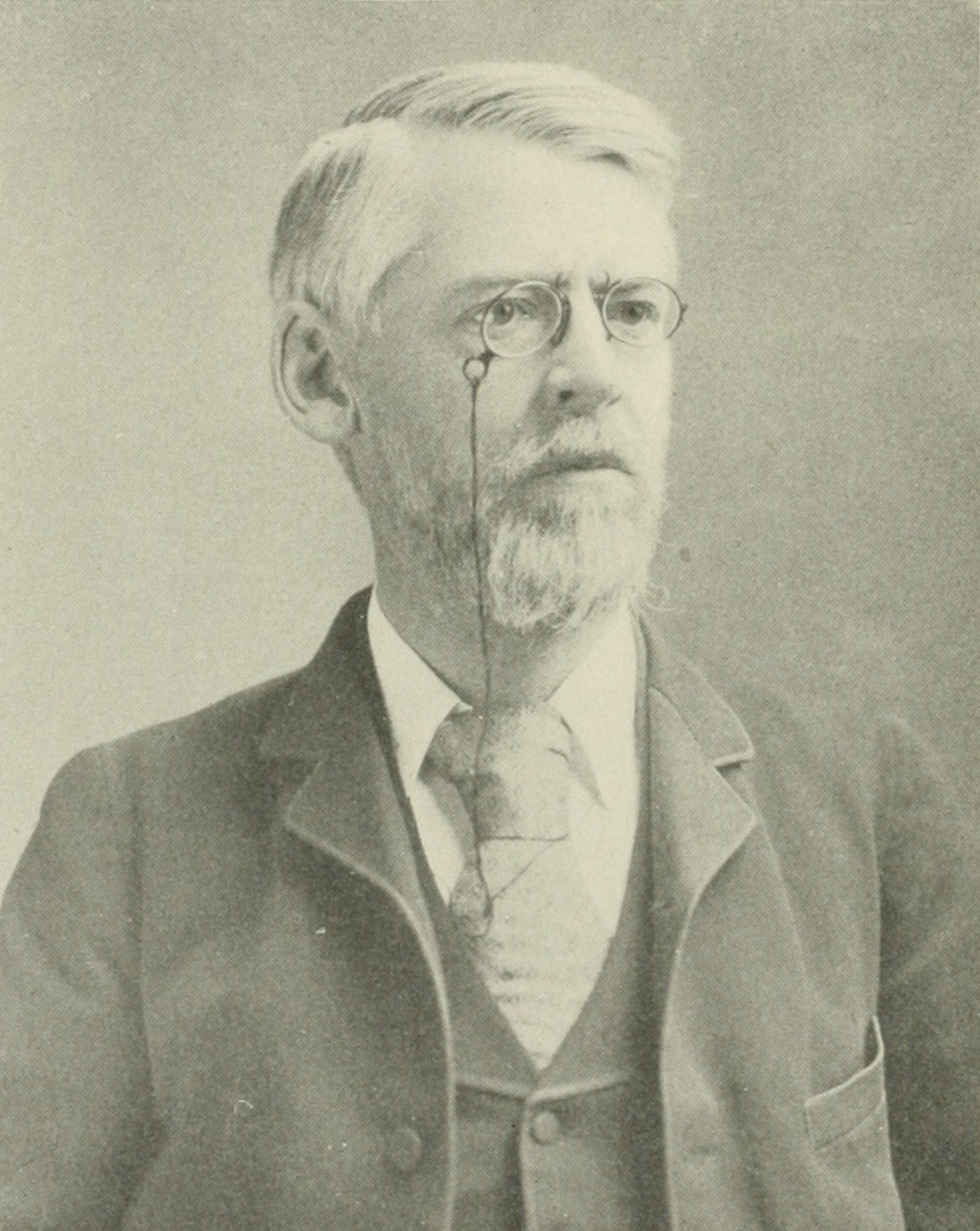
Efforts to erect a monument to Pierce, which was first proposed by Senator William E. Chandler (pictured 1899) in 1888, remained the subject of partisan debate for several decades.

Beginning in 1860 and lasting into the 1910s, the Republican Party was the dominant political party in New Hampshire and counted among their members many Union Army veterans, including members of the Grand Army of the Republic. As a result, in 1888, when Senator William E. Chandler of New Hampshire first proposed the erection of a memorial for Pierce, the measure was vociferously opposed by Republicans on the grounds of both not wanting to honor a noted Democratic politician as well as an individual who had been vehemently opposed to the Union's war efforts. In the ensuing years, the view of the Grand Army of the Republic's members largely held that Pierce had been a traitor, with one veteran from Claremont, New Hampshire, calling him "a lasting disgrace to New Hampshire", and Republicans blocked many future efforts to erect a statue to Pierce.

In 1893, Chandler, a Republican, led a campaign to erect two statues in the National Statuary Hall of the United States Capitol. Chandler promised Democratic politicians in the state that, if they would support his measure, he would support their campaign for a statue of Pierce to be erected on the grounds of the New Hampshire State House in Concord, New Hampshire. However, while the National Statuary Hall bills passed into law, Republican legislators blocked passage of the bill for the Pierce statue. In 1901, Chandler, attempting to keep his promise to the Democratic politicians, again pushed for a monument to be erected of Pierce, but again to no avail. During the 1909 legislative session, the Republican-dominated legislature again rejected a bill to fund a public statue of Pierce, as well as a different bill which would have honored Pierce and his father by naming a bridge across the Merrimack River in Concord the "Pierce Memorial Bridge".

In 1911, another Pierce statue bill was approved by the legislature's Committee on Public Improvements and in late February came to the floor of the New Hampshire House of Representatives for discussion. This bill was sponsored by representative Irad E. Keeler of Concord, a Republican, and led to a split in the Republican representatives. While Keeler supported the statue primarily on the grounds of national reconciliation and in honoring a favorite son, other Republicans in the House, including many members of the Grand Army of the Republic, opposed the bill for similar reasons in past debates. One representative stated that he would not consider any monument to Pierce until monuments honoring New Hampshire's war dead were erected on every Civil War battlefield in the Southern United States, while another sarcastically questioned whether the new monument should read "our only President" or "our disgrace". The height of the debate came on February 22 when representative Rosecrans W. Pillsbury stated, "it was a poor time—on Washington's birthday—to press a measure for the erection of a monument to a traitor". The discussions elicited responses from the press, with the Concord Daily Patriot newspaper suggesting a statewide referendum on the statue, while the Concord Daily Monitor printed a letter to the editor from Edgar Aldrich, a United States federal judge, who expressed dismay at the legislators' insults. Despite the debates, the bill passed through the Committee on Appropriations and managed to pass with a vote in the House on April 4, but was promptly rejected in a 10—6 vote in the New Hampshire Senate on April 10. Following this, the Daily Patriot floated the idea of a public subscription campaign in order to raise funds for the statue.

=== 1913 monument bill ===
During the 1912 United States elections, a rift within the Republican Party concerning its more progressive members helped the Democratic Party, leading to the election of Woodrow Wilson as only the second Democratic president since the end of the Civil War. In New Hampshire, Democrats took control of both chambers of the legislature and the governorship, prompting the Daily Patriot to write in January 1913 that they expected a Pierce statue bill to pass that legislative session. On January 7, representative Guy H. Cutter proposed a bill allocating $15,000 (equivalent to $477,000 in 2024) in state funds to the erection of a monument on the state house grounds honoring Pierce, (Note: A value of $16,000 (equivalent to $509,000 in 2024) is given in a 2013 article about the monument written by historian Michael J. Connolly and published in The Journal of the Gilded Age and Progressive Era. However, the entry for this monument on the Smithsonian Institution Research Information System (SIRIS) states that the state allocated $15,000 for the monument. Additionally, a publication released by the government of New Hampshire to commemorate the monument's dedication prints the text of the bill allocating funds for the statue, which calls for "a sum not exceeding fifteen thousand dollars".) and with support from other legislators, such as Chandler, the bill quickly passed through the Committee on Public Improvements. Unlike in previous sessions, critics against the statue were less concerned with Pierce's legacy and focused more on financial considerations. Local newspapers argued that a more economical way of honoring Pierce would be in the naming of a new government building or mountain, and in February of that year, in partial response, the government passed a bill naming one of the White Mountains Mount Pierce. On May 13, the bill, having passed through both chambers of the legislature, was signed into law by New Hampshire Governor Samuel D. Felker.

According to historian Michael J. Connolly, the passage of the monument bill coincided with a general reevaluation of Pierce that was occurring during the early 20th century, with historians' views of Pierce that focused on his political pragmatism and adherence to rule of law. According to Connolly, the reevaluation was fueled primarily by Progressive Era anxieties regarding society and race relations, and in this atmosphere, some historians attributed to Pierce:

a superior wisdom, an admirable level-headedness in a hyper-emotional age, and a practical political sense more in tune with humans as they were, rather than abolition's idealistic and dogmatic fantasies on how they should be

Connolly also points to two recent events, the federal funding of a monument to President John Tyler in 1911 and the 1913 Gettysburg reunion, as contributing to the bill's passage, as both events aligned with the Pierce statue supporters' focus on national reconciliation and political harmony. (Note: The creation of a monument to Tyler, which was funded by a bill passed by the United States Congress in 1911 and overseen by the United States Department of War between 1912 and 1913, was considered influential in the passing of the Pierce statue bill because, following his presidency, Tyler served in the Provisional Congress of the Confederate States of America. Per Connolly, Pierce statue supporters saw the Congressional support of Tyler as an indication of a changing attitude towards individuals who had a controversial legacy connected to the Civil War. Additionally, the Gettysburg reunion reflected a changing view of the overall nature of the Civil War, with historian David W. Blight saying, "The war was remembered primarily as a tragedy that led to greater unity and national cohesion, and as a soldiers' call to sacrifice in order to save a troubled, and essentially good, Union, not as the crisis of a nation deeply divided over slavery, race, competing definitions of labor, liberty, political economy, and the future of the West, issues hardly resolved in 1913".)

=== Creation ===
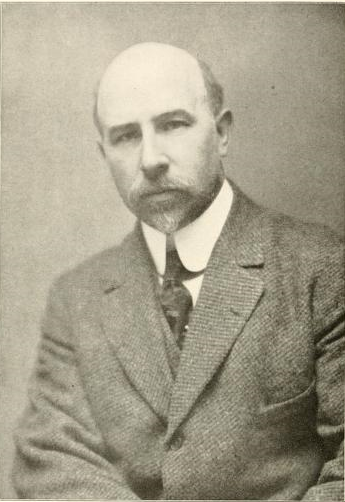
The monument was designed by sculptor Henry Augustus Lukeman (pictured c. 1914).

On July 11, the governor created the Pierce Statue Committee in order to oversee the monument's erection, appointing to the committee several politicians and businessmen, including Aldrich and Chandler. Henry F. Hollis, a newly-elected Democratic Senator from New Hampshire, and his brother, Allen, urged the committee to select sculptor Daniel Chester French, their uncle, to design the monument. French, a New Hampshire native, said he would be willing to design the statue, but that he would need three years to complete the work due to preexisting projects of his, which was considered outside of the schedule set by the committee. Instead, French joined the committee and recommended for the position Henry Augustus Lukeman, a New York City-based sculptor. Lukeman was considered a protégé of both French and fellow sculptor Augustus Saint-Gaudens. On November 7, Lukeman met with the committee and, after discussing plans and inspecting the state house grounds, the committee voted to extend an invitation for Lukeman to submit a model of his design for their consideration.

In designing the statue, Lukeman consulted Kirk D. Pierce, Franklin Pierce's nephew. On December 31, Lukeman presented a model of his statue to the committee at the New Hampshire Historical Society, the design of which the committee accepted. Reports in January 1914 stated that the full-size statue was expected to be completely executed by October 15 of that year. Casting of the statue was carried out by Jno. Williams, Inc. of New York City. Meanwhile, several committee members worked with Governor Felker to decide the location of the statue on the state house grounds and the inscriptions that would appear on the statue's pedestal. In addition to the statue itself, Lukeman also worked on the overall design of the surrounding area, including the installation and design of several nearby electroliers. (Note: An electrolier is a type of light fixture.) In total, the monument cost $14,500 (equivalent to $455,000 in 2024).

=== Dedication ===
Controversy arose over plans for the dedication ceremony concerning the invited guests. In an attempt to highlight the healing of the rift between the northern and southern states following the Civil War, Governor Felker suggested inviting a Southern Democrat, prompting him to extend an invitation to President Wilson, a native of Virginia. Senator Hollis told the governor that Senator Hoke Smith of Georgia would be willing to speak at the ceremony, while Republican Senator Jacob H. Gallinger invited Francis S. White, a former senator from Alabama and veteran of the Confederate States Army. This prompted Otis G. Hammond, the director of the New Hampshire Historical Society, to write to Chandler concerning White's involvement, saying it was:

a serious error, serving only to revive a sectional feeling which has happily subsided ... These old charges of copperheadism [sic] against the President, unjust and unreasonable, have now somewhat subsided, and I should think it was hardly the best of judgment to revive them again.

Ultimately, neither White nor Wilson attended the ceremony.

The monument was dedicated on November 25, 1914, (Note: According to a publication released by the government of New Hampshire to commemorate the monument's dedication, the dedication was planned to be held earlier, but was delayed due to unspecified circumstances.) with several hundred spectators attending the ceremony in spite of poor weather that day. Ceremonies commenced at 11 a.m. with a procession from the Eagle Hotel to the site of the statue on the state house grounds. Music for the event was provided by Nevers' Third Regiment Band. Politician Clarence E. Carr served as the president of the event, which featured speeches from Oliver W. Branch, Aldrich, Chandler, Felker, and Carr himself, among others. The statue was unveiled by Susan Pierce, a grandniece of Franklin's. According to Connolly, there was a lack of consistency regarding Pierce's legacy, as speakers alternated in offering praise and criticism of the former president. Additionally, Connolly states that, as with the 1913 Gettysburg reunion, the ceremony contained "racial significance", as Pierce's rehabilitation during this time was part of a broader era of heightened racial tension in the United States.

=== Later history ===
In 1994, the statue was surveyed as part of the Save Outdoor Sculpture! initiative. In 2020, amidst the nationwide George Floyd protests and calls from some students at the University of New Hampshire to remove Pierce's name from the name of the university's School of Law, the Concord Monitor published an opinion piece from historian and editor emeritus Mike Pride wherein he discussed the statue's possible removal or relocation.

== Design ==
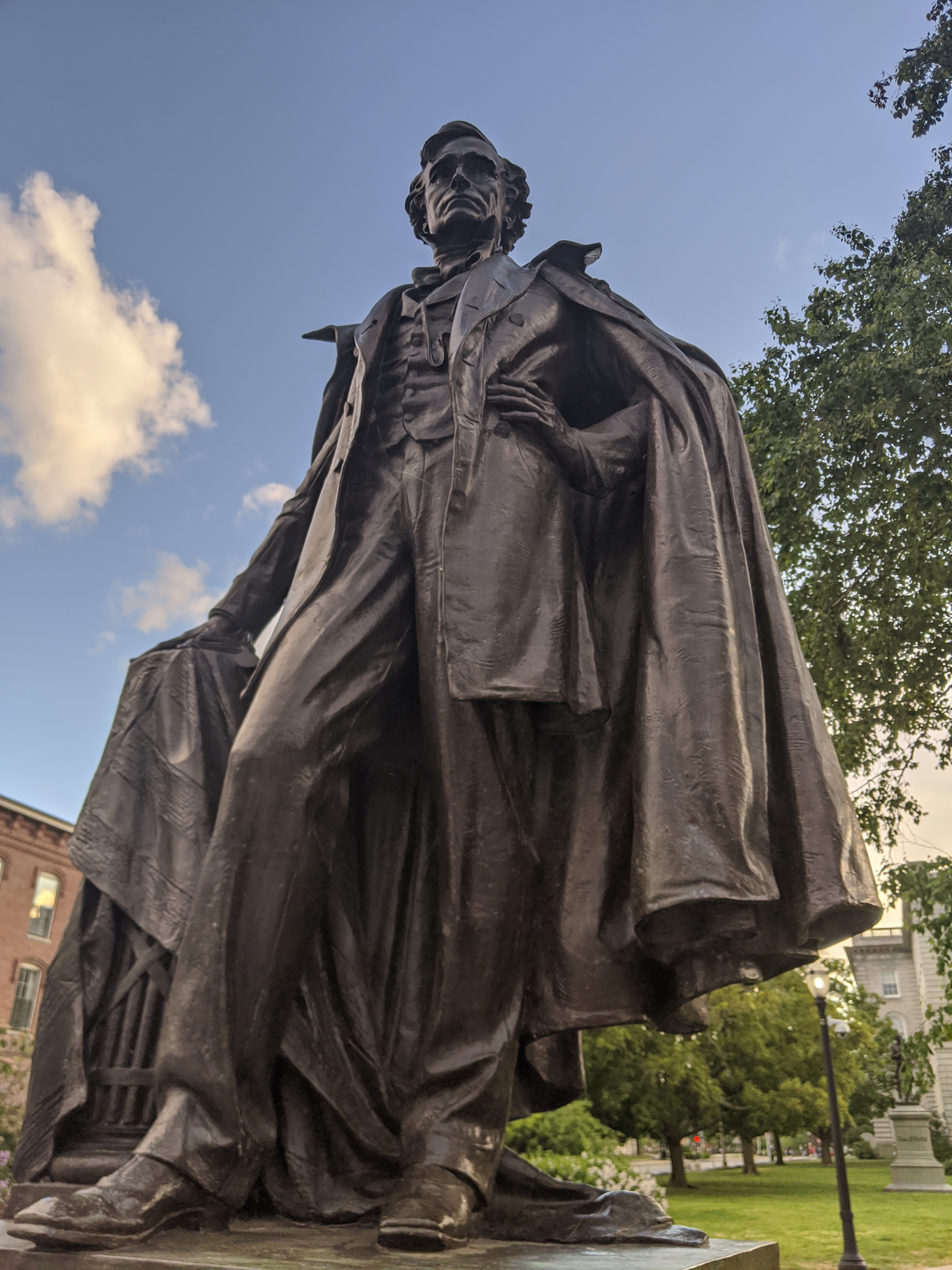
A closeup of the statue in 2020

The monument consists of a bronze (Note: The alloy of bronze used in the statue's creation consisted of 90 percent copper and 10 percent of a mixture of tin and zinc.) sculpture showing Pierce dressed in typical 1850s clothing, including a long dress coat, a bow tie, and a military cloak. He is standing with his right leg extended outward, with his left hand on his hip and his right hand resting on a pedestal consisting of a fasces draped with the American flag. The statue weighs 2,230 pounds (1,010 kg) and stands approximately 8 feet (2.4 m) tall, with side measurements of 55 by 38 inches (140 by 97 cm), while the granite pedestal supporting the sculpture is approximately 63 inches (160 cm) tall and has side measurements of 62 inches (160 cm) by 48 inches (120 cm). The bronze base of the statue contains markings from both the sculptor ("Augustus Lukeman Sc. / 1914") and the foundry ("Jno. Williams Inc. Founders N.Y.").

The monument is located on a brick plaza that is set two steps above the surrounding sidewalk and is surrounded by a granite curb on its sides and rear. This plaza takes the general form of an exedra from Ancient Greek architecture, covering an ovular shape with a depth of 12 feet (3.7 m) and a width of 35 feet (11 m). On either end of this exedra are granite pedestals supporting bronze electroliers. The pedestal bears the following inscriptions:

Franklin Pierce / Fourteenth / President / of the / United States

— Front

Born at Hillsborough, New Hampshire / November 23, 1804 / A Lawyer Who Loved His Profession / And Was a Great Leader in It / Member of New Hampshire Legislature / At 25 and Speaker at 27 / Congressman at 29 / United States Senator at 32 and / Resigned at 37 / Later in Life Declined the Office Of / Attorney General of the United / States, That of Secretary of War, / the United States Senatorship, and / the Governorship of His State. / President of the New Hampshire / Constitutional Convention / President of the United States / Died at Concord October 8, 1869

— Side

Brigadier General U.S.A. / Puebla / Contrearas / Cherubusco / Molino Del Rey / Chapultepec / Commissioner Appointed by General / Scott To Arrange an Armistice / With General Santa Anna / ‘He Was a Gentleman and A / Man of Courage.’ / Ulysses S. Grant

— Side

Erected by the / State of New Hampshire / 1914

— Rear

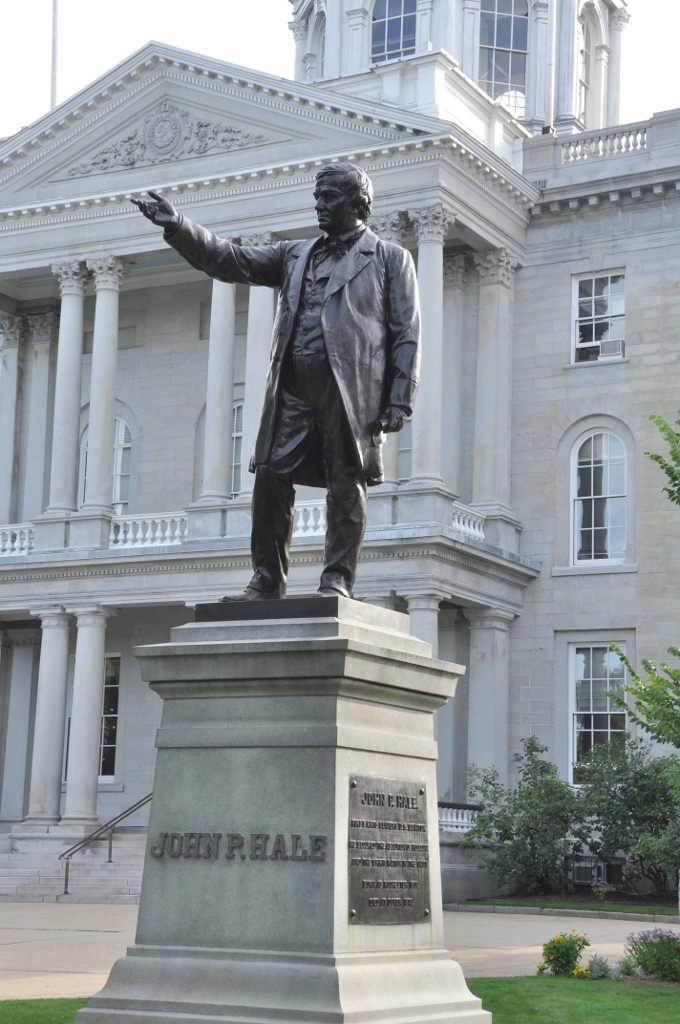
The Pierce statue is located in the direction of the outstretched arm of a statue of abolitionist John P. Hale.

The monument is situated on the southern grounds of the state house, south of the Soldiers and Sailors Memorial Arch. It was erected to the east of an existing statue of John P. Hale, an abolitionist politician and contemporary of Pierce's, who has his hand outstretched towards the Pierce statue. In 1915, during a visit to Concord, the editor of the Boston Herald asked Chandler if the placement had been a deliberate choice in showing Hale condemning Pierce. Chandler acknowledged the coincidence, but denied any intention, further responding to the editor, "I must insist that the arm does not point the accusing finger, but the hand of friendship. Will you accept the idea?"

== See also ==
- List of sculptures of presidents of the United States

== Sources ==
- "Franklin Pierce Statue". The American Architect. CV (1988): 3. January 28, 1914.
- Connolly, Michael J. (April 2013). ""History has rendered its verdict upon him": The Franklin Pierce Statue Controversy". The Journal of the Gilded Age and Progressive Era. 12 (2). Cambridge University Press: 234–259. doi:10.1017/S1537781413000078. ISSN 1537-7814. JSTOR 43902950.
- Doe, John (January 10, 1914). "Boston". American Art News. XII (14): 7.
- Metcalf, Henry Harrison, ed. (1914). Dedication of a Statue of General Franklin Pierce, Fourteenth President of the United States. Concord, New Hampshire: The Rumford Press.
- Morgan, James (1924). Our Presidents: Brief Biographies of Our Chief Magistrates. New York City: The Macmillan Company. OCLC 1049417225.
- Pride, Mike (June 17, 2020). "Franklin Pierce statue was criticized even before its creation". Concord Monitor. Newspapers of New England, Inc. Archived from the original on March 20, 2023.}
- "Franklin Pierce, (sculpture)". Smithsonian Institution Research Information System. Archived from the original on March 13, 2024.
- Spain, James W. (January 22, 2019a). "Blast From the Past: Reflecting on the dedication of the Franklin Pierce statue". The Concord Insider. Archived from the original on March 13, 2024.
- Watson, John H., ed. (January 1914). "From the Tool Chest". The Reporter. XLVII (1). Chicago: Nichols & Co.: 23–25.
