= New Hampshire Legislative Office Building =

- Old Post Office
- U.S. National Register of Historic Places
- U.S. Historic district – Contributing property
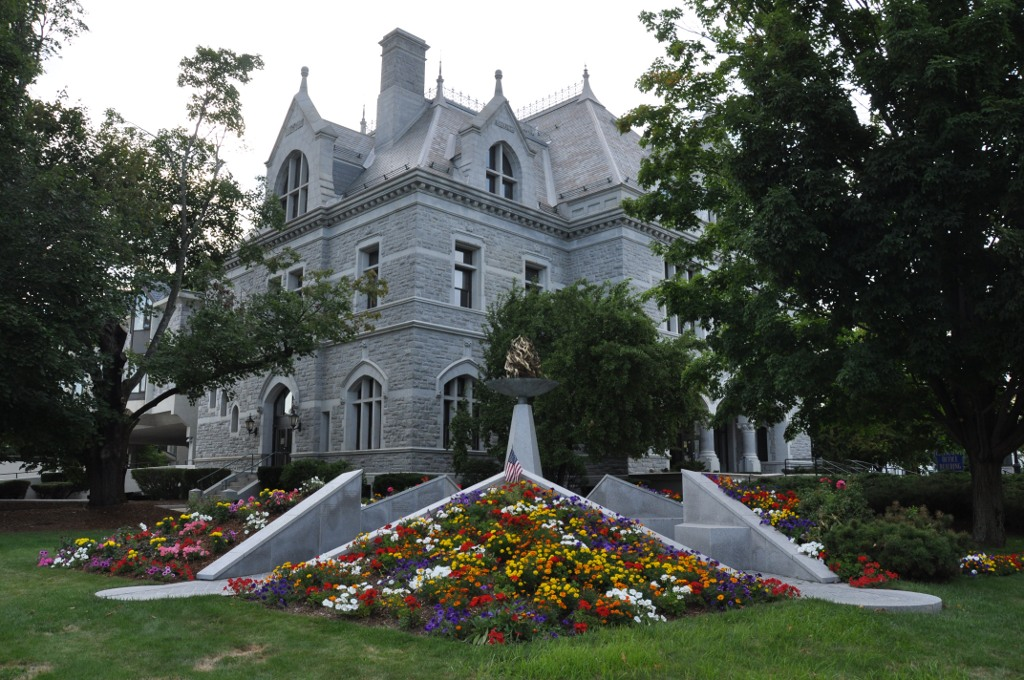

- Location within New Hampshire Location within the United States
- Location: 33 N. State St., Concord, New Hampshire
- Coordinates: 43°12′23″N 71°32′24″W
- Area: 1.5 acres (0.61 ha)
- Built: 1884
- Architect: James Riggs Hill
- Architectural style: Late Victorian
- Part of: Concord Civic District (ID83004203)
- NRHP reference No.: 73000269

Significant dates
- Added to NRHP: August 13, 1973
- Designated CP: December 22, 1983

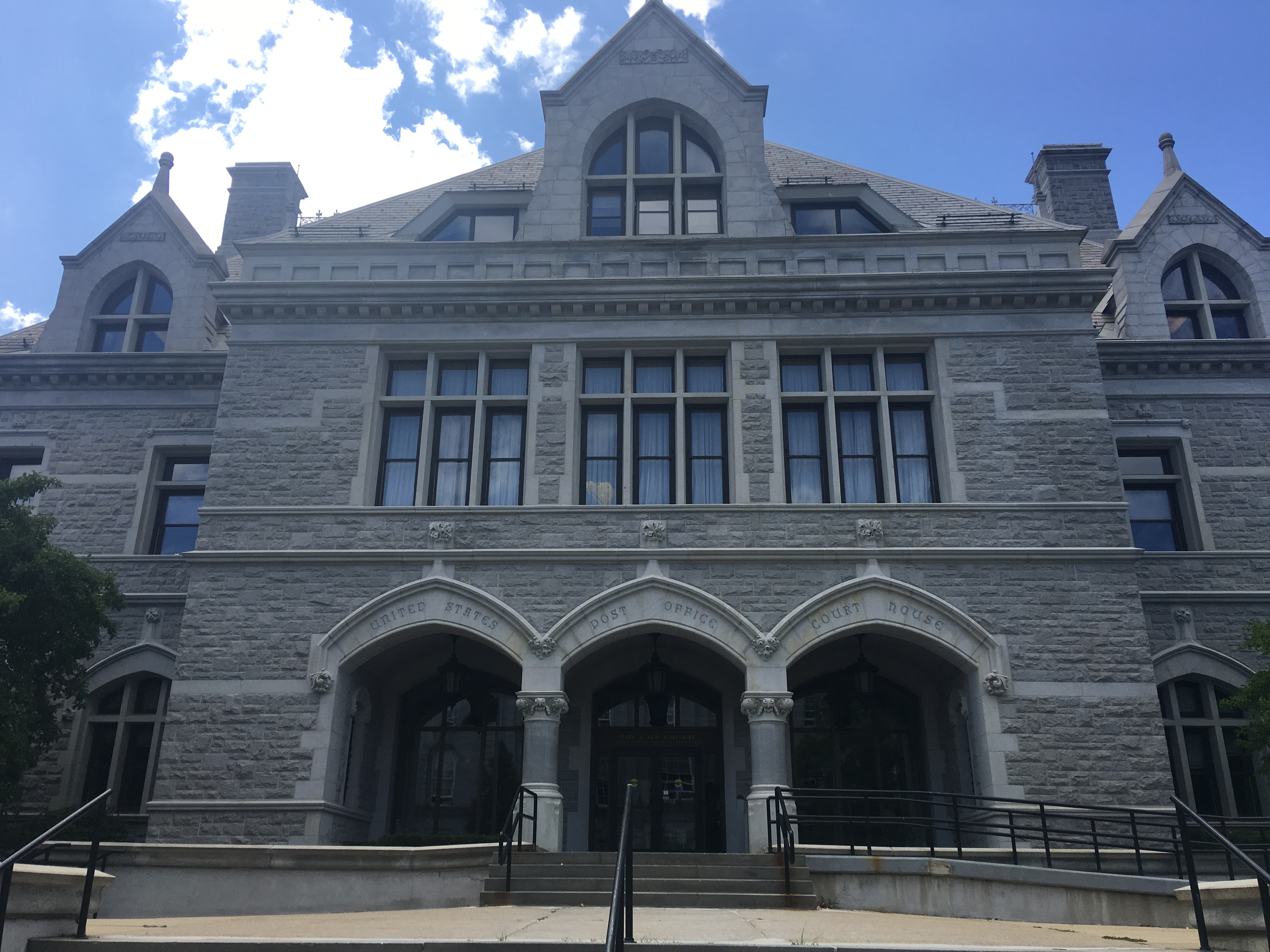
Entrance to the Old Post Office

The Legislative Office Building of the New Hampshire State Legislature is a government office building across North State Street from the New Hampshire State House in Concord, New Hampshire. Built in 1889, it is one of the state's largest buildings built out of locally quarried granite. It was originally used as a post office and is listed on the National Register of Historic Places as the Old Post Office. It was also included in the Concord Civic District in 1983.

== Description and history ==
New Hampshire's Legislative Office Building is located just west of the state capitol, occupying an entire city block bounded by North State Street, Capitol Street, Park Street, and Green Street. It is a large two-story granite structure, built in the Richardsonian Romanesque style, with a Chateauesque hip roof crowned by iron cresting. The walls are finished in a rough-hewn texture, although the walls of the raised basement are smooth. The main facade faces east, and is dominated by an arcade of three squat Gothic arches supported by smooth round pillars.

The main portion of the building was built between 1884 and 1889 for the federal government to a design by James Riggs Hill, the United States Treasury Department's Supervising Architect. The building was twice extended, in 1913 and 1938. When first built, it housed not only the post office, but other federal offices and the federal district court. The federal government occupied the building until 1967. The building was afterward acquired by the state and converted for use as legislative offices.

== See also ==
- National Register of Historic Places listings in Merrimack County, New Hampshire
