= Bibliography of Holyoke =

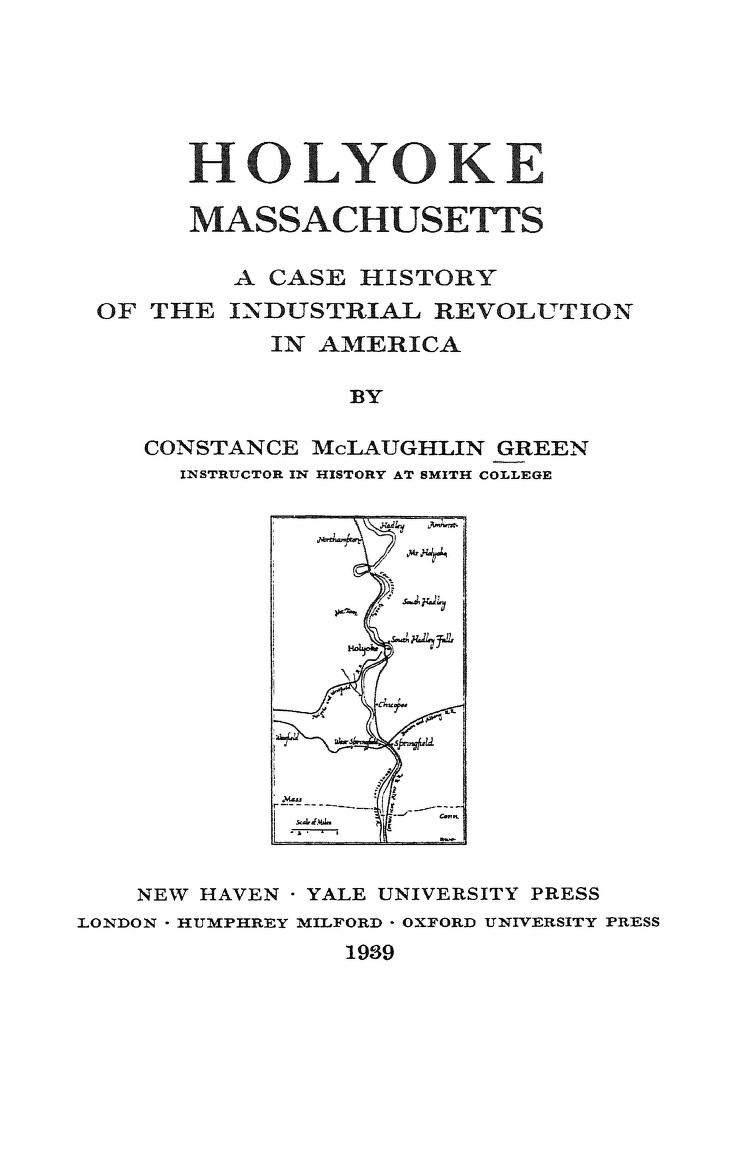
Pulitzer Prize winner Constance McLaughlin Green's case history of Holyoke, among the earliest academic works of urban history, Green's doctoral thesis was widely published by Yale University Press upon receiving the university's Eggleston Award in History

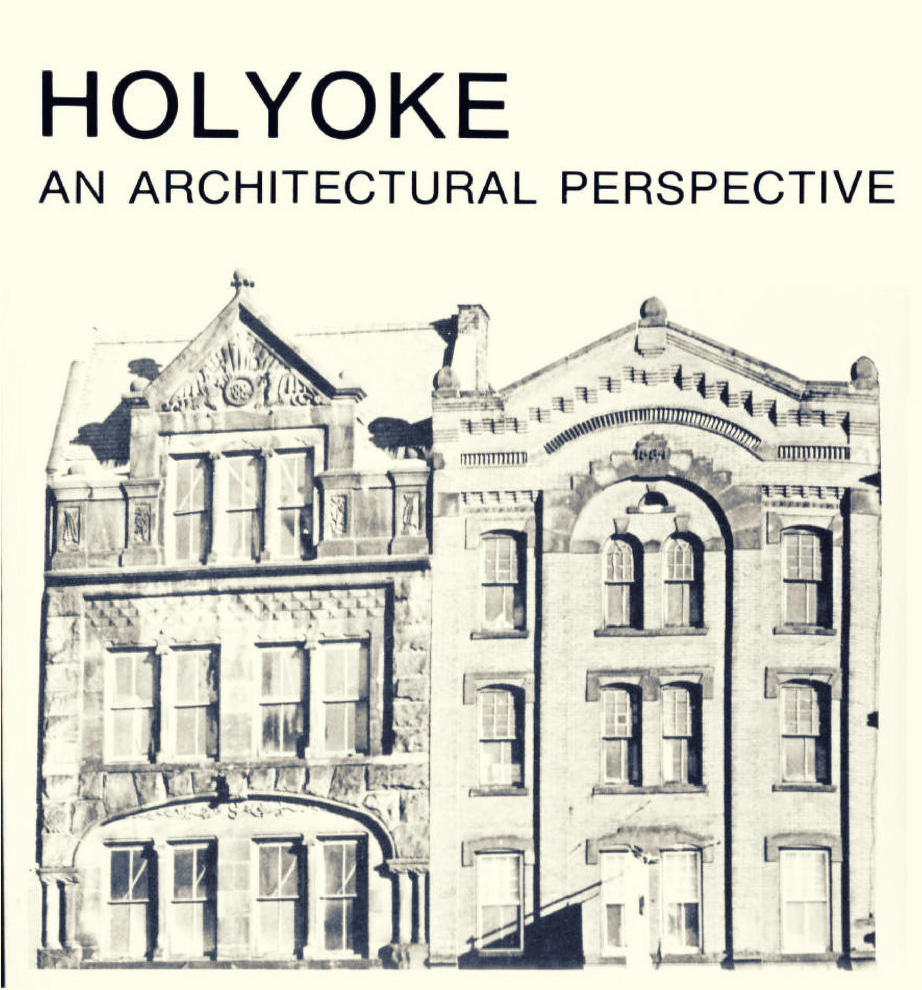
Holyoke: An Architectural Perspective, a pictorial of architectural features and motifs of the city's many historic buildings; seen here are the Swift (left), and Nightingale (right) blocks, since demolished

This is a bibliography of Holyoke, a city in Massachusetts, with books about the area's history, culture, geography, and people. Due to the area's proximity to a number of industrial developments and the numerous cultures of different waves of immigrant workers, a wide number of books, dissertations, and comprehensive articles have been written about Holyoke throughout its history in several languages. This list is not intended to be complete, authoritative, or exhaustive and does not include promotional material, travel guides, recipe books, directories, or the catalogs of industrial companies that have resided therein.

== Nonfiction ==
=== Architecture and engineering ===
- Barrett, Robert E. The History of the Holyoke Water Power Company; A Subsidiary of Northeast Utilities, 1859-1967 (PDF). Holyoke, Mass. Archived from the original (PDF) on 2019-12-12 – via Holyoke Gas & Electric.
- Barrett, Robert E., ed. (1951). Hydro Electric Development - Hadley Falls Station. Holyoke Water Power Company.
- Cumbler, John T. (2001). "Holyoke: The Epitome of a New England Mill Town". Reasonable Use: The People, the Environment, and the State, New England... Oxford University Press. pp. 41–48. ISBN 978-0-19-513813-9.
- Dickey, John L. (1971). Holyoke: An Architectural Perspective. Holyoke Savings Bank.
- Herschel, Clemens (1907). "History of the Invention". The Venturi Water Meter and the First Twenty Years of its Existence. New York: Privately published. pp. 3–19.
- Herschel, Clemens (February 17, 1886). "On the Work Done for the Preservation of the Dam at Holyoke, Mass., in 1885, and on Some Studies for a New Stone Dam for the Same Place". Transactions of the American Society of Civil Engineers. XV: 543–580.
- Kammerer, J. C.; Baldwin, H. L. (1962). Water Problems in the Springfield-Holyoke Area, Massachusetts; A layman's look at water in a metropolitan area (PDF). Washington D.C.: United States Geological Survey (USGS); U.S. Government Printing Office. doi:10.3133/wsp1670. Archived from the original (PDF) on 2019-05-04.
- Lucey, P. J. (September 7, 1920). "The Holyoke Water Works, and its Rainfall and Stream-Flow Measurements". Journal of the New England Water Works Association. XXXIV: 323–352.
- Manning, George E. (1900). "Notes on Engineering Work at Holyoke, Mass". Proceeding of the Connecticut Civil Engineers and Surveyors Association, at Its Summer Meeting Held at Holyoke, Mass. July 18, 1899. New London, Conn.: The Day Publishing Co.; Connecticut Civil Engineers and Surveyors Association: 143–158.
- Olmsted Jr., Frederick Law (1908). Preliminary Report of Frederick L. Olmsted, Jr. Relative to Beautifying the City of Holyoke. Holyoke, Mass.: M. J. Doyle Printing Company.
- Olmsted, John Charles; Olmsted Jr., Frederick Law (1908). #2365 City of Holyoke, Mass. Brookline, Mass.: Olmsted Brothers, Landscape Architects. [Companion piece to Preliminary Report of Frederick L. Olmsted Jr...]
- Small, Roy (2013). Reanimating the Machine (Master of Landscape Architecture thesis). Providence, R.I.: Rhode Island School of Design (RISD).
- Williams, Gardner S. (December 1904). "Turbine and Water Wheels". Modern Machinery. Vol. XVI, no. 6. Chicago: Modern Machinery Publishing Company. pp. 518–523.

- Williams, Gardner S. (January 1905). "Turbine and Water Wheels, [pt. II]". Modern Machinery. Vol. XVII, no. 1. Chicago: Modern Machinery Publishing Company. pp. 26–34, 44–48.

=== Culture and ethnicity ===
- Borges-Méndez, Ramón (1994). Urban and Regional Restructuring and Barrio Formation in Massachusetts: The Cases of Lowell, Lawrence and Holyoke (PDF) (Master of City Planning). Massachusetts Institute of Technology. pp. 150, 243–248. Archived from the original (PDF) on July 29, 2018.
- Brahinsky, Rachel (1996). Ni para atras ni para coger impulso : life in Puerto Rican Holyoke (Div III). Hampshire College. OCLC 36622449.
- Bunk, Brian D. (September 2011). "The Rise and Fall of Professional Soccer in Holyoke, Massachusetts, USA". Sport in History. XXXI (3). Routledge: 283–306. doi:10.1080/17460263.2011.618697. S2CID 142019417.
- Gerson, Jeffrey; Hardy-Fanta, Carol, eds. (2014) [2002]. "Strategic Planning in the Community and the Courts: Holyoke". Latino Politics in Massachusetts: Struggles, Strategies and Prospects. Routledge. p. 99. ISBN 9781135672140.
- Gold, Catherine Dower (2001). Fifty Years of Marching Together 1952-2001: A Social History of the St. Patrick's Committee of Holyoke, Massachusetts Parade. Westhampton, Mass.: Edgar C. Alward & Jean A. Alward; Esparto Press.
- Guillet, Ernest B. (1980). French ethnic literature and culture in an American city : a study of New England French Canadian and Franco-American writings and theatrical productions with emphasis on Holyoke, Massachusetts, a major center of French life as seen in its newspapers, novels, poems, and plays between 1869 and the mid twentieth century (PhD). University of Massachusetts. OCLC 49863028.
- Haebler, Peter (1976). Habitants in Holyoke: The Development of the French-Canadian Community in a Massachusetts City, 1865 - 1910 (PhD). University of New Hampshire. OCLC 163261568.
- Hartford, William F. (1990). Working people of Holyoke : class and ethnicity in a Massachusetts mill town, 1850–1960. New Brunswick, NJ.: Rutgers University Press. ISBN 9780813515762. OCLC 21041495.
- "Holyoke, Mass.: Its Early Catholic History and Present Flourishing Condition". The Sacred Heart Review. Vol. II, no. 12 - Holyoke Edition. Boston. September 21, 1895.
- Hungate, Jesse A. (1904). The History of the First Baptist Church of Holyoke, Mass; Together with the Proceedings of the Centennial Services. Holyoke, Mass. OCLC 7478801.
- Juravich, Tom; Hartford, William F.; Green, James R. (1996). "Chapter 8: Irish Immigrants Build Holyoke". Commonwealth of Toil, Chapters in the History of Massachusetts Workers and Their Unions. Amherst, Mass.: University of Massachusetts Press. pp. 61–71. ISBN 9781558490468. OCLC 34598201.
- Kelly, Marcella R. (1973). Behind Eternity: Holyoke Women Who Made a Difference, 1873-1973. Centennial Committee of the City of Holyoke. OCLC 38305604.
- Kidder, Tracy (1989). Among Schoolchildren. New York: Houghton Mifflin. ISBN 978-0395475911.
- Lucey, P. J. (1931). History of St. Jerome's Parish, Holyoke, Massachusetts, Diocese of Springfield; issued in connection with the Observance of its Diamond Jubilee. Holyoke, Mass.: Diocese of Springfield. OCLC 42457185.
- Morgan, Myfanwy; Golden, Hilda H (Spring 1979). "Immigrant Families in an Industrial City: a Study of Households in Holyoke, 1880". Journal of Family History. 4: 59. doi:10.1177/036319907900400104. S2CID 143694444.
- Osgood, Gilbert C. (1890). Story of the Holyoke Churches. Holyoke, Mass.: Transcript Publishing Company. OCLC 08639807.
- Robinson, Ira (Fall 1991). "The Education of an American Orthodox Rabbi: Mayer Joshua Rosenberg Comes to Holyoke, Massachusetts". Judaism. XL (4). New York: 543.
- Savage, Linda E. (1967). Cohesion and disintegration in the Polish community of Ward Four, Holyoke, Massachusetts (Thesis). Mount Holyoke College. OCLC 978276107.
- Smith, Bulkeley (1962). Holyoke's Negro Families; report to the Greater Holyoke Council of Churches of a survey. Greater Holyoke Council of Churches. OCLC 22333856.
- Sosar, David P. (2015). "A Tale of Two Cities: Holyoke, Massachusetts and Hazleton, Pennsylvania" (PDF). International Journal of Education and Social Science. 2 (1). Archived from the original (PDF) on August 9, 2017.
- Ueda, Reed, ed. (2017). "Holyoke, Puerto Rican Enclaves". America's Changing Neighborhoods: An Exploration of Diversity through Places. ABC-CLIO. p. 586. ISBN 9781440828652.
- Wiesinger, Gerwart (1994). Die deutsche Einwandererkolonie von Holyoke, Massachusetts, 1865–1920 [The German Immigrant Colony of Holyoke, Massachusetts, 1865–1920] (in German). Stuttgart: F. Steiner Verlag. OCLC 31941276.

=== General history ===
- Alcorn, W. M.; Shirley, P. E. (1910). Holyoke, Past and Present Progress and Prosperity; Historical and Industrial Notes. W.M. Alcorn Souvenir Association. OCLC 50033673.
- Copeland, Alfred Minot, ed. (1902). "The City of Holyoke and the Factors in its History". "Our county and its people" : A history of Hampden County, Massachusetts. Vol. III. The Century Memorial Publishing Company. pp. 1–122. OCLC 5692695963.
- Cutter, William Richard; Crane, Ellery Bicknell; Gardner, Eugene C.; Read, Charles French; Ballard, Harland Hoge; Rantoul, Robert Samuel; Lockwood, John H.; Dyer, E. Alden (1916). Encyclopedia of Massachusetts, Biographical–Genealogical. Boston: The American Historical Society, Inc. [Despite title, primarily covers individuals with connections to Holyoke]
- DiCarlo, Ella Merkel (1982). Holyoke–Chicopee, a Perspective; 1882–1982. Transcript-Telegram Co. OCLC 9299261.
- Eliot, Samuel; Bowditch, J. Ingersoll; Appleton, William; Smith, Alfred; Sargent, Ignatius (1853). A Report of the History and Present Condition of the Hadley Falls Company at Holyoke, Massachusetts. Boston: John Wilson & Son.
- Gabriel, Ralph Henry (1936). The Founding of Holyoke: 1848. Princeton: The American Branch of the Newcomen Society of England; Princeton University Press. OCLC 707070730.
- Holland, Josiah Gilbert (1855). "Holyoke". History of western Massachusetts : the counties of Hampden, Hampshire, Franklin, and Berkshire. Vol. II. Springfield, Mass.: Samuel Bowles and Company. pp. 70–77. OCLC 865814412.
- "Holyoke". History of the Connecticut Valley in Massachusetts, with illustrations and biographical sketches of some of its prominent men and pioneers. Vol. II. Philadelphia: Louis H. Everts; Press of J.B. Lippincott and Co. 1879. pp. 915–938. OCLC 866692568.
- Holyoke, Past and Present, 1745–1895. The Transcript Publishing Co. 1895. OCLC 11107520.
- Johnson, Clifton, ed. (1936). "Holyoke, the Paper City". Hampden County, 1636-1936. Vol. II. American Historical Society. p. 667. OCLC 9479870.
- Lockwood, John H.; Bagg, Ernest Newton; Carson, Walter S.; Riley, Herbert E.; Boltwood, Edward; Clark, Will L., eds. (1926). "Chapter V: The City and Town of Holyoke". Western Massachusetts, A History 1636–1925. Vol. II. New York & Chicago: Lewis Historical Publishing, Inc. OCLC 988211712.
- Warner, Charles F.; Johnson, Clifton, eds. (1891). Picturesque Hampden. Picturesque Massachusetts Series. Vol. Part II - West. Northampton, Mass.: Picturesque Publishing Company. pp. 1–152. OCLC 70679168.

==== Academic case studies ====
- Bull, Marijoan; Burns, Patrick; Kolensky, Mathieu; Orellana, Michael; Sabetti, Daniel; Spier, Brien; Thornton, Jack; Walters, Erin (May 2016). Research for Learning in Place (PDF) (Report). Westfield State University. Archived from the original (PDF) on 2018-08-20.
- Green, Constance McLaughlin (1939). Holyoke, Massachusetts; a case history of the industrial revolution in America. Yale Historical Publications. New Haven: Yale University Press.
- Green, Constance McLaughlin (1957). "New England Manufacturing Cities: Holyoke and Naugatuck". American Cities in the Growth of the Nation. New York: J. De Graff. pp. 79–99. OCLC 786169259.
- Haeber, Jonathan (May 2013). From Main to High: Consumers, Class, and the Spatial Reorientation of an Industrial City (MA). University of Massachusetts Amherst. Archived from the original on March 23, 2017.
- Kegelman, Thomas P. (September 1991). Changing Patterns of Residential Rental Property Investment in Holyoke, Massachusetts (Master of City Planning). Massachusetts Institute of Technology (MIT). Archived from the original on 2018-12-24.
- Underwood, Kenneth Wilson (1957). Protestant and Catholic: Religious And Social Interaction In An Industrial Community. Beacon Hill, Boston: The Beacon Press. OCLC 1021289508.

==== Anniversarial histories ====
- Allyn, George H. (1912). Thirtieth Anniversary Sketch, Holyoke Daily Transcript, 1882–1912. The Transcript Publishing Co. OCLC 24571746.
- Conant, Howard; Harper, Wyatt E. (1948). Complete program of Holyoke's seventy-fifth anniversary and home coming days : with a history of the city. OCLC 9694660.
- Harper, Wyatt E. (1973). The Story of Holyoke. Centennial Committee of the City of Holyoke. OCLC 8060402.
- Holyoke, Massachusetts Centennial Souvenir Program. Centennial Committee of the City of Holyoke. 1973. OCLC 49709901.
- Holyoke, Old and New. Holyoke: Dillon Printing and Publishing. 1923. OCLC 49709987.

==== Periodical articles ====
- "The New City at Hadley Falls". Hampshire Gazette. Northampton, Mass. July 31, 1849. p. 2.
- "Dam at Hadley Falls". Gleason's Pictorial Drawing-Room Companion. I (14). Boston: Frederick Gleason: 212. July 31, 1869.
- Johnson, Fanny M. (October 1885). "A Model Industrial City". The Bay State Monthly. III (V): 328–340.
- "Holyoke, Mass" (PDF). La Presse (in French). Vol. XIII, no. 98. Montreal. 27 February 1897. p. 1.
- Kirtland, Edwin L. (February 1898). "The City of Holyoke". The New England Magazine. XVII (6): 715–737.
- Quigley, Frank (December 1903). "Progressive American Cities: Holyoke, the Paper Metropolis". National Magazine. Vol. XIX, no. 3. Boston: Chapple Publishing Company, Ltd.
- "South Hadley Falls Dam, Massachusetts". Harper's Weekly. XIII (657). New York: Harper Brothers: 493–494. October 4, 1851.
- "The People of Holyoke; Great Proportion of Them Foreigners; What is Being Done for Their Americanization—Forces of Law, Education and Example". New-York Tribune. New York. November 9, 1902. p. 14 – via Chronicling America, Library of Congress.
- Zuber, Ernest (1 January 1877). "La Cité de Holyoke; ses trauvaux hydrauliques et ses industries". Le Moniteur de la Papeterie Française. La Papeterie en Amérique (2^{e} article) (in French). Paris. pp. 201–204.

=== Law and government ===
- City of Holyoke (November 20, 2018). "Charter and Code of Ordinances, City of Holyoke, Massachusetts". Municode Library.
- City of Holyoke. "Minutes and Agendas, City Council". Internav.

== Fiction ==
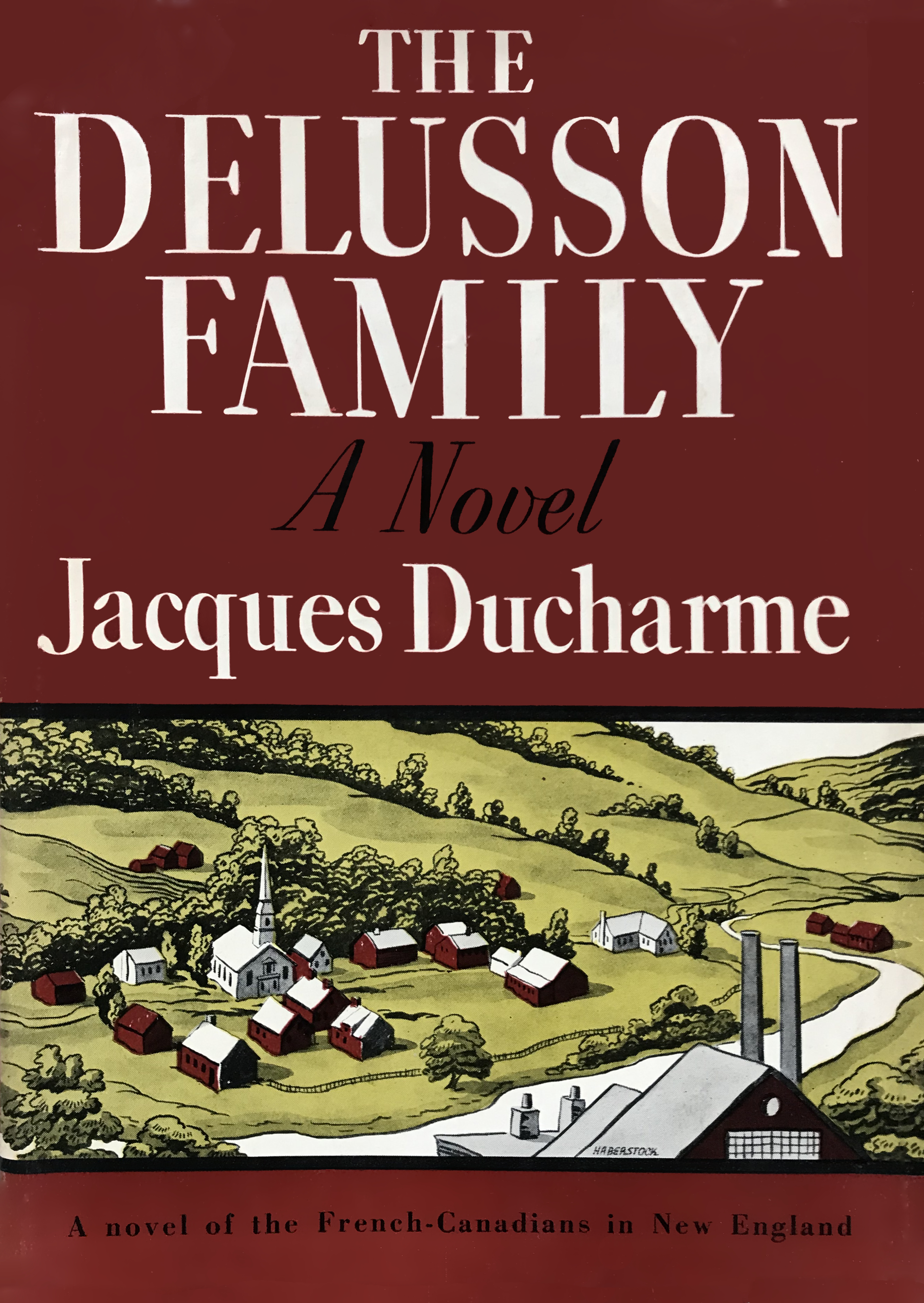
First edition cover of The Delusson Family by Jacques Ducharme

- Curran, Mary Doyle (2002) [1948]. The Parish and the Hill. New York: Feminist Press at the City University of New York. OCLC 1025481370.
- Ducharme, Jacques (1939). The Delusson Family. New York and London: Funk & Wagnalls Company.
- Dumas, Emma (1979) [1910]. Mirbah (in French). Bedford, N.H.: National Development Center for French [original in La Justice]. OCLC 7913042.
- Hébert, François [in French] (1978). Holyoke (in French). Montréal: Les Editions Quinze. ISBN 0885651812. OCLC 06144416.
- Kennedy, Raymond (1981). Columbine. New York: Penguin Books. OCLC 7178543.
- Stansberry, Domenic [in French] (2015) [1987]. The Spoiler. Open Road Media. OCLC 907942521.

== See also ==
- Good Housekeeping, originally established in Holyoke
- Holyoke Transcript-Telegram, the city's defunct newspaper of record
- The Nautilus, New Thought periodical published in Holyoke
- Bibliography of Boston
- History of papermaking in Massachusetts
