= Capital Beat =

Capital Beat may refer to

- The Concord Monitor newspaper column by Eric Moskowitz and Sarah Liebowitz
- A fictional political television show in The West Wing hosted by Mark Gottfried
