= Mike Pride =

Mike Pride may refer to:

- Mike Pride (writer) (1946–2023), American author, journalist, and historian
- Mike Pride (musician), American musician and composer
