= James M. Langley =

American newspaper editor and diplomat

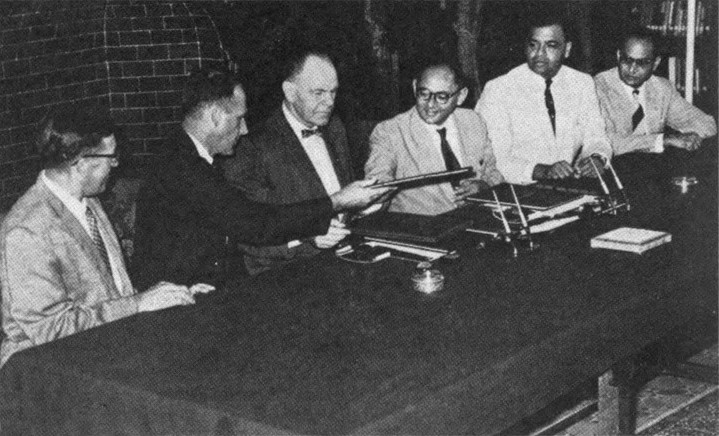
Exchange of the instruments of ratification for the Pakistan–United States Double Taxation Convention in Karachi, 21 May 1959. From left: Commercial Attaché Hubert M. Curry, Counsellor for Economic Affairs Thomas C.M. Robinson, Ambassador Langley, Foreign Minister Manzur Qadir, Chief of Protocol Maqbool Rabb, and Joint Secretary Quamrul Islam.

James McLellan Langley (October 11, 1894 – June 23, 1968) was an American newspaper editor and diplomat.

Born in Hyde Park, Boston, to Frank Elmer Langley and Mary Bradford McLellan, James M. Langley was raised in Vermont, where his father, who later served as mayor of Barre and state senator, had founded the Barre Times in 1894. The younger Langley attended Dartmouth College. His college career was broken up by World War I, during which he trained at a Plattsburgh camp, before moving to the Fort Devens-Sudbury Training Annex. After his graduation and discharge from the Army, Langley worked for the Manchester Union Leader. In 1923, Langley secured a loan from his father and John G. Winant. He used to money to buy, then merge, the Concord Monitor with The New Hampshire Patriot. Langley sold the Monitor in 1961 to the publishers of the Holyoke Transcript-Telegram, but continued serving as editor of the publication until his death.

Langley served on multiple municipal and state conventions, authoring many New Hampshire laws tackling minimum wage, unemployment, zoning, licensing, and tax codes. He helped negotiate the Laurel–Langley Agreement with the Philippines, signed in 1955. Langley was appointed the ambassador to Pakistan in 1957, and served for two years. He died in Concord, New Hampshire, on June 23, 1968, aged 73.

Diplomatic posts
Preceded by Horace A. Hildreth	United States Ambassador to Pakistan; 1957–1959	Succeeded by William M. Rountree
