= CTNow =

Newspaper published in Hartford, Connecticut

CTNOW
- Company type: Private
- Founded: 1973
- Headquarters: 121 Wawarme Avenue, Hartford, Connecticut, United States
- Area served: Connecticut
- Products: Alternative weekly
- Parent: Hartford Courant
- Website: ctnow.com

CTNow is a free weekly newspaper in central and southwestern Connecticut, United States, published by the Hartford Courant.

The previous iteration of CTNow was New Mass. Media, a privately owned weekly newspaper company until 1999, when its owners, including founding publisher Geoffrey Robinson, sold the company to The Hartford Courant for an undisclosed sum. A year later, Courant parent company Times-Mirror was bought by the Tribune Company, based in Chicago. In 2013, the Hartford Advocate, New Haven Advocate, and Fairfield County Weekly were merged with the Courant's calendar section and website CTNow to create the weekly paper CTNow.

== History ==
The company was founded in 1973 by Geoffrey Robinson and Edward Matys, then copy editors at The Hartford Courant. Robinson, a native of New Haven, Connecticut, worked as wire service editor of the daily Lorain Journal of Ohio after his graduation from Yale University in 1971. Matys had worked in editorial positions at several Massachusetts and Connecticut newspapers.

The pair began publishing the Valley Advocate, a bi-weekly serving Western Massachusetts, in September 1973 from small basement offices in Amherst, Massachusetts. In September 1974, the Valley Advocate began publishing weekly; Robinson and Matys opened offices in Hartford and started publication of the Hartford Advocate. A year later, in September 1975, the pair began publishing the weekly New Haven Advocate and in 1978 started publication of the Fairfield County Advocate (subsequently renamed Fairfield County Weekly to avoid confusion with the neighboring and unrelated Stamford Advocate).

In 1999, the four-paper chain was sold to Times-Mirror, which was itself acquired by Tribune in 2000. Tribune announced in December 2007 that it would sell the Valley Advocate, its only Massachusetts publication, to Newspapers of New England.

== Former properties ==
Advocate weeklies offered investigative journalism, national, state and local political coverage, commentary, and arts features and criticism, mostly from a liberal or countercultural point of view. They shared some editorial content, but each had regionally focused news and opinion pieces, restaurant reviews, event listings, and advertisements. The newspapers had annual "Best Of" write-in contests, and subsequent issues that featured the winning businesses.

The Advocates accepted a wider variety of advertisements than mainstream newspapers, including ads for strip clubs, erotic massage services, adult book and video stores, and the like, which columnists and readers argued conflict with the newspapers' avowed feminism.

=== Fairfield County Weekly ===
The Fairfield County Weekly was distributed throughout Fairfield County. Its average weekly circulation was 26,708 in 2011.

=== Hartford Advocate ===
Hartford Advocate

The Hartford Advocate was published in Hartford, Connecticut and had a circulation of 37,779 in 2011.

The Hartford Advocate was founded in 1974 by Geoffrey Robinson and Edward Matys to fill a void in investigative and beat reporting in the capital city of Connecticut. For example, The Hartford Courant, where Robinson and Matys had previously worked, did not routinely cover one of the city's largest industries, insurance. The founding editors included managing editor Dick Polman, recruited from the New London Day, and city editor Bruce Kauffman, from the Courant where as a police and general assignment reporter he discovered that a heavily traveled bridge around the corner from the state capitol was being held up by a telephone pole.

Gail Collins reported on state government and politics; she is now an op-ed columnist at The New York Times. Another early reporter was David Lieberman, who was later an editorial writer for the Courant and covered the media business for USA Today.

Polman left the Advocate after some five years to become a columnist at the Courant and later joined The Philadelphia Inquirer as national political correspondent. He also taught at the University of Pennsylvania. Kauffman later worked for CNN, taught at Emerson College in Boston, Morehouse College in Atlanta and the University of Wisconsin–Madison. He also worked for the North County Times, one of two daily newspapers in San Diego County, California.

In a history of the alternative media, A Trumpet to Arms, author David Armstrong described the Advocate as a bastion for the "new muckrakers." The author explored the paper's examination of the behind-the-scenes power exercised by the corporate elite in Hartford. Kauffman had reported that top banks and insurance companies, including Travelers, were funneling the bulk of city pension fund money into companies that propped up the apartheid regime in South Africa. The city of Hartford would end up divesting the South Africa–related investments.

Polman notes, in the acknowledgements for "Dateline: Connecticut," "I had originally hoped to thank the publishers of the Hartford Advocate for allowing me to reprint some of my 'Subject to Change' columns, but they denied me access to my work, citing my 'gravitation' to the Courant."

In the 1980s and '90s the paper included a full-time photographer, Nicholas Lacy, and an array of colorful editors and reporters, including Ric Hornung (who was known to eavesdrop on City Hall denizens by hiding in the lunch truck and taking notes on their conversations), Janet Reynolds (who later became publisher), Jayne Keedle, Susan White Patrick (ESPN Sports Center star Dan Patrick's wife), Leslie Riva, and Edward Ericson, Jr. The paper's reporting on city hall corruption in the early 1990s led to the City Manager's ouster and several criminal convictions. Later stories about High Sheriff Al Rioux helped lead to his conviction on federal wire and mail fraud charges and the abolition of the county sheriffs' offices statewide in 2000.

=== Valley Advocate ===
Advocate Weekly Newspapers formerly published the Valley Advocate, a similar alternative weekly, in Easthampton, Massachusetts, covering the greater Springfield area and the Pioneer Valley of Western Massachusetts. It began as an independent newspaper in 1973 and was sold in late 2007 to Newspapers of New England, parent of its competitor the Daily Hampshire Gazette of Northampton, Massachusetts.
