= Athol Daily News =

- Type: Daily newspaper
- Format: Broadsheet
- Owner(s): Newspapers of New England, Inc.
- Publisher: Shawn Palmer
- Editor: Dan Crowley
- Headquarters: 14 Hope Street, Suite 101 Greenfield, Massachusetts 01301 United States
- Circulation: 984
- Price: USD .75
- Website: atholdailynews.com

The Athol Daily News is a six-day daily (Monday through Saturday) newspaper in north central Massachusetts. The newspaper covers the towns of Athol, Erving, New Salem, Orange, Petersham, Phillipston, Royalston, Warwick, and Wendell, Massachusetts.

== History ==
There have been five owners in the history of the Athol Daily News, with three representing generations of the same family.

The Athol Daily News was founded in 1934 when Lincoln O'Brien merged two weeklies, the Athol Chronicle and Athol Transcript. O'Brien sold the paper to Edward T. Fairchild in 1940. On January 1, 1982, Richard J. Chase Sr. bought the newspaper from Fairchild, his father-in-law. The Boston Globe reported at the time that the Daily News' circulation was 5,500.

Richard J. Chase Jr., Fairchild's grandson, took over Athol Press Inc. September 29, 1989. Circulation of the family-owned newspaper at that time was given as 5,700.

On December 20, 2017, it was publicly announced that Newspapers of New England (NNE) had purchased the paper for an undisclosed amount.
