= Holyoke Transcript-Telegram =

Newspaper in Holyoke, Massachusetts, US

- A 1986 daily issue of the Transcript-Telegram
- Type: Daily newspaper
- Format: Broadsheet
- Owner: Newspapers of New England
- Publisher: Murray D. Schwartz
- Founded: September 1, 1849; 176 years ago (as Hampden Freeman)
- Ceased publication: January 21, 1993; 33 years ago
- Headquarters: 120 Whiting Farms Road, Holyoke, Massachusetts 01040 United States
- Circulation: 16,300 daily in 1993
- OCLC number: 20551327

The Holyoke Transcript-Telegram, or T‑T, was an afternoon daily newspaper covering the city of Holyoke, Massachusetts, United States, and adjacent portions of Hampden County and Hampshire County.

Published as a daily since 1882, after four years of heavy losses the newspaper ceased publication in January 1993; at the time it was one of the longest running Massachusetts papers to fold, two decades longer than the Boston Post. Long owned by the Dwight family, the T-T's last owner was Newspapers of New England, which had been founded by the Dwights as a holding company for the T-T and other newspapers it had acquired.

With the departure of the T-T, Holyoke lost its only newspaper of record. Daily newspaper readers in the city turned to newspapers in nearby cities, which increased their coverage of Holyoke: the Union-News of Springfield, now called The Republican; and the Daily Hampshire Gazette of Northampton.

== History ==
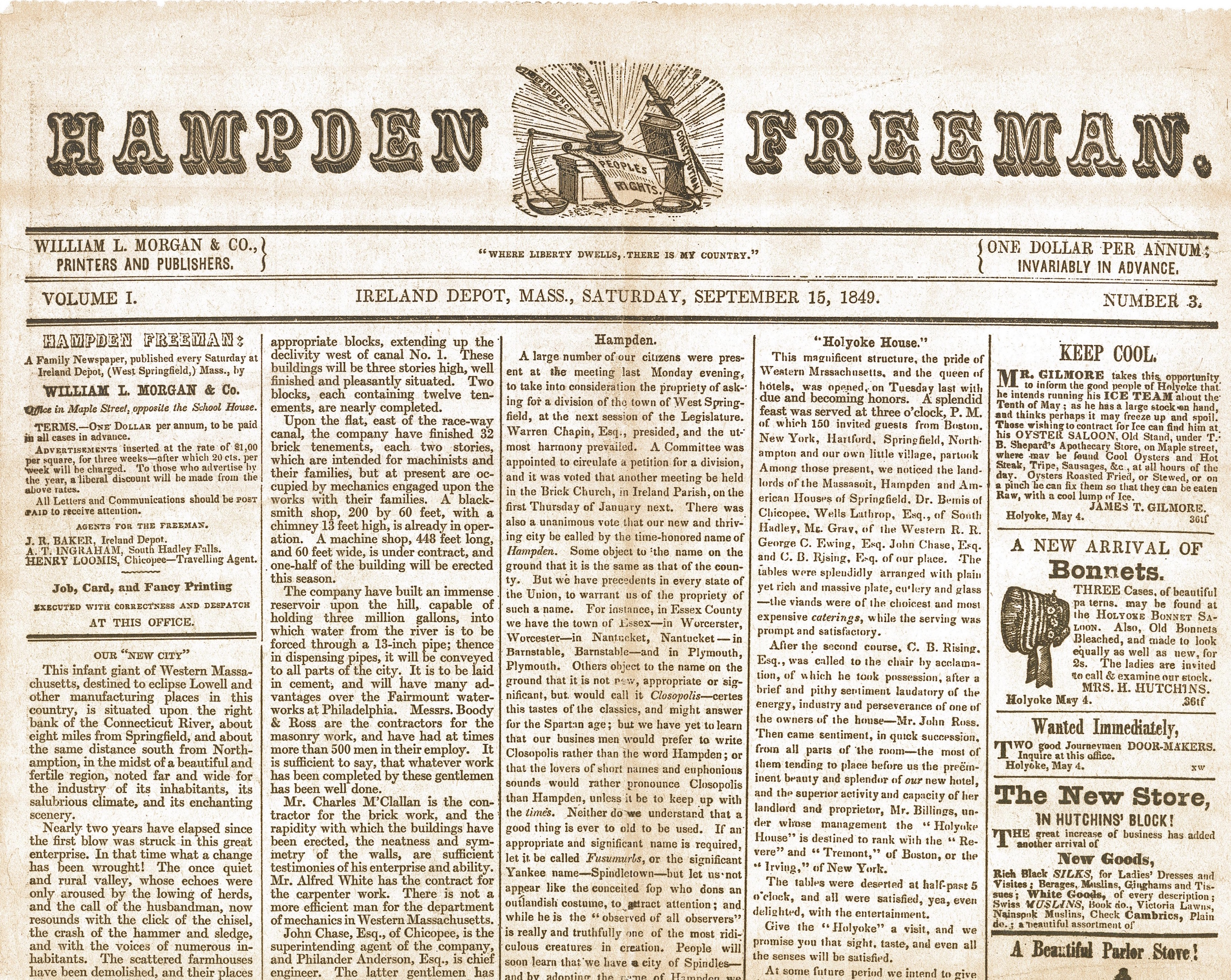
Early issue of the Hampden Freeman, c. 1849

=== Abolitionist origins ===
Founded as the Hampden Freeman, the debut issue of Holyoke's first newspaper was printed by proprietor William L. Morgan on September 1, 1849, when the locale was still known as Ireland Depot. The first editor of the then-weekly paper, a young lawyer named William B. C. Pearsons, would go on to serve as the city's first mayor a quarter century later, and in his earliest editorials would describe the New City project of the Associates as the "infant giant of Western Massachusetts, destined to eclipse Lowell". Identified by its name, the paper was staunchly abolitionist, with its views explained with brevity in an editorial on March 23, 1850—

"To our Whig friends we offer our kindest wishes and zealous support, and we shall sustain, as well as we may, the principles of the great and national Whig party. We are opposed to the extension of slavery into the new territories, and we are as much opposed to the policy of certain leaders at the north who style themselves the Free Soil Party...As men, we extend the hand of friendship to our Democratic readers (and we have a very large number), and wish them all success in private and personal enterprises, but as partisans, we throw the gauntlet in their midst, and in our strength defy them." (Note: The aforementioned support to the "principles of the great and national Whig party" reflected the upcoming schism that would arise in the party, in which a divide over the issue of admitting states to the union with slavery would lead to the party's dissolution, and incorporation of many former Whigs such as Pearsons into the Republican Party. The Free Soil Party referenced as well, though antislavery, was derided by Boston abolitionist William Lloyd Garrison as "white manism", as it distanced itself from abolitionism and avoided the moral problems implicit in slavery. Instead emphasis was placed on the threat slavery posed to white labor and Northern businessmen in the new West.)

On January 15, 1853, the paper would be rechristened the Holyoke Freeman with Azro B. F. Hildreth assuming the editorship. This name would prove short-lived and by January 7, 1854 following some period of intermittent publication, the paper was again renamed the Holyoke Weekly Mirror, changing hands under the proprietorship of Lilley & Pratt, and leaving its Whig allegiance, in favor of a stated non-partisanship. Within the decade, the paper's ownership would again change to Wheelock & Pratt, with Myron C. Pratt as the eventual sole proprietor by 1858.

=== Expansion as daily ===
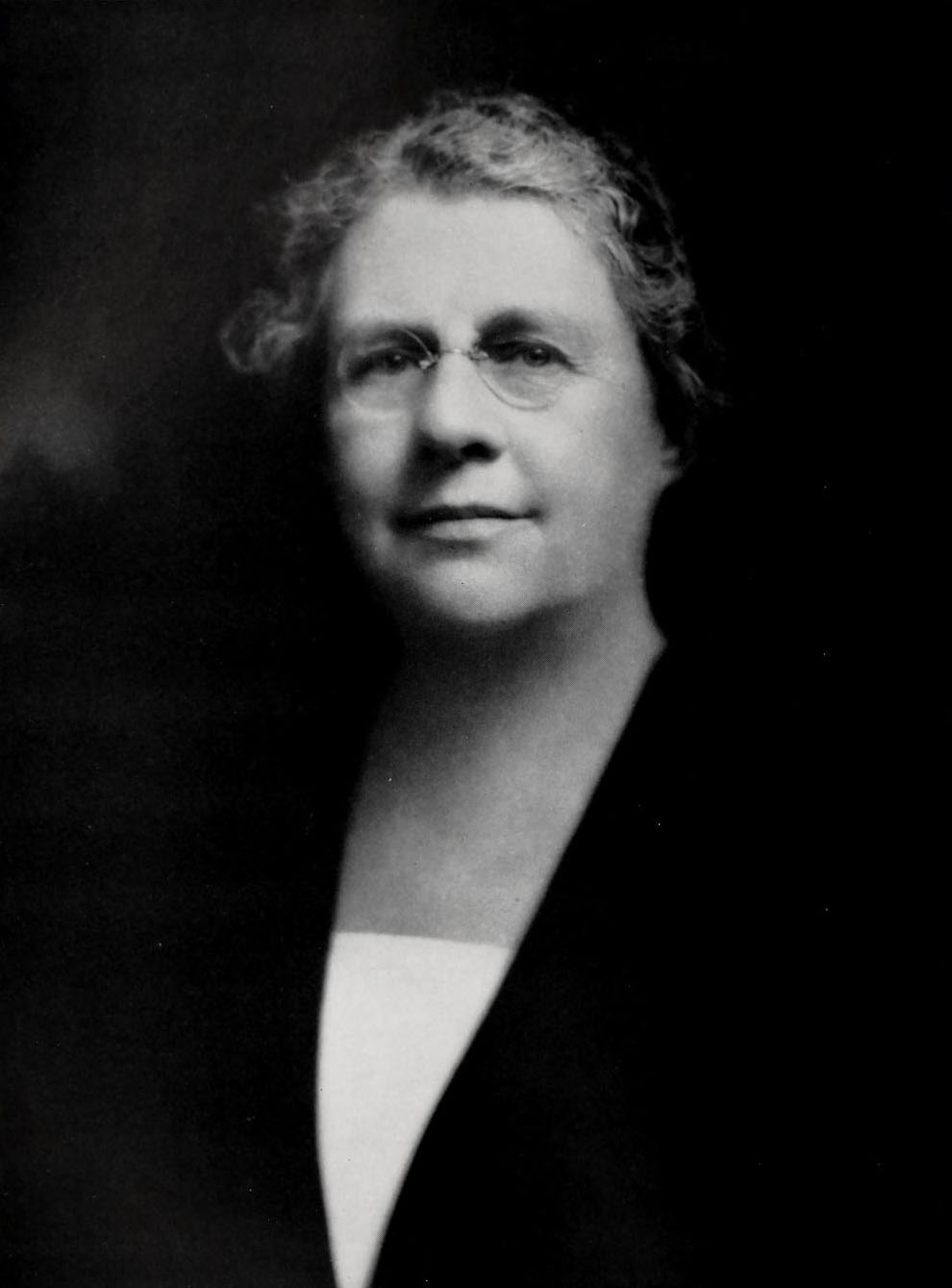
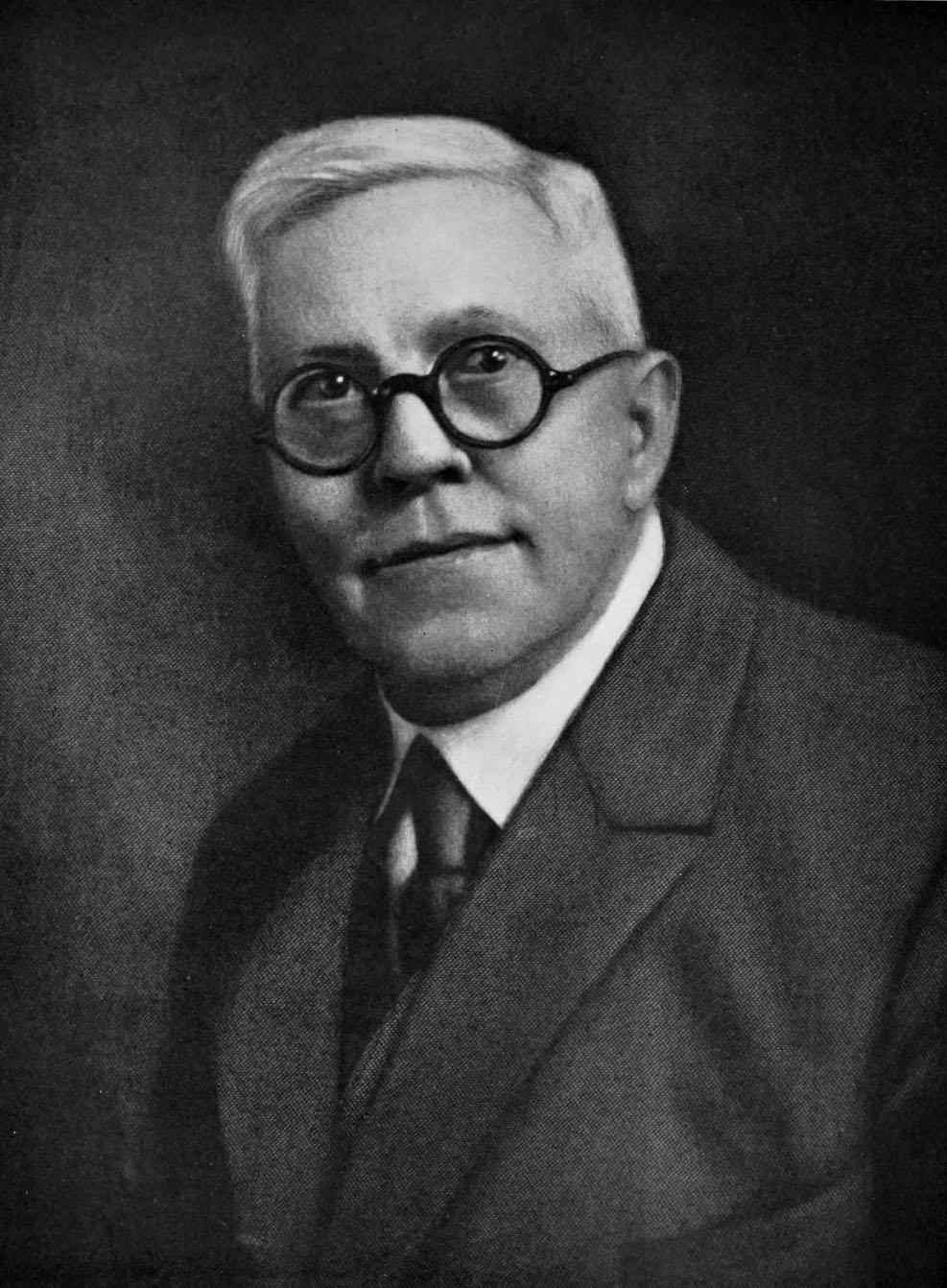
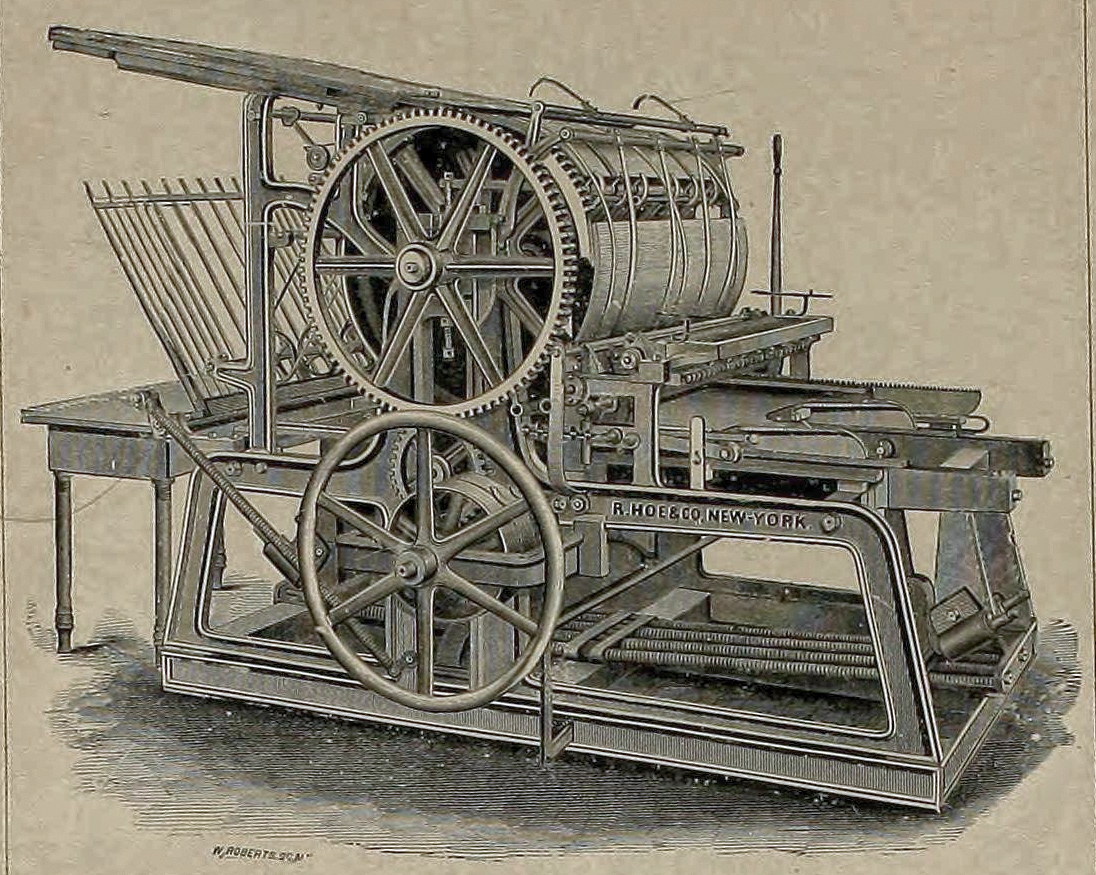
Editor-publishers, Minnie Dwight (left), first woman to receive an honorary degree from UMass, who succeeded her husband, William Dwight Sr (right) in 1930; the original press used by the paper when it first became a daily in 1882

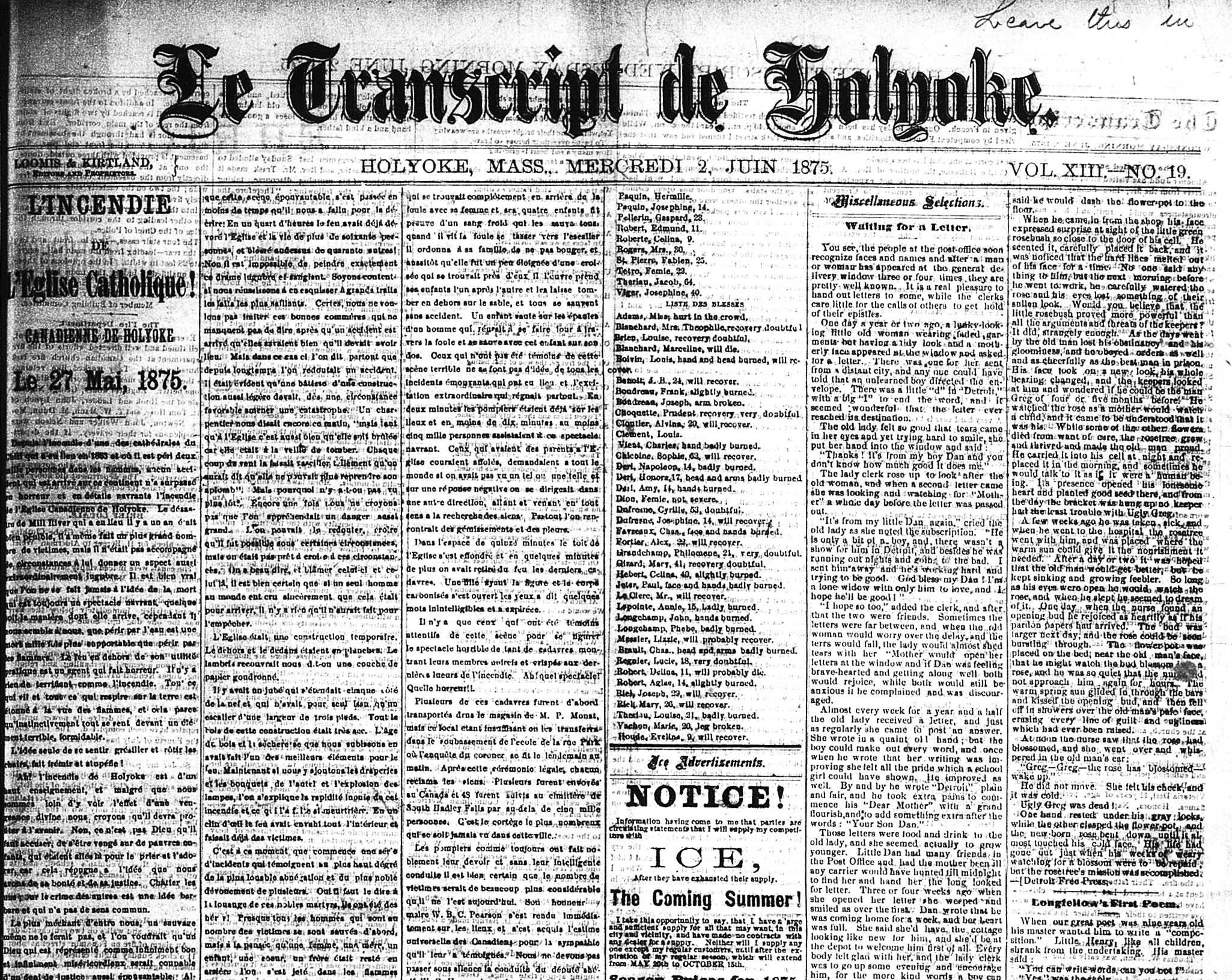
Le Transcript de Holyoke, the sole time the paper published in French while covering the tragedy of the Precious Blood Church fire in 1875

The Holyoke Transcript first published under that name on April 11, 1863, with the ownership of Henry M. Burt and Charles M. Lyman (Burt & Lyman). By 1870 Burt's partnership had been assumed by Edwin L. Kirtland, and by 1872 Lyman had sold his share to William S. Loomis. In 1881, one William G. Dwight, having just graduated from Amherst College, joined the paper's staff; within a year's time he would assume the shares of Kirtland.

Initially a weekly, the story of the daily T-T as it was known in the 20th century began in many ways with William G. Dwight, who oversaw the transfer to daily publishing which began on October 9, 1882. Loomis and Dwight would oversee the conversion of the weekly, by then called the Holyoke Transcript, into a daily but it was Dwight who would stay with the publication for 4 more decades after Loomis sold his shares in 1888 to pursue expansion of the Holyoke Street Railway. By 1926 Dwight completed acquisition of the rival Holyoke Telegram daily, lending the combined newspaper the name it would keep until 1993.

Dwight died in 1930, and his wife, Minnie Dwight, became publisher. Their son, also named William Dwight, was named managing editor but he also explored other investments. He founded WHYN radio with Charles DeRose, owner of the Daily Hampshire Gazette. The two also founded WHYN-TV, the Springfield area's second television station, in 1953. They sold the WHYN properties in 1967.

Another of William Dwight's purchases would have a profound impact on the T-T's future. In 1955 he bought and became co-publisher of the Greenfield Recorder-Gazette. His later purchases of the Concord Monitor and Valley News in New Hampshire would lead to the establishment of Newspapers of New England, the company that eventually decided to close the T-T.

"[I]t was clear to us that among real Holyokians the word Transcript and the word newspaper are used synonymously."
—David J. Malcolm, reporter for the Springfield Republican, December 22, 1940

Following Minnie's death in 1957, her son William became publisher of the T-T, a title he held until his son, William Jr., took the reins in 1975. William Sr. stayed on as chairman of the board until 1982, succeeded in that capacity by his son Donald R. Dwight.

=== International impact ===
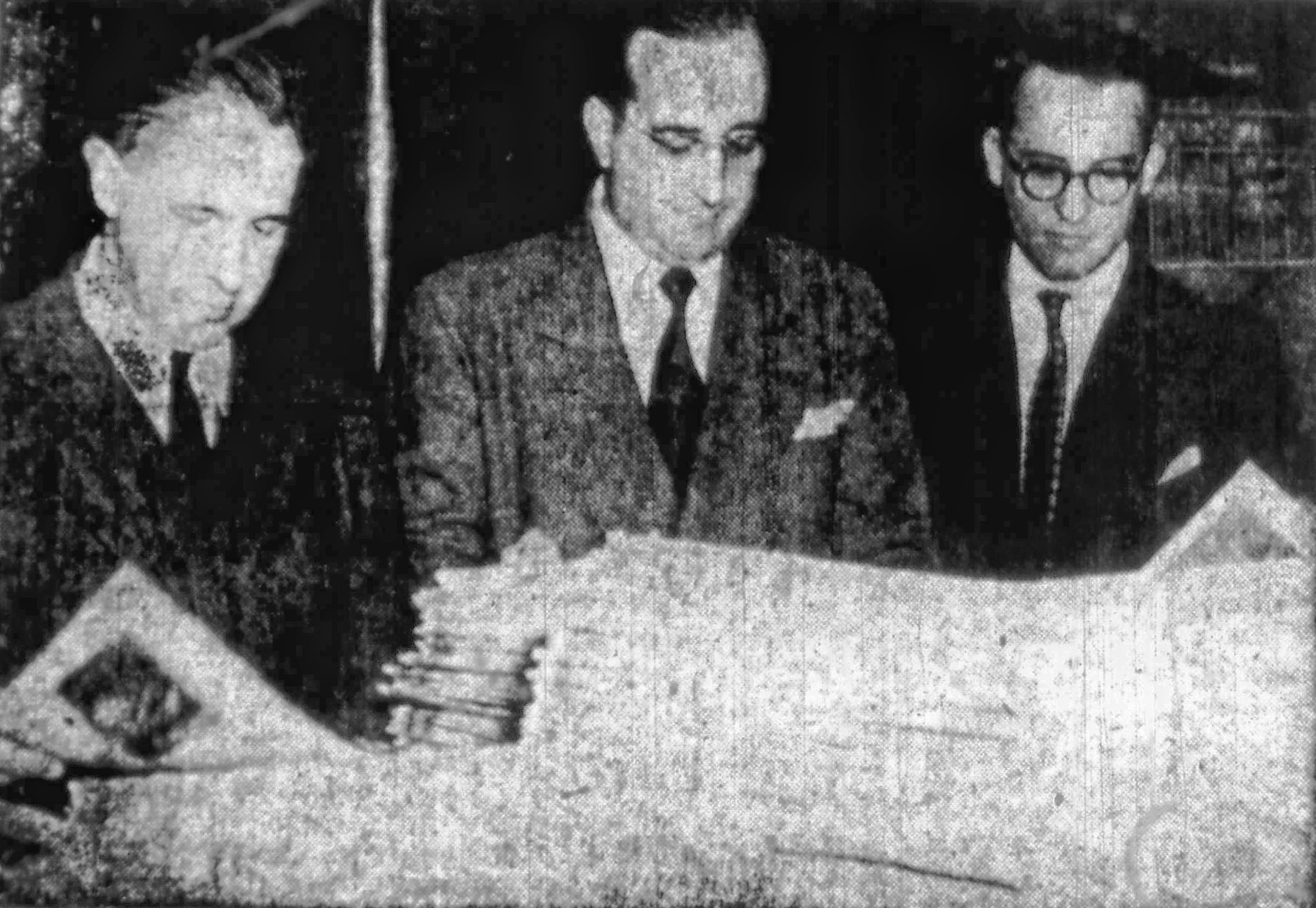
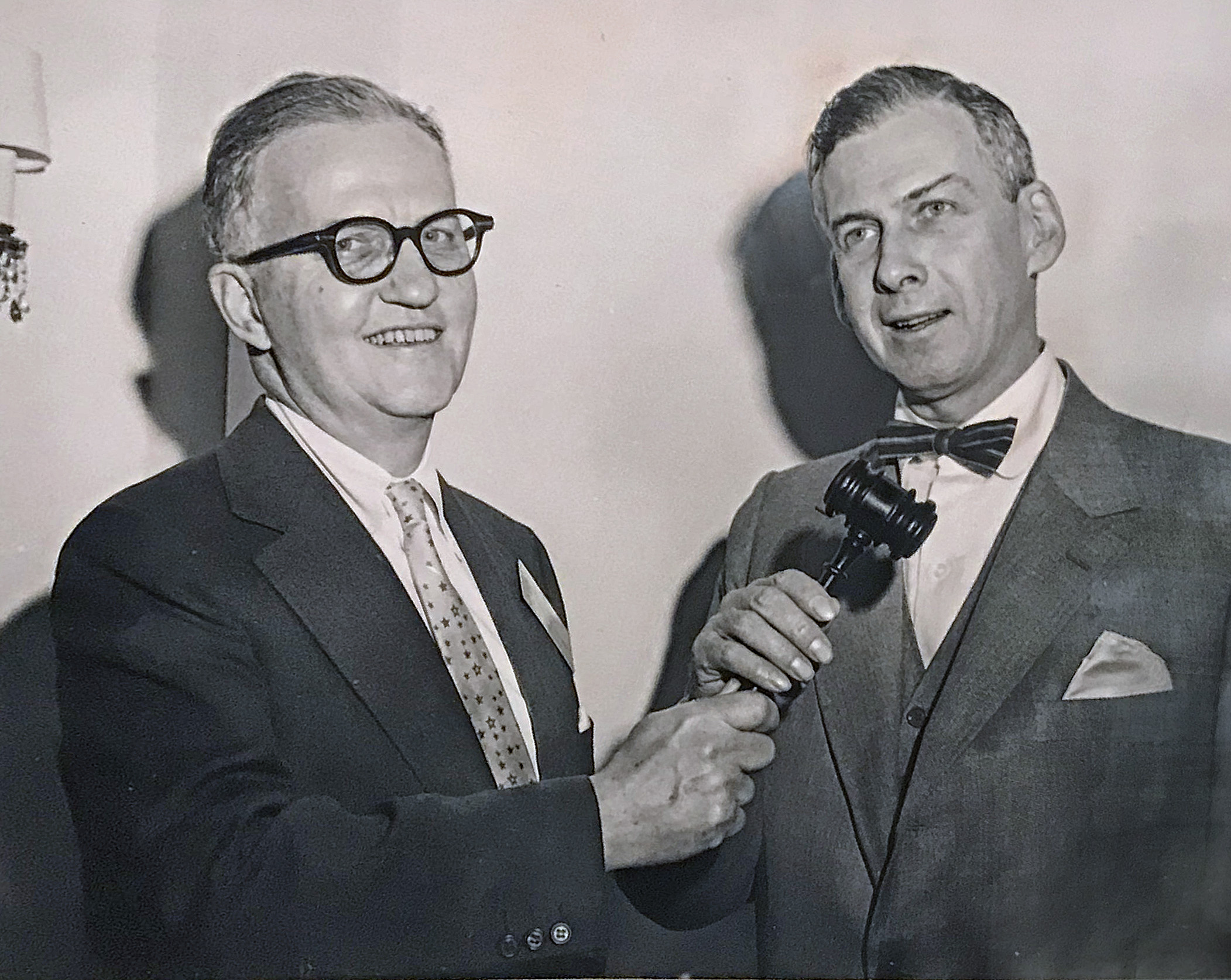
Top to bottom: Álvaro Alsogaray (left), representing Fibrocel S.A., reviews the world's first run of bagasse newsprint used to print the Transcript, January 26, 1950, with Argentine UN delegate César Augusto Bunge (right); William Dwight Jr., as president of the American Newspaper Publishers Association, passes the gavel to his successor, D. Tennant Bryan of the Richmond Times-Dispatch, at the close of the Association's 72nd annual convention, April 1958

During the time that he was the Transcript-Telegram's publisher, William Dwight Jr. would give the paper a platform on the international stage. In 1950, the New York Times would report that representatives from Argentina, Puerto Rico, Brazil, Peru, Colombia, Mexico, Cuba, the Dominican Republic, Haiti, Australia, India, Pakistan, China, South Africa, and the United Kingdom met in Holyoke to see the first newsprint papers commercially made from bagasse, produced by the Chemical Paper Company, and used as paper stock in a special edition of the Transcript-Telegram.

Before the end of the decade, Dwight presided over a number of national affiliates, including as a director and vice chairman of the Associated Press, and chairman of the Newspaper Advertising Bureau. Indeed for a time Dwight would be instrumental in the national discourse of American foreign news coverage. On April 26, 1956 Dwight assumed the post of president of the American Newspaper Publishers Association, which he held until 1958. As president of that publishing organization, Dwight would publicly challenge the policy of the President Eisenhower's Secretary of State John Foster Dulles, who had barred American journalists from covering events inside Communist China. Working with counterparts of other news organizations to rally against the State Department's policies, on February 6, 1957, Dwight would publish an open telegram to Eisenhower and Vice President Nixon, later reprinted in Congressional testimony, positing four principles that the organization saw as key to American journalism:

1. Newspaper or magazine writers who are American citizens and employed by American publications and newsgathering services to gather and write news or express opinion on facts should be accorded by our Government freedom to travel for that purpose in any country in the world with which the United States is not at war.
2. Passports issued to American citizens who are engaged in gathering and writing news or expressing opinion for American publications should not be restricted so as to ban travel in any country with which this Nation is not at war.
3. Penalties of fine or imprisonment or revocation of the right to travel should not be imposed upon American newspaper or magazine writers, who, at their own risk, choose to pursue their profession in any country in the world with which this Nation is not a[t] war.
4. We respectfully recommend consideration by the President and the Congress of the foregoing principles in connection with the visit of American writers to Red China for the purpose of gather and reporting facts for the information of the American people.

With the administration unwavering in its policy, Dwight would continue to work with his contemporaries at the Associated Press and other journalistic bodies to pressure the Secretary of State. In a widely-quoted April 1957 speech he would go on to say "[a]rguments based on the evils of the Peiping [Beijing] Regime have been advanced to bolster the decision to keep us from finding out for ourselves what is taking place over there. They should not prevail over the majestic principle of the people's right to know, a precious right inherent in our way of life". Though their success would be limited, and the Transcript-Telegram itself would not send journalists to China, Dwight's work would prove influential in the discontinuation of this policy.

== Decline and closure ==
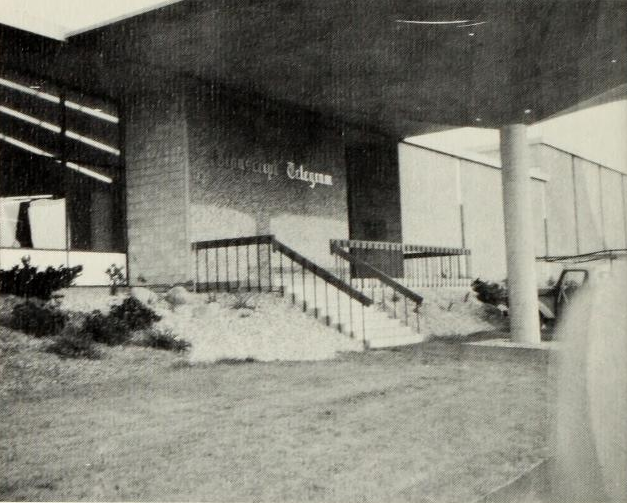
The last headquarters of the paper at 120 Whiting Farms Road

William Dwight, Jr., stayed on as publisher only until 1981, when the company board, made up largely of his family including brother-in-law George W. Wilson, fired him. William Jr. later blamed his out-of-towner replacements for the newspaper's decline, according to CommonWealth magazine:

The new crew had grand journalistic visions, and forgot the Transcript's local roots, residents say. The publisher sent one reporter to China, another to Poland to cover the labor Solidarity movement. "They saw it as a more metropolitan type daily, a more sophisticated newspaper", said William Dwight, Jr., ... "The result is they added enormous expense to the newspaper and it was not covered by the income."

In 1988 the T-T was named "best newspaper in New England" by the New England Newspaper Publishers Association, but in the years 1988 to 1992 the newspaper was said to have lost $1 million as advertising and circulation declined. Some observers blamed competition with the Union-News of Springfield (which would later publish a "Holyoke Union-News" edition) or Holyoke's substantial and growing immigrant population, which diluted the market for an English-language newspaper. In a newspaper interview, the T-T's then-publisher blamed economics:

"You're wrestling with a market that has decreased substantially over the last two decades", said Murray D. Schwartz, publisher of the Transcript-Telegram. "It has really lost its downtown core. It's really a traditional story of what has happened to American cities."

Out of 69 workers at the newspaper on the day it closed, the company laid off 36. The remainder took jobs at four weekly newspapers, published at the Transcript-Telegram building, intended to take the daily's place.

Microfilm copies of the Holyoke Transcript-Telegram can be found at the Holyoke History Room of the Holyoke Public Library as well as Mount Holyoke College.

== Weeklies ==
Immediately after the daily newspaper's demise, Newspapers of New England reopened the T-T as a group of four free-circulation, tabloid-format weekly newspapers—a weekly Transcript-Telegram in Holyoke, and In South Hadley-Granby, In Chicopee and In Westfield, covering four of the largest cities and towns in the old daily T-T circulation area. The Chicopee and Westfield weeklies had actually been established about a year prior to the daily's demise.

The free tabloids immediately proved unprofitable, however, and the company pulled the plug on the experiment only three months later. The Holyoke Transcript-Telegram published its final edition April 23, 1993.

With the weekly T-T gone, Holyoke was in "a virtual news blackout", according to journalist Carolyn Ryan, "with only a gossip sheet called Hello, Holyoke remaining for local media". Indeed, it is true that Hello, Holyoke's coverage was almost exclusively local news and opinion, with no reporting of world or national news or sports or financial coverage. That vacuum went unfilled until two years later, when Justin Prisendorf established the Holyoke Sun.

The Sun proved to have staying power and continues to publish today. Hello, Holyoke ceased publication in 2006. Since 2001 the 10,000-circulation Sun has been owned by Turley Publications.
