= Preston Gannaway =

American photojournalist

- Born: North Carolina
- Occupation: Photographer

Preston Gannaway, an American photojournalist, won the Pulitzer Prize for Feature Photography in 2008.

== Biography and career ==
Gannaway, a native of North Carolina, grew up in an artistic family. Both her mother and her great-grandmother were artists. Halfway through college she decided she wanted to make the leap from drawing and painting to photography. In 2000, Gannaway graduated from Virginia Intermont College with a bachelor's degree in fine art photography. Her first job after college was at the 8,000 circulation Coalfield Progress, a twice-a-week newspaper in rural southwest Virginia. In 2003 she started work at the Concord Monitor in New Hampshire. In 2008 she joined the staff of the Rocky Mountain News and later went on to The Virginian-Pilot.

She lives in the San Francisco Bay area with her partner Nicole Frugé. Since 2013 Gannaway has worked as an independent photographer.

== Awards ==
Gannaway earned Pulitzer Prize for Feature Photography in 2008 for her project "Remember Me." The citation called it an "intimate chronicle of a family coping with a parent's terminal illness." Gannaway and reporter Chelsea Conaboy spent two years with the family of Carolynne and Rich St. Pierre as Carolynne fought against cancer and ultimately died. The two journalists continued the story after her death to show St. Pierre's family struggle to deal with her loss. Rich St. Pierre referred to Gannaway and Conaboy as "gentle observers of our most private moments." Gannaway told Popular Photography, "Often people don't realize that that's the darkest time for a family with someone so sick -- when the house gets quiet and other friends and community members get back to their lives. After the loved one has passed, the needs are just as great. We wanted to show what that part of life was like for Rich and the kids."

Gannaway was a 2014 finalist for the Getty Images and Chris Hondros fund. Gannaway’s work has also been honored in Pictures of the Year International, NPPA’s Best of Photojournalism, The Society for News Design, Atlanta Photojournalism Seminar and other competitions.

== Books and exhibitions ==
In 2013 Gannaway self-published, "Between the Devil and the Deep Blue Sea," a visual essay documenting the working-class seaside community of Ocean View, Virginia. ISBN 978-0-9911098-0-7

Gannaway's work was included in the 2015 Annual Juried Members Exhibition at San Francisco's Cameraworks.
