= The Recorder (Massachusetts newspaper) =

Newspaper published in Massachusetts, US

Greenfield Recorder
- Type: Daily newspaper
- Format: Broadsheet
- Owner: Newspapers of New England
- Publisher: Shawn Palmer
- Editor: Dan Crowley
- Founded: February 1, 1792, as The Impartial Intelligencer
- Headquarters: 14 Hope Street, Suite 101; Greenfield, Massachusetts 01301, United States
- Circulation: 6,117 (as of 2024)
- OCLC number: 13663298
- Website: recorder.com

The Greenfield Recorder is an American daily newspaper published Monday through Saturday mornings in Greenfield, Massachusetts, covering all of Franklin County, Massachusetts. It is owned by Newspapers of New England, which also owns its neighbor to the south, the Daily Hampshire Gazette of Northampton, Massachusetts.

As the Greenfield area's only newspaper of record, The Recorder is the primary source of local news in Franklin County. Originally published in 1792, the paper is one of the oldest daily newspapers in the United States, and the second oldest daily in Massachusetts after the Daily Hampshire Gazette.
