= The Journal of the Gilded Age and Progressive Era =

- Discipline: History
- Language: English
- Edited by: Boyd Cothran, Rosanne Currarino

Publication details
- History: 2002–present
- Publisher: Cambridge University Press for the Society for Historians of the Gilded Age and Progressive Era (United States)
- Frequency: Quarterly

Standard abbreviations
- ISO 4: J. Gilded Age Progress. Era

Indexing
- ISSN: 1537-7814
- LCCN: 2001211907
- JSTOR: 15377814
- OCLC no.: 644846586

Links
- Journal homepage; Cambridge Core

The Journal of the Gilded Age and Progressive Era is a peer-reviewed academic journal of American history. It is sometimes referred to by the acronym JGAPE.

== Quarterly journal ==
The journal publishes scholarly articles and book reviews relating to the period between 1865 and 1920 in the United States. This range covers the eras of American history referred to by historians as the Gilded Age and the Progressive Era. The journal is published quarterly by the Society for Historians of the Gilded Age and Progressive Era and the Rutherford B. Hayes Presidential Center.

The journal is published for the Society for Historians of the Gilded Age and Progressive Era by Cambridge Journals.
