= Monadnock Ledger-Transcript =

New Hampshire newspaper

- Type: Twice-weekly newspaper
- Owner: Newspapers of New England, Inc.
- Founded: 2006; 20 years ago
- Language: English
- City: Peterborough, New Hampshire
- Country: United States
- Website: www.ledgertranscript.com

The Monadnock Ledger-Transcript is a twice-weekly newspaper based in Peterborough, New Hampshire, and covering the Monadnock Region. It was formed in September 2006, when the 50-year-old Monadnock Ledger bought the 150-year-old Peterborough Transcript.

Both newspapers had published once a week. As of 2021, the Ledger-Transcript publishes print editions two days a week with a continuously updated website. It is owned by Newspapers of New England, Inc., a privately owned publisher of nine daily and weekly newspapers in Massachusetts and New Hampshire.

In 2010, the Monadnock Ledger-Transcript was named the Newspaper of the Year by the New England Press Association.

== Peterborough Transcript ==
The Peterborough Transcript was founded in 1849, and remained the only local weekly newspaper in Peterborough for more than a century. It was owned by the Cummings family from 1900 until September 2006, when it was bought by the competing Monadnock Ledger, and became part of the Monadnock Ledger-Transcript.

In a story announcing the merger, then-publisher Joe Cummings described the paper's history:

"John Miller and Kendall Scott founded the Transcript in 1849. Originally named the Contoocook Transcript, this newspaper was the fourth newspaper in Peterborough, the previous three having failed. In its first issue, the publishers stated, 'In commencing this enterprise, we frankly tell you that we have our doubts and fears in regard to its ultimate success.'

"In 1900, George Cummings sold his soapstone quarry in Francestown to purchase the Transcript. It has been in the Cummings family ever since. Four generations have served as its publishers. After George, Paul Cummings Sr. served in that post, followed by his son Paul Jr., who took over the reins in 1946. Joe, Paul's son, presently serves as publisher."

== Monadnock Ledger ==
The Monadnock Ledger started in the mid-1950s as a company newsletter for New Hampshire Ball Bearings. Richard Noyes converted the newsletter into a tabloid weekly based in Jaffrey and then into a full-size newspaper coming out twice a week, as the Jaffrey Ledger one day and the Peterborough Ledger some days later. It later changed to a weekly.

The Ledger was bought by Newspapers of New England in 1986.
