= Mike Pride (writer) =

American author and journalist (1946–2023)

- Born: Charles Michael Pride; July 31, 1946; Bridgeport, Connecticut, U.S.
- Died: April 24, 2023 (aged 76); Palm Harbor, Florida, U.S.
- Education: University of South Florida (BA)
- Occupations: Author, journalist
- Writing career
- Subjects: American Civil War and World War II
- Notable awards: National Press Foundation's Editor of the Year Award in 1987 for overseeing coverage of the death of Teacher in Space Project astronaut Christa McAuliffe, a longtime Concord resident, in the Space Shuttle Challenger disaster.

Charles Michael Pride (July 31, 1946 – April 24, 2023) was an American author and journalist best known for his long tenure as editor of the Concord Monitor of Concord, New Hampshire. He was the author or co-author of several books on the American Civil War and World War II.

== Life and career ==
=== Early life and education ===
Pride was born in Bridgeport, Connecticut and grew up in Florida. He attended the University of Florida in Gainesville, Florida and the University of South Florida in Tampa, Florida, ultimately receiving a B.A. in American studies from the latter institution in 1972. As an enlistee in the United States Army, he served as a Russian linguist from 1966 to 1970. Before moving to New Hampshire, he was a sportswriter at The Tampa Tribune and later served as city editor of the Clearwater Sun and the Tallahassee Democrat. He also worked at the St. Petersburg Times.

=== Career ===
Pride joined the Concord Monitor as managing editor in 1978 and became editor in 1983. Due to New Hampshire's early presidential primary and the candidates that make the rounds in the state, the Monitor enjoyed significant national exposure throughout Pride's tenure at the publication. He completed a non-degree Nieman Fellowship at Harvard University during the 1984–1985 academic year and received the National Press Foundation's Editor of the Year Award in 1987 for overseeing coverage of the death of Teacher in Space Project astronaut Christa McAuliffe, a longtime Concord resident, in the Space Shuttle Challenger disaster. Later in his career, he held three Hoover Institution Media Fellowships at Stanford University from 2005 to 2010 and served as a scholar-in-residence at Gettysburg College.

A four-time Pulitzer Prize juror, he later served as a member of the Pulitzer Prize Board for 9 years, ending his service as co-chair in April 2008.

Pride retired from the Monitor in 2008 but returned in early 2014 to serve briefly as editor during a management transition, stepping down again in May. From September 2014 to July 2017, he served as the administrator of the Pulitzer Prizes, becoming the first (and to date, only) former member of the Pulitzer Board to hold the position. In this capacity, Pride oversaw the awards program's centennial celebration in 2016.

=== Influence ===
Those who worked in the Monitor newsroom under Pride's leadership include Bob Hohler of the Boston Globe, Serial host Sarah Koenig, New York Times reporter Margot Sanger-Katz and Pulitzer-winning photographer Preston Gannaway.

=== Death ===
Pride resided in Bow, New Hampshire. He died from myelofibrosis on April 24, 2023, at the age of 76.

== Author ==
Pride was the co-editor, with Felice Belman, of The New Hampshire Century: Concord Monitor Profiles of One Hundred People Who Shaped It (2001). He was also co-author, with Mark Travis, of My Brave Boys: To War With Colonel Cross and the Fighting Fifth (2001), with Steve Raymond, of Too Dead to Die: A Memoir of Bataan and Beyond (2006), with Meg Heckman, of We Went to War: New Hampshire Remembers (2008).

Pride was the author of Our War: Days and Events in the Fight for the Union (2012). His book, Storm Over Key West: The Civil War and the Call of Freedom, was published by Pineapple Press in 2020.

Pride was also a contributor to Brill's Content.
