= Concord Civic District =

Historic district in New Hampshire, United States

- U.S. National Register of Historic Places
- U.S. Historic district
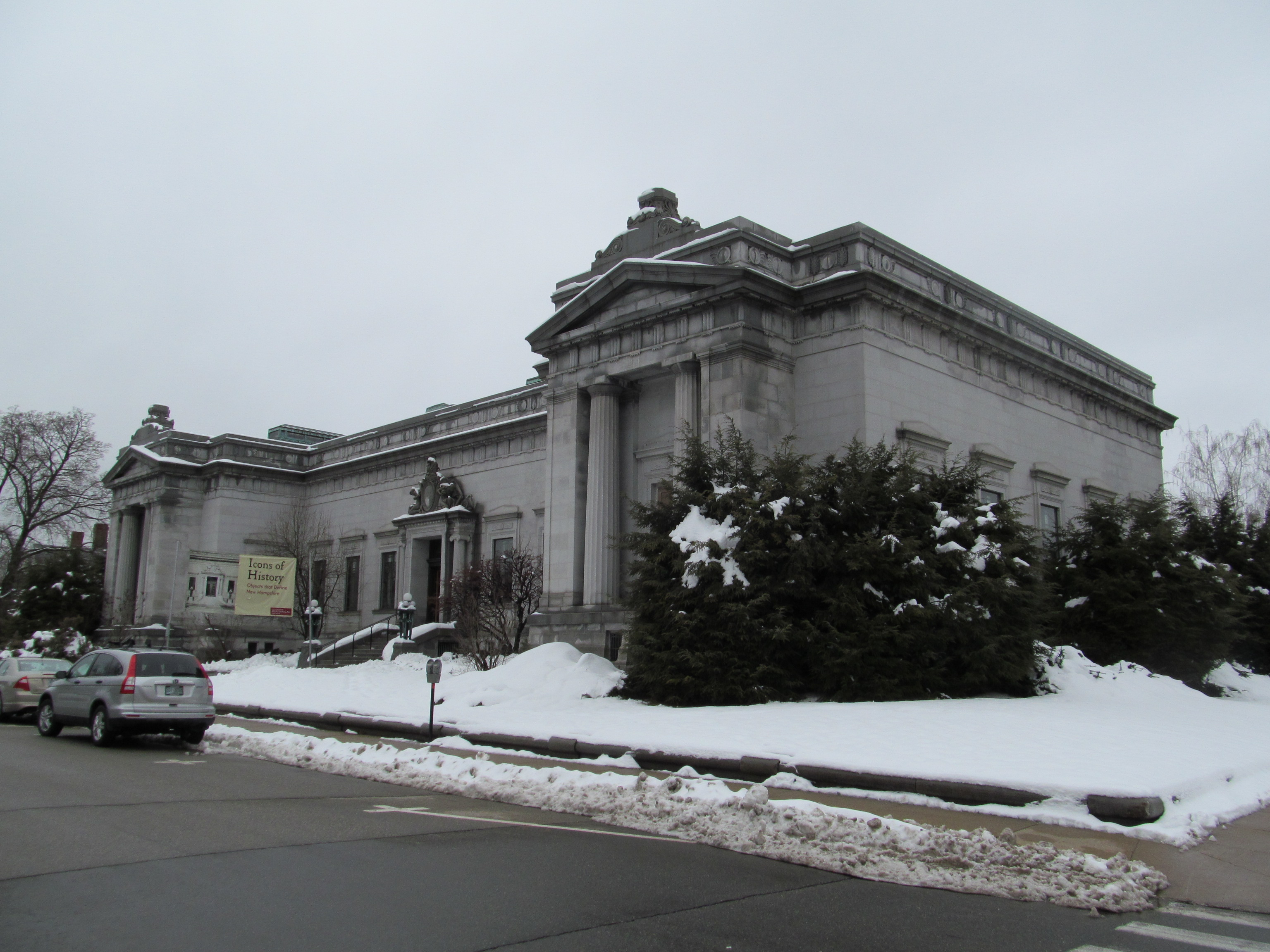
- New Hampshire Historical Society Library

- Location within New Hampshire Location within the United States
- Location: 107 N. Main St., 25 Capitol St., 39--45 Green St., 20--30 Park St., and 33 N. State St., Concord, New Hampshire
- Coordinates: 43°12′24″N 71°32′22″W
- Area: 8.5 acres (3.4 ha)
- Built: 1819
- Architect: Multiple
- Architectural style: Georgian, Federal
- NRHP reference No.: 83004203
- Added to NRHP: December 22, 1983

The Concord Civic District consists of a collection of local and state civic buildings centered on the New Hampshire State House in Concord, New Hampshire. In addition to the State House, the district includes the Legislative Office Building, New Hampshire State Library, Concord City Hall, Concord Community Center, New Hampshire Historical Society, State House Annex, and the Concord Public Library. It also includes statuary and memorial objects placed on the grounds of the State House. The buildings, although architecturally different, are predominantly made out of locally quarried granite, and their grounds are landscaped in similar ways. The district was added to the National Register of Historic Places in 1983.

== State House and grounds ==
The oldest portions of the State House were built in 1819, in a somewhat severe Federal style. The building was enlarged in the 1860s by architect Gridley J. F. Bryant, and again in 1909-10 by Edward Dow of Peabody & Stearns. The three-story granite building is topped by a gilded dome rising to a height of 149 feet (45 m). The Bryant addition added the third floor (under a mansard roof) and dome, as well as the front portico and a single-story addition to the west. The 1910 modifications included replacement of the mansard roof with a full third floor with a flat roof, and additions to the rear of the building. These changes included elements of Beaux Arts styling popular at the time.

The grounds of the State House include statues of figures important in state history: Daniel Webster, John Stark, Franklin Pierce, George H. Perkins, John P. Hale, and Christa McAuliffe are all represented by bronze statues. The grounds also house the Soldiers and Sailors Memorial Arch, marking the eastern entrance to the grounds, which was designed by Peabody & Stearns and dedicated in 1892, and a Veterans Memorial dedicated in 1953.

== Legislative Office Building ==
This three-story granite building was built in the 1880s to house the post office and federal courthouse, serving in one or both of those functions until 1967, when it was acquired by the state and converted for use as legislative offices. Architecturally, the building is roughly in a Chateau style, with Late Gothic and Renaissance Revival details. The building was remodeled in 1974, adding a wing to the west along with a parking garage. This building is also separately listed on the National Register.

== See also ==
- Concord Historic District
- National Register of Historic Places listings in Merrimack County, New Hampshire
