= New Hampshire State House =

Capitol building of the U.S. state of New Hampshire

- U.S. Historic district – Contributing property
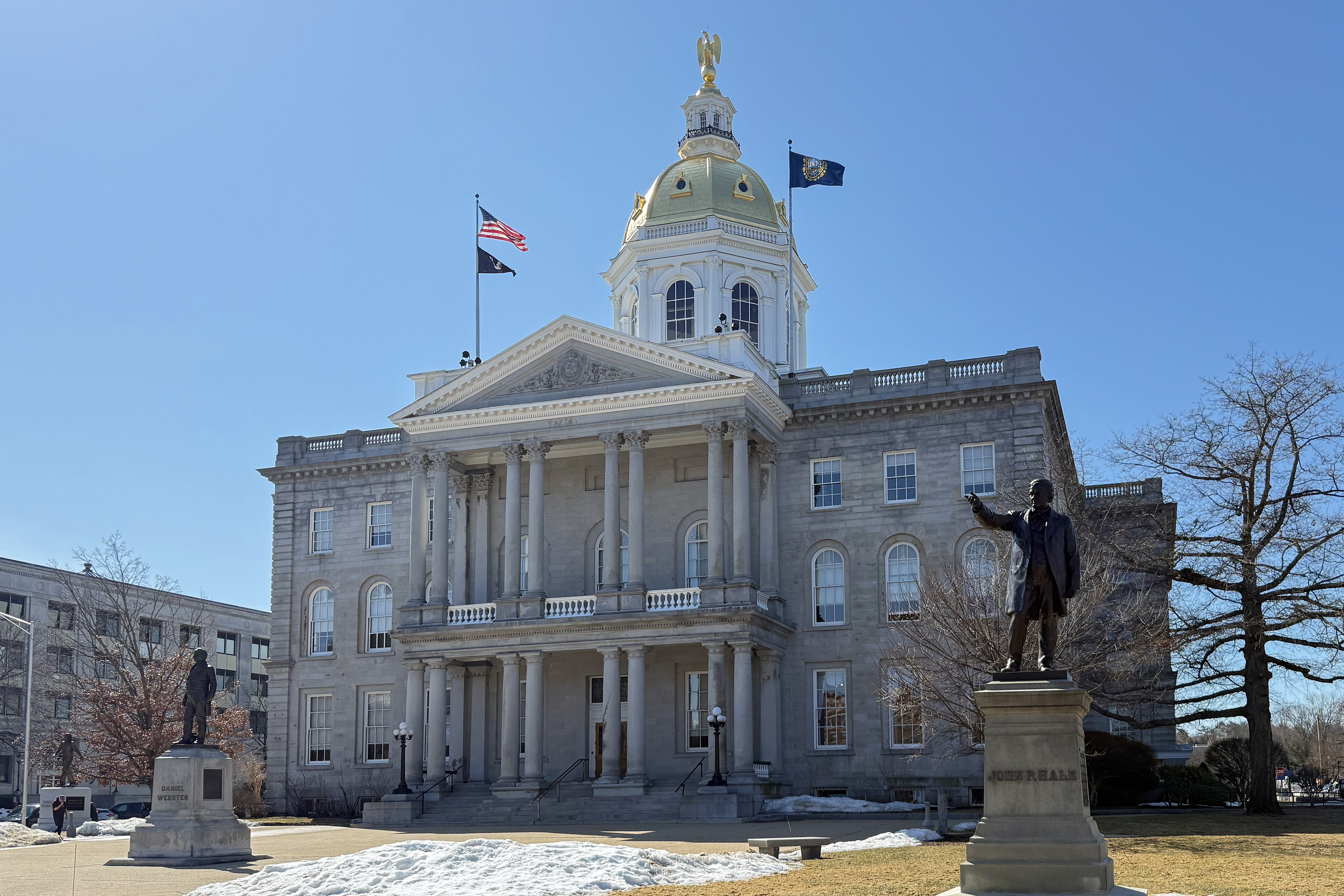
- The capitol in 2025
- Location: 107 North Main Street; Concord, New Hampshire
- Coordinates: 43.206748°N 71.538127°W
- Area: 2.6 acres (11,000 m^{2})
- Built: 1819; 207 years ago
- Architect: Stuart James Park
- Architectural style: Greek Revival
- Part of: Concord Civic District (ID83004203)
- Designated CP: December 22, 1983

The New Hampshire State House, located in Concord at 107 North Main Street, is the state capitol building of New Hampshire. The capitol houses the New Hampshire General Court, Governor, and Executive Council. The building was constructed on a block framed by Park Street (named in honor of the architect, Stuart James Park) to the north, Main Street to the east, Capitol Street to the south, and North State Street to the west.

== Construction ==
The current statehouse was designed in 1814, and paid for by the city of Concord. In 1816, local Quakers sold the lot where their meetinghouse was to the state of New Hampshire, and the building was built between 1816 and 1819 by architect Stuart Park.

The building was built in the Greek Revival style with smooth granite blocks. The entrance is covered by a small projecting portico supported by Doric columns. The balcony above is lined with a balustrade separated by Corinthian columns supporting a pediment. Another balustrade lines the edge of the flat roof.

The windows on the first floor are rectangular in shape, those on the second floor are arched, and those on the third floor are square panels. An octagonal drum with large arched windows supports a golden dome with bull's-eye windows and supporting a small lantern. A statue of a huge gold-painted wooden war eagle looking to the left was raised in 1818. In 1957, it was replaced with an element-proof peace eagle statue looking to the right, with the original eagle given to the New Hampshire Historical Society.

=== The grounds ===
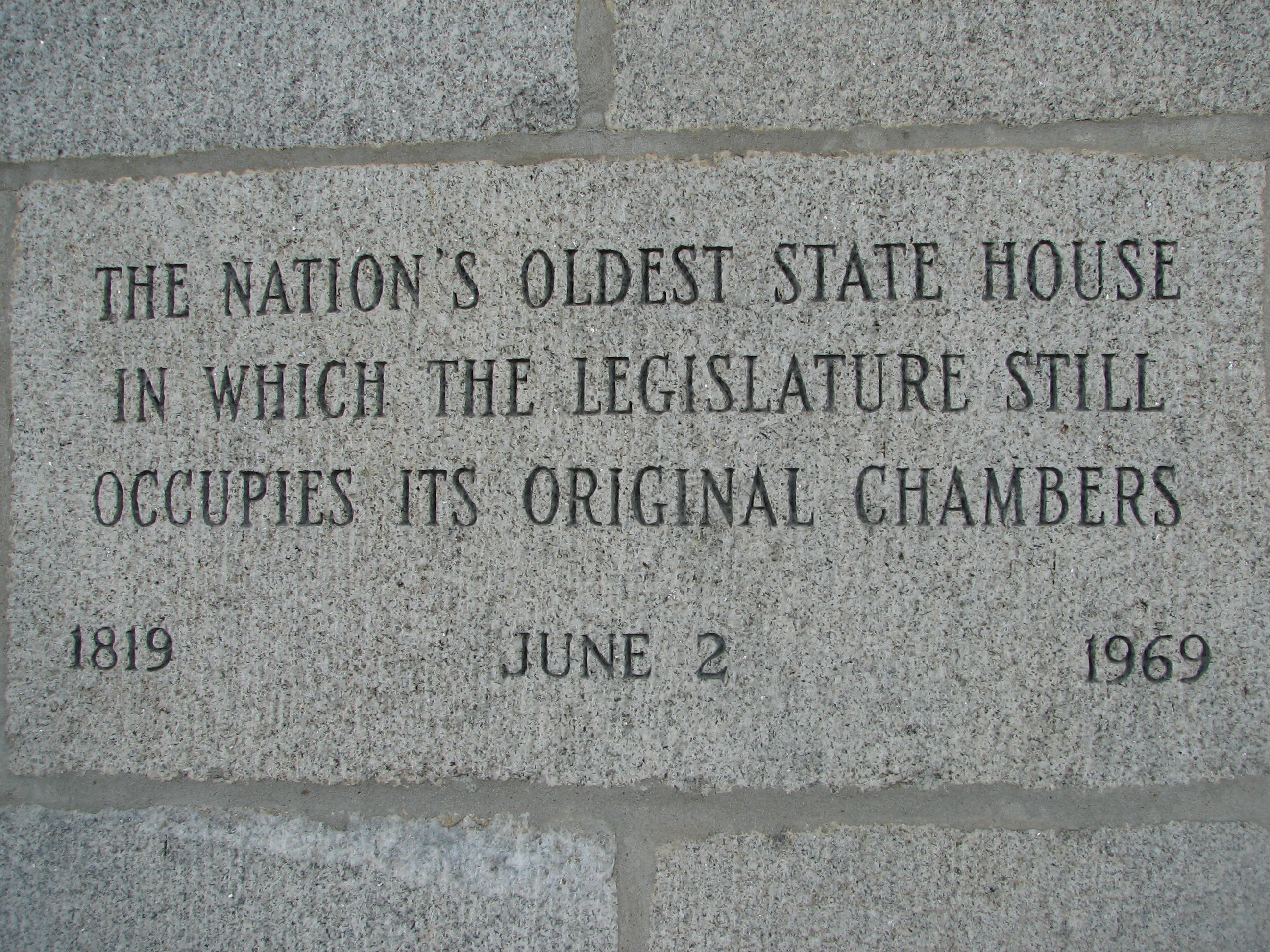
New Hampshire State House inscription

The capitol grounds occupy 2.6 acres (11,000 m^{2}) and are enclosed by a granite fence. No gate impedes the flow of visitors, as this is "the people's house". The following eight statues or memorials are on the grounds, installed at various times from 1886 to 2024:

Subject	Designer or artist	Date dedicated	Ref.
Secretary of State Daniel Webster	Thomas Ball	June 17, 1886	
General John Stark	Carl Conrads (statue), John A. Fox (pedestal)	October 23, 1890	
Senator John Parker Hale	William E. Chandler (sponsor)	August 3, 1892	
Statue of George H. Perkins	Daniel Chester French (sculptor), Henry Bacon (architect)	April 25, 1902	
Statue of Franklin Pierce	Henry Augustus Lukeman	November 25, 1914	
Liberty Bell replica	n/a	July 5, 1950	
New Hampshire Law Enforcement Officers' Memorial	Emil Birch	September 26, 1998	
Astronaut Christa McAuliffe	Benjamin Victor	September 2, 2024	

=== Hall of Flags ===
The main entrance opens into the Hall of Flags. The hall is designed after Charles Bulfinch's design for the Massachusetts State House. The hall features 107 battle flags for New Hampshire representing the Civil War, Spanish–American War, World War I, World War II, and the Vietnam War.

=== Senate Chamber ===
The Senate Chamber is located in the northeast corner of the capitol. It houses the 24-member chamber.

Large arched windows light the chamber. Behind the rostrum are large murals, arched like the windows, depicting events of the state's history. The mural to the left depicts the first commencement at Dartmouth College; the next, Daniel Webster reading the United States Constitution; after that, Abbott Thayer teaching his art class; and the last, John Stark preparing for battle in the Revolution. The murals were painted by Barry Faulkner in 1942.

Large curved tables surround the rostrum and are replicas of originals.

=== House Chamber ===
The House Chamber houses the largest state legislative body in the United States, with 400 members. Large arched windows line the walls. On the rostrum hang portraits of John P. Hale, Abraham Lincoln, George Washington, Franklin Pierce, and Daniel Webster.

== History ==
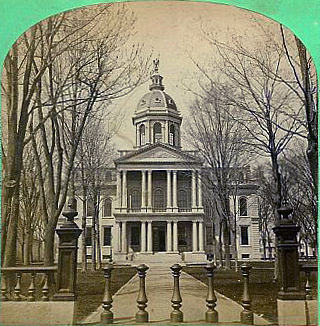
A stereograph view of the New Hampshire State House, ca. 1875

The first session of the General Court began in 1819. The State House is the oldest state capitol in which both houses of the legislature meet in their original chambers. (The current chamber of the Massachusetts Senate is older but was originally used by the House of Representatives.)

In 1814, discussion began about building a suitable building for the state capitol. The General Court debated three locations: Concord, Hopkinton, and Salisbury, which offered $7,000 to be the capital. The legislature chose Concord as the location in 1816. Granite used to build the capitol came from the present-day Swenson quarries; the cutting, shaping and facing of the stone was performed by inmates of the state prison. The prison building was also constructed by Stuart Park.

The cost of construction for the capitol was $82,000. The building was designed and built to house the General Court, its committees, the Governor and Council, the Secretary of State, the State Treasurer, and the State Library.

During Meldrim Thomson Jr.'s governorship (1973–1979) the lights that shone on the State House's golden dome at night were turned off to save energy. This caused controversy because the illuminated dome had been an informal symbol of Concord for many years. With the help of several New Hampshire legislators, the lights were activated again in the first days of Hugh Gallen's first term as governor.

In 2016 the gold dome was regilded with 24 karat leafing, a process that has occurred several times over the history of the building. The 2016 project cost $2.8 million.

== See also ==
- New Hampshire State House press
- List of state and territorial capitols in the United States
- New Hampshire Historical Marker No. 66: State Capitol
