= Concord Monitor =

Daily newspaper in New Hampshire, US

- Type: Daily newspaper
- Format: Broadsheet
- Owner: Newspapers of New England
- Publisher: Steve Leone
- Founded: 1864
- Headquarters: 1 Monitor Drive, Concord, New Hampshire 03302, U.S.
- OCLC number: 10828908
- Website: concordmonitor.com

The Concord Monitor is the daily newspaper for Concord, the state capital of New Hampshire. It also covers surrounding towns in Merrimack County, most of Belknap County, as well as portions of Grafton, Rockingham and Hillsborough counties. The Monitor has several times been named as one of the best small papers in America and in April 2008, became a Pulitzer Prize winning paper, when photographer Preston Gannaway was honored for feature photography.

After publishing seven days a week for decades, starting in March 2024, it ceased print publication on Sundays.

== History ==
The Monitor has been published continuously since 1864, under a variety of names, including the Evening Monitor, and owners. In the late 19th century it was owned by a publishing company called the Republican Press Association which also published a paper named the Independent Statesman. Its masthead calls it the Concord Monitor and New Hampshire Patriot, although the Monitor name is the only one in widespread use. James M. Langley, who had acquired both publications in the 1920s, was responsible for the merger.

William Dwight, publisher of the Holyoke Transcript-Telegram in Massachusetts, bought the Monitor from Langley in 1961, becoming its publisher. When he retired in 1975, his son-in-law George W. Wilson took over both the Monitor and Newspapers of New England Inc., the holding company of Dwight's newspapers in Concord, Holyoke and Greenfield, Massachusetts.

The Monitor has been flagship of this chain — now encompassing four dailies and three weeklies in New Hampshire and Massachusetts — since 1993, when the Transcript-Telegram folded.

Its 2004 circulation was 22,000 daily, 23,000 Sundays. More recent figures put the daily circulation around 20,000.

In 2005, George W. Wilson retired as president of Newspapers of New England. Tom Brown became president of NNE, and Geordie Wilson, George W. Wilson's son, became publisher of the Monitor. Brown retired in 2009 and was replaced by Aaron Julien, George W. Wilson's son-in-law. John Winn Miller, former publisher of The Olympian of Olympia, Wash., was named the Monitor's publisher in 2010.

In early 2013, Mark Travis, who had spent more than two decades at the paper as a reporter and editor, succeeded Miller as publisher. In June 2013, Travis also became editor. Travis left his dual roles at the paper in February 2014, with David Sangiorgio stepping in as acting publisher. Heather McKernan replaced Sangiorgio as publisher in May 2017; she also continued to hold the title of publisher at the Monadnock Ledger-Transcript in Peterborough, another NNE-owned newspaper.

== Awards and honors ==
Photographer Preston Gannaway won the 2008 Pulitzer Prize for Feature Photography in April 2008, shortly after departing from the Monitor. Gannaway was honored for her work on a project called "Remember Me" chronicling a local woman's death.

It was the first time a newspaper in New Hampshire was awarded the prize. The Monitor stood out as the smallest paper to win an award that year, with its circulation just a fraction of the next smallest, the Milwaukee Journal Sentinel.

While 2008 was the first year the Monitor or one of its staff won a Pulitzer, the paper has a number of alums who have been honored, including Jo Becker of The New York Times and Steven Pearlstein of The Washington Post, both of whom also won the award in 2008.

In 1999, the Columbia Journalism Review said that the Monitor was the best small paper in America and Time magazine has named it one of "America's best newspapers".

== Notable people ==
- Jo Becker, former writer, and current New York Times reporter
- William E. Chandler, U.S. Senator and Secretary of the Navy, owner and editor of the Monitor for 40 years
- Kate Davidson, former reporter and current Morning Money newsletter writer for Politico
- Preston Gannaway, a photographer awarded a 2008 Pulitzer Prize for her work while at the Monitor
- Dan Habib, former photo editor and current documentary filmmaker
- Sarah Koenig, former writer, current public radio personality, producer of This American Life and executive producer and host of the podcast Serial (podcast).
- James M. Langley, former editor and U.S. ambassador to Pakistan
- George H. Moses, former editor, later a United States Senator from New Hampshire
- Steven Pearlstein, former writer, and current Washington Post columnist
- Edward Nathan Pearson, former city editor of the Concord Evening Monitor and New Hampshire Secretary of State from 1899 to 1915
- Mike Pride, editor emeritus and later administrator of the Pulitzer Prizes from 2014 to 2017
- Margot Sanger-Katz, former reporter and current New York Times health policy reporter

== See also ==
- New Hampshire State House press
- Foster's Daily Democrat
- New Hampshire Union Leader
- Telegraph of Nashua
- The Portsmouth Herald
