= Daily Hampshire Gazette =

Newspaper in Massachusetts, US

- Type: Daily newspaper
- Format: Broadsheet
- Owner: Newspapers of New England
- Publisher: Shawn Palmer
- Editor: Dan Crowley
- Founded: September 6, 1786; 239 years ago
- Headquarters: 23 Service Center Road; Northampton, Massachusetts 01060; United States
- Circulation: 10,111 Daily; 10,111 Saturday (as of 2022)
- Website: gazettenet.com

The Daily Hampshire Gazette is a six-day morning daily newspaper based in Northampton, Massachusetts, United States, and covering all of Hampshire County, southern towns of Franklin County, and Holyoke. The newspaper prints Monday through Saturday, with the latter labeled "Weekend Edition". As of 2026, it is the longest running daily newspaper in Massachusetts.

== Sisters and competitors ==
Newspapers of New England, based in Concord, New Hampshire, owns both the Gazette and the main daily to the north, The Recorder of Greenfield, Massachusetts. The Gazette also competes in its own coverage area with The Republican, a regional daily in Springfield.

In addition to the daily newspaper, Gazette newsrooms publish one weekly newspaper serving Northampton's suburbs, based in the newspaper's Northampton building. NNE also owns one regional alternative weekly.

- The Amherst Bulletin, published every Friday, with a distribution of 6,400, covers several towns east of Northampton: Amherst, Deerfield, Hadley, Leverett, Pelham, Shutesbury, and Sunderland, Massachusetts.
- The Valley Advocate, an alternative weekly, ceased print publication in late March 2020 and went to online only. It had been distributed for free throughout the Pioneer Valley. It began as an independent newspaper in 1973 and had a circulation of about 25,974.

== History ==
First published September 6, 1786—with a news item about Shays' Rebellion—the Gazette is one of oldest newspapers in the country, and had been owned by the DeRose family since 1929 before being sold for an undisclosed amount of money in 2005. The paper was sold to Newspapers of New England, said then-publisher and co-owner Peter L. DeRose, because there were no younger members of the family willing to take over the business.

DeRose, who stayed on as publisher for another year under the new owners, became co-publisher upon the death of his father, Charles N. DeRose, in 1970. Charles' mother, Harriet Williams DeRose, had purchased the Gazette in 1929. Peter and his brother Charles W. DeRose were credited with moving the newspaper's offices to a modern building just outside downtown Northampton on Conz Street; paying and treating Gazette employees well; and being a pioneer in establishing an Internet presence, now known as gazettenet.com.

Originally an afternoon newspaper, the Gazette responded to shifting readership demographics by moving its publication time earlier in the day, although it long resisted making the switch to early morning delivery on weekdays (the Saturday edition converted to morning distribution in the early 1970s). By the time of the Newspapers of New England sale, the Gazette was available at downtown newsstands as early as 11:30 a.m., although subscribers still had to wait until after mid-afternoon for delivery by schoolchildren. Under the new management, however, the Gazette opted to make the change to six-day morning publication in September 2006, partly to compete better with the rival Springfield Republican.

In late 2007, Newspapers of New England purchased a competing alternative weekly newspaper, the Valley Advocate of Northampton. The Advocate had begun as an independent newspaper but was then owned by Advocate Weekly Newspapers, which also published weeklies in Connecticut. The Advocate's owner at the time, the Tribune Company, sold the Massachusetts weekly to focus on its Connecticut properties, which included the Hartford Courant daily. The Gazette's owners announced they would move the Valley Advocate offices to Northampton, but would retain separate news and advertising staffs from the daily. In late March 2020 the Valley Advocate stopped their print edition and went to online only.

In November 2018, 72 staffers at the Daily Hampshire Gazette and Valley Advocate informed newspaper management that they were forming a union with the NewsGuild-Communications Workers of America and seek voluntary recognition from owners. In July 2020 Newspapers of New England shut down the press, opened in 2007, and moved the printing of the Daily Hampshire Gazette, the Amherst Bulletin, and the Greenfield Recorder, to an outside printing company.
