= Newspapers of New England, Inc. =

Privately owned newspaper publisher

Newspapers of New England
- Company type: Private
- Industry: Newspapers
- Founded: Late 1970s
- Headquarters: Concord, New Hampshire
- Key people: Chuck Goodrich, president and CEO
- Products: Concord Monitor and six other newspapers in New England
- Website: www.nnedigital.com

Newspapers of New England, Inc. (NNE) is a privately owned publisher of nine daily and weekly newspapers in the U.S. states of Massachusetts and New Hampshire.

The company's flagship publication is the Concord Monitor, in New Hampshire's capital. Its largest circulation newspaper in Massachusetts is the Daily Hampshire Gazette of Northampton.

== History ==
The company was founded in the late 1970s as a holding company for various properties owned by the Dwight family, longtime publishers of the (now defunct) Holyoke Transcript-Telegram. Under the leadership of publisher Minnie Dwight and her son, William, the T-T in 1955 bought The Recorder-Gazette of Greenfield, Massachusetts. Minnie died two years later, and William bought the Monitor in 1961. In 1960, the T-T bought the Edwardsville Intelligencer in Illinois; the paper was sold in 1964.

When son-in-law George W. Wilson, publisher of the Monitor, was named company president in the late 1970s, the T-T, Recorder and Monitor were placed under the umbrella of Newspapers of New England. The company added the Valley News of Lebanon, New Hampshire, in 1981.

In the 1980s, NNE added the weekly Monadnock Ledger to its portfolio, but soon had to shed its original flagship: In January 1993, the 110-year-old Transcript-Telegram was closed after four years of heavy losses.

NNE remained the publisher of the Concord, Greenfield and Lebanon dailies, plus the Ledger, until purchasing the Daily Hampshire Gazette in 2005.

In December 2007, the company announced it would buy one of the Gazette's main competitors, the alternative weekly Valley Advocate of Easthampton, which had been founded in 1973. The Advocate was owned by Tribune Company, which also publishes the Hartford Courant and Advocate weeklies in Connecticut. Advocate circulation at the time was given at 50,000.

== Properties ==
The following daily and weekly newspapers are published by Newspapers of New England:

- Amherst Bulletin of Amherst, Massachusetts (weekly)
- Athol Daily News of Athol, Massachusetts
- Concord Monitor of Concord, New Hampshire
- Daily Hampshire Gazette of Northampton, Massachusetts
- Monadnock Ledger-Transcript of Peterborough, New Hampshire (twice-weekly)
- The Greenfield Recorder of Greenfield, Massachusetts
- The Valley Advocate of Northampton, Massachusetts
- Valley News of Lebanon, New Hampshire
