= Mary Bird =

Mary Bird may refer to:

- Mary Bird (medical missionary) (1859–1914), English Christian missionary to Iran
- Mary Bird (skier) (1910–2002), American alpine skier, competitor at the 1936 Winter Olympics.
- Mary Brave Bird (1954–2013), Sicangu Lakota writer and activist
- Mary Page Bird (1866–1924), American poet and novelist
- Mary Runnells Bird (1870–1961), Canadian physician

== See also ==
- Mary Byrd (disambiguation)
