= Jane Elizabeth Hoyt-Stevens =

American physician

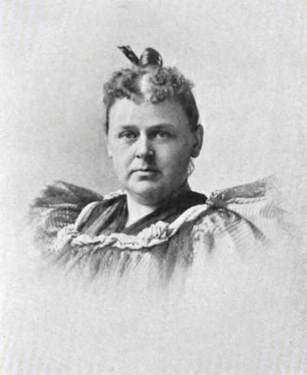
- Jane Elizabeth Hoyt-Stevens, from an 1895 publication
- Born: Jane Elizabeth Hoyt; September 23, 1860; Concord, New Hampshire
- Died: July 1, 1933 (aged 72); Concord, New Hampshire
- Occupations: Physician, suffragist

Jane Elizabeth Hoyt-Stevens (September 23, 1860 – July 1, 1933) was an American physician and suffragist based in New Hampshire.

== Early life and education ==
Jane Elizabeth Hoyt was born in Concord, New Hampshire, the daughter of Sewell Hoyt and Hannah Elizabeth Nichols. She graduated from Wellesley College and earned her medical degree from the Woman's Medical College of the New York Infirmary in 1890. She served an internship at the New England Hospital for Women and Children in 1891 and 1892. She pursued further medical training in Europe.

== Career ==
Hoyt was a physician on the staff of the New York Infant Asylum from 1889 to 1890, and at Laselle Seminary in Massachusetts from 1890 to 1891. From 1896 to 1899, she was a physician at Pillsbury Hospital in her hometown.

Hoyt-Stevens was a member of the American Medical Association, the American Public Health Association, the New Hampshire Historical Society, and the New Hampshire Equal Suffrage Association.

In 1906, she represented the New Hampshire Medical Society as a delegate to the International Medical Congress in Lisbon, and traveled in Spain and North Africa during that trip. She met Gandhi during an extended visit to India, and published writings about her impressions of him in 1931.

She encouraged a younger generation of women in their medical careers, including Mary Runnells Bird, and donated her family home, an "impressive mansion", to the use of the New Hampshire Congregational Conference, reserving "a small upstairs apartment" for her own use.

== Personal life ==
Hoyt married George Washington Stevens in 1907. She adopted a son in Spain, named Abelardo Linares. She died in 1933, in Concord, New Hampshire, at the age of 72.
