= Concord Area Transit =

Public transportation provider in New Hampshire, US

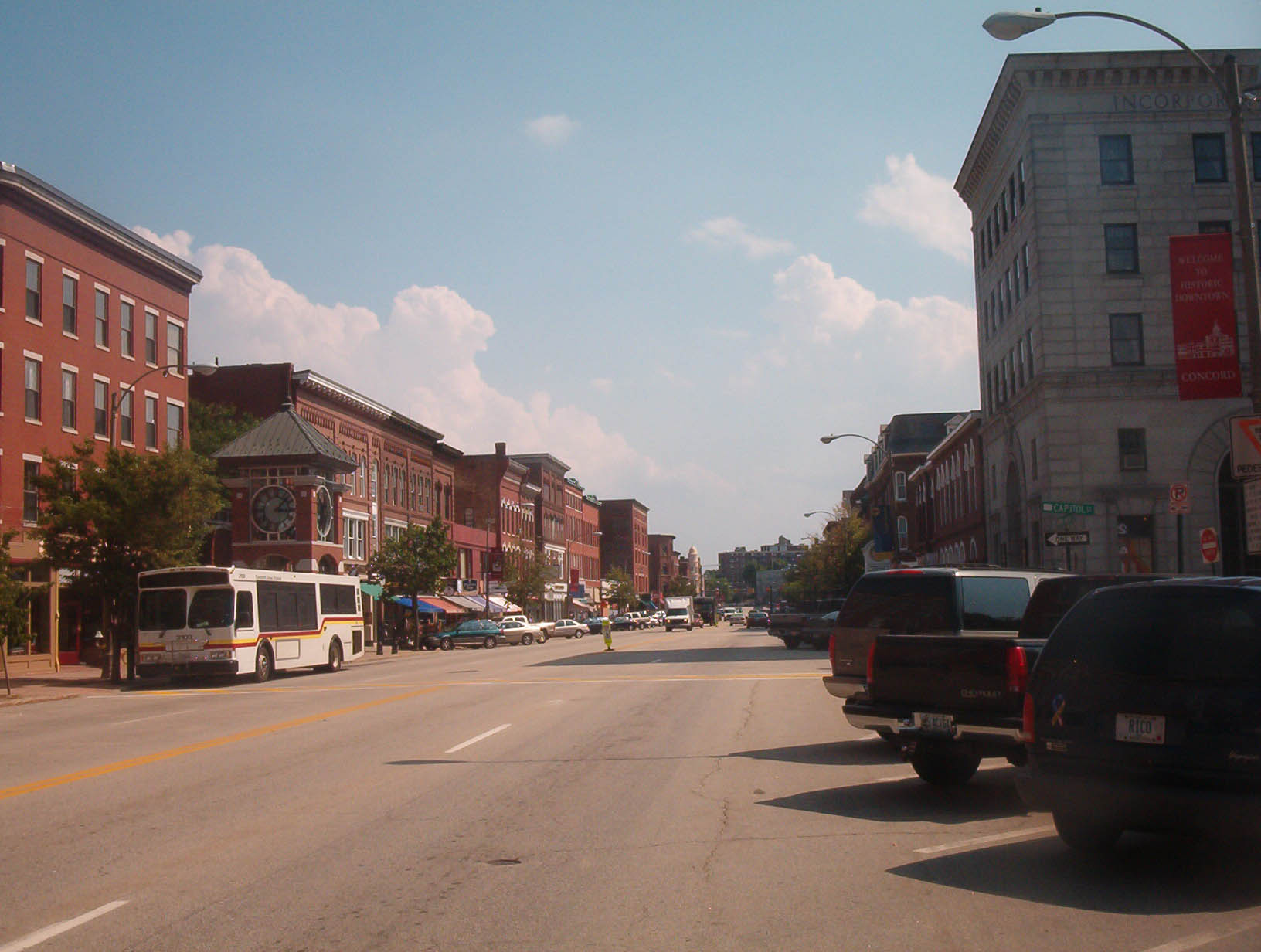
- A bus in Downtown Concord in 2005.
- Founded: 1989
- Headquarters: 2 Industrial Park Drive
- Locale: Concord, New Hampshire
- Service area: Merrimack County, New Hampshire, Belknap County, New Hampshire
- Service type: Bus service, paratransit
- Routes: 3
- Annual ridership: 115,000 (2024)
- Website: www.concordareatransit.com

Concord Area Transit (CAT) is the primary provider of public transportation in Concord, New Hampshire, United States. It provides fixed route service on weekdays in Concord, as well as local demand-response transportation for seniors and people with disabilities. In 2024, it started a new commuter route called the Concord Laconia Connector, with intercity service to Laconia but lower than expected ridership and a shortage of funds, this route was suspended in January 2026, after 2 years. The full system had a ridership of 115,900 in FY2024.

== History ==
In the 1970s, there was discussion about the feasibility of bus service in Concord. Concord's City Council contracted with the Community Services Council to conduct a study. This study served as the framework for the system that was developed. Prior to 1989, Capital Transit had operated bus service in Concord and the YMCA had operated some senior service.

In 1989, the city of Concord went out to bid for public transit service. Since high bids came in to operate the service, the city's mayor appointed a committee made up of supporters and detractors of the bus service. The outcome was to approach the Community Action Program Belknap-Merrimack Counties, Inc. (CAPBMCI) to provide the service.

CAPBMCI operated and continues to operate senior bus service in the region and, therefore, was in a position to step up to the plate. The agreement was that the city would provide match support (annual federal grants for transit require a 20% or 50% match depending on the type of funding) to purchase buses and three years of operating support as a pilot program. A City of Concord Advisory Committee would work with CAPBMCI.

CAPBMCI began CAT and still operates it as one of its programs and transportation systems. From CAT's inception, it included fixed-route service as well as weekday service for seniors and people with disabilities. The routes were from Concord Heights to Concord Hospital and from Penacook to the South End of Concord, along with service for people with disabilities and seniors. At this time, the first Orion buses were used on the routes. Trolley-shaped buses were rented and operated during the six-week holiday season for three years. These trolleys were supported by the Chamber of Commerce, Concord Hospital and Steeplegate Mall. CAMBMCI also assumed operation of senior service that had been operated by the YMCA. In 1991, the City of Concord began to provide CAPBMCI with ongoing funding to support public transportation beyond the three-year pilot.

In 1999, the Americans with Disabilities Act (ADA) mandated specific regulations for bus service for people with disabilities. Since CAT already provided such service, it ensured that it conformed to the new ADA regulations. In 1999, CAT also operated the Penacook, Heights, Manchester Street and senior service routes. Manchester Street service was funded through a three-year Congestion Mitigation and Air Quality (CMAQ) grant.

By 2005, CAT had started a Crosstown bus service between Airport Road and Concord Hospital. The Crosstown bus developed into the Industrial Park route that operates between Industrial Park Drive and the hospital today. CAT started year-round trolley service in 2008 when it received a three-year CMAQ grant, with matching funds from Delta Dental, a dental insurance provider with its state headquarters in Concord.

In January 2024, a fourth route commenced service from Penacook village with stops in Boscawen, Franklin, Tilton and Belmont, until its terminus in downtown Laconia. CAT Launches New Commuter Bus Route – the Concord-Laconia Connector

(Concord, NH | February 29, 2024) Have you heard? Concord Area Transit started running the Concord-Laconia Connector intercity commuter bus route last month. This service is offered fare-free connecting Concord to Franklin, Tilton, and Laconia.

The Concord-Laconia Connector (CLC) has 15 bus stops along the route, including major employment, medical and retail destinations such as Merchant’s Way, Merrimack County Complex (Nursing Home and Couty Corrections), Franklin Industrial Park, J. Jill Distribution Center, Tanger Outlet, Belknap Mall, Concord Hospital-Laconia, and downtown Laconia.

The bus makes four round trips per day with the first leaving downtown Concord at 5:45 AM arriving at Concord Hospital-Laconia at 7:26 AM and the Church St parking lot downtown Laconia at 7:31am.

Despite strong interest from some riders, overall use of the route did not reach levels needed to sustain long-term operations and CAT made the decision to permanently suspend the route January 2026, just two years later.

Concord Area Transit Announces Suspension of Concord–Laconia Commuter Bus Route

Concord, NH — Concord Area Transit (CAT), operated by the Community Action Program Belknap-Merrimack Inc., announces the permanent suspension of the Concord–Laconia Connector (CLC) commuter bus route, effective January 30, 2026.

The decision comes after careful review of ridership trends and current funding limitations. Despite strong interest from some riders, overall use of the route did not reach levels needed to sustain long-term operations. After a thorough evaluation of ridership data and operational needs, CAT and the CAPBM board of directors made the decision that suspending the route is the fiscally responsible option.

“This was not an easy decision,” said Terri Paige, Transportation Director. “We know this route matters to commuters traveling between Concord and Laconia, and we truly appreciate the community’s understanding. Given the funding available to us right now, we must make choices that allow us to maintain stable and reliable service across our system.”The Concord-Laconia Connector was CAT's first intercity route.

== Routes ==
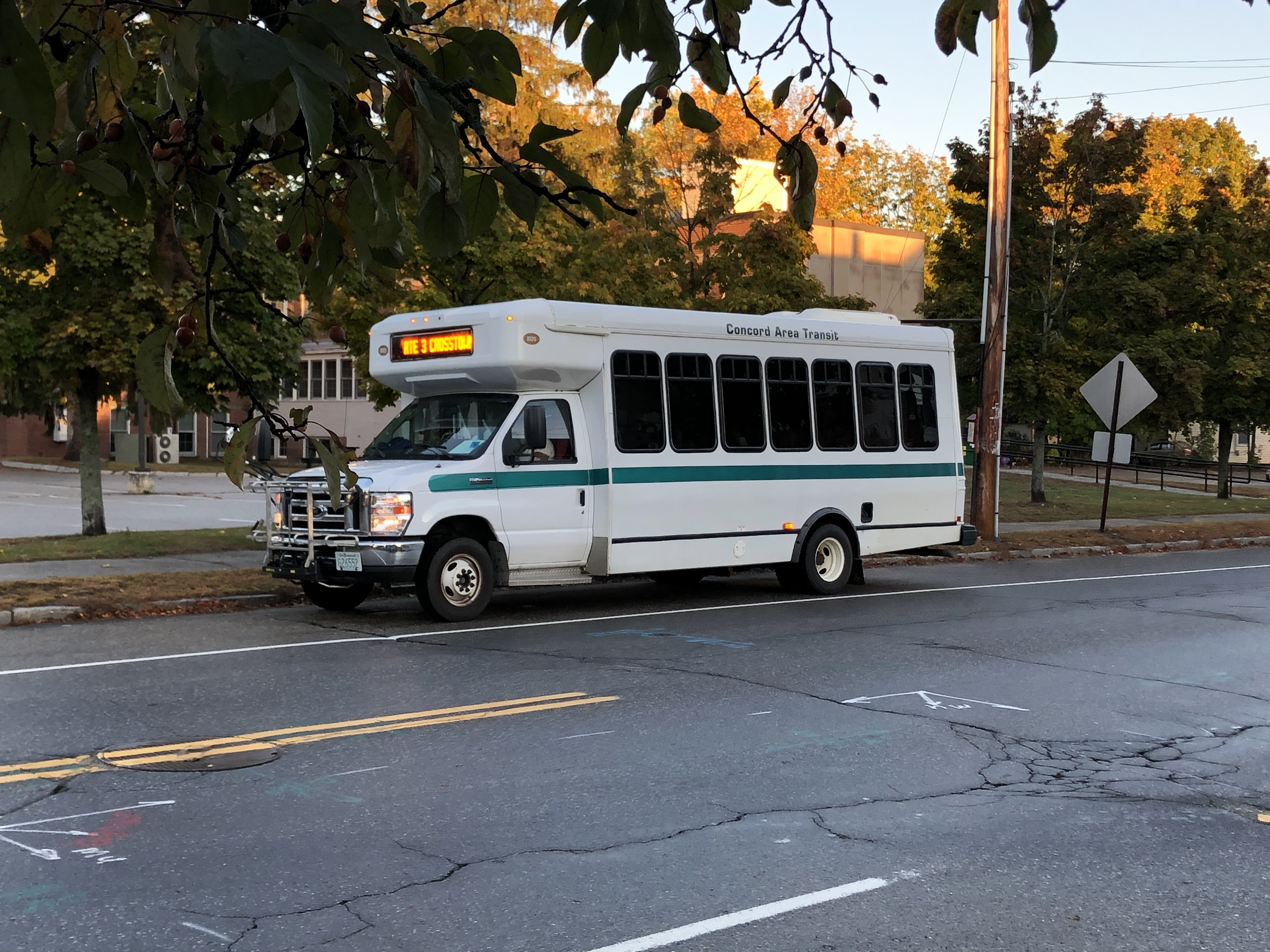
Route 3 Crosstown bus on South Street, October 2020

- Route 1 - Penacook
- Route 2 - Heights
- Route 3 - Crosstown
- ADA Paratransit Service
- Concord Senior Transit
