= Kimball School =

Coordinates: 43°12′10″N 71°32′29″W

- 17 North Spring Street, Concord, NH; United States

Information
- Type: Public school
- Principal: Susan Noyes (2008-2012)
- Website: www.concord.k12.nh.us/new/kim.asp

Kimball School was a public elementary school located in Concord, New Hampshire. It was torn down during the 2011–2012 school year and replaced by the Christa McAuliffe School, a new building located on the site of the old school.

Kimball was one of five elementary schools operating in SAU-8 (the Concord School District). The last principal was Susan Noyes, who had been at Kimball since the 2008 school year. Chris Demers was the assistant principal. Serving the west side of Concord, the building had been in existence for over one hundred years. It was previously a high school and a junior high school in Concord.
