= Parker Academy =

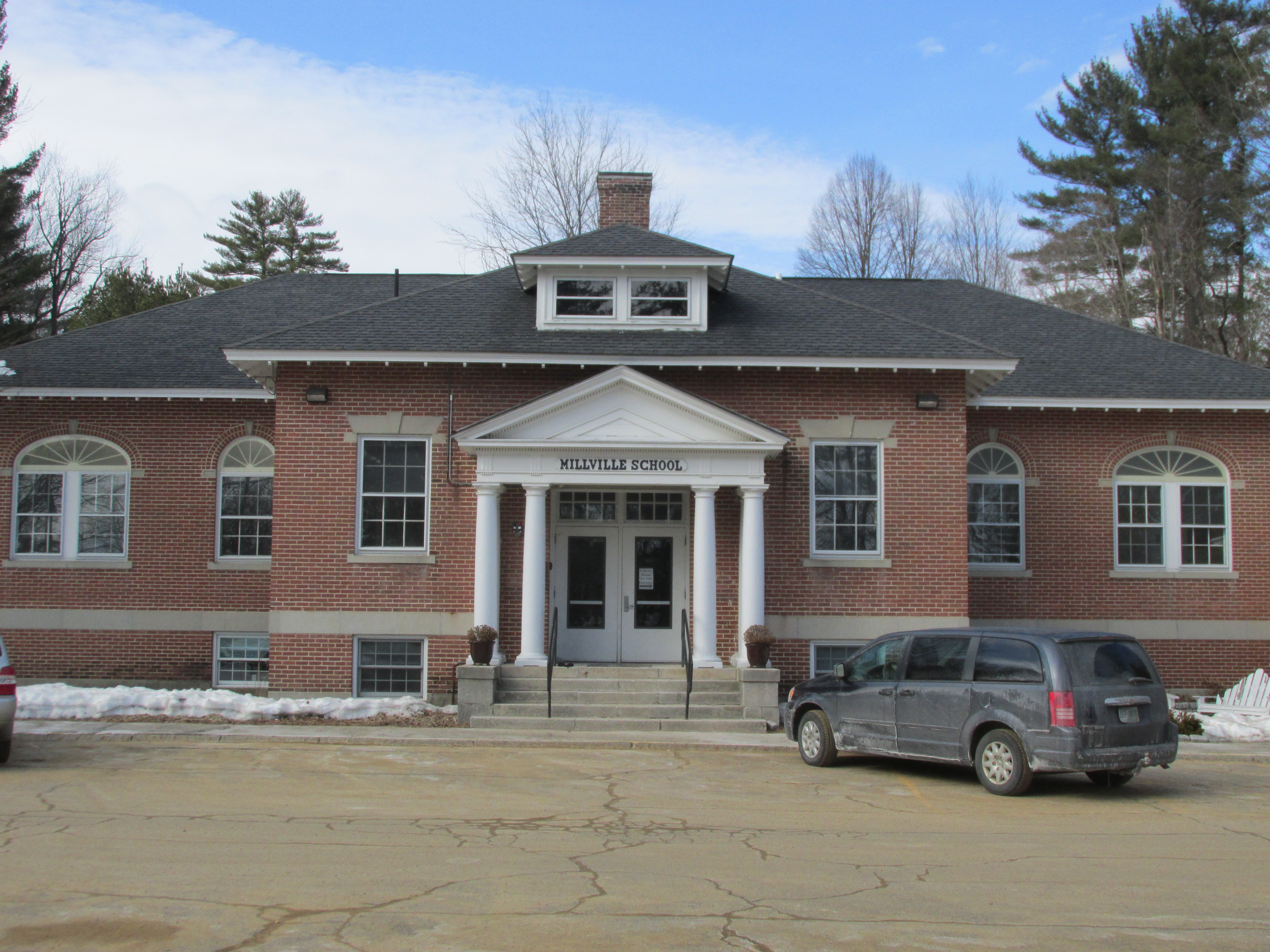
- Parker Academy in former Millville School building

Location
- 2 Fisk Road; Concord, New Hampshire 03301; United States
- 43.197303°N 71.575073°W

Information
- Established: 2001
- School number: 27935
- Directors: David Parker
- Teaching staff: 16.8 (FTE) (as of 2007-08)
- Grades: 6-12
- Enrollment: 41 (as of 2007-08)
- Average class size: 4
- Student to teacher ratio: 2.4 (as of 2007-08)
- Affiliation: Nonsectarian
- Website: http://www.parkeracademy.com/

Parker Academy is a private day school in Concord, New Hampshire, United States. Established in 2001, the school serves students in grades 6 through 12.

== Campus ==
The Academy's high school is housed in the former Millville School. The middle school is located in a Victorian building at 33 Pleasant Street in downtown Concord, which has variously housed tutoring services, private college counselling, and a specialist speech and drama school.

== Curriculum ==
Parker Academy offers a curriculum that meets state guidelines. Further, the school is approved to provide programs for students with ADD, ADHD, autism, dyslexia, emotional disturbance (mild depression and anxiety disorders), non-verbal learning disabilities, and speech and language disabilities.

== Extracurricular activities ==
An outdoor Adventure Program is available to students.
