= Saint John Regional School =

Catholic school in New Hampshire, United States

Coordinates: 43.1993°N 71.5342°W

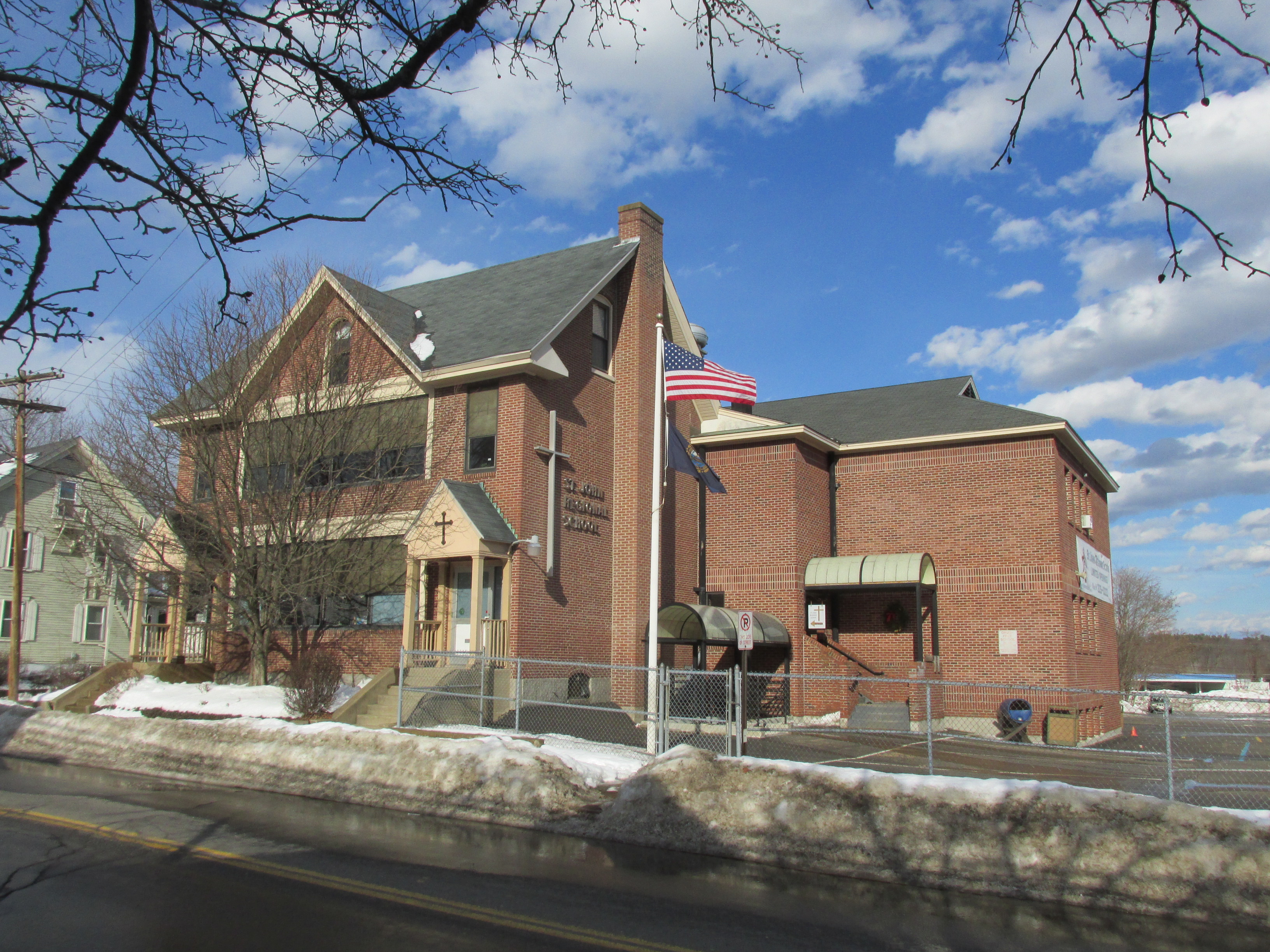
Saint John Regional School

Saint John Regional School is a Roman Catholic primary school in Concord, New Hampshire serving approximately 250 students in prekindergarten through eighth grade.

The school's motto is "fides, caritas, veritas", translated as "faith, charity, truth"
