= Mary Byrd =

Mary Byrd may refer to:

- Mary E. Byrd (1849–1934), American educator
- Mary Willing Byrd (1740–1814), second wife of Colonel William Byrd III

== See also ==
- Marie Byrd Land, Antarctica
  - Marie Byrd Land Volcanic Province
- Mary Bird (disambiguation)
