= Eagle Hotel (Concord, New Hampshire) =

- U.S. National Register of Historic Places
- U.S. Historic district – Contributing property
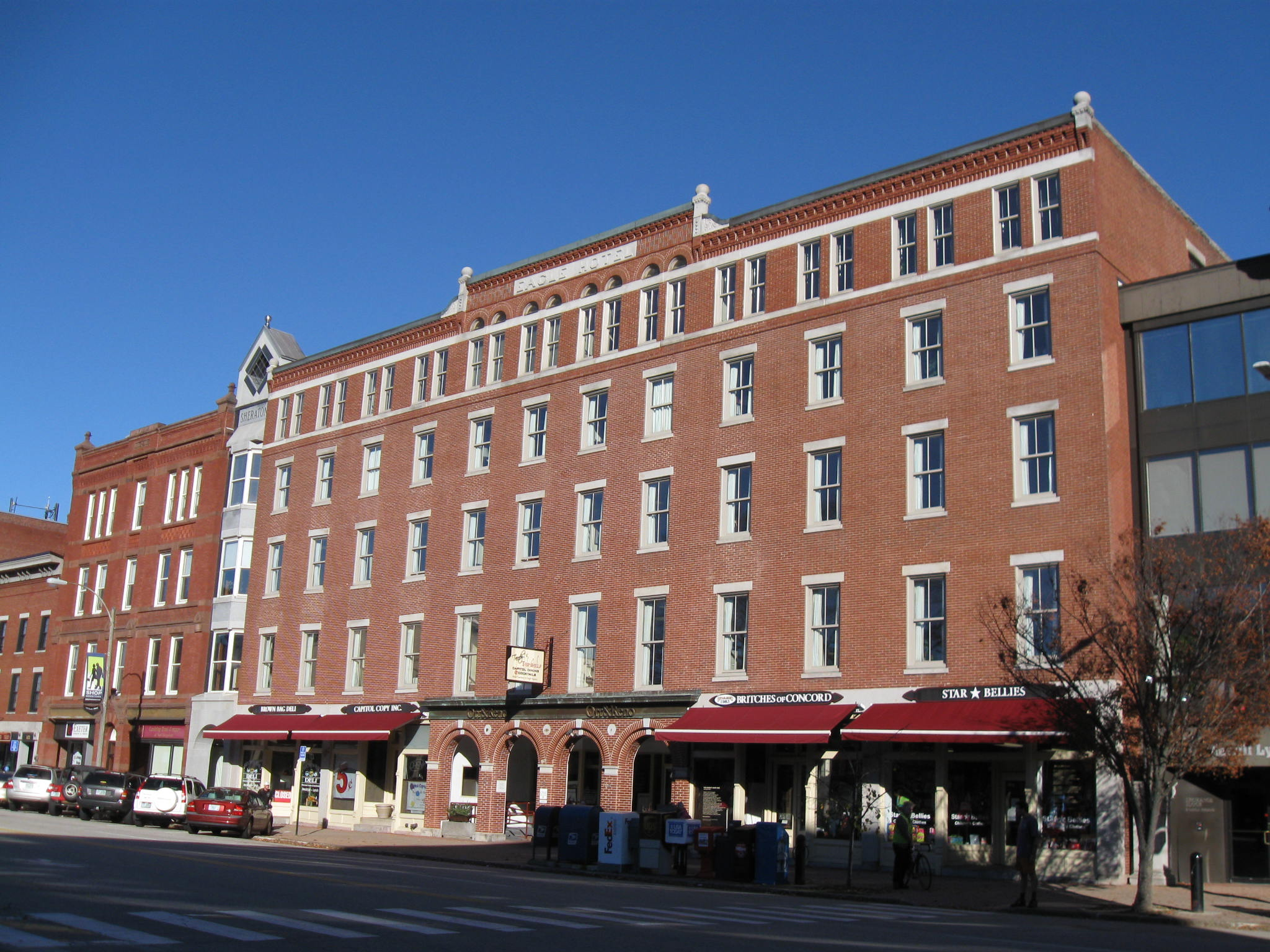

- Location within New Hampshire Location within the United States
- Location: 110 N. Main St., Concord, New Hampshire
- Coordinates: 43°12′25″N 71°32′12″W
- Built: 1827
- Architect: Multiple
- Part of: Downtown Concord Historic District (ID00000652)
- NRHP reference No.: 78000216

Significant dates
- Added to NRHP: September 20, 1978
- Designated CP: June 9, 2000

The Eagle Hotel is a historic hotel building at 110 North Main Street in Concord, New Hampshire. Built in 1851, it has been a prominent local landmark since then, and a meeting place for state politicians, given its location across the street from the New Hampshire State House. The building was listed on the National Register of Historic Places in 1978.

== Description and history ==
The former Eagle Hotel is located on the north side of downtown Concord, on the east side of North Main Street. It is located directly across the street from the New Hampshire State House. It is a five-story masonry structure, with a flat roof and party walls shared with its neighbors. On the ground level, the central four bays have rounded arches leading to the main entrance to the hotel area. The outer bays are taken up by retail storefronts. The second through fourth floors have twelve bays of windows, set in rectangular openings with stone sills and lintels. The fifth floor, separated from the lower floors by a stone stringcourse, has doubled windows in each bay, and is crowned by a parapet.

The oldest portions of this large brick building were built in 1851, on the site of the Eagle Coffee House, which had burned down the year before. As built then, it was four stories in height and twelve bays wide. In 1890, its original gable roof was removed, a fifth floor was built, with a flat roof. At that time the decorative cornice that now adorns the top of the building was added. These alterations were designed by Worcester architect Amos P. Cutting. A place where the politically powerful in the state gathered, it is portrayed in the best-selling novel of 1906, Coniston, as the "Pelican Hotel".

== See also ==
- National Register of Historic Places listings in Merrimack County, New Hampshire
