= Concord School District (New Hampshire) =

Public school district in the United States

Address
- 38 Liberty Street Concord, New Hampshire, 03301; United States

District information
- Type: Public school district
- Grades: PK–12
- Superintendent: Kathleen A. Murphy
- NCES District ID: 3302460

Students and staff
- Enrollment: 4,327 (2020-2021)
- Faculty: 314.6 (on FTE basis)
- Student–teacher ratio: 13.75

Other information
- Website: sau8.org

Concord School District is a public school district located in Concord, New Hampshire, U.S. The district serves about 5,400 students in seven schools.

== Schools ==
=== High schools ===
- Concord High School

=== Middle schools ===
- Rundlett Middle School

=== Elementary schools ===
- Abbot-Downing School
- Beaver Meadow School
- Broken Ground School
- Christa McAuliffe School
- Mill Brook School

== School Board ==
Name		Term Expiration
Jim Richards	President	2022
Barb Higgins	Vice President	2021
Virginia Cannon	Secretary	2022
Roger B. Phillips	Clerk	2021
Patrick Taylor	Deputy Clerk	2021
Clint Cogswell	Treasurer	2021
Jenita Aquino Patzan	Student Rep	2021-2022
