= Concord, New Hampshire =

Capital city of New Hampshire, United States

- State capital city
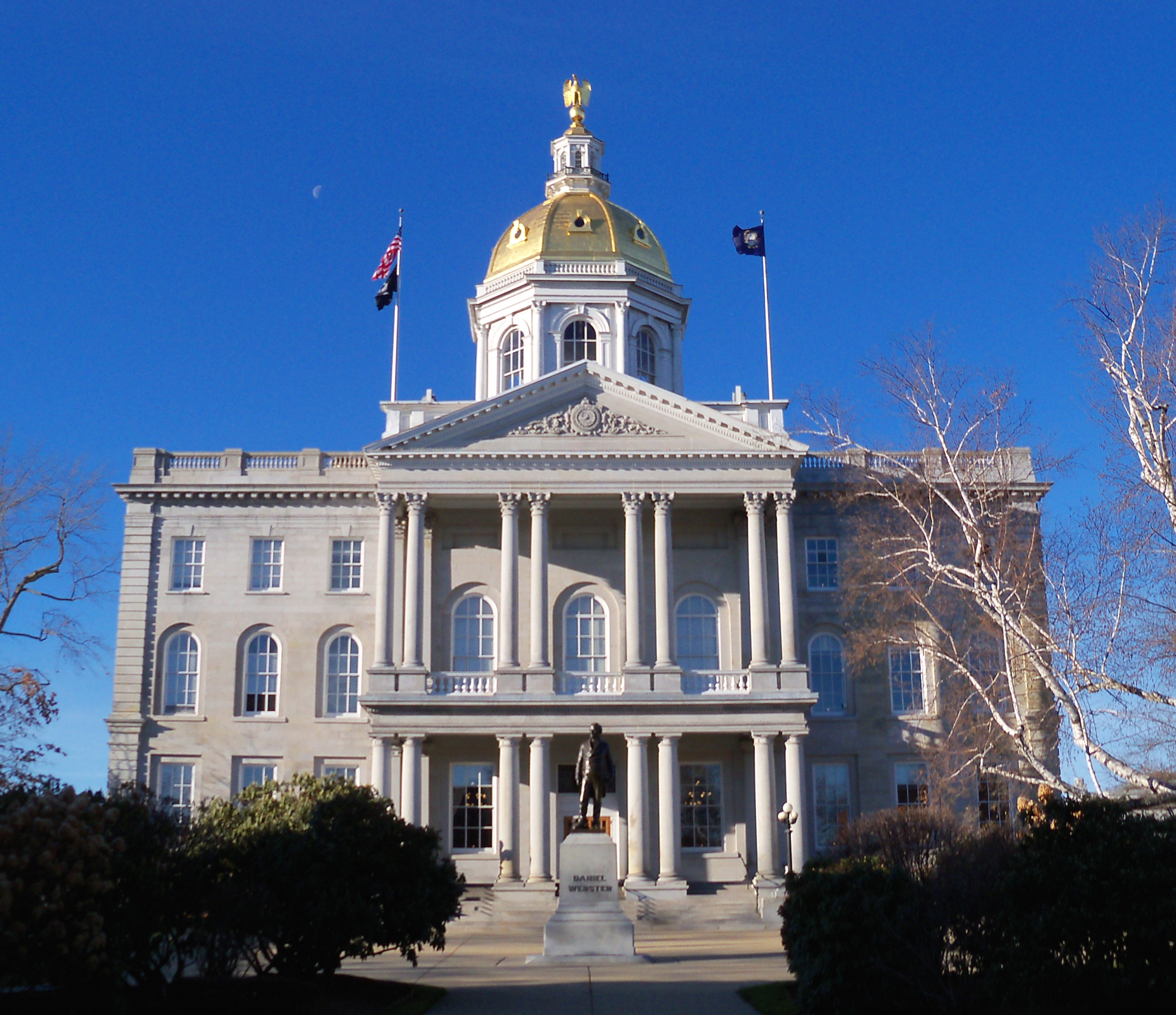
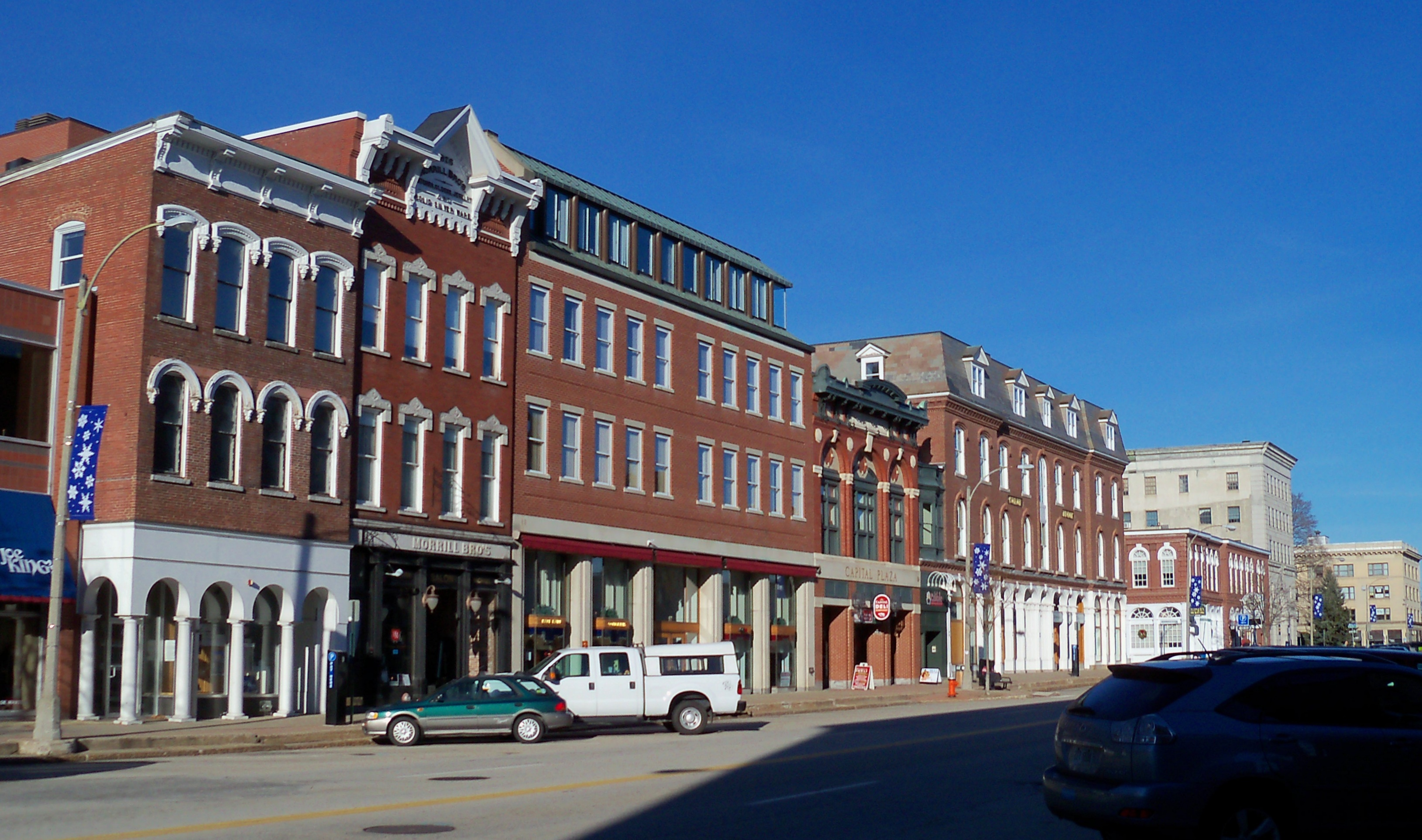
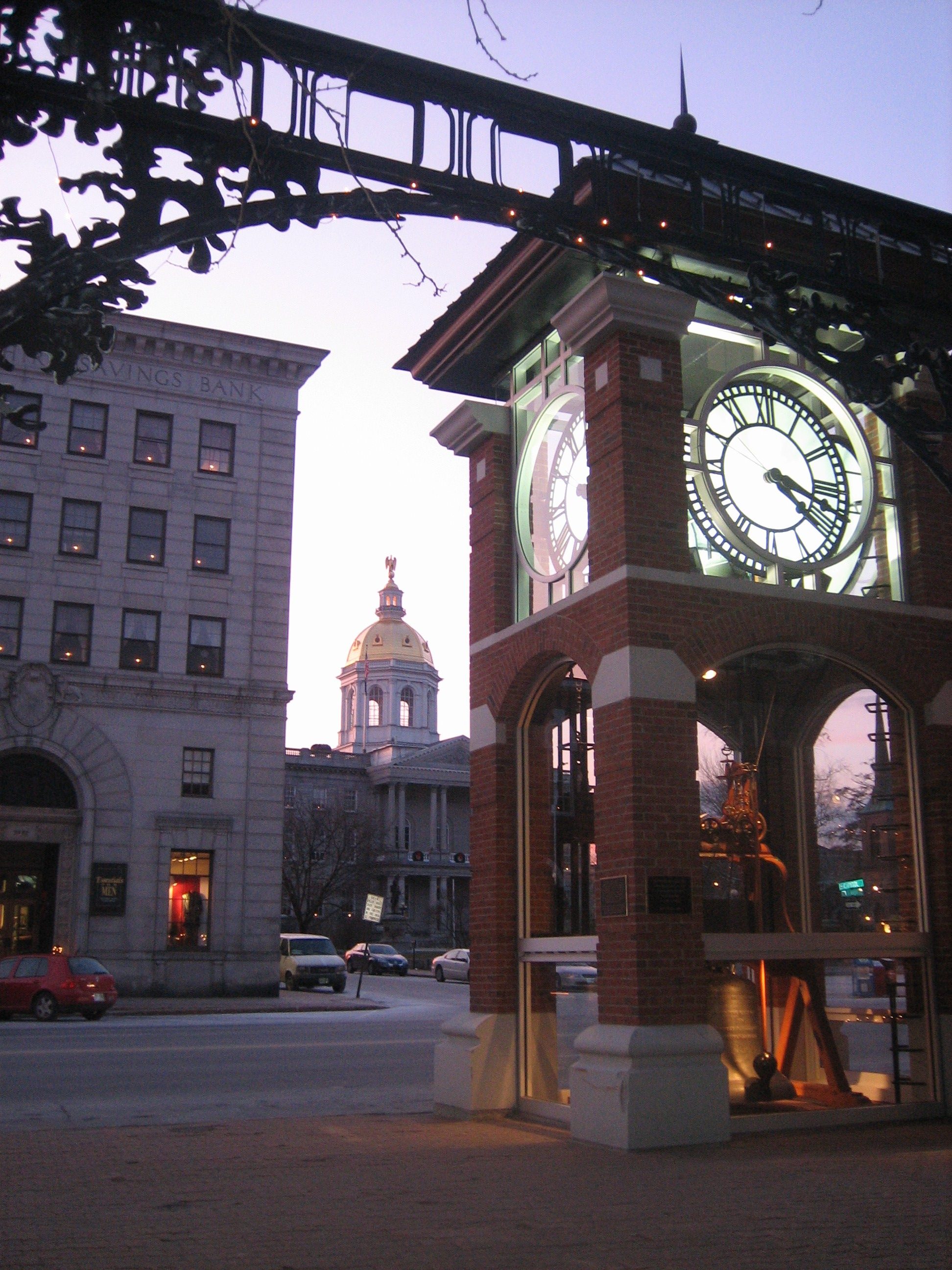
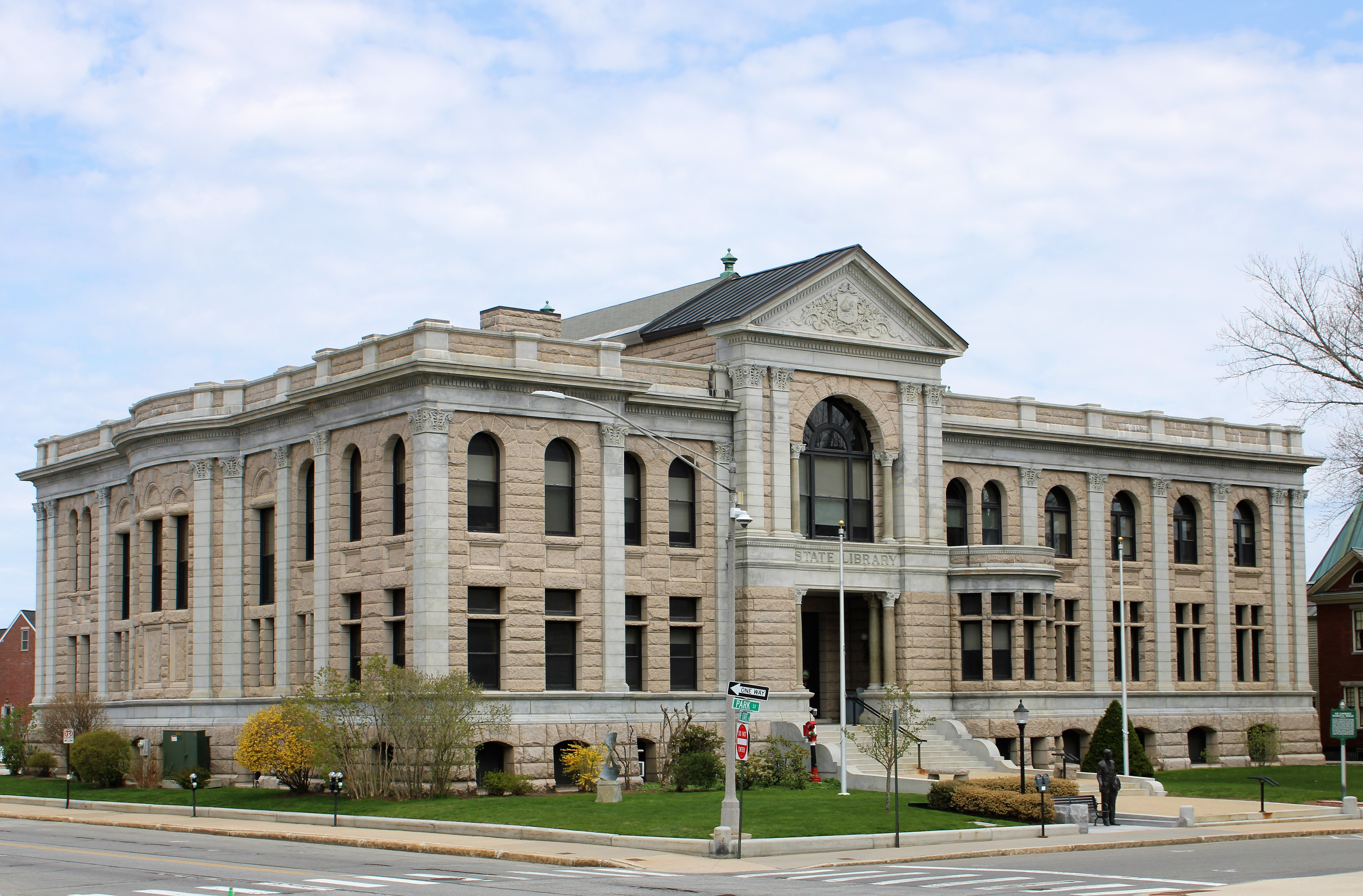
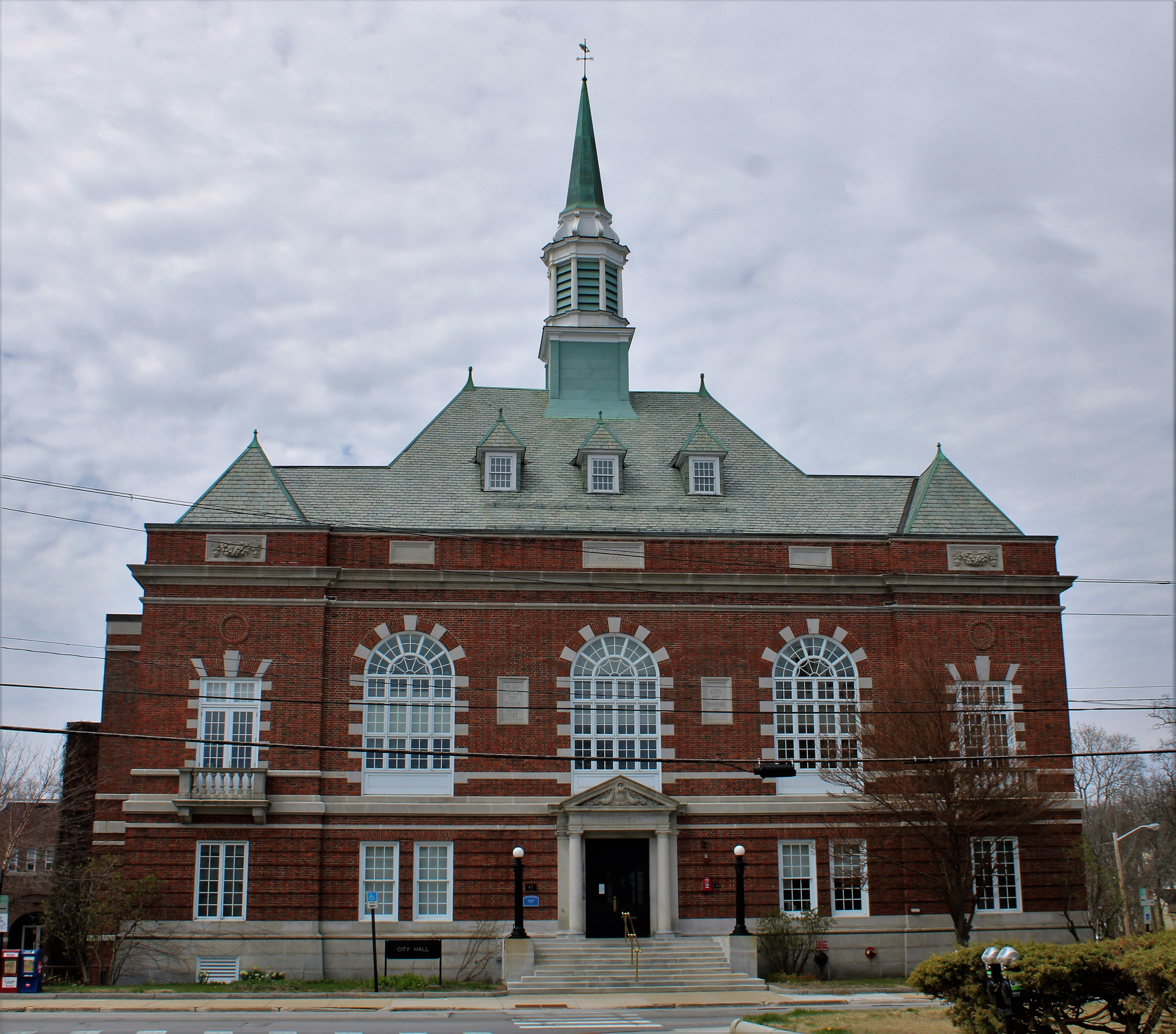
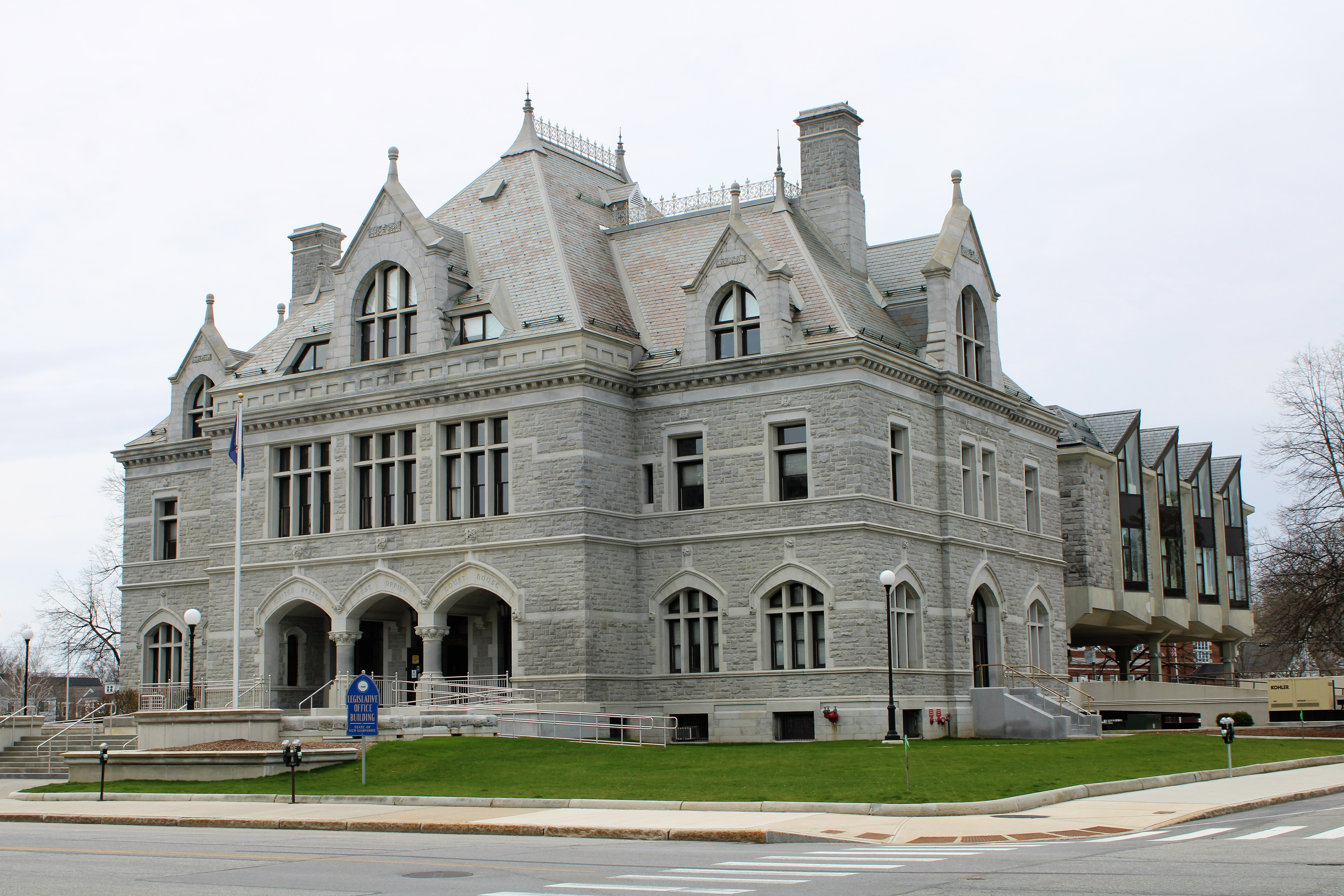
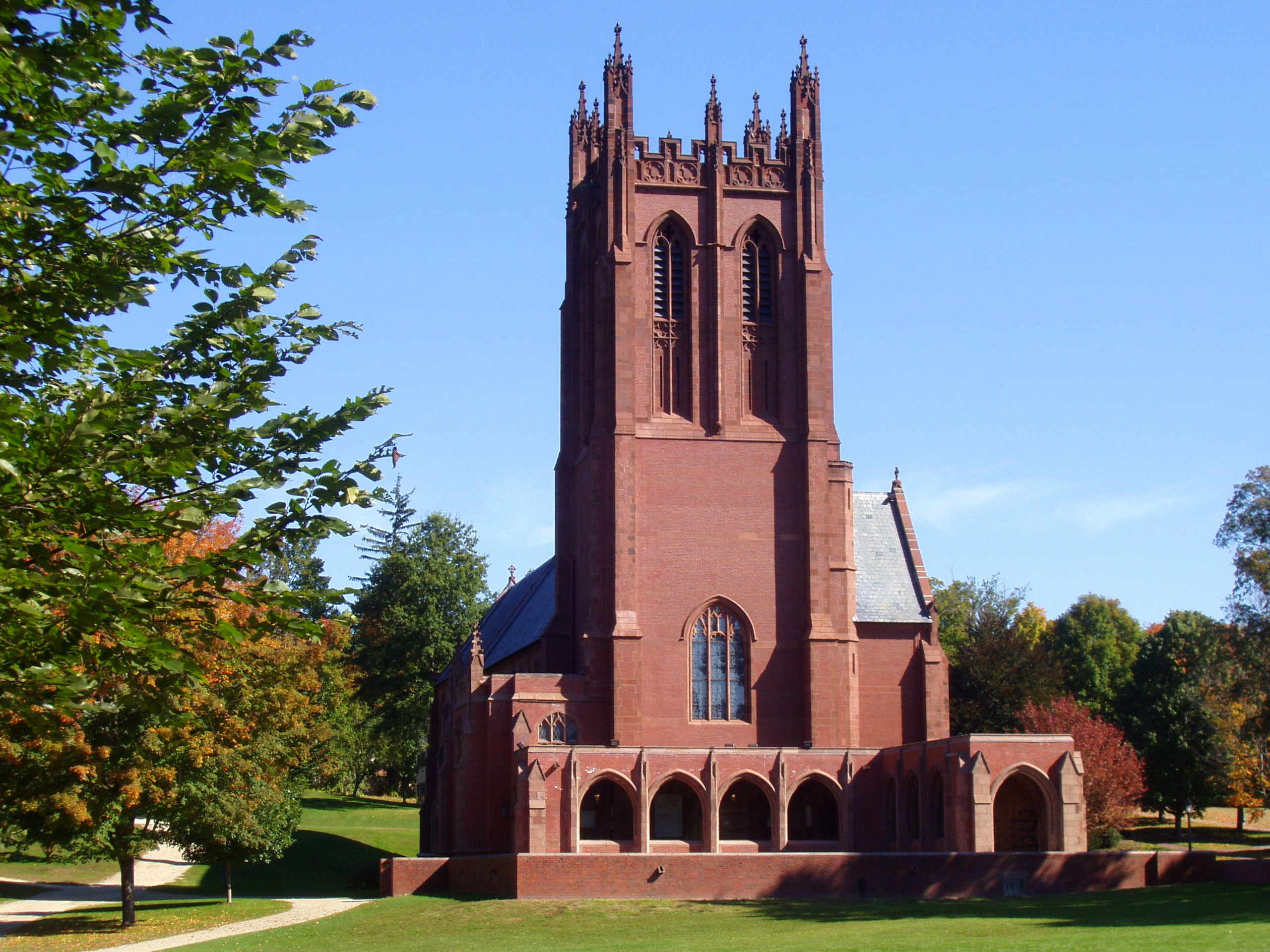
- New Hampshire State House Main Street in Downtown Concord View from Eagle Square New Hampshire State Library City Hall Old Post Office St. Paul's School chapel

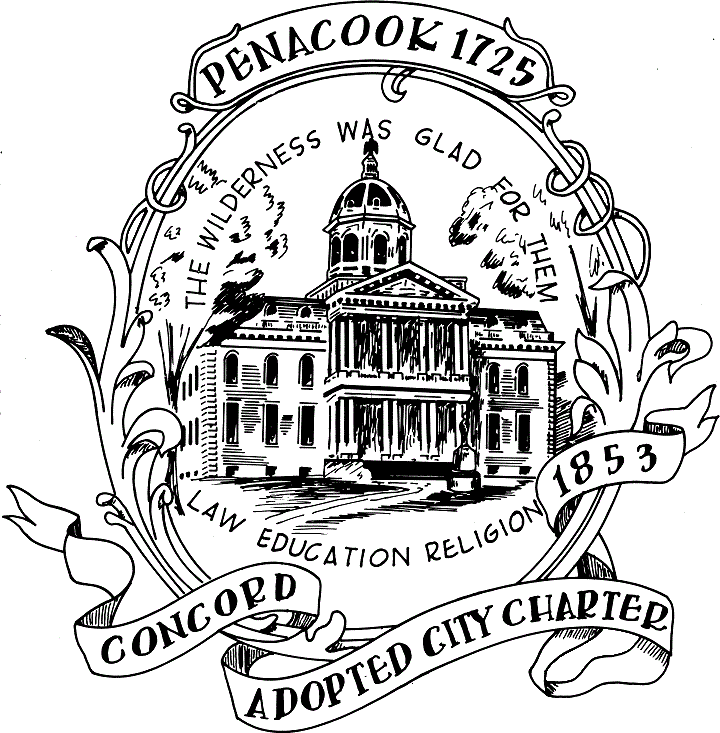
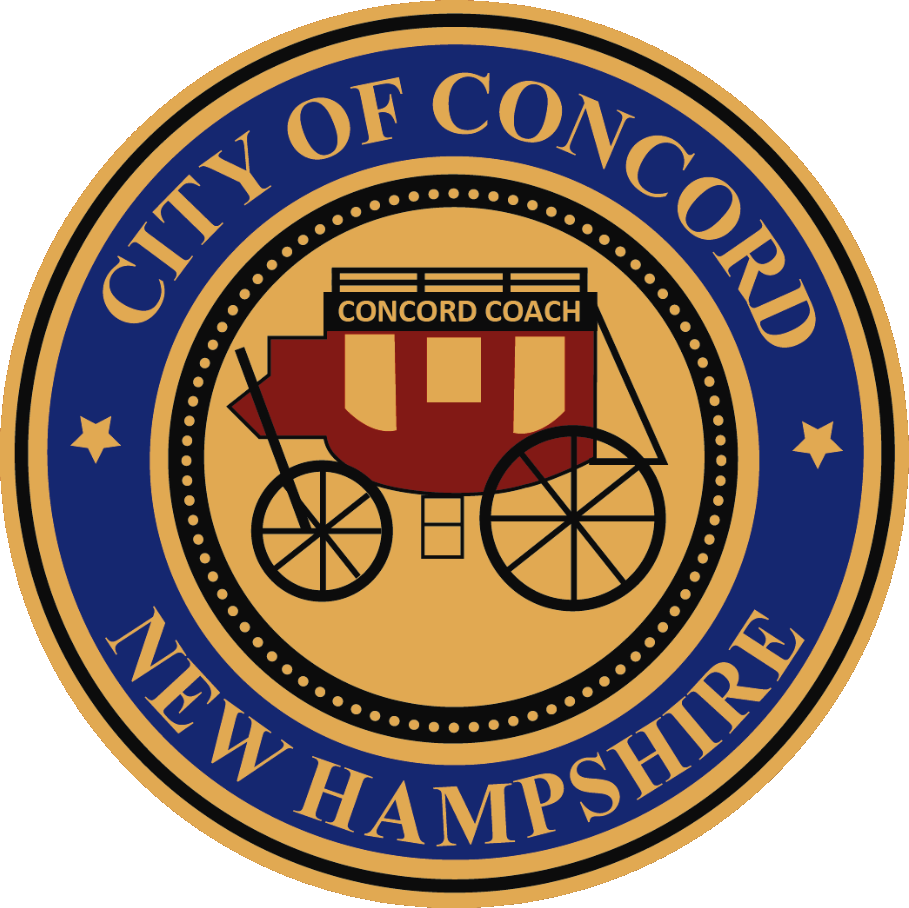
- Flag Seal Logo

- Location in Merrimack County and the state of New Hampshire

- Location in the United States
- Coordinates: 43°12′24″N 71°32′17″W
- Country: United States
- State: New Hampshire
- County: Merrimack
- Region: New England
- Settled: 1659
- Incorporated: 1733

Government
  - Type: Mayor–council
  - Mayor: Byron Champlin
  - City council: Members: Brent Todd; Michele Horne; Jennifer Kretovic; Mark Davie; Stacey Brown; Aislinn Kalob; Jim Schlosser; Ali Sekou; Kris Schultz; Jeff Foote; Nathan Fennessy; Amanda Grady Sexton; Fred Keach; Judith Kurtz
  - City manager: Thomas J. Aspell Jr.

Area
  - Total: 67.19 sq mi (174.02 km^{2})
  - Land: 63.96 sq mi (165.66 km^{2})
  - Water: 3.23 sq mi (8.36 km^{2})
- Elevation: 272 ft (83 m)

Population (2020)
  - Total: 43,976
  - Density: 687.5/sq mi (265.46/km^{2})
  - μSA: 155,238
- Time zone: UTC−05:00 (EST)
  - Summer (DST): UTC−04:00 (EDT)
- ZIP Codes: 03301, 03302, 03303, 03305
- Area code: 603
- FIPS code: 33-14200
- GNIS feature ID: 873303
- Website: www.concordnh.gov

Concord (/ˈkɒŋkərd/) is the capital city of the U.S. state of New Hampshire and the seat of Merrimack County. As of the 2020 United States census the population was 43,976, making it the 3rd most populous city in New Hampshire after Manchester and Nashua.

The area was first settled by Europeans in 1659. On January 17, 1725, the Province of Massachusetts Bay granted the Concord area as the Plantation of Penacook, and it was incorporated on February 9, 1734, as the Town of Rumford. Governor Benning Wentworth gave the city its current name in 1765 following a boundary dispute with the neighboring town of Bow; the name was meant to signify the new harmony between the two towns. In 1808, Concord was named the official seat of state government, and the State House was completed in 1819; it remains the oldest U.S. state capitol wherein the legislature meets in its original chambers.

Concord is entirely within the Merrimack River watershed and the city is centered on the river. The Merrimack runs from northwest to southeast through the city. The city's eastern boundary is formed by the Soucook River, which separates Concord from the town of Pembroke. The Turkey River passes through the southwestern quarter of the city. The city consists of its downtown, including the North End and South End neighborhoods, along with the four villages of Penacook, Concord Heights, East Concord, and West Concord. Penacook sits along the Contoocook River, just before it flows into the Merrimack.

As of 2020, the top employer in the city was the State of New Hampshire, and the largest private employer was Concord Hospital. Concord is home to the University of New Hampshire School of Law, New Hampshire's only law school; St. Paul's School, a private preparatory school; NHTI, a two-year community college; the New Hampshire Police Academy; and the New Hampshire Fire Academy. Concord's Old North Cemetery is the final resting place of Franklin Pierce, 14th President of the United States.

Interstate 89 and Interstate 93 are the two main interstate highways serving the city, and general aviation access is via Concord Municipal Airport. The nearest airport with commercial air service is Manchester–Boston Regional Airport, 23 miles (37 km) to the south. There has been no passenger rail service to Concord since 1981. Historically, the Boston and Maine Railroad served the city.

== History ==
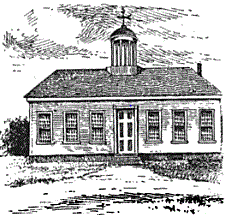
Old Town House, 1790

The area that would become Concord was originally settled thousands of years ago by Abenaki Native Americans called the Pennacook. The tribe fished for migrating salmon, sturgeon, and alewives with nets strung across the rapids of the Merrimack River. The stream was also the transportation route for their birch bark canoes, which could travel from Lake Winnipesaukee to the Atlantic Ocean. The broad sweep of the Merrimack River valley floodplain provided good soil for farming beans, gourds, pumpkins, melons and maize.

The area was first settled by Europeans in 1659 as Penacook, after the Abenaki word "pannukog" meaning "bend in the river," referencing the steep bends of the Merrimack River through the area. On January 17, 1725, the Province of Massachusetts Bay, which then claimed territories west of the Merrimack, granted the Concord area as the Plantation of Penacook. It was settled between 1725 and 1727 by Captain Ebenezer Eastman and others from Haverhill, Massachusetts. On February 9, 1734, the town was incorporated as "Rumford", from which Sir Benjamin Thompson, Count Rumford, would take his title. It was renamed "Concord" in 1765 by Governor Benning Wentworth following a bitter boundary dispute between Rumford and the town of Bow; the city name was meant to reflect the new concord, or harmony, between the disputant towns. Citizens displaced by the resulting border adjustment were given land elsewhere as compensation. In 1779, New Pennacook Plantation was granted to Timothy Walker Jr. and his associates at what would be incorporated in 1800 as Rumford, Maine, the site of Pennacook Falls.

Concord grew in prominence throughout the 18th century, and some of the earliest houses from this period survive at the northern end of Main Street. In the years following the Revolution, Concord's central geographical location made it a logical choice for the state capital, particularly after Samuel Blodget in 1807 opened a canal and lock system to allow vessels passage around the Amoskeag Falls downriver, connecting Concord with Boston by way of the Middlesex Canal. In 1808, Concord was named the official seat of state government, and in 1816 architect Stuart Park was commissioned to design a new capitol building for the state legislature on land sold to the state by local Quakers. Construction on the State House was completed in 1819, and it remains the oldest capitol in the nation in which the state's legislative branches meet in their original chambers. Concord was also named the seat of Merrimack County in 1823, and the Merrimack County Courthouse was constructed in 1857 in the North End at the site of the Old Town House.

In the early 19th century, much of the city's economy was dominated by furniture-making, printing, and granite quarrying; granite had become a popular building material for many monumental halls in the early United States, and Concord granite was used in the construction of both the New Hampshire State House and the Library of Congress in Washington, D.C. In 1828, Lewis Downing joined J. Stephens Abbot to form Abbot and Downing. Their most famous product was their Concord coach, widely used in the development of the American West, and their enterprise largely boosted and changed the city economy in the mid-19th century. In subsequent years, Concord would also become a hub for the railroad industry, with Penacook a textile manufacturing center using water power from the Contoocook River. The city also around this time started to become a center for the emerging healthcare industry, with New Hampshire State Hospital opening in 1842 as one of the first psychiatric hospitals in the United States. The State Hospital continued to expand throughout the following decades, and in 1891 Concord Hospital opened its doors as Margaret Pillsbury General Hospital, the first general hospital in the state of New Hampshire.

Concord's economy changed once again in the 20th century with the declining railroad and textile industry. The city developed into a center for national politics due to New Hampshire's first-in-the-nation primary, and many presidential candidates still visit the Concord area during campaign season. The city also developed an identity within the emerging space industry, with the McAuliffe-Shepard Discovery Center opening in 1990 to commemorate Alan Shepard, the first American in space from nearby Derry, and Christa McAuliffe, a teacher at Concord High School who died in the 1986 Space Shuttle Challenger disaster. Today, Concord remains a center for politics, law, healthcare, and insurance companies.

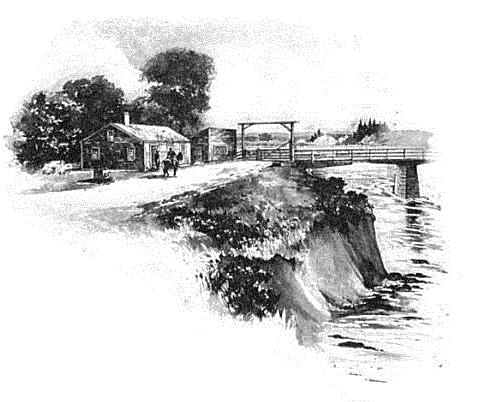
First Concord Bridge, 1795

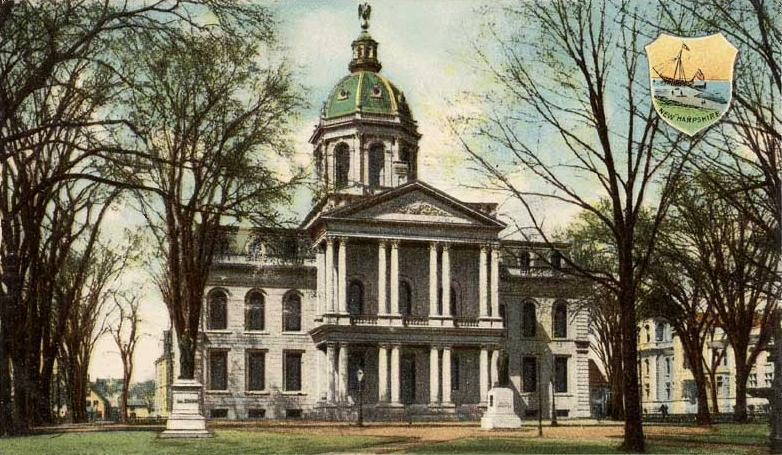
State House c. 1906

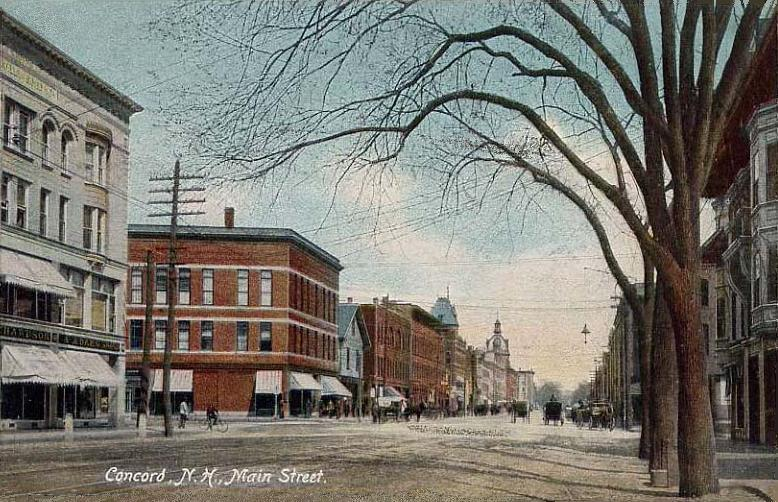
Main Street c. 1908

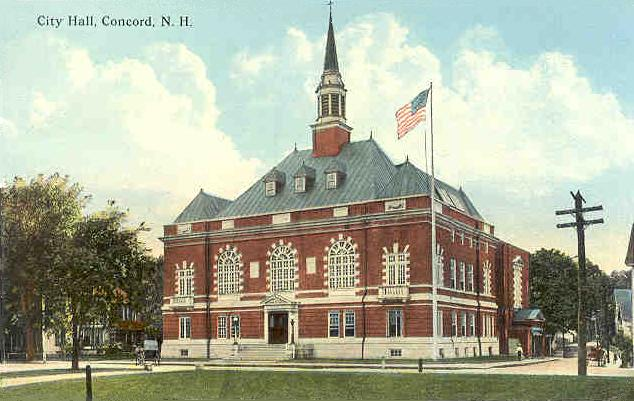
City Hall in 1913

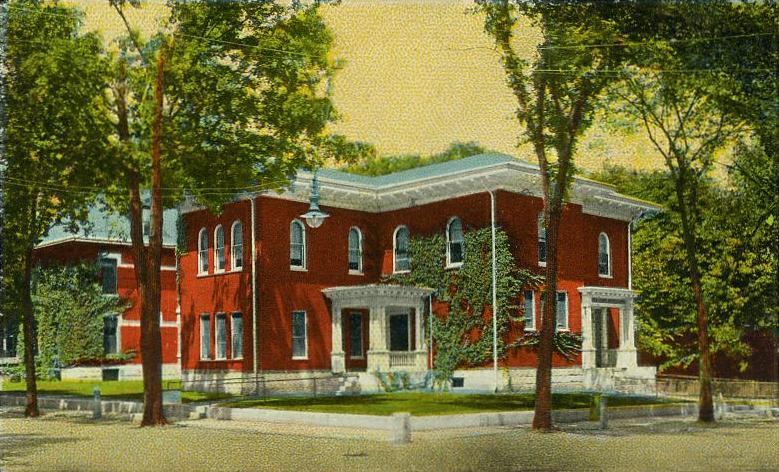
Old Library c. 1915

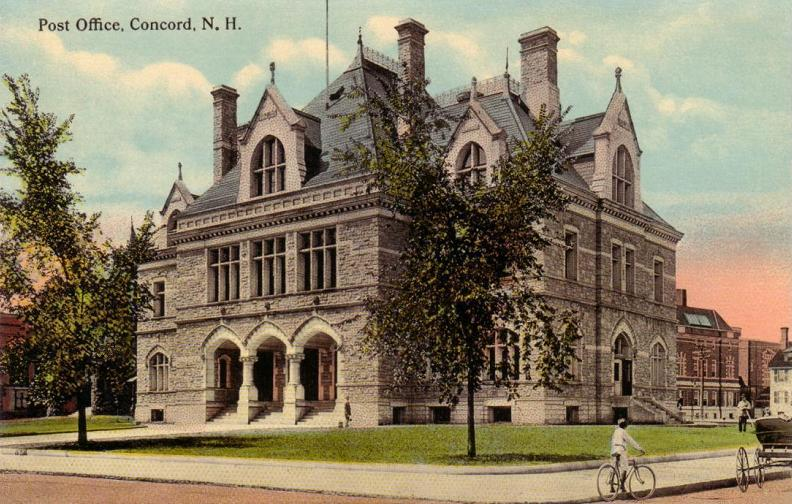
Old Post Office in 1910

== Geography ==
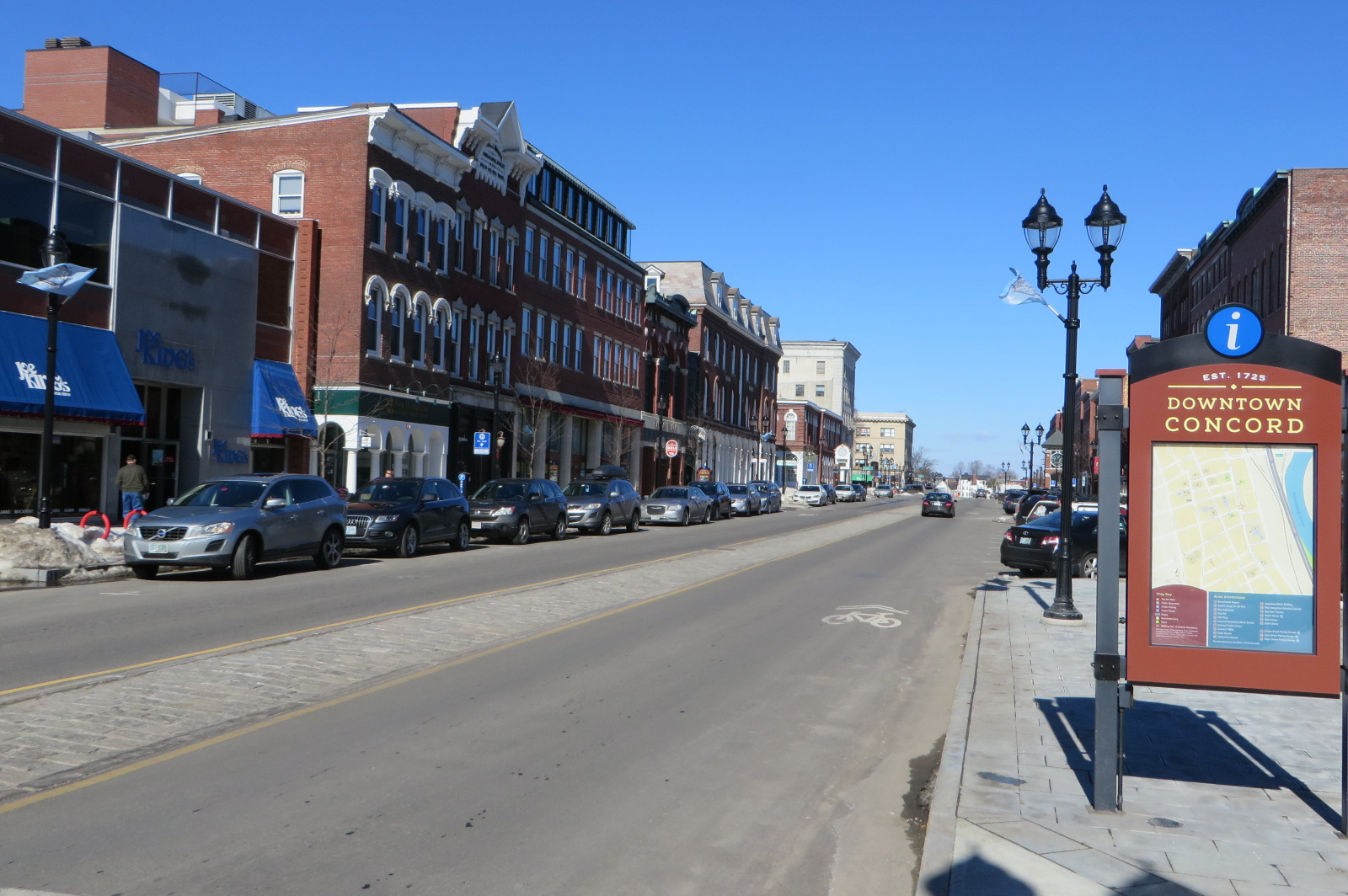
Downtown Concord in 2017

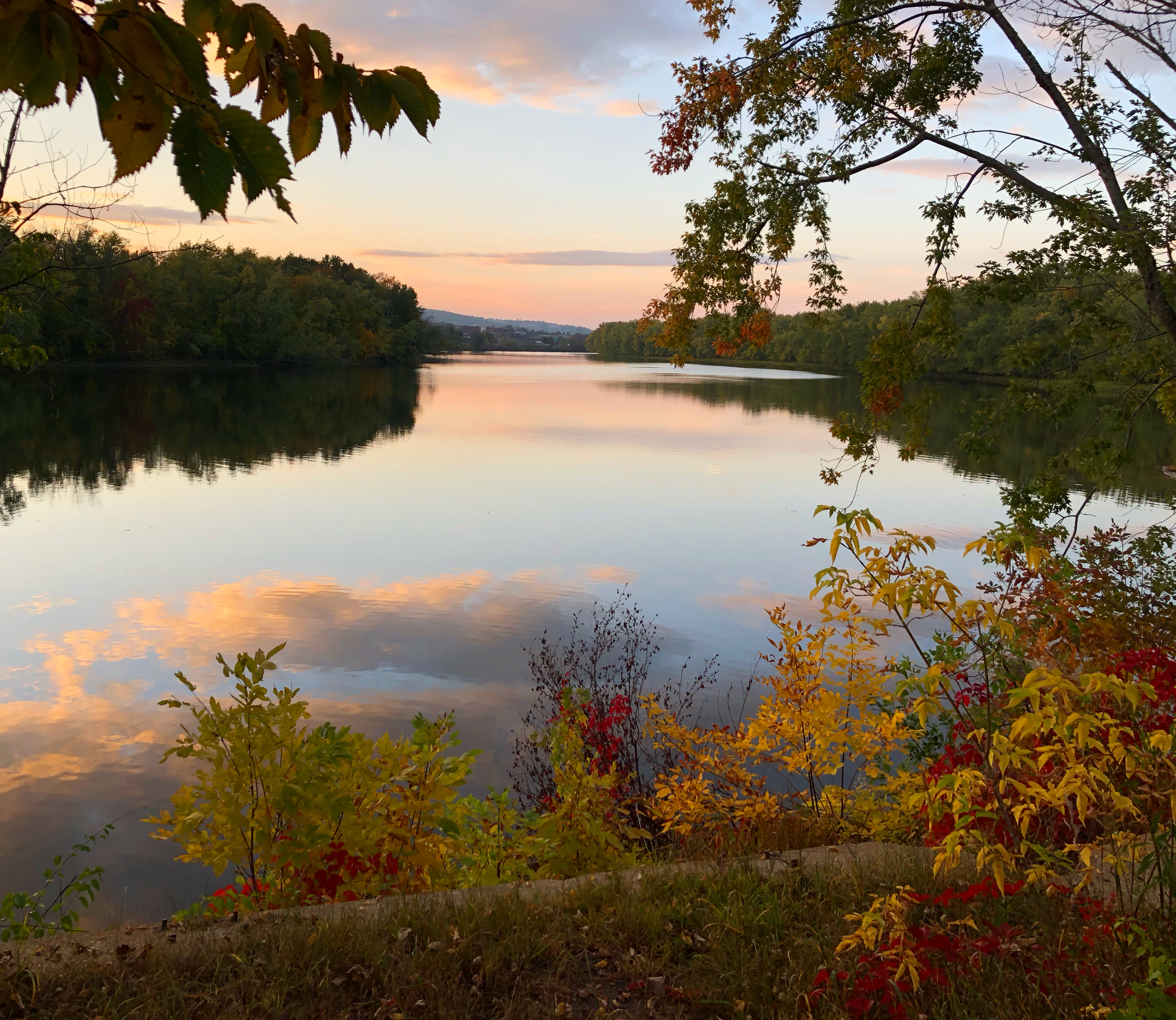
View along the Merrimack River from Terrill Park

Concord is located in south-central New Hampshire. It is 38 miles (61 km) north of the Massachusetts border, 40 miles (64 km) west of the Maine border, 54 miles (87 km) east of the Vermont border, and 170 miles (270 km) south of the Canadian border at Pittsburg.

According to the United States Census Bureau, the city has a total area of 67.2 square miles (174.0 km^{2}). 64.0 square miles (165.7 km^{2}) of it are land and 3.2 square miles (8.4 km^{2}) of it are water, comprising 4.81% of the city. Concord is drained by the Merrimack River. Penacook Lake, the largest lake in the city and its main source of water, is in the west. The highest point in Concord is 860 feet (260 m) above sea level on Oak Hill, just west of the hill's 970-foot (300 m) summit in neighboring Loudon.

Concord lies fully within the Merrimack River watershed and is centered on the river, which runs from northwest to southeast through the city. Downtown is located on a low terrace to the west of the river, with residential neighborhoods climbing hills to the west and extending southwards towards the town of Bow. To the east of the Merrimack, atop a 100-foot (30 m) bluff, is a flat, sandy plain known as Concord Heights, which has seen most of the city's commercial development since 1960. The eastern boundary of Concord (with the town of Pembroke) is formed by the Soucook River, a tributary of the Merrimack. The Turkey River winds through the southwestern quarter of the city, passing through the campus of St. Paul's School before entering the Merrimack River in Bow. In the northern part of the city, the Contoocook River enters the Merrimack at the village of Penacook.

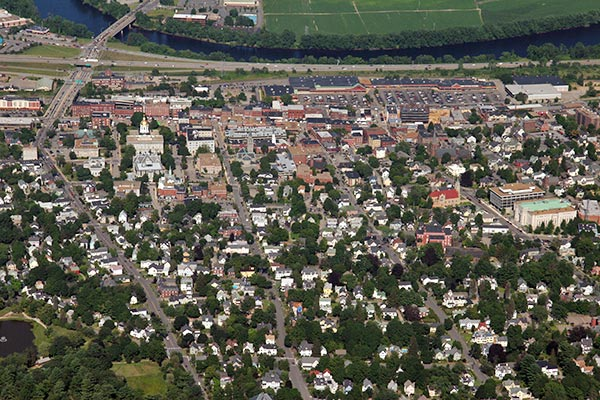
Aerial view of downtown Concord (looking east)

Concord is 16 miles (26 km) north of Manchester, New Hampshire's largest city, and 66 miles (106 km) north of Boston.

=== Villages ===
The city of Concord is made up of its downtown, including its North End and South End neighborhoods, plus the four distinct villages of Penacook, Concord Heights, East Concord, and West Concord.

=== Adjacent municipalities ===
- Canterbury (north)
- Loudon (northeast)
- Pembroke (southeast)
- Bow (south)
- Hopkinton (west)
- Webster (northwest)
- Boscawen (north-northwest)

=== Climate ===
Climate chart for Concord

Concord, as with much of New England, is within the humid continental climate zone (Köppen Dfb), with long, cold, snowy winters, warm (and at times humid) summers, and relatively brief autumns and springs. In winter, successive storms deliver moderate to at times heavy snowfall amounts, contributing to the relatively reliable snow cover. In addition, lows reach below 0 °F (−18 °C) on an average 15 nights per year, and the city straddles the border between USDA Hardiness Zone 5b and 6a. However, thaws are frequent, with one to three days per month with 50 °F (10 °C)+ highs from December to February. Summer can bring stretches of humid conditions as well as thunderstorms, and there is an average of 12 days of 90 °F (32 °C)+ highs annually. The window for freezing temperatures on average begins on September 27 and expires on May 14.

The monthly daily average temperature range from 20.6 °F (−6.3 °C) in January to 70.0 °F (21.1 °C) in July. Temperature extremes have ranged from −37 °F (−38 °C) in February 1943 to 102 °F (39 °C) in July 1966.

Climate data for Concord Municipal Airport, New Hampshire (1991−2020 normals, (Note: Mean monthly maxima and minima (i.e. the expected highest and lowest temperature readings at any point during the year or given month) calculated based on data at said location from 1991 to 2020.) extremes 1868–present) (Note: Official records for Concord were kept at downtown from September 1868 to April 1941 and at Concord Municipal Airport since May 1941; snow records date from December 1942. For more information, see ThreadEx)
Month	Jan	Feb	Mar	Apr	May	Jun	Jul	Aug	Sep	Oct	Nov	Dec	Year
Record high °F (°C)	72 (22)	74 (23)	89 (32)	95 (35)	98 (37)	101 (38)	102 (39)	101 (38)	98 (37)	92 (33)	80 (27)	73 (23)	102 (39)
Mean maximum °F (°C)	52.4 (11.3)	54.3 (12.4)	65.6 (18.7)	81.6 (27.6)	89.6 (32.0)	92.8 (33.8)	93.8 (34.3)	92.4 (33.6)	89.0 (31.7)	79.0 (26.1)	68.6 (20.3)	56.9 (13.8)	96.1 (35.6)
Mean daily maximum °F (°C)	31.6 (−0.2)	34.8 (1.6)	43.6 (6.4)	57.5 (14.2)	69.3 (20.7)	77.8 (25.4)	83.0 (28.3)	81.7 (27.6)	73.7 (23.2)	60.9 (16.1)	48.4 (9.1)	37.1 (2.8)	58.3 (14.6)
Daily mean °F (°C)	22.3 (−5.4)	24.7 (−4.1)	33.4 (0.8)	45.4 (7.4)	56.7 (13.7)	65.8 (18.8)	71.1 (21.7)	69.5 (20.8)	61.4 (16.3)	49.3 (9.6)	38.6 (3.7)	28.3 (−2.1)	47.2 (8.4)
Mean daily minimum °F (°C)	12.9 (−10.6)	14.7 (−9.6)	23.3 (−4.8)	33.3 (0.7)	44.1 (6.7)	53.7 (12.1)	59.2 (15.1)	57.2 (14.0)	49.0 (9.4)	37.8 (3.2)	28.7 (−1.8)	19.5 (−6.9)	36.1 (2.3)
Mean minimum °F (°C)	−9.2 (−22.9)	−7.2 (−21.8)	1.6 (−16.9)	19.2 (−7.1)	29.2 (−1.6)	39.0 (3.9)	47.1 (8.4)	44.1 (6.7)	32.1 (0.1)	22.1 (−5.5)	11.8 (−11.2)	−0.9 (−18.3)	−12.4 (−24.7)
Record low °F (°C)	−35 (−37)	−37 (−38)	−20 (−29)	4 (−16)	21 (−6)	26 (−3)	33 (1)	29 (−2)	20 (−7)	10 (−12)	−17 (−27)	−24 (−31)	−37 (−38)
Average precipitation inches (mm)	2.80 (71)	2.75 (70)	3.28 (83)	3.43 (87)	3.47 (88)	3.77 (96)	3.62 (92)	3.63 (92)	3.63 (92)	4.43 (113)	3.44 (87)	3.70 (94)	41.95 (1,066)
Average snowfall inches (cm)	17.1 (43)	16.9 (43)	13.6 (35)	2.5 (6.4)	0.0 (0.0)	0.0 (0.0)	0.0 (0.0)	0.0 (0.0)	0.0 (0.0)	0.8 (2.0)	2.5 (6.4)	14.3 (36)	67.7 (172)
Average extreme snow depth inches (cm)	11.9 (30)	15.3 (39)	13.9 (35)	4.0 (10)	0.0 (0.0)	0.0 (0.0)	0.0 (0.0)	0.0 (0.0)	0.0 (0.0)	0.6 (1.5)	2.0 (5.1)	9.1 (23)	19.8 (50)
Average precipitation days (≥ 0.01 in)	11.2	10.0	11.5	11.4	12.4	12.8	10.9	9.9	9.3	10.6	10.8	12.0	132.8
Average snowy days (≥ 0.1 in)	8.1	7.6	5.2	1.3	0.0	0.0	0.0	0.0	0.0	0.2	1.6	6.3	30.3
Average relative humidity (%)	67.9	66.0	64.8	62.0	65.0	70.9	71.8	74.5	76.3	72.8	73.3	72.3	69.8
Average dew point °F (°C)	10.2 (−12.1)	12.0 (−11.1)	20.8 (−6.2)	29.8 (−1.2)	42.1 (5.6)	53.8 (12.1)	58.8 (14.9)	57.9 (14.4)	50.5 (10.3)	38.3 (3.5)	28.8 (−1.8)	16.7 (−8.5)	35.0 (1.7)
Mean monthly sunshine hours	162.8	171.8	210.5	223.2	258.4	274.3	295.8	261.9	214.7	183.4	127.8	134.8	2,519.4
Percentage possible sunshine	56	58	57	56	57	60	64	61	57	54	44	48	56
Average ultraviolet index	1	2	4	5	7	8	8	7	6	3	2	1	5
Source 1: NOAA (relative humidity , dew points and sun 1961–1990)
Source 2: Weather Atlas (UV)

== Demographics ==
Historical population
Year	Pop.	±%
1767	752	—
1775	1,052	+39.9%
1786	1,402	+33.3%
1790	1,747	+24.6%
1800	2,052	+17.5%
1810	2,393	+16.6%
1820	2,838	+18.6%
1830	3,720	+31.1%
1840	4,897	+31.6%
1850	8,576	+75.1%
1860	10,896	+27.1%
1870	12,241	+12.3%
1880	13,843	+13.1%
1890	17,004	+22.8%
1900	19,632	+15.5%
1910	21,497	+9.5%
1920	22,167	+3.1%
1930	25,228	+13.8%
1940	27,171	+7.7%
1950	27,988	+3.0%
1960	28,991	+3.6%
1970	30,022	+3.6%
1980	30,400	+1.3%
1990	36,006	+18.4%
2000	40,687	+13.0%
2010	42,695	+4.9%
2020	43,976	+3.0%
2024	44,674	+1.6%
Source: U.S. Decennial Census; Population estimate U.S. Decennial Census 1767-1786: NH Provincial & State Papers

=== Racial and ethnic composition ===
Concord city, New Hampshire – Racial composition Note: the US Census treats Hispanic/Latino as an ethnic category. This table excludes Latinos from the racial categories and assigns them to a separate category. Hispanics/Latinos may be of any race.
Race (NH = Non-Hispanic)	% 2020	% 2010	% 2000	Pop 2020	Pop 2010	Pop 2000
White alone (NH)	84.5%	90.5%	94.6%	37,155	38,630	38,484
Black alone (NH)	3.7%	2.1%	1%	1,625	917	398
American Indian alone (NH)	0.3%	0.3%	0.3%	116	118	117
Asian alone (NH)	4.1%	3.4%	1.5%	1,784	1,445	594
Pacific Islander alone (NH)	0%	0%	0%	12	8	13
Other race alone (NH)	0.5%	0.1%	0.1%	199	37	34
Multiracial (NH)	3.9%	1.6%	1.1%	1,709	662	456
Hispanic/Latino (any race)	3.1%	2.1%	1.5%	1,376	878	591

=== 2020 census ===
As of the 2020 census, Concord had a population of 43,976 and a population density of 687.7 people per square mile (265.5 people/km^{2}). The median age was 42.4 years. 17.2% of residents were under the age of 18 and 19.1% of residents were 65 years of age or older. For every 100 females there were 100.9 males, and for every 100 females age 18 and over there were 100.0 males age 18 and over.

90.3% of residents lived in urban areas, while 9.7% lived in rural areas.

There were 18,161 households in Concord, of which 23.9% had children under the age of 18 living in them. Of all households, 40.2% were married-couple households, 19.6% were households with a male householder and no spouse or partner present, and 31.6% were households with a female householder and no spouse or partner present. About 35.1% of all households were made up of individuals and 14.7% had someone living alone who was 65 years of age or older.

There were 19,085 housing units, of which 4.8% were vacant. The homeowner vacancy rate was 1.0% and the rental vacancy rate was 4.2%.

Racial composition as of the 2020 census
Race	Number	Percent
White	37,552	85.4%
Black or African American	1,677	3.8%
American Indian and Alaska Native	141	0.3%
Asian	1,786	4.1%
Native Hawaiian and Other Pacific Islander	15	0.0%
Some other race	523	1.2%
Two or more races	2,282	5.2%
Hispanic or Latino (of any race)	1,376	3.1%

The most reported ancestries in the 2020 census were:

- English (22.5%)
- Irish (20.1%)
- French (10.8%)
- German (9.1%)
- Italian (7.5%)
- Scottish (5.9%)
- French Canadian (3.2%)
- Polish (2.8%)
- African American (2.3%)
- Swedish (1.7%)

=== 2010 census ===
At the 2010 census there were 42,695 residents and 10,052 families in the city, as well as 18,852 housing units at an average density of 293.2 per square mile (113.2/km^{2}).

In 2010 there were 17,592 households, out of which 28.7% had children under the age of 18 living with them, 41.3% were headed by married couples living together, 11.6% had a female householder with no husband present, and 42.9% were non-families. 33.6% of all households were made up of individuals, and 12.0% were someone living alone who was 65 years of age or older. The average household size was 2.26, and the average family size was 2.90.

In the city, the population was spread out, with 20.7% under the age of 18, 9.3% from 18 to 24, 28.0% from 25 to 44, 28.2% from 45 to 64, and 13.8% who were 65 years of age or older. The median age was 39.4 years. For every 100 females, there were 98.5 males. For every 100 females age 18 and over, there were 96.9 males.

=== 2019–2023 ACS estimates ===
For the period 2019–2023, the median annual income for a household in the city was $83,701. The per capita income for the city was $45,420. About 8.7% of those in Concord were below the poverty line during 2019–2023.

== Economy ==
=== Top employers ===
In 2020, the top employer in the city remained the State of New Hampshire, with over 6,000 employed workers, while the largest private employer was Concord Hospital, with just under 3,000 employees. According to the City of Concord's Comprehensive Annual Financial Report, the top 10 employers in the city for the Fiscal Year 2020 were:

#	Employer	Employees
1	State of New Hampshire	6,069
2	Capital Region Health Care – Concord Hospital	2,998
3	Concord School District	809
4	City of Concord	556
5	Lincoln Financial Group	405
6	Market Basket	405
7	Genesis HealthCare	385
8	NHHEAF Network Organizations	332
9	St. Paul's School	330
10	Merrimack Valley School District	328

== Transportation ==
=== Highways ===
Interstate 89 and Interstate 93 are the two main interstate highways serving Concord, and join just south of the city limits. Interstate 89 links Concord with Lebanon and the state of Vermont to the northwest, while Interstate 93 connects the city to Plymouth, Littleton, and the White Mountains to the north and Manchester and Boston to the south. Interstate 393 is a spur highway leading east from Concord and merging with U.S. Route 4 as a direct route to New Hampshire's Seacoast region. North-south U.S. Route 3 serves as Concord's Main Street, while U.S. Route 202 and New Hampshire Route 9 cross the city from east to west. State routes 13 and 132 also serve the city: Route 13 leads southwest out of Concord towards Goffstown and Milford, while Route 132 travels north parallel to Interstate 93. New Hampshire Route 106 passes through the easternmost part of Concord, crossing I-393 and NH 9 before crossing the Soucook River south into the town of Pembroke. To the north, NH 106 leads to Loudon, Belmont and Laconia.

=== Railroads ===
Historically, Concord served as an important railroad terminal and station for the Boston and Maine Railroad. The former Concord Station was located at what is now a Burlington department store on Storrs Street. The station itself was built in 1860, but the fourth and most famous iteration of the station was built in 1885, which had a brick head house designed by Bradford L. Gilbert. The head house was demolished in 1959 and replaced by a smaller "McGinnis Era" station. By 1967, all passenger rail services to Concord had been discontinued. For 13 months in 1980 and 1981, MBTA Commuter Rail ran two round trips a day between Boston and Concord. Since then, there has not been any passenger rail service to Concord.

In 2021, Amtrak announced their plan to implement new service between Boston and Concord by 2035.

=== Bus ===
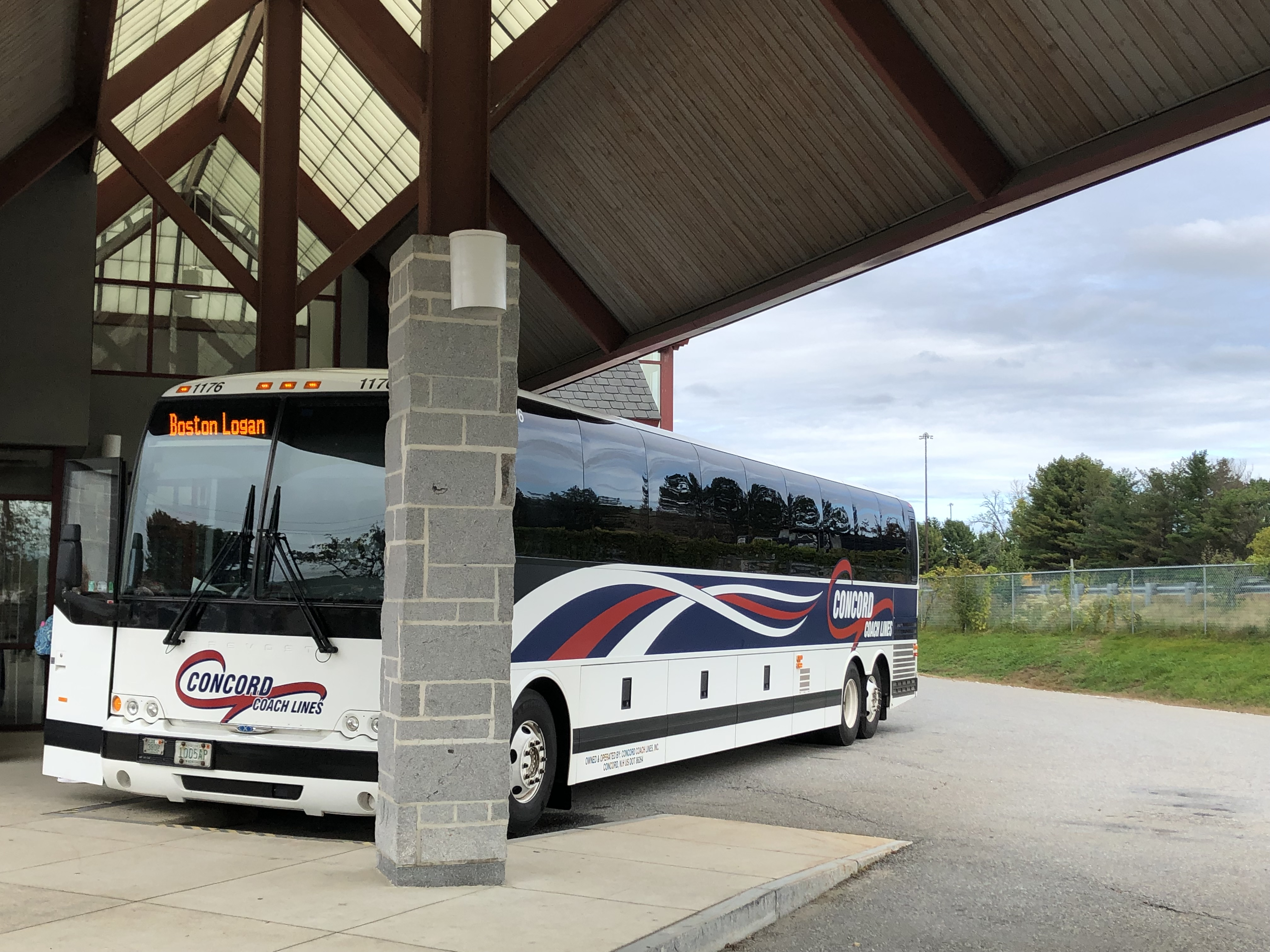
Concord Coach Lines bus at Concord bus station

Local bus service is provided by Concord Area Transit (CAT), with three routes through the city. Regional bus service provided by Concord Coach Lines and Greyhound Lines is available from the Concord Transportation Center at 30 Stickney Avenue next to Exit 14 on Interstate 93, with service south to Boston and points in between, as well as north to Littleton and northeast to Berlin.

=== Aviation and Air Transport ===
General aviation services are available through Concord Municipal Airport, located 2 miles (3 km) east of downtown. There is no commercial air service within the city limits; the nearest such airport is Manchester–Boston Regional Airport, 23 miles (37 km) to the south.

=== Complete Streets Improvement Project ===
Concord's downtown underwent a significant renovation between 2015 and 2016, during the city's "Complete Streets Improvement Project". At a proposed cost of $12 million, the project promised to deliver on categories of maintenance to aging infrastructure, improved accessibility, increased sustainability, a safer experience for walkers, bikers and motorists alike, and to stimulate economic growth in an increasingly idle downtown. The main infrastructural change was reducing the four-lane street (two in each direction) to two lanes plus a turning lane in the center. The freed-up space would contribute to extra width for bikes to ride in either direction, increased curb size and an added median where there is no need for a turning lane. Concord opted to add shared lane markings for bikes, rather than a dedicated protected bike lane.

By adding curb space, this project created new opportunities for pedestrians to enjoy the downtown. Many power lines were buried, and street trees, colorful benches, art installations, and other green spaces were added, all allowing people to reclaim a space long dominated by cars. Main Street underwent serious traffic calming, including a road diet, increased diagonal parking, widening sidewalks, adding shared lane markings, adding trees, texturing medians and coloring crosswalks red. Another aspect of the new construction was adding heated sidewalk capabilities, utilizing excess steam from the local Concord Steam plant, and minimizing sand and snow blowing needed during the winter months.

Funding for Complete Streets came from a combination of $4,710,000 from a USDOT TIGER grant and the rest from the City of Concord. The project was initially proposed as costing $7,850,000, but ran over budget due to overambitious ideas. After scrapping some of the most expensive offenders, the budget ended up at $14.2 million, with the project actually coming in $1.1 million below that. Although adding final aesthetic touches with the extra money were debated, the city council ended up deciding to save for financially straining years ahead. The design was carried out by McFarland Johnson, IBI Group, and City of Concord Engineering.

== Government ==
Concord city vote by party in presidential elections
Year	Democratic	Republican	Third Parties
2024	63.00% 15,216	35.90% 8,670	1.11% 267
2020	64.99% 15,511	33.45% 7,983	1.57% 374
2016	58.09% 12,984	34.95% 7,812	6.95% 1,554
2012	65.07% 14,218	33.52% 7,325	1.41% 309
2008	64.81% 14,302	33.97% 7,496	1.23% 271
2004	60.16% 12,675	38.97% 8,210	0.87% 183
2000	56.25% 10,025	39.17% 6,981	4.58% 817
1996	60.03% 9,719	31.39% 5,082	8.58% 1,389
1992	49.19% 8,325	33.39% 5,651	17.41% 2,947
1988	46.95% 6,698	52.15% 7,439	0.90% 128
1984	41.69% 5,172	57.96% 7,190	0.35% 43
1980	33.92% 4,330	47.72% 6,092	18.36% 2,343
1976	43.62% 5,256	54.99% 6,627	1.39% 168
1972	35.76% 4,554	63.46% 8,082	0.78% 99
1968	40.55% 4,975	56.73% 6,960	2.71% 333
1964	64.27% 8,042	35.73% 4,470	0.00% 0
1960	40.21% 5,473	59.79% 8,137	0.00% 0

Concord city election results from state and federal races
Year	Office	Results
2010	Senator	Hodes 50–47%
2010	House	Kuster 59–38%
2010	Governor	Lynch 67–30%
2012	President	Obama 65-34%
2012	House	Kuster 60–36%
2012	Governor	Hassan 67–30%
2014	Senator	Shaheen 67–33%
2014	House	Kuster 66–33%
2014	Governor	Hassan 68–32%
2016	President	Clinton 59–36%
2016	Senator	Hassan 60–37%
2016	House	Kuster 61–35%
2016	Governor	Van Ostern 61–36%
2018	House	Kuster 67–31%
2018	Governor	Kelly 58–41%
2020	President	Biden 65–32%
2020	Senator	Shaheen 70–28%
2020	House	Kuster 66–32%
2020	Governor	Sununu 52–47%
2022	Senator	Hassan 67–31%
2022	House	Kuster 69–31%
2022	Governor	Sherman 56–43%
2024	House	Goodlander 63–37%
2024	Governor	Craig 57–41%

Concord is governed via the council-manager system. The city council consists of a mayor and 14 councilors, ten of which are elected to two-year terms representing each of the city wards, while the other four are elected at-large to four-year terms. The mayor is elected directly every two years. The current mayor as of 2026 is Byron Champlin, who was elected on November 4, 2025, with 62.6% of the vote.

According to the Concord city charter, the mayor chairs the council, however has very few formal powers over the day-to-day management of the city. The actual operations of the city are overseen by the city manager, currently Thomas J. Aspell Jr. The current interim police chief is Barrett Moulton.

In the New Hampshire Senate, Concord is in the 15th District, represented by Democrat Tara Reardon. On the New Hampshire Executive Council, Concord is in the 2nd District, represented by Karen Liot Hill, the sole Democrat on the council. In the United States House of Representatives, Concord is in New Hampshire's 2nd congressional district, represented by Democrat Maggie Goodlander.

New Hampshire Department of Corrections operates the New Hampshire State Prison for Men and New Hampshire State Prison for Women in Concord.

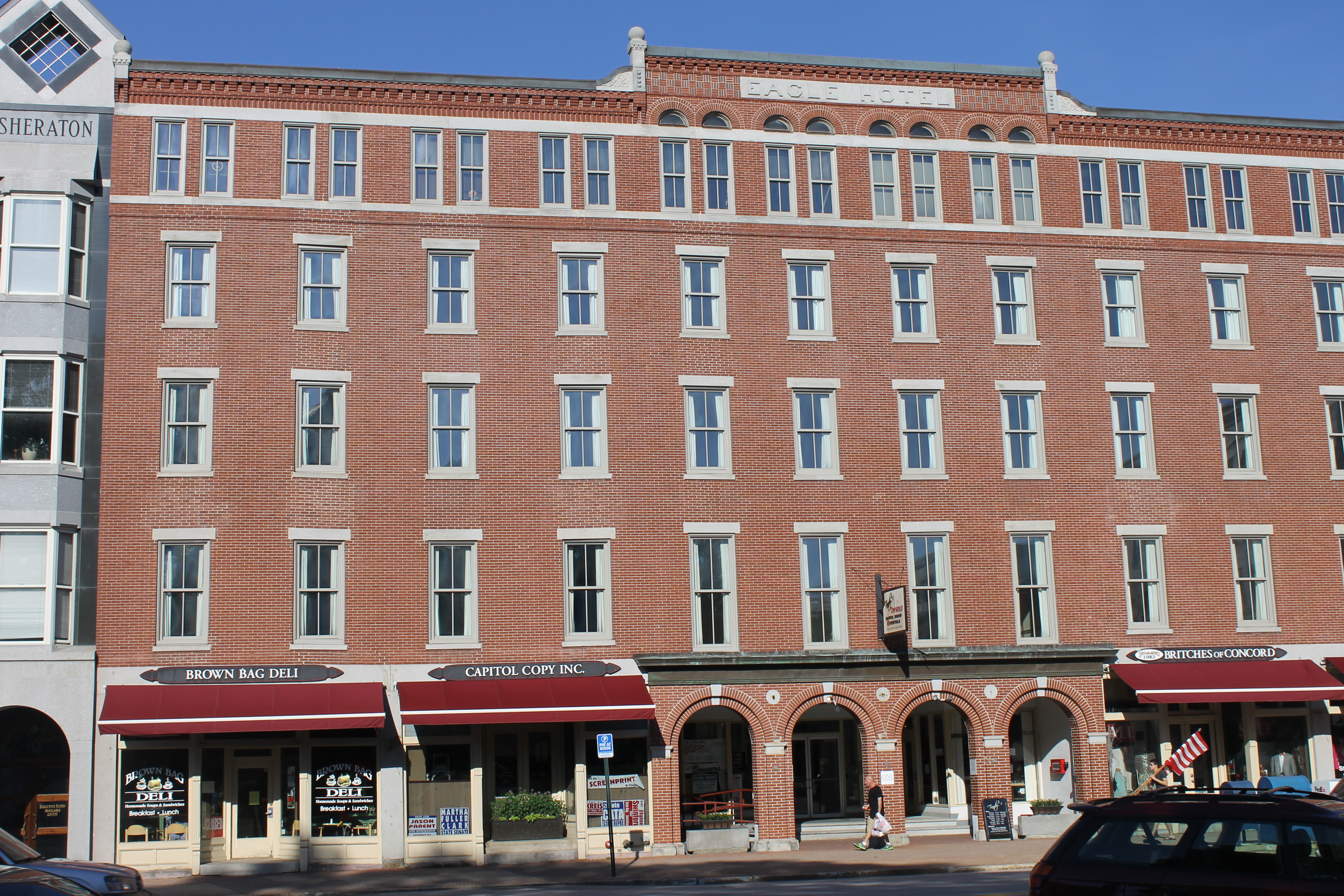
Across from the state capitol, the former Eagle Hotel on Main Street was a downtown landmark in Concord from its opening in 1827 until it closed in 1961. It was added in 1978 to the National Register of Historic Places.

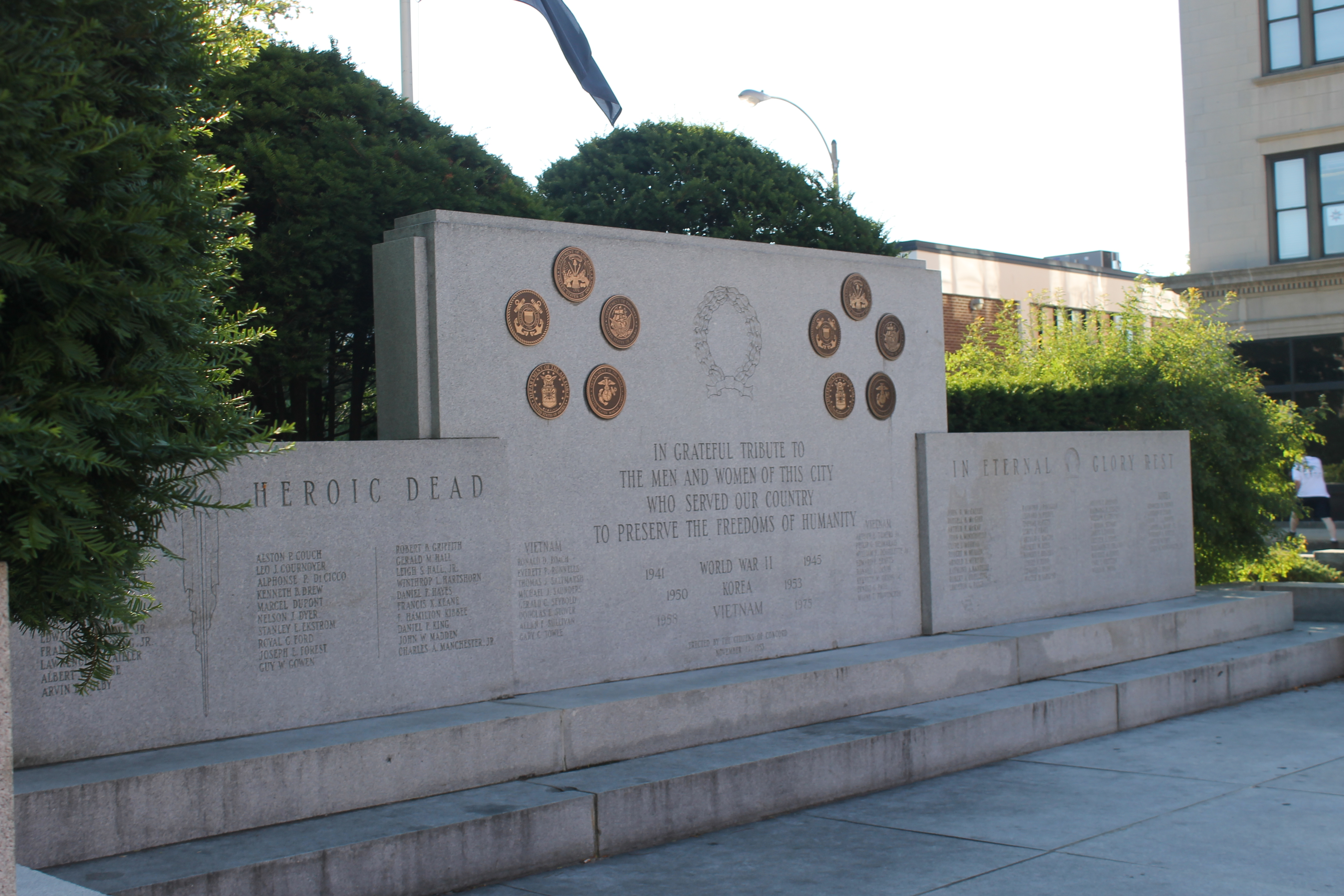
Veterans Monument in Concord

Concord leans strongly Democratic in presidential elections; the last Republican nominee to carry the city was then Vice President George H. W. Bush in 1988. Voter turnout was 72.7% in the 2020 general election, down from 76.2% in 2016, but still above the 2020 national turnout of 66.7%.

== Media ==
Newspapers and journals

- Concord Monitor (daily)
- Concord NH Patch (daily)
- New Hampshire Bulletin (daily)
- The Concord Insider (weekly)
- The Hippo (weekly)

Radio

- WKXL 1450 AM (News Talk Information)
- WNHN-LP 94.7 FM (Jazz, Blues, Progressive Talk)
- WEVO 89.1 FM (Public radio)
- WCNH 90.5 FM (Classical Music)
- WJYY 105.5 FM (Top 40)
- WAKC 102.3 FM (Contemporary Christian)
- WICX 102.7 FM (Catholic Radio)

The city is otherwise served by Manchester area stations. New Hampshire Public Radio is headquartered in Concord.

Television

- WPXG-TV (Channel 21) (Ion Television)
- Concord TV Public-access television cable TV station

== Sites of interest ==
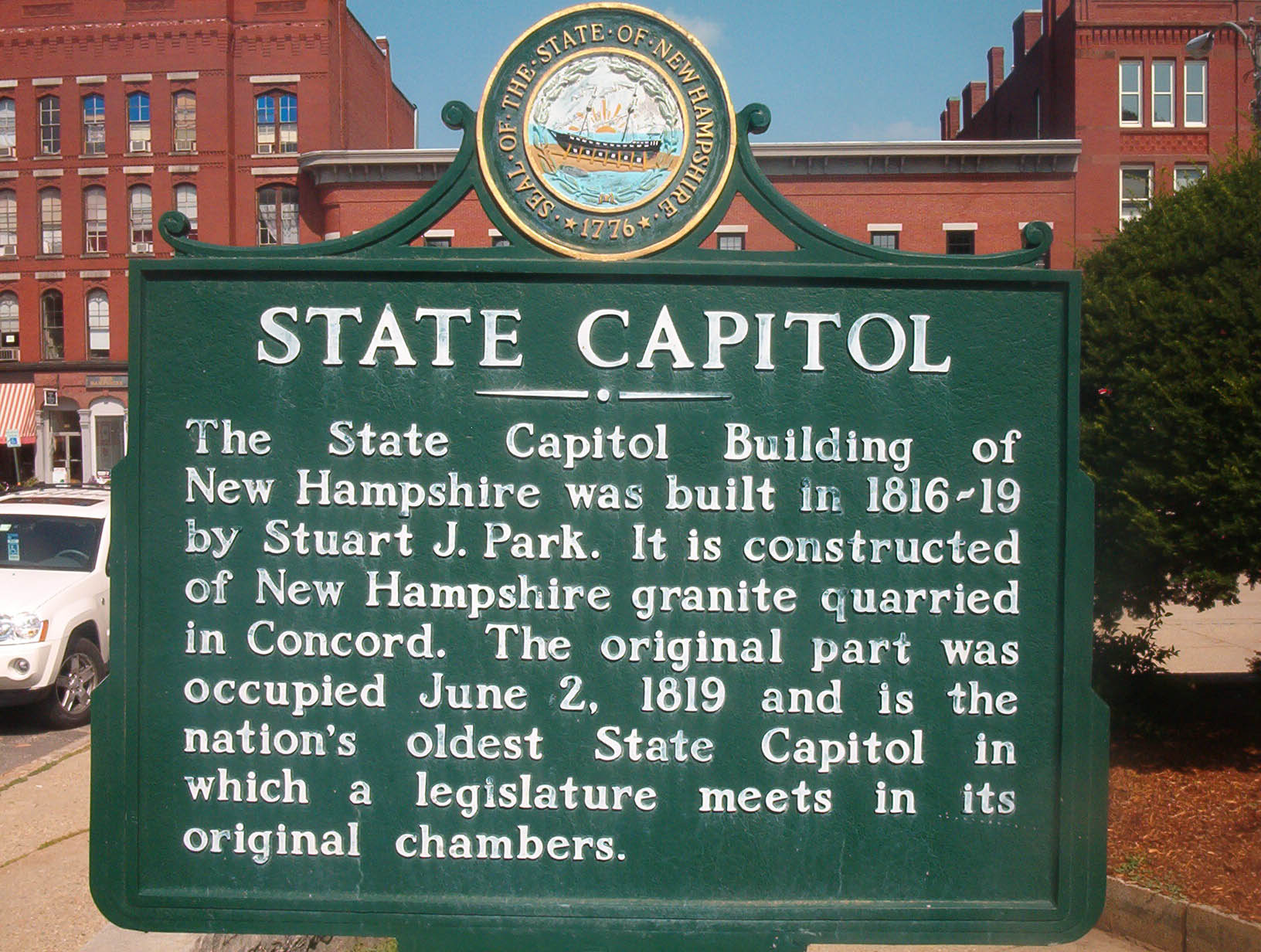
New Hampshire historical marker

The New Hampshire State House, designed by architect Stuart Park and constructed between 1815 and 1818, is the oldest state house in which the legislature meets in its original chambers. The building was remodeled in 1866, and the third story and west wing were added in 1910.

Across from the State House is the Eagle Hotel on Main Street, which has been a downtown landmark since its opening in 1827. U.S. Presidents Ulysses S. Grant, Rutherford Hayes, and Benjamin Harrison all dined there, and Franklin Pierce spent the night before departing for his inauguration. Other well-known guests included Jefferson Davis, Charles Lindbergh, Eleanor Roosevelt, Richard M. Nixon (who carried New Hampshire in all three of his presidential bids), and Thomas E. Dewey. The hotel closed in 1961.

South from the Eagle Hotel on Main Street is Phenix Hall, which replaced "Old" Phenix Hall, which burned in 1893. Both the old and new buildings featured multi-purpose auditoriums used for political speeches, theater productions, and fairs. Abraham Lincoln spoke at the old hall in 1860; Theodore Roosevelt, at the new hall in 1912.

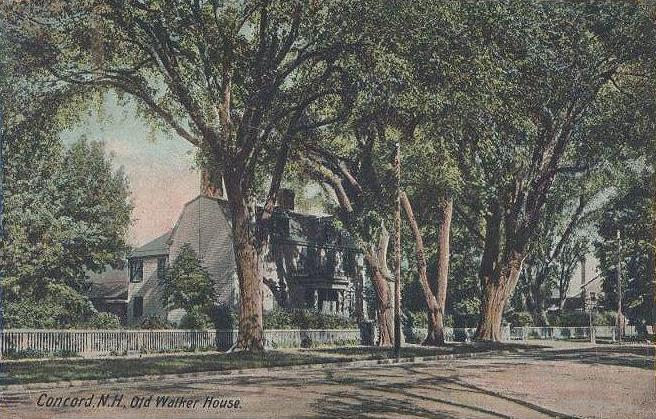
Walker-Woodman House, built from 1733 to 1735, as it appeared c. 1908

North on Main Street is the Walker-Woodman House, also known as the Reverend Timothy Walker House, the oldest standing two-story house in Concord. It was built for the Reverend Timothy Walker between 1733 and 1735.

On the north end of Main Street is the Pierce Manse, in which President Franklin Pierce lived in Concord before and following his presidency. The mid-1830s Greek Revival house was moved from Montgomery Street to North Main Street in 1971 to prevent its demolition.

Beaver Meadow Golf Course, located in the northern part of Concord, is one of the oldest golf courses in New England. Besides this golf course, other important sporting venues in Concord include Everett Arena and Memorial Field.

The SNOB (Somewhat North Of Boston) Film Festival, started in the fall of 2002, brings independent films and filmmakers to Concord and has provided an outlet for local filmmakers to display their films. SNOB Film Festival was a catalyst for the building in 2007 of Red River Theatres, a locally owned, nonprofit, independent cinema named after the 1948 film featuring John Wayne.

Other sites of interest include the Capitol Center for the Arts, the New Hampshire Historical Society, which has two facilities in Concord, and the McAuliffe-Shepard Discovery Center, a science museum named after Christa McAuliffe, the Concord teacher who died during the Space Shuttle Challenger disaster in 1986, and Alan Shepard, the Derry-born astronaut who was the second person and first American in space as well as the fifth and oldest person to walk on the Moon.

== Education ==
=== Public schools ===
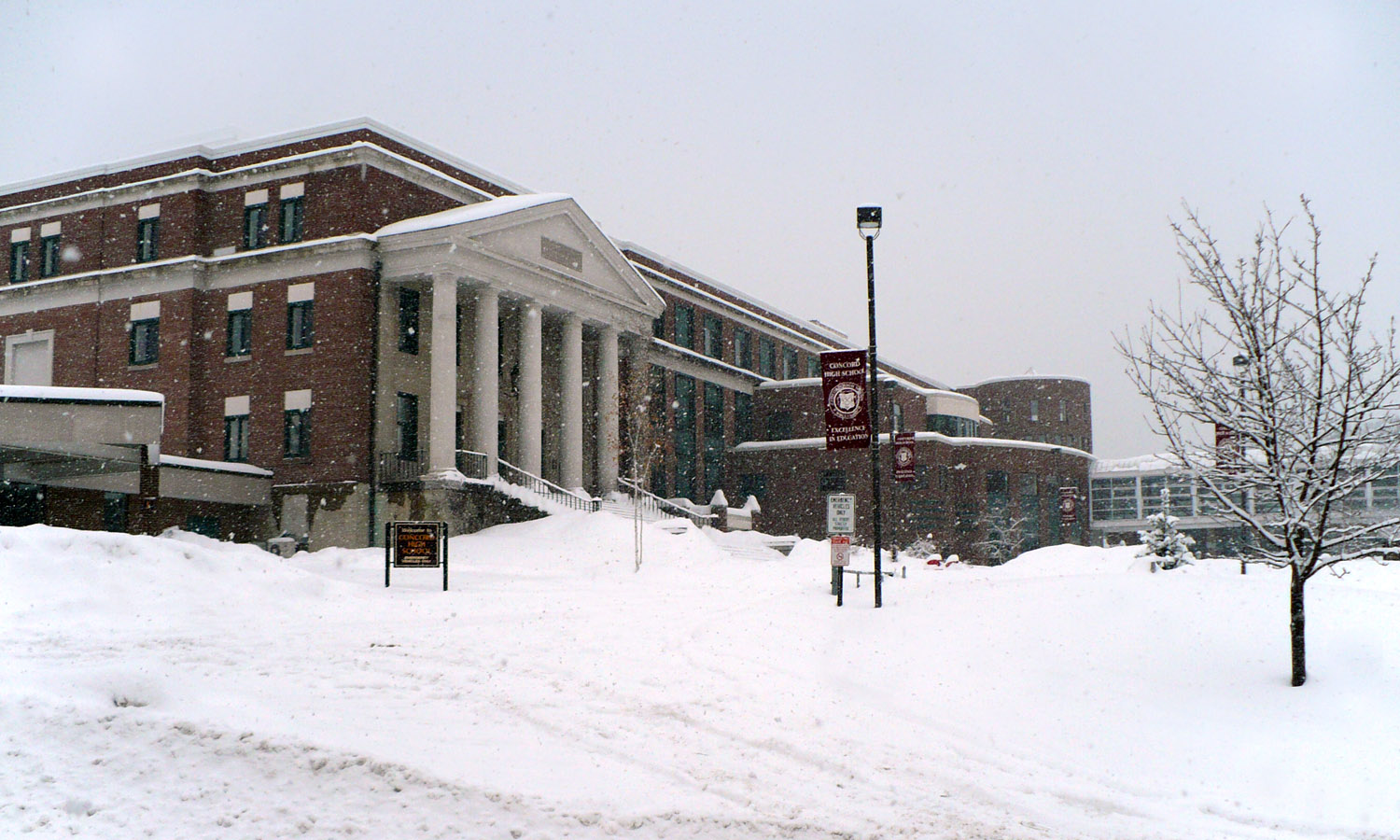
Concord High School during a 2007 snowstorm

Concord's public schools are within the Concord School District, except for schools in the Penacook area of the city, which are within the Merrimack Valley School District, a district which also includes several towns north of Concord. The only public high school in the Concord School District is Concord High School, which had about 1,450 students as of Fall 2023. The only public middle school in the Concord School District is Rundlett Middle School, which had roughly 770 students as of Fall 2023. Concord School District's elementary schools underwent a major re-configuration in 2012, with three newly constructed schools opening and replacing six previous schools. Kimball School and Walker School were replaced by Christa McAuliffe School on the Kimball School site, Conant School (and Rumford School, which closed a year earlier) were replaced by Abbot-Downing School at the Conant site, and Eastman and Dame schools were replaced by Mill Brook School, serving kindergarten through grade two, located next to Broken Ground Elementary School, serving grades three to five. Beaver Meadow School, the remaining elementary school, was unaffected by the changes.

Concord schools in the Merrimack Valley School District include Merrimack Valley High School and Merrimack Valley Middle School, which are adjacent to each other and to Rolfe Park in Penacook village, and Penacook Elementary School, just south of the village.

=== Private and charter schools ===
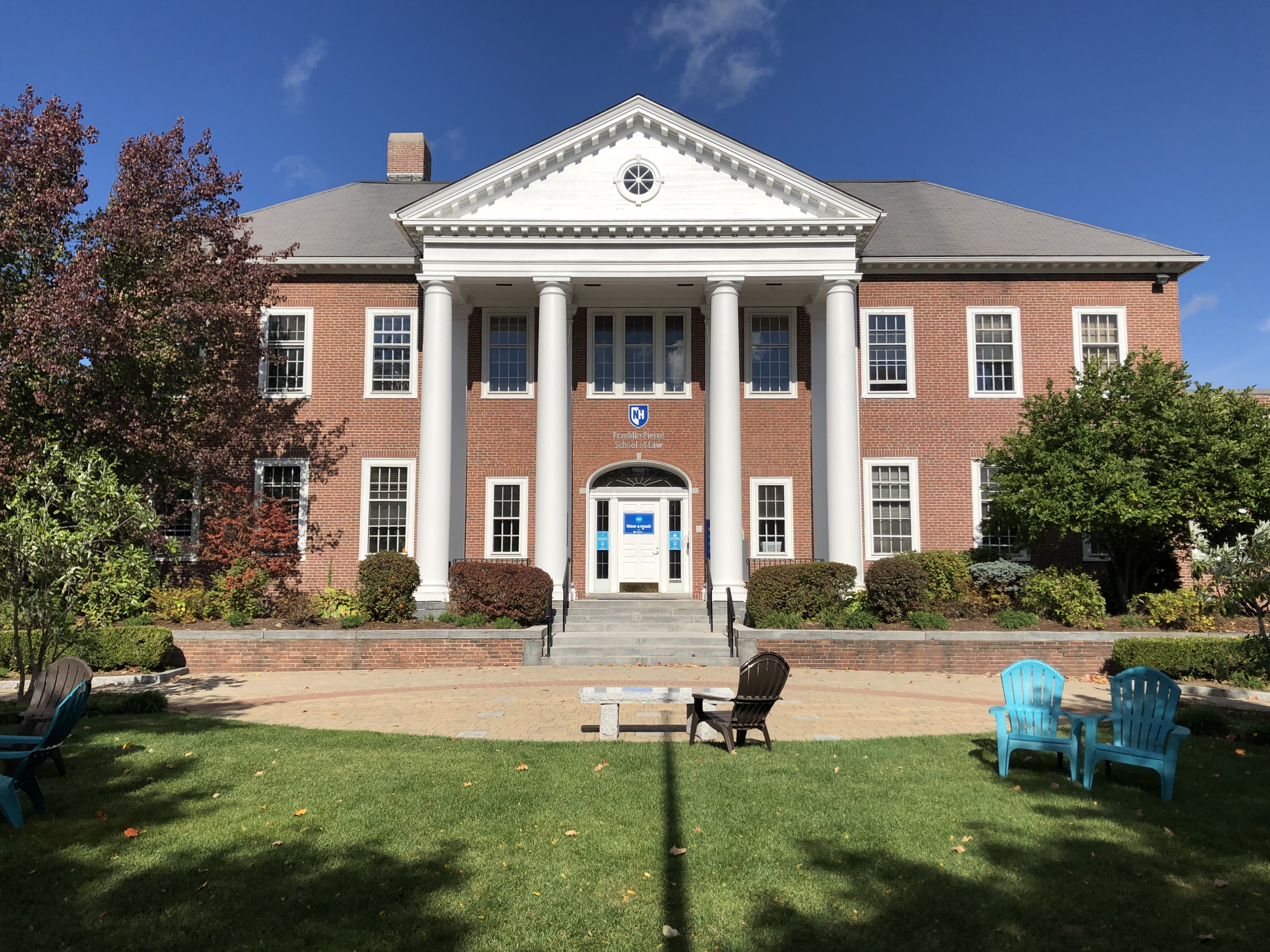
UNH Franklin Pierce School of Law

Concord has two parochial schools, Bishop Brady High School and Saint John Regional School.

Other area private schools include Concord Christian Academy, Parker Academy, Trinity Christian School, and Shaker Road School. Also in Concord is St. Paul's School, a boarding school located in the city's West End neighborhood.

=== Post-secondary schools ===
Concord is home to New Hampshire Technical Institute, the city's primary community college, and Granite State College, which offers online two-year and four-year degrees. The University of New Hampshire School of Law is located near downtown, and the Franklin Pierce University Doctorate of Physical Therapy program also has a location in the city. Concord Hospital recently announced plans to open a joint program with the New England College School of Nursing as part of their Bachelor of Nursing degree. Concord is also a major clinical site of Dartmouth College's Geisel School of Medicine, New Hampshire's only medical school.
