= Mary Runnells Bird =

Canadian physician (1870–1961)

- Mary Runnells Bird, from a 1960 newspaper profile
- Born: Mary Adelaide Runnells; August 21, 1870 near Granby, Quebec
- Died: August 31, 1961 (aged 91); Hudson, Quebec
- Occupation: Physician

Mary Adelaide Runnells Bird (August 21, 1870 – August 31, 1961) was a Canadian physician, described as "one of Canada's first women doctors", and a military hospital surgeon in England during World War I.

== Early life and education ==
Runnells was born near Granby, Quebec, the daughter of George W. Runnells and Sarah Edmonds Runnells. As a child, she worked in the cotton mills of Ludlow, Massachusetts to help pay the mortgage on her family's farm. She attended a school in Acton Vale, and graduated from Granby Academy. As a young woman she was encouraged by American physician Jane Elizabeth Hoyt-Stevens to pursue a medical education. Hoyt-Stevens also paid her first-year expenses at Bishop's Medical College in Montreal. Runnells completed her medical degree in 1900. She later held an ad eundum medical degree from McGill University, when her medical school became part of McGill.

== Career ==
During World War I, Bird was house surgeon at the private Egginton Hall Hospital in England, established by Ethel Innes Dugdale, where she treated British "wounded men fresh from the trenches." After the war, she was an assistant medical officer in charge of maternal health and child welfare for the City of Derby. In 1923, the Birds moved back to Canada, where she was on the staff of Montreal General Hospital, and an attendant doctor for the YWCA. She lectured on preventive medicine, vaccinations, and addiction topics.

== Personal life ==
Runnells married Englishman Charles Glover Bird in 1905, and moved to England. Her husband died in 1954. She died in Hudson, Quebec in 1961, at the age of 91.
