= Mary Page Bird =

American poet and novelist

- Born: June 26, 1866; Cobham
- Died: 1924 (aged 57–58); London
- Occupation: Novelist
- Parent(s): Carter Henry Page

Mary Bowdoin Page Bird (June 26, 1866 – 1924) was an American poet and novelist.

Mary Bowdoin Page was born on June 26, 1866 in Cobham, Albemarle County, Virginia. She was the daughter of Carter Henry Page and Leila Graham Page and a member of the prominent Page family. In 1892, she married Gilbert Bonham Bird from Berwickshire. They lived in England and later in North Carolina.

She wrote poetry and particularly focused on the sonnet form. She had reportedly written a hundred sonnets by her early twenties. She published numerous poems in publications, including Lippincott's and Harper's. In 1894, she published her first novel, Wedded to a Genius, under the pseudonym Neil Christison. It was about a woman, Judith, married to a doctor who emotionally abuses her. She also serialized her work Sir Wilfred in the magazine Things and Thoughts.

Mary Page Bird died in 1924 in London.

== Bibliography ==
- Wedded to a Genius: A Novel. 2 vol. London: Bentley, 1894.
