= Concord Hospital (New Hampshire) =

Hospital in New Hampshire

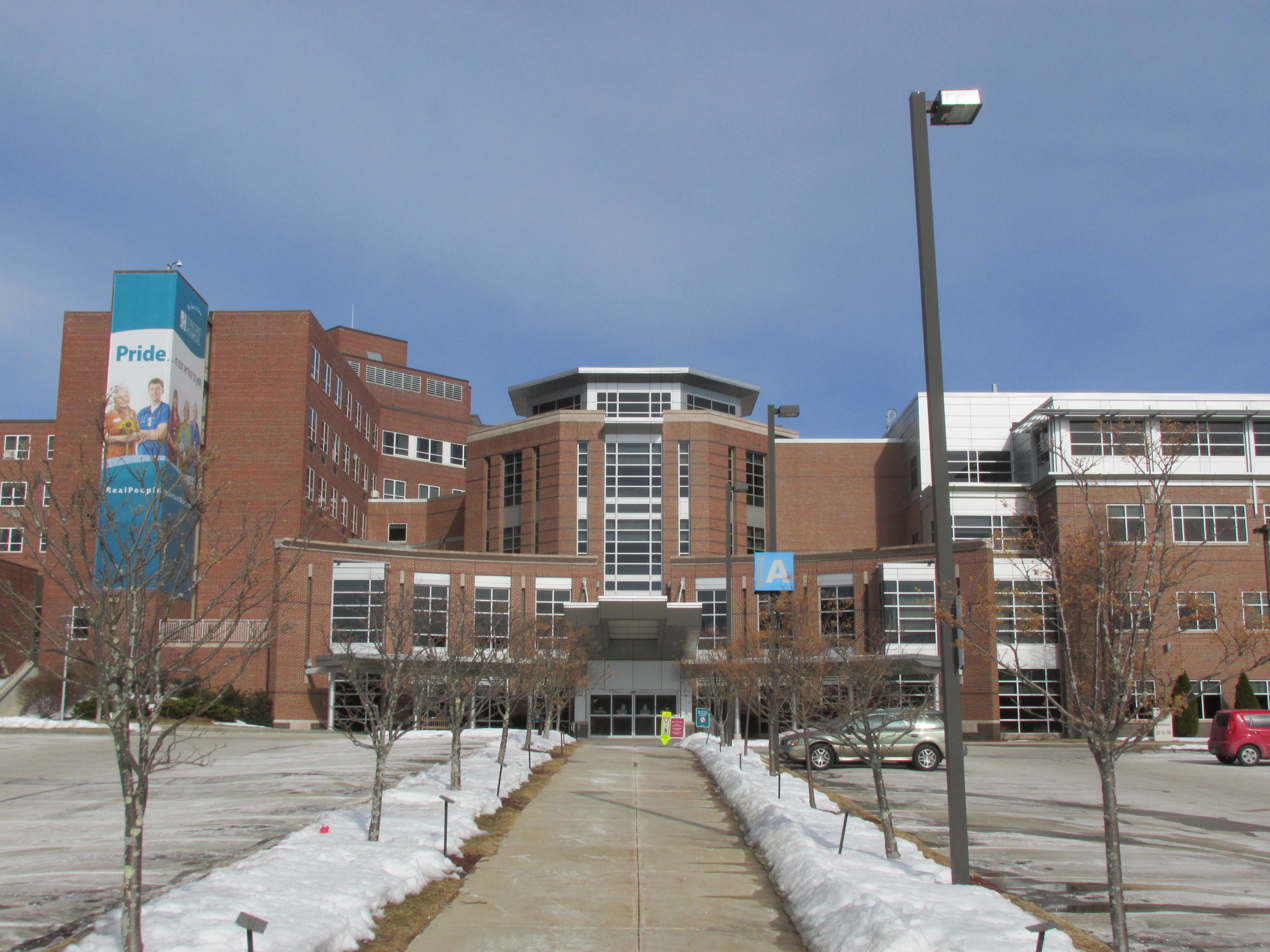
- Concord Hospital

Geography
- Location: 250 Pleasant Street, Concord, New Hampshire, United States
- Coordinates: 43.198564°N 71.562842°W

Organization
- Type: Teaching
- Affiliated university: Dartmouth Geisel School of Medicine

Services
- Emergency department: Level II Adult Trauma Center; Level III Pediatric Trauma Center
- Beds: 295

Helipads
- Helipad: FAA LID: NH13
Number	Length		Surface
Number	ft	m	Surface
1	55x55	17x17	Asphalt

History
- Founded: 1891

Links
- Website: http://www.concordhospital.org
- Lists: Hospitals in New Hampshire

Concord Hospital is a non-profit hospital located in the West End of Concord, New Hampshire. It is the principal location of the Concord Hospital Health System, and is a teaching hospital affiliated with Dartmouth Geisel School of Medicine, New Hampshire's only medical school.

It is home to the Payson Center for Cancer Care, an American College of Surgeons comprehensive cancer program, serving as a regional referral resource for New Hampshire. It has the busiest emergency department in the state of New Hampshire, having treated roughly 75,000 patients in the emergency room during 2024. It is also an ACS-verified level II Trauma Center, designating that the hospital has the resources to provide initial definitive trauma care for a wide range of injuries and injury severity, as well as serve as a regional leader in trauma education and disaster management. The Concord Hospital Medical Group, the administrating organization of Concord Hospital and affiliated institutions, is the largest private employer in the city and consists of nearly 3,400 staff members and over 475 clinical providers across three inpatient hospitals and over 80 primary care and specialty locations.

== History ==
The Concord Hospital Association was founded in 1884, to provide care to the poor and sick of the Concord area. George A. Pillsbury, father of Pillsbury Company co-founder Charles Pillsbury, provided a gift of nearly $60,000 to the association for the construction of a charitable hospital. Margaret Pillsbury General Hospital, named after George's wife in honor of their 50th wedding anniversary, was opened on December 15, 1891. In 1896, another hospital, the Memorial Hospital for Women and Children, was opened to provide care for poor women and children. The two hospitals merged in 1946 to become Concord Hospital. As part of the merger, the Concord Hospital School of Nursing was established, remaining in operation until 1989. In the summer of 2019 Concord Hospital was upgraded to a Level II Trauma Center after years of upgrades and preparations, followed shortly by the opening of the Memorial building, which added new operating rooms, office space, and patient beds. In 2021, the hospital received final approval to purchase Lakes Region General Hospital and Franklin Regional Hospital due to the latters' bankruptcy following the COVID-19 pandemic. After successful acquisition, the two hospitals were renamed to Concord Hospital-Laconia and Concord Hospital-Franklin, thus establishing a unified healthcare network in central New Hampshire.

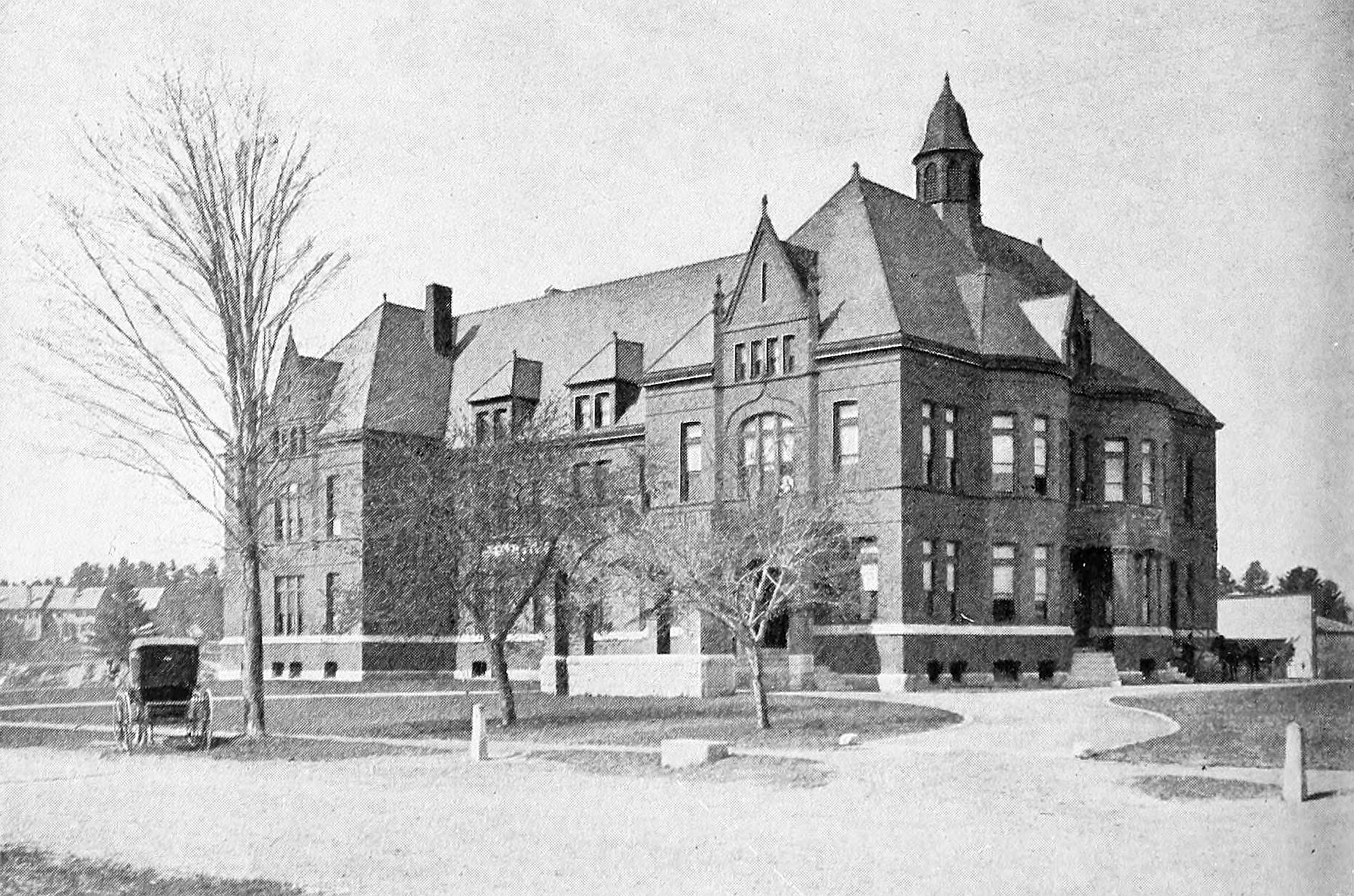
Margaret Pillsbury Hospital, circa 1887

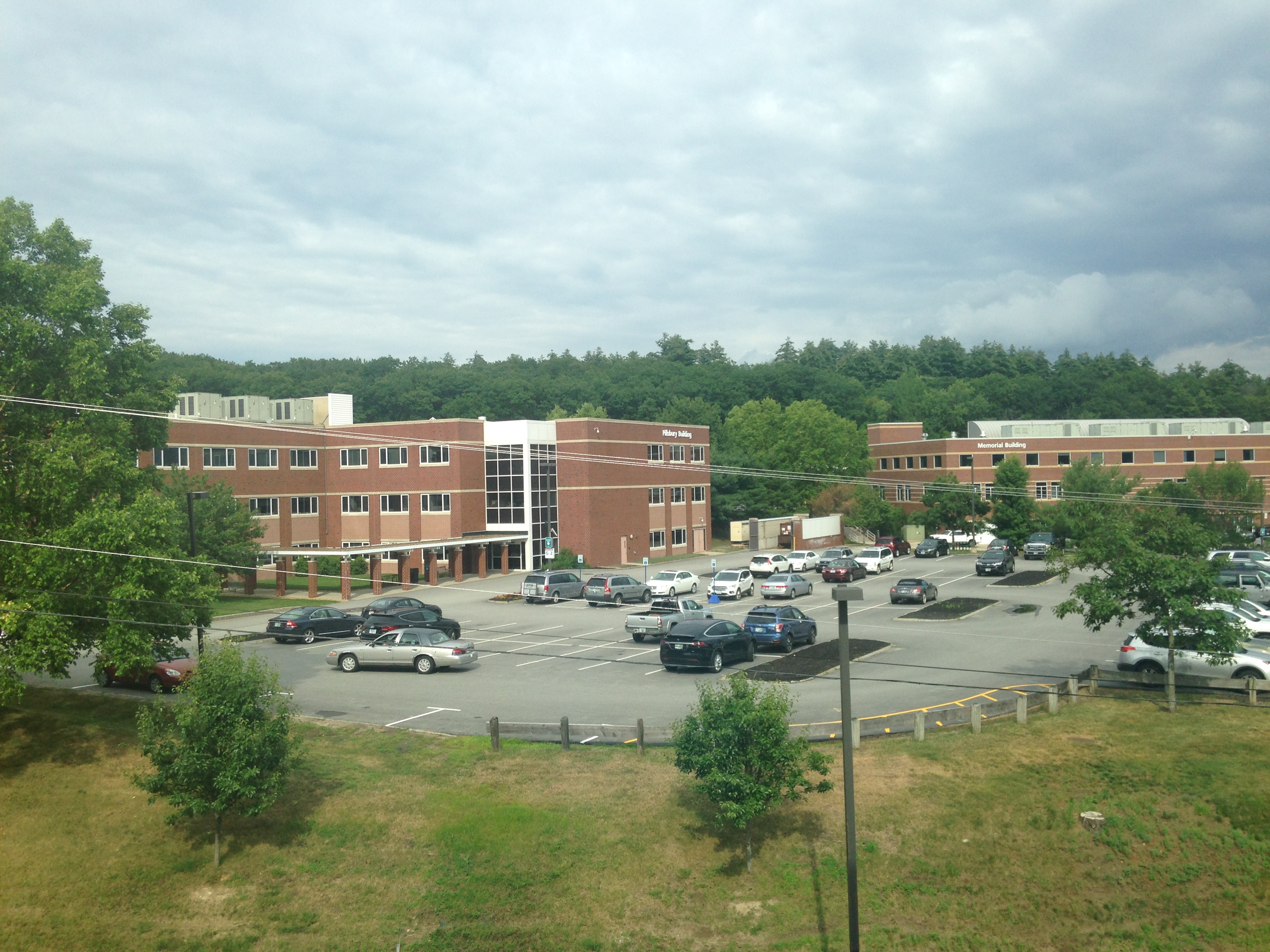
The Memorial Building in the Concord Hospital Campus, 2017

== Rankings & recognitions ==
In 2023, Concord Hospital did not meet the criteria to be regionally ranked by U.S. News Health for the first time in several years. It did, however, receive "high performance" ratings in hip replacement and knee replacement surgery. The hospital was recognized as one of "America's Best Maternity Hospitals" in 2024 by Newsweek, one of only two in the state to do so.

== Community benefits ==
In fiscal year 2017, Concord Hospital invested $51,513,840 of its annual budget to provide community benefit programs and services, which included $26,970,136 to specifically respond to the community health needs identified in the most recent Capital Region Health Needs Assessment conducted in 2015. In addition, the Concord Hospital Trust provided $2,688,670 in funding to support the hospital's charitable mission and the needs of vulnerable populations for a total of charitable investment of more than $54 million.

== Notable persons ==
- Joseph Avellone, surgeon
- James M. Langley, first president of Concord Hospital
- Susan Lynch, pediatrician
