= Downtown Concord Historic District =

Historic district in New Hampshire, United States

- U.S. National Register of Historic Places
- U.S. Historic district
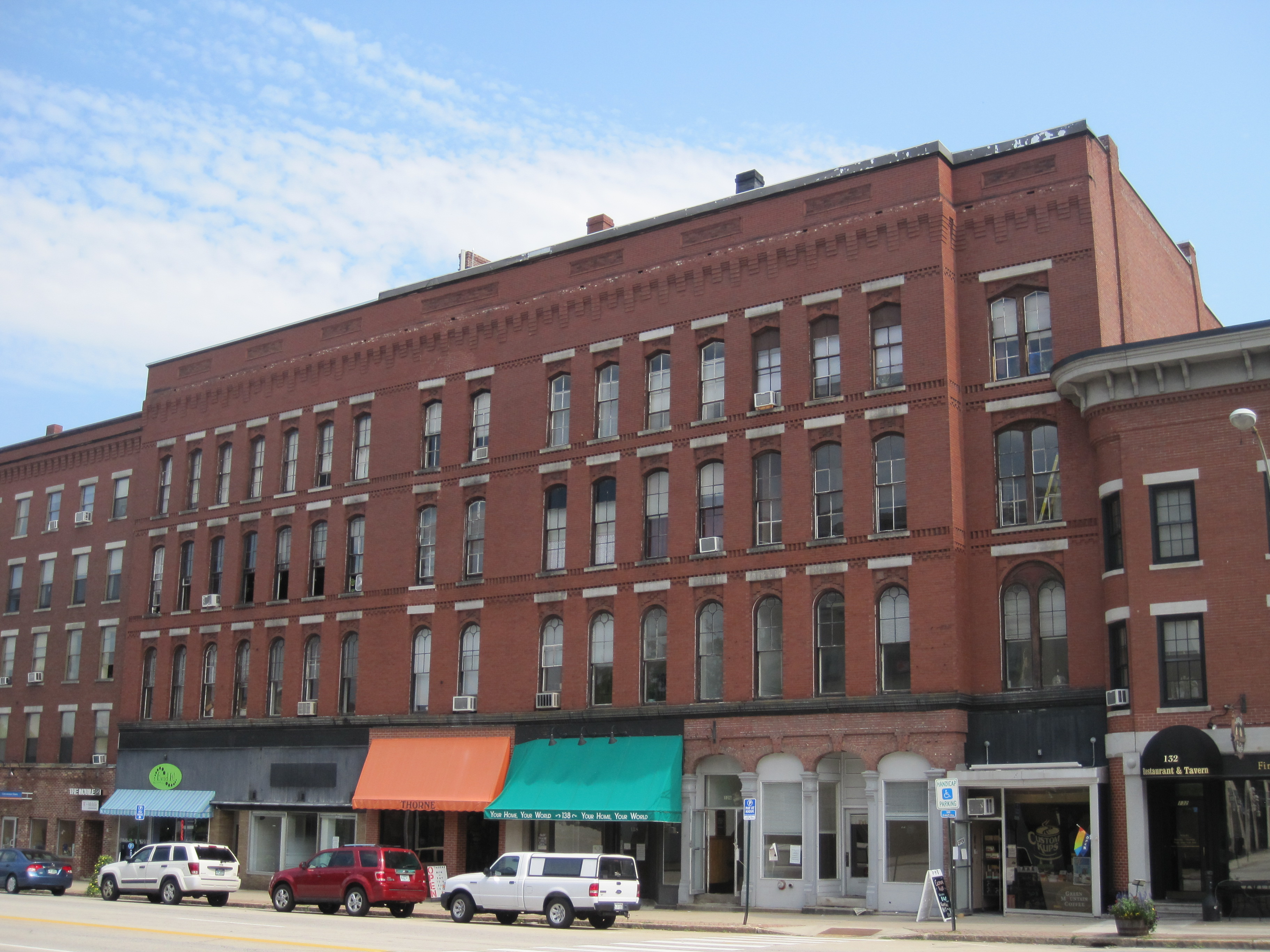
- Stickney's Block on Main Street

- Location within New Hampshire Location within the United States
- Location: Roughly bounded by Centre St., Loudon Rd., Storrs St., Hills Ave., S. State, Green, School, Capitol, and Park Sts., Concord, New Hampshire
- Coordinates: 43°12′19″N 71°32′15″W
- Area: 25 acres (10 ha)
- Architect: Dow, Samuel H., et al.
- Architectural style: Federal, Greek Revival, et al.
- NRHP reference No.: 00000652
- Added to NRHP: June 9, 2000

The Downtown Concord Historic District encompasses most of the commercial heart of downtown Concord, New Hampshire, United States. Incorporated in 1734, Concord became the state capital in 1808 and the seat of Merrimack County in 1823. Economic growth followed, due in part to these government institutions and also to the rise of industry along the Merrimack River, which flows through the city east of the downtown area, and the arrival in the 1840s of the railroad. The New Hampshire State House was built in 1819 south of the traditional center of the city (now the Concord Historic District), and the commercial heart of the city began to take shape along the First New Hampshire Turnpike south of the State House (now Main Street). The district was listed on the National Register of Historic Places in 2000.

The district is centered on North and South Main Street, between Loudon Road/Centre Street in the north and Hills Avenue in the south. It also includes properties on North State Street between Pleasant and School streets, as well as some on the side streets extending for one block on either side of Main Street. It does not include the New Hampshire State House or its grounds, which are listed as part of the Concord Civic District.

Most of the buildings in district were constructed in the second half of the 19th century. The oldest wood-frame building is the 1819 wood frame Upham-Walker House on Park Street, which is separately listed on the National Register. The first brick commercial building in Concord, the Merrimack County Bank building at 47 North Main Street, was built in 1808 and significantly altered in the 1860s; it is also separately listed. Following the arrival of the railroad, there was a flurry of building activity in the 1850s and 1860s, in which time many of Main Street's brick buildings were built.

== See also ==
- National Register of Historic Places listings in Merrimack County, New Hampshire
