= Page Belting Company Mills =

- U.S. National Register of Historic Places
- U.S. Historic district
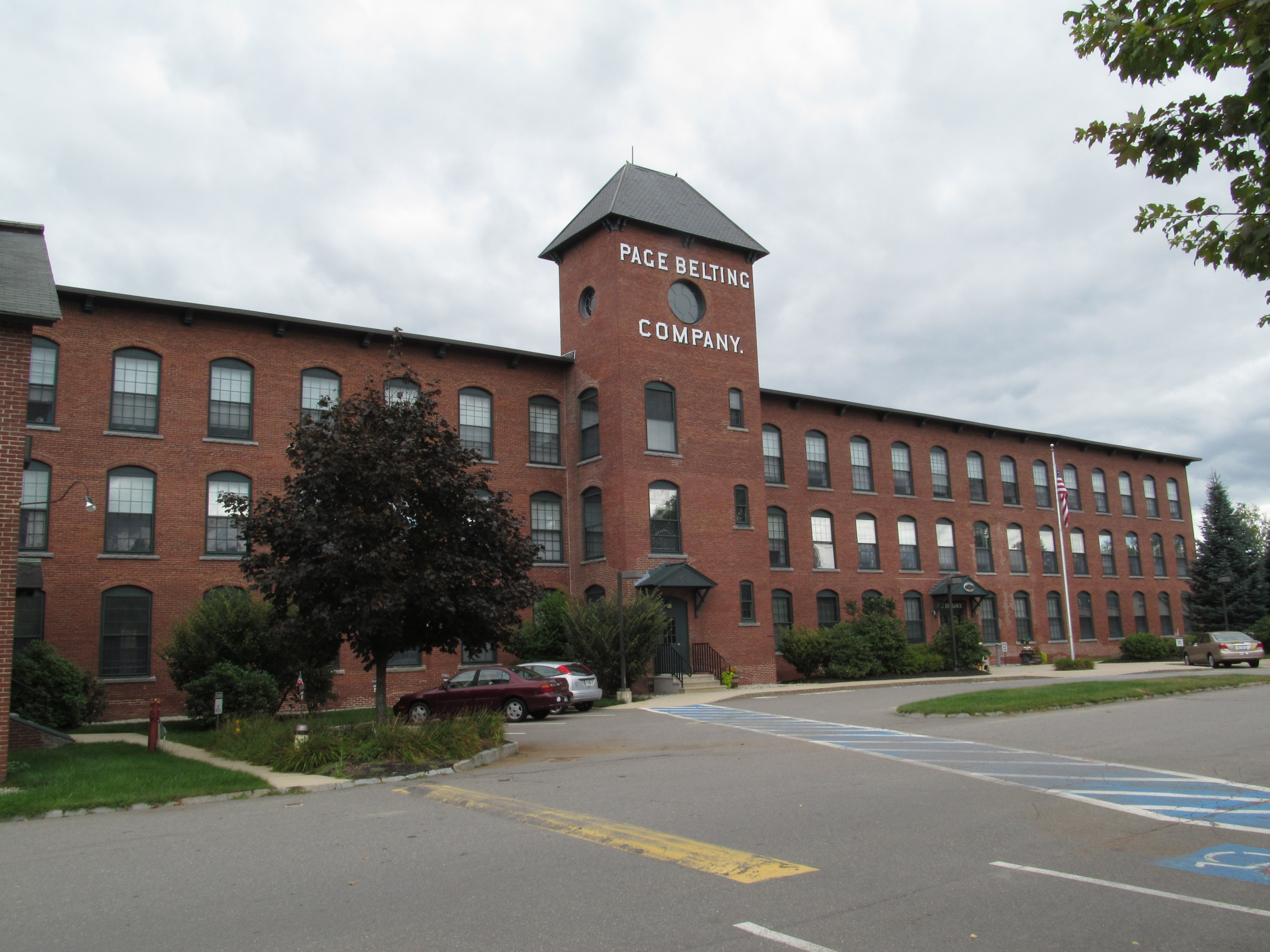

- Location within New Hampshire Location within the United States
- Location: 26 Commercial St., Concord, New Hampshire
- Coordinates: 43°13′1″N 71°32′21″W
- Area: 4.4 acres (1.8 ha)
- Built: 1892
- Architect: Knight, Albion H.
- Architectural style: Industrial
- NRHP reference No.: 02000641
- Added to NRHP: June 14, 2002

The Page Belting Company Mills is a historic mechanical belt mill complex at 26 Commercial Street in Concord, New Hampshire, United States. Located north of Concord's central business district near Horseshoe Pond, the complex consists of four brick buildings built between 1892 and 1906 for one of the city's major businesses. The mill complex, now converted to residential and other uses, was listed on the National Register of Historic Places in 2002.

== Description and history ==
The Page Belting Company Mills is a complex of four brick connected brick buildings, set on the southern bank of Horseshoe Pond, an oxbow lake of the Merrimack River. The complex is located between the pond and United States Route 202, and just east of Concord's historic early center. The two largest buildings are the belt shop and curry shop, which are respectively three and four stories in height. The belt shop has a four-story tower near the center of its long facade, which acts as the complex's focal point and was originally its main entrance. The other two buildings are a 1 1/2-story office building, and a single-story boiler house.

The Page Belting Company was established in 1877, and continues to be a major local business even after moving from these premises in 1994. It produced leather strapping for use in the transmission of power within factories through line shafts. At its height, the company complex was the largest in the city. The construction of these surviving buildings was the result of a project to replace all of the company's earlier wood-frame buildings.

== See also ==
- National Register of Historic Places listings in Merrimack County, New Hampshire
