= Hall Memorial Library =

Hall Memorial Library may refer to:

- Hall Memorial Library (Ellington, Connecticut)
- Hall Memorial Library (Northfield, New Hampshire), listed on the National Register of Historic Places
