= New Hampshire Savings Bank Building =

- U.S. National Register of Historic Places
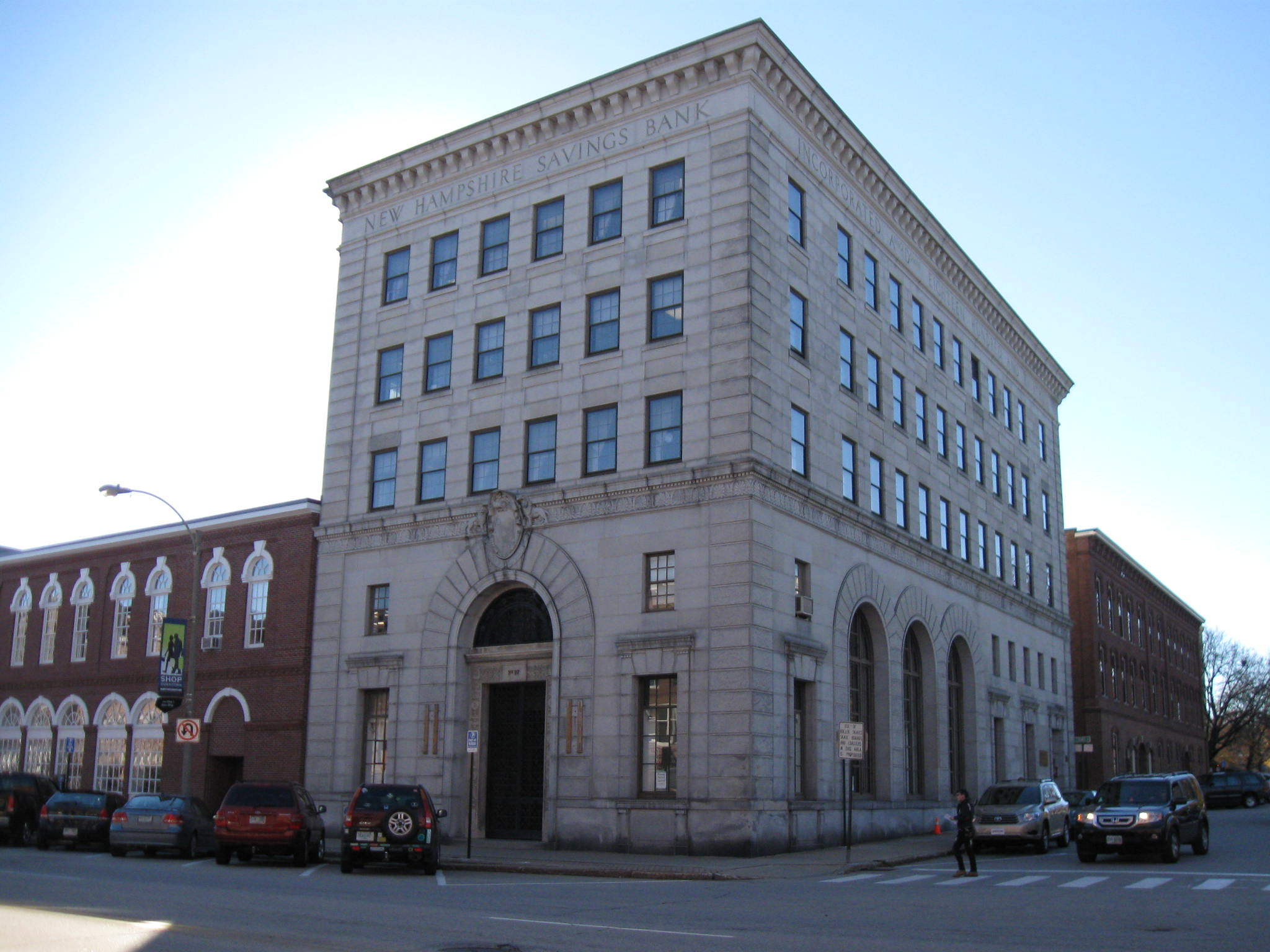

- Location within New Hampshire Location within the United States
- Location: 97 N. Main St., Concord, New Hampshire
- Coordinates: 43°12′24″N 71°32′14″W
- Area: less than one acre
- Built: 1926
- Architect: J. D. Leland & Company; George W. Griffin
- Architectural style: Late 19th And 20th Century Revivals, Italian Renaissance
- NRHP reference No.: 88000658
- Added to NRHP: June 14, 1988

The New Hampshire Savings Bank Building is a historic commercial building at 97 North Main Street in downtown Concord, New Hampshire, across Capitol Street from the New Hampshire State House. The five story granite building was built in 1926-27 for what is now the oldest bank in the city, and was the only bank building built in the city in the first half of the 20th century. The building was listed on the National Register of Historic Places in 1988.

New Hampshire Savings Bank was founded in 1830, as the fourth in the state and third in the city. It first occupied part of the Merrimack County Bank building at 214 North Main Street, followed by Stickney's Block, which stood just south of the Eagle Hotel, roughly across North Main Street from this building. The bank purchased Stickney's in 1885, demolished it, and built the commercial block now on that site. Seeking a larger space in the early 1920s, it purchased a three-story block on this site, demolished it in 1925, and built the present building. Its major design work was done by Joseph D. Leland of Boston, with local support from George W. Griffin. Granite for the building's construction came from the Rattlesnake Hill quarry in West Concord. The building originally had two full-size floors, with U-shaped upper floors; the open U was enclosed in 1986. The lower two floors were at first mainly occupied by a large banking hall, which had a two-story ceiling; offices of the president and bank trustees were located on a mezzanine level.

== See also ==
- National Register of Historic Places listings in Merrimack County, New Hampshire
