= Henniker Town Hall =

- U.S. National Register of Historic Places
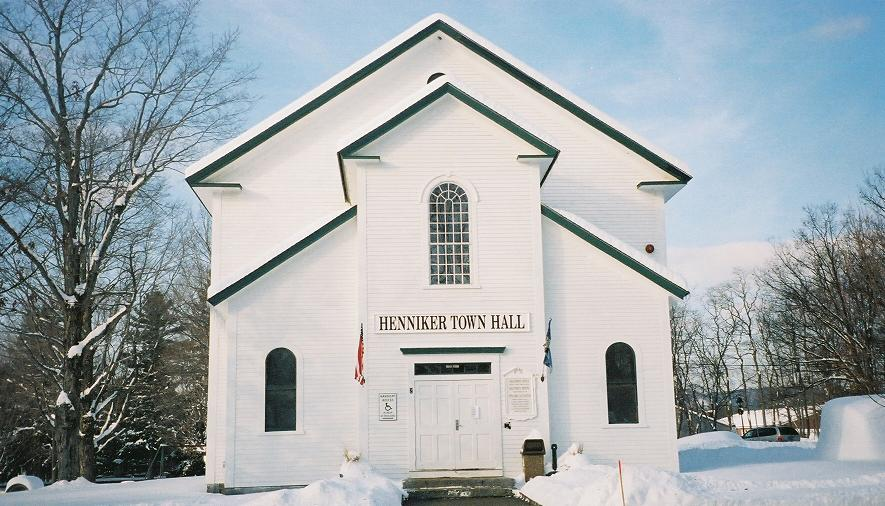

- Location within New Hampshire Location within the United States
- Location: Depot Hill Rd., Henniker, New Hampshire
- Coordinates: 43°10′32″N 71°49′23″W
- Area: 4 acres (1.6 ha)
- Built: 1786
- NRHP reference No.: 81000074
- Added to NRHP: February 24, 1981

The Henniker Town Hall is the town hall of Henniker, New Hampshire. The wood-frame building, built in 1786–87, is one of a small number of surviving 18th century meetinghouses in New Hampshire. At that time, its main entrance was on the long south wall, facing the raised pulpit on the north wall, and the floor was taken up by pews. The interior was decorated with high quality woodwork, which still survives. The roughly rectangular building had 1 1/2-story enclosed porch extensions on both sides.

By the 1880s the building had been dedicated exclusively for municipal use, and in 1887 it underwent major alterations. Its upper galleries were built over to provide a full second floor, and the western porch was converted for use by the board of selectmen above, and a kitchen facility below. The eastern porch was converted into a vestibule area with ticket booth and cloakroom, and became the new main entrance. Some alterations were also made to the exterior, giving it is present appearance.

The building served as the town hall until 1946, after which it was used by New England College as a classroom facility. Inadequacies in its heating system precluded it from more than incidental uses, however. In the 1970s the town voted to restore the building for use as its town hall. The first floor meeting space was converted to office areas for municipal and court functions, but with movable partitions so as not to harm the historic fabric of the building.

The building was listed on the National Register of Historic Places in 1981.

== See also ==
- National Register of Historic Places listings in Merrimack County, New Hampshire
