= Hill Center Church =

Historic church in New Hampshire, United States

- U.S. National Register of Historic Places
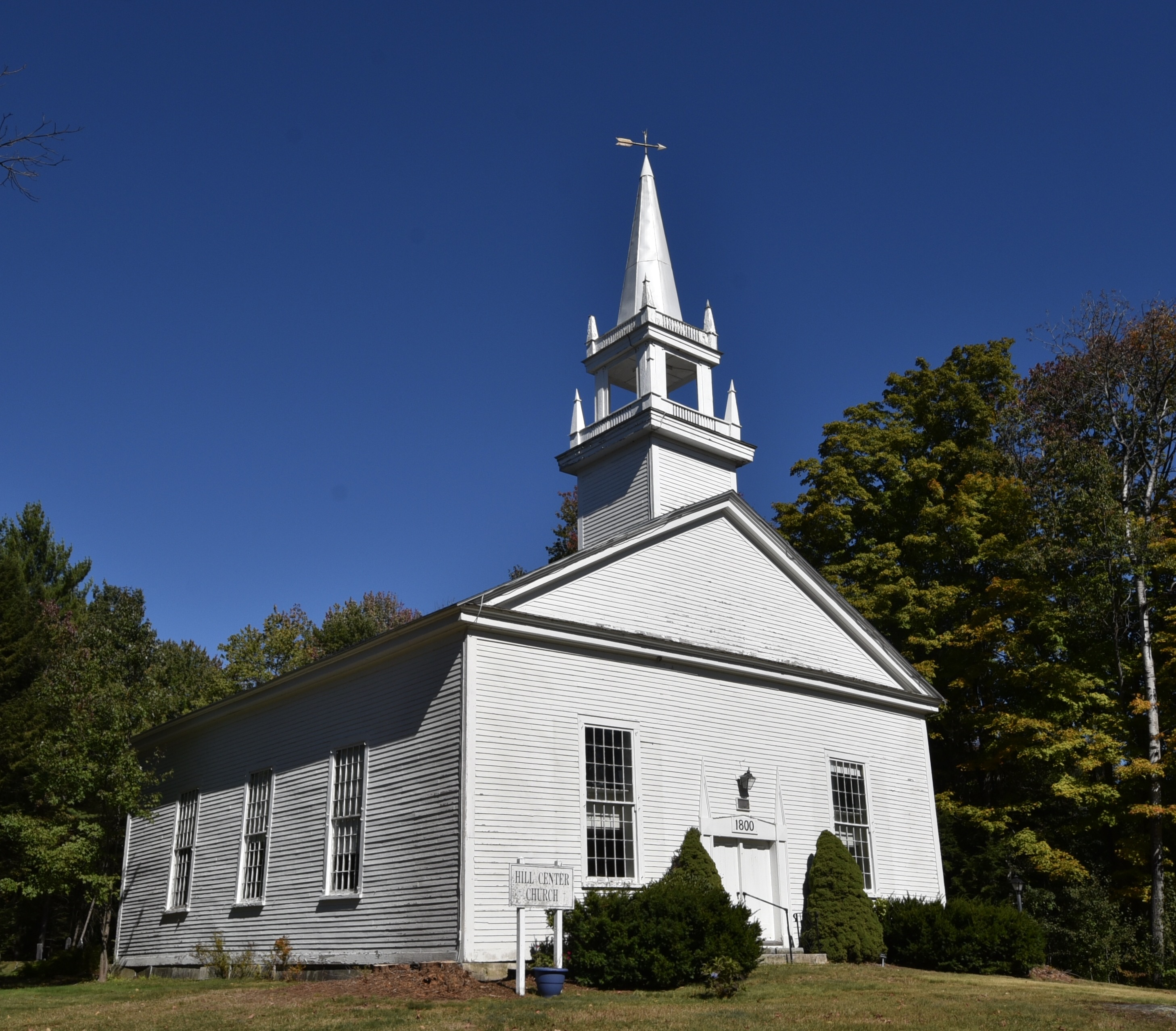

- Location within New Hampshire Location within the United States
- Location: Murray Hill Rd., Hill, New Hampshire
- Coordinates: 43°31′25.6″N 71°44′26.5″W
- Area: 0.6 acres (0.24 ha)
- Built: 1799
- Architect: Osgood, Enoch
- Architectural style: Gothic, Pseudo-Gothic
- NRHP reference No.: 85002186
- Added to NRHP: September 12, 1985

The Hill Center Church (formerly the New Chester Meeting House) is a historic church on Murray Hill Road in Hill, New Hampshire. Built in 1799 and extensively altered in 1847, it is a well-preserved example of Gothic Revival architecture, used historically for both religious and civic functions in the town. Now maintained by a local community group, the building was listed on the National Register of Historic Places in 1985.

== Description and history ==
The Hill Center Church is located in central Hill, a rural community north of Concord, New Hampshire, on the north side of Murray Hill Road between Currier and Dearborn Roads. It is a 1 1/2-story wood-frame structure, with a gabled roof and clapboarded exterior. Its main facade is three bays wide, with a pair of sash windows on either side of the main entrance. The entrance is flanked by pilasters, which rise to blocks topped by finial-like moulding. The gable above is fully pedimented, and a two-stage tower rises above the main roof ridge. The first stage is square, with plain clapboarded sides, and is capped by a cornice with pyramidal finials at the corners and a low balustrade. The second stage is an open belfry, with square corner posts, and is also capped by a balustrade and finials. The tower is capped by an octagonal spire and weathervane.

The church was built in 1799 as a meeting house (for religious and civic functions), when the town of Hill was known as New Chester. In the 1840s the town voted to build a separate town hall, and the church congregation voted to renovate the building, which was in need of significant maintenance. Because the work done in 1847 significantly altered the building, its original appearance is only known from general descriptions. It again underwent major restorative work in the 1960s, and is maintained by a local community group.

== See also ==
- National Register of Historic Places listings in Merrimack County, New Hampshire
