= South Danbury Christian Church =

Historic church in New Hampshire, United States

- U.S. National Register of Historic Places
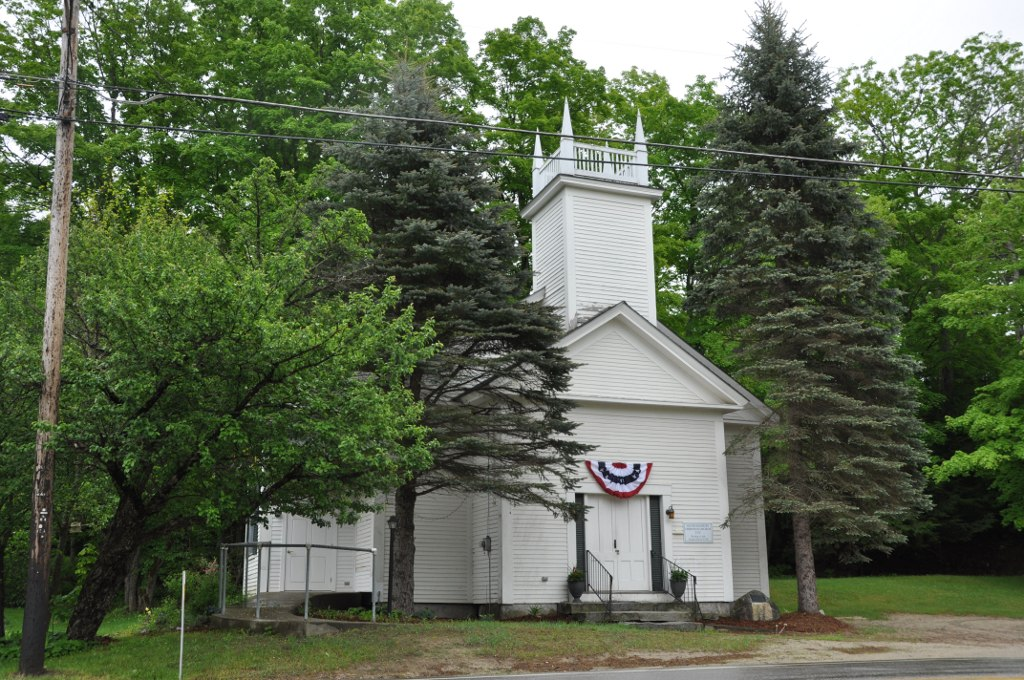

- Location within New Hampshire Location within the United States
- Location: 675 US 4, Danbury, New Hampshire
- Coordinates: 43°28′58″N 71°53′12″W
- Area: 0.3 acres (0.12 ha)
- Built: 1867
- Architect: Woodbury, John
- NRHP reference No.: 85001191
- Added to NRHP: June 06, 1985

South Danbury Christian Church is a historic church at 675 US 4 in Danbury, New Hampshire. Built in 1867, it is a little-altered and well-preserved example of a rural vernacular church. The building was listed on the National Register of Historic Places in 1985.

== Description and history ==
The South Danbury Christian Church is located in the rural village of South Danbury, on the east side of US 4 just north of its junction with Challenge Hill Road. It is a single-story wood-frame structure, with a gabled roof and clapboarded exterior. A gabled entry pavilion projects from the front facade, which is unadorned except for the entry and pedimented gable. The entry is a double-leaf door, flanked by sidelight windows and framed by simple moulding. Astride the main block and entry pavilion, a single-stage square tower rises to a flat top with corner pinnacles and a low balustrade. The interior is simply appointed, with carpeted floors, plaster walls with wide board wainscoting, and a pressed metal ceiling.

The building was constructed in 1867 by the local congregational society, which had been established the previous year. It was built by a local contractor, funds raised by the sale of pews. It has undergone relatively little exterior modification since. It has limited ornamentation, and is a good example of a rural vernacular 19th century church building. The only exterior changes of note are the replacement of the roof (1974), and the addition of electric lighting and a handrail. Interior changes were made around the turn of the 20th century, most of which are not detailed in church records.

== See also ==
- National Register of Historic Places listings in Merrimack County, New Hampshire
