= Bennett Farm (Henniker, New Hampshire) =

- U.S. National Register of Historic Places
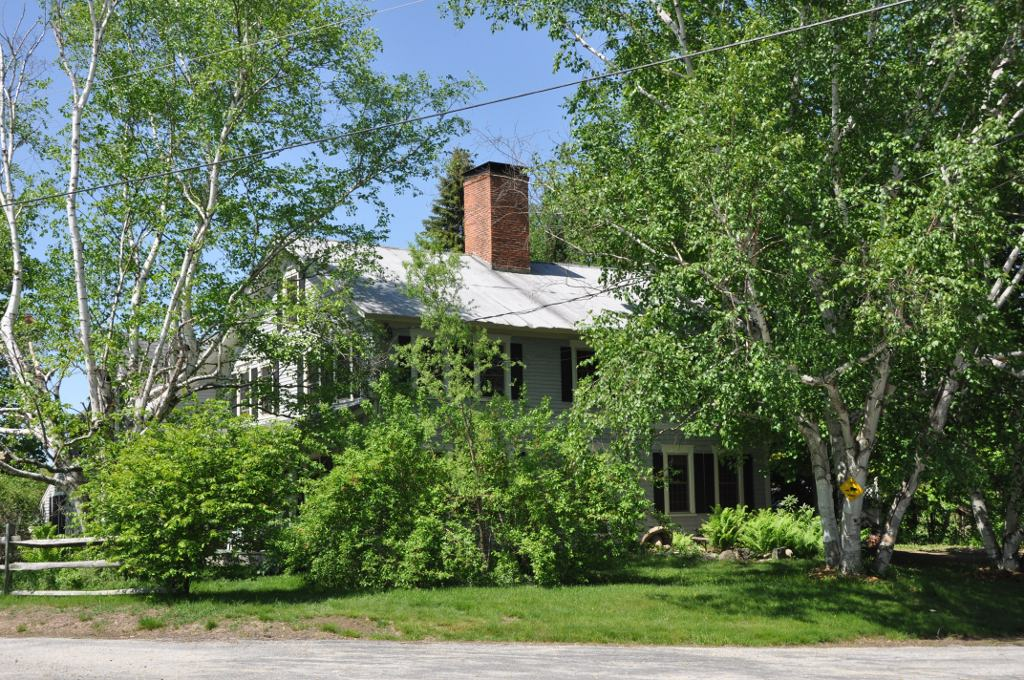
- The main house

- Location within New Hampshire Location within the United States
- Location: 11 Bennett Rd., Henniker, New Hampshire
- Coordinates: 43°10′14.6″N 71°47′22″W
- Area: 21 acres (8.5 ha)
- NRHP reference No.: 02000960
- Added to NRHP: September 14, 2002

Bennett Farm is a historic farmstead at 11 Bennett Road in Henniker, New Hampshire. The area has been farmed since the 1730s, when Henniker was laid out, and has been in the Bennett family for over a century. It is the oldest surviving farmstead in the rural community, and was listed on the National Register of Historic Places in 2002.

== Description and history ==
The Bennett Farm consists of 21 acres (8.5 ha) of land in eastern Henniker, roughly bounded by Elm Street, Bennett Road (aka Old Route 114), and New Hampshire Route 114. A narrow strip of cleared farmland lies north of Bennett Road, as does the main house. Additional cleared land is southwest of the Bennett Road/Elm Street junction, with the balance of the land wooded. The farmstead includes a number of buildings, the oldest of which is the c. 1780 main house. This building, a five-bay two-story wood frame with a large central chimney, was used as a tavern until the mid-19th century, when the property was converted to exclusively agricultural uses. The most unusual building on the property is the barn, which was originally built in 1834 as a religious meeting house, was moved to its present location in 1860 and then converted for use as a barn. Its steeple was blown off in 1937, leaving a cupola-like top.

The land making up the farm was first granted to John Clark in 1733. This property was purchased in 1779 by John Goodenow, who established a tavern the following year, and is the likely builder of the house. The property continued in use as a tavern until 1848, after which it was used exclusively for agricultural purposes. It has been owned since 1902 by the Bennett family, which originally had a diversified farm operation, including the raising of poultry and dairy cattle. In recent years the land has been farmed by neighbors.

== See also ==
- National Register of Historic Places listings in Merrimack County, New Hampshire
