= Dimond Hill Farm =

- U.S. National Register of Historic Places
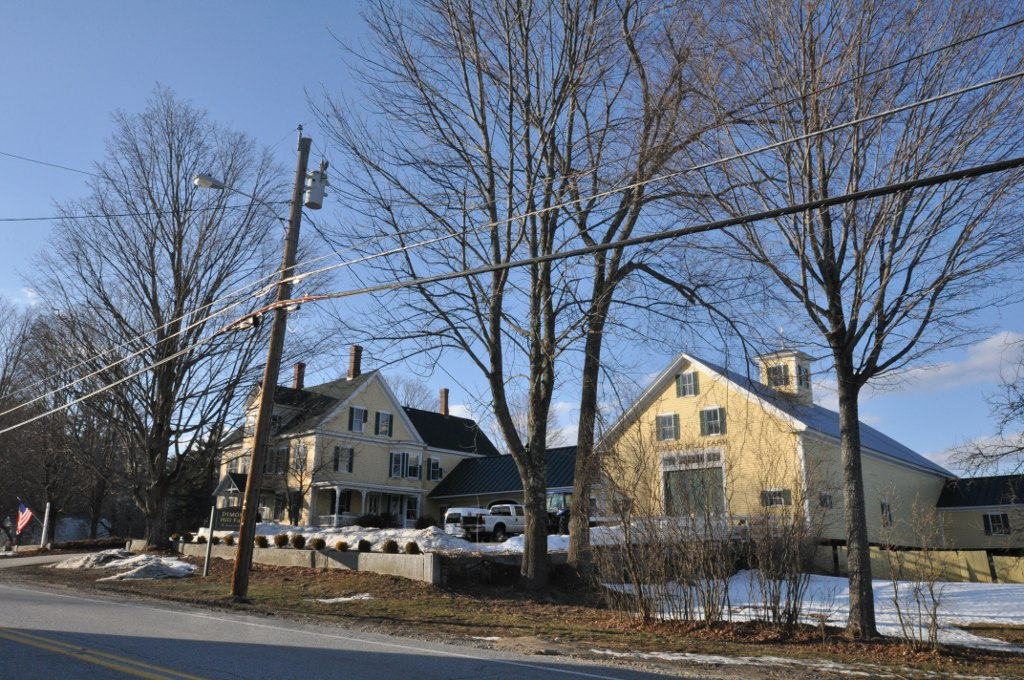

- Location within New Hampshire Location within the United States
- Location: 314 Hopkinton Rd., Concord, New Hampshire
- Coordinates: 43.19105°N 71.61769°W
- Area: 112 acres (45 ha)
- Built: 1827
- Built by: Hutchinson, E.B.
- Architectural style: Colonial Revival, Queen Anne
- NRHP reference No.: 07000155
- Added to NRHP: March 15, 2007

The Dimond Hill Farm is a historic farm at 314 Hopkinton Road (U.S. Route 202) in the western rural section of Concord, New Hampshire. Established on land that was first farmed by Ezekiel Dimond in the mid-18th century, this area has been farmed by the members of the Abbott-Presby family since 1827, and is one of the few remaining working farms in the city. The main house is an 1892 rambling structure that connects the family living space with the large barn, which dates to c. 1882. The oldest structure on the farm is a corn crib from the 1850s. The farm was listed on the National Register of Historic Places in 2007. The owners operate a farm stand on a seasonal basis.

== Description and history ==
The Dimond Hill Farm occupies about 112 acres (45 ha) of land in far western Concord, in a long rectangular strip roughly bisected by Hopkinton Road. The farmland is divided into agricultural fields, pastureland, and woodland, with the main farm building complex on the north side of the road. The main house is a large 2 1/2-story wood-frame structure, with Queen Anne and Colonial Revival features, which was built in 1892. Extending to the rear of the house are an ell and a combinational equipment shed and milk room. A barn stands near the house that is of similar vintage, and there is an 1850s corn crib behind the barn. On the south side of the road stands a shop building dating to the 1830s, and a modern storage building.

The property was first occupied about 1800, when Isaac Dimond built a house near the site of the present farmstead. The farming history of the property begins in 1827, when the property was acquired by Joseph Story Abbott, a third-generation farmer and housewright. In the early years the farm was probably a subsistence operation, but over the course of the 19th century dairy operations became a major part of its operations. Most of the buildings date to the ownership of Joseph's son Isaac, and were documented in a farm magazine in 1904. The property continues to be owned by Abbott descendants (now the Presby family).

== See also ==
- National Register of Historic Places listings in Merrimack County, New Hampshire
