= Henry J. Crippen House =

Historic house in New Hampshire, United States

- U.S. National Register of Historic Places
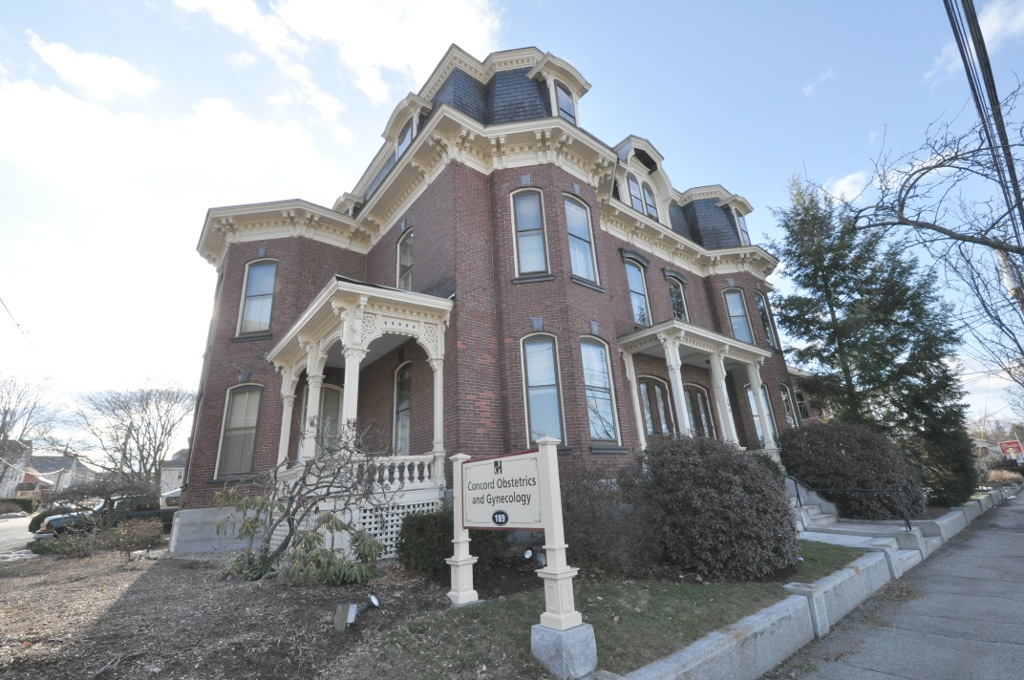

- Location within New Hampshire Location within the United States
- Location: 189-191 N. Main St., Concord, New Hampshire
- Coordinates: 43°12′45″N 71°32′26″W
- Area: 0.3 acres (0.12 ha)
- Built: 1879
- Built by: Brown, Lorenzo R.
- Architectural style: Second Empire
- NRHP reference No.: 83004204
- Added to NRHP: December 22, 1983

The Henry J. Crippen House is a historic two-family house at 189-191 North Main Street in Concord, New Hampshire. Built about 1879, it is one of a dwindling number of little-altered surviving Second Empire residences on the city's Main Street. Now converted to professional offices, it was listed on the National Register of Historic Places in 1983.

== Description and history ==
The Henry J. Crippen House is located north of downtown Concord, on the west side of North Main Street at its junction with Pearl Street. It is a 2 1/2-story masonry structure, with a mansard roof providing a full third floor in the attic level. The front facade is symmetrically arranged, with a pair of entry doors under a portico supported by wooden piers with recessed panel bases and brackets beneath the dentiled cornice. The doors and windows are all topped by segmented arches with cast iron keystones. The cornice of the roof is studded with paired heavy brackets and equally heavy dentil molding. Above the mansard portion of the roof is another band of molding. The paired entries are flanked on either side by projecting bays that rise a full two stories, and are topped in the mansard layer by dormers with projecting hoods. The south elevation of the house is distinguished from the north by the presence of a two-story half octagonal tower projection, in front of which is a side porch with ornately decorated balustrade and supports; the north facade has a simple two story projecting bay.

The house was built about 1879 by Lorenzo Brown, who sold one of its two units in 1878, and the other in 1879. The house is typical of mid-19th century Second Empire buildings that once lined North Main Street in larger numbers; most of them have either been demolished or altered significantly. The second unit's buyer was Henry J. Crippen, an English immigrant who became a prominent local railroad financier and educator. The Crippen family owned the house until 1955. In 1982, it underwent a historically sensitive rehabilitation for use as professional offices.

== See also ==
- National Register of Historic Places listings in Merrimack County, New Hampshire
