= Farrington House =

Historic house in New Hampshire, United States

- U.S. National Register of Historic Places
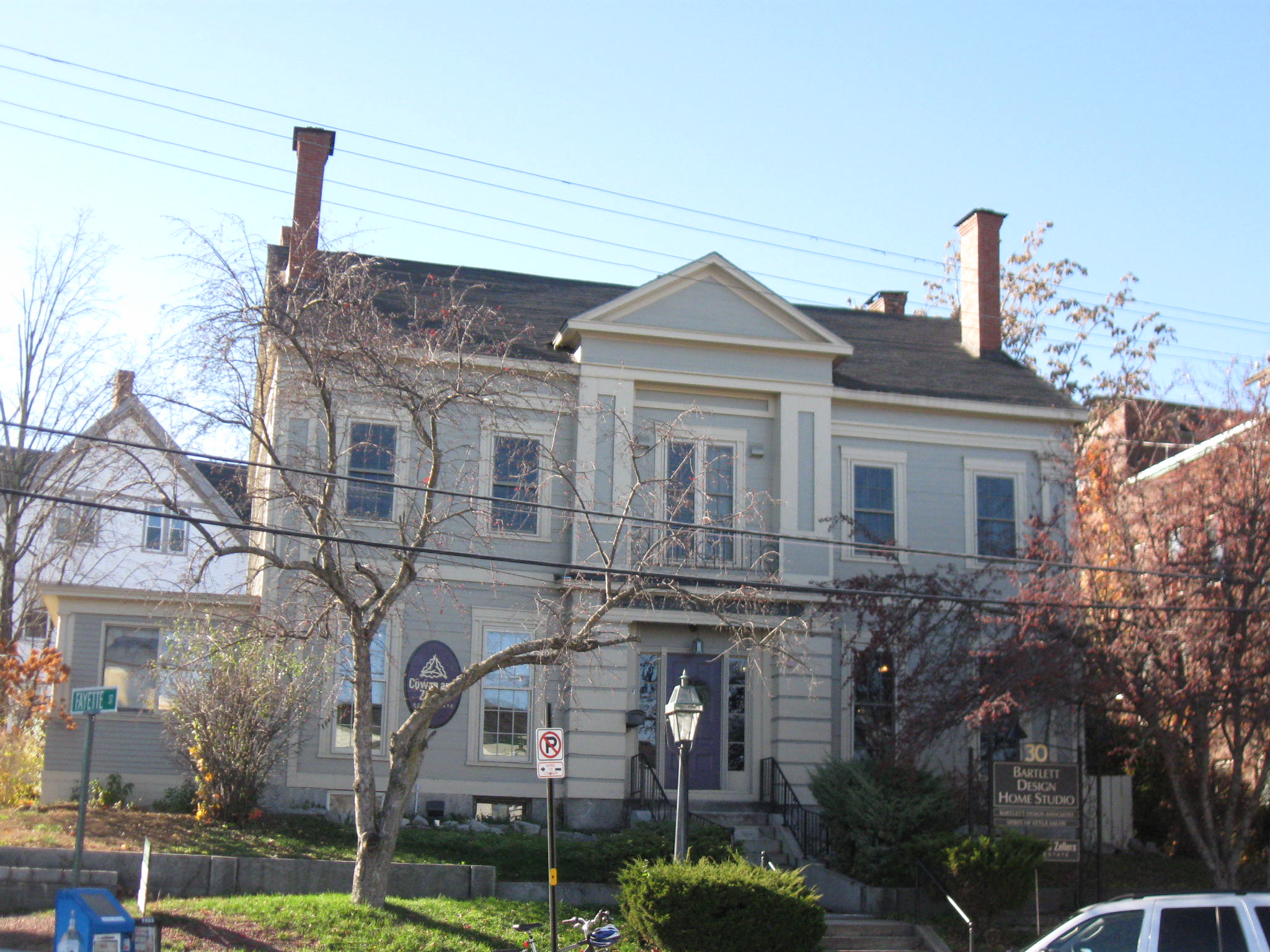

- Location within New Hampshire Location within the United States
- Location: 30 S. Main St., Concord, New Hampshire
- Coordinates: 43°12′11″N 71°32′44″W
- Area: less than one acre
- Built: 1844
- Built by: John Leach
- Architectural style: Greek Revival
- NRHP reference No.: 82001858
- Added to NRHP: March 9, 1982

The Farrington House is a historic house at 30 South Main Street in Concord, New Hampshire. Built in 1844 as a duplex, it is a distinctive local example of high-style Greek Revival architecture. It was listed on the National Register of Historic Places in 1982.

== Description and history ==
The Farrington House is located on the southern fringe of Concord's downtown commercial area, at the northwest corner of South Main Street with Fayette Street. It is a 2 1/2-story wood frame residence, with a gabled roof, brick end chimneys, and a mainly clapboarded exterior. The exterior is a conservative Greek Revival design, with side-gable roof flanked by paired chimneys on the sides. A gabled pavilion extending the full two stories shelters the recessed main entry, which has sidelight windows. The first level of the pavilion is styled in wood to appear as ashlar stone. The upper level has paneled pilasters supporting the pedimented gable. The property also includes a later Victorian brick carriage house.

Despite its outward appearance as a single family residence, this house was built in 1844 as a duplex for brothers Samuel and Philip Farrington. Its single door serves both units, and the central hall has parallel curving staircases, as well as entrances into the parlors of each unit. The unit division extends into the two-story rear ell. The house was built for the Farrington brothers by John Leach, a prominent architect-builder who worked throughout central New Hampshire. The brick carriage house was built during the ownership of Joseph Lund, a boatbuilder.

== See also ==
- National Register of Historic Places listings in Merrimack County, New Hampshire
