= Dr. Solomon M. Whipple House =

Historic house in New Hampshire, United States

- U.S. National Register of Historic Places
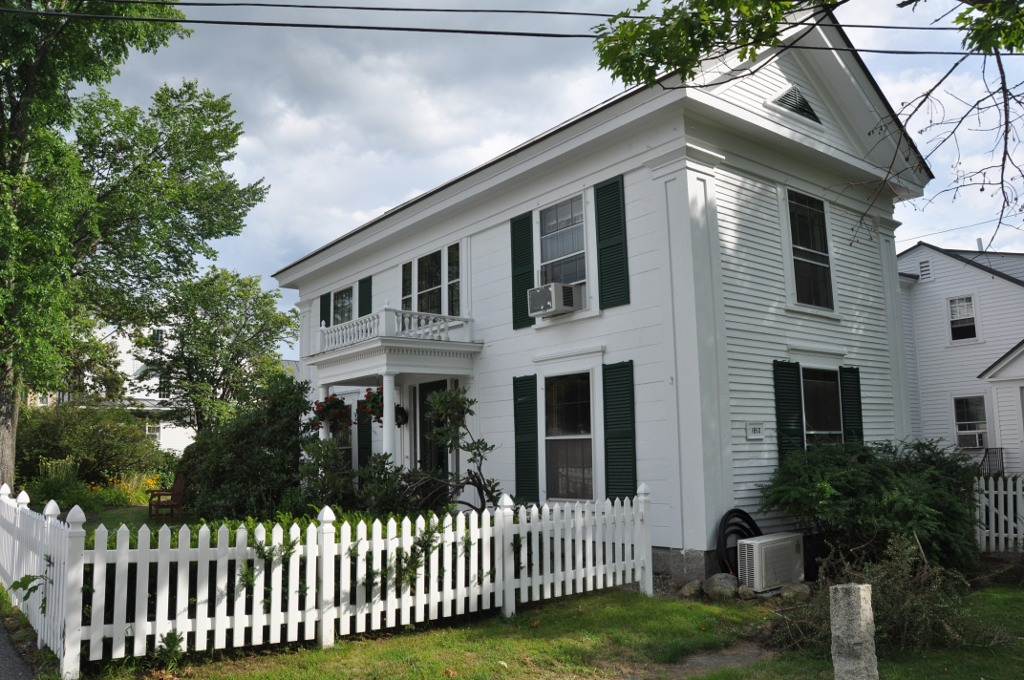

- Location within New Hampshire Location within the United States
- Location: Main St., New London, New Hampshire
- Coordinates: 43°24′48″N 71°59′5″W
- Area: 0.6 acres (0.24 ha)
- Built: 1850
- Architectural style: Greek Revival
- NRHP reference No.: 85002187
- Added to NRHP: September 12, 1985

The Dr. Solomon M. Whipple House, also known as the Clough or Woodward House, is a historic house on Main Street in the center of New London, New Hampshire. Built in 1850 for a long-serving doctor, it is the only Greek Revival house in the town. It was listed on the National Register of Historic Places in 1985. It is now the front portion of an assisted living facility.

== Description and history ==
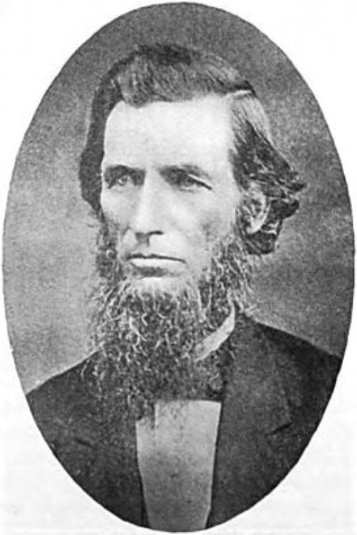
Solomon Mason Whipple

The Dr. Solomon M. Whipple House is located in the center of New London, on the south side of Main Street opposite the New London Inn. The two story wood-frame house has a side gable roof, with fully pedimented gable ends with triangular vents in the tympanum area. The front facade is three bays wide, with a center entry sheltered by a portico supported by Doric columns and topped by a low railing with turned balusters. The corner boards of the house are pilastered, and the front facade is finished with flushboarding scored to resemble ashlar stone. There is an addition to the rear, which was added by Dr. Whipple but extensively altered by later occupants. A large modern addition now also provides additional space for the property's use as an assisted living facility.

The house was built in 1850 for Dr. Solomon Whipple, who served for many years as the town's only physician, and remained in his family until 1941, when it was sold to another doctor. Dr. Whipple had his office in the house, and was a prominent statewide leader of the medical community, serving as president of the New Hampshire Medical Society in 1876. Whipple's children were also active in local civic affairs and business, donating Whipple Hall to the community, and establishing its first telephone company.

== See also ==
- National Register of Historic Places listings in Merrimack County, New Hampshire
