= Charles S. Hall House =

Historic house in New Hampshire, United States

- U.S. National Register of Historic Places
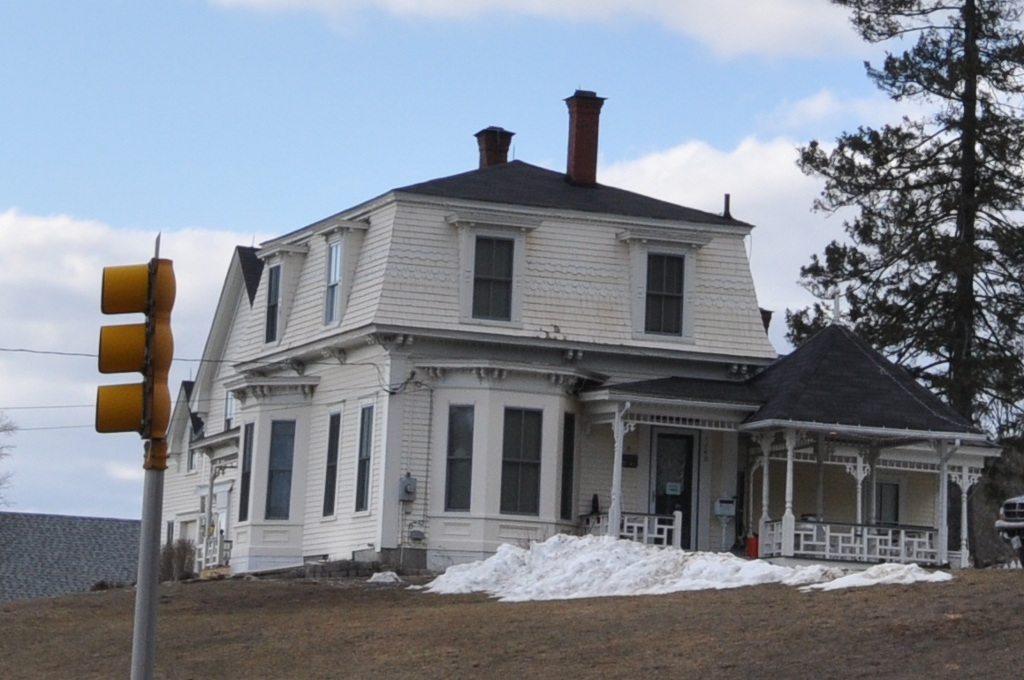

- Location within New Hampshire Location within the United States
- Location: 1740 Dover Rd., Epsom, New Hampshire
- Coordinates: 43°13′32″N 71°20′48″W
- Area: 3.8 acres (1.5 ha)
- Built: 1890
- Architectural style: Second Empire; Queen Anne
- NRHP reference No.: 02000640
- Added to NRHP: June 13, 2002

The Charles S. Hall House is a historic house at 1740 Dover Road (United States Route 4) in Epsom, New Hampshire. Built c. 1890, it is the only Second Empire building in the town, adorned further with Queen Anne features. The house was listed on the National Register of Historic Places in 2002.

== Description and history ==
The Charles S. Hall House is located near the western end of Epsom's elongated village center, on the north side of Dover Road near its junction with Black Hall Road. The house consists of a two-story mansard-roofed main block, which is connected to a large carriage barn by a kitchen ell. The steep portion of the main block's roof is covered in decoratively cut wood shingling, while the lower-pitched top section is clad in asphalt. There are dormers with projecting lintels on each of the main elevations. The front (south) and east elevations of the house each have projecting polygonal bay windows topped by a cornice with paired brackets, a feature that is repeated in the main roof line. A gazebo with Stick style decoration is attached to a porch that extends across the east elevation.

The house was either built or extensively altered for Charles S. Hall in about 1890. Hall, a native of Epsom, had engaged in a number of businesses, and eventually became the town's largest taxpayer. He was also involved in civic affairs, donating funds for the construction of the public library, serving as town clerk, and serving in the state legislature. By the 1920s, he had moved out of the house (and into a hotel he owned), which was eventually sold to his brother and nephew.

== See also ==
- National Register of Historic Places listings in Merrimack County, New Hampshire
