= Donald D. Tuttle House =

Historic house in New Hampshire, United States

- U.S. National Register of Historic Places
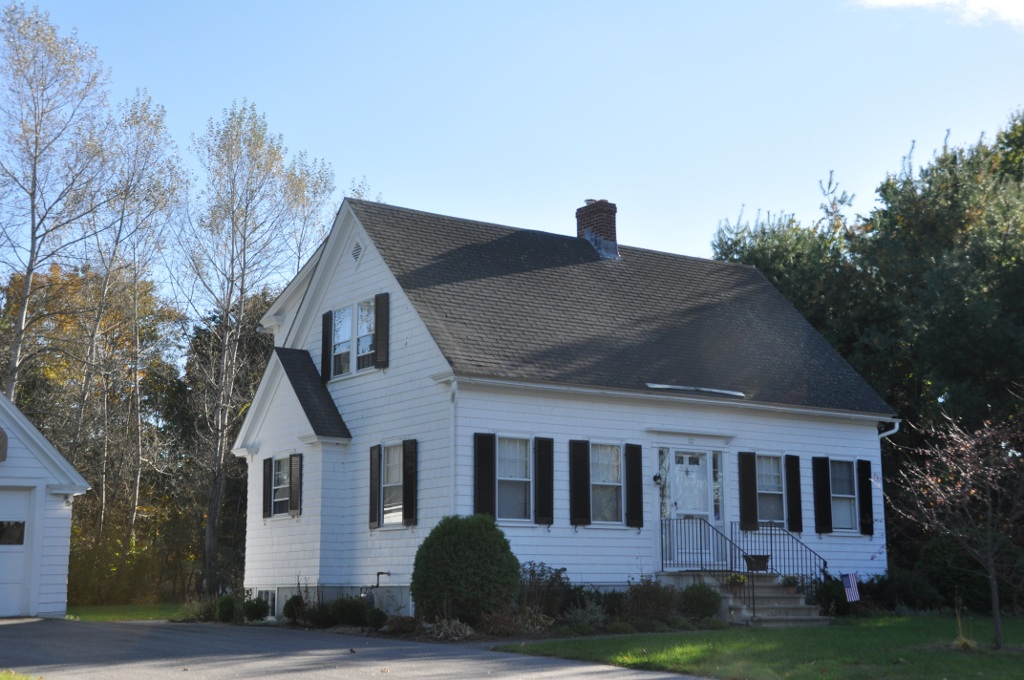

- Location within New Hampshire Location within the United States
- Location: 12 Gabby Ln., Concord, New Hampshire
- Coordinates: 43°10′34″N 71°32′13″W
- Built: 1933
- Built by: Blake, Frank, & Louis
- Architectural style: Colonial Revival
- NRHP reference No.: 95001052
- Added to NRHP: August 31, 1995

The Donald D. Tuttle House is a historic house at 12 Gabby Lane in Concord, New Hampshire. Built in 1933, it is a well-preserved example of a modest Cape-style house with Colonial Revival features. It is historically significant for its association with Donald D. Tuttle, who pioneered the promotion of alpine skiing in the state. The house was listed on the National Register of Historic Places in 1995. The house was moved from its original location on Pleasant Street in 2009, in order make way for a road project.

== Description and history ==
The Donald D. Tuttle House stands in a small residential subdivision in southern Concord, on the south side of Gabby Lane east of South Street. It is a 1½-story wood-frame structure, with a side gable roof and clapboarded exterior. The main facade is five bays wide, with a center entrance flanked by sidelight windows and pilasters, and topped by a corniced entablature. A small gabled section protrudes on the left side, and the rear roof face is largely extended by a wide shed-roof dormer. A garage stands to the left of the house.

This modest house was built in 1933 by Louis and Frank Blake. The house is most significant as the home of Donald D. Tuttle from 1935 to 1945. Tuttle was hired by the state in 1925 as its publicity director, heading a department that over time became the State Planning and Development Commission. He was a leader in promoting tourism in the state, in particular downhill skiing. Due in part to his efforts, the state constructed the Cannon Mountain Tramway (1934–38). The house was moved to Gabby Lane in 2009 to make way for the Langley Parkway.

== See also ==
- National Register of Historic Places listings in Merrimack County, New Hampshire
