= Pillsbury Memorial Hall =

- U.S. National Register of Historic Places
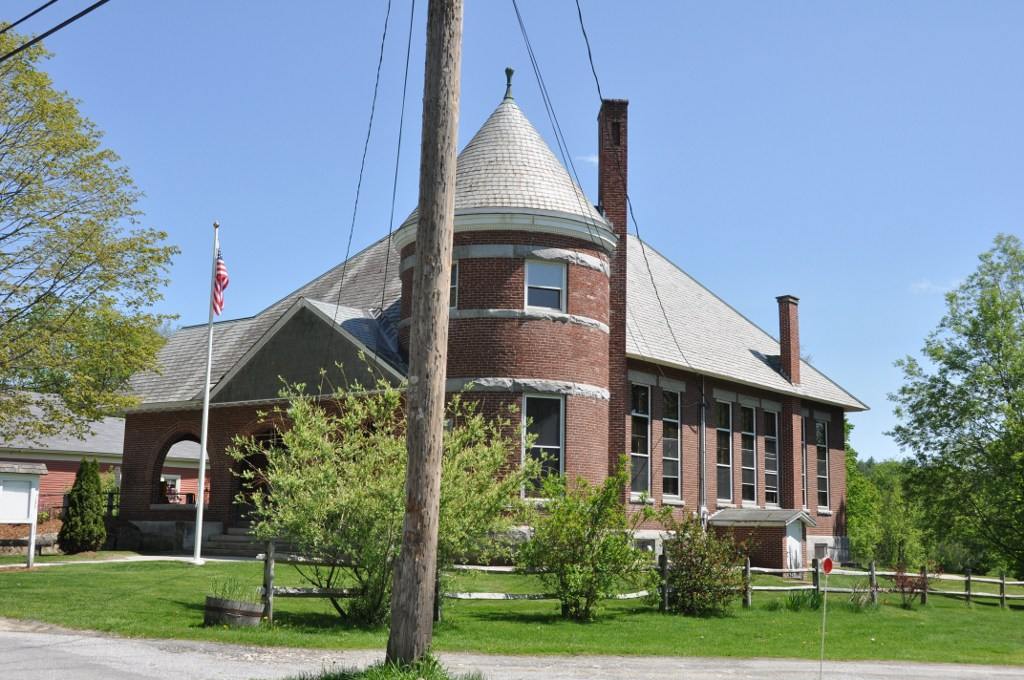

- Location within New Hampshire Location within the United States
- Location: 93 Main St., Sutton, New Hampshire
- Coordinates: 43°20′2″N 71°57′13″W
- Area: less than one acre
- Built: 1891
- Architect: Leroy S. Buffington
- Architectural style: Romanesque
- NRHP reference No.: 93000147
- Added to NRHP: March 4, 1993

Pillsbury Memorial Hall, located at 93 Main Street, is the town hall of Sutton, New Hampshire. It was built in 1891, funded by a gift from New Hampshire native John Sargent Pillsbury, founder of the Pillsbury Company and a leading Minnesota politician. It is the only Romanesque style town hall building in Merrimack County. The building was listed on the National Register of Historic Places in 1993.

== Description and history ==
Pillsbury Memorial Hall is located in the village center of Sutton, on the south side of Main Street east of Newbury Road. It is a single-story masonry structure, built out of brick and granite. Romanesque features include a two-story turret at the front, capped by a pyramidal roof, an arcade of rounded arches forming a recessed porch to its left that extends around to the side. The main hall of the building, where town meetings are held, is a single story element at its rear, with the selectmen's office on the ground floor of the tower, and a large steel vault between it and the auditorium. A room originally used as a library is located in the northeast corner.

The hall was built in 1891 to a design by Minnesota architect Leroy S. Buffington. The building was a gift of John Sargent Pillsbury, who was born in Sutton before achieving business and political success in Minnesota. Sutton had previously held its town meetings in private homes (from incorporation in 1749 until the 1790s), alternating in two privately erected meetinghouses until the 1830s, and then a variety of locations prior to construction of this hall. It has served as the center of town government since.

== See also ==
- National Register of Historic Places listings in Merrimack County, New Hampshire
