= First Congregational Church of Boscawen =

Historic church in New Hampshire, United States

- U.S. National Register of Historic Places
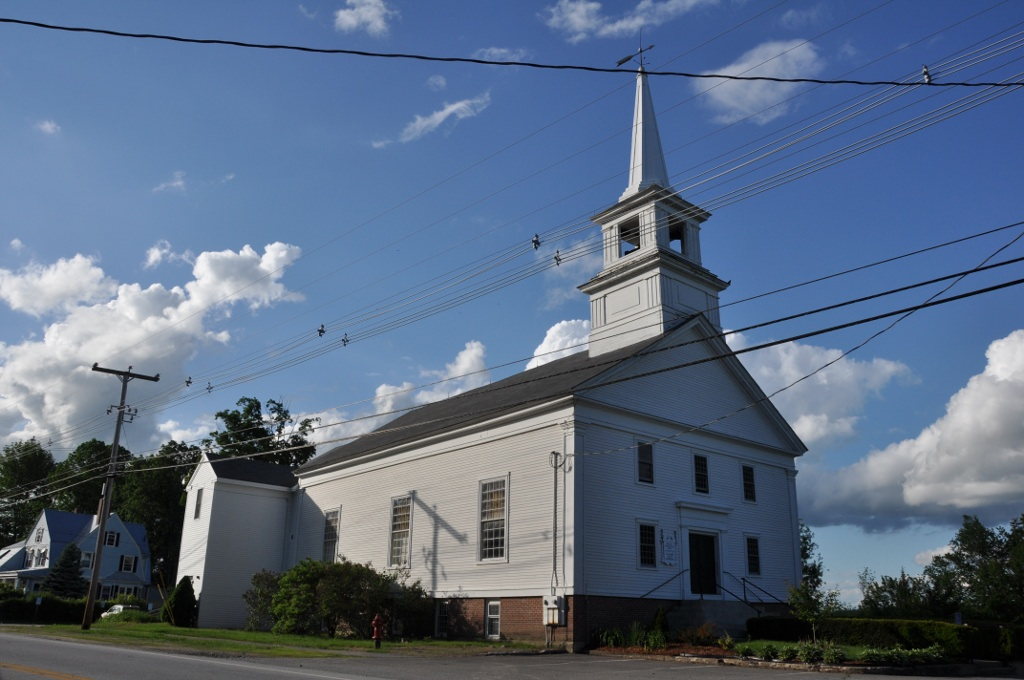

- Location within New Hampshire Location within the United States
- Location: 12 High St., Boscawen, New Hampshire
- Coordinates: 43°19′19″N 71°37′45″W
- Area: 1 acre (0.40 ha)
- Built: 1799
- Architectural style: Greek Revival
- NRHP reference No.: 82001689
- Added to NRHP: April 19, 1982

The First Congregational Church of Boscawen is a historic church at 12 High Street in Boscawen, New Hampshire. Built in 1799, the wood-frame church was significantly altered in 1839, when it acquired its present Greek Revival character. It is one of the few surviving meeting houses in New Hampshire that continues to combine religious and municipal functions; it basement space is used for town meetings and elections. The building was listed on the National Register of Historic Places in 1982.

== Architecture and history ==
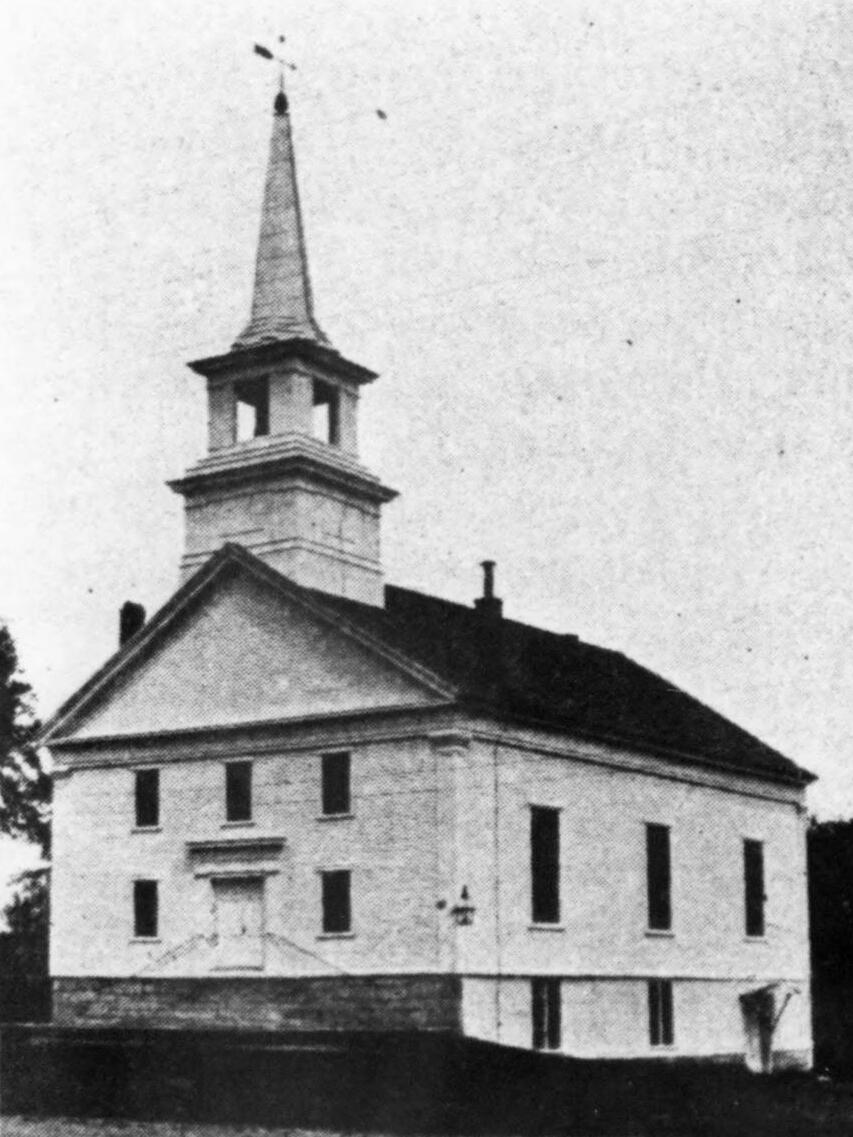
First Congregational Church, Boscawen, c. 1909

The First Congregational Church of Boscawen occupies a prominent location on the north side of the community's main village, at the junction of High and King streets (U.S. Routes 4 and 3 respectively). It is a two-story wood-frame structure, with a gabled roof and clapboarded exterior. Its front facade, facing south toward the road junction, is modeled as a Greek temple, with corner pilasters supporting an entablature consisting of an architrave, plain frieze, and moulded cornice. This entablature is continued around the two sides of the building. The church tower rises from the center of the front facade, and consists of three stages: the first stage is an enclosed square with a single small window in its rear face, the second is an open belfry surrounded by pilastered supports, to which the octagonal steeple is mounted.

The church was built in 1799, originally serving both civic and religious functions in the manner of a traditional colonial meeting house. It was oriented with the main entrance on the long side, facing south. In 1839, the building underwent a major renovation, which included rotating the building 90°, placing the main entrance on a short side, removing the box pews in favor of the present slip pews, and removing the traditional high pulpit and sounding board. The municipal functions were also at this time moved out of the building, until 1847. The town then petitioned the congregation for permission to establish a town meeting space in the basement, by raising the building several feet. This proposal was agreed and implemented, and the basement space continues to be used by the town for election polling and other functions (although its offices are in another building). In 1940, the building was again rotated 90°, this time to accommodate realignment of US 3.

== See also ==
- National Register of Historic Places listings in Merrimack County, New Hampshire
