= Gershom Durgin House =

United States historic house

- U.S. National Register of Historic Places
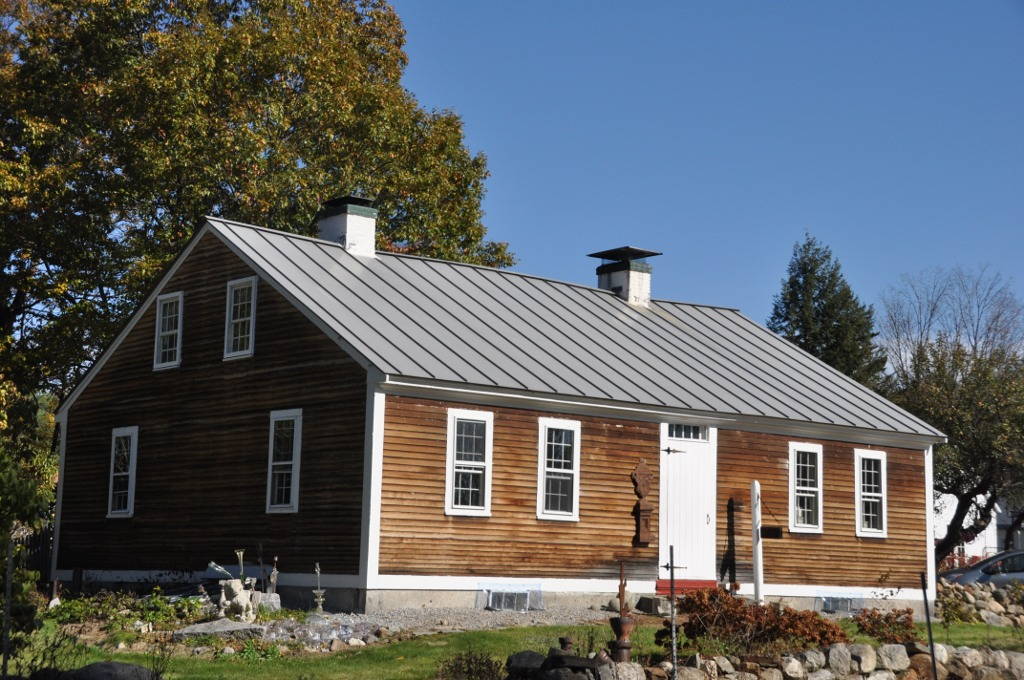

- Location within New Hampshire Location within the United States
- Location: 391 Franklin Hwy., Andover, New Hampshire
- Coordinates: 43°26′34″N 71°46′14″W
- Area: 1.7 acres (0.69 ha)
- Built: 1815
- Built by: Gershom Durgin
- Architectural style: Cape Cod
- NRHP reference No.: 00001463
- Added to NRHP: December 1, 2000

The Gershom Durgin House is a historic house at 391 Franklin Highway in Andover, New Hampshire. Probably built between 1808 and 1820, it is a well-preserved example of an early 19th-century Cape Cod style house. It was listed on the National Register of Historic Places in 2000.

== Description and history ==
The Gershom Durgin House is located in a rural setting in central eastern Andover, on the north side of Franklin Highway (New Hampshire Route 11), just west of its junction with Agony Hill Road. It is a 1 1/2-story wood-frame structure, resting on a granite foundation, with a side-gable roof, two interior chimneys, and a clapboarded exterior. Its main facade is five bays wide, with a center entrance consisting of a board door fastened by metal hinges, with a four-light transom window above. The interior follows a Federal period central hall plan, a central hall flanked by parlor spaces on either side, and the kitchen in the northeast. The southwest parlor has the finest woodwork, with a Federal style fireplace surround, wall paneling, and trim. Just northeast of the building stands a 19th-century barn, which has a saltbox profile.

The exact construction date of the house is not known. The property's first documented owner, Gershom Durgin, was a clockmaker who moved here from Hanover between 1808 and 1820, and it is assumed that he built this house. It is a well-preserved example of the Cape Cod style, and is notable locally as an example of a single-story double house with two rooms deep and two chimneys, a plan more often found in two-story houses of the period in New Hampshire. Durgin never married, and the house was inherited by his sisters upon his death in 1851. The house passed out of the family in 1893.

== See also ==
- National Register of Historic Places listings in Merrimack County, New Hampshire
