= Morrill-Lassonde House =

Historic house in New Hampshire, United States

- U.S. National Register of Historic Places
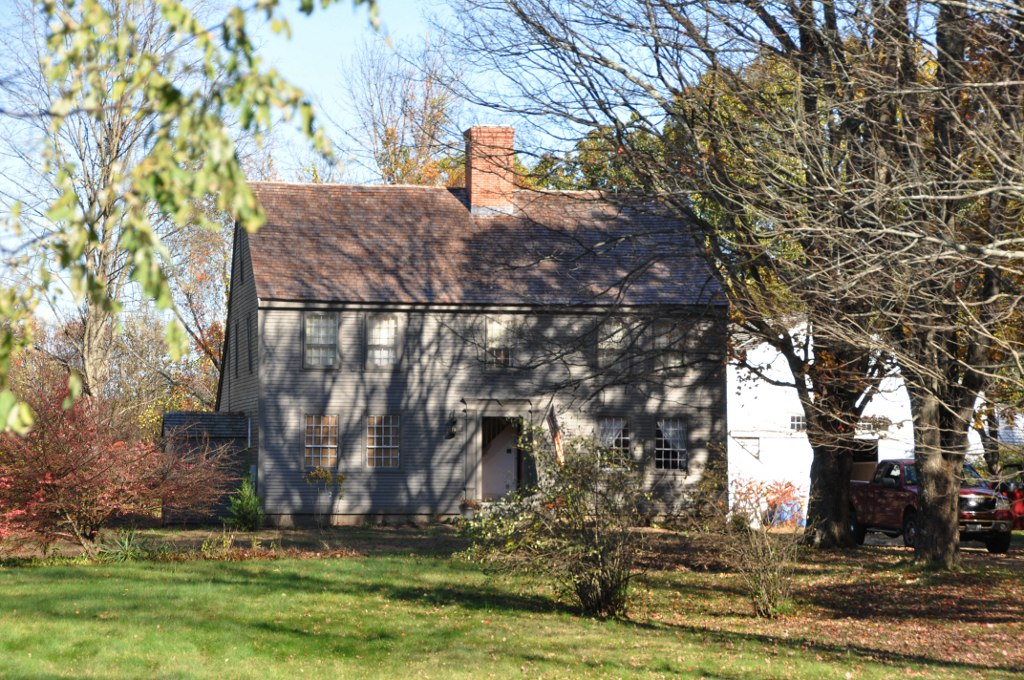

- Location within New Hampshire Location within the United States
- Location: 150 King St., Boscawen, New Hampshire
- Coordinates: 43°18′38″N 71°36′52″W
- Area: 2.8 acres (1.1 ha)
- Built: 1769
- Architectural style: Greek Revival
- NRHP reference No.: 84003216
- Added to NRHP: March 15, 1984

The Morrill-Lassonde House is a historic house at 150 King Street in Boscawen, New Hampshire. Built about 1769, it is believed to be the oldest surviving house in the town. Historically significant residents include clock mechanism inventor Benjamin Morrill and artist Omer T. Lassonde, a founder of the New Hampshire Art Association. The house was listed on the National Register of Historic Places in 1984. Given by Lassonde's widow to the New Hampshire Art Association, it is now in private ownership.

== Description and history ==
The Morrill-Lassonde House is located in southeastern Boscawen, on the east side of King Street (U.S. Route 3, roughly opposite its junction with Berle Drive. It is a 2½-story wood-frame structure, with a gabled roof, central chimney, and clapboarded exterior, set well back from the road and overlooking the floodplain of the Merrimack River. Its front façade is five bays wide, with the entrance at the center, flanked by a Greek Revival surround of pilasters and corniced entablature.

The house was built c. 1769 for Rev. Robie Morrill, and is believed to be the oldest surviving structure in Boscawen. It is also thought to occupy the site of the oldest fortification in the town. Morrill's grandson Benjamin invented the wheelbarrow clock movement in this house. In the 20th century, the house was owned by artist Omer T. Lassonde, a New Hampshire native who played a leading role in arts organizations in the state from the 1930s to his death in 1980 and cofounded the New Hampshire Art Association. He eventually donated the house, along with his furnishings and studio, to the New Hampshire Art Association.

== See also ==
- Hill–Lassonde House, another home of Omer Lassonde in Manchester (demolished)
- National Register of Historic Places listings in Merrimack County, New Hampshire
