= Boscawen Public Library =

- U.S. National Register of Historic Places
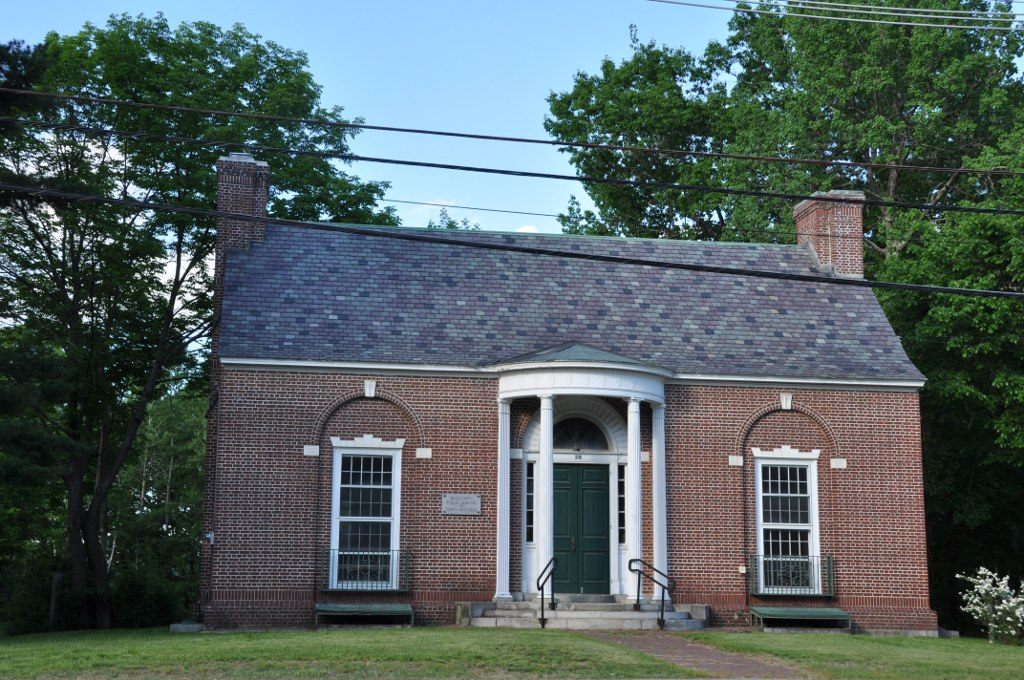

- Location within New Hampshire Location within the United States
- Location: 248 King St., Boscawen, New Hampshire
- Coordinates: 43°19′9″N 71°37′31″W
- Area: less than one acre
- Built: 1912
- Architect: Lowell, Guy
- Architectural style: Colonial Revival
- NRHP reference No.: 81000073
- Added to NRHP: May 28, 1981

The Boscawen Public Library is the public library of Boscawen, New Hampshire, United States. It is located at 116 North Main Street. The library's first building, built in 1913 at 248 King Street to a Colonial Revival design by Guy Lowell, was listed on the National Register of Historic Places in 1981, and is slowly undergoing rehabilitation.

== First building ==
The library's original building is located in the elongated village center of Boscawen, on the east side of King Street (United States Route 3) just south of its junction with United States Route 4. It is a single-story brick building, with a gabled roof and end chimneys with recessed brick paneling. Its main facade is three bays wide and symmetrical, with a center entrance and flanking sash windows. The windows are set in recessed round-arch panels with marble keystone and impost blocks, and extend all the way to ground level, with a splayed stone lintel. The entrance is also in a rounded opening, with sidelight windows and a half-round transom above. The entry is sheltered by a projecting half-round portico, supported by round columns and fluted pilasters. The interior has original marble floors and oak paneled walls that have pilasters rising to entablatures beneath a coved plaster ceiling.

The building was completed in 1913 to a design by architect Guy Lowell, with funding provided by the Kimball brothers, who were prominent local businessmen, and land donated by Frank Gerrish. It is one of New Hampshire's finest examples of small-scale Colonial Revival architecture.

The library moved to its present location in 2006, and the old library was closed; the town is, as of 2017, undertaking rehabilitation of the building, and considering future uses.

== See also ==
- National Register of Historic Places listings in Merrimack County, New Hampshire
