= Boscawen Academy and Much-I-Do Hose House =

- U.S. National Register of Historic Places
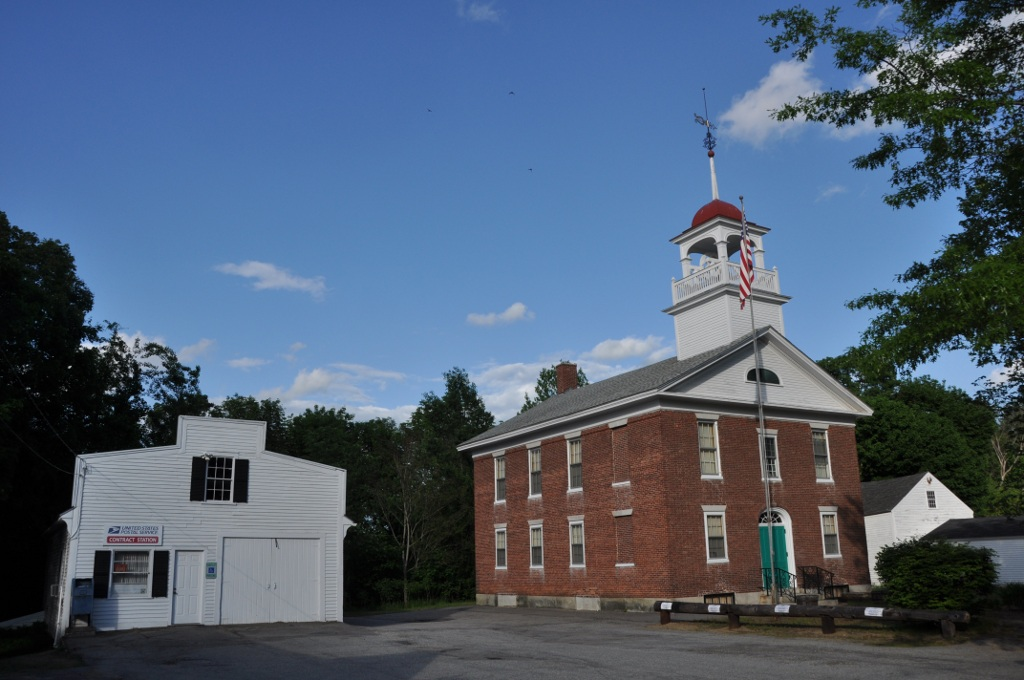
- Hose house on the left, academy on the right

- Location within New Hampshire Location within the United States
- Location: King St., Boscawen, New Hampshire
- Coordinates: 43°19′3″N 71°37′20″W
- Area: 0.8 acres (0.32 ha)
- Built: 1827
- Built by: Abbott, William
- Architectural style: Federal
- NRHP reference No.: 80000292
- Added to NRHP: December 8, 1980

The Boscawen Academy and Much-I-Do Hose House are a pair of historic civic buildings in Boscawen, New Hampshire. Now owned by the Boscawen Historical Society, these two buildings played a significant role in the civic history of the town for over 150 years, and were listed on the National Register of Historic Places in 1980.

== Boscawen Academy ==
The Boscawen Academy was a private school chartered by the state of New Hampshire in 1827 as part of a general plan to improve secondary education. This two story Federal style brick building was constructed in 1827-28 by William Abbot, a local joiner who also built a number of other civic buildings in central New Hampshire. The brick exterior is laid in common bond, with a header course every eight rows. It has a low pitch gable roof whose pedimented end, above the front facade, has a fanlight window. The front facade is three bays wide, with a central door topped by a fanlight transom. The side walls are four bays long; the first window on each side has been bricked over, apparently as part of 19th century alterations to the stairwells inside. Centered above the front entry is a two-stage tower: it has a square base, above which is an open belfry supported by four posts and surrounded by a balustrade. The tower is topped by a four-sided cupola and weathervane.

The inside of the academy has been relatively unaltered since the 19th century. Each level has one large classroom, and the front of the building has a pair of staircases rising on either side of the front door. There is a small room at the top of the stairs on the second floor. The building was remodeled in 1858, giving some of its interior finishes a Greek Revival flavor, and again sometime after 1872.

The academy was operated as a private school until 1872, when the building was sold to the Boscawen Public Schools for $2,000. It was operated as a public school until 1966, after which it was sold to the Boscawen Historical Society.

== Much-I-Do Hose House ==
The "Much-I-Do" Hose House is a modest single story wood-frame building located just north of the academy building. When built in 1893, the building was about half its present size, and was built to store the hoses of Boscawen's number 2 fire company (which was dubbed "Much-I-Do" in 1904). In 1922 its size was doubled to accommodate the housing of a fire truck, and overhead doors were added to the front at a later date. It was used as a fire station until 1969, and as the local police station from 1971 to 1973. It was then given to the Boscawen Historical Society, which leases half the building to serve as the local post office, while using the other half for storage.

== See also ==
- National Register of Historic Places listings in Merrimack County, New Hampshire
