= Leavitt Farm =

- U.S. National Register of Historic Places
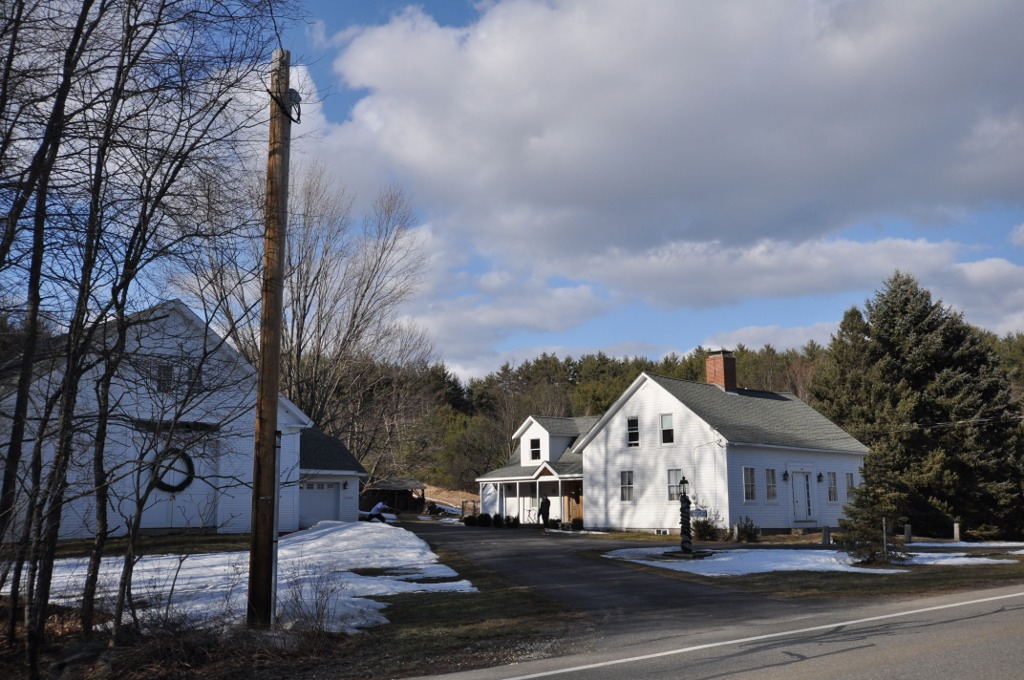

- Location within New Hampshire Location within the United States
- Location: 103 Old Loudon Rd., Concord, New Hampshire
- Coordinates: 43°13′56″N 71°28′52″W
- Area: 12.7 acres (5.1 ha)
- Built: 1847
- Architectural style: Greek Revival
- NRHP reference No.: 82001692
- Added to NRHP: March 11, 1982

Leavitt Farm is a historic farmstead at 103 Old Loudon Road in eastern Concord, New Hampshire. It consists of three 19th-century farm buildings, including the c. 1847 Greek Revival farmhouse, a large c. 1888 shop and barn, and a 19th-century privy which has been converted into a well pumphouse. These buildings were built by Jonathan Leavitt, a farmer and blacksmith, and were later owned by his son Almah, a sign painter. In the 1980s the property was used by the Concord Coach Society (now the Abbot-Downing Historical Society) as a headquarters and museum facility. The shop building in particular is notable for its adaptive reuse (as blacksmithy, paint shop, and museum), and for its second floor ballroom space, an unusual location for that type of social space. The property was listed on the National Register of Historic Places in 1982.

== Description and history ==
Leavitt Farm is located in an increasingly less rural area of eastern Concord, on the north side of Old Loudon Road a short way west of its junction with Loudon Road (New Hampshire Route 9). The farm now consists of about 12.7 acres (5.1 ha), bounded on the north by Interstate 393. The buildings are clustered near Old Loudon Road, with the house at the center, the barn to the left, the shop to the right, and the pumphouse behind the house. The house is a 1½-story Cape-style structure, with a gabled roof, central chimney, and clapboarded exterior. Its main entrance is flanked by sidelight windows, and is topped by a decorative panel incised with stars. The barn is finished in wooden clapboards and has an L shape, with the main gable facing the road and entrances facing front and right in the crook of the L. The shop is a two-story frame structure, with a utilitarian ground floor, and a ballroom on the upper level, finished in plaster with stencil decoration.

The property was developed by Jonathan Leavitt, who bought the land in 1847. Initially a farmer, in his later years he also worked as a blacksmith, work he performed in the shop building. It is likely that he hosted social events for the community in the ballroom on the shop's second floor. Leavitt's son Almah, who purchased the property from his father in 1888, used the shop to paint carriages and signs. In 1980, the property was purchased by a local historical society and adapted for use as a museum devoted to carriages. The society has since relocated to facilities at the fairgrounds in Hopkinton; this is now private property.

== See also ==
- National Register of Historic Places listings in Merrimack County, New Hampshire
