= Chamberlin House (Concord, New Hampshire) =

Historic house in New Hampshire, United States

- U.S. National Register of Historic Places
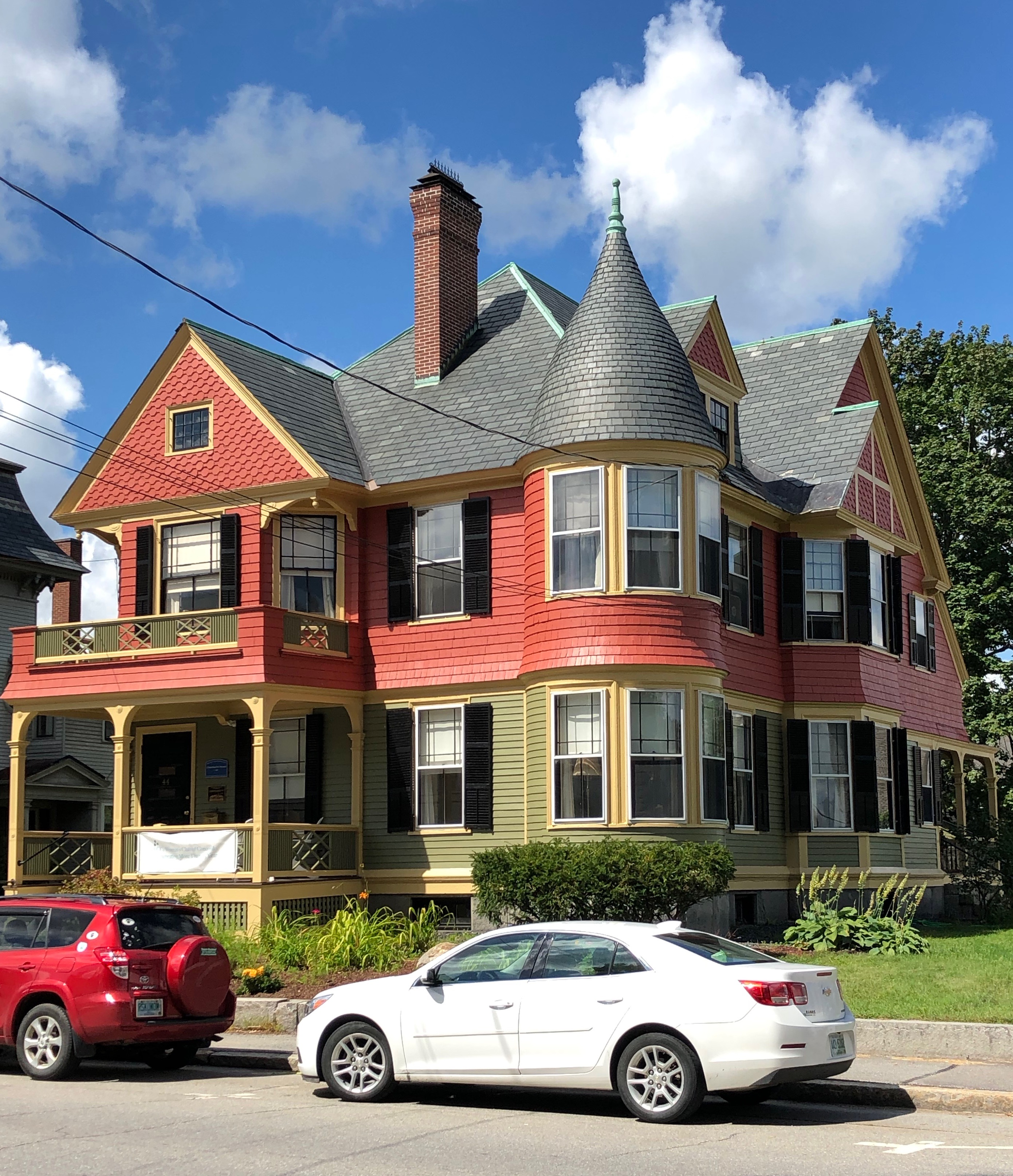

- Location within New Hampshire Location within the United States
- Location: 44 Pleasant St., Concord, New Hampshire
- Coordinates: 43°12′12″N 71°32′19″W
- Area: 0.3 acres (0.12 ha)
- Built: 1886
- Architect: Cooperative Building Plan Assoc.
- Architectural style: Queen Anne, Shingle Style
- NRHP reference No.: 82001688
- Added to NRHP: August 16, 1982

The Chamberlin House is a historic house at 44 Pleasant Street in Concord, New Hampshire. Built in 1886, it is a prominent local example of Queen Anne architecture built from mail-order plans, and now serves as the clubhouse of the Concord Women's Club. It was listed on the National Register of Historic Places in 1982.

== Description and history ==
The Chamberlin House stands on the north side of Pleasant Street (US 202/NH 9), in a line of residences extending westward from the city's commercial downtown area. The 2 1/2-story wood frame Queen Anne Victorian was built in 1886 by Horace Chamberlin, superintendent of the local division of the Boston and Maine Railroad. Although the house was probably built from mail-order plans (a popular way to acquire building plans at the time), it exhibits a wealth of Queen Anne and Shingle Style decoration, both inside and out. The house has a hip roof, but there are numerous projections, including a turret with conical roof on the right side of the front facade. The left side has a single story porch, decorated with Stick style balustrades both below and above the roof. Above the porch is a projecting bay window which is topped by a large gable that extends over the splayed corners of the bay, where there are curved brackets. The gable front is sheathed in decoratively cut shingles, with a small square window in the center.

The house remained in the Chamberlin family until Horace's wife died in 1918. Since the family had no children, she donated the property to the Concord Women's Club, of which she had been a longtime member. The club uses the building as its clubhouse; its interior, which is rich in detailed woodwork and styling, has been only modestly altered to accommodate the club's needs.

== See also ==
- National Register of Historic Places listings in Merrimack County, New Hampshire
