= South Sutton Meeting House =

Historic church in New Hampshire, United States

- U.S. National Register of Historic Places
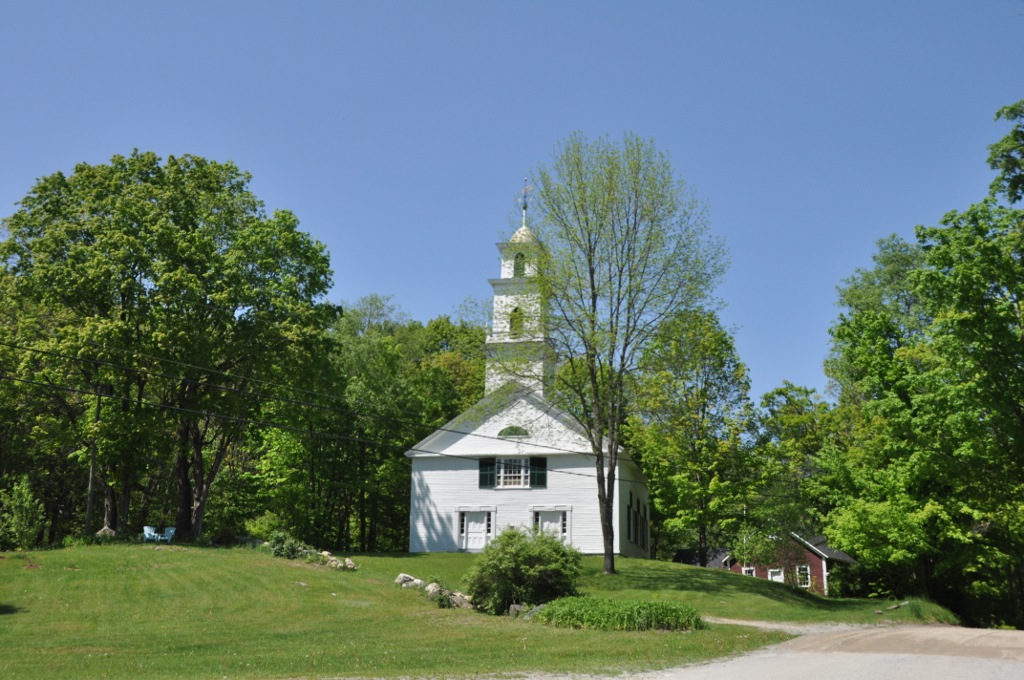

- Location within New Hampshire Location within the United States
- Location: 17 Meeting House Hill Rd., South Sutton, New Hampshire
- Coordinates: 43°19′14″N 71°56′7″W
- Area: 1 acre (0.40 ha)
- Built: 1839
- Architectural style: Greek Revival
- NRHP reference No.: 93000462
- Added to NRHP: May 27, 1993

The South Sutton Meeting House is a historic meeting house at 17 Meeting House Hill Road in South Sutton, New Hampshire. The wood-frame building was constructed in 1839, and is a well-preserved example of rural vernacular Greek Revival architecture. It was listed on the National Register of Historic Places in 1993.

== Description and history ==
The South Sutton Meeting House is sited atop a knoll overlooking the village, on the west side of Meeting House Hill Road. Facing south, it is a 1 1/2-story wood-frame structure, with a gabled roof. Its walls are sheathed in clapboards and rest on a granite foundation. Its main facade has two entries, each of which is flanked by sidelight windows and framed by a moulded casing based on designs published by Asher Benjamin. The gable end is an enclosed pediment, whose tympanum has a fan that screens an attic window. There is a single window above the paired doorways. The building has been little altered since its construction; the only significant modification has been the digging of a cellar in which to install a furnace, done c. 1899, and the repair of lightning-related damage.

The meeting house was built in 1839 for the local Congregationalist congregation. It is fairly typical of many churches built across southern and central New Hampshire in the second quarter of the 19th century, a building spurt occasioned by state legislation mandating the separation of church and civic functions, passed in 1819. Of these, it is among the least altered: most have had stylistic alterations made such as the introduction of stained glass windows or a remodeling of the interior in the late 19th century, or have had additions made to them.

== See also ==
- National Register of Historic Places listings in Merrimack County, New Hampshire
