= Beaver Meadow Brook Archeological Site =

- Beaver Meadow Brook Archeological Site (27MR3)
- U.S. National Register of Historic Places
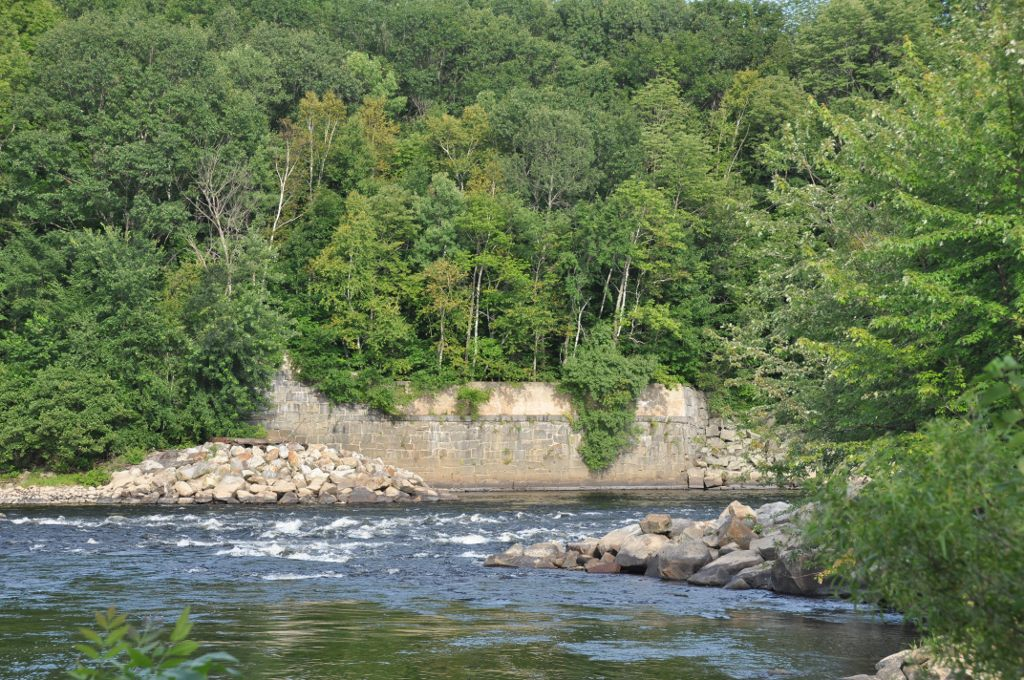
- The old Sewall's Falls dam
- Nearest city: Concord, New Hampshire
- Area: 1 acre (0.40 ha)
- NRHP reference No.: 89000434
- Added to NRHP: June 2, 1989

The Beaver Meadow Brook Archeological Site is a prehistoric Native American village or camp site in New Hampshire. Located near Sewall's Falls on the west bank of the Merrimack River, the site includes evidence of occupation during Middle and Late Archaic periods, as well as during the Woodland precontact period. Finds at the site include a stone axe and numerous tools for working stone, as well as projectile points and bone fragments. The site also has several hearths, evidence of significant occupation during the Woodland period.

The site was listed on the National Register of Historic Places in 1989.

== See also ==
- National Register of Historic Places listings in Merrimack County, New Hampshire
