= Hersey Farms Historic District =

Historic district in New Hampshire, United States

- U.S. National Register of Historic Places
- U.S. Historic district
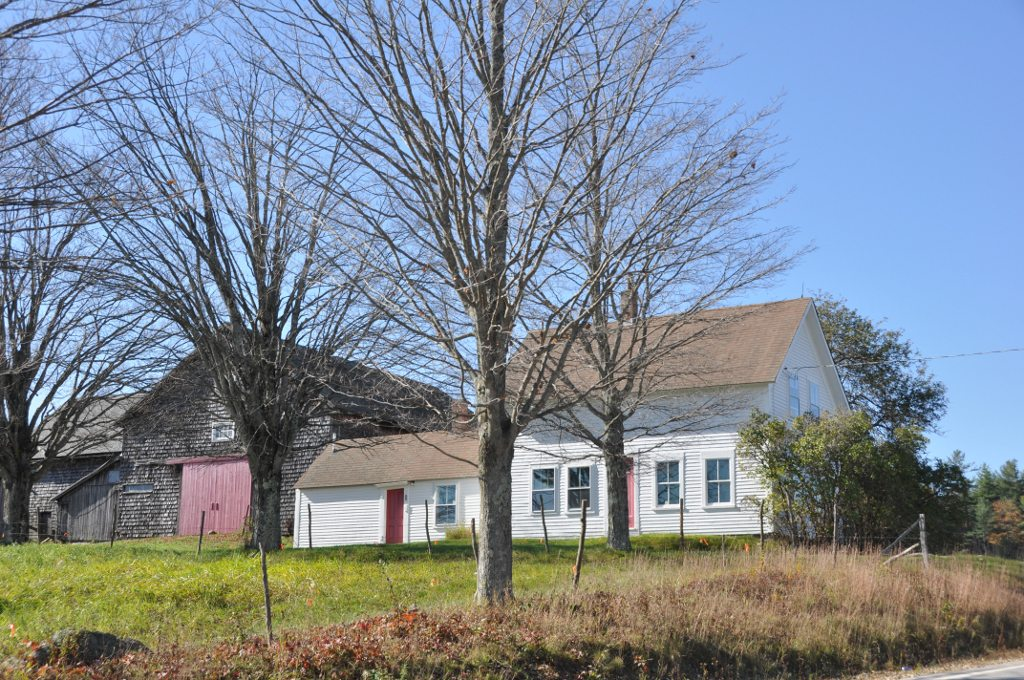
- The Guy Hersey farmstead

- Location within New Hampshire Location within the United States
- Location: 1057 & 1088 Franklin Hwy., Andover, New Hampshire
- Coordinates: 43°28′16″N 71°43′51″W
- Area: 325 acres (132 ha)
- Built: 1850
- Built by: Hiram Fellows; Alfred Weare; Guy Hersey
- NRHP reference No.: 08000512
- Added to NRHP: June 10, 2008

The Hersey Farms Historic District of Andover, New Hampshire, includes two farmsteads belonging to members of the Hersey family, located on the Franklin Highway (New Hampshire Route 11) in eastern Andover. The older of the two farms, the Guy Hersey Farm, was established c. 1850 by Hiram Fellows, and has been in the Hersey family since 1904. The adjacent James Hersey Farm was established in 1833 by Alfred Weare, and was acquired by Guy Hersey's son James in 1945. The two farms encompass 325 acres (132 ha), and were listed on the National Register of Historic Places in 2008.

== Guy Hersey Farm ==
The Guy Hersey Farm, 1088 Franklin Highway, includes 57 acres (23 ha) of land, a c. 1830 farmhouse, and a number of barns and other outbuildings. Although the house predates the establishment of the farm by Hiram Fellows, physical and documentary evidence suggest it was moved to this site from another location. It began as a 1 1/2-story wood-frame house with a side-gable roof. In the 1850s it was enlarged by raising the roof and adding a south wing. A barn dating to c. 1865-80 is connected to the house by a shed extension, and a second barn (c. 1917) is attached to the first. A third barn, dating to c. 1920 and moved to the site by Guy Hersey from another farm, forms an enclosed barnyard with the other two. The most interesting outbuilding is a c. 1890 structure that was initially used as a piggery, but was converted by Hersey into a smithy. Hersey's property also includes the foundational remnants of an old schoolhouse.

The farm that was established by Hiram Fellows was probably operated by his father Nathan on a subsistence basis. After several changes of ownership it was acquired by Hersey, who first had a dairy operation. When this became less economically viable, he used the farm to raise cattle, an operation that continues today.

== James Hersey Farm ==
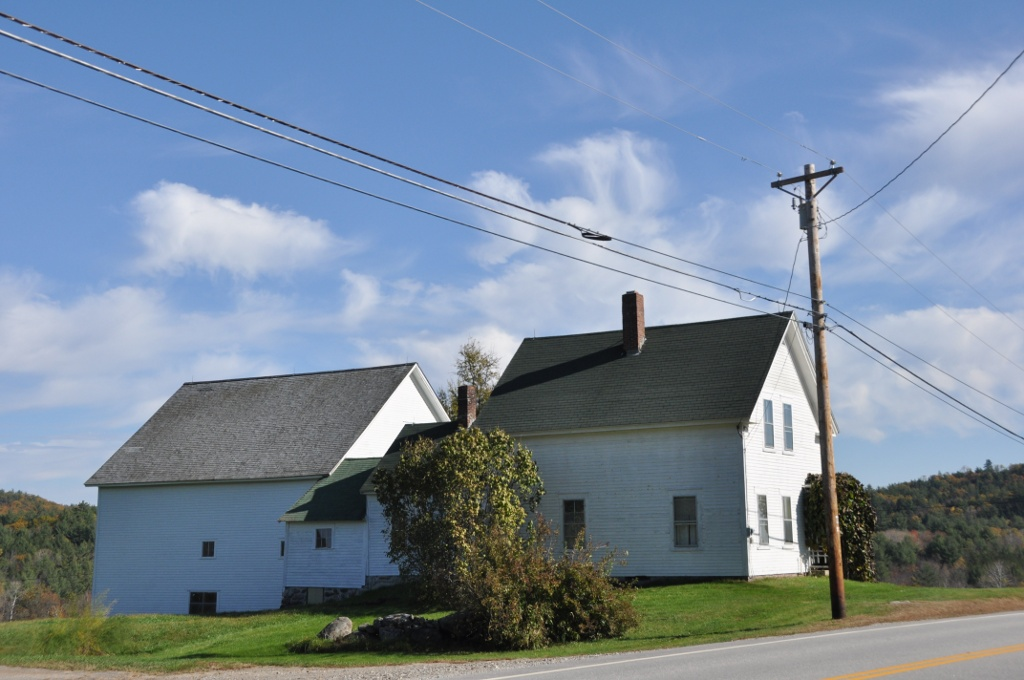
The James Hersey farmstead

The James Hersey Farm, 1057 Franklin Highway, consists of 270 acres (110 ha) of land on both sides of the highway, a c. 1874-75 farmhouse, and a number of outbuildings. The house was built by Alfred Weare after his earlier house was destroyed by fire resulting from a lightning strike. An attached barn from the same period, and a modern garage complete the main complex on the north side of the highway. Opposite this complex on the south side of the highway is a second barn and milk house, and there is a small logging camp structure in a wooded area of the property further to the south.

James Hersey acquired the property in 1945, and ran it as a dairy farm until 1980. The property was taken over by his son, who raises cattle on the property.

== See also ==
- National Register of Historic Places listings in Merrimack County, New Hampshire
