= Salisbury Academy Building =

United States historic place

- U.S. National Register of Historic Places
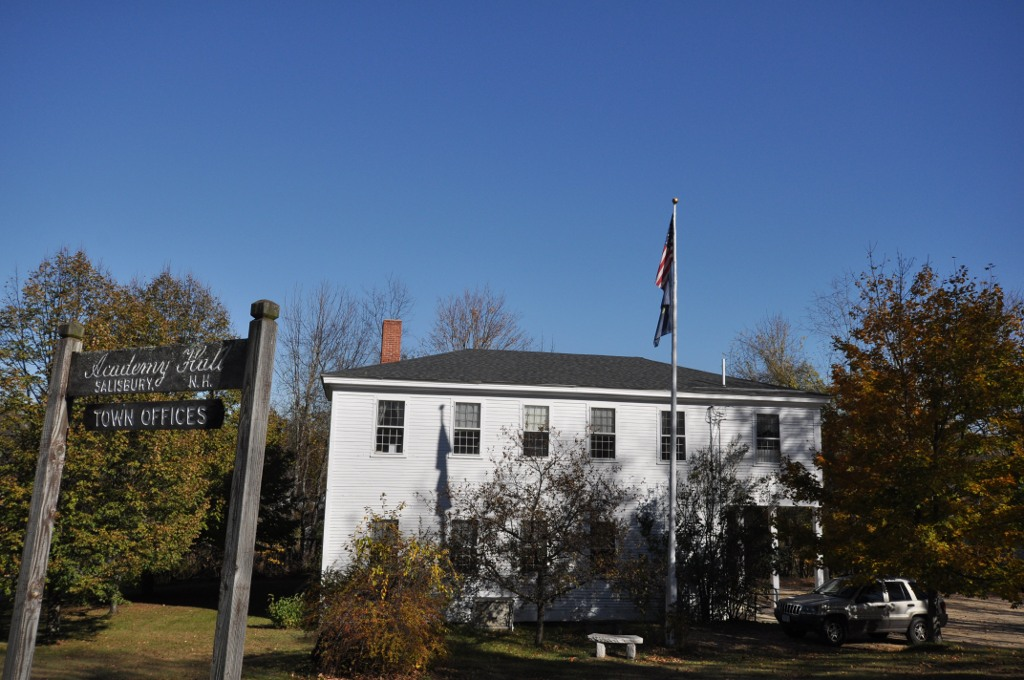

- Location within New Hampshire Location within the United States
- Location: 9 Old Coach Rd., Salisbury, New Hampshire
- Coordinates: 43°22′48″N 71°42′55″W
- Area: 0.5 acres (0.20 ha)
- Built: 1796
- NRHP reference No.: 75000235
- Added to NRHP: May 30, 1975

The Salisbury Academy Building is a historic school building at 9 Old Coach Road in Salisbury, New Hampshire. Built in 1796, the building has housed a district school, private secondary school, the local Grange chapter, and town offices and civic functions. The building was listed on the National Register of Historic Places in 1975. It presently houses town offices.

== Description and history ==
The Salisbury Academy Building is located in the village center of Salisbury, at the junction of Franklin Road (New Hampshire Route 127) and Old Coach Road (the old alignment of US Route 4, whose modern alignment runs a short way to the south). It is a 2 1/2-story wood-frame structure, with a hip roof and clapboarded exterior. Originally a rectangular structure, its upper floor was extended in 1883 as part of a conversion of the classrooms on that floor into a single meeting space, and now hangs over the east facade, supported by posts. Under this overhang are three doorways. The left two doorways each open into small vestibules, from which access is gained to what was originally a classroom space on the ground floor. The left vestibule also gives access to a small bathroom. The right door opens to a short hall, from which a stair rises to a large meeting space on the upper floor.

The two-story wood-frame building was built in 1796 to house a private academy of higher education in the area. The building was acquired by the town in 1806 and moved from Salisbury Heights to its present location. Its principal occupant until about 1865 was the academy, although a public district school also met on the ground floor. From 1884 to 1965 the building was used primarily by the local Grange. It now houses town offices.

== See also ==
- National Register of Historic Places listings in Merrimack County, New Hampshire
