= National Register of Historic Places listings in Merrimack County, New Hampshire =

Location of Merrimack County in New Hampshire

Merrimack County, New Hampshire, United States, has 89 properties and districts listed on the National Register of Historic Places, including two National Historic Landmarks.

Latitude and longitude coordinates are provided for many National Register properties and districts; these locations may be seen together in a map.

Contents: Counties in New Hampshire
Belknap - Carroll - Cheshire - Coös - Grafton - Hillsborough - Merrimack - Rockingham - Strafford - Sullivan

This National Park Service list is complete through NPS recent listings posted July 4, 2026.

== Current listings ==
	Name on the Register	Image	Date listed	Location	City or town	Description
1	2½ Beacon Street	2½ Beacon Street	December 17, 1984 (#84000500)	2½ Beacon St. 43°12′42″N 71°32′33″W	Concord	
2	Allenstown Meeting House	Allenstown Meeting House	December 6, 2004 (#04001327)	Deerfield Rd. 43°09′37″N 71°22′53″W	Allenstown	
3	Baptist New Meeting House	Baptist New Meeting House	December 22, 2005 (#05001446)	461 Main St. 43°24′45″N 71°58′50″W	New London	
4	Bear Brook State Park Civilian Conservation Corps (CCC) Camp Historic District	Bear Brook State Park Civilian Conservation Corps (CCC) Camp Historic District	June 11, 1992 (#92000632)	½ mile from park entrance, 160 yd (150 m) south of Allenstown-Deerfield Rd., in Bear Brook State Park; 43°09′29″N 71°22′44″W	Allenstown	
5	Beaver Meadow Brook Archeological Site (27MR3)	Beaver Meadow Brook Archeological Site (27MR3)	June 2, 1989 (#89000434)	West side of the Merrimack River near Sewall's Falls	Concord	Major Native American archeological site
6	Bement Covered Bridge	Bement Covered Bridge	November 21, 1976 (#76000128)	Center Rd. 43°15′51″N 71°57′13″W	Bradford	Over the Warner River
7	Bennett Farm	Bennett Farm	September 14, 2002 (#02000960)	11 Bennett Rd. 43°10′14″N 71°47′33″W	Henniker	
8	Blossom Hill and Calvary Cemeteries	Blossom Hill and Calvary Cemeteries	December 15, 2010 (#10000891)	N. State St. 43°13′19″N 71°33′13″W	Concord	
9	Bog Bridge	Bog Bridge	March 16, 1989 (#89000192)	Off NH 11 over Pleasant Brook; 43°25′49″N 71°52′11″W	Andover	
10	Boscawen Academy and Much-I-Do Hose House	Boscawen Academy and Much-I-Do Hose House	December 8, 1980 (#80000292)	King St. 43°19′03″N 71°37′20″W	Boscawen	
11	Boscawen Public Library	Boscawen Public Library	May 28, 1981 (#81000073)	King St. 43°19′09″N 71°37′31″W	Boscawen	
12	Bradford Center Meetinghouse	Bradford Center Meetinghouse	June 14, 2013 (#13000384)	18 Rowe Mountain Rd. 43°14′10″N 71°58′08″W	Bradford	
13	Bradford Town Hall	Bradford Town Hall	November 13, 1980 (#80000293)	W. Main St. 43°16′09″N 71°57′42″W	Bradford	
14	H. Styles Bridges House	H. Styles Bridges House	December 22, 2005 (#05001444)	21 Mountain Rd. 43°14′23″N 71°32′20″W	Concord	The official residence of the governor
15	Canterbury Shaker Village	Canterbury Shaker Village	June 17, 1975 (#75000129)	4 mi (6.4 km) east of Canterbury on Shaker Rd. 43°21′32″N 71°29′24″W	Canterbury	One of the best-preserved Shaker villages
16	Center Meetinghouse	Center Meetinghouse	December 19, 1979 (#79000201)	NH 103; 43°19′16″N 72°02′08″W	Newbury	
17	Chamberlin House	Chamberlin House	August 16, 1982 (#82001688)	44 Pleasant St. 43°12′12″N 71°32′19″W	Concord	
18	Concord Civic District	Concord Civic District	December 22, 1983 (#83004203)	107 N. Main St., 25 Capitol St., 39-45 Green St., 20-30 Park St., and 33 N. State St. 43°12′24″N 71°32′22″W	Concord	
19	Concord Gas Light Company Gasholder House	Concord Gas Light Company Gasholder House	January 12, 2018 (#100001962)	Gas St. 43°11′47″N 71°31′52″W	Concord	
20	Concord Historic District	Concord Historic District	June 11, 1975 (#75000234)	Roughly bounded by N. State St., Horse Shoe Pond, Boston and Maine railroad tracks, Sen. Styles Bridges Highway, and Church St. 43°12′57″N 71°32′30″W	Concord	
21	Contoocook Railroad Depot	Contoocook Railroad Depot	March 16, 2006 (#06000131)	896 Main St. in the village of Contoocook; 43°13′21″N 71°42′47″W	Hopkinton	
22	Henry J. Crippen House	Henry J. Crippen House	December 22, 1983 (#83004204)	189-191 N. Main St. 43°12′45″N 71°32′26″W	Concord	
23	Dalton Covered Bridge	Dalton Covered Bridge	November 21, 1976 (#76000221)	Joppa Rd. 43°16′36″N 71°48′43″W	Warner	Over the Warner River
24	Dimond Hill Farm	Dimond Hill Farm	March 15, 2007 (#07000155)	314 Hopkinton Rd. 43°11′28″N 71°37′03″W	Concord	
25	Lewis Downing Jr. House	Lewis Downing Jr. House	September 11, 1987 (#87001425)	33 Pleasant St. 43°12′10″N 71°32′18″W	Concord	
26	Downtown Concord Historic District	Downtown Concord Historic District	June 9, 2000 (#00000652)	Roughly bounded by Center St., Loudon Rd., Storrs St., Hills Ave., and S. State, Green, School, Capitol, and Park Sts. 43°12′19″N 71°32′15″W	Concord	
27	Gershom Durgin House	Gershom Durgin House	December 1, 2000 (#00001463)	391 Franklin Highway; 43°26′34″N 71°46′14″W	Andover	
28	Eagle Hotel	Eagle Hotel	September 20, 1978 (#78000216)	110 N. Main St. 43°12′25″N 71°32′12″W	Concord	
29	East Andover Village Center Historic District	East Andover Village Center Historic District	March 16, 1989 (#89000191)	Village of East Andover, junction of NH 11 and Chase Hill Rd. 43°27′34″N 71°44′51″W	Andover	
30	Endicott Hotel	Endicott Hotel	May 29, 1987 (#87000818)	1-3 S. Main St. 43°12′14″N 71°32′09″W	Concord	
31	Farrington House	Farrington House	March 9, 1982 (#82001858)	30 S. Main St. 43°12′11″N 71°32′09″W	Concord	
32	First Congregational Church of Boscawen	First Congregational Church of Boscawen	April 19, 1982 (#82001689)	King St. 43°19′19″N 71°37′45″W	Boscawen	
33	Reuben Foster House and Perley Cleaves House	Reuben Foster House and Perley Cleaves House	March 15, 1982 (#82001690)	64 and 62 N. State St. 43°12′35″N 71°32′27″W	Concord	
34	Franklin Falls Historic District	Franklin Falls Historic District	August 19, 1982 (#82001691)	Roughly bounded by Bow, River, and School Sts., Ayles Ct., and the Winnipesaukee River; 43°26′39″N 71°38′57″W	Franklin	Encompasses most of downtown Franklin
35	Hall Memorial Library	Hall Memorial Library	October 4, 1978 (#78000217)	Park St. 43°26′30″N 71°35′36″W	Northfield	
36	Charles S. Hall House	Charles S. Hall House	June 13, 2002 (#02000640)	1740 Dover Rd. 43°13′32″N 71°20′48″W	Epsom	
37	Matthew Harvey House	Matthew Harvey House	September 4, 1992 (#92001082)	Western side of Harvey Rd., 0.25 mi (0.40 km) north of its junction with Keyser St. 43°22′22″N 71°57′22″W	Sutton	
38	Hay Estate	Hay Estate	November 2, 2000 (#00001288)	NH 103A, 2.2 mi (3.5 km) north of its junction with NH 103; 43°21′00″N 72°02′43″W	Newbury	Former summer home of American statesman John Hay
39	Henniker Town Hall	Henniker Town Hall	February 24, 1981 (#81000074)	Depot Hill Rd. 43°10′32″N 71°49′23″W	Henniker	
40	Hersey Farms Historic District	Hersey Farms Historic District	June 30, 2008 (#08000512)	1057 and 1088 Franklin Highway; 43°28′16″N 71°43′51″W	Andover	
41	Hill Center Church	Hill Center Church	September 12, 1985 (#85002186)	Murray Hill Rd. 43°31′26″N 71°44′26″W	Hill	
42	Hopkinton Railroad Covered Bridge	Hopkinton Railroad Covered Bridge	January 11, 1980 (#80000294)	Off NH 103 and NH 127; 43°13′23″N 71°42′51″W	Hopkinton	Over Contoocook River in village of Contoocook
43	Howe-Quimby House	Howe-Quimby House	June 27, 1980 (#80000295)	Southwest of Hopkinton on Sugar Hill Rd. 43°09′29″N 71°42′03″W	Hopkinton	
44	Keniston Bridge	Keniston Bridge	March 16, 1989 (#89000190)	Bridge Rd. over the Blackwater River; 43°26′06″N 71°50′12″W	Andover	
45	Leavitt Farm	Leavitt Farm	March 11, 1982 (#82001692)	103 Old Loudon Rd. 43°13′56″N 71°28′52″W	Concord	
46	William H. Long Memorial	William H. Long Memorial	July 15, 1977 (#77000092)	Main St. 43°11′27″N 71°40′19″W	Hopkinton	Now houses the Hopkinton Historical Society
47	Loudon Town Hall	Loudon Town Hall	September 5, 1990 (#90001351)	Junction of Clough Hill and Youngs Hill Rds. 43°19′57″N 71°25′51″W	Loudon	
48	Lower Warner Meetinghouse	Lower Warner Meetinghouse	May 25, 1989 (#89000450)	NH 103; 43°16′28″N 71°47′57″W	Warner	
49	Memorial Arch of Tilton	Memorial Arch of Tilton	May 19, 1980 (#80000296)	Elm St. 43°26′23″N 71°35′17″W	Northfield	
50	Merrimack County Bank	Merrimack County Bank	February 28, 1980 (#80000415)	214 N. Main St. 43°12′41″N 71°32′20″W	Concord	
51	Merrimack County Courthouse	Merrimack County Courthouse	November 27, 1979 (#79000202)	163 N. Main St. 43°12′35″N 71°32′20″W	Concord	
52	Millville School	Millville School	November 7, 1985 (#85002781)	2 Fisk Rd. 43°11′50″N 71°34′28″W	Concord	
53	Morrill-Lassonde House	Morrill-Lassonde House	March 15, 1984 (#84003216)	East of King St. 43°18′38″N 71°36′52″W	Boscawen	
54	Murray Hill Summer Home District	Murray Hill Summer Home District	March 17, 1988 (#88000179)	Murray Hill Rd. roughly between Cass Mill and Lynch Rds. 43°32′24″N 71°47′46″W	Hill	
55	New Hampshire Savings Bank Building	New Hampshire Savings Bank Building	June 14, 1988 (#88000658)	97 N. Main St. 43°12′24″N 71°32′14″W	Concord	
56	North Wilmot Union Meetinghouse		March 16, 1989 (#89000186)	Jct. Breezy Hill and Piper Pond Rds. 43°29′59″N 71°56′33″W	Wilmot	Also called North Wilmot Church. website
57	Northfield Union Church	Northfield Union Church	March 15, 1984 (#84003219)	Sondogardy Pond Rd. 43°22′39″N 71°37′06″W	Northfield	
58	Jacob Noyes Block	Jacob Noyes Block	February 27, 1986 (#86000278)	48 Glass St. 43°07′50″N 71°27′06″W	Suncook	
59	Old North Cemetery	Old North Cemetery	November 9, 2008 (#08001031)	North State St. 43°12′53″N 71°32′40″W	Concord	
60	Old Post Office	Old Post Office	August 13, 1973 (#73000269)	N. State St., between Capitol and Park St. 43°12′23″N 71°32′24″W	Concord	
61	Old Webster Meeting House	Old Webster Meeting House	March 7, 1985 (#85000479)	1220 Battle Street (NH 127). 43°19′47″N 71°43′03″W	Webster	
62	Page Belting Company Mills	Page Belting Company Mills	June 14, 2002 (#02000641)	26 Commercial St. 43°13′01″N 71°32′21″W	Concord	
63	Pembroke Mill	Pembroke Mill	September 12, 1985 (#85002188)	100 Main St. 43°07′49″N 71°27′18″W	Pembroke	
64	Franklin Pierce House	Franklin Pierce House	October 15, 1979 (#79000318)	52 S. Main St. 43°12′01″N 71°32′03″W	Concord	Site of home of President Franklin Pierce, 1856–1869, and place where he died. Burned down in 1981. Not to be confused with Pierce Manse at 14 Horseshoe Pond Lane, Pierce's home during 1842–1848.
65	Pillsbury Memorial Hall	Pillsbury Memorial Hall	March 4, 1993 (#93000147)	93 Main St. 43°20′02″N 71°57′13″W	Sutton	
66	Pineground Bridge	Pineground Bridge	March 10, 2004 (#04000149)	0.15 mi (0.24 km) east of NH 28 on Depot Rd. 43°15′26″N 71°22′12″W	Chichester	Over Suncook River
67	Pittsfield Center Historic District	Pittsfield Center Historic District	December 12, 1980 (#80000416)	Main Street and town center side streets 43°18′18″N 71°19′34″W	Pittsfield	
68	Pleasant View Home	Pleasant View Home	September 19, 1984 (#84003222)	227 Pleasant St. 43°11′42″N 71°33′31″W	Concord	
69	Potter Place Railroad Station	Potter Place Railroad Station	March 16, 1989 (#89000189)	Depot St. 43°26′18″N 71°51′22″W	Andover	Houses the Andover Historical Society Museum
70	Robie's Country Store	Robie's Country Store	August 31, 2000 (#00001038)	8 Riverside St. 43°05′52″N 71°27′59″W	Hooksett	
71	Rolfe Barn	Rolfe Barn	March 15, 2007 (#07000154)	16 Penacook St. 43°17′00″N 71°35′23″W	Concord	Owned by the Penacook Historical Society
72	Gov. Frank West Rollins House	Gov. Frank West Rollins House	March 15, 1984 (#84003225)	135 N. State St. 43°12′54″N 71°32′36″W	Concord	
73	Rowell's Covered Bridge	Rowell's Covered Bridge	November 21, 1976 (#76000129)	Clement Hill Rd. 43°11′33″N 71°44′54″W	West Hopkinton	Over Contoocook River
74	Salisbury Academy Building	Salisbury Academy Building	May 30, 1975 (#75000235)	Junction of NH 127 and U.S. Route 4; 43°22′47″N 71°42′52″W	Salisbury	Now houses the town offices
75	South Danbury Christian Church	South Danbury Christian Church	June 6, 1985 (#85001191)	U.S. Route 4; 43°28′58″N 71°53′12″W	Danbury	
76	South Sutton Meeting House	South Sutton Meeting House	May 27, 1993 (#93000462)	17 Meeting House Hill Rd. 43°19′14″N 71°56′07″W	South Sutton	
77	Stanley Tavern	Stanley Tavern	September 7, 2005 (#05000970)	371 Main St. 43°11′29″N 71°40′27″W	Hopkinton	
78	Sulphite Railroad Bridge	Sulphite Railroad Bridge	June 11, 1975 (#75000130)	Off US 3 over the Winnipesaukee River; 43°26′43″N 71°38′10″W	Franklin	
79	Suncook Village Commercial-Civic Historic District	Suncook Village Commercial-Civic Historic District	March 15, 2005 (#05000174)	1 and 9-15 Glass St., 116-161 Main St., 19 Mill Falls, and 4 Union St. in the village of Suncook; 43°07′52″N 71°27′12″W	Pembroke	
80	Tucker Mountain Schoolhouse	Tucker Mountain Schoolhouse	March 18, 2005 (#05000175)	Tucker Mountain Road; 43°29′01″N 71°45′42″W	Andover	Former schoolhouse open as a local museum on weekends; operated by the Andover Historical Society
81	Donald D. Tuttle House	Donald D. Tuttle House	August 31, 1995 (#95001052)	12 Gabby Lane; 43°10′34″N 71°32′13″W	Concord	Listed at 257 Pleasant St; moved to Gabby Lane in Concord in 2009 to make way for the Langley Parkway
82	Upham-Walker House	Upham-Walker House	May 15, 1980 (#80000418)	18 Park St. 43°12′26″N 71°32′20″W	Concord	
83	Waterloo Covered Bridge	Waterloo Covered Bridge	November 21, 1976 (#76000130)	Newmarket Rd. 43°17′16″N 71°51′27″W	Waterloo	Over the Warner River
84	Waterloo Historic District	Waterloo Historic District	September 13, 2003 (#03000926)	78-183 Waterloo St., 12 and 68 Newmarket Rd., 4 Willoughby-Colby Rd., Bean Road Cemetery; 43°17′19″N 71°51′15″W	Warner	
85	Webster Congregational Church	Webster Congregational Church	March 7, 1985 (#85000480)	Off NH 127 on Long St. 43°19′48″N 71°43′00″W	Webster	
86	Daniel Webster Family Home	Daniel Webster Family Home	May 30, 1974 (#74000196)	S. Main St. 43°24′24″N 71°39′06″W	West Franklin	Farm owned by family of Daniel Webster; it is sometimes confused with the nearby Daniel Webster Birthplace state historic site.
87	Dr. Solomon M. Whipple House	Dr. Solomon M. Whipple House	September 12, 1985 (#85002187)	Main St. 43°24′48″N 71°59′05″W	New London	
88	White Farm	White Farm	May 15, 1981 (#81000075)	144 Clinton St. 43°11′19″N 71°33′37″W	Concord	
89	White Park	White Park	November 9, 1982 (#82000623)	Bounded by Washington, Centre, High, Beacon, and White Sts. 43°12′23″N 71°32′53″W	Concord	

== See also ==
- List of National Historic Landmarks in New Hampshire
- National Register of Historic Places listings in New Hampshire
