= Hall Memorial Library (Northfield, New Hampshire) =

- U.S. National Register of Historic Places
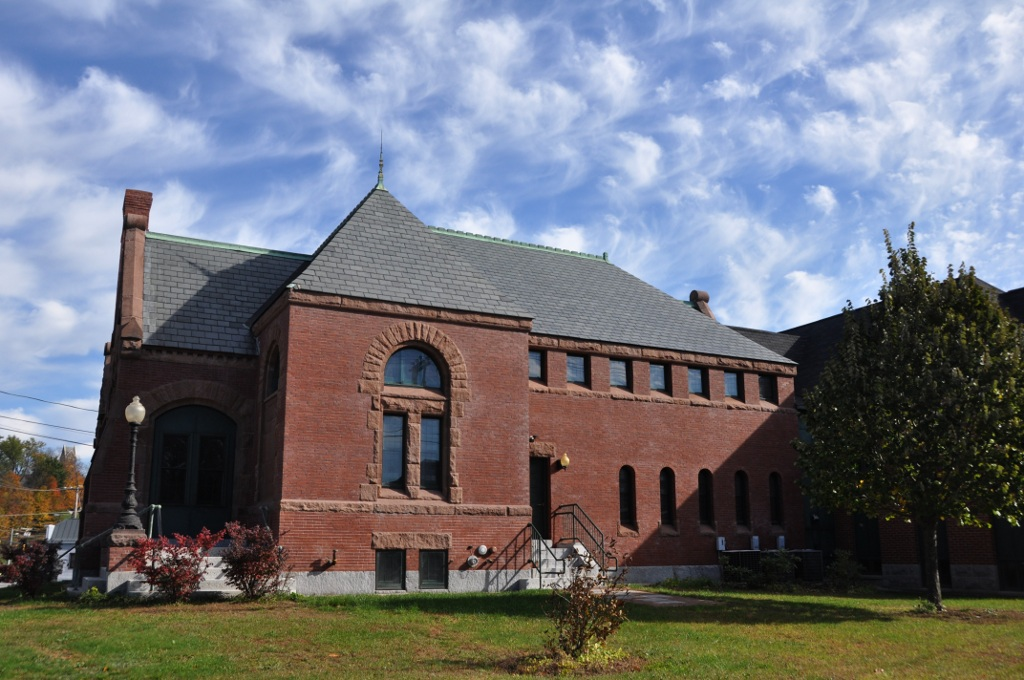

- Location within New Hampshire Location within the United States
- Location: 18 Park St., Northfield, New Hampshire
- Coordinates: 43°26′30″N 71°35′36″W
- Area: 0.3 acres (0.12 ha)
- Built: 1887
- Architect: Wait & Cutter
- Architectural style: Romanesque
- NRHP reference No.: 78000217
- Added to NRHP: October 4, 1978

The Hall Memorial Library is the public library of Tilton and Northfield, New Hampshire. It is located at 18 Park Street in Northfield, in an 1887 Richardsonian Romanesque building. The building, one of the most architecturally distinguished in the region, was listed on the National Register of Historic Places in 1978.

== Architecture and history ==
The Hall Memorial Library is located a short way south of downtown Tilton, on the Northfield side of the Winnipesaukee River, on a triangular parcel bounded by Park and Elm streets. It is a 1-1/2 story masonry structure, built out of red brick with brownstone trim. Characteristics of the Richardsonian Romanesque include round-arch windows lined with rough-cut brownstone, corner buttresses, and patterned brickwork in the gable peaks. This building is an almost exact replica of Banister Memorial Hall (aka Merrick Library) in Brookfield, Massachusetts, and was designed by Wait & Cutter of Boston, who also designed the Brookfield library.

A library association was founded in the 1880s to serve the communities of Tilton and Northfield. It was given a bequest by Mary Hall Cummings in 1887 for the construction of this building. In the 1970s, that association was superseded by the Tilton-Northfield Library Association, which now manages the library.

== Services ==
In addition to a circulating collection of books, media, and periodicals, the library offers internet access and access to a variety of online databases, as well as downloadable audio books. Also available for borrowing are passes for admission to regional museums.

== See also ==
- National Register of Historic Places listings in Merrimack County, New Hampshire
