= Concord Historic District =

Historic district in New Hampshire, United States

- U.S. National Register of Historic Places
- U.S. Historic district
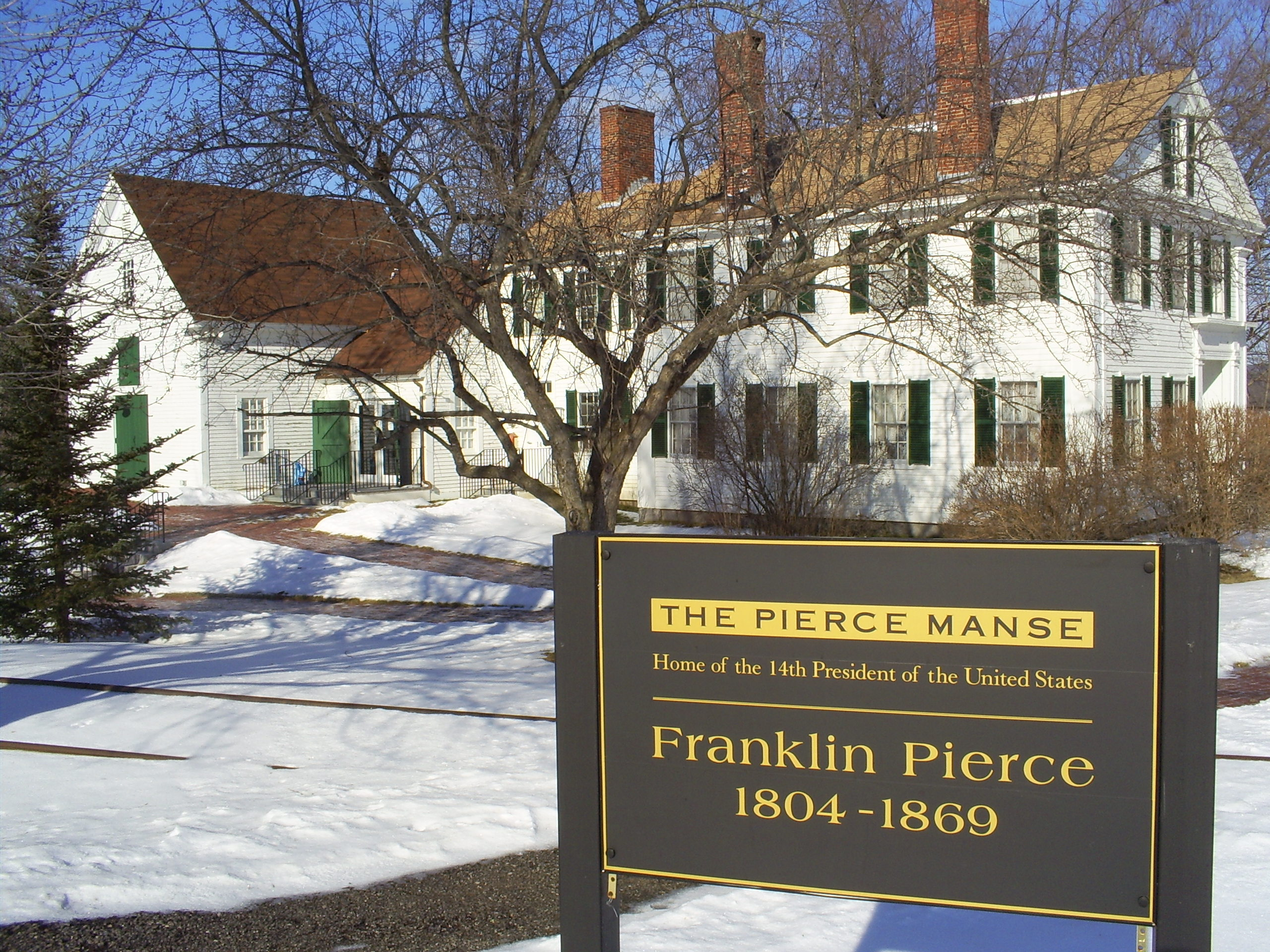
- The Pierce Manse

- Location within New Hampshire Location within the United States
- Location: Roughly bounded by N. State St., Horse Shoe Pond, Boston and Maine RR. tracks, Sen. Styles Bridges Hwy. and Church St., Concord, New Hampshire
- Coordinates: 43.21591°N 71.54118°W
- Area: 25 acres (10 ha)
- Architectural style: Greek Revival, Georgian, Federal
- NRHP reference No.: 75000234
- Added to NRHP: June 11, 1975

The Concord Historic District encompasses the least altered portion of the historic heart of Concord, New Hampshire. The 25-acre (10 ha) district, located just north of the modern commercial and civic heart of the city, includes the city's oldest surviving house, the site of its first religious meetinghouse, and the Pierce Manse, a historic house museum that was home to President Franklin Pierce during his rise to national prominence. The district was listed on the National Register of Historic Places in 1975.

The original heart of Concord was platted out in 1726, on a terrace above the floodplains on the western banks of the Merrimack River. The lots, about 1.5 acres (0.61 ha) in size, were arrayed in the vicinity of Horseshoe Pond, and it is the earliest of these that make up the district. The area is characterized by a uniformity of setting, despite a diversity in architectural style, in part because most of the buildings are similarly-sized dwellings set on equal-sized lots. Larger buildings, including a church, school, and professional offices, stand on larger lots.

The oldest surviving house, that of Reverend Timothy Walker, was built in 1735. It was also the first house in the area to be garrisoned (fortified and surrounded by a palisade) against Native attacks. The district was also home to Concord's first meeting house (no longer extant). The residential structures in the district represent the variety of architectural styles popular during the 19th century, including the fine Greek Revival Pierce Manse, a Victorian Gothic cottage at 278 North Main Street, and the late Gothic brick house at 266 North Main Street. There are only a few buildings in the district built after the 1920s, among them the Lutheran church.

== See also ==
- National Register of Historic Places listings in Merrimack County, New Hampshire
