= Merrimack County Bank =

- U.S. National Register of Historic Places
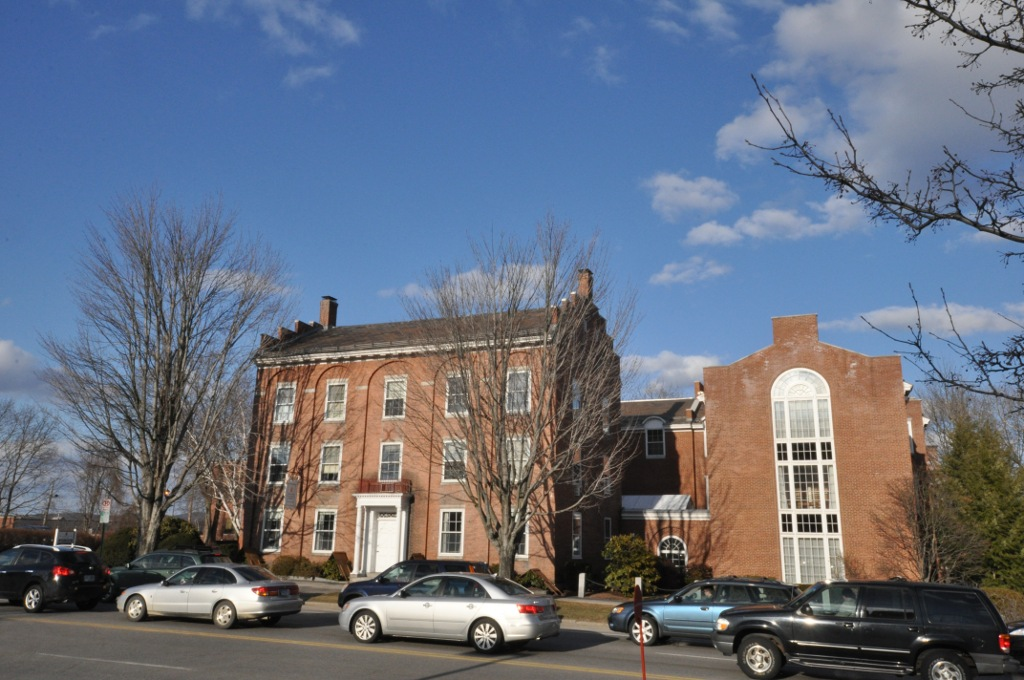

- Location within New Hampshire Location within the United States
- Location: 214 N. Main St., Concord, New Hampshire
- Coordinates: 43°12′41″N 71°32′20″W
- Area: 0.8 acres (0.32 ha)
- Built: 1826
- Architect: Leach, John; Lowell, Guy
- Architectural style: Colonial Revival, Federal
- NRHP reference No.: 80000415
- Added to NRHP: February 28, 1980

The Merrimack County Bank building is a historic commercial building at 214 North Main Street in Concord, New Hampshire. The three-story brick Federal style building was built in 1826 to house the offices of the Merrimack County Bank on the first floor, law offices on the second floor, and a public meeting space above. In 1840, the upper floor was taken over by the New Hampshire Historical Society for use as a library. The Society significantly altered the interior in the early 20th century to convert this space for display purposes. In 1952 the building was acquired by the Christian Mutual Life Insurance Company, which restored the interior to its original Federal appearance, and sold the building to a law firm in the 1970s. The building also housed the law offices of future president Franklin Pierce.

The building stands on the east side of North Main Street, north of the main commercial section of downtown Concord. Its most distinctive external feature is its stepped gable ends. The five bays on the front facade are demarcated by blind arches that are slightly recessed from the main facade. Its center entry is sheltered by a pillared wooden portico added in 1921 by architect Guy Lowell as part of the Society's alterations.

The building was listed on the National Register of Historic Places in 1980. It is architecturally significant as a fine example of Federal period architecture, and historically significant for its association with Franklin Pierce, and with local historian Dr. Nathaniel Bouton, who wrote an important early history of Concord in a study in this building.

== See also ==
- National Register of Historic Places listings in Merrimack County, New Hampshire
