= Siege of Fort at Number 4 =

1747 siege

Coordinates: 43°15′18″N 72°25′56″W

Siege of Fort at Number Four
- Part of King George's War
Date	7–9 April 1747
Location	present-day Charlestown, New Hampshire
Result	British victory

Belligerents
France	Great Britain

Commanders and leaders
Joseph Boucher de Niverville	Phineas Stevens

Strength
10 French troops, 60 Abenaki warriors	32 provincial militia

The siege of Fort at Number Four (7–9 April 1747) was a frontier action at present-day Charlestown, New Hampshire, during King George's War. The Fort at Number 4 (named so because it was located in the fourth of a series of recently surveyed township land parcels), (Note: Number 1 was in Chesterfield, Number 2 was in Westmoreland, and Number 3 was in Walpole.) was unsuccessfully besieged by a French and Native force under the command of Ensign Joseph Boucher de Niverville. The British defenders were alerted to the presence of the besiegers by their dogs, and were well-prepared to defend the fort. They successfully fought off attempts to burn the fort down, and turned down demands that they surrender. Some of Boucher de Niverville's Natives, short on provisions, attempted to bargain with the fort's defenders for supplies, but were rejected.

== Background ==
In the 1720s, during Dummer's War, the Province of Massachusetts Bay constructed Fort Dummer at present-day Brattleboro, Vermont. In the following years, settlers from Massachusetts, who had laid claim to the territory, moved up the Connecticut River, establishing small frontier settlements. The most northerly of these, 34 miles (55 km) north of Fort Dummer and located at the site of present-day Charlestown, New Hampshire, was called Number Four. In 1741, King George II declared that the territory belonged to the Province of New Hampshire. Massachusetts withdrew its protection from both Fort Dummer and Number Four, and New Hampshire, none of whose existing settlements were near these places, also refused to provide protection. In 1744, settlers constructed the Fort at Number 4, to provide for their own protection.

Massachusetts reluctantly agreed to provide some militia forces to the area when King George's War broke out. During the summer of 1746, Number Four was repeatedly attacked by French and Native raiding parties organized by the authorities of New France, and these militia had provided timely defense. The severity of the attacks, however, prompted the settlers to abandon Number Four, which remained unoccupied during the winter of 1746–47. The fort was then occupied by Captain Phineas Stevens and 30 provincial militia in the spring of 1747. Stevens brought with him several dogs, which provided early warning of the arrival of strangers.

The Marquis de Beauharnois, New France's governor, had waged a war against the frontiers of the northern British colonies (New York, Massachusetts, New Hampshire, and Nova Scotia) since the fall of Louisbourg in 1745 had dried up supplies of important trade goods and provisions. In early 1747, one of the parties he sent south consisted of 10 French troupes de la marine (the colonial troops) and 60 Abenaki warriors under the command of Ensign Joseph Boucher de Niverville. Some English accounts of the action report Boucher de Niverville's claims that he had several hundred men; they also incorrectly identify the party leader as "General Debeline".

== Siege ==
On April 7, eleven days after Captain Stevens and his men arrived, Boucher de Niverville's force arrived at Number Four. Although they remained concealed in the woods that surrounded the fort, one of Stevens' men was alerted to the enemy presence by his dogs, which refused to stop barking. Cautiously leaving the fort with some of the dogs to investigate, he was eventually fired on and slightly wounded, after which he retreated into the fort. Boucher de Niverville's party fired ineffectual volleys of musket fire at the fort, and then set on fire buildings on the windward side of the fort in an attempt to burn it down. The defenders, who had plentiful access to water, seized upon an ingenious method to keep the flames at bay. Some of the men were sent outside the walls, where they then dug trenches near the walls. Inside the trenches, men were protected from hostile musket fire, and were also able to use water passed in buckets from inside the fort to keep the fort's timbers wet.

When the attempt to burn the fort failed, Boucher de Niverville requested a cessation of hostilities for the night, to be followed by a parley the next morning. Stevens agreed, and refused Boucher de Niverville's demand in the parley that he surrender. Upon returning to the fort, he held a council with his men, who all agreed with the decision. Boucher de Niverville's force ineffectually continued to fire on the fort that day and into the evening. Attempts to ignite the fort with fire arrows were easily quenched by the defenders.

On the morning of April 9, two Natives came forward and requested a parley. They offered to cease hostilities in exchange for provisions. Stevens refused, offering instead to accept hostages, to be exchanged for British prisoners later, in exchange for food. The Natives refused, and after a desultory exchange of musket fire, the French and Native force withdrew.

== Aftermath ==
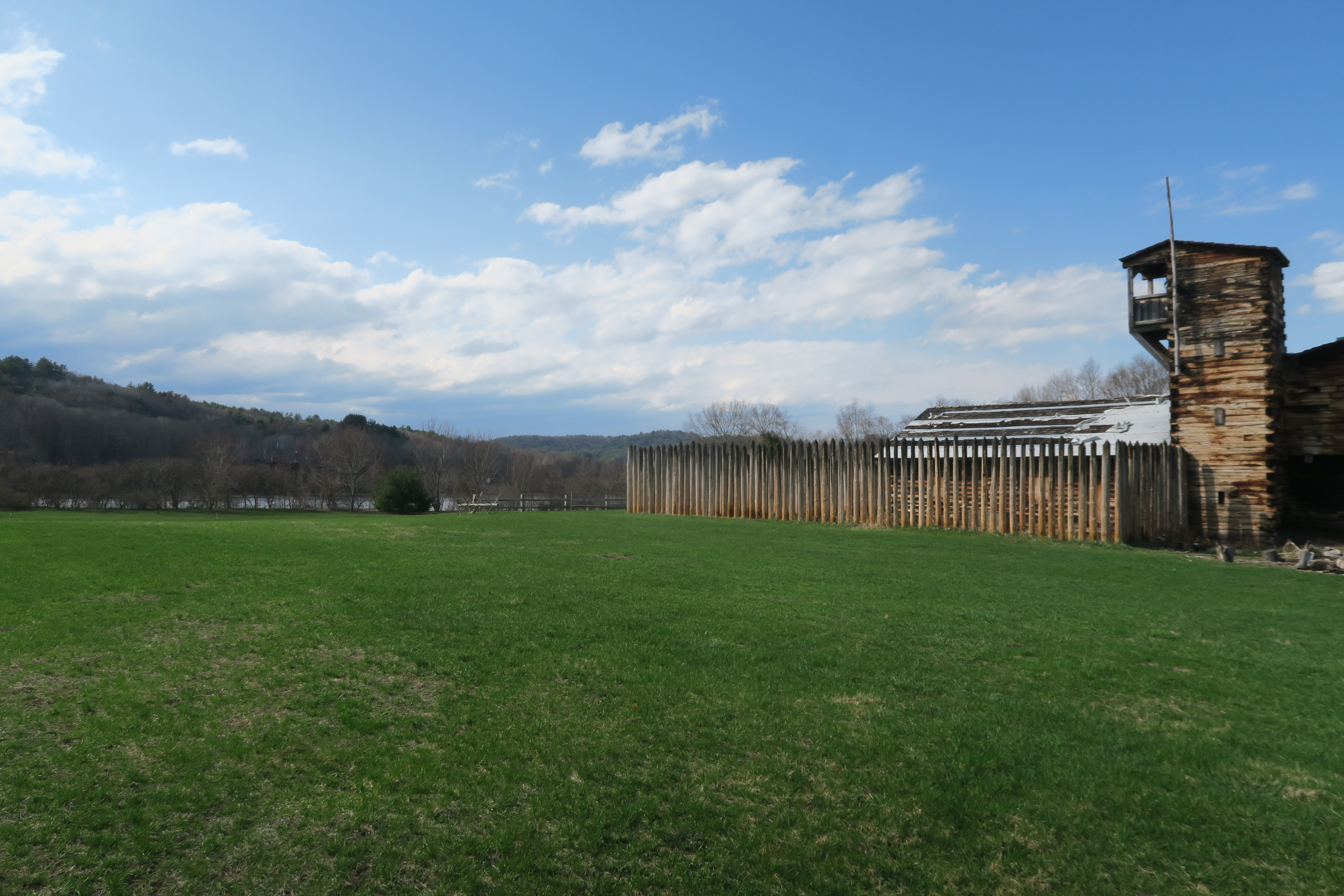
The present-day reconstruction of Fort at Number 4

Boucher de Niverville's hungry force then moved further south, destroying, according to one report, "three meeting-houses, several fine barns, about one hundred dwellings, mostly of two stories, furnished even to chests of drawers, and killed five to six hundred sheep and hogs, and about thirty horned cattle."

Sir Charles Knowles of the Royal Navy, who later became Rear-Admiral of Great Britain, was in Boston when news of the spirited defense of Number Four arrived. He recognized Stevens' leadership by sending him a silver-hilted sword. As a result, the settlers of Number Four decided to name the community Charlestown in Knowles' honor. The reconstructed fort, dating to 1960, is now an open-air museum, recreating the era of King George's War.

== See also ==
- New Hampshire Historical Marker No. 2: Fort at No. 4

== Sources ==
- Calloway, Colin. The Western Abenakis
- Parkman, Francis. A Half-Century of Conflict, Volume 2
