= Deerfield Center Historic District =

Historic district in New Hampshire, United States

- U.S. National Register of Historic Places
- U.S. Historic district
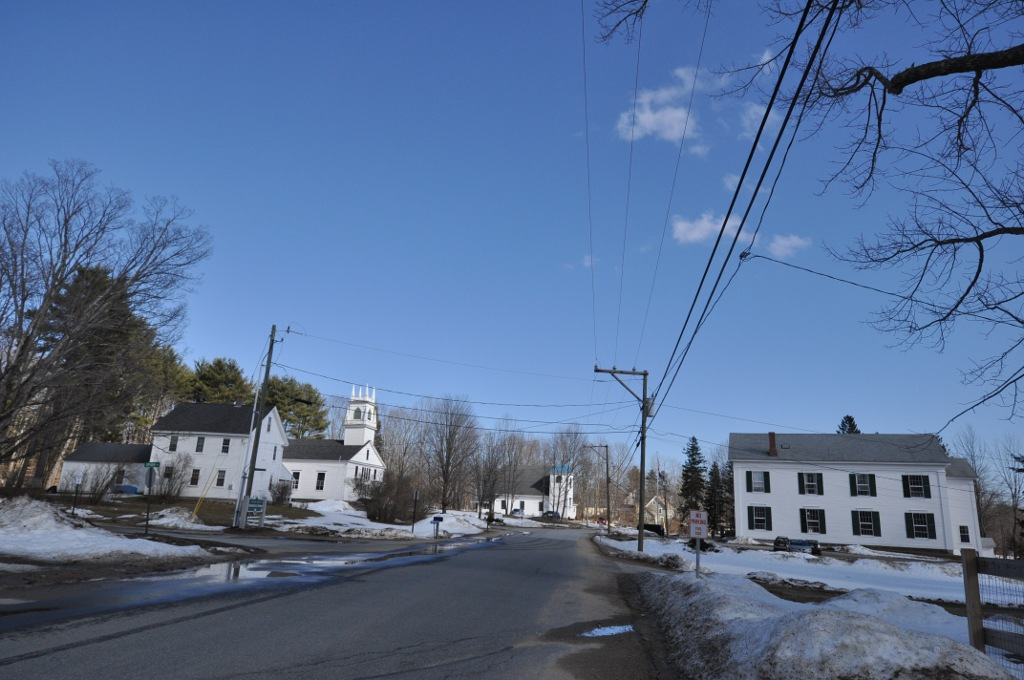

- Location within New Hampshire Location within the United States
- Location: 1 Candia Rd., 1-14 Church Street, Deerfield, New Hampshire
- Coordinates: 43°8′0″N 71°14′37″W
- Area: 12.1 acres (4.9 ha)
- Built: 1834
- Architect: Foster & Robinson; Chase R. Whitcher
- Architectural style: Greek Revival, Classical Revival, et al.
- NRHP reference No.: 02000958
- Added to NRHP: September 14, 2002

The Deerfield Center Historic District encompasses the heart of the rural New Hampshire town of Deerfield. It extends northwest along Church Street (formerly Old Center Road South) from its junction with North Road, Candia Road, and Raymond Road. It includes many of the town's municipal buildings, as well as a church and private residences, most of which were built before about 1920. The district was listed on the National Register of Historic Places in 2002.

== Description and history ==
The town of Deerfield was incorporated in 1766, having originally been part of a land grant that formed Nottingham in 1721. Its early town center, little more than the colonial meeting house, was located north of the present center nearer the town's geographic center, and was set high on a hill, with little level space for growth. The present town center grew around the crossroads of Church, Candia, Raymond, and North roads. A Baptist congregation built a church here in 1805, and by the 1820s there was a small cluster of buildings including houses and taverns. By 1835 all of the local religious groups had churches here, and in 1845 the town voted to build a new town hall, demolishing the original meeting house and using some of its timbers for the new one. Other municipal buildings followed, including the library (1913–14) and fire department (1933).

The historic district extends from the main junction northwest along Church Street. It includes fourteen primary buildings, of which twelve are historic. There are three churches, the town hall, fire station, and Soldiers Memorial (which houses the library), while the remaining buildings are residential. Construction appears to have happened in three major waves: the 1830s, 1850-60s, and 1880s. All but two buildings are of wood-frame construction, and covered in either clapboards or modern siding of similar appearance, while the fire station and memorial are brick. The buildings are stylistically diverse, with 19th-century styles predominating but none individually dominating.

The designers of two buildings in the district are known: Foster & Robinson of Concord were architects of the Deerfield Town House, built in 1856, and Manchester architect Chase R. Whitcher designed the Soldiers Memorial Building, containing the public library, which was built in 1913–14.

== See also ==
- National Register of Historic Places listings in Rockingham County, New Hampshire
