= Dow Academy =

- U.S. National Register of Historic Places
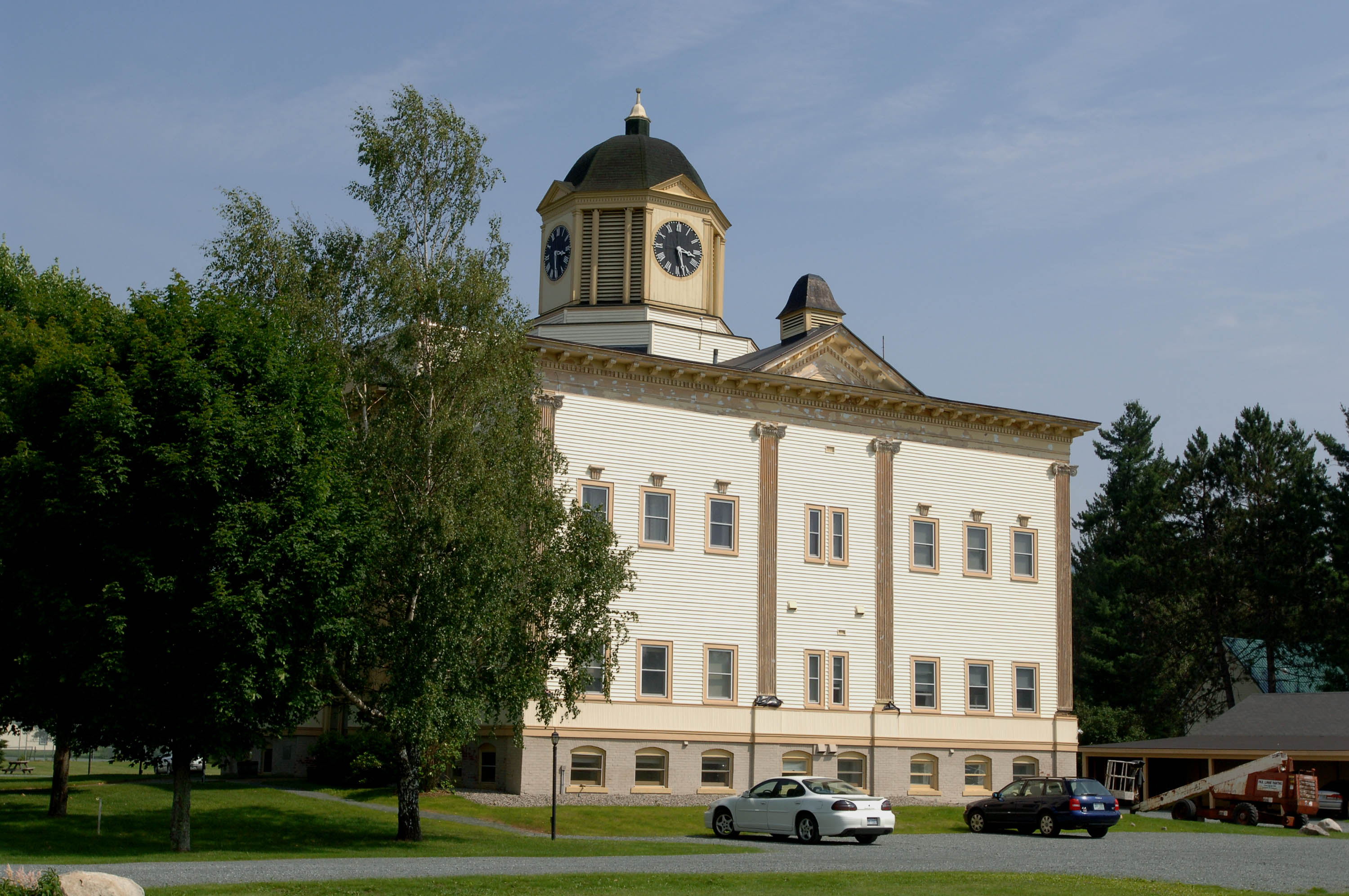

- Location within New Hampshire Location within the United States
- Location: Academy St., Franconia, New Hampshire
- Coordinates: 44°13′32″N 71°44′53″W
- Area: 4.58 acres (1.85 ha)
- Built: 1903
- Architect: Chase R. Whitcher
- Architectural style: Colonial Revival
- NRHP reference No.: 82001675
- Added to NRHP: August 31, 1982

Dow Academy was a school in Franconia, New Hampshire, United States. Founded in 1884, it served as the town's high school until 1958, after which its building, a Georgian Revival wood-frame building built in 1903, became a centerpiece of the Franconia College campus. The building, along with a nearby carriage house, were converted into sixteen condominium residences in 1983; it was listed on the National Register of Historic Places in 1982.

== School history ==
Dow Academy was founded in 1884 by Moses Arnold Dow, a magazine publisher, as a secondary school for both local and out-of-town boarding students. He seeded the school with $15,000 for construction of its first building, which stood at the corner of Church and Academy streets and was completed in 1885. That building was destroyed by fire in December 1902.

The surviving academy building was constructed the following year, funded by a public-private partnership in which the town's students were able to attend the school in exchange for its financial support. The building was designed by noted New Hampshire architect Chase R. Whitcher.

The town gradually took over administration of the school entirely, which continued in operation as its principal primary and secondary school until 1958. The surviving campus buildings were then taken over by Franconia College, and anchored the college's Lower Campus. Dow served as the primary facility for the Theater, Dance, and Ceramics departments, and housed the Sculpture Department until the fall of 1975. Franconia College filed for bankruptcy in 1978, and the building was subsequently converted into condominiums. The town still maintains an interest in the building's landmark clock tower, partially funding its restoration in 2014.

== Building architecture ==
The Dow Academy building stands on the south side of Academy Street just east of its junction with Easton Road and across from Dow Field, which is a public park. The building sits on a 4.58-acre lot owned by the Dow Academy condominium association. The building is two stories in height and roughly square in shape, with a hip roof and a high brick foundation. The roof has a deep cornice studded with modillion blocks. Facades are seven bays wide, with two-story pilasters at the corners and flanking the central bay, which is surmounted by a low-pitch pedimented gable. The main facade has an elaborate center bay, with paired columns flanking a rounded entrance, and above that a Palladian window. The front entry of the building was restored in 2023.

Rising from the center of the roof is a wide octagonal tower, with clock faces on four sides and louvered openings on the other four. The clock sides are topped by gables, and the tower is capped by a dome. The clock was donated by Charles Greenleaf, the benefactor of Franconia's Abbie Greenleaf Library, and was manufactured by E. Howard & Co. of Boston, Massachusetts.

== Notable alumni ==
- Fred H. Brown (class of 1897), baseball player and politician
- Jessica Garretson Finch (class of 1893), author, suffragette, founding president of Finch College

== See also ==
- National Register of Historic Places listings in Grafton County, New Hampshire
