= Sylvester T. Goss =

New Hampshire printer in 19th century

- Occupations: Printer, newspaper editor, publisher
- Known for: Publishing the New Hampshire Intelligencer and other works
- Notable work: New Hampshire Intelligencer, The Evangelist, Kaleidoscope

Sylvester T. Goss was a printer and newspaper editor and publisher in New Hampshire. He published the New Hampshire Intelligencer. After working in publishing in Boston he moved to Haverhill, New Hampshire, where he founded, edited, and published a newspaper for several years and printed other publications. He published the Evangelist newspaper.

In 1818, he and Abraham Hews Jr., published the Kaleidoscope. In the wake of nationalism that swept across the U.S. after the War of 1812, they reprinted the Novanglus and Massachusettensis letters in a single book. They "obtained from Adams, who at the time was busily exhorting his younger countrymen to apply themselves to the task of writing accurate histories of the American Revolution, consent to publish his side of the correspondence. The end result was Novanglus and Massachusettensis; or Political Essays, Published in the Years 1774 and 1775, on the Principal Points of Controversy, between Great Britain and Her Colonies . . . , Boston, 1819. In addition to the letters, which Hews and Goss reprinted directly from the original newspapers with minor changes in punctuation, this volume also contains a preface and an appendix by Adams. "

In Haverhill, New Hampshire he published the New-Hampshire Intelligencer It was published ca. December 1821 to June 1827. His office was home to a lending library.

He published Mary Marshall Dyer's books on Shakerism in 1822.

Horace Webster Morse worked at his office. Moses Arnold Dow was also a worker for him.

== Publishings ==
- Young Bostonian: The Times, printed and published by Sylvester T. Goss (1820)
- Religious letter
- Catalogue of the members of the society of Social friends, Dartmouth college, 1822
- The English reader; or, Pieces in prose and poetry, selected from the best writers...With a few preliminary observations on the principles of good reading by Lindley Murray
- A sermon delivered at Acworth before the General Association of the state of New-Hampshire, September 2, 1823 by David Sutherland (preacher) (1777-1855); General Association of New Hampshire
- A pocket geographical and statistical gazetteer of the state of Vermont [electronic resource] : embellished with diagrams : to which is prefixed a particular description of the city of Washington and a large number of statistical tables of the United States : compiled from the most recent authorities and personal observation by Noah J. T. George (Noah Jackson T. George) (died 1849) (1823)
- Collectanea: or, Select poems. Moral, humorous, melodious, plaintive, satirical, sentimental and miscellaneous compiled by Samuel C. Stevens

== See also ==
- List of newspapers in New Hampshire
