= Joshua L. Foster =

American journalist

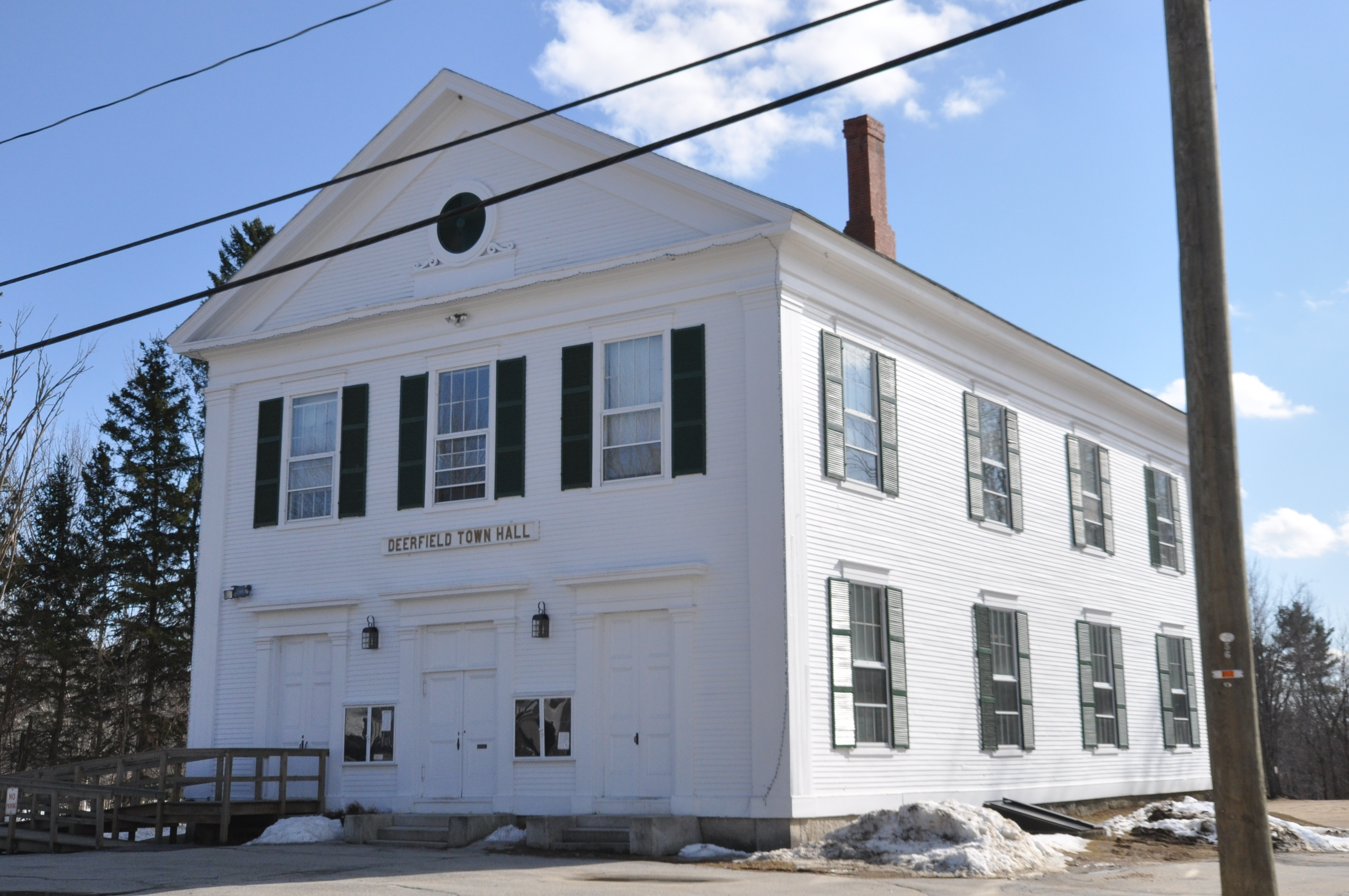
The Town House in Deerfield, New Hampshire, designed by Foster & Robinson in 1856.

Joshua Lane Foster (born October 10, 1824, in Canterbury, New Hampshire - d. January 29, 1900, in Dover, New Hampshire) was an architect and publisher who was the founder of the newspaper Foster's Daily Democrat in 1872. The former owner of States and Union, a pro-states-rights newspaper, he continued to write and edit in this vein. Originally he founded this new newspaper as a pro-slavery alternate view to the anti-slavery local papers. Foster's racism and hatred of President Lincoln are part of the historical record of nineteenth-century New Hampshire. After Foster's death, the Democrat remained in the ownership of the Foster family until 2014. Until that sale, it was one of the few independent newspapers left. In the first issue of Foster's, Joshua said:

"We shall devote these columns mainly to the material and vital interests of Dover and vicinity. Whatever may tend to benefit this people and enhance their prosperity, will receive our warm and enthusiastic support."

Foster was trained as a carpenter, and practiced as an architect in Concord for about ten years, though this was ended by the financial turmoil surrounding the Panic of 1857. In at least 1856 he was in partnership with Fernando S. Robinson.

Extant buildings designed by Foster include the Merrimack County Courthouse (1855–57, now altered) and the Deerfield Town House (1856). Both of these buildings have been listed on the United States National Register of Historic Places, and the Deerfield Town House has also been included in the Deerfield Center Historic District.

After the panic, he purchased the Gazette of Dover in 1858, which he ran until 1861, when he briefly returned to architecture, practicing in Manchester. From 1863 he published other papers in Portsmouth, New Hampshire, New Haven, Connecticut and Manchester, New Hampshire, returning to Dover in 1872 to found the Daily Democrat.
