= List of New Hampshire historical markers (1–25) =

- 26–50»

This page is one of a series of pages that list New Hampshire historical markers. The text of each marker is provided within its entry.

Contents
No.	Title	Location	Coordinates
1	Republic of Indian Stream	Pittsburg	45.05151855°N 71.38705811°W
2	Fort at No. 4	Charlestown	43.23312°N 72.42397°W
3	Birthplace of Horace Greeley	Amherst	42.89659°N 71.60437°W
4	William & Mary Raids	New Castle	43.07079°N 70.71416°W
5	George A. Wentworth 1835–1906	Wakefield	43.63342°N 71.05002°W
6	Sarah Josepha Buell Hale 1788–1879	Newport	43.37782°N 72.14018°W
7	Dudley Leavitt 1772–1851	Center Harbor	43.68724°N 71.45819°W
8	Site of Piscataqua Bridge	Durham	43.1298°N 70.86108°W
9	Stone Iron Furnace	Franconia	44.23005°N 71.7544°W
10	First Textile Mills	New Ipswich	42.7508°N 71.82926°W
11	First Ascent of Mount Washington	Pinkham's Grant	44.26138°N 71.2471°W
12	Temple Glass Factory	Sharon	42.81908°N 71.8508°W
13	Hannah Davis – Amos Fortune	Jaffrey	42.82717°N 72.05446°W
14	Early American Clocks	Chester	42.95763°N 71.25534°W
15	Shaker Village	Loudon	43.32552°N 71.47783°W
16	Winston Churchill 1871–1947	Cornish	43.517°N 72.38587°W
17	Old Province Road	Gilmanton	43.39175°N 71.36289°W
18	Isles of Shoals	Rye	43.00155954°N 70.74433046°W
19	Thaddeus S. C. Lowe 1832–1913	Jefferson	44.44541°N 71.52887°W
20	Captain Lovewell's War	Ossipee	43.77561°N 71.16308°W
21	Canaan Street	Canaan	43.64667°N 72.01179°W
22	Denman Thompson 1833–1911	Swanzey	42.87333°N 72.28154°W
23	Soapstone	Francestown	42.98511°N 71.80431°W
24	LaFayette's Tour	Northwood	43.2156°N 71.2027°W
25	Major John Simpson	Deerfield	43.14403°N 71.2344°W
Notes • References • External links

== Markers 1 to 25 ==
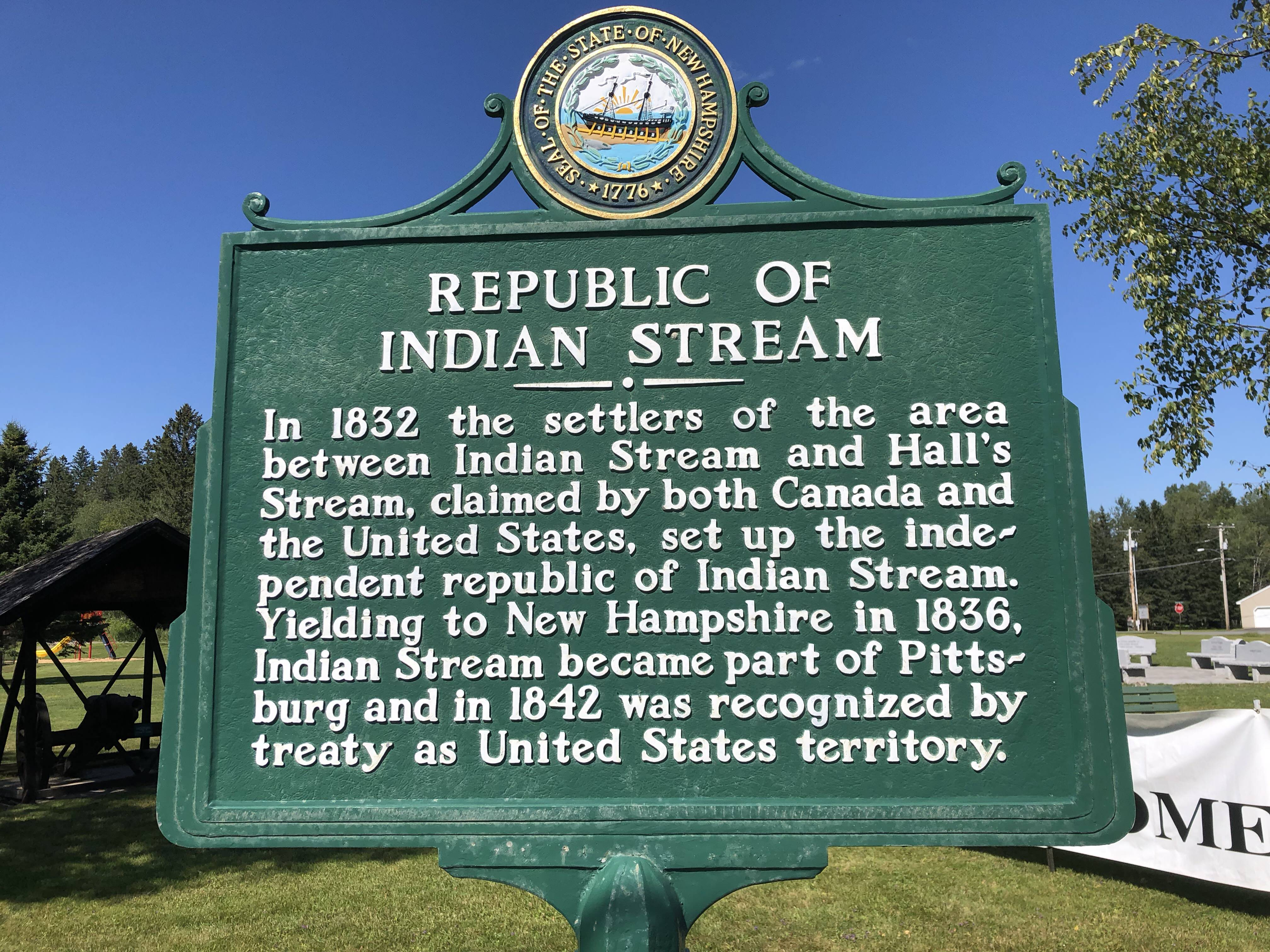
New Hampshire historical marker number one, in Pittsburg

=== 1. Republic of Indian Stream ===
Town of Pittsburg

"In 1832 the settlers of the area between Indian Stream and Hall's Stream, claimed by both Canada and the United States, set up the independent republic of Indian Stream. Yielding to New Hampshire in 1836, Indian Stream became part of Pittsburg and in 1842 was recognized by treaty as United States territory."

Note: this marker was erected in 1958.

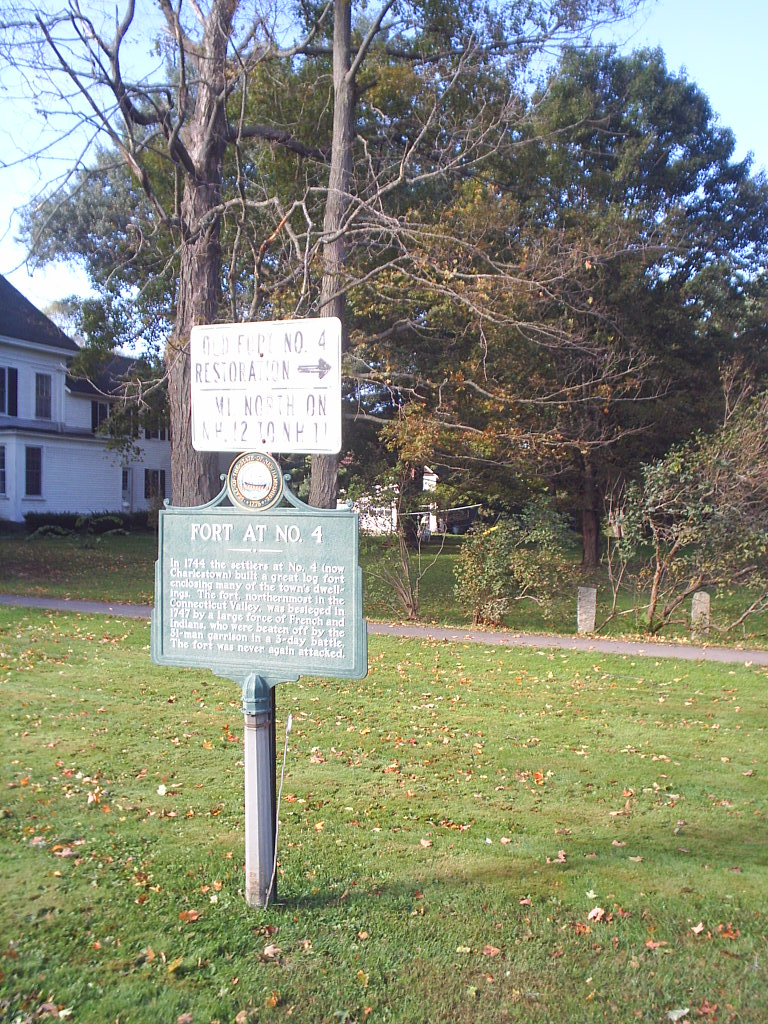
Marker for Fort at No. 4 along NH Route 12

=== 2. Fort at No. 4 ===
Town of Charlestown

"In 1744 the settlers at No. 4 (now Charlestown) built a great log fort enclosing many of the town's dwellings. The fort, northernmost in the Connecticut Valley, was besieged in 1747 by a large force of French and Indians, who were beaten off by the 31-man garrison in a 3-day battle. The fort was never again attacked."

=== 3. Birthplace of Horace Greeley ===
Town of Amherst

"About five miles north of Amherst is the birthplace of Horace Greeley (1811-1872), founder of the New York Tribune, member of Congress, and candidate for President in 1872."

Note: this marker was erected in 1958.

=== 4. William & Mary Raids ===
Town of New Castle

"Dec. 14–15, 1774, several hundred men overpowered the small British garrison at Castle William & Mary, now Fort Constitution, New Castle, and removed quantities of military supplies. These raids, set off by Paul Revere's ride to Portsmouth on Dec. 13, were among the first overt acts of the American Revolution."

=== 5. George A. Wentworth 1835–1906 ===
Town of Wakefield

"This outstanding teacher and author of mathematical textbooks widely used in schools and colleges was born in North Wakefield. He was graduated from Harvard College in 1858 after attending Wakefield Academy and Phillips Exeter Academy and taught at the latter school for 33 years."

=== 6. Sarah Josepha Buell Hale 1788–1879 ===
Town of Newport

"Prominent humanitarian, poet and author was born and taught school in Guild section of Newport. Widowed mother of five, she edited 'Godey's Lady's Book', 1837–1877; composed poem now called, 'Mary Had a Little Lamb'; advocated proclamation of Thanksgiving Day as national festival; and appealed constantly for higher education for women."

Note: this marker was erected in 1962.

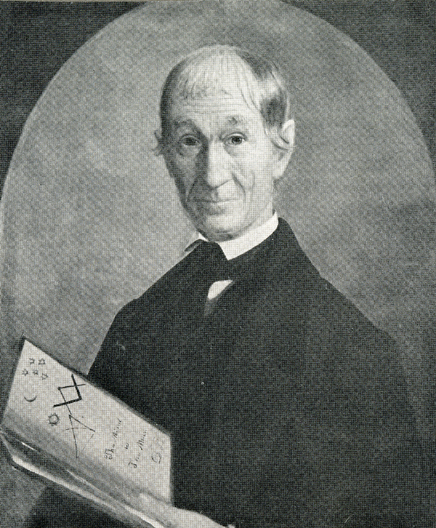
Dudley Leavitt, publisher

=== 7. Dudley Leavitt 1772–1851 ===
Town of Center Harbor

"Author and publisher of almanacs first appearing in 1797. Best known was 'Leavitt's Farmers' Almanac and Miscellaneous Year Book' which was continued after his death for about 45 years. This publication provided information vital to domestic and agricultural life of the period. He lived in house 200 yards east." (Note: While the marker claims that following Leavitt's death the almanac continued "for about 45 years" (i.e. circa 1896), there are extant copies of almanacs dated as late as 1938. In addition, Leavitt's years of birth and death are listed as 1767–1839 by the Grantham Historical Society.)

=== 8. Site of Piscataqua Bridge ===
Town of Durham

"At end of next road southeast, this engineering feat was used from 1794 to 1855. It joined Fox Point, Newington, and Meader's Neck, Durham, via Goat Island. Also site, in same period, of proposed state capital, Franklin City, and beginning of First New Hampshire Turnpike (Note: See also List of turnpikes in New Hampshire.) - vital route for instate traffic."

=== 9. Stone Iron Furnace ===
Town of Franconia

"Due west stands New Hampshire's sole surviving example of a post-Revolutionary furnace for smelting local iron ore. The industry flourished during first half of 19th century. It produced pig iron and bar iron for farm tools and cast iron ware, including famous 'Franconia Stoves.'"

=== 10. First Textile Mills ===
Town of New Ipswich

"Established in New Hampshire at New Ipswich in early 1800s for the carding, spinning and weaving of cotton and wool. This manufacture of fabrics spread throughout the state and contributed prominently to its economic and social growth and the development of the textile industry nationally."

Note: this marker was erected in 1962.

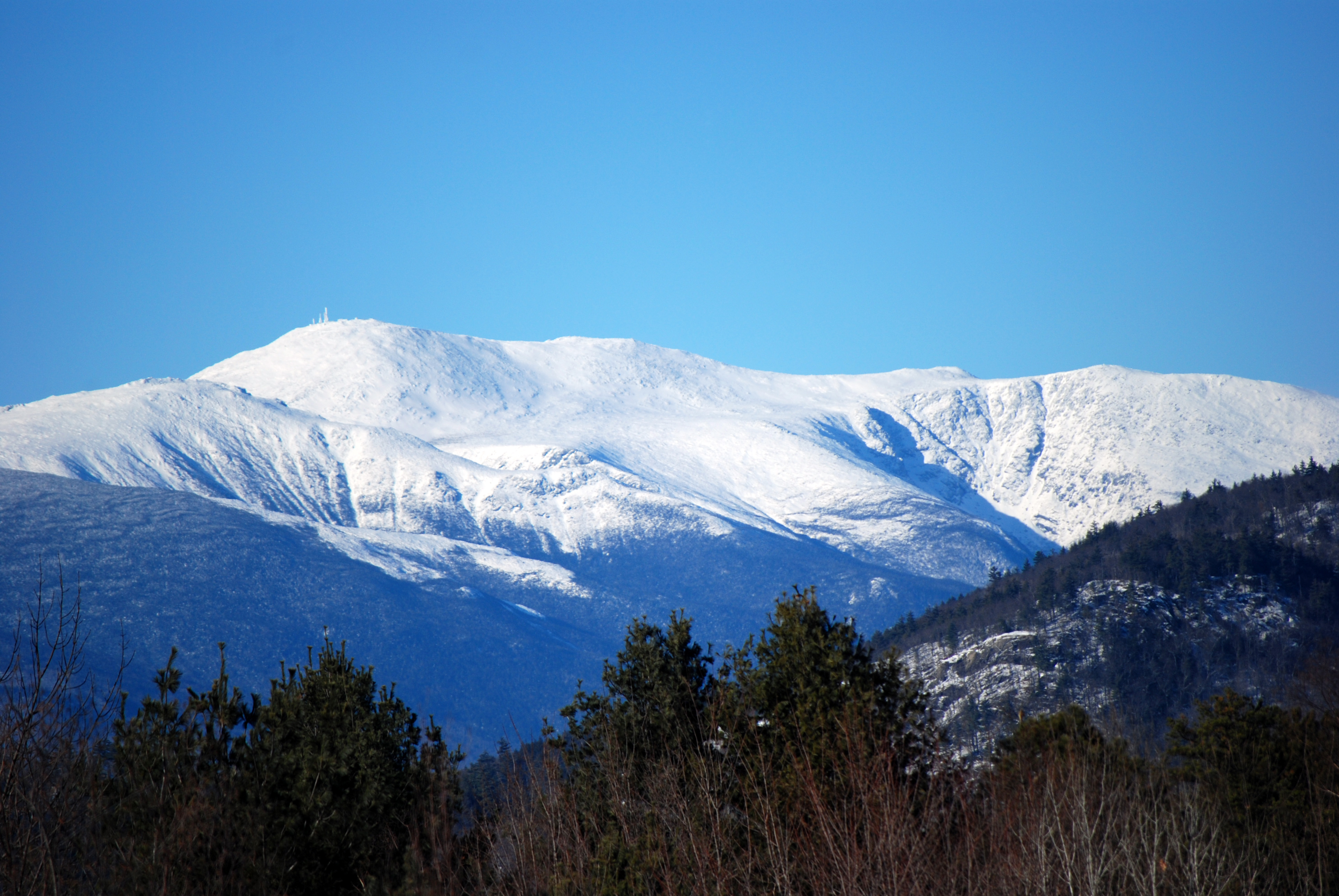
A winter view of Mount Washington

=== 11. First Ascent of Mount Washington ===
Township of Pinkham's Grant

"Darby Field, a New Hampshire settler, accomplished this difficult feat in 1642 from a southerly approach. Partly guided by Indians and with only primitive equipment at his disposal, he is thus alleged to be the originator of all Mount Washington ascensions."

=== 12. Temple Glass Factory ===
Town of Sharon

"Was located at a secluded site in the southwest portion of Temple township. Founded in 1780 by Robert Hewes who employed Hessian mercenaries from the British Army trained in the art of glass-blowing. This early attempt to manufacture bottles and crude window-glass was beginning of glass-making in New Hampshire."

=== 13. Hannah Davis – Amos Fortune ===
Town of Jaffrey

"Buried behind Jaffrey's colonial Meeting House nearby are 'Aunt' Hannah Davis, 1784-1863, resourceful and beloved spinster who made, trademarked and sold this country's first wooden bandboxes; (Note: A bandbox is a box of lightweight construction (e.g. cardboard, thin wood) for carrying hats or other apparel items.) and Amos Fortune, 1710-1801, African-born slave who purchased his freedom, established a tannery and left funds for the Jaffrey church and schools."

Note: this marker was erected in 1963.

=== 14. Early American Clocks ===
Town of Chester

"Isaac Blasdel, 1738-1791, son and father of clockmakers, settled in Chester in 1762 and commenced manufacturing one-day, striking, wall and tall-case clocks with one weight and metal works. He was an Association Test signer, Revolutionary War soldier, selectman and member of the Committee of Safety."

Note: this marker was erected in 1963.

=== 15. Shaker Village ===
Town of Loudon

"Take opposite road 2.6 miles to the attractive buildings of this Utopian community organized in 1792 in the township of Canterbury. The Shakers established high standards of agricultural efficiency, craftsmanship and domestic skill for their sect and extended this worthy influence beyond the confines of the Village."

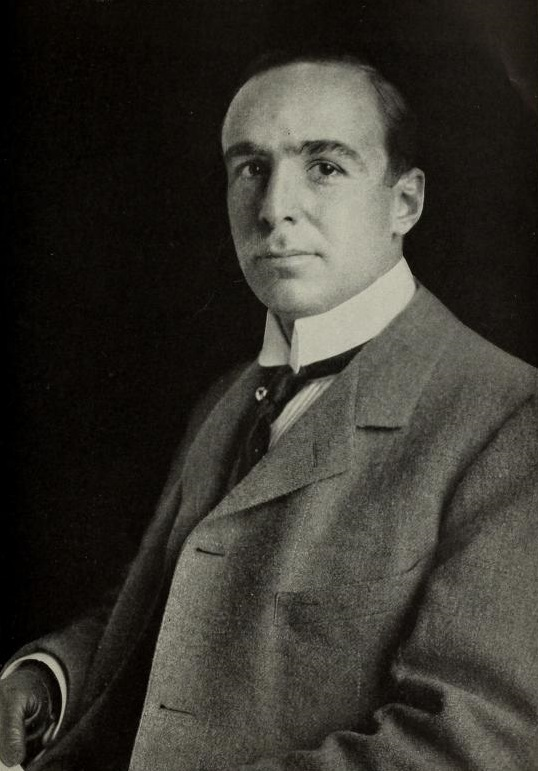
Winston Churchill, novelist

=== 16. Winston Churchill 1871–1947 ===
Town of Cornish

"American author of best-selling novels, such as 'Coniston', written between 1898-1941 and partly based upon actual experience in New Hampshire politics. His nearby residence, 'Harlakenden House', was built in 1898 and burned in 1923. It also served as a summer home for President Woodrow Wilson in 1913, 1914 and 1915."

=== 17. Old Province Road ===
Town of Gilmanton

"One of the earliest highways in New Hampshire, it was authorized in 1765 as a supply route from the tide-water port of Durham to the colony's northern settlements in the Coos. This section of the road through Gilmanton was built in 1770 nine years after the township was settled."

Note: this marker was erected in 1963.

=== 18. Isles of Shoals ===
Town of Rye

"About six miles offshore, these nine rocky islands served Europeans as a fishing station before the first mainland settlements were made in 1623. Capt. John Smith (1580-1631) named the group 'Smith's Isles' in 1614. The codfish that 'shoaled' or schooled there in huge numbers were a prized delicacy that supported 300 to 600 inhabitants before the revolution. By the mid-1800s, new hotels attracted a summer colony of writers and artists, chief of whom was poet Celia Thaxter (1835-1894). The Islands have supported religious conferences since 1897 and marine research since 1928."

=== 19. Thaddeus S. C. Lowe 1832–1913 ===
Town of Jefferson

"Born nearby, this inventor and scientist gained unique distinction as a pioneer aeronaut in the United States. He organized and directed a military balloon force during the Civil War and later invented a number of important and basic devices for use in atmospheric observation and metallurgical processing."

=== 20. Captain Lovewell's War ===
Town of Ossipee

"Was fought between 1722 and 1725 against several tribes of eastern Indians. The principal campaigns took place in the Ossipee region and led to the eventual withdrawal of the Indians to the north. Commemorated in Colonial literature by 'The Ballad of Lovewell's Fight.'"

Note: this marker was erected in 1964.

=== 21. Canaan Street ===
Town of Canaan

"First known as 'Broad Street,' this early venture in town planning was laid out in 1788. About a mile in length and beautifully situated, starting about two miles in on next northerly road, the plan provided for an orderly arrangement of attractive homesteads."

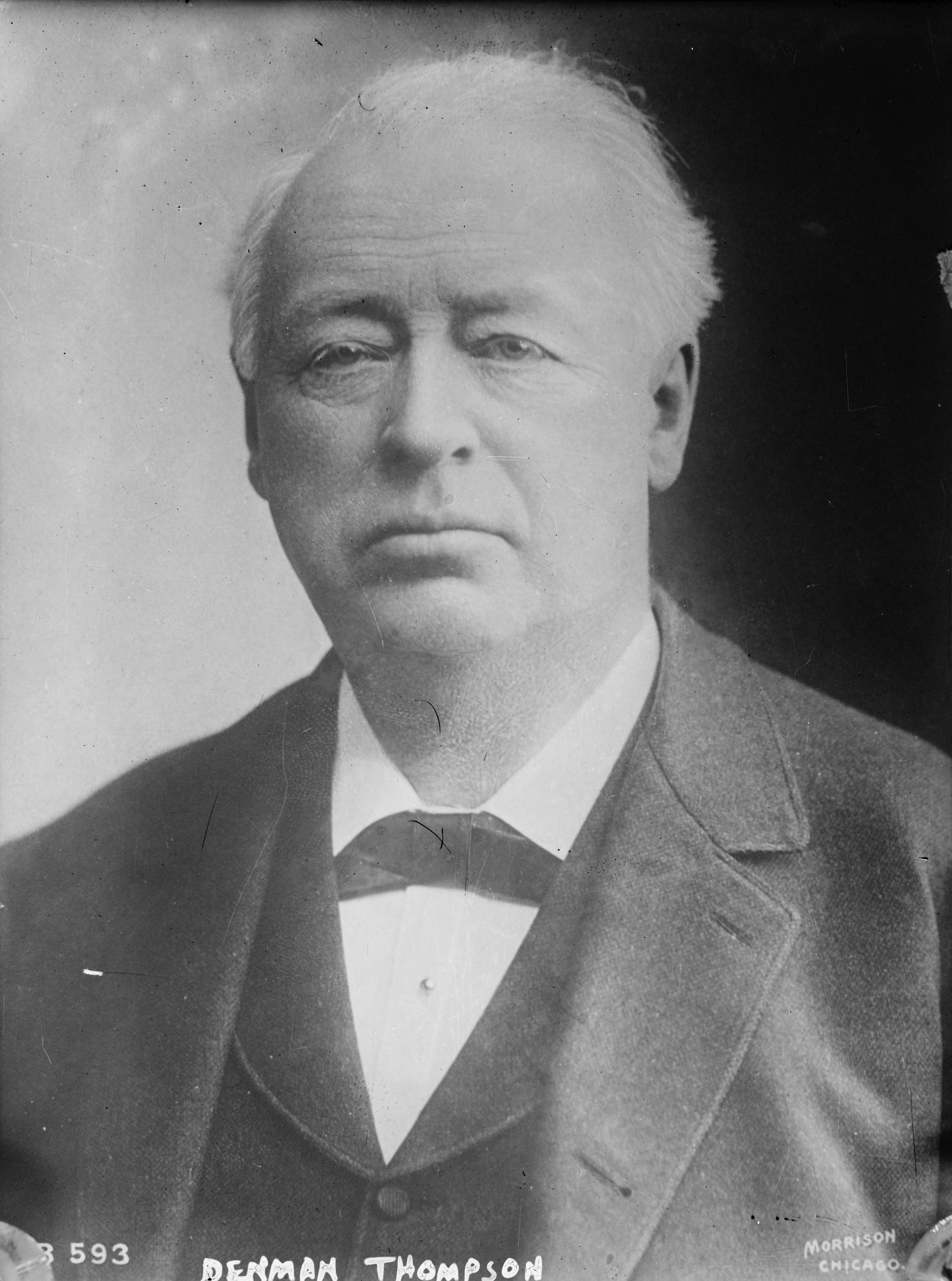
Denman Thompson, playwright and theatre actor

=== 22. Denman Thompson 1833–1911 ===
Town of Swanzey

"A famous theatrical trouper who lived and died in West Swanzey. He gained a national reputation by his portrayal of the character, 'Joshua Whitcomb,' the New Hampshire farmer on a trip to Boston. From this he subsequently evolved 'The Old Homestead,' a play of long runs before enthusiastic audiences."

Note: this marker was erected in 1964.

=== 23. Soapstone ===
Town of Francestown

"A large deposit of highest quality was discovered early in the 19th century at northerly section of Francestown by Daniel Fuller. During the heyday of its popularity, various common uses of this non-metallic mineral (steatite), when quarried, were for sinks, water pipes, stoves, hearths, warming stones, mantels and industrial purposes."

Note: this marker was erected in 1964.

=== 24. LaFayette's Tour ===
Town of Northwood

"Upon invitation of President Monroe, issued at the request of Congress, Marquis de LaFayette, Revolutionary War hero, revisited the United States for a goodwill tour which included an extensive visit to New Hampshire towns. He passed this spot June 23, 1825, traveling between Concord and Dover."

Note: this marker was erected in 1964.

=== 25. Major John Simpson ===
Town of Deerfield

"Born in Deerfield and buried in Old Center Cemetery on road west, he gained fame by the unauthorized firing of the first shot at Bunker Hill while serving as a private in Captain Dearborn's Company of Colonel Stark's Regiment. Although reprimanded for this disobedience, he afterward served his country with honor."

Note: between the title and main text is a directional arrow, rarely seen on the state's markers.
