= Chase R. Whitcher =

American architect (1876–1940)

Chase Roy Whitcher
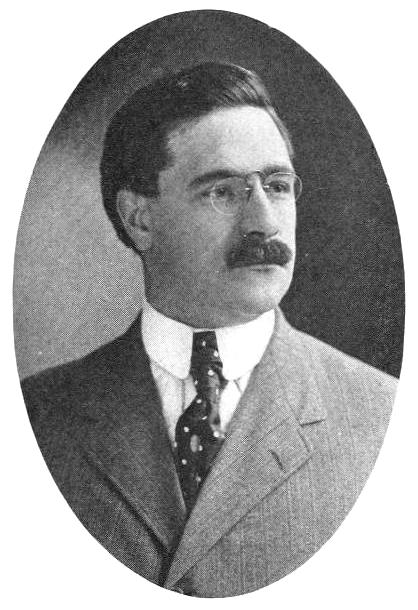
- Whitcher c. 1907
- Born: December 8, 1876; Lisbon, New Hampshire
- Died: August 25, 1940 (aged 63); Manchester, New Hampshire
- Occupation: Architect

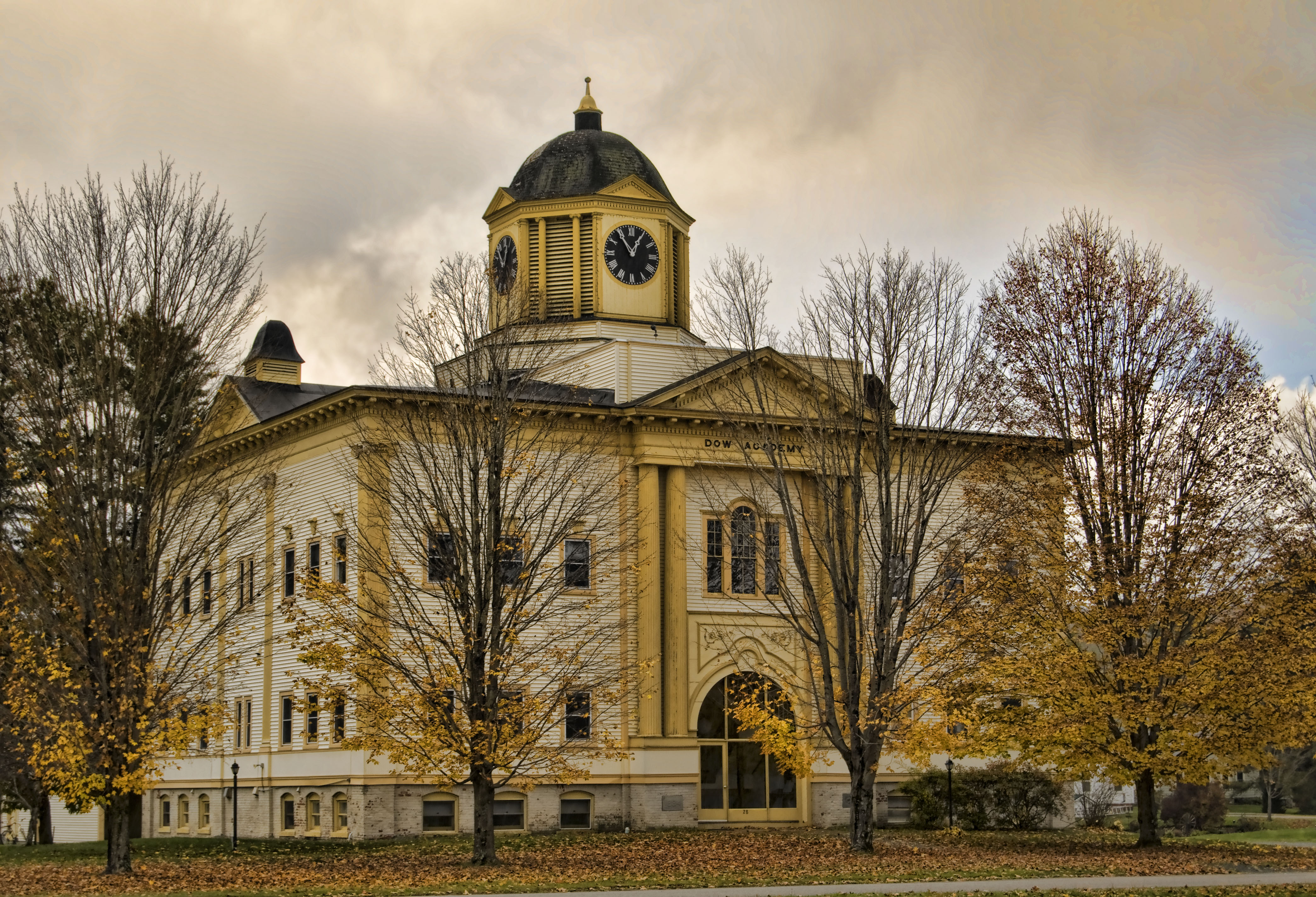
Dow Academy in Franconia, designed by Whitcher in the Colonial Revival style and completed in 1903.

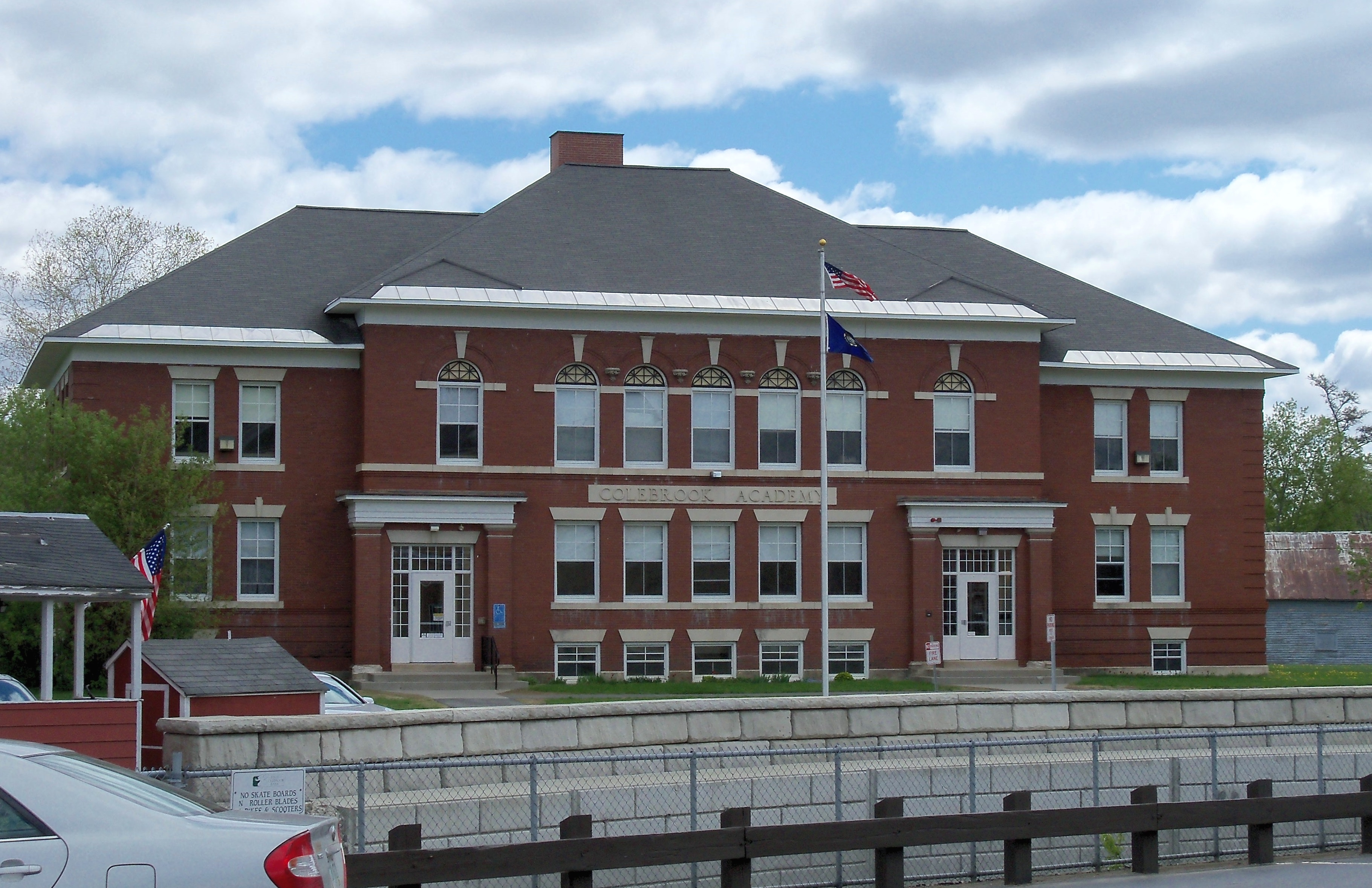
Colebrook Academy in Colebrook, designed by Whitcher in the Colonial Revival style and completed in 1911.

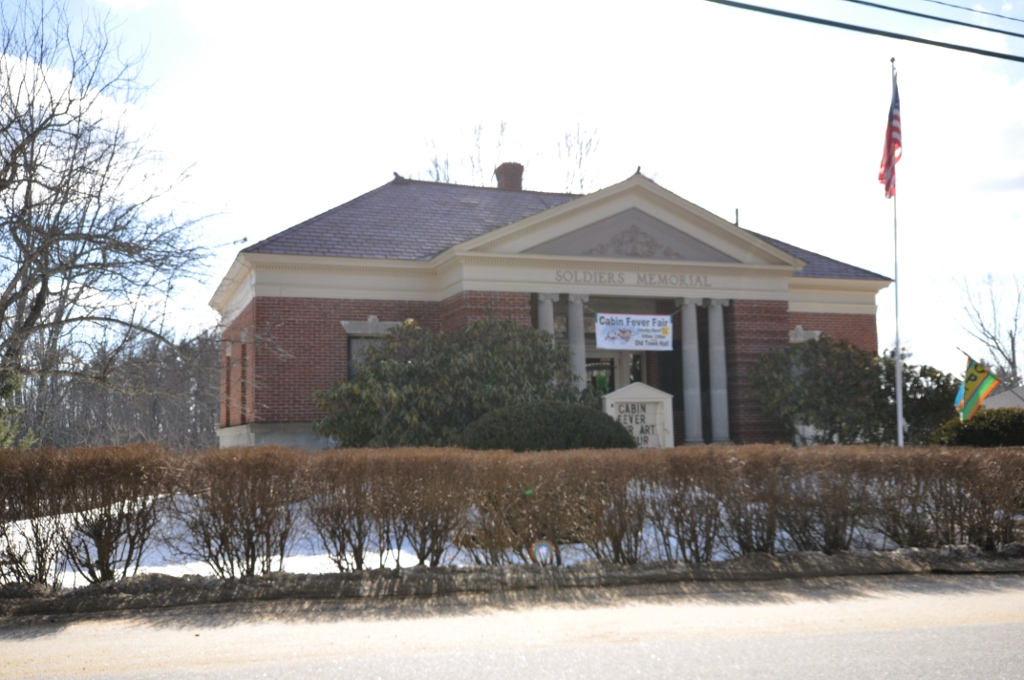
The Soldiers Memorial Building in Deerfield, designed by Whitcher in the Colonial Revival style and completed in 1914.

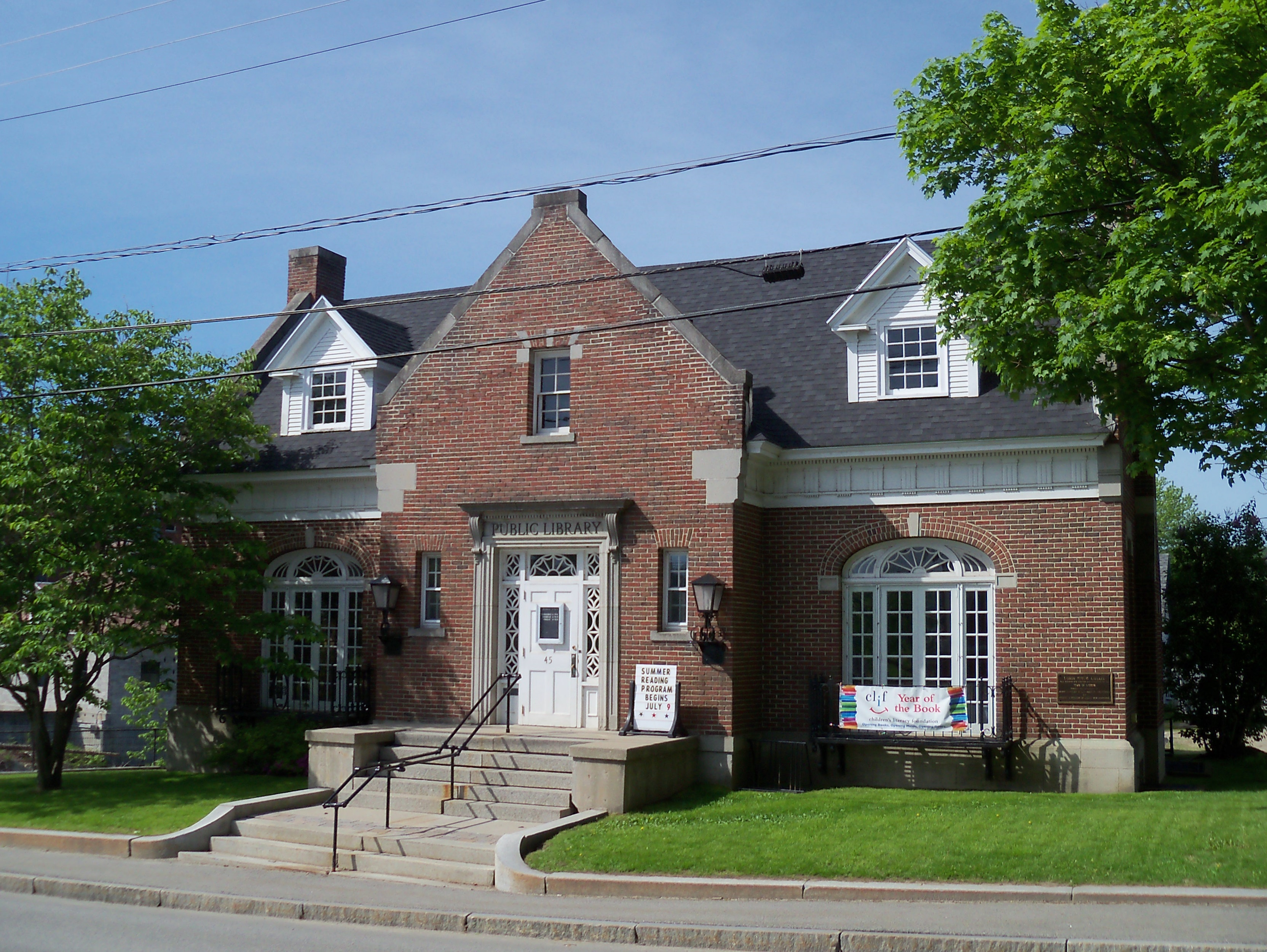
The Lisbon Public Library in Lisbon, designed by Whitcher in the Colonial Revival style and built in 1926.

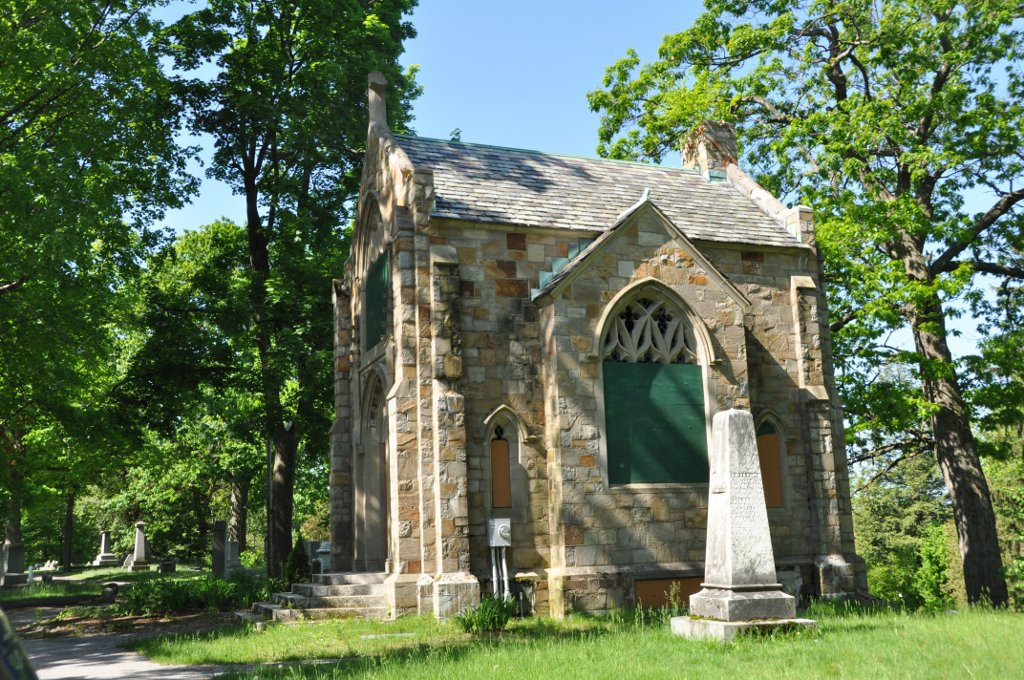
The chapel of Valley Cemetery in Manchester, designed by Whitcher in the Gothic Revival style and completed in 1932.

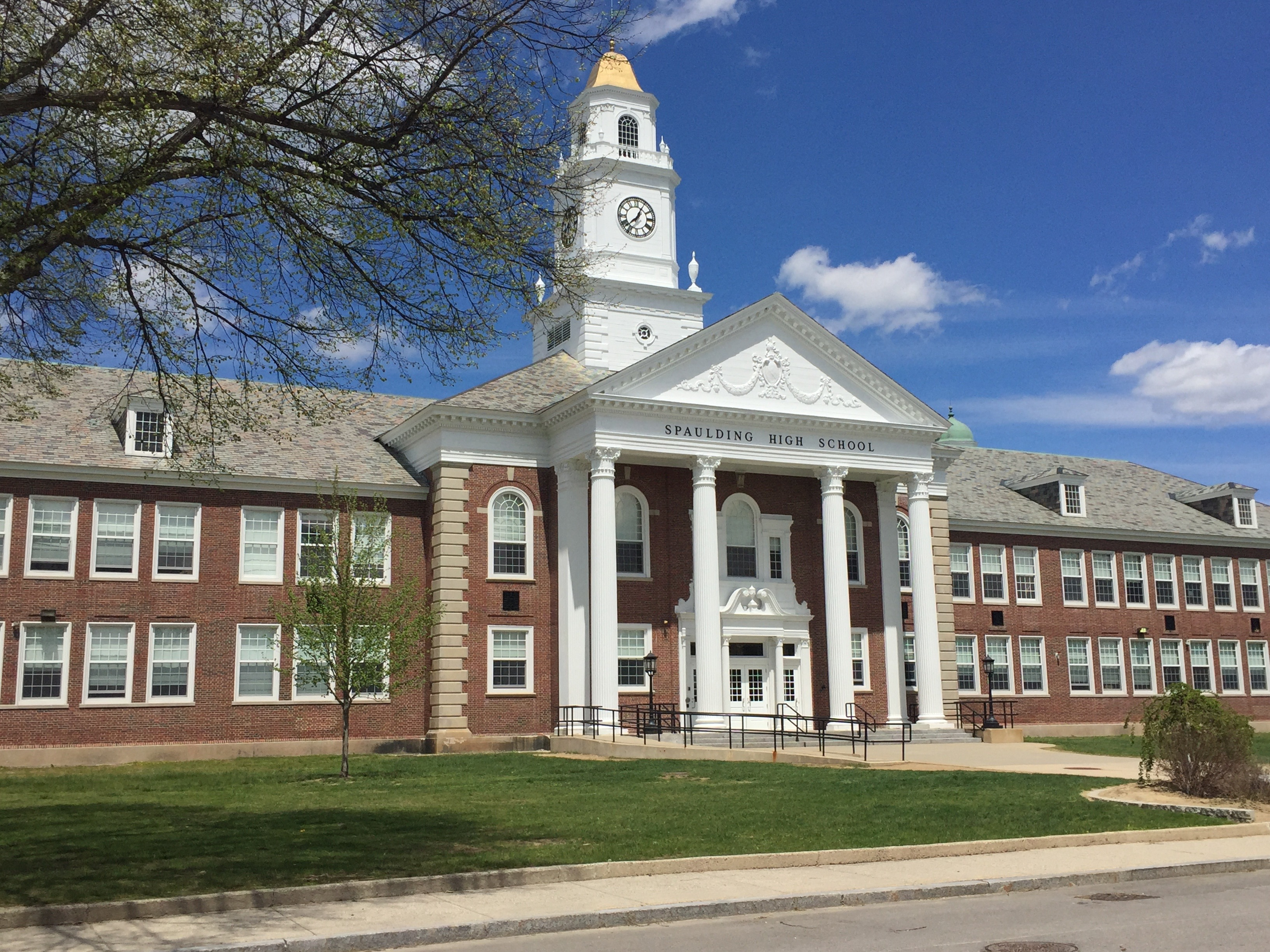
Spaulding High School in Rochester, designed by Whitcher in the Colonial Revival style and completed in 1939.

Chase R. Whitcher (December 8, 1876 – August 25, 1940) was an American architect in practice in Lisbon and Manchester, New Hampshire, from 1903 until his death in 1940. He served as State Architect from 1913 until the office was abolished in 1915.

== Life and career ==
Chase Roy Whitcher was born December 8, 1876, in Lisbon, New Hampshire, to Ward Priest Whitcher and Pheeb H. Whitcher, née Perkins. He studied architecture at the Massachusetts Institute of Technology and with architects in Boston, but did not receive a degree. In 1898 Whitcher returned to Lisbon, where he began working as an architect, probably with local contractor L. W. Goudie. In 1903 he established an independent architect's office in Lisbon. Circa 1907 he moved this office to Manchester, but kept his residence and family in Lisbon. By 1909, his wife and children had joined him in Manchester. For his entire time in Manchester, Whitcher kept his office in the Beacon Building, the city's most prestigious business address. Whitcher was in continuous practice in Manchester until his death in 1940. He was assisted during his career by at least two other architects, George O. Peabody and Roland S. Simonds, and several draftsmen. New Hampshire architects Carl E. Peterson and Malcolm D. Hildreth also worked in his office.

In August 1913 Whitcher was appointed New Hampshire's second and last State Architect, (Note: Whitcher replaced J. Edward Baker of Manchester, who had filled the office since it was established in May of 1913.) having charge of design and construction of buildings at the various state institutions. The office was abolished in 1915.

After Whitcher's death, Simonds continued the practice, working until his own death in 1963.

== Personal life ==
In 1898 Whitcher married Eda M. Aldrich, also a native of Lisbon. They had two daughters.

After several years of renting in Lisbon and Manchester, circa 1915 Whitcher built a home for his family at 1153 Union Street in Manchester. This was a traditional Colonial Revival home, and Whitcher lived there until his death.

Whitcher died August 25, 1940, in Manchester.

== Legacy ==
Almost all of Whitcher's buildings were designed in the popular Colonial Revival and Beaux-Arts styles, with only occasional forays in the Gothic Revival or eclectic styles. During his lifetime, Whitcher was best known as an architect of schools and public buildings, but is today best remembered for Hampshire House at The Balsams in Dixville Notch, one of the largest and most elaborate buildings of its time in New Hampshire.

At least six of Whitcher's works have been listed on the United States National Register of Historic Places, and others contribute to listed historic districts.

== Architectural works ==
- Bank Block, Lisbon, New Hampshire (1902)
- Boynton Block, Lisbon, New Hampshire (1902)
- Dow Academy, Franconia, New Hampshire (1903, NRHP-listed 1982)
- Littleton Hospital (former), (Note: Presently a senior residence known as Beattie House.) Littleton, New Hampshire (1906–07)
- Laconia Hospital, Laconia, New Hampshire (1907–08, demolished)
- Pembroke Village School (former), Suncook, New Hampshire (1907–08)
- Remodeling of the Dunlap Building, (Note: Originally built in 1879.) Manchester, New Hampshire (1908, NRHP-listed 2004)
- Beaumont Hall, Tilton School, Tilton, New Hampshire (1909)
- Bedford Town Hall, Bedford, New Hampshire (1909–10, NRHP-listed 1984)
- Quinby Building, Laconia State School, Laconia, New Hampshire (1909)
- Bath Town Hall, Bath, New Hampshire (1910)
- Colebrook Academy, Colebrook, New Hampshire (1910–11)
- Lincoln Chambers, (Note: Presently known as Cathedral Place.) Manchester, New Hampshire (1910–11)
- Warner Town Hall, Warner, New Hampshire (1910)
- Brown School (former), Manchester, New Hampshire (1911–12)
- Maynard School (former), Manchester, New Hampshire (1911–12)
- Soldiers Memorial Building, (Note: A contributing building to the Deerfield Center Historic District, listed on the NRHP in 2002.) Deerfield, New Hampshire (1913–14)
- First Congregational Church, Lisbon, New Hampshire (1914)
- Portsmouth State Armory, Portsmouth, New Hampshire (1914–16, demolished 2004)
- Mary Lyon Hall, Plymouth State University, Plymouth, New Hampshire (1915–16)
- Merchants National Bank Building, (Note: Manchester's second skyscraper, following the Amoskeag Bank Building.) Manchester, New Hampshire (1915, demolished)
- Stratford Public School, North Stratford, New Hampshire (1915–16)
- Hampshire House, The Balsams, Dixville Notch, New Hampshire (1916–18, NRHP-listed 2002)
- Manchester Practical Arts High School (former), Manchester, New Hampshire (1920)
- Weston School, Manchester, New Hampshire (1921)
- A. Crosby Kennett High School (former), (Note: Presently the A. A. Crosby Kennett Middle School.) Conway, New Hampshire (1922–23)
- Manchester Country Club, Bedford, New Hampshire (1922–23)
- Brown Building, New Hampshire State Hospital, Concord, New Hampshire (1923–24)
- Millville School, Concord, New Hampshire (1923, NRHP-listed 1985)
- Capitol Theatre and Masonic Temple, Concord, New Hampshire (1925–27)
- Huntress Hall, Keene State College, Keene, New Hampshire (1925–26)
- Masonic Temple, Manchester, New Hampshire (1925)
- Butterfield Hall, Keene State College, Keene, New Hampshire (1926–27)
- Lisbon Public Library, Lisbon, New Hampshire (1926)
- Public Service Company of New Hampshire Building, Manchester, New Hampshire (1926)
- General Draper High School, (Note: A contributing building to the Hopedale Village Historic District, listed on the NRHP in 2002.) Hopedale, Massachusetts (1927)
- Rhodes Hall, (Note: Originally known as Spaulding Gymnasium.) Keene State College, Keene, New Hampshire (1927–28)
- Col. Town Community House, Lancaster, New Hampshire (1927)
- Cogswell Memorial School, Henniker, New Hampshire (1930–31)
- Pembroke Fire Station (former), Suncook, New Hampshire (1930)
- Tobey Building, New Hampshire State Hospital, Concord, New Hampshire (1930)
- Chapel, Valley Cemetery, Manchester, New Hampshire (1932, NRHP-listed 2004)
- Spaulding Memorial School, Townsend, Massachusetts (1932)
- Greenville Consolidated School, Greenville, Maine (1933)
- Pfeiffer Hall, Tilton School, Tilton, New Hampshire (1938)
- Spaulding High School, Rochester, New Hampshire (1938–39)
