= Phineas Stevens =

Officer noted for his defense of Fort at Number 4

Capt. Phineas Stevens (20 February 1706 – 6 April 1756) was a distinguished officer noted for his defense of the Fort at Number 4 during a siege in April 1747, when a combined force of French and Native American soldiers failed to capture the fort and the 32 British soldiers defending it. Stevens was born in Sudbury, Massachusetts and was one of the fort's founders, serving as commander of the militia until 1750; he was also one of the earliest Anglo-American colonists to settle in the area. Stevens was active during King George's War and the French and Indian War, and died at Halifax Harbour, Nova Scotia in 1756.
