= Marie (died 1759) =

Marie (died 1759) was an enslaved Cree person who was sentenced to death in Trois-Rivières, New France.

Little is known of her before August 1759. She is described as panis (a French Canadian term used to describe any enslaved First Nations person) and she was probably born in a Cree village. Marie was enslaved by military officer Joseph Boucher de Niverville and forced to serve his family in Trois-Rivières.

On 20 August 1759 there was a dispute between Marie and Boucher de Niverville's wife, Marie-Josephte Chastelain, and his mother, Marguerite. Marie took a kitchen knife that she had been sharpening and struck the two women with it, slightly wounding both of them. She then fled to the attic where she attempted to hang herself, but she was discovered by Nicolas-Joseph de Noyelles. Marie recovered, despite a treatment of bloodletting by a surgeon.

Marie was charged with attempting suicide and attempted murder against the two women, a capital offense. As Marie apparently spoke little or no French, she was provided with two interpreters, Joseph Chevalier (an armourer) and another named only as Saint-Jean. It's likely that both spoke Ottawa dialect rather than Marie's Cree language. Marie claimed that she had meant to scare, but not hurt, the women, but on 11 September she was found guilty "of having inflicted knife wounds mentioned in the procedure and then of having hanged herself" and condemned to be "beaten and flogged naked with rods by the executioner of haute justice at the crossroads," branded, banished, and fined three livres.

The sentence was appealed by crown attorney Joseph-Marie Godefroy de Tonnancour who considered it too lenient. The colony's Conseil Supérieur in Montréal agreed, and, on 29 December 1759 they ordered "the said Marie, Indian, to be hanged and strangled until death do ensue on a gallows erected for that purpose in the marketplace of this town...[and] her dead body be exposed for two hours."
