= Millville School =

- U.S. National Register of Historic Places
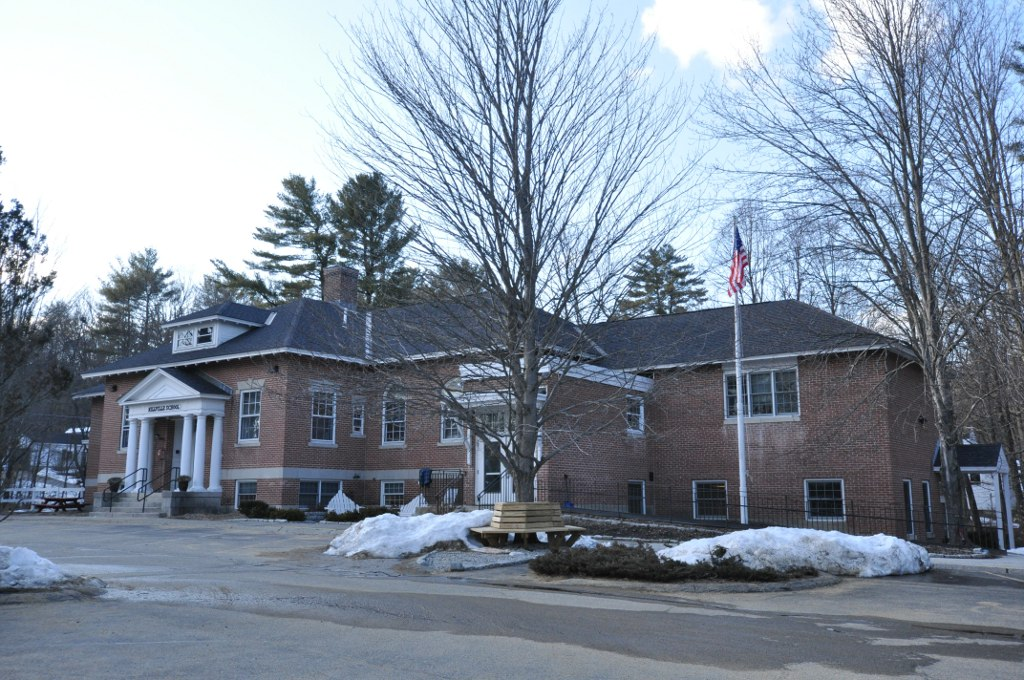

- Location within New Hampshire Location within the United States
- Location: 2 Fiske Rd., Concord, New Hampshire
- Coordinates: 43°11′51″N 71°34′27″W
- Area: less than one acre
- Built: 1923
- Built by: Hutchinson Building Company
- Architect: Chase R. Whitcher
- Architectural style: Colonial Revival, Georgian Revival
- NRHP reference No.: 85002781
- Added to NRHP: November 7, 1985

The Millville School is a historic school building at 2 Fisk Road, just off Hopkinton Road in western Concord, New Hampshire. Built in 1923, it is a prominent local work of New Hampshire native Chase R. Whitcher, and is Concord's only school in the Georgian Revival style. It is also the only surviving element of the historic village of Millville that is not part of the nearby St. Paul's School campus. The building was listed on the National Register of Historic Places in 1985. It now houses Parker Academy, a private day school.

== Description and history ==
The Millville School stands in a rural-residential area of western Concord, at the northeast corner of Hopkinton Road and Fisk Road. It is located across the street from the St. Paul's School campus. It is a single-story brick building with Georgian Revival features. It is covered by a hip roof, and has a projecting entry section, with a portico supported by grouped round Tuscan columns. Windows are set in rectangular openings with splayed keystoned stone lintels.

The Millville area of Concord developed in the late 18th century as a small industrial village, most of whose surviving remnants are part of the St. Paul's campus. The first public school was built on the south side of Hopkinton Street in 1801, and was replaced by a larger frame building in 1860. When St. Paul's sought to expand its campus in 1895, that building was moved across the street to this location. This building was constructed in 1923 to a design by New Hampshire architect Chase R. Whitcher, and is the only public building of that style in the city. The T-shaped building was extended in 1954 to add a kindergarten wing to the east, and underwent other relatively minor alterations in the 1980s, when the building was converted for use by a medical practice.

== See also ==
- National Register of Historic Places listings in Merrimack County, New Hampshire
