= Merrimack County Courthouse =

- U.S. National Register of Historic Places
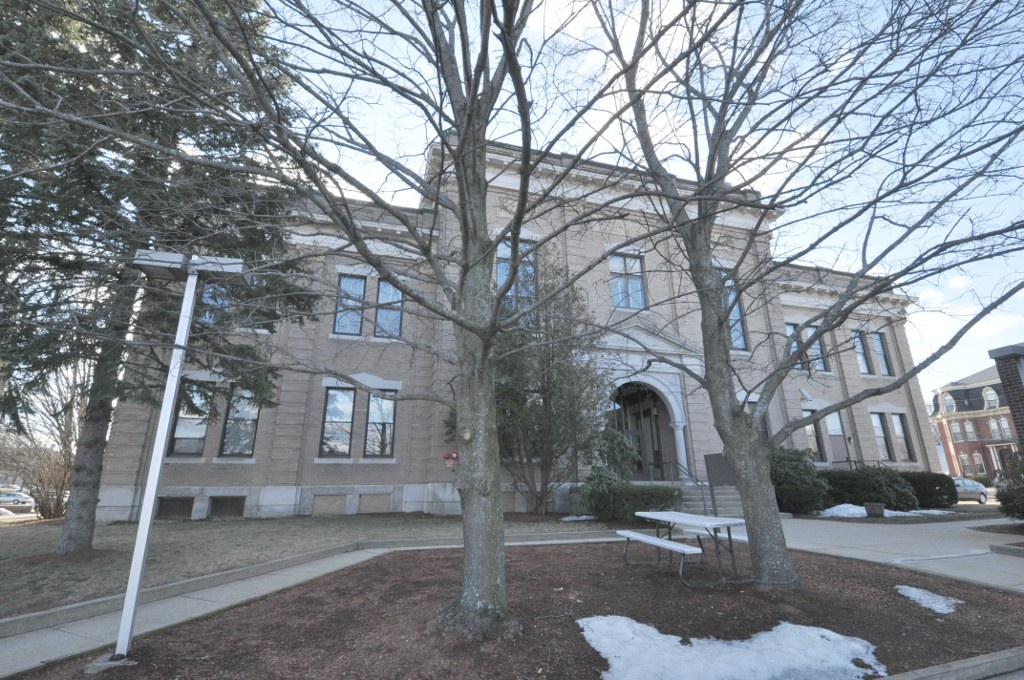

- Location within New Hampshire Location within the United States
- Interactive map showing the location of Merrimack County Courthouse
- Location: 163 N. Main St., Concord, New Hampshire
- Coordinates: 43°12′35″N 71°32′20″W
- Area: 1.3 acres (0.53 ha)
- Built: 1857
- Architect: Joshua L. Foster; George S. Forrest
- Architectural style: Late 19th And 20th Century Revivals, Neo-Renaissance
- NRHP reference No.: 79000202
- Added to NRHP: November 27, 1979

The former Merrimack County Courthouse stands at 163 North Main Street in Concord, New Hampshire, the state capital and county seat of Merrimack County. The oldest part of the courthouse building is a brick and granite two-story structure, completed in 1857 to serve as a town hall and court building. The city and county used the building for town offices and county courts until 1904, when the city sold its interest in the building to the county. Between 1905 and 1907 the building was extensively remodeled to plans by local architect George S. Forrest. The courthouse has been listed on the National Register of Historic Places since 1979. As of 2018, a new courthouse had been constructed to the rear of the building, and county offices were to be moved into the original building.

== Building history ==
The site where the courthouse stands has been used for civic purposes since 1790, when Concord, then a town, built a townhouse on the site. That building was enlarged in 1823 when Merrimack County was created, with Concord as its shire town. That building served both town and county functions until 1855. The present building was built in response to the need for more space by both governments and was completed in 1857 to a design by New Hampshire native Joshua L. Foster. That design had more Classical Revival features than the building has now, with a mainly granite exterior, a 33-foot (10 m) dome on top and an arcaded front porch across the facade.

The building served both city and county in that form until 1904, when the city sold its interest in the building to the county, and built a new city hall. The county then decided to renovate rather than replace the building, work which was completed in 1907. Significant alterations included the removal of the dome and arcade, construction of the Renaissance entry pavilion, and refacing the exterior in brick. A modern wing was added to the front (east side) of the building in the 20th century.

== See also ==
- National Register of Historic Places listings in Merrimack County, New Hampshire
