= John Simpson (soldier) =

American Revolutionary War soldier

- Born: December 1, 1748; Deerfield, New Hampshire
- Died: October 28, 1825 (aged 76)
- Military career
- Allegiance: United States
- Branch: United States Army
- Service years: 1775–1783
- Rank: Major
- Conflicts: American Revolutionary War: Battles of Lexington and Concord; Battle of Bunker Hill
- Other work: Farmer

Major John Simpson (December 1, 1748 – October 28, 1825) was an American Revolutionary War soldier from Deerfield, New Hampshire. He is one of several men traditionally described as having fired the first shot on the American side at the Battle of Bunker Hill.

== Military career ==
After the shooting in the Revolutionary War began at Lexington and Concord, Simpson joined a company of militiamen under Captain Henry Dearborn. The company marched to Boston and joined the siege of that town. At the Battle of Bunker Hill, Colonel John Stark instructed his men of the 1st New Hampshire Regiment to hold their fire until the British had reached a certain point. According to the story, Simpson fired early and was arrested the next day for disobeying orders, but was not punished.

Simpson eventually rose to the rank of major in the New Hampshire state troops. After the war, he returned to his farm.

John Simpson's musket was directly passed through the Simpson family for 10 generations. It is now displayed at the National Museum of Military Vehicles in Dubois, Wyoming.

== Later life ==
Coat of Arms of John Simpson

In 1785, Simpson married Mary Whidden. Two blacks were given to them by Whidden's mother. They were not considered slaves; however, they were considered a part of his family. While married, the two had 6 children: Joseph Langdon (February 8, 1787 – February 28, 1808), Thomas (August 2, 1788 – December 1, 1872), John Jr. (March 2, 1790 – February 8, 1868), Samuel (January 29, 1792 – January 13, 1872), Mary (June 5, 1794 – November 11, 1832), and Hannah (April 29, 1797 – July 18, 1872).

Simpson died on October 28, 1825, and was originally buried in his family lot. This graveyard was not taken care of and eventually one of his descendants moved him to the Old Center cemetery, which is now part of the Old Deerfield Center Historic District. Simpson is featured on a New Hampshire historical marker (number 25) along the concurrency of Route 107 and Route 43 in Deerfield.

== Sources ==
- Smith, Chellis Vielle (July–December 1906). Broune, George Waldo (ed.). "Major John Simpson: The Man Who Fired the First Shot at Bunker Hill". Granite State Magazine. 2. Manchester, New Hampshire: Granite State Publishing.
