= Moses Dow =

New Hampshire politician

Moses Dow (Feb 17, 1747 – March 31, 1811) was a New Hampshire politician, judge, and military officer in the American Revolutionary War. Dow was elected to the Congress of the Confederation in 1784 but did not assume office due to poor health.

== Biography ==
Dow was born in 1747 in Haverhill, New Hampshire. In 1769, he married Phebe Emerson in Haverhill. They had nine children. The same year, he graduated from Harvard College after studying law.

=== Public service ===
Dow served in the Revolutionary War, achieving the commission of brigadier general in the New Hampshire Militia. Dow also served in the commonwealth as the first postmaster of Haverhill. From 1774 to 1804, he was the appointed solicitor of Grafton County, New Hampshire. In 1784 and 1785, he was appointed as a justice of the peace for Grafton County, Rockingham County, and Hillsborough County, New Hampshire, by President of New Hampshire Meshech Weare and subsequently elected as a member of the New Hampshire Senate, defeating Jonathan Freeman, who would later defeat him in a rematch.

In 1784, Dow was elected to the Congress of the Confederation, but he wrote to Weare declining the position due to poor health at the time. In 1785, he was appointed by Weare to serve as a member of the Executive Council of New Hampshire. From 1792 to 1793, Dow served as the sixth president of the New Hampshire Senate. In 1797, he was elected as a Governor's Councillor for Grafton County, New Hampshire. Dow's last position held was as judge of the New Hampshire Court of Common Pleas, serving from 1808 until his death in 1811.

=== Death ===
Dow died on March 31, 1811, at the age of 64. Moses Arnold Dow was his grandson.
