= Old Deerfield Center Historic District =

Historic district in New Hampshire, United States

- U.S. National Register of Historic Places
- U.S. Historic district
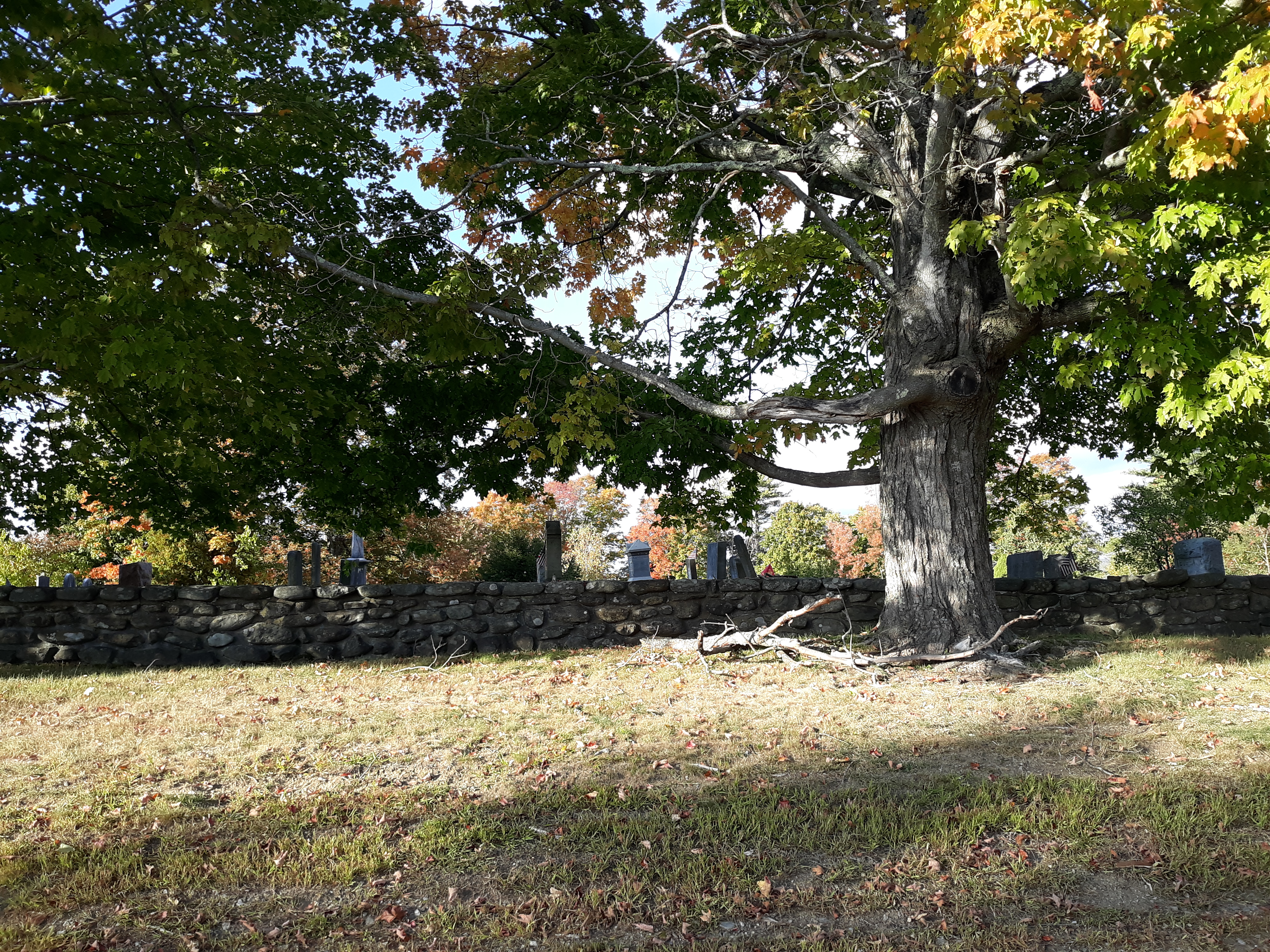
- Cemetery on Meetinghouse Hill Rd.

- Location within New Hampshire Location within the United States
- Location: 51, 58, 68, 70 Church St.; 23 Lang Rd.; 49, 51, 53 Meetinghouse Hill Rd.; 8, 20, 24, Mt. Delight Rd.; Cemetery, north side of Meetinghouse Hill Rd., Deerfield, New Hampshire
- Coordinates: 43°8′42″N 71°15′14″W
- Area: 220 acres (89 ha)
- Built: 1770 and later
- Architectural style: Georgian Colonial, Greek Revival, et al.
- NRHP reference No.: 100005162
- Added to NRHP: April 6, 2020

The Old Deerfield Center Historic District is an area in the New Hampshire town of Deerfield; it was listed on the National Register of Historic Places in 2020.

== Description and history ==
Old Deerfield Center was originally part of adjacent Nottingham, which was incorporated in 1722. Properties within the district include several Georgian Colonial homes and four Greek Revival homes. Also included is the Old Center Cemetery, where Major John Simpson of the American Revolutionary War is buried.

== See also ==
- National Register of Historic Places listings in Rockingham County, New Hampshire
