= Deerfield Town House =

- Town House
- U.S. National Register of Historic Places
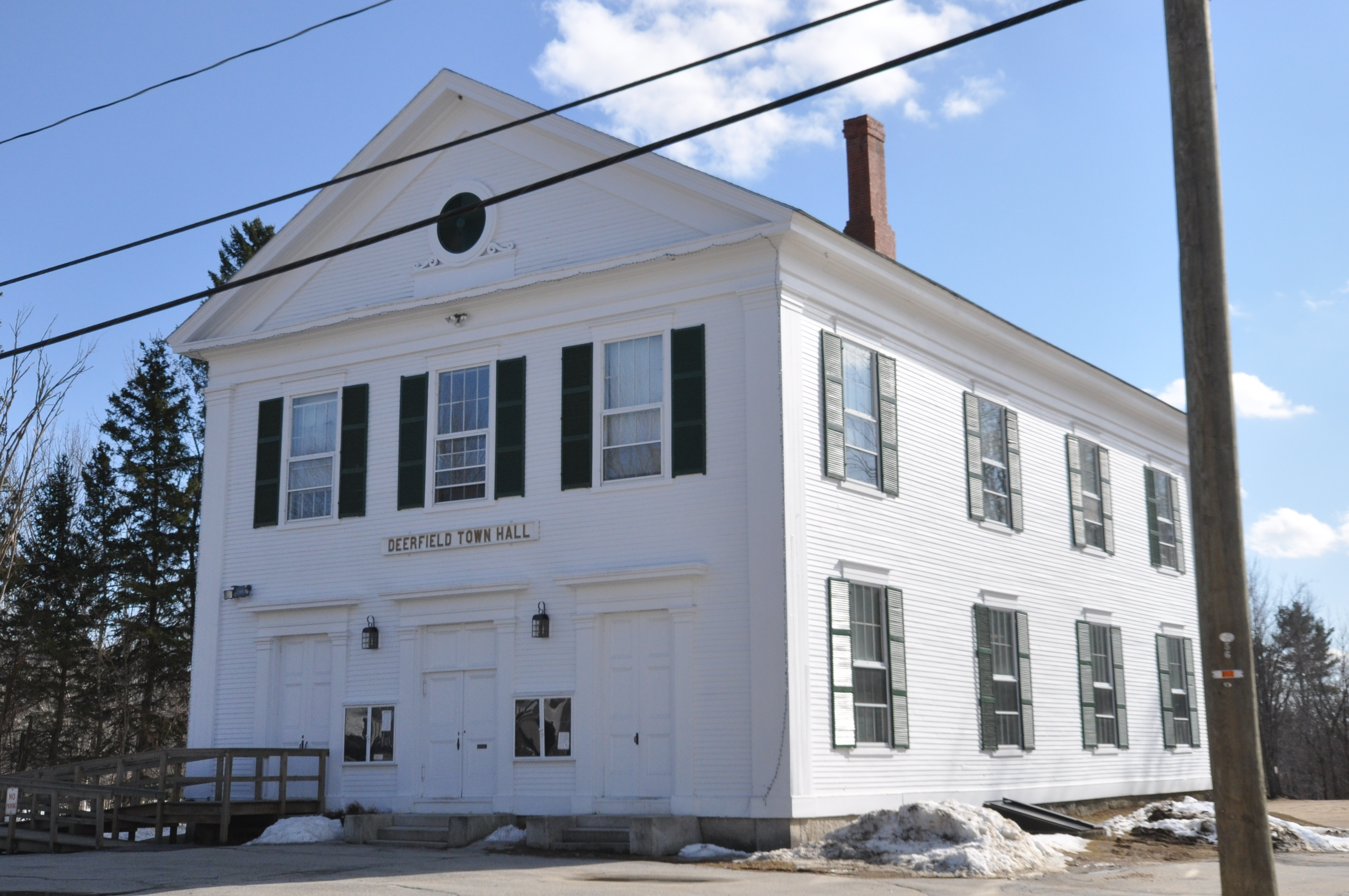

- Location within New Hampshire Location within the United States
- Location: Church St., Deerfield, New Hampshire
- Coordinates: 43°7′59″N 71°14′37″W
- Area: 1 acre (0.40 ha)
- Built: 1856
- Built by: Peter O. Woodman
- Architect: Foster & Robinson
- Architectural style: Greek Revival
- NRHP reference No.: 80000307
- Added to NRHP: April 17, 1980

The Deerfield Town House (or Deerfield Town Hall) is the town hall of Deerfield, New Hampshire. Built in 1856, it is one of the state's finest examples of public Greek Revival architecture. The building was listed on the National Register of Historic Places in 1980, as "Town House".

== Description and history ==
The Deerfield Town House is located on Church Street (formerly Old Centre Road), just west of its junction with New Hampshire Route 107. It is a 2 1/2-story wood-frame structure, with a granite foundation, gabled roof and clapboarded exterior. Its corners have pilasters rising to full entablature, and the gable end is fully pedimented, with a small oculus window. There are three doors on the main facade, each flanked by Doric pilasters and topped by an entablature. Above each doorway is a sash window. Similar sash windows line the sides, with lintels that have slightly projecting cornices. The front of its lower hall has been divided to provide office space for the town and a kitchen, but has retained its original pine flooring, and there are builtin benches lining the side walls. The upper hall floor has been resurfaced in hardwood, and it has a stage with proscenium arch at the rear, which are of uncertain date.

The town hall was built in 1856 to a design by Foster & Robinson of Concord. The builder was local contractor Peter O. Woodman. It is one of the state's finest examples of public Greek Revival architecture, retaining virtually all of its original features. The interior dividers on the ground floor are an easily removable later alteration.

== See also ==
- National Register of Historic Places listings in Rockingham County, New Hampshire
