= Bedford Town Hall =

- U.S. National Register of Historic Places
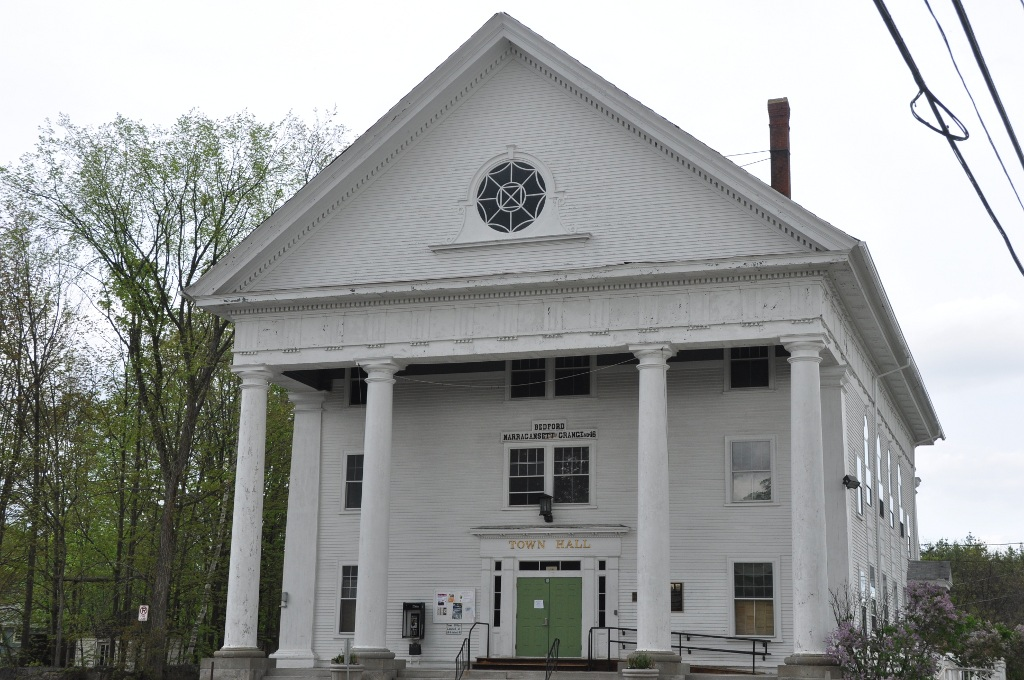

- Location within New Hampshire Location within the United States
- Location: 70 Bedford Center Rd., Bedford, New Hampshire
- Coordinates: 42°56′47″N 71°30′57″W
- Area: less than one acre
- Built: 1909
- Built by: L. B. Lodge
- Architect: Chase R. Whitcher
- Architectural style: Greek Revival
- NRHP reference No.: 84000530
- Added to NRHP: December 13, 1984

The Bedford Town Hall is located at 70 Bedford Center Road in Bedford, New Hampshire. Built in 1910, it is a prominent early work of Chase R. Whitcher, a noted architect of northern New England in the early 20th century. The building is the third town hall to stand on this site, and was listed on the National Register of Historic Places in 1984.

== Description and history ==
Bedford Town Hall is located among a cluster of civic buildings at the junction of Bedford Center and Meetinghouse roads. It is a 2½ story wood-frame structure, with a gabled roof and clapboarded exterior. It seems to be Greek Revival in form, with a classical four-column temple front, but the proportions of the columns are out of scale with typical 19th century examples of the style, and there are other details (such as the oculus window in the gable) that borrow from other 19th-century styles. The columns support an entablature and gabled pediment, with the entablature extending along the sides of the building. The building corners have broad pilasters. The main entrance is at the center, flanked by sidelight windows set between pilasters, and topped by a transom window and corniced entablature.

The site on which the town hall stands was the site of Bedford's first colonial meeting house, built in 1755. That building, originally built to house civic and religious functions, was used exclusively for civic functions from 1832 until 1876, when a new town hall was built on the site. That building was destroyed by fire in 1909. The present building was designed by Chase R. Whitcher, a native of Lisbon, New Hampshire, who studied architecture at the Massachusetts Institute of Technology. Whitcher was then early in what would be a successful career, and this building is a relatively unusual example of his work. His use of Classical Revival features is not typically found on his later works, which include buildings in Manchester, and a wing of the Balsams Grand Resort Hotel in Dixville Notch.

== See also ==
- National Register of Historic Places listings in Hillsborough County, New Hampshire
