= Joseph Boucher de Niverville =

18th-century military figure in Quebec

- Born: September 22, 1715; Chambly, Quebec
- Died: August 30, 1804 (aged 88); Trois-Rivières, Quebec
- Other name: Joseph-Claude Boucher de Niverville
- Spouse: Marie-Josephte Châtelin (m. 1757)
- Children: 11
- Military career
- Allegiance: Kingdom of France (1734–1763); Great Britain (1763–1798)
- Service years: 1734–1798
- Rank: Ensign
- Conflicts: King George's War (1744–1748); Siege of Fort at Number 4 (1747); French and Indian War (1754–1763); Battle of Carillon (1758); Battle of Sainte-Foy (1760); Invasion of Quebec (1775–1776); Battle of Trois-Rivières (1776)
- Awards: Order of Saint Louis (1763)

Joseph Boucher de Niverville (September 22, 1715 – August 30, 1804) was an army and militia officer in New France (under the rule of the Kingdom of France) and the Province of Quebec (under the rule of Great Britain) of present-day Canada. He was made a Chevalier of the Order of Saint Louis and his military career was "one of the longest of any Canadian officer in the 18th century."

In 1751 Niverville was ordered to establish a new trading post west of Fort Paskoya (Le Pas) to serve as a base for an expedition west towards the Rockies. He dispatched two canoes with ten men from Fort Paskoya but he himself became ill and could join them as he had intended. His men built Fort La Jonquière (probably in the vicinity of Nipawin, SK) and possibly even went far enough west to sight the Rockies.

In 1759, Marie, a Cree woman enslaved by Boucher de Niverville, injured his wife, Marie-Josephte Chastelain, and his mother, Marguerite, with a knife. In December of that year Marie was executed by hanging.
