= Waverley Magazine =

Waverley Magazine April 26, 1856, readable pdf

The Waverley Magazine and Literary Repository (1850–1908) , also known as Waverley Magazine and Illustrated Waverley Magazine, was a periodical for women in the United States. It included stories, poetry, and music. It was published in Boston.

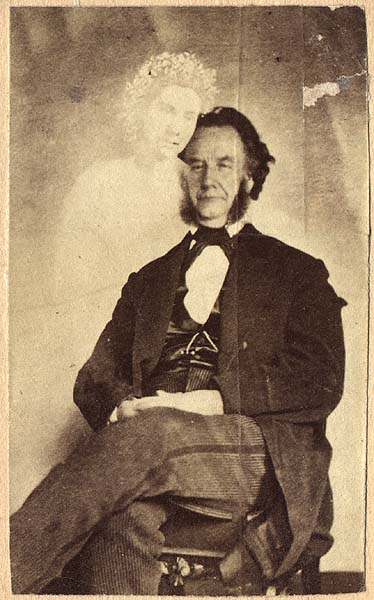
Moses A. Dow in a "spirit photograph" by William H. Mumler

Moses Arnold Dow (May 20, 1810–1886) was its founder, editor, and publisher. Dow was a native of Littleton. He worked at Sylvester T. Goss' printing business.

He founded and equipped Dow Academy in Franconia, New Hampshire. He built a monument to his father and mother, Joseph Emerson Dow and Abigail Arnold Dow, at a Franconia cemetery. He wrote about his experiences with spiritualism.

Waverley Magazine was billed as the largest paper in the world and was a weekly. State senator and public official Gen. Moses Dow was his grandfather.

His daughter Mary Elizabeth Dow married George Robert White Scott. She wrote a book about her husband.
