= New Hampshire =

U.S. state

- State
- Flag Seal
- Nicknames: Granite State; White Mountain State
- Motto: "Live Free or Die"
- Anthem: "Old New Hampshire"
- Location of New Hampshire within the United States
- Country: United States
- Before statehood: Province of New Hampshire
- Admitted to the Union: June 21, 1788 (9th)
- Capital: Concord
- Largest city: Manchester
- Largest county or equivalent: Hillsborough
- Largest metro and urban areas: Greater Boston (combined and metro); Nashua (urban)

Government
  - Governor: Kelly Ayotte (R)
  - Senate President: Sharon Carson (R) (Note: In the event of a vacancy in the office of governor, the president of the State Senate is first in line to assume the gubernatorial powers and duties as acting governor.)
- Legislature: General Court
  - Upper house: Senate
  - Lower house: House of Representatives
- Judiciary: New Hampshire Supreme Court
- U.S. senators: Jeanne Shaheen (D); Maggie Hassan (D)
- U.S. House delegation: 1: Chris Pappas (D); 2: Maggie Goodlander (D) (list)

Area
  - Total: 9,350 sq mi (24,216 km^{2})
  - Land: 8,950 sq mi (23,190 km^{2})
  - Water: 396 sq mi (1,026 km^{2}) 4.2%
  - Rank: 46th

Dimensions
  - Length: 190 mi (305 km)
  - Width: 68 mi (110 km)
- Elevation: 980 ft (300 m)
- Highest elevation (Mount Washington (Note: Elevation adjusted to North American Vertical Datum of 1988) (Note: The summit of Mount Washington is the highest point in northeastern North America.)): 6,288.3 ft (1,916.66 m)
- Lowest elevation (Atlantic Ocean): 0 ft (0 m)

Population (2025)
  - Total: 1,415,342 ▲
  - Rank: 41st
  - Density: 158.1/sq mi (61.03/km^{2})
  - Rank: 21st
  - Median household income: $96,800 (2023)
  - Income rank: 4th
- Demonyms: New Hampshirite; Granite Stater

Language
  - Official language: English (French allowed for official business with Quebec; other languages allowed for certain specific uses)
- Time zone: UTC−05:00 (Eastern)
  - Summer (DST): UTC−04:00 (EDT)
- USPS abbreviation: NH
- ISO 3166 code: US-NH
- Traditional abbreviation: N.H.
- Latitude: 42° 42′ N to 45° 18′ N
- Longitude: 70° 36′ W to 72° 33′ W
- Website: nh.gov

State symbols of New Hampshire
List of state symbols
- Flag of New Hampshire

- Seal of New Hampshire

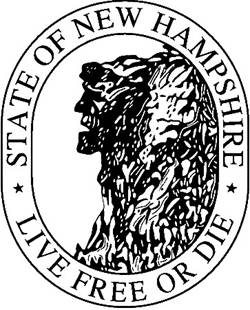
- Emblem of New Hampshire

Living insignia
- Amphibian: Red-spotted newt Notophthalmus viridescens
- Bird: Purple finch Haemorhous purpureus
- Butterfly: Karner Blue; Lycaeides melissa samuelis
- Dog breed: Chinook
- Fish: Freshwater: Brook trout Salvelinus fontinalis Saltwater: Striped bass Morone saxatilis
- Flower: Purple lilac Syringa vulgaris
- Insect: Ladybug; Coccinellidae
- Mammal: White-tailed deer Odocoileus virginianus
- Tree: White birch Betula papyrifera

Inanimate insignia
- Food: Fruit: Pumpkin; Vegetable: White Potato; Berry: Blackberry
- Gemstone: Smoky quartz
- Mineral: Beryl
- Rock: Granite
- Sport: Skiing
- Tartan: New Hampshire state tartan

State route marker

State quarter
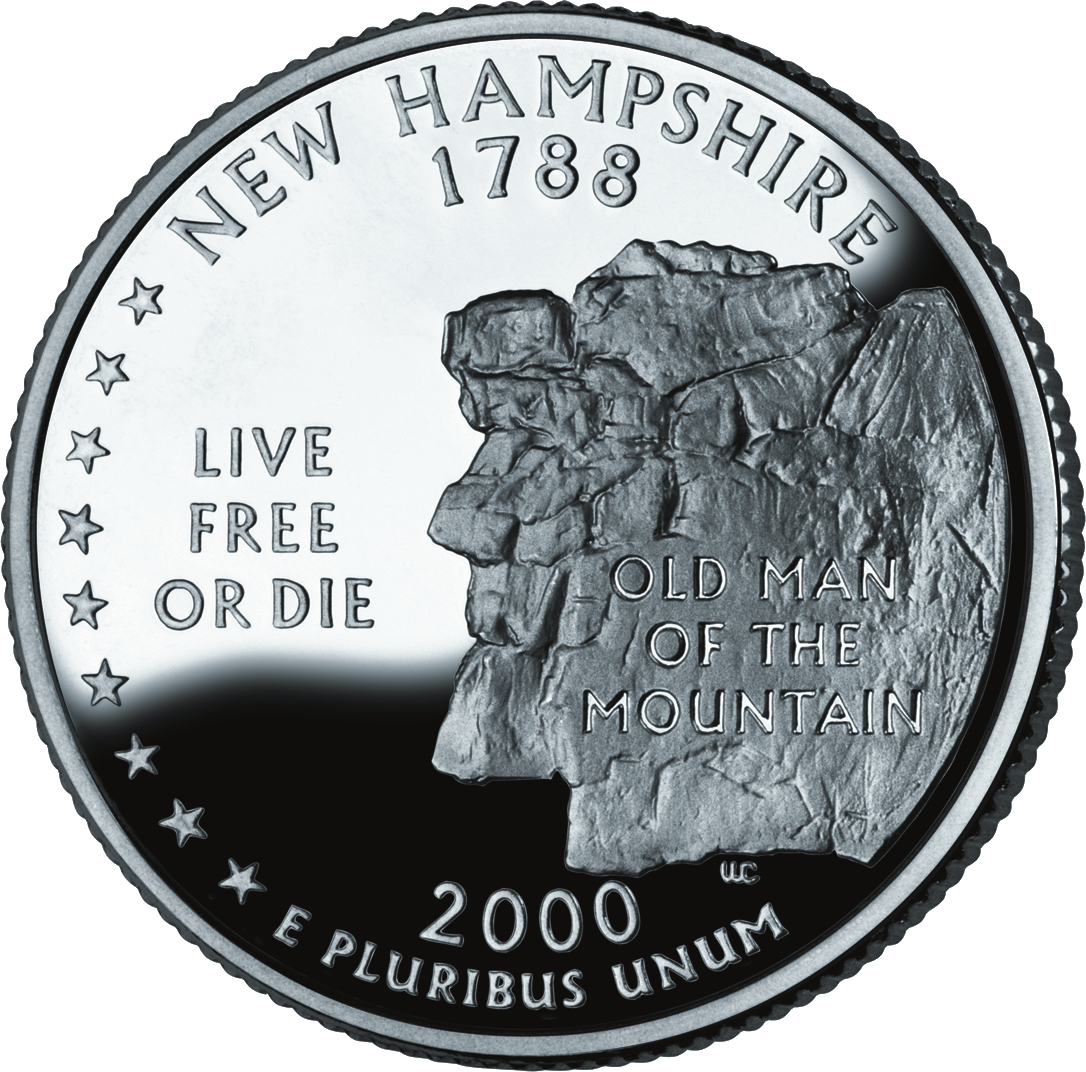
- Released in 2000

New Hampshire (/ˈhæmpʃər/ HAMP-shər) is a state in the New England region of the Northeastern United States. It borders Massachusetts to the south, Vermont to the west, Maine and the Gulf of Maine to the east, and the Canadian province of Quebec to the north. Of the 50 U.S. states, New Hampshire is the seventh-smallest by land area and the tenth-least populous, with a population of 1,377,529 residents as of the 2020 census. Concord is the state capital and Manchester is the most populous city. New Hampshire's motto, "Live Free or Die", reflects its role in the American Revolutionary War; its nickname, "The Granite State", refers to its extensive granite formations and quarries. It is well known for holding the first primary in the U.S. presidential election cycle, and its resulting influence on American electoral politics.

New Hampshire was inhabited for thousands of years by Algonquian-speaking peoples such as the Abenaki. Europeans arrived in the 17th century, with the English establishing some of the earliest non-indigenous settlements. The Province of New Hampshire was established in 1629, named after the English county of Hampshire. Up to the time of the French and Indian War, New Hampshire was on the frontier of British territory and saw action against the French and their indigenous allies. Following tensions between the British colonies and the Crown in the 1760s, New Hampshire saw one of the earliest acts of rebellion, with the seizure of Fort William and Mary from the British in 1774. In 1776, it became the first of the British North American colonies to establish an independent government and state constitution. Its delegates signed the United States Declaration of Independence and contributed troops, ships, and supplies in the war against Britain. In 1788, it was the ninth state to ratify the U.S. Constitution, bringing it into effect. Through the mid-19th century, New Hampshire was an active center of abolitionism, and fielded close to 32,000 Union soldiers during the U.S. Civil War. Afterwards the state saw rapid industrialization and population growth, becoming a center of textile manufacturing, shoemaking, and papermaking; the Amoskeag Manufacturing Company in Manchester was the largest cotton textile plant in the world. French Canadians formed the most significant influx of immigrants, and a quarter of New Hampshire residents have French American ancestry.

Reflecting a nationwide trend, New Hampshire's industrial sector declined after World War II. Since 1950, its economy has diversified to include financial services, real estate, education, transportation and high-tech, with manufacturing still higher than the US average. Its population surged as highways connected it to Greater Boston and led to more commuter towns. New Hampshire is among the wealthiest and most-educated states, tying Massachusetts for the highest Human Development in the nation. It is one of nine states without an income tax and has no taxes on sales, capital gains, or inheritance while relying heavily on local property taxes to fund education; consequently, its state tax burden is among the lowest in the country. This lack of broad-based taxes has been promoted as the "New Hampshire Advantage," a phrase coined by former governor Stephen Merrill to describe the state's philosophy of low taxes and local control. The state's politics are often described as libertarian-leaning, combining fiscal conservatism with cultural liberalism. The Republican Party has dominated state-level government since 2021, while the Democratic Party has all four federal seats.

With its mountainous and heavily forested terrain, New Hampshire has a growing tourism sector centered on recreation. It has some of the highest ski mountains on the East Coast and is a major destination for winter sports, and Mount Monadnock is among the most climbed mountains in the world. Other activities include observing the fall foliage, summer cottages along lakes and the seacoast, motorsports at the New Hampshire Motor Speedway in Loudon, and Motorcycle Week, a motorcycle rally held in Weirs Beach in Laconia. The White Mountain National Forest includes most of the Appalachian Trail between Vermont and Maine, and has the Mount Washington Auto Road, where visitors may drive to the top of 6,288-foot (1,917 m) Mount Washington.

== History ==
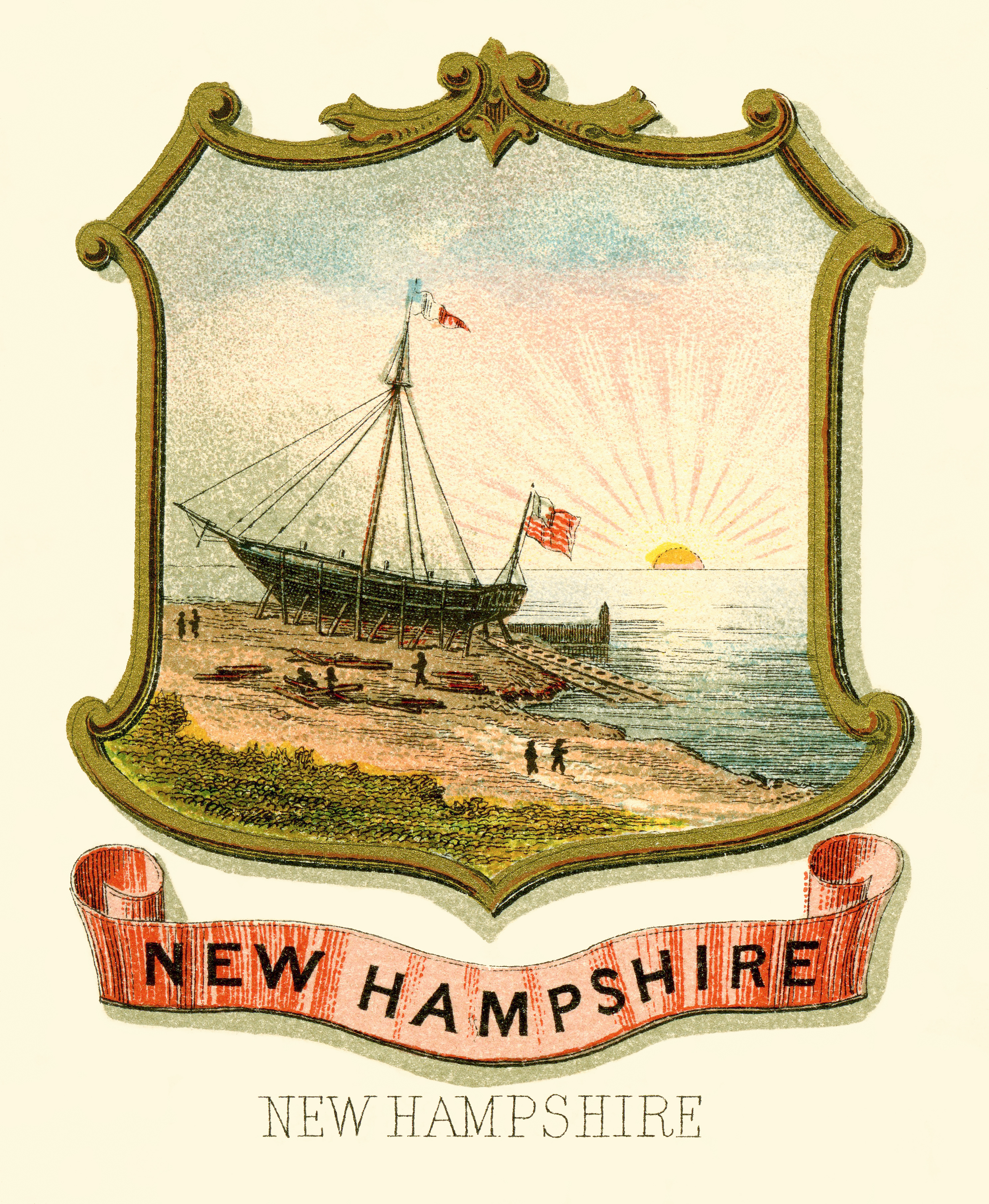
The historical coat of arms of New Hampshire, from 1876

Various Algonquian-speaking Abenaki tribes, largely divided between the Androscoggin, Cowasuck and Pennacook nations, inhabited the area before European colonization. Despite the similar language, they had a very different culture and religion from other Algonquian peoples. Indigenous people lived near Keene, New Hampshire 12,000 years ago, according to 2009 archaeological digs, and the Abenaki were present in New Hampshire in pre-colonial times.

English and French explorers visited New Hampshire in 1600–1605, and David Thompson settled at Odiorne's Point in present-day Rye in 1623. The first permanent European settlement was at Hilton's Point (present-day Dover). By 1631, the Upper Plantation comprised modern-day Dover, Durham and Stratham. After several years of petitions from Robert Tufton Mason, it became the "Royal Province" in 1679, the first royal province in New England. Southern New Hampshire was on the front lines during King William's War during which both Dover and Durham were burned in 1689 and 1692, respectively. Dummer's War was fought between the colonists and the Wabanaki Confederacy throughout New Hampshire.

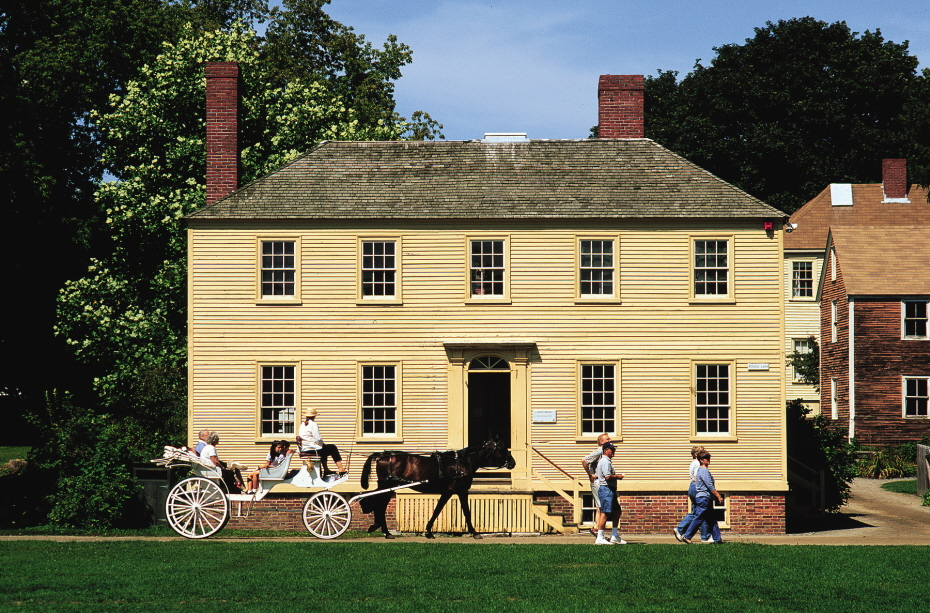
The Strawbery Banke Museum in Portsmouth includes 37 restored buildings dating from the 17th through 19th centuries.

New Hampshire was one of the Thirteen Colonies that rebelled against British rule during the American Revolution. During the American Revolution, New Hampshire was economically divided. The Seacoast region revolved around sawmills, shipyards, merchants' warehouses, and established village and town centers, where wealthy merchants built substantial homes, furnished them with luxuries, and invested their capital in trade and land speculation. At the other end of the social scale, there developed a permanent class of day laborers, mariners, indentured servants and slaves.

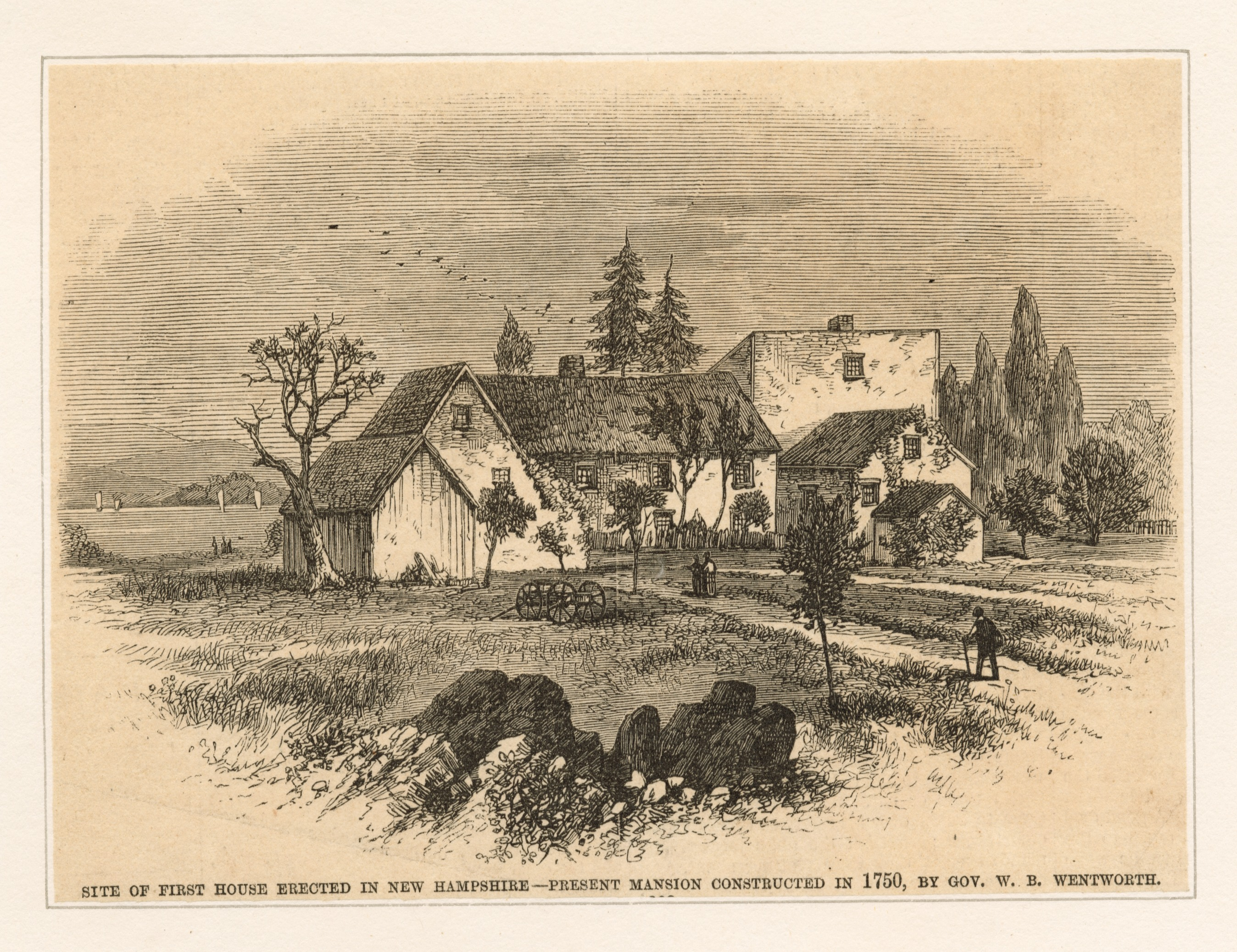
Illustration showing the site of the first house in New Hampshire; present-day location of the Wentworth–Coolidge Mansion

In December 1774, Paul Revere warned Patriots that Fort William and Mary would be reinforced with British troops. The following day, John Sullivan raided the fort for weapons. During the raid, the British soldiers fired at rebels with cannon and muskets, but there were apparently no casualties. These were among the first shots in the American Revolutionary period, occurring approximately five months before the Battles of Lexington and Concord. On January 5, 1776, New Hampshire became the first colony to declare independence from Great Britain, almost six months before the Declaration of Independence was signed by the Continental Congress.

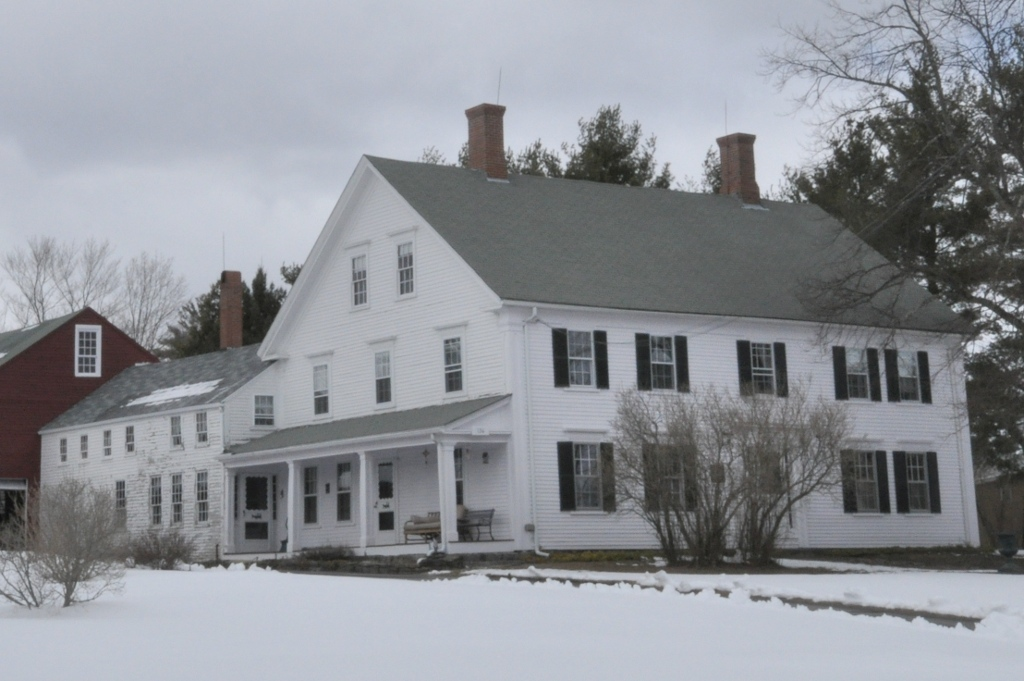
Josiah Bartlett, signer of the Declaration of Independence and the Articles of Confederation, was the first governor of New Hampshire. His house in Kingston, New Hampshire still stands.

The United States Constitution was ratified by New Hampshire on June 21, 1788; the state was the ninth to do so and thus brought the Constitution into effect.

New Hampshire was a Jacksonian stronghold; the state sent Franklin Pierce to the White House in the election of 1852. Industrialization took the form of numerous textile mills, which in turn attracted large flows of immigrants from Quebec (the "French Canadians") and Ireland. The northern parts of the state produced lumber, and the mountains provided tourist attractions. After 1960, the textile industry collapsed, but the economy rebounded as a center of high technology and as a service provider.

Starting in 1952, New Hampshire gained national and international attention for its presidential primary held early in every presidential election year. It immediately became an important testing ground for candidates for the Republican and Democratic nominations but did not necessarily guarantee victory. The media gave New Hampshire and Iowa significant attention compared to other states in the primary process, magnifying the state's decision powers and spurring repeated efforts by out-of-state politicians to change the rules.

== Geography ==
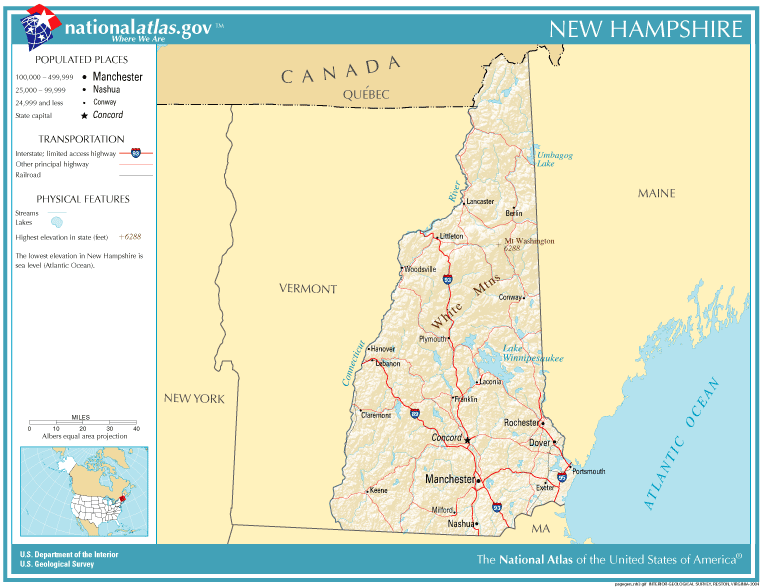
Map of New Hampshire, with roads, rivers, and major cities

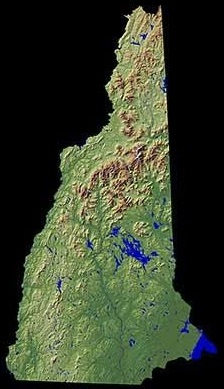
Shaded relief map of New Hampshire

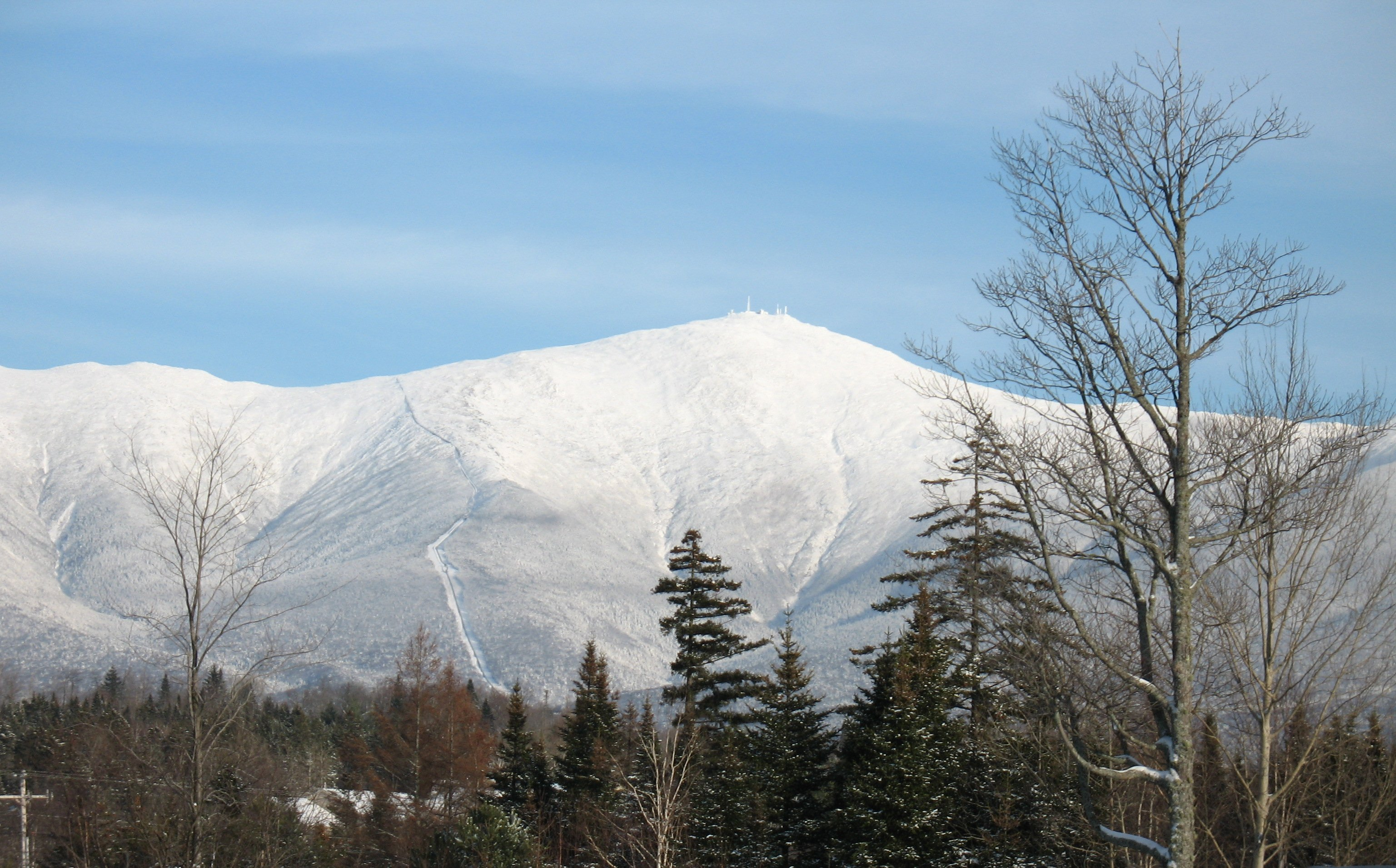
Mount Washington, part of the Presidential Range. The highest point in the northeastern United States, it holds the record for the fastest wind speed ever recorded by a staffed weather station – 231 miles (372 km) per hour.

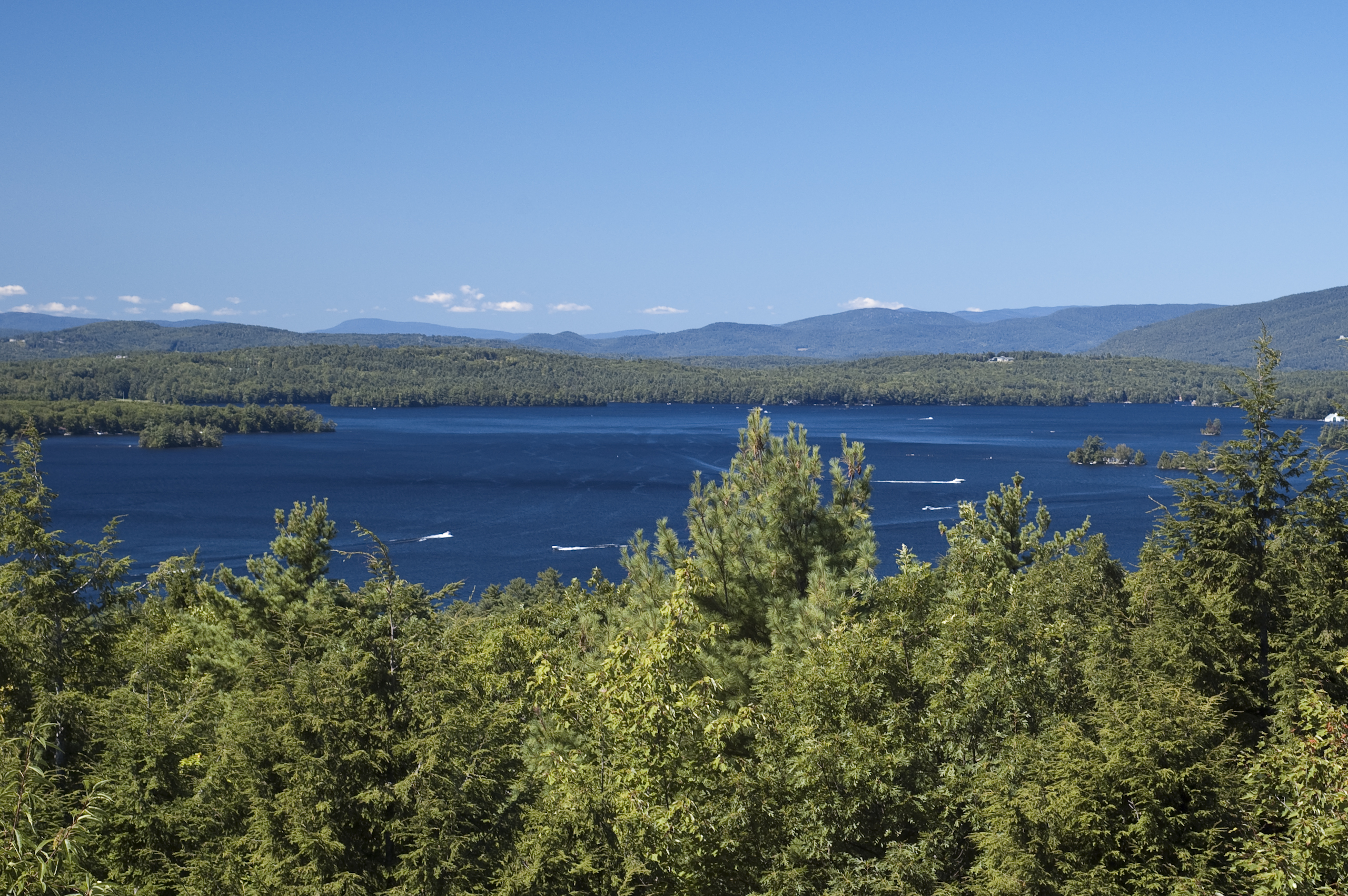
Lake Winnipesaukee and the Ossipee Mountains

New Hampshire is part of the six-state New England region of the Northeastern United States. It is bounded by Quebec, Canada, to the north and northwest; Maine and the Gulf of Maine to the east; Massachusetts to the south; and Vermont to the west. New Hampshire's major regions are the Great North Woods, the White Mountains, the Lakes Region, the Seacoast, the Merrimack Valley, the Monadnock Region, and the Dartmouth-Lake Sunapee area. New Hampshire has the shortest ocean coastline of any U.S. coastal state, with a length of 18 miles (29 km), sometimes measured as only 13 miles (21 km).

The White Mountains range in New Hampshire spans the north-central portion of the state. The range includes Mount Washington, the tallest in the northeastern U.S.—site of the second-highest wind speed ever recorded— as well as Mount Adams and Mount Jefferson. With hurricane-force winds every third day on average, more than a hundred recorded deaths among visitors, and conspicuous krumholtz (dwarf, matted trees much like a carpet of bonsai trees), the climate on the upper reaches of Mount Washington has inspired the weather observatory on the peak to claim that the area has the "World's Worst Weather". The White Mountains were home to the rock formation called the Old Man of the Mountain, a face-like profile in Franconia Notch, until the formation disintegrated in May 2003. Even after its loss, the Old Man remains an enduring symbol for the state, seen on state highway signs, automobile license plates, and many government and private entities around New Hampshire.

In southwestern New Hampshire, the landmark Mount Monadnock has given its name to a class of earth-forms—a monadnock—signifying, in geomorphology, any isolated resistant peak rising from a less resistant eroded plain.

New Hampshire has more than 800 lakes and ponds, and approximately 19,000 miles (31,000 km) of rivers and streams. Major rivers include the 110-mile (177 km) Merrimack River, which bisects the lower half of the state north–south before passing into Massachusetts and reaching the sea in Newburyport. Its tributaries include the Contoocook River, Pemigewasset River, and Winnipesaukee River. The 410-mile (660 km) Connecticut River, which starts at New Hampshire's Connecticut Lakes and flows south to Connecticut, defines the western border with Vermont. The state border is not in the center of that river, as is usually the case, but at the low-water mark on the Vermont side, meaning the entire river along the Vermont border (save for areas where the water level has been raised by a dam) lies within New Hampshire. Only one town—Pittsburg—shares a land border with the state of Vermont. The "northwesternmost headwaters" of the Connecticut River also define part of the Canada–U.S. border.

The Piscataqua River and its several tributaries form the state's only significant ocean port where they flow into the Atlantic at Portsmouth. The Salmon Falls River and the Piscataqua define the southern portion of the border with Maine. The Piscataqua River boundary was the subject of a border dispute between New Hampshire and Maine in 2001, with New Hampshire claiming dominion over several islands (primarily Seavey's Island) that include the Portsmouth Naval Shipyard. The U.S. Supreme Court dismissed the case in 2002, leaving ownership of the island with Maine. New Hampshire still claims sovereignty of the base, however.

The largest of New Hampshire's lakes is Lake Winnipesaukee, which covers 71 square miles (184 km^{2}) in the east-central part of New Hampshire. Umbagog Lake along the Maine border, approximately 12.3 square miles (31.9 km^{2}), is a distant second. Squam Lake is the second-largest lake entirely in New Hampshire.

New Hampshire has the shortest ocean coastline of any state in the United States, approximately 18 miles (29 km) long. Hampton Beach is a popular local summer destination. About 7 miles (11 km) offshore are the Isles of Shoals, nine small islands (four of which are in New Hampshire) known as the site of a 19th-century art colony founded by poet Celia Thaxter, and the alleged location of one of the buried treasures of the pirate Blackbeard.

It is the state with the highest percentage of timberland area in the country. New Hampshire is in the temperate broadleaf and mixed forests biome. Much of the state, in particular the White Mountains, is covered by the conifers and northern hardwoods of the New England-Acadian forests. The southeast corner of the state and parts of the Connecticut River along the Vermont border are covered by the mixed oaks of the Northeastern coastal forests. The state's numerous forests are popular among autumnal leaf peepers seeking the brilliant foliage of the numerous deciduous trees.

The northern third of the state is locally referred to as the "north country" or "north of the notches", in reference to the White Mountain passes that channel traffic. It contains less than 5% of the state's population, suffers relatively high poverty, and is steadily losing population as the logging and paper industries decline. However, the tourist industry, in particular visitors who go to northern New Hampshire to ski, snowboard, hike and mountain bike, has helped offset economic losses from mill closures.

Environmental protection emerged as a key state issue in the early 1900s in response to poor logging practices. In the 1970s, activists defeated a proposal to build an oil refinery along the coast and limited plans for a full-width interstate highway through Franconia Notch to a parkway.

Winter season lengths are projected to decline at ski areas across New Hampshire due to the effects of climate change, which is likely to continue the historic contraction and consolidation of the ski industry and threaten individual ski businesses and communities that rely on ski tourism.

=== Flora and fauna ===
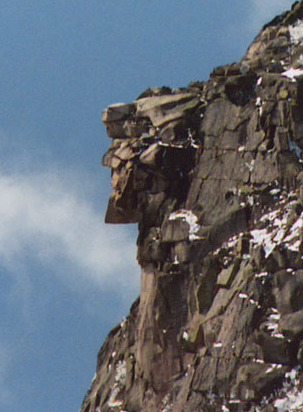
The Old Man of the Mountain, a rock formation that became a symbol of New Hampshire. It fell in 2003, but is still used on state license plates, route markers, and the State Quarter.

Black bears, white-tailed deer, and moose can be found all over New Hampshire. There are also less-common animals such as the marten and the Canadian lynx.

=== Climate ===
New Hampshire experiences a humid continental climate (Köppen climate classification Dfa in some southern areas, Dfb in most of the state, and Dfc subarctic in some northern highland areas), with warm, humid summers, and long, cold, and snowy winters. Precipitation is fairly evenly distributed all year. The climate of the southeastern portion is moderated by the Atlantic Ocean and averages relatively milder winters (for New Hampshire), while the northern and interior portions experience colder temperatures and lower humidity. Winters are cold and snowy throughout the state, and especially severe in the northern and mountainous areas. Average annual snowfall ranges from 60 inches (150 cm) to over 100 inches (250 cm) across the state.

Average daytime highs are in the mid 70s°F to low 80s°F (24–28 °C) throughout the state in July, with overnight lows in the mid 50s°F to low 60s°F (13–15 °C). January temperatures range from an average high of 34 °F (1 °C) on the coast to overnight lows below 0 °F (−18 °C) in the far north and at high elevations. Average annual precipitation statewide is roughly 40 inches (100 cm) with some variation occurring in the White Mountains due to differences in elevation and annual snowfall. New Hampshire's highest recorded temperature was 106 °F (41 °C) in Nashua on July 4, 1911, while the lowest recorded temperature was −47 °F (−44 °C) atop Mount Washington on January 29, 1934. Mount Washington also saw an unofficial −50 °F (−46 °C) reading on January 22, 1885, which, if made official, would tie the record low for New England (also −50 °F (−46 °C) at Big Black River, Maine, on January 16, 2009, and Bloomfield, Vermont on December 30, 1933).

Extreme snow is often associated with a nor'easter, such as the Blizzard of '78 and the Blizzard of 1993, when several feet accumulated across portions of the state over 24 to 48 hours. Lighter snowfalls of several inches occur frequently throughout winter, often associated with an Alberta Clipper.

New Hampshire, on occasion, is affected by hurricanes and tropical storms—although, by the time they reach the state, they are often extratropical—with most storms striking the southern New England coastline and moving inland or passing by offshore in the Gulf of Maine. Most of New Hampshire averages fewer than 20 days of thunderstorms per year and an average of two tornadoes occur annually statewide.

The National Arbor Day Foundation plant hardiness zone map depicts zones 3, 4, 5, and 6 occurring throughout the state and indicates the transition from a relatively cooler to warmer climate as one travels southward across New Hampshire. The 1990 USDA plant hardiness zones for New Hampshire range from zone 3b in the north to zone 5b in the south.

Average daily maximum and minimum temperatures for selected cities in New Hampshire
| Location | July (°F) | July (°C) | January (°F) | January (°C) |
|---|---|---|---|---|
| Manchester | 82/64 | 28/17 | 33/15 | 0/−9 |
| Nashua | 82/59 | 28/15 | 33/12 | 0/−11 |
| Concord | 82/57 | 28/14 | 30/10 | −1/−12 |
| Portsmouth | 79/61 | 26/16 | 32/16 | 0/−9 |
| Keene | 82/56 | 28/13 | 31/9 | −1/−12 |
| Laconia | 81/60 | 27/16 | 30/11 | −1/−11 |
| Lebanon | 82/58 | 28/14 | 30/8 | −1/−13 |
| Berlin | 78/55 | 26/13 | 27/5 | –3/–15 |

=== Metropolitan areas ===
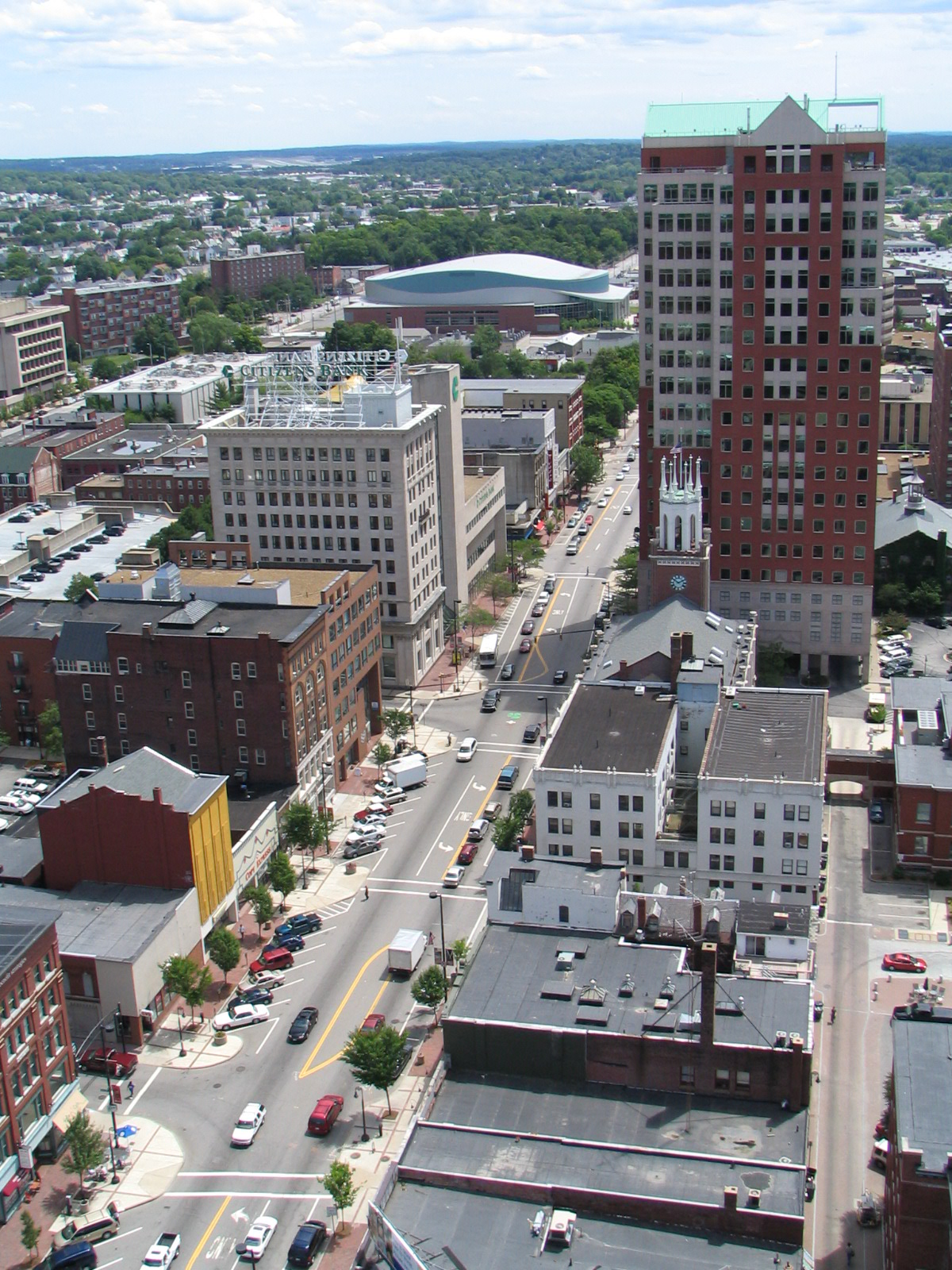
Downtown Manchester

Metropolitan areas in the New England region are defined by the U.S. Census Bureau as New England City and Town Areas (NECTAs). The following is a list of NECTAs fully or partially in New Hampshire:

- Berlin
- Boston–Cambridge–Nashua
  - Haverhill–Newburyport–Amesbury Town NECTA Division
  - Lawrence–Methuen Town–Salem NECTA Division
  - Lowell–Billerica–Chelmsford NECTA Division
  - Nashua NECTA Division
- Claremont
- Concord
- Dover–Durham
- Franklin
- Keene
- Laconia
- Lebanon
- Manchester
- Portsmouth

== Demographics ==
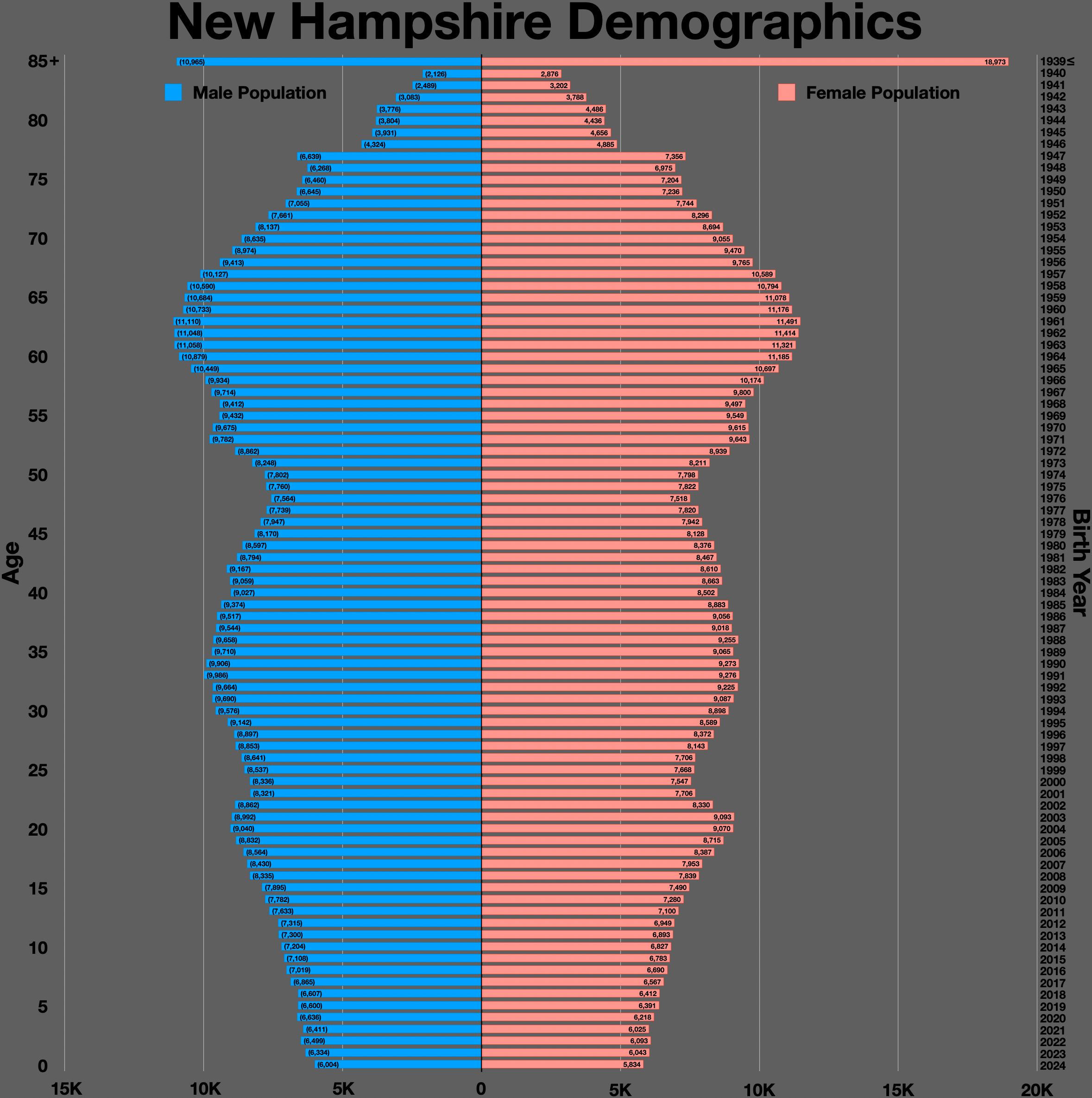
New Hampshire population pyramid

Historical population
| Census | Pop. | Note | %± |
|---|---|---|---|
| 1790 | 141,885 | | — |
| 1800 | 183,858 | | 29.6% |
| 1810 | 214,460 | | 16.6% |
| 1820 | 244,155 | | 13.8% |
| 1830 | 269,328 | | 10.3% |
| 1840 | 284,574 | | 5.7% |
| 1850 | 317,976 | | 11.7% |
| 1860 | 326,073 | | 2.5% |
| 1870 | 318,300 | | −2.4% |
| 1880 | 346,991 | | 9.0% |
| 1890 | 376,530 | | 8.5% |
| 1900 | 411,588 | | 9.3% |
| 1910 | 430,572 | | 4.6% |
| 1920 | 443,083 | | 2.9% |
| 1930 | 465,293 | | 5.0% |
| 1940 | 491,524 | | 5.6% |
| 1950 | 533,242 | | 8.5% |
| 1960 | 606,921 | | 13.8% |
| 1970 | 737,681 | | 21.5% |
| 1980 | 920,610 | | 24.8% |
| 1990 | 1,109,252 | | 20.5% |
| 2000 | 1,235,786 | | 11.4% |
| 2010 | 1,316,470 | | 6.5% |
| 2020 | 1,377,529 | | 4.6% |
| 2025 (est.) | 1,415,342 | | 2.7% |
Source: 1910–2020

=== Population ===
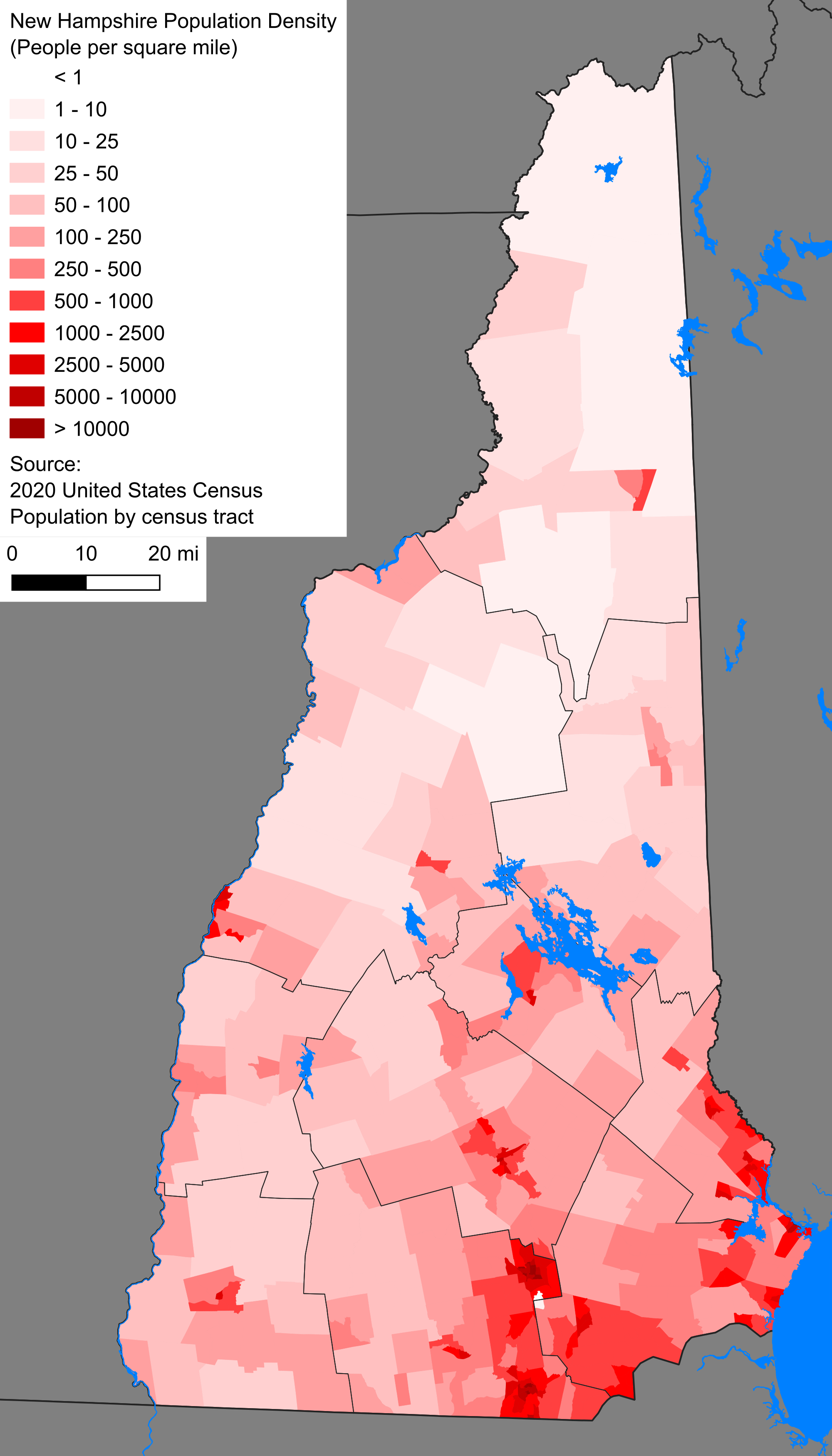
Population density by census tract

As of the 2020 census, the resident population of New Hampshire was 1,377,529, a 4.6% increase since the 2010 United States census. The center of population of New Hampshire is in Merrimack County, in the town of Pembroke. The center of population has moved south 12 miles (19 km) since 1950, a reflection of the fact that the state's fastest growth has been along its southern border, which is within commuting range of Boston and other Massachusetts cities.

As indicated in the census, in 2020 88.3% of the population were White; 1.5% were Black or African American; 0.2% were Native American or Alaskan Native; 2.6% were Asian; 0.0% were Native Hawaiian or other Pacific Islander; 1.7% were some other race; and 5.6% were two or more races. 4.3% of the total population were Hispanic or Latino of any race. 18.6% of the population were under 18 years of age; 19.3% were 65 years and over. The female population was 50.5%.

The most densely populated areas generally lie within 50 miles (80 km) of the Massachusetts border, and are concentrated in two areas: along the Merrimack River Valley running from Concord to Nashua, and in the Seacoast Region along an axis stretching from Rochester to Portsmouth. Outside of those two regions, only one community, the city of Keene, has a population of over 20,000. The four counties covering these two areas account for 72% of the state population, and one (Hillsborough) has nearly 30% of the state population, as well as the two most populous communities, Manchester and Nashua. The northern portion of the state is very sparsely populated: the largest county by area, Coos, covers the northern one-fourth of the state and has only around 31,000 people, about a third of whom live in a single community (Berlin). Over the past several decades, New Hampshire's population has shifted southward as northern communities faced economic decline while southern regions were increasingly integrated into the Greater Boston metropolitan area.

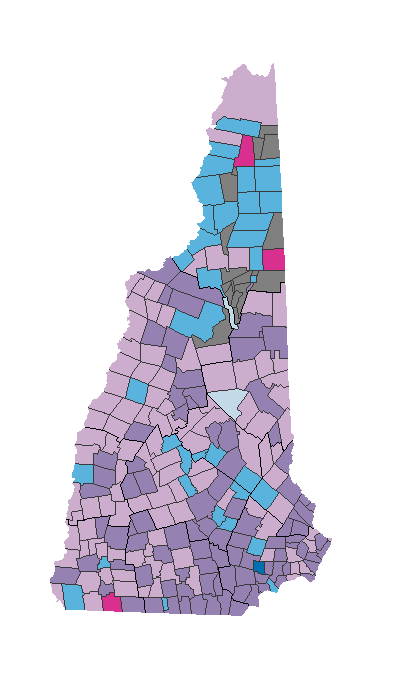
Largest reported ancestry groups in New Hampshire by town as of 2013. Dark purple indicates Irish, light purple English, pink French, turquoise French Canadian, dark blue Italian, and light blue German. Gray indicates townships with no reported data.

As of the 2010 census, the population of New Hampshire was 1,316,470. The gender makeup of the state at that time was 49.3% male and 50.7% female. 21.8% of the population were under the age of 18; 64.6% were between the ages of 18 and 64; and 13.5% were 65 years of age or older. Additionally, about 57.3% of the population was born out of state.

According to HUD's 2022 Annual Homeless Assessment Report, there were an estimated 1,605 homeless people in New Hampshire.

New Hampshire racial composition of population
| Racial composition | 1990 | 2000 | 2010 | 2020 |
|---|---|---|---|---|
| White | 98.0% | 96.0% | 93.9% | 88.3% |
| Black or African American | 0.6% | 0.7% | 1.1% | 1.5% |
| American Indian and Alaska Native | 0.2% | 0.2% | 0.2% | 0.2% |
| Asian | 0.8% | 1.3% | 2.2% | 2.6% |
| Native Hawaiian and other Pacific Islander | – | – | 0.0% | 0.0% |
| Other race | 0.3% | 0.6% | 0.9% | 1.7% |
| Two or more races | – | 1.1% | 1.6% | 5.6% |
| Hispanic or Latino (of any race) | 1.0% | 1.7% | 2.8% | 4.3% |

New Hampshire – Racial and ethnic composition Note: the US Census treats Hispanic/Latino as an ethnic category. This table excludes Latinos from the racial categories and assigns them to a separate category. Hispanics/Latinos may be of any race.
| Race / Ethnicity (NH = Non-Hispanic) | Pop 2000 | Pop 2010 | Pop 2020 | % 2000 | % 2010 | % 2020 |
|---|---|---|---|---|---|---|
| White alone (NH) | 1,175,252 | 1,215,050 | 1,200,649 | 95.10% | 92.30% | 87.16% |
| Black or African American alone (NH) | 8,354 | 13,625 | 18,655 | 0.68% | 1.03% | 1.35% |
| Native American or Alaska Native alone (NH) | 2,698 | 2,693 | 2,299 | 0.22% | 0.20% | 0.17% |
| Asian alone (NH) | 15,803 | 28,241 | 35,604 | 1.28% | 2.15% | 2.58% |
| Pacific Islander alone (NH) | 330 | 329 | 388 | 0.03% | 0.02% | 0.03% |
| Other race alone (NH) | 1,254 | 1,803 | 5,916 | 0.10% | 0.14% | 0.43% |
| Mixed race or Multiracial (NH) | 11,606 | 18,025 | 54,564 | 0.94% | 1.37% | 3.96% |
| Hispanic or Latino (any race) | 20,489 | 36,704 | 59,454 | 1.66% | 2.79% | 4.32% |
| Total | 1,235,786 | 1,316,470 | 1,377,529 | 100.00% | 100.00% | 100.00% |

Hispanic or Latino of any race were 2.8% of the population in 2010: 0.6% were of Mexican, 0.9% Puerto Rican, 0.1% Cuban, and 1.2% other Hispanic or Latino origin. As of 2020, the Hispanic or Latino population was counted as 4.3%. The Native American/Alaska Native population is listed as 0.3% in the 2020 census, but may be higher.

According to the 2012–2017 American Community Survey, the largest ancestry groups in the state were Irish (20.6%), English (16.5%), French (14.0%), Italian (10.4%), German (9.1%), French Canadian (8.9%), and American (4.8%).

New Hampshire has the highest percentage (22.9%) of residents with French/French Canadian/Acadian ancestry of any U.S. state.

In 2018, the top countries of origin for New Hampshire's immigrants were India, Canada, China, Nepal and the Dominican Republic.

According to the Census Bureau's American Community Survey estimates from 2017, 2.1% of the population aged 5 and older speak Spanish at home, while 1.8% speak French. In Coös County, 9.6% of the population speaks French at home, down from 16% in 2000. In the city of Nashua, Hillsborough County, 8.02% of the population speaks Spanish at home.

Demographics of the top five municipalities by population
| | Manchester | Nashua | Concord | Derry | Dover |
|---|---|---|---|---|---|
| Population, Census (2020) | 115,644 | 91,322 | 43,976 | 34,317 | 32,741 |
| Population, Census (2010) | 109,565 | 86,494 | 42,695 | 33,109 | 29,987 |
| Population change (April 1, 2010, to April 1, 2020) | 5.5% | 5.6% | 3.0% | 3.6% | 9.2% |
| Age and sex (2020) | | | | | |
| Persons under 5 years | 5.3% | 5.0% | 4.2% | 5.0% | 4.6% |
| Persons under 18 years | 18.7% | 19.2% | 17.2% | 20.6% | 18.1% |
| Persons 65 years and over | 14.9% | 16.7% | 19.1% | 14.2% | 16.8% |
| Female persons | 50.1% | 50.4% | 49.8% | 50.4% | 50.8% |
| Race and ethnicity (2020) | | | | | |
| White | 76.7% | 73.1% | 85.4% | 89.3% | 85.7% |
| Non-Hispanic White | 74.0% | 70.3% | 84.5% | 88.1% | 84.9% |
| Hispanic or Latino | 11.8% | 13.9% | 3.1% | 4.6% | 3.2% |
| Black or African American | 5.5% | 3.0% | 3.8% | 1.2% | 1.7% |
| American Indian and Alaska Native | 0.3% | 0.3% | 0.3% | 0.1% | 0.2% |
| Asian | 4.2% | 7.8% | 4.1% | 1.6% | 5.5% |
| Native Hawaiian and other Pacific Islander | - | - | - | - | - |
| Two or more races | 7.9% | 9.0% | 5.2% | 6.0% | 5.6% |
| Population characteristics (2017–2022) | | | | | |
| Veterans | 6,212 | 5,103 | 2,885 | 2,256 | 1,569 |
| Foreign-born persons | 14.9% | 15.8% | 8.2% | 4.8% | 5.8% |

=== Birth data ===
Note: Percentages in the table do not add up to 100, because Hispanics are counted both by their ethnicity and by their race, giving a higher overall number.

Live Births by Single Race/Ethnicity of Mother
| Race | 2013 | 2018 | 2023 | 2024 |
|---|---|---|---|---|
| White (non-hispanic) | 11,064 (89.2%) | 10,317 (86.0%) | 10,094 (84.6%) | 9,958 (84.6%) |
| Asian | 485 (3.9%) | 472 (3.9%) | 411 (3.4%) | 445 (3.8%) |
| Black | 316 (2.5%) | 241 (2.0%) | 304 (2.5%) | 260 (2.2%) |
| American Indian | 25 (0.2%) | 13 (0.1%) | 10 (0.1%) | 10 (0.1%) |
| Hispanic (any race) | 513 (4.1%) | 745 (6.2%) | 889 (7.4%) | 875 (7.4%) |
| Total New Hampshire | 12,396 (100%) | 11,995 (100%) | 11,936 (100%) | 11,770 (100%) |

- Since 2016, data for births of White Hispanic origin are not collected, but included in one Hispanic group; persons of Hispanic origin may be of any race.

In 2022, New Hampshire had the lowest teen birth rate of any state, at 4.6 births per 1,000 females ages 15 to 19 years of age.

=== Religion ===
Religion in New Hampshire according to PRRI American Values Atlas (2021)
1. Unaffiliated (40.0%)
2. Catholicism (30.0%)
3. Protestantism (23.0%)
4. Unitarian/Universalist (2.00%)
5. Jehovah's Witnesses (1.00%)
6. Judaism (2.00%)
7. Other (2.00%)

A Pew survey in 2014 showed that the religious affiliations of the people of New Hampshire was as follows: nonreligious 36%, Protestant 30%, Catholic 26%, Jehovah's Witness 2%, LDS (Mormon) 1%, and Jewish 1%.

A survey suggests people in New Hampshire and Vermont (Note: Which were polled jointly) are less likely than other Americans to attend weekly services and only 54% say they are "absolutely certain there is a God" compared to 71% in the rest of the nation. (Note: 86% in Alabama and South Carolina) New Hampshire and Vermont are also at the lowest levels among states in religious commitment. In 2012, 23% of New Hampshire residents in a Gallup poll considered themselves "very religious", while 52% considered themselves "non-religious". According to the Association of Religion Data Archives (ARDA) in 2010, the largest denominations were the Catholic Church with 311,028 members; the United Church of Christ with 26,321 members; and the United Methodist Church with 18,029 members.

In 2016, a Gallup Poll found that New Hampshire was the least religious state in the United States. Only 20% of respondents in New Hampshire categorized themselves as "very religious", while the nationwide average was 40%.

According to the 2020 Public Religion Research Institute study, 64% of the population was Christian, dominated by Roman Catholicism and evangelical Protestantism. In contrast with varying studies of estimated irreligiosity, the Public Religion Research Institute reported that irreligion declined from 36% at the separate 2014 Pew survey to 25% of the population in 2020. In 2021, the unaffiliated increased to 40% of the population, although Christianity altogether made up 54% of the total population (Catholics, Protestants, and Jehovah's Witnesses).

== Economy ==
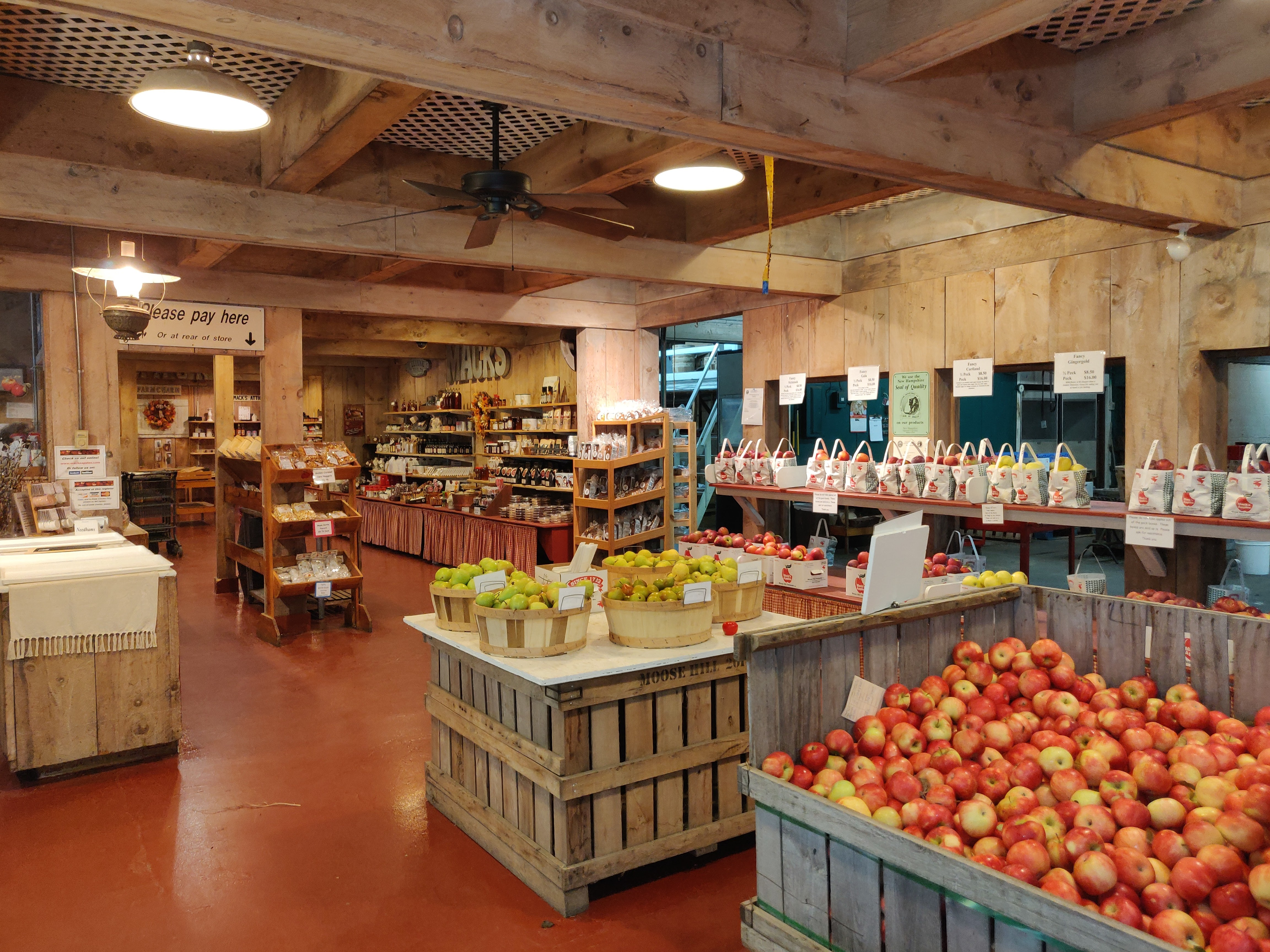
Farmers' market of Mack's Apples

- Total employment : 628,166
- Number of employer establishments: 39,298

According to the Bureau of Economic Analysis, in 2025, New Hampshire's gross state product was $125.5 billion and the state's per capita personal income was $86,959. Median household income in 2017 was $74,801, the fourth highest in the country (including Washington, DC). Its agricultural outputs are dairy products, nursery stock, cattle, apples and eggs. Its industrial outputs are machinery, electric equipment, rubber and plastic products, and tourism is a major component of the economy.

New Hampshire experienced a major shift in its economic base during the 20th century. Historically, the base was composed of traditional New England textiles, shoemaking, and small machine shops, drawing upon low-wage labor from nearby small farms and parts of Quebec. Today, of the state's total manufacturing dollar value, these sectors contribute only two percent for textiles, two percent for leather goods, and nine percent for machining. They experienced a sharp decline due to obsolete plants and the lure of cheaper wages in the Southern United States.

New Hampshire today has a broad-based and growing economy, with a state GDP growth rate of 2.8% in 2024. The state's largest economic sectors in 2018, based on contribution to GDP, are: 15% real estate and rental and leasing; 13% professional business services; 12% manufacturing; 10% government and government services; and 9% health care and social services. Small businesses make up 99.0% of businesses in the state and employ 50.3% of its work force.

The state's budget in FY2018 was $5.97 billion, including $1.79 billion in federal funds. The state has a property tax (subject to municipal control) but no sales or income tax. The state does have narrower taxes on meals, lodging, vehicles, and business income; it has tolls on some expressways. In 2025, the state was ranked third-best on the Tax Competitiveness Index created by the Tax Foundation.

According to the Energy Information Administration, New Hampshire's energy consumption and per capita energy consumption are among the lowest in the country. The Seabrook Station Nuclear Power Plant is the largest individual electrical generating unit on the New England power grid and provided 56% of New Hampshire's electricity generation in 2024. Natural gas accounted for around 25% of the state's electricity generation, while renewables, including hydroelectric power, biomass, wind, and solar supplied around 17%. Coal and petroleum sources account for around 1% of the total electricity generation in New Hampshire. New Hampshire is a net exporter of electricity and in 2024 it exported 10,913,961 megawatthours (MWh) of electricity.

New Hampshire's residential electricity use is low compared with the national average, in part because demand for air conditioning is low during the generally mild summer months and because few households use electricity as their primary energy source for home heating. Nearly half of New Hampshire households use fuel oil for winter heating, which is one of the largest shares in the United States.

The (preliminary) seasonally unemployment rate in November 2025 was 3.0% based on a 774,900 person civilian workforce with 751,300 people in employment.

=== Largest employers ===
In March 2018, 86% of New Hampshire's workforce were employed by the private sector, with 53% of those workers being employed by firms with fewer than 100 employees. About 14% of private-sector employees are employed by firms with more than 1,000 employees.

According to community surveys by the Economic & Labor Market Information Bureau of NH Employment Security, the following are the largest private employers in the state as of 2018:

| Employer | Location (base) | Employees |
|---|---|---|
| Dartmouth–Hitchcock Medical Center | Lebanon | 7,000 |
| Fidelity Investments | Merrimack | 6,000 |
| BAE Systems North America | Nashua | 4,700 |
| Liberty Mutual | Dover | 3,800 |
| Elliot Hospital | Manchester | 3,800 |
| Dartmouth College | Hanover | 3,500 |
| Southern New Hampshire University | Manchester | 3,200 |
| Capital Regional Health Care | Concord | 3,000 |
| Catholic Medical Center | Manchester | 2,300 |
| Southern New Hampshire Health System | Nashua | 2,200 |

New Hampshire's state government employs approximately 6,100 people. Additionally, the U.S. Department of State employs approximately 1,600 people at the National Visa Center and National Passport Center in Portsmouth, which process United States immigrant visa petitions and United States passport applications.

== Law and government ==
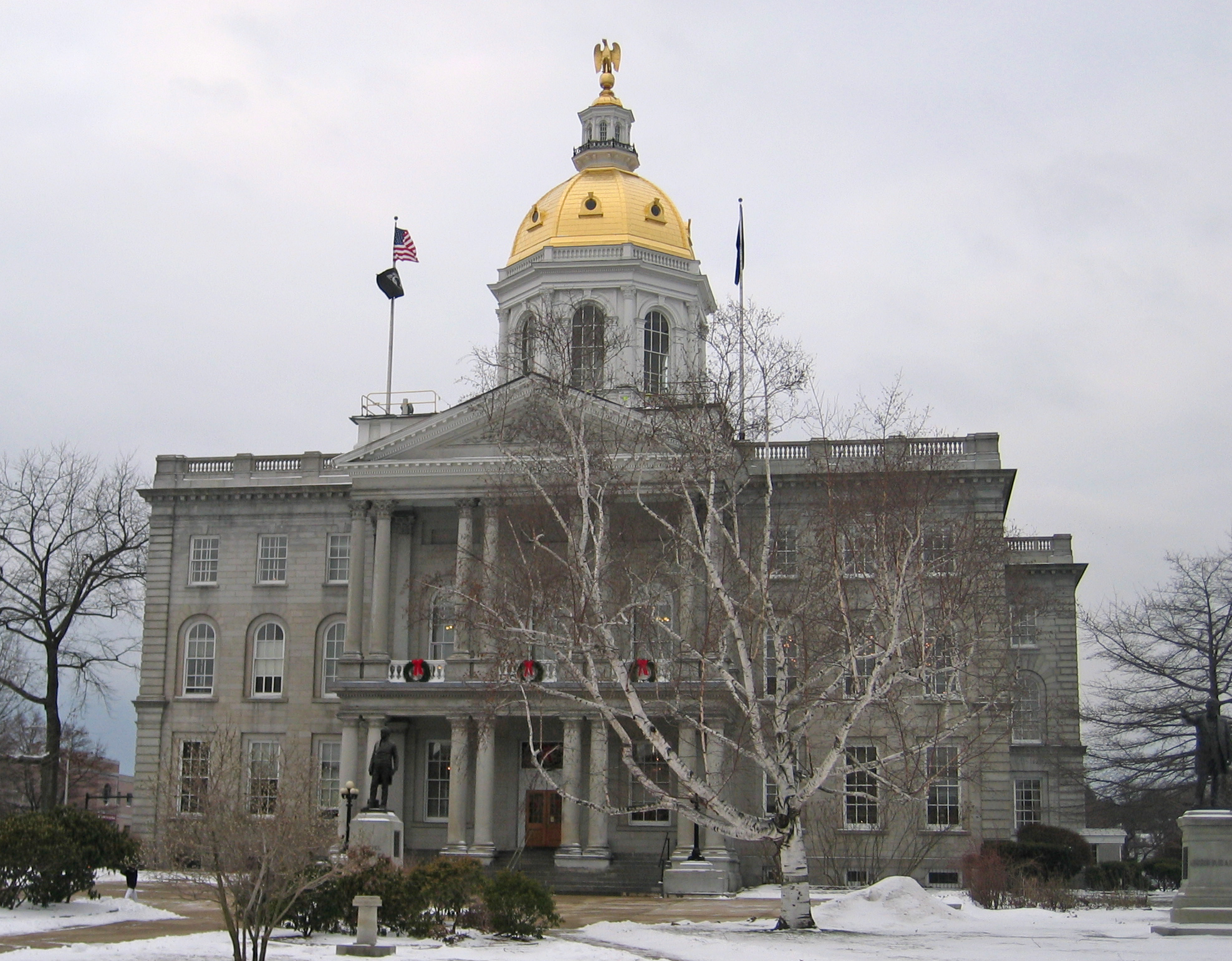
The New Hampshire State House in Concord

The governor of New Hampshire, since January 9, 2025, is Republican Kelly Ayotte. New Hampshire's two U.S. senators are Jeanne Shaheen and Maggie Hassan, both of whom are Democrats and former governors. New Hampshire's two U.S. representatives as of January 2025 are Chris Pappas and Maggie Goodlander, both Democrats.

New Hampshire is an alcoholic beverage control state, and through the State Liquor Commission takes in $100 million from the sale and distribution of liquor.

New Hampshire is the only state in the U.S. that does not require adults to wear seat belts in their vehicles. It is one of three states that have no mandatory helmet law.

=== Governing documents ===
The New Hampshire State Constitution of 1783 is the supreme law of the state, followed by the New Hampshire Revised Statutes Annotated and the New Hampshire Code of Administrative Rules. These are roughly analogous to the federal United States Constitution, United States Code and Code of Federal Regulations respectively.

=== Branches of government ===
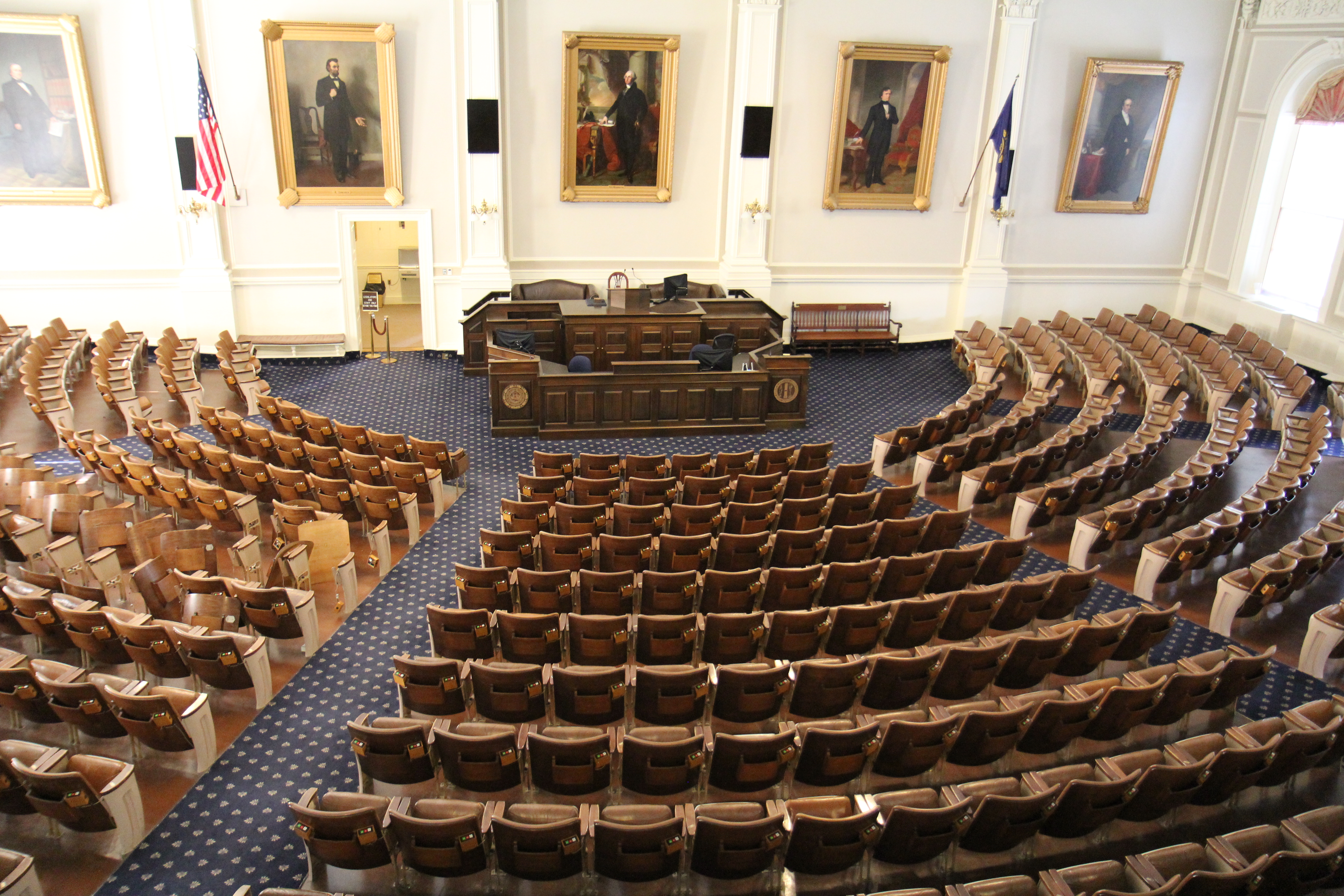
Chamber of the New Hampshire House of Representatives. The House is the fourth-largest lower house in the English-speaking world.

New Hampshire has a bifurcated executive branch, consisting of the governor and a five-member executive council which votes on state contracts worth more than $10,000 and "advises and consents" to the governor's nominations to major state positions such as department heads and all judgeships and pardon requests. New Hampshire does not have a lieutenant governor; the Senate president serves as "acting governor" whenever the governor is unable to perform the duties.

The legislature is called the General Court. It consists of the House of Representatives and the Senate. There are 400 representatives, making it one of the largest elected bodies in the English-speaking world, and 24 senators. Legislators are paid a nominal salary of $200 per two-year term plus travel costs, the lowest in the U.S. by far. Thus most are effectively volunteers, nearly half of whom are retirees. (For details, see the article on Government of New Hampshire.)

The state's sole appellate court is the New Hampshire Supreme Court. The Superior Court is the court of general jurisdiction and the only court that provides for jury trials in civil or criminal cases. The other state courts are the Probate Court, District Court, and the Family Division.

=== Local government ===
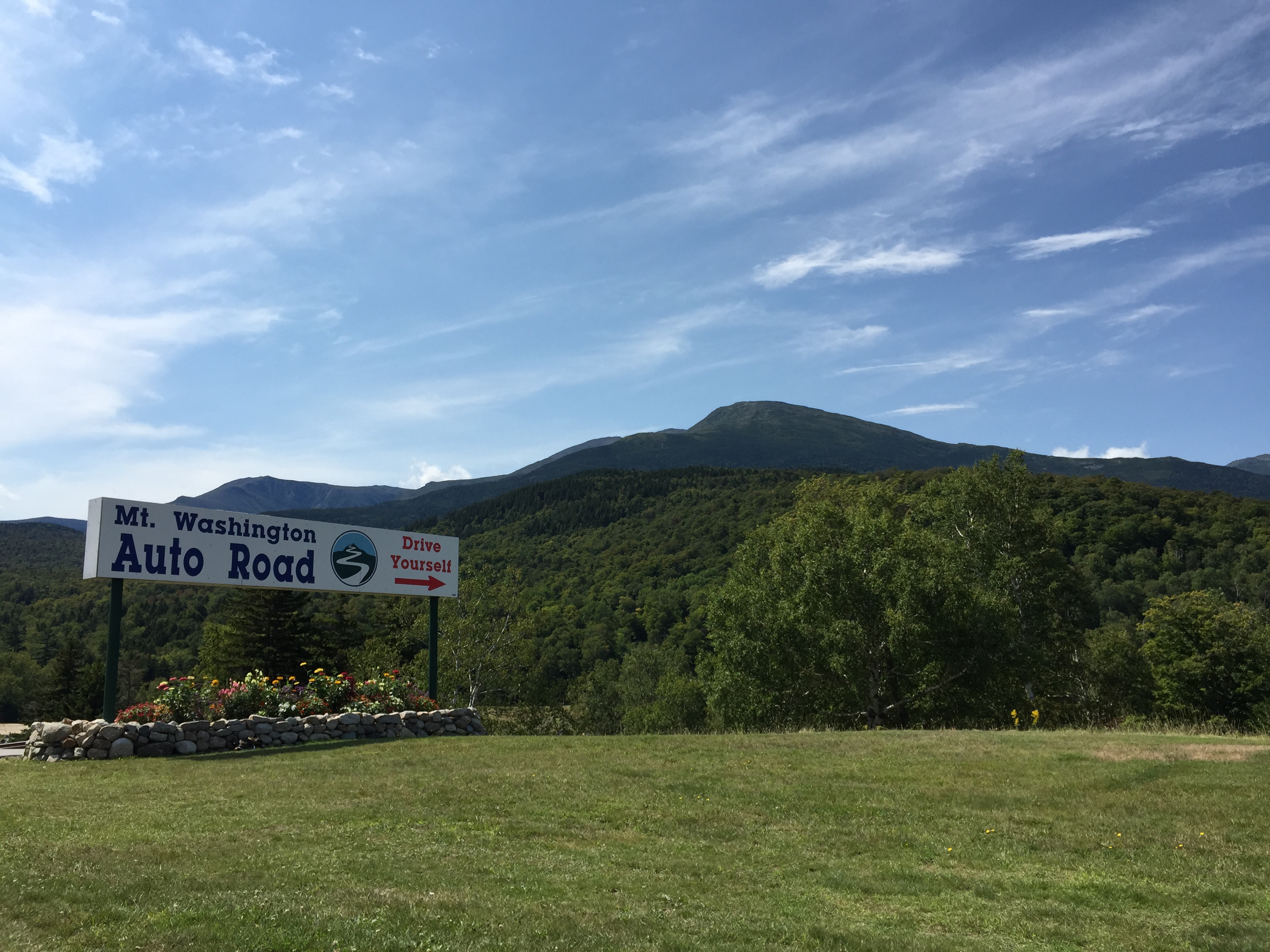
Entrance to the Mount Washington Auto Road in the township of Green's Grant.

New Hampshire has 10 counties and 234 cities and towns.

New Hampshire is a "Dillon Rule" state, meaning municipalities cannot act except where there is a state enabling law. The legislature tends to favor local control, particularly concerning land-use regulations, but may rein in such regulation to address statewide issues. For example, the legislature has mandated that municipalities make some allowance for mobile homes. In 2025, the legislature allowed homeowners to add one accessory dwelling unit (ADU) without municipal permission. In 2026, a state law directed municipalities to permit tiny homes.

New Hampshire municipalities are classified as towns or cities, which differ primarily by the form of government. Most towns generally operate on the town meeting form of government, where the registered voters in the town act as the town legislature, and a board of selectmen acts as the executive of the town. Larger towns and the state's thirteen cities operate either on a council–manager or mayor-council form of government. State law does not treat cities differently from towns.

New Hampshire has a small number of unincorporated areas that are titled as grants, locations, purchases, or townships (which are different from towns). These locations have little to no self-government; services are generally provided for them by neighboring towns or the county or state. As of the 2020 census, there were 25 of these left, comprising 216 people; several were entirely depopulated. All but two of these unincorporated areas are in Coös County.

=== Politics ===
New Hampshire is known for its fiscal conservatism and cultural liberalism. The state's politics are cited as libertarian-leaning. The state has consistently been ranked the most free state by the Cato Institute's Freedom in the 50 States ranking. It is the least religious state in the Union as of a 2016 Gallup poll. The state has long disdained state taxation and state bureaucracy.

The Republican Party and the Democratic Party, in that order, are the two largest parties in the state. A plurality of voters are registered as undeclared, and can choose either ballot in the primary and then regain their undeclared status after voting. As of September 18, 2026, there were 862,162 registered voters, of whom 307,254 (35.64%) were undeclared, 298,965 (34.68%) were Republican, and 255,943 (29.69) were Democratic. The Libertarian Party is not an official party in New Hampshire, based on election results in the most recent biennial election, though it was from 1990 to 1996 and from 2016 to 2018.

As of 2025, the Republican Party controls the governorship, the Executive Council, and both houses of the legislature. However, the Democratic Party controls all four seats in the state's delegation to Congress.

==== New Hampshire primary ====
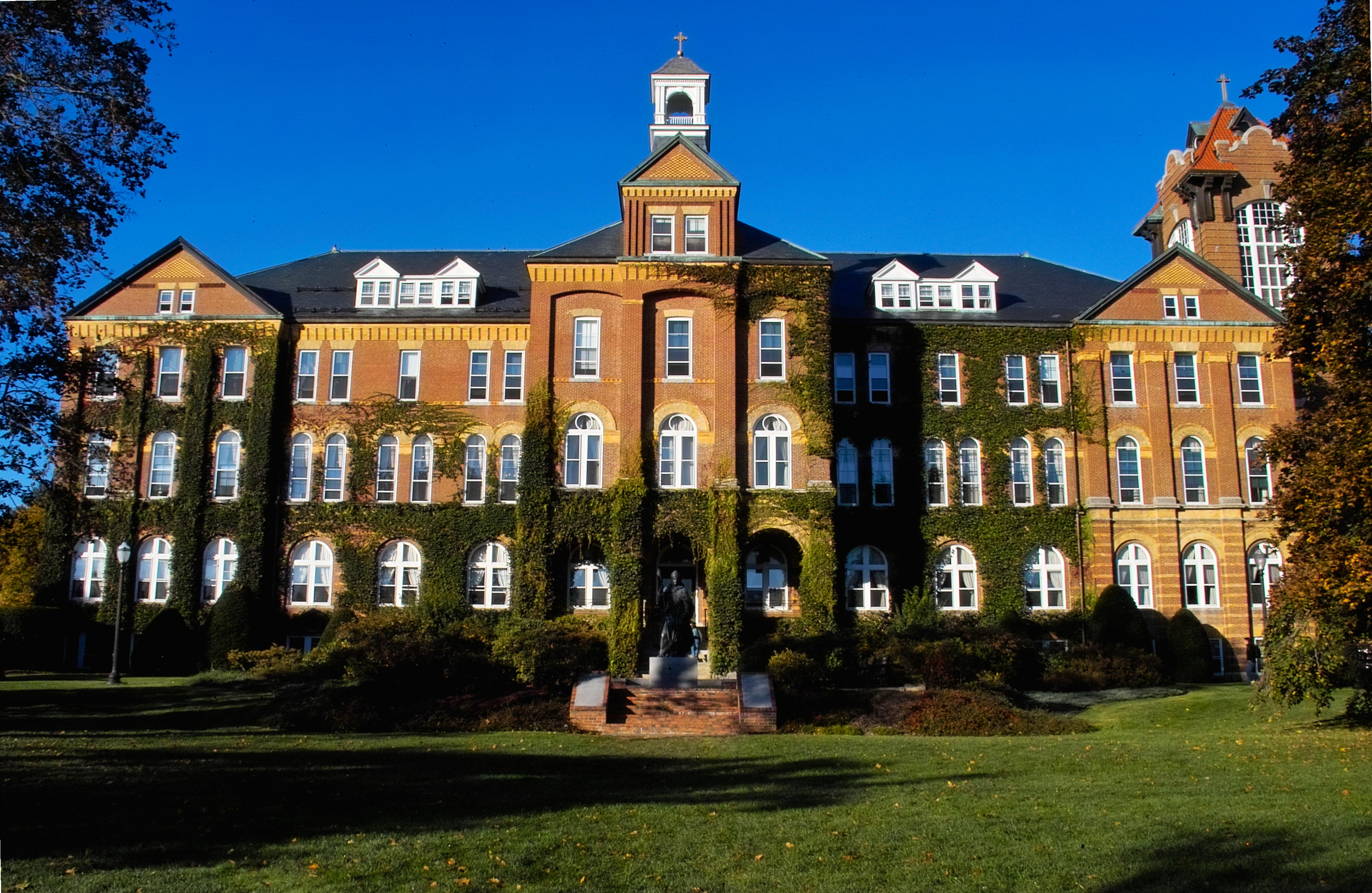
Saint Anselm College has held several national debates on campus.

The New Hampshire primary is the first primary election in the quadrennial American presidential election cycle. State law requires that the Secretary of State schedule this election at least one week before any "similar event". While the Iowa caucus precedes the New Hampshire primary, the New Hampshire election is the nation's first contest that uses the same procedure as the general election. It draws more attention than those in other states and shapes the national contest.

In February 2023, the Democratic National Committee awarded that party's first primary to South Carolina, to be held on February 3, 2024, directing New Hampshire and Nevada to vote three days later. New Hampshire officials from both parties stood by the state's "first in the nation" law and ignored the DNC.

State law permits a town with fewer than 100 residents to open its polls at midnight and close when all registered citizens have cast their ballots. Dixville Notch in Coos County and Hart's Location in Carroll County, among others, have implemented these provisions. Dixville Notch and Hart's Location are thus the first precincts in both New Hampshire and the U.S. to report results in presidential primaries and elections.

Nominations for all other partisan offices are decided in a separate primary election. In Presidential election cycles, this is the second primary election held in New Hampshire.

Saint Anselm College in Goffstown has become a popular campaign spot for politicians as well as several national presidential debates.

==== Elections ====
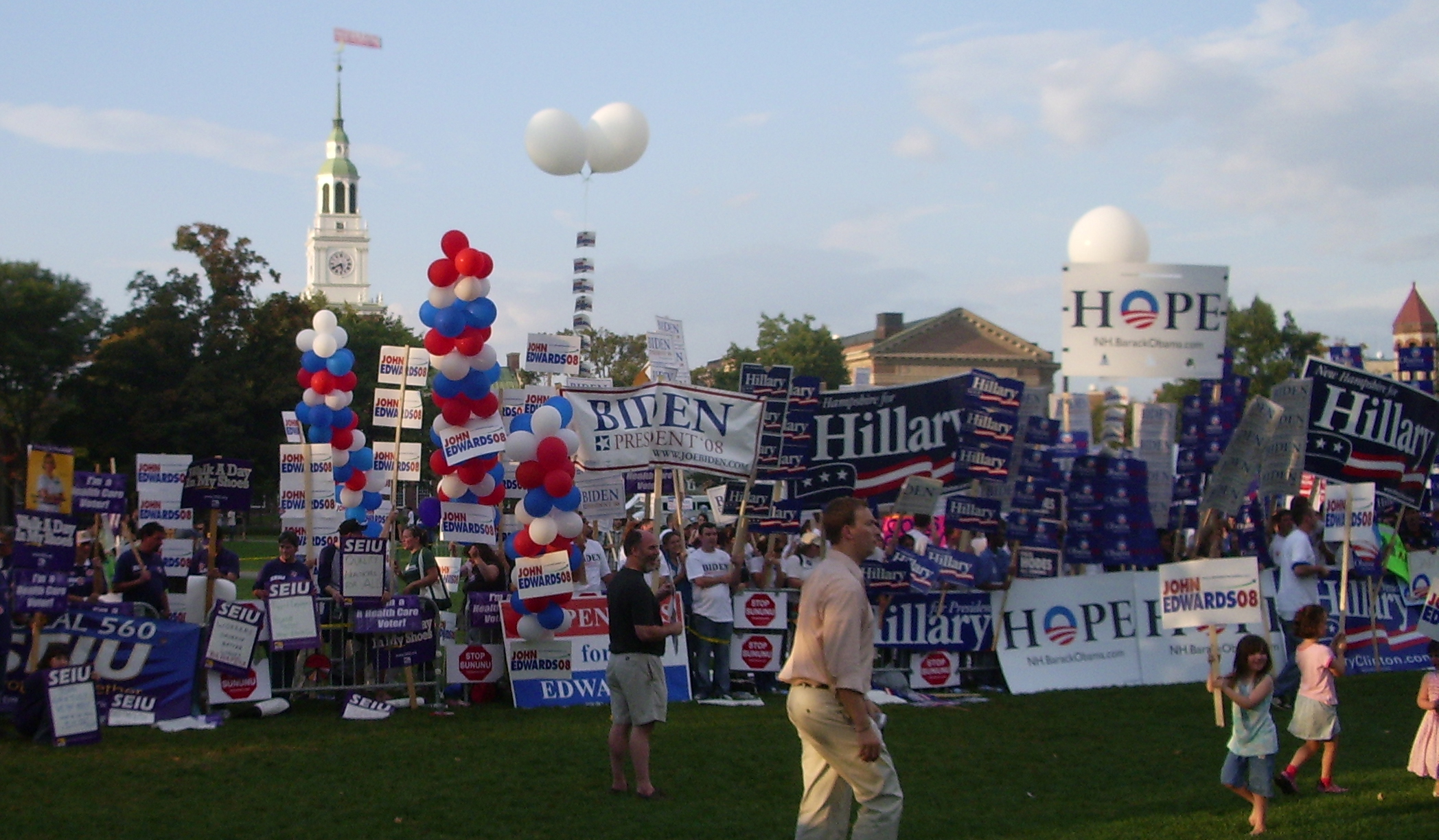
Dartmouth College before a debate in 2008

Historically, New Hampshire has often voted Republican. Between 1856 and 1988, New Hampshire cast its electoral votes for the Democratic presidential ticket six times: Woodrow Wilson (twice), Franklin D. Roosevelt (three times), and Lyndon B. Johnson (once).

Beginning in 1992, New Hampshire became a swing state in national and local elections, and in that time has supported Democrats in all presidential elections except 2000. It was the only state in the country to switch from supporting Republican George W. Bush in the 2000 election to supporting his Democratic challenger in the 2004 election, when John Kerry, a senator from neighboring Massachusetts, won the state.

The Democrats dominated elections in New Hampshire in 2006 and 2008. In 2006, Democrats won both congressional seats (electing Carol Shea-Porter in the first district and Paul Hodes in the second), re-elected Governor John Lynch, and gained a majority on the Executive Council and in both houses for the first time since 1911. Democrats had not held both the legislature and the governorship since 1874. Neither U.S. Senate seat was up for a vote in 2006. In 2008, Democrats retained their majorities, the governorship, and their congressional seats, and former governor Jeanne Shaheen defeated incumbent Republican John E. Sununu for the U.S. Senate in a rematch of the 2002 contest.

The 2008 elections resulted in women holding a majority, 13 of the 24 seats, in the New Hampshire Senate, a first for any legislative body in the United States.

In the 2010 midterm elections, Republicans made historic gains in New Hampshire, capturing veto-proof majorities in the state legislature, taking all five seats in the Executive Council, electing a new U.S. senator, Kelly Ayotte, winning both U.S. House seats, and reducing the margin of victory of incumbent Governor John Lynch compared to his 2006 and 2008 landslide wins.

In the 2012 state legislative elections, Democrats took back the New Hampshire House of Representatives and narrowed the Republican majority in the New Hampshire Senate to 13–11. In 2012, New Hampshire became the first state in U.S. history to elect an all-female federal delegation: Democratic congresswomen Carol Shea-Porter of Congressional District 1 and Ann McLane Kuster of Congressional District 2 joined U.S. senators Jeanne Shaheen and Kelly Ayotte in 2013. Further, the state elected its second female governor: Democrat Maggie Hassan.

In the 2014 elections, Republicans retook the New Hampshire House of Representatives with a 239–160 majority and expanded their majority in the New Hampshire Senate to 14 of the Senate's 24 seats. On the national level, incumbent Democratic Senator Jeanne Shaheen defeated her Republican challenger, former Massachusetts senator Scott Brown. New Hampshire also elected Frank Guinta (R) for its First Congressional District representative and Ann Kuster (D) for its Second Congressional District representative.

In the 2016 elections, Republicans held the New Hampshire House of Representatives with a majority of 220–175 and held onto their 14 seats in the New Hampshire Senate. In the gubernatorial race, outgoing Governor Maggie Hassan was succeeded by Republican Chris Sununu, who defeated Democratic nominee Colin Van Ostern. Sununu became the state's first Republican governor since Craig Benson, who left office in 2005 following defeat by John Lynch. In the presidential race, the state voted for the Democratic nominee, former Secretary of State Hillary Clinton over the Republican nominee, Donald Trump, by a margin of 2,736 votes, or 0.3%, one of the closest results the state has ever seen in a presidential race, while Libertarian nominee Gary Johnson received 4.12% of the vote. The Democrats also won a competitive race in the Second Congressional District, as well as a competitive senate race.

Since 2017, Democrats have controlled New Hampshire's entire congressional delegation, while Republicans have controlled the governorship and (except in 2019–2020) both houses of the legislature.

==== Free State Project ====
The Free State Project (FSP) is a movement founded in 2001 to recruit at least 20,000 libertarians to move to a single low-population state (New Hampshire, was selected in 2003), to concentrate libertarian activism around a single region. The Free State Project emphasizes decentralized decision-making, encouraging new movers and prior residents of New Hampshire to participate in a way the individual mover deems most appropriate. For example, as of 2017, there were 17 so-called Free Staters elected to the New Hampshire House of Representatives, and in 2021, the New Hampshire Liberty Alliance, which ranks bills and elected representatives based on their adherence to what they see as libertarian principles, scored 150 representatives as "A−" or above rated representatives. Participants also engage with other like-minded activist groups such as Rebuild New Hampshire, Young Americans for Liberty, and Americans for Prosperity. As of April 2022, approximately 6,232 participants have moved to New Hampshire for the Free State Project.

== Transportation ==
=== Highways ===
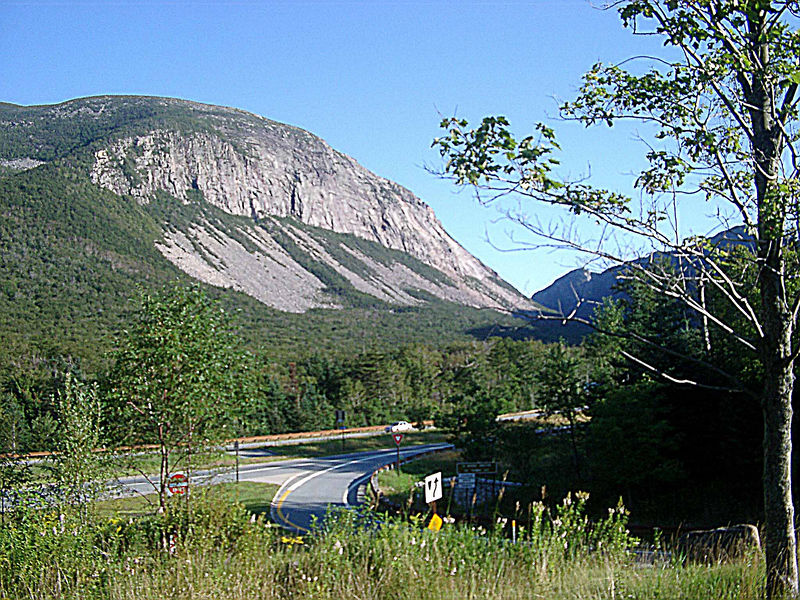
Cannon Mountain in Franconia Notch overlooking I-93 and US Route 3. Both routes are major roads in New Hampshire; US Route 3 runs from the state's northernmost border to its southernmost border.

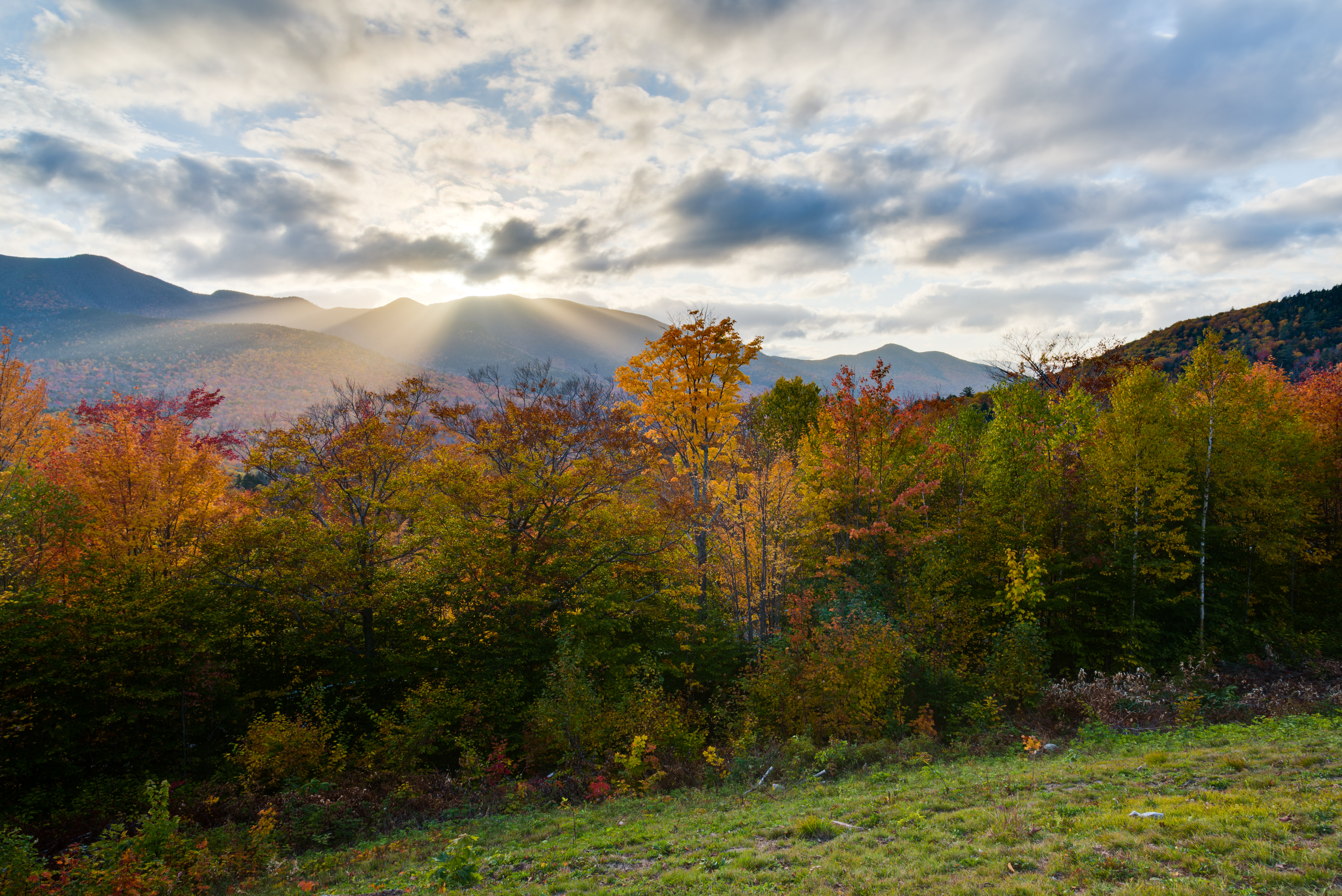
View from the Kancamagus Highway, one of New Hampshire's three National Scenic Byways

New Hampshire has a well-maintained, well-signed network of Interstate highways, U.S. highways, and state highways. State highway markers still depict the Old Man of the Mountain despite that rock formation's demise in 2003. Several route numbers align with the same route numbers in neighboring states. State highway numbering is arbitrary, with no overall system, while the U.S. highway and Interstate systems follow national numbering conventions. Major routes include:

- Interstate 89 runs northwest from near Concord to Lebanon on the Vermont border.
- Interstate 93 is the main Interstate highway in New Hampshire and runs north from Salem (on the Massachusetts border) to Littleton (on the Vermont border). I-93 connects the more densely populated southern part of the state to the Lakes Region and the White Mountains further to the north.
- Interstate 95 runs north–south briefly along New Hampshire's seacoast to serve the city of Portsmouth, before entering Maine
- U.S. Route 1 runs north–south briefly along New Hampshire's seacoast to the east of and paralleling I-95.
- U.S. Route 2 runs east–west through Coos County from Maine, intersecting Route 16, skirting the White Mountain National Forest passing through Jefferson and into Vermont.
- U.S. Route 3 is the longest numbered route in the state, and the only one to run completely through the state from the Massachusetts border to the Canada–U.S. border. It generally parallels Interstate 93. South of Manchester, it takes a more westerly route through Nashua. North of Franconia Notch, U.S. 3 takes a more easterly route, before terminating at the Canada–U.S. border.
- U.S. Route 4 terminates at the Portsmouth Traffic Circle and runs east–west across the southern part of the state connecting Durham, Concord, Boscawen, and Lebanon.
- New Hampshire Route 16 is a major north–south highway in the eastern part of the state that generally parallels the border with Maine, eventually entering Maine as Maine Route 16. The southernmost portion of NH 16 is a four-lane freeway, co-signed with U.S. Route 4.
- New Hampshire Route 101 is a major east–west highway in the southern part of the state that connects Keene with Manchester and the Seacoast region. East of Manchester, NH 101 is a four-lane, limited-access highway that runs to Hampton Beach and I-95.

=== National Scenic Byways ===
New Hampshire is home to three National Scenic Byways designated by the United States Department of Transportation (USDOT). The USDOT recognizes and designates National Scenic Byways in one of six classes: archeological, cultural, historic, natural, recreational, and scenic. They are:

- White Mountain Trail (scenic) - Extends from Lincoln to Conway connecting at both ends to the Kancamagus Highway. The route, which runs through the White Mountain National Forest, Franconia Notch State Park, and Crawford Notch State Park, is known for its views of the White Mountains.
- Kancamagus Scenic Byway (scenic) - Extends from North Woodstock to Conway, contains the Kancamagus Highway. The route is best known for its views of foliage in autumn.
- Connecticut River Byway (historic) - Extends from West Chesterfield to Littleton, continues in the states of Massachusetts and Vermont. The route is best known for its views of the Connecticut River and historic villages near the banks.

=== Air ===
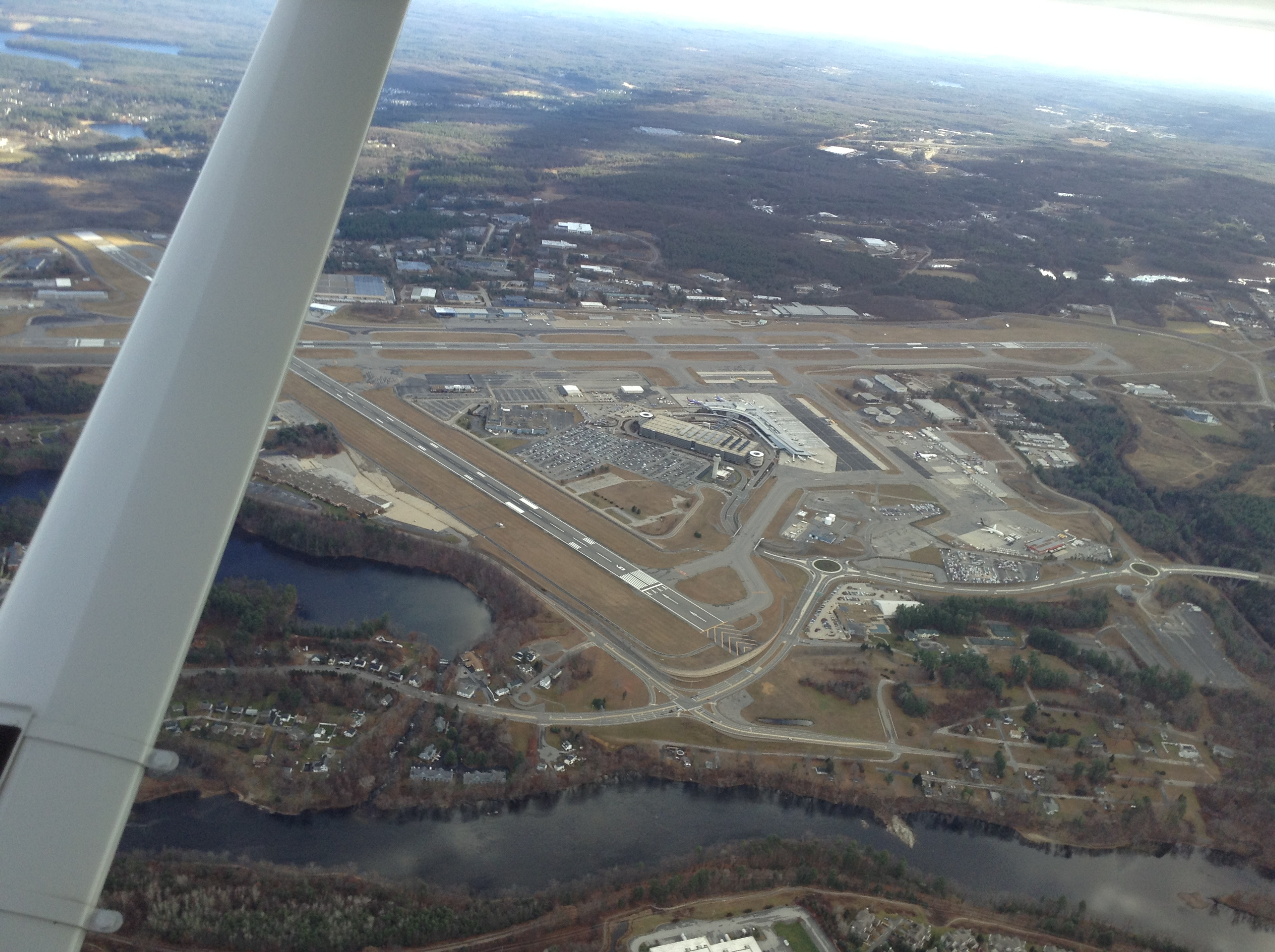
Manchester–Boston Regional Airport from the air

New Hampshire has 25 public-use airports, three with some scheduled commercial passenger service. The busiest airport by number of passengers handled is Manchester-Boston Regional Airport in Manchester and Londonderry, which serves the Greater Boston metropolitan area. The closest airport with international service is Logan International Airport in Boston.

=== Public transportation ===
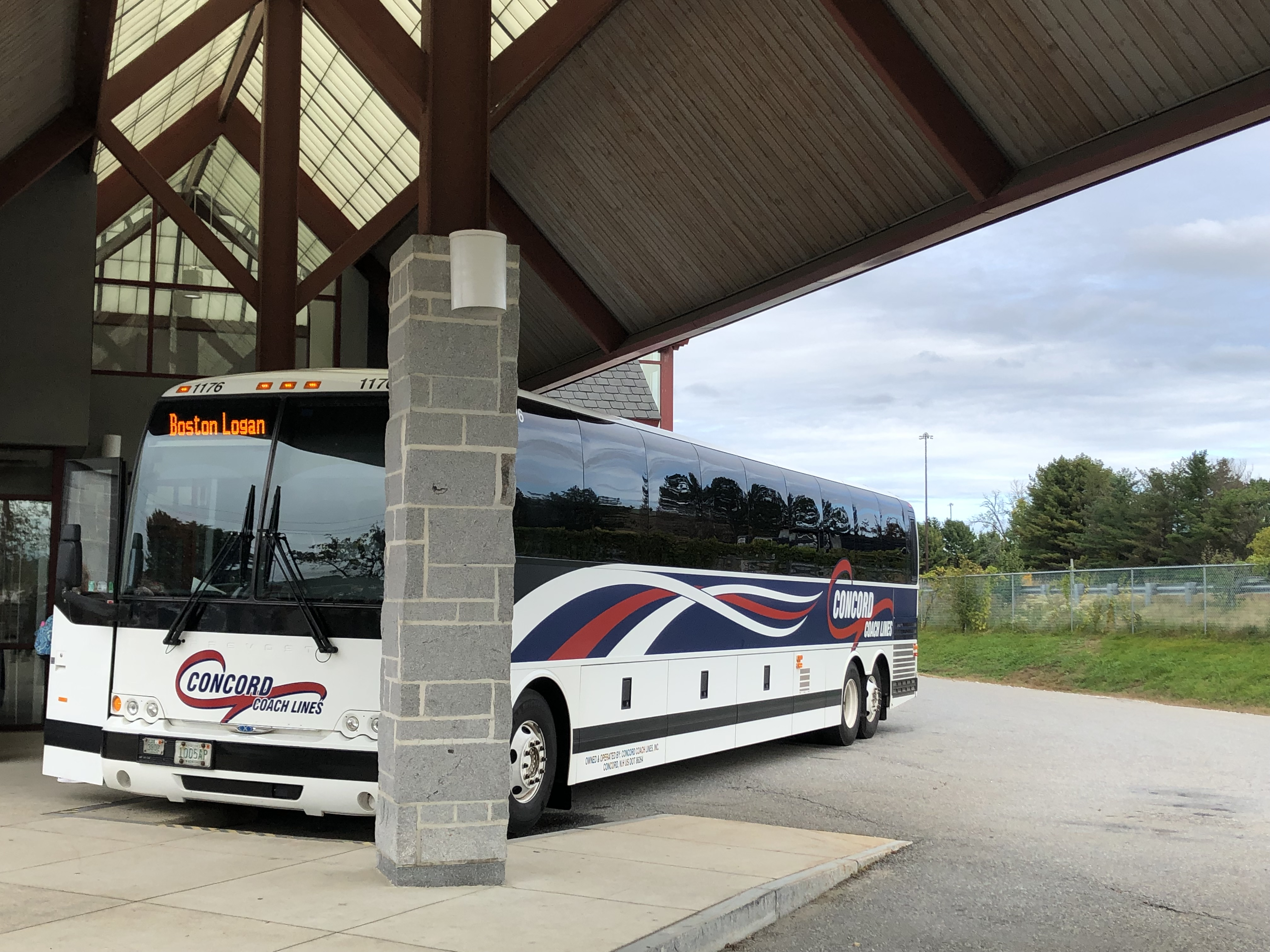
Concord Coach Lines, which operates Concord Coach (pictured) and Dartmouth Coach, provides intercity bus service within the state and to destinations such as Boston, Massachusetts.

Greyhound, Concord Coach, Vermont Translines, Dartmouth Coach, and four other private carriers provide intercity bus service and link with the national intercity bus network. Eleven public transit authorities operate local and regional bus services around the state. The New Hampshire Department of Transportation operates a statewide ride-sharing match service, in addition to independent ride-matching and guaranteed-ride-home programs.

Long-distance intercity passenger rail service is provided by Amtrak's Vermonter and Downeaster lines.

As of 2013, Boston-centered MBTA Commuter Rail services reach only as far as northern Massachusetts. The New Hampshire Rail Transit Authority is working to extend "Capital Corridor" service from Lowell, Massachusetts, to Nashua, Concord, and Manchester, including Manchester-Boston Regional Airport; and "Coastal Corridor" service from Haverhill, Massachusetts, to Plaistow, New Hampshire. Legislation in 2007 created the New Hampshire Rail Transit Authority (NHRTA) with the goal of overseeing the development of commuter rail in the state of New Hampshire. In 2011, Governor John Lynch vetoed HB 218, a bill passed by Republican lawmakers, which would have drastically curtailed the powers and responsibilities of NHRTA. The I-93 Corridor transit study suggested a rail alternative along the Manchester and Lawrence branch line which could provide freight and passenger service. This rail corridor would also have access to Manchester-Boston Regional Airport.

Tourist railroads include the Conway Scenic Railroad, Hobo-Winnipesaukee Railroad, and the Mount Washington Cog Railway.

=== Freight railways ===
Freight railways in New Hampshire include Claremont & Concord Railroad (CCRR), Pan Am Railways via subsidiary Springfield Terminal Railway (ST), the New England Central Railroad (NHCR), the St. Lawrence and Atlantic Railroad (SLR), and New Hampshire Northcoast Corporation (NHN).

== Education ==
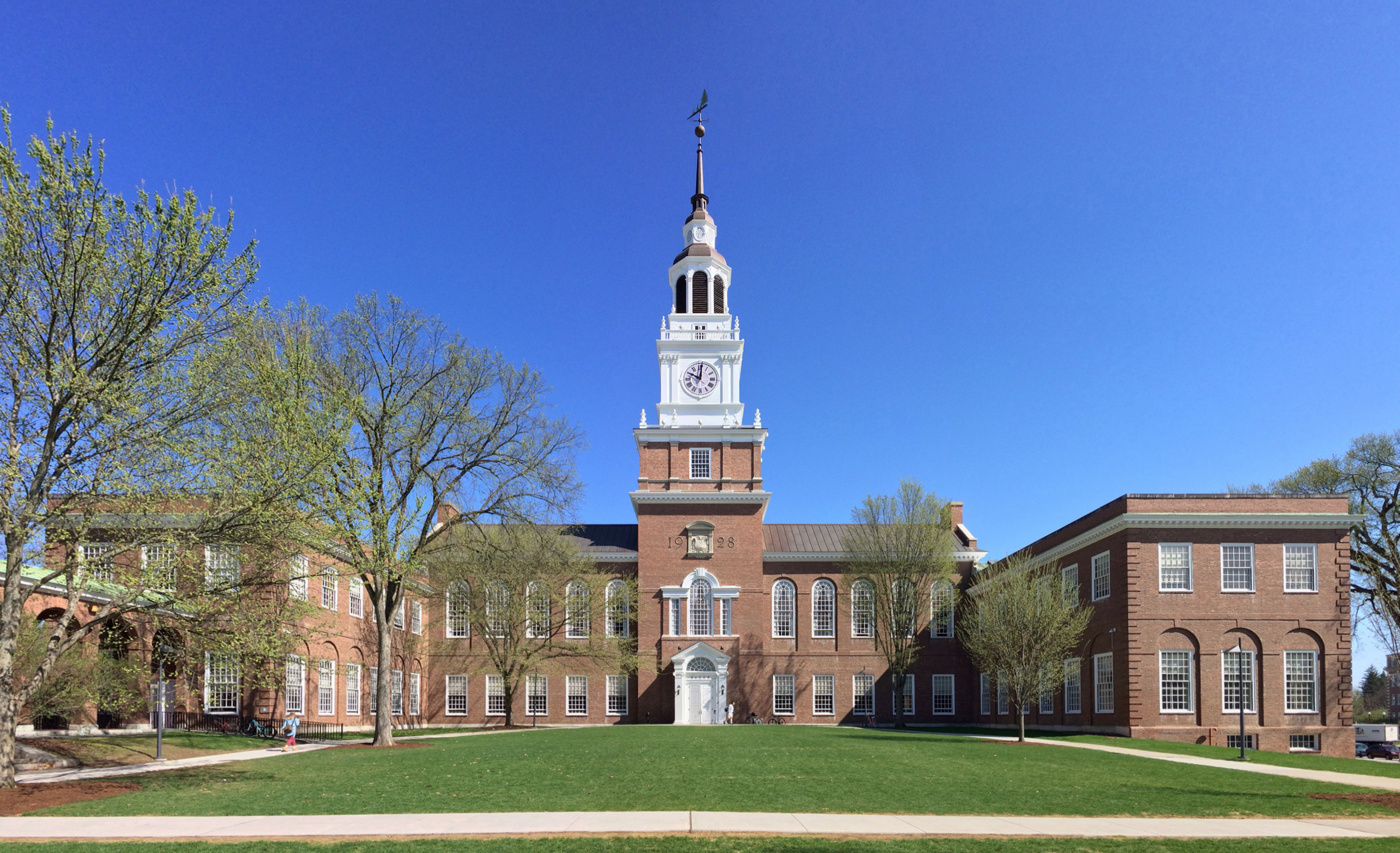
Dartmouth College's Baker Library

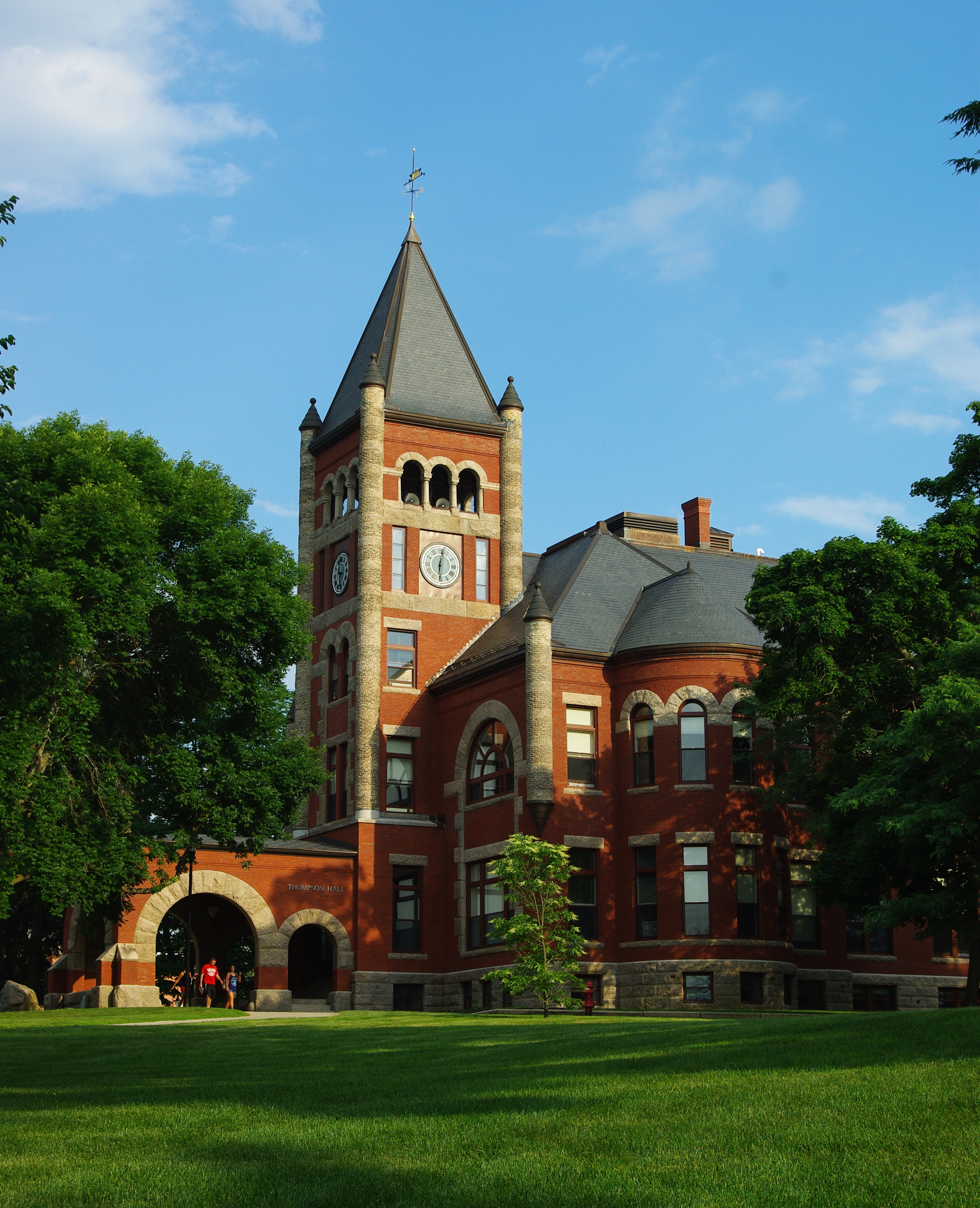
Thompson Hall, at UNH, was built in 1892.

New Hampshire's education system includes public school districts, private schools, and a variety of school choice initiatives. One significant component of the latter is the New Hampshire Education Freedom Accounts program, a statewide initiative that allows eligible families to direct a portion of state education funding toward approved educational expenses outside of traditional public schools.

The average cost per pupil for public K-12 education in New Hampshire exceeded $21,000, with most funding coming from local property taxes. In 2025, the state expanded Education Freedom Accounts into a universal school choice program, making most students eligible to participate.

=== High schools ===
The first public high schools in the state were the Boys' High School and the Girls' High School of Portsmouth, established either in 1827 or 1830, depending on the source.

New Hampshire has more than 80 public high schools, many of which serve more than one town. The largest is Pinkerton Academy in Derry, which is owned by a private non-profit organization and serves as the public high school of several neighboring towns. There are at least 30 private high schools in the state.

New Hampshire is also the home of several prestigious university-preparatory schools, such as Phillips Exeter Academy, St. Paul's School, Proctor Academy, Brewster Academy, and Kimball Union Academy.

Traditionally, school funding has been decided by municipalities, often at town meetings. In 1993, the Claremont litigation began when that town's school district secured a verdict that Part 2, Article 83 of the state constitution required the state to fund education adequately and uniformly. This was never achieved despite additional rounds of litigation. In 2002, New Hampshire enacted a statewide property tax to be forwarded to school districts to address the problem. In 2008, the Court ended its supervisory role because the original laws had been replaced, but it did not reverse its earlier finding. In 2023, a district judge set a new, higher amount for educational "adequacy". The New Hampshire Supreme Court upheld this ruling, but declined to force the legislature to comply. In June 2025, the legislature enacted language asserting its right to determine funding. In February 2026, the attorney general asked the state supreme court to rule that the 1993 case had been wrongly decided.

=== Colleges and universities ===
- Antioch University New England
- Colby-Sawyer College
- Community College System of New Hampshire:
  - Great Bay Community College
  - Lakes Region Community College
  - Manchester Community College
  - Nashua Community College
  - NHTI, Concord's Community College
  - River Valley Community College
  - White Mountains Community College
- Dartmouth College
  - Tuck School of Business
  - Geisel School of Medicine
  - Thayer School of Engineering
  - Guarini School of Graduate and Advanced Studies
- Franklin Pierce University
- Hellenic American University
- Massachusetts College of Pharmacy and Health Sciences
- New England College
- New Hampshire Institute of Art
- Rivier University
- Saint Anselm College
- Southern New Hampshire University
- Thomas More College of Liberal Arts
- University System of New Hampshire:
  - University of New Hampshire
    - University of New Hampshire School of Law
    - University of New Hampshire at Manchester
  - Granite State College
  - Keene State College
  - Plymouth State University

== Media ==
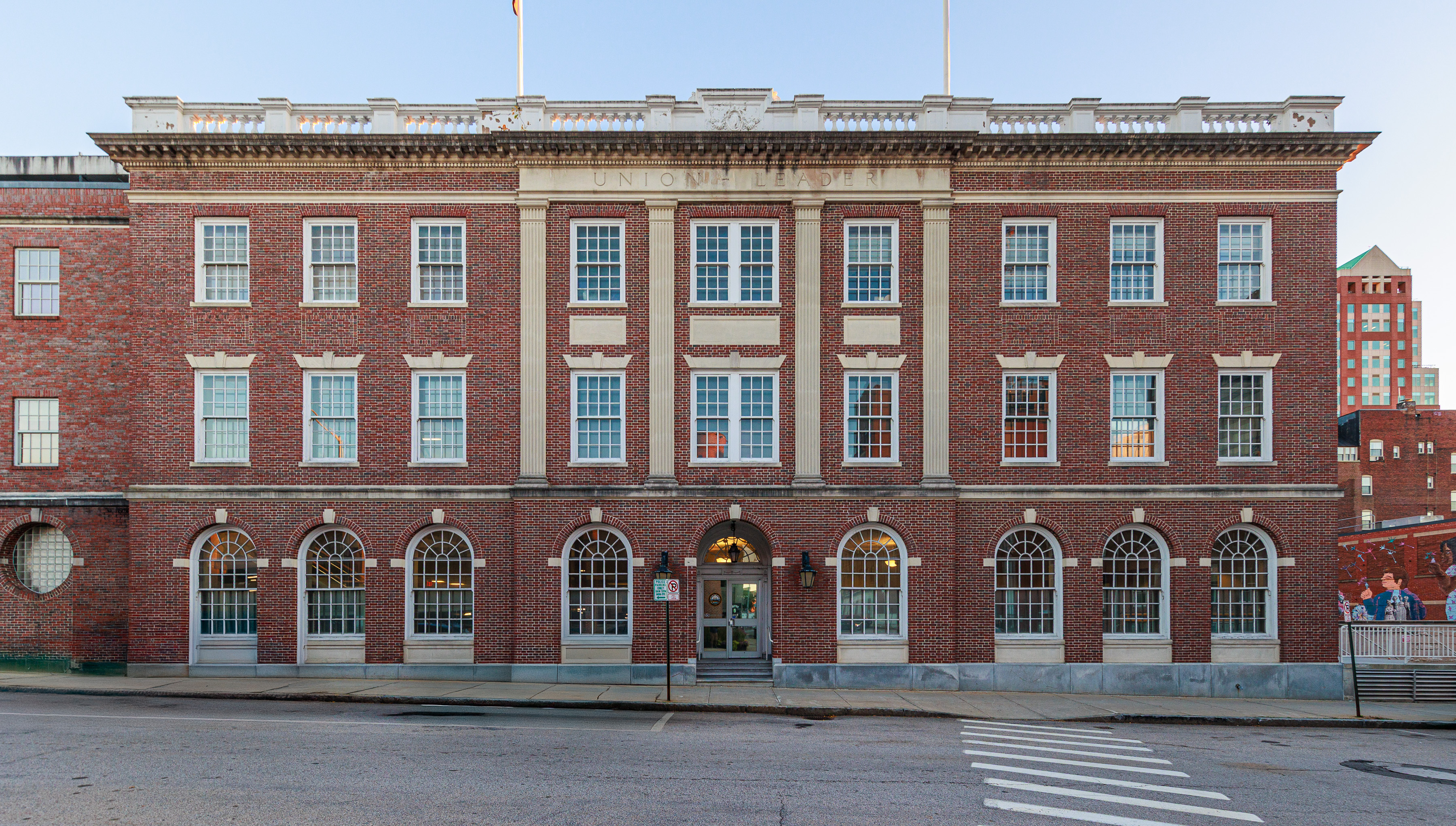
Former headquarters of the New Hampshire Union Leader, the state's most-read paper, in Manchester

=== Daily newspapers ===
- Berlin Daily Sun
- Concord Monitor
- Conway Daily Sun
- Eagle Times of Claremont
- Eagle Tribune (Lawrence, Massachusetts area, including parts of southern New Hampshire)
- Foster's Daily Democrat of Dover
- Keene Sentinel
- Laconia Daily Sun
- New Hampshire Union Leader of Manchester, formerly known as the Manchester Union Leader
- The Portsmouth Herald
- The Sun (Lowell, Massachusetts area, including parts of southern New Hampshire)
- Valley News of Lebanon

=== Other publications ===
- Area News Group
- Business New Hampshire Magazine
- The Cabinet Press
  - Milford Cabinet
  - Bedford Journal
  - Hollis/Brookline Journal
  - Merrimack Journal
- The Dartmouth (Dartmouth College student newspaper)
- The Exeter News-Letter
- Free Keene
- The Hampton Union
- Hippo Press (covering Manchester, Nashua, and Concord)
- Manchester Express
- Manchester Ink Link
- The New Hampshire (University of New Hampshire student newspaper)
- New Hampshire Business Review
- Granite Grok
- The New Hampshire Gazette (Portsmouth alternative biweekly)
- NH Living Magazine
- NH Rocks
- Salmon Press Newspapers (family of weekly newspapers covering Lakes Region and North Country)
- The Telegraph of Nashua

=== Television stations ===
- ABC affiliate WMUR, Channel 9, Manchester
- PBS affiliate Channel 11, Durham (New Hampshire Public Television); repeater stations in Keene and Littleton
- True Crime Network affiliate WWJE, Channel 50, Derry/Manchester
- Ion Television station WPXG, Channel 21, Concord (satellite of WBPX in Boston)

== Sports ==
The following sports teams are based in New Hampshire:

| Club | Sport | Venue | League | Level | notes |
|---|---|---|---|---|---|
| Amoskeag Rugby Club | Rugby union | Northeast Athletic Club, Pembroke | New England Rugby Football Union | Amateur | |
| Keene Swamp Bats | Baseball | Alumni Field, Keene | New England Collegiate Baseball League | Collegiate summer baseball | |
| Nashua Silver Knights | Baseball | Holman Stadium, Nashua | Futures Collegiate Baseball League | Collegiate summer baseball | |
| New Hampshire Fisher Cats | Baseball | Delta Dental Stadium, Manchester | Double-A Eastern League | Professional | Double-A affiliate of the Toronto Blue Jays |
| New Hampshire Wild | Baseball | Doane Diamond, Concord | Empire Professional Baseball League | Professional | Independent minor league |
| Northeast Ruckus | American football | Nor Rock Field | Womans Football Alliance | Semi-professional | Based in Windham, plays home games in nearby Raymond, New Hampshire |
| Seacoast United Phantoms | Soccer | New England Sports Park | USL League Two | Semi-professional | Based in Portsmouth, plays home games in nearby Hampton, New Hampshire |
| New Hampshire Mountain Kings | Ice Hockey | Tri-Town Ice Arena, Hooksett | North American Hockey League | Amateur | |

The sport of paintball was invented in Henniker in 1981. Sutton was the home of the world's first commercial paintball facility.

The New Hampshire Motor Speedway in Loudon is an oval track and road course that has been visited by national motorsport championship series such as the NASCAR Cup Series, the NASCAR Xfinity Series, the NASCAR Craftsman Truck Series, NASCAR Whelen Modified Tour, American Canadian Tour (ACT), the Champ Car and the IndyCar Series. Other motor racing venues include Star Speedway and New England Dragway in Epping, Lee USA Speedway in Lee, Twin State Speedway in Claremont, Monadnock Speedway in Winchester and Canaan Fair Speedway in Canaan.

New Hampshire has two universities competing at the NCAA Division I in all collegiate sports: the Dartmouth Big Green (Ivy League) and the New Hampshire Wildcats (America East Conference), as well as three NCAA Division II teams: Franklin Pierce Ravens, Saint Anselm Hawks, and Southern New Hampshire Penmen (Northeast-10 Conference). Most other schools compete in NCAA Division III or the NAIA.

Annually since 2002, high-school statewide all-stars compete against Vermont in 10 sports during "Twin State" playoffs.

== Culture ==
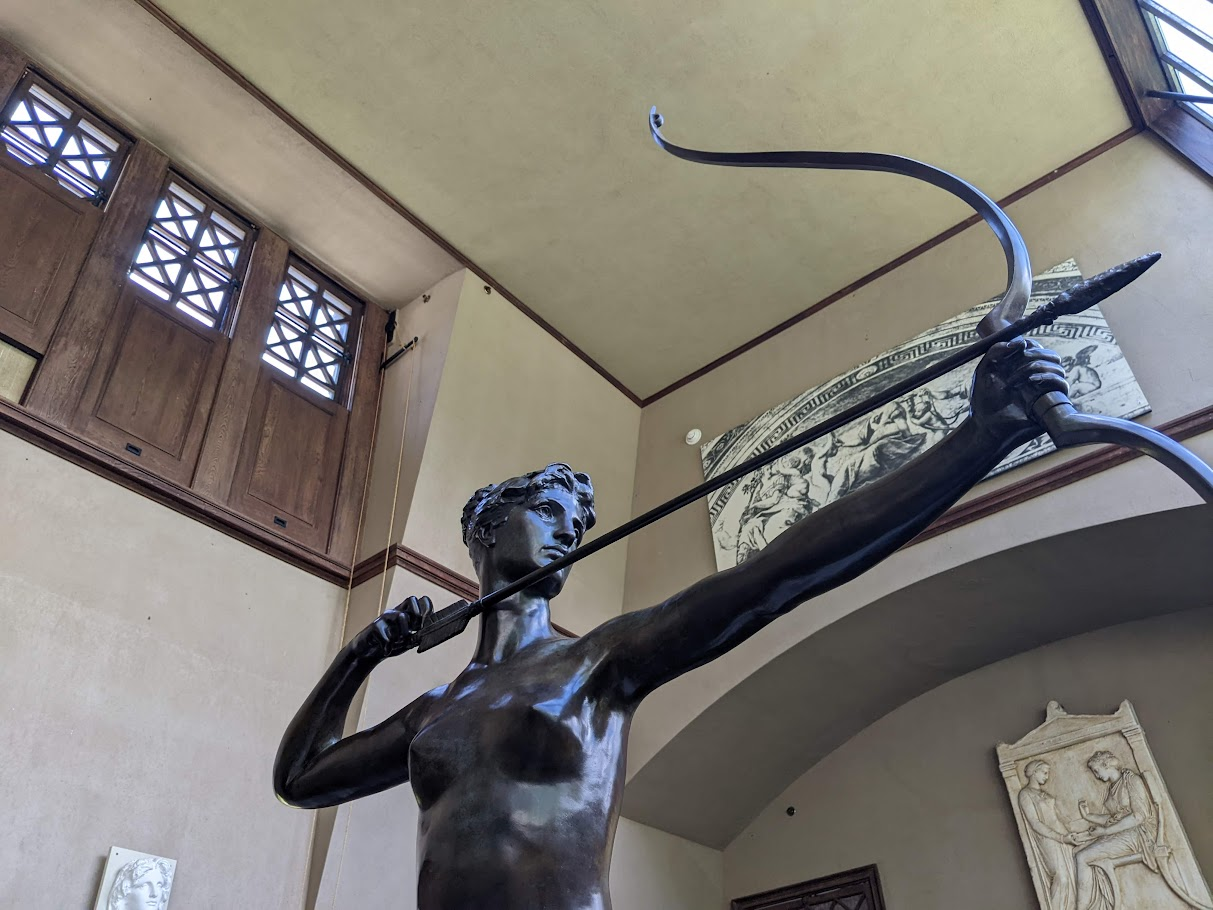
Detail of a reproduction of Diana at the Saint-Gaudens National Historical Park. New Hampshire's sole national park is one of only two dedicated to a visual artist.

In the spring, New Hampshire's many sap houses hold sugaring-off open houses. In summer and early autumn, New Hampshire is home to many county fairs, the largest being the Hopkinton State Fair, in Contoocook. New Hampshire's Lakes Region is home to many summer camps, especially around Lake Winnipesaukee, and is a popular tourist destination. The Peterborough Players have performed every summer in Peterborough since 1933. The Barnstormers Theatre in Tamworth, founded in 1931, is one of the longest-running professional summer theaters in the United States. The Saint-Gaudens National Historical Park is the sole National Park Unit in the state, and a section of the Appalachian Trail passes through the north.

In September, New Hampshire is host to the New Hampshire Highland Games. New Hampshire has also registered an official tartan with the proper authorities in Scotland, used to make kilts worn by the Lincoln Police Department while its officers serve during the games. The fall foliage peaks in mid-October. In the winter, New Hampshire's ski areas and snowmobile trails attract visitors from a wide area. After the lakes freeze over they become dotted with ice fishing ice houses, known locally as bobhouses.

Funspot, the world's largest video arcade (now termed a museum), is in Laconia.

=== In fiction ===
Many novels, plays and screenplays have been set in New Hampshire.

==== Theater ====
- The fictional New Hampshire town of Grover's Corners serves as the setting of the Thornton Wilder play Our Town. Grover's Corners is based, in part, on the real town of Peterborough. Several local landmarks and nearby towns are mentioned in the text of the play, and Wilder himself spent some time in Peterborough at the MacDowell Colony, writing at least some of the play while in residence there.

==== Comics ====
- Al Capp, creator of the comic strip Li'l Abner, used to joke that Dogpatch, the setting for the strip, was based on Seabrook, where he would vacation with his wife.

==== Television ====
Many television programs have been set in New Hampshire. Notable recent examples include:

- In the AMC drama Breaking Bad ("Granite State") series lead Walter White escapes to a cabin in a fictional county in northern New Hampshire.
- An episode of the NBC drama The West Wing takes place in the fictional Hartsfield's Landing, New Hampshire.
- In the sixth season of HBO series The Sopranos, in an episode named for New Hampshire's slogan "Live Free or Die", a character flees to the fictional town of Dartford, New Hampshire, because of inadvertently being outed as a gay man.

== Notable people ==
Prominent individuals from New Hampshire include 14th President of the United States Franklin Pierce, founding father Nicholas Gilman, Senator Daniel Webster, Revolutionary War hero John Stark, editor Horace Greeley, founder of the Christian Science religion Mary Baker Eddy, poet Robert Frost, sculptor Daniel Chester French, astronaut Alan Shepard, rock musician Ronnie James Dio, author Dan Brown, actor-comedian Adam Sandler, inventor Dean Kamen, comedians Sarah Silverman and Seth Meyers, restaurateurs Richard and Maurice McDonald, WWE wrestler Triple H, and streamer Ludwig Ahgren.

== See also ==
- Outline of New Hampshire
- Local government in New Hampshire
- List of disasters in New Hampshire by death toll
- List of states and territories of the United States
- New Hampshire Advantage

== Notes ==
| Preceded by South Carolina | List of U.S. states by date of admission to the Union; Ratified Constitution on June 21, 1788 (9th) | Succeeded by Virginia |
