= Warren H. Doane Diamond =

Stadium in Concord, New Hampshire

- Interactive map of Warren H. Doane Diamond
- Location: South Fruit Street and Industrial Drive, Concord, New Hampshire, United States
- Coordinates: 43.193356°N 71.549438°W
- Capacity: 2,000
- Surface: Natural grass
- Scoreboard: Electronic

Construction
- Opened: 1936
- Renovated: 1997–1999

Tenant
- Concord Quarry Dogs (NECBL) (2001–2007) New Hampshire Wild (EPBL) (2018–present)

Warren H. Doane Diamond at Memorial Field is a stadium located in Concord, New Hampshire. The field is named after former Concord High School and amateur baseball coach, Warren Doane. It has a capacity of about 2,000 fans, and as of 2018 is the home of the New Hampshire Wild minor league baseball team.

== History ==
The field was built in 1936, and was mainly used as a high school and amateur baseball field. It remained that way until 1996, when the Cleveland Indians were searching for a new home for their Short Season-A New York–Penn League affiliate, the Watertown Indians. The Indians organization considered the state of New Hampshire as a potential site. The Indians hoped to duplicate the success that the Montreal Expos had when they moved their New York–Penn League franchise to Burlington, Vermont in 1994. Although New Hampshire was home to two former minor league stadiums in Manchester and Nashua, the Indians felt that a renovated or brand new park in Concord would be the best fit. The Indians and the City of Concord made an agreement for the field to host three Watertown Indians games during the 1996 season. Because of heavy rains, 2 makeup games were added to the schedule as well. Between 1997 and 1999 Warren Doane led renovation efforts of the park, in the hopes that the Indians or another team might consider moving a minor league franchise there. Although the games had a very good turnout, the Indians decided to move to Niles, Ohio instead into newly constructed Eastwood Field, which held about 6,000 people.

Doane continued his quest to bring a team to Concord. Although a New York–Penn League team would at one time have fit very nicely in the park, the league was now starting to move toward $8–12 million facilities holding about 5,000 fans. Doane shifted his focus to bringing a New England Collegiate Baseball League team to Concord. The stadium's updates were finally finished in 2001 and Doane was granted a NECBL team for the 2001 season. However, Doane, now the General Manager of the newly formed Concord Quarry Dogs died of cancer just days before opening day of the team. The ballpark was named after him and his number was retired at the field.

The Quarry Dogs led the league in attendance in their inaugural year, and were near the top of the NECBL in attendance until 2004. In that season, however, attendance numbers dropped dramatically with the arrival of the New Hampshire Fisher Cats, the Double A affiliate of the Toronto Blue Jays, in nearby Manchester, New Hampshire. By the 2007 season the Diamond averaged only about 500 fans per game, which was less than half of what it averaged in the Quarry Dogs' first seasons. The team was purchased and moved to Holyoke, Massachusetts to become the Holyoke Blue Sox. In 2018, the Empire League's New Hampshire Wild relocated to Doane Diamond from Franklin Pierce University in Rindge, bringing minor league baseball back to the stadium.

== Current use ==
Today, Concord High School and the Concord American Legion baseball team use the field. In 2008, renovations began on Doane Diamond to convert the field into a softball venue. Construction was completed in 2009, and the field became the host of the Babe Ruth Softball World Series. Also in 2009, the venue hosted the New Hampshire 13U Babe Ruth state tournament won by Portsmouth Babe Ruth.
