= New Hampshire Wild =

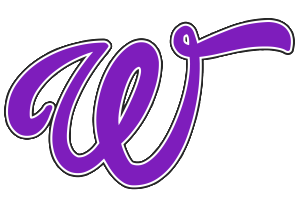
- Logo

Information
- League: Empire Professional Baseball League
- Location: Concord, New Hampshire
- Ballpark: Doane Diamond
- Founded: 2016
- Colors: Black, purple, white
- Manager: Scott Nathanson
- Website: http://wildprobaseball.com/

The New Hampshire Wild were an independent American professional baseball team based in Concord, New Hampshire. They played in the Empire Professional Baseball League, which is not affiliated with Major League Baseball.

== History ==
The team was a member of the league during the inaugural 2016 season, playing at Franklin Pierce University in Rindge. After not participating in the 2017 season, on February 23, 2018, the league announced the revival of the New Hampshire Wild. Their new home field was announced as the Warren H. Doane Diamond at Concord's Memorial Field.
