= Mount Pemigewasset =

Mountain in the U.S. state of New Hampshire

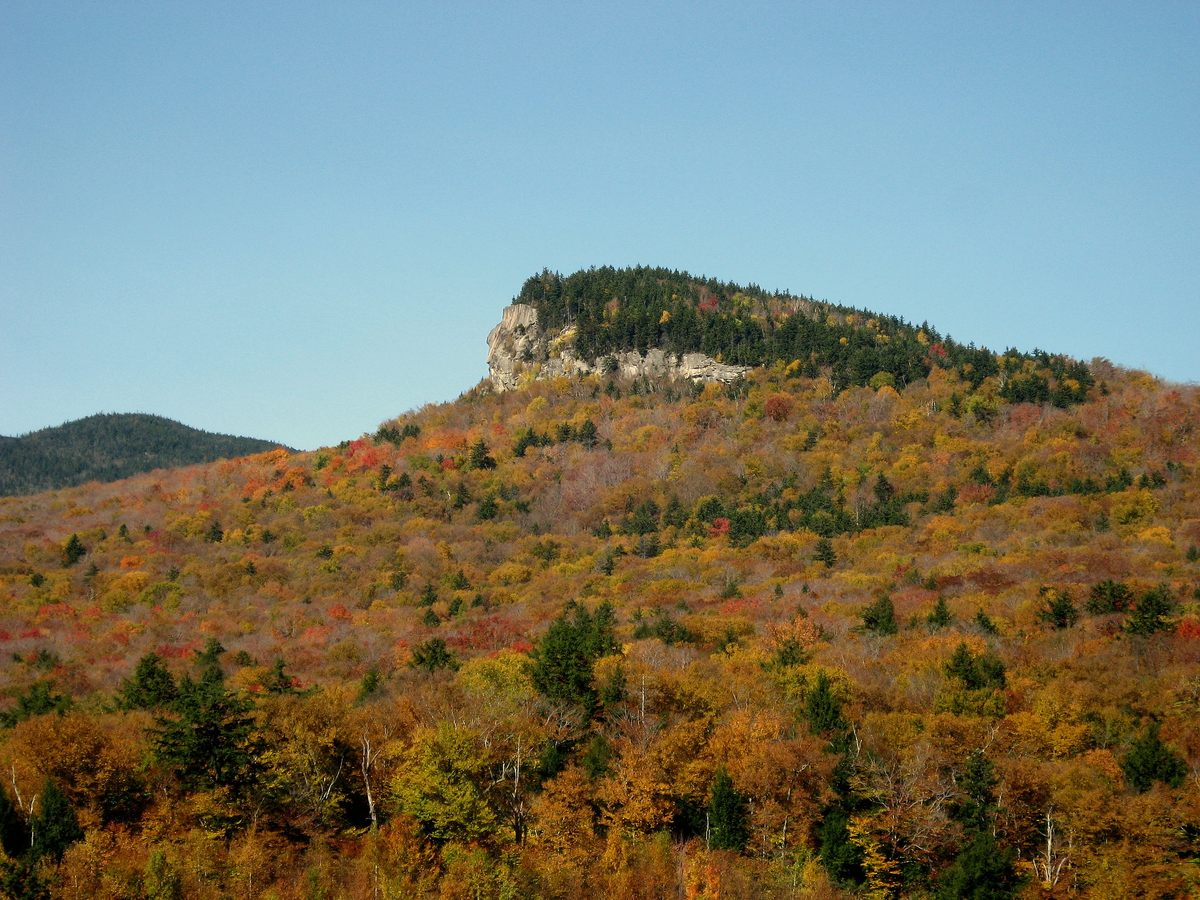
- Mount Pemigewasset with its distinct head profile

Highest point
- Elevation: 2,530 ft (770 m)
- Coordinates: 44°5′52″N 71°41′56″W

Geography
- Location within New Hampshire Location within the United States
- Location: Lincoln; Grafton County; New Hampshire, U.S.
- Parent range: Kinsman Range

Climbing
- Easiest route: Hike

Mount Pemigewasset, or Indian Head, is a mountain in Franconia Notch in the White Mountains in Grafton County, New Hampshire, United States. It lies near the town of Lincoln.

The mountain is known for the distinctive cliff along the southern side of its summit, which resembles the profile of a Native American head. Such shapes are formed when water enters cracks in the granite. Over time, the water freezes and expands, which further shapes and cracks the rock. The "face" measures 98 feet (30 m) from chin to forehead, and the mountain itself has an elevation of 2,530 feet (770 m).

The head shape has been noted since the early 19th century. It was partly hidden by trees near the chin, but a 1901 forest fire revealed the full profile. The mountain received more attention after a better-known rock formation in the White Mountains, the Old Man of the Mountain, collapsed in 2003. The "Indian Head" will eventually lose its shape as well.

Pemigewasset is an Abenaki Indian word meaning "rapidly moving", and it also names the nearby Pemigewasset River. The Native American Pemigewasset tribe lived in the area in the 17th and 18th centuries, and a legend of the Abenaki people tells that Chief Pemigewasset spied for enemies from the top of the mountain.

According to an 1898 guidebook, "The view on a moonlight night from the top of this vast cliff is awe inspiring." The Indian Head Resort, a more than one-hundred-year-old tourist facility, has a view over the mountain as well as a viewing tower.
