= Vehicle registration plates of New Hampshire =

New Hampshire vehicle license plates

New Hampshire
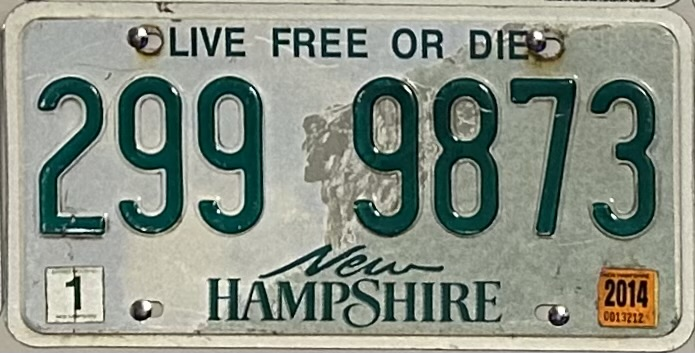

Current series
- Slogan: Live Free or Die
- Size: 12 in × 6 in 30 cm × 15 cm
- Material: Aluminum
- Serial format: 123 4567
- Introduced: January 1999

Availability
- Issued by: New Hampshire Department of Safety, Division of Motor Vehicles

History
- First issued: April 4, 1905

The U.S. state of New Hampshire first required its residents to register their motor vehicles and display license plates in 1905. As of 2026, plates are issued by the New Hampshire Department of Safety through its Division of Motor Vehicles. Front and rear plates are required for most classes of vehicles, while only rear plates are required for motorcycles and trailers.

== Passenger baseplates ==
=== 1905 to 1972 ===
In 1956, the United States, Canada, and Mexico came to an agreement with the American Association of Motor Vehicle Administrators, the Automobile Manufacturers Association and the National Safety Council that standardized the size for license plates for vehicles (except those for motorcycles) at 6 inches (15 cm) in height by 12 inches (30 cm) in width, with standardized mounting holes. The 1955 (dated 1956) issue was the first New Hampshire license plate that complied with these standards.

Image	Dates issued	Design	Slogan	Serial format	Serials issued	Notes
	1905–11	White serial on green porcelain plate; "N.H." centered at bottom	none	1234	1 to approximately 7200	
	1912	Embossed green serial on white plate; vertical "NH" and "1912" at left and right respectively	none	1234	1 to approximately 5700	
	1913	White serial on green porcelain plate; vertical "NH" and "1913" at left and right respectively	none	1234	1000 to approximately 7800	
	1914	White serial on green porcelain plate; vertical "NH" and "1914" at left and right respectively	none	1234	1000 to approximately 9700	
	1915	Green serial on white porcelain plate; "N. H." and "1915" centered at top and bottom respectively	none	12345	1000 to approximately 13500	
	1916	White serial on green porcelain plate; vertical "NH" and "1916" at left and right respectively	none	12345	1 to approximately 17600	
	1917	Green serial on white porcelain plate; "N. H." and "1917" centered at top and bottom respectively	none	12345	100 to approximately 23100	
	1918	White serial on green porcelain plate; "N H" and "1918" centered at top and bottom respectively	none	12345	100 to approximately 24700	Some later plates manufactured on fiberboard.
	1919	Dark green serial on white flat metal plate; "N H" and "1919" centered at top and bottom respectively	none	12345	100 to approximately 30000	
	1920	White serial on dark green flat metal plate; "N H" and "1920" centered at top and bottom respectively	none	12345	100 to approximately 35000	
	1921	Dark green serial on white flat metal plate; "N H" and "1921" centered at top and bottom respectively	none	12345	100 to approximately 42500	
	1922	Embossed white serial on dark green plate with border line; "N.H. 1922" centered at bottom	none	12345	100 to approximately 48500	
	1923	Embossed dark green serial on white plate with border line; "N H" and "1923" centered at top and bottom respectively	none	12.345	100 to approximately 60.000	
	1924	Embossed white serial on dark green plate with border line; "N H" and "1924" centered at top and bottom respectively	none	12-345	100 to approximately 72-000	
	1925	Embossed dark green serial on white plate with border line; "N H" and "1925" centered at top and bottom respectively	none	12-345	100 to approximately 81-000	
	1926	Embossed white serial on dark green plate with border line; embossed white Old Man of the Mountain graphic at left; "N H" and "1926" centered at top and bottom respectively	none	12-345	100 to approximately 89-000	
	1927	Embossed dark green serial on white plate with border line; "N H" and "1927" centered at top and bottom respectively	none	12-345	100 to approximately 95-000	
	1928	Embossed white serial on green plate with border line; "NH-28" centered at top	none	123-456	100 to approximately 103-000	
	1929	Embossed green serial on white plate with border line; "NH-29" centered at top	none	123-456	1 to approximately 109-000	
	1930	As 1928 base, but with "NH-30" at top	none	123-456	100 to approximately 111-000	
	1931	As 1929 base, but with "NH-31" at top	none	123-456	100 to approximately 112-000	
	1932	As 1928 base, but with "NH-32" at top	none	123-456	100 to approximately 107-000	
	1933	As 1929 base, but with "NH-33" at top	none	123-456	100 to approximately 107-000	
	1934	As 1928 base, but with "NH-34" at top	none	12-345	100 to approximately 91-000	
	1935	As 1929 base, but with "NH-35" at top	none	12-345	100 to approximately 94-000	
	1936	As 1928 base, but with "NH-36" at top	none	12-345	100 to approximately 97-000	
	1937	As 1929 base, but with "NH-37" at top	none	123-456	100 to approximately 101-000	
	1938–39	As 1928 base, but with "NH-38-9" at top	none	12-345	100 to approximately 98-000	
	1939–40	As 1929 base, but with "NH-39-40" at top	none	123-456	100 to approximately 104-000	
	1940–41	As 1928 base, but with "NH-40-41" at top	none	123-456	100 to approximately 108-000	
	1941–42	As 1929 base, but with "NH-41-42" at top	none	123-456	100 to approximately 110-000	
	1942–44	As 1928 base, but with "NH-42-43" at top	none	123-456	100 to approximately 104-000	Revalidated through March 31, 1944, with white rectangular tabs, due to metal conservation for World War II.
	1944	As 1929 base, but with "NH 44" at top	none	12-345	1 to approximately 89-000	
	1945	Embossed black serial on white plate with border line; "NH 45" centered at top	none	12-345	1 to approximately 98-000	
	1946	Embossed white serial on black plate with border line; "NH 46" centered at top	none	12-345; 123456	1 to approximately 109000	
	1947	As 1945 base, but with "NH 47" at top	none	12-345; 123456	1 to approximately 114000	
	1948	As 1946 base, but with "NH - 48" at top	none	12-345; 123456	1 to approximately 120000	
	1949	Embossed forest green serial on white plate with border line; "NH - 49" centered at top	none	A/B123	County-coded	
	1950	Embossed white serial on forest green plate with border line; "NH - 50" centered at top	none	A/B123	County-coded	
	1951	As 1949 base, but with "NH - 51" at top	none	A/B123	County-coded	
	1952	As 1950 base, but with "NH - 52" at top	none	A/B123	County-coded	
	1953	As 1949 base, but with "NH - 53" at top	none	A/B123	County-coded	
	1954	Embossed white serial on forest green plate with border line; "NEW HAMPSHIRE" at bottom; "1954" centered at top	none	AB123	County-coded	First use of the full state name.
	1955	Embossed forest green serial on white plate with border line; "NEW HAMPSHIRE" at bottom; "1955" centered at top	none	AB123	County-coded	
	1956	Embossed white serial on forest green plate with border line; "NEW HAMPSHIRE" at bottom; "1956" centered at top	none	AB123	County-coded	First 6" x 12" plate.
	1957	Embossed forest green serial on white plate with border line; "NEW HAMPSHIRE" at bottom; "19" at top left and "57" at top right	"SCENIC" centered at top	AB123	County-coded	
	1958	Embossed white serial on forest green plate with border line; "NEW HAMPSHIRE" at bottom; "19" at top left and "58" at top right	"SCENIC" centered at top	AB123	County-coded	
	1959	As 1957 base, but with "59" at top right	"SCENIC" as on 1957 base	AB123	County-coded	
	1960	As 1958 base, but with "60" at top right	"SCENIC" as on 1958 base	AB123	County-coded	
	1961	As 1957 base, but with "61" at top right	"SCENIC" as on 1957 base	AB123	County-coded	
	1962	As 1958 base, but with "62" at top right	"SCENIC" as on 1958 base	AB123	County-coded	
	1963	As 1957 base, but without border line, and with "63" at top right	"PHOTOSCENIC" centered at top	AB123	County-coded	
	1964	As 1958 base, but with "64" at top right	"SCENIC" as on 1958 base	AB123	County-coded	
	1965	As 1957 base, but with "65" at top right	"SCENIC" as on 1957 base	AB123	County-coded	
	1966	As 1958 base, but with "66" at top right	"SCENIC" as on 1958 base	AB123	County-coded	
	1967	As 1957 base, but with "67" at top right	"SCENIC" as on 1957 base	AB123	County-coded	
	1968	As 1958 base, but with "68" at top right	"SCENIC" as on 1958 base	AB123	County-coded	
	1969	As 1957 base, but with "69" at top right	"SCENIC" as on 1957 base	AB123	County-coded	
	1970	As 1958 base, but with "70" at top right	"SCENIC" as on 1958 base	AB123	County-coded	
	1971	As 1957 base, but with "71" at top right	"LIVE FREE OR DIE" centered at top	AB123	County-coded	First use of the state motto on regular passenger plates. The motto had first been used on vanity plates on the 1970 base.
	1972	As 1958 base, but with "72" at top right	"LIVE FREE OR DIE" centered at top	AB123	County-coded	

=== 1973 to present ===
In 1977, the U.S. Supreme Court ruled that vehicle owners may cover up the mottos that a state places on its license plates. The case began in 1974 when George Maynard, a Jehovah's Witness from Claremont, New Hampshire, and his wife taped over the "Live Free or Die" motto on their plates. Maynard, who argued that the motto violated his religious beliefs, subsequently spent 15 days in jail for refusing to pay the $75 fine imposed for covering up the motto (equivalent to $490 in 2025). Chief Justice Warren E. Burger stated, "The First Amendment protects the right of individuals to hold a point of view different from the majority and to refuse to foster, in the way New Hampshire commands, an idea they find morally objectionable."

Image	Dates issued	Design	Slogan	Serial format	Serials issued	Notes
	1973–74	Embossed forest green serial on white plate with border line; "NEW HAMPSHIRE" at bottom; "73" at top right	"LIVE FREE OR DIE" centered at top	AB123; A/B1234	County-coded	Revalidated for 1974 with stickers. Four-digit serials with stacked county codes introduced in counties that had exhausted their three-digit allocations.
	1975–76	Embossed white serial on forest green plate with border line; "NEW HAMPSHIRE" at bottom; "75" at top left	"LIVE FREE OR DIE" centered at top	AB123; A/B1234	County-coded	Monthly staggered registration introduced, with each plate expiring in the same month as the registrant's birthday.
	1977	Embossed white serial on forest green plate with border line; "NEW HAMPSHIRE" at bottom; "75" at top left	"LIVE FREE OR DIE" centered at top	AB123; AB1234	County-coded	Narrow dies introduced, allowing for six-character serials with full-size county code letters.
	December 1977 – July; 1978	Embossed red serial on white plate with border line; "NEW HAMPSHIRE" at bottom	"LIVE FREE OR DIE" centered at top	XB1234	XA1 to XF9999	Interim plates issued only to new registrants. Elements changed from red to green in response to concerns of confusion with Massachusetts plates of the time; unissued red plates were recalled and repainted accordingly before issue.
	July 1978 – December 1978	As above, but with elements in green rather than red	"LIVE FREE OR DIE" centered at top	XB1234	XG1 to approximately XN7000	Interim plates issued only to new registrants. Elements changed from red to green in response to concerns of confusion with Massachusetts plates of the time; unissued red plates were recalled and repainted accordingly before issue.
	January 1979 – December 1983	Embossed forest green serial on reflective white plate with border line; "NEW HAMPSHIRE" centered at bottom	"LIVE FREE OR DIE" centered at top	123456	1 to 999999	
	December 1983 – December 1986	Embossed forest green serial on reflective white plate with border line; "NEW HAMPSHIRE" centered at bottom	"LIVE FREE OR DIE" centered at top	12345A	10000A to approximately 59000G	
	January 1987 – March 1989	Embossed forest green serial on reflective white plate; "NEW HAMPSHIRE" screened in pale green centered at top, with a graphic of the Old Man of the Mountain in a circle between the two words	"Live Free or Die" screened in pale green centered at bottom	123456	1 to 999999	
	March 1989 – December 1998	As above, but with dark green serial, state name and graphic	"LIVE FREE OR DIE" screened in dark green centered at bottom	ABC-123	AAA-001 to approximately DEX-500	
	January 1999 – present	Embossed dark green serial on reflective graphic plate with Old Man of the Mountain and Cannon Mountain against pale blue sky; screened dark green "New HAMPSHIRE" centered at bottom, with cursive "New" above serifed "HAMPSHIRE"	"LIVE FREE OR DIE" screened in dark green centered at top	12345	1 to 99999	Old Man graphic at right (also the style for vanity plates).
	January 1999 – present	Embossed dark green serial on reflective graphic plate with Old Man of the Mountain and Cannon Mountain against pale blue sky; screened dark green "New HAMPSHIRE" centered at bottom, with cursive "New" above serifed "HAMPSHIRE"	"LIVE FREE OR DIE" screened in dark green centered at top	123 456	999 999 to 100 000	Serials progressed backwards. Old Man graphic in center.
	January 1999 – present	Embossed dark green serial on reflective graphic plate with Old Man of the Mountain and Cannon Mountain against pale blue sky; screened dark green "New HAMPSHIRE" centered at bottom, with cursive "New" above serifed "HAMPSHIRE"	"LIVE FREE OR DIE" screened in dark green centered at top	123 4567	100 0000 to 553 8164(as of January 17, 2025)	Old Man graphic slightly to left of center.
	January 1999 – present	Embossed dark green serial on reflective graphic plate with Old Man of the Mountain and Cannon Mountain against pale blue sky; screened dark green "New HAMPSHIRE" centered at bottom, with cursive "New" above serifed "HAMPSHIRE"	"LIVE FREE OR DIE" screened in dark green centered at top	D1234	D1000 to unknown	Old man graphic at right. Empty 3"x3" square at left for placement of a decal purchased separately from a legislatively approved organization or charity.

Specialty Plates
Image	Dates issued	Design	Slogan	Serial format	Serials issued	Notes
	1999–Present	Embossed dark green serial with moose graphic on left and mountain graphic in background; screened dark green "New HAMPSHIRE" centered at bottom, with cursive "New" above serifed "HAMPSHIRE"; "C/H" screened in green to the left of serial	"LIVE FREE OR DIE" screened in dark green centered at top	C/H1234X C/H123X4 C/H12X34 C/H1X234 C/HX1234	C/H1000C to C/H C9999 C/H1000H to C/H H9999 C/H1000P to C/H P9999 C/H1000M to C/H 5M117 (as of December 17, 2024)	Progresses through each format with a single letter, then switches to a new letter C, H, P, M, W used so far $30 a year cost
	2013–Present	As Moose/Conservation plate with NH state parks logo on right	"LIVE FREE OR DIE" screened in dark green centered at top	123A	100A to 217E (as of December 9, 2024)	$115 a year cost, gives free access to state parks
	2012–Present	As current passenger base, with Old Man of the Mountain graphic at right and NH state parks logo screened on left	"LIVE FREE OR DIE" screened in dark green centered at top	123456	100000 to approximately 105000 and reused 2000 passenger serials	$85 a year cost, gives free access to state parks

Veteran Plates
Image	Dates issued	Design	Slogan	Serial format	Serials issued	Notes
	1999–Present	Embossed blue serial on white plate with American flag screened in blue left of serial "NEW HAMPSHIRE" screened in blue on bottom and "VETERAN" screened in red on top	"LIVE FREE OR DIE" screened in blue centered at top	V12345	V 1 to V73125 (as of October 16, 2024)	
	1999–Present	As standard veteran plate with "DISABLED VETERAN" screened in red on top and wheelchair symbol screened in blue on right	"LIVE FREE OR DIE" screened in blue centered at top	1234	1 to 5786 (as of November 19, 2024)	
	2012–Present	As standard veteran plate with "NATIONAL GUARD" screened in red on top and blue colonial soldier screened in blue on right	"LIVE FREE OR DIE" screened in blue centered at top	1234	1000 to 2081 (as of September 14, 2014)	

== County coding ==
From 1949 to 1979, passenger plates in New Hampshire featured a two-letter code indicating the county in which the vehicle was registered, as follows:

=== County code allocations ===
County	Letter blocks
Belknap	BA–BZ
Carroll	CA–CZ
Cheshire	EA–EZ, ZA–ZH (from 1972)
Coös	OA–OZ
Grafton	GA–GZ
Hillsborough	HA–HZ, LA–LZ, IA–IZ (from 1959), JA–JZ (from 1968)
Merrimack	MA–MZ, NA–NZ (from 1967)
Rockingham	RA–RZ, KA–KZ (from 1955), PA–PZ (from 1968)
Strafford	FA–FZ, DA–DZ (from 1970)
Sullivan	SA–SZ

=== Alphabetical cross-reference ===
Letter blocks	County
BA–BZ	Belknap
CA–CZ	Carroll
DA–DZ	Strafford
EA–EZ	Cheshire
FA–FZ	Strafford
GA–GZ	Grafton
HA–HZ	Hillsborough
IA–IZ	Hillsborough
JA–JZ	Hillsborough
KA–KZ	Rockingham
LA–LZ	Hillsborough
MA–MZ	Merrimack
NA–NZ	Merrimack
OA–OZ	Coös
PA–PZ	Rockingham
RA–RZ	Rockingham
SA–SZ	Sullivan
ZA–ZH	Cheshire

In addition, XA–XN were used on interim plates issued to new registrants between December 1977 and December 1978, while the serial AC 000 was and still is used on sample plates.

== Non-passenger plates ==
Image	Type	Dates issued	Design	Slogan	Serial format	Serials issued	Notes
	Commercial	1988–89	As 1987–89 passenger base	"Live Free or Die" centered at bottom	AB1234	AA0001 to approximately AB9999	Possibly discontinued 2007.
	Commercial	1989–present	As 1989–98 passenger base	"LIVE FREE OR DIE" centered at bottom	AB1234	AC0001 to approximately AE8800	Possibly discontinued 2007.
	Construction Equipment	1999–present	As current passenger base, with Old Man of the Mountain graphic at right; "CONSTRUCT EQUIP" screened vertically over graphic	"LIVE FREE OR DIE" centered at top	C/E12345	C/E00001 to C/E35959 (as of September 18, 2024)	
	Disabled	1989–present	As 1989–98 passenger base, with wheelchair symbol at left	"LIVE FREE OR DIE" centered at bottom	1234	1000 to 9999	
	Disabled	1989–present	As 1989–98 passenger base, with wheelchair symbol at left	"LIVE FREE OR DIE" centered at bottom	123A	100A to 999Z	
	Disabled	1989–present	As 1989–98 passenger base, with wheelchair symbol at left	"LIVE FREE OR DIE" centered at bottom	A123	A100 to Z999	
	Disabled	1989–present	As 1989–98 passenger base, with wheelchair symbol at left	"LIVE FREE OR DIE" centered at bottom	1A23	1A00 to 9G99 (as of March 2025)	
	Municipal Government	1989–present	As 1989–98 passenger base	"LIVE FREE OR DIE" centered at bottom	G12345	G10000 to G30914 (as of September 18, 2024)	
	Municipal Police	1999–present	Embossed blue serial on white and blue plate; "MUNICIPAL POLICE" screened at bottom; "M/P" Screened on left	"LIVE FREE OR DIE" centered at top	xxx 12		xxx - department code 12 - vehicle number
	Motorcycle	1987–94	Embossed green serial on white plate with border line; green Old Man of the Mountain graphic screened at top left with 'N' and 'H' on either side; "MOTORCYCLE" screened at bottom	none	12345	1 to 99999	
	Motorcycle	1994–2004	Embossed green serial on white plate with border line; green Old Man of the Mountain graphic screened at top left with 'N' and 'H' on either side; "MOTORCYCLE" screened at bottom	none	1234A	1000A to approximately 2000T	
	Motorcycle	2004–08	As above, but without border line	none	1234A	2001T to 9999Z	
	Motorcycle	2008–2022	As above, but without border line	none	A1234	A1000 to Z9999	
	Motorcycle	2022–Present	As above, but without border line	none	1A234	1A000 to 1H885 (as of October 12, 2024)	
	Trailer	? to 2004	As 1989–98 passenger base	"LIVE FREE OR DIE" centered at bottom	TB1234	TA0001 to TZ9999	
	Trailer	2004–present	As 1989–98 passenger base	"LIVE FREE OR DIE" centered at bottom	T123456	T100000 to T792323 (as of January 23, 2025)	Same serial dies as current passenger base.

== Gallery ==
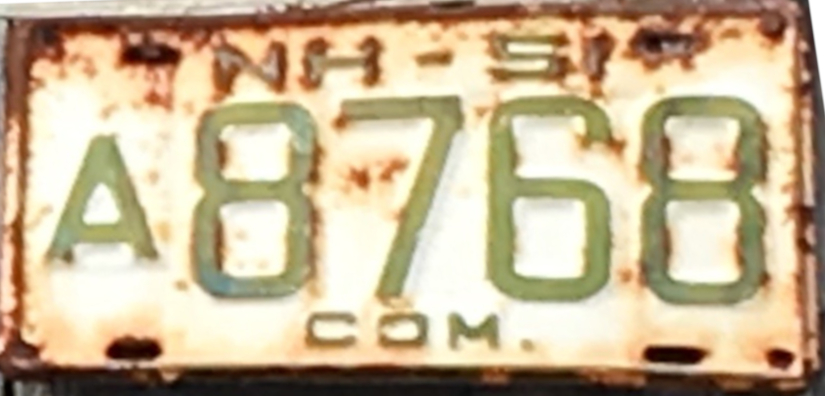
1951 commercial plate

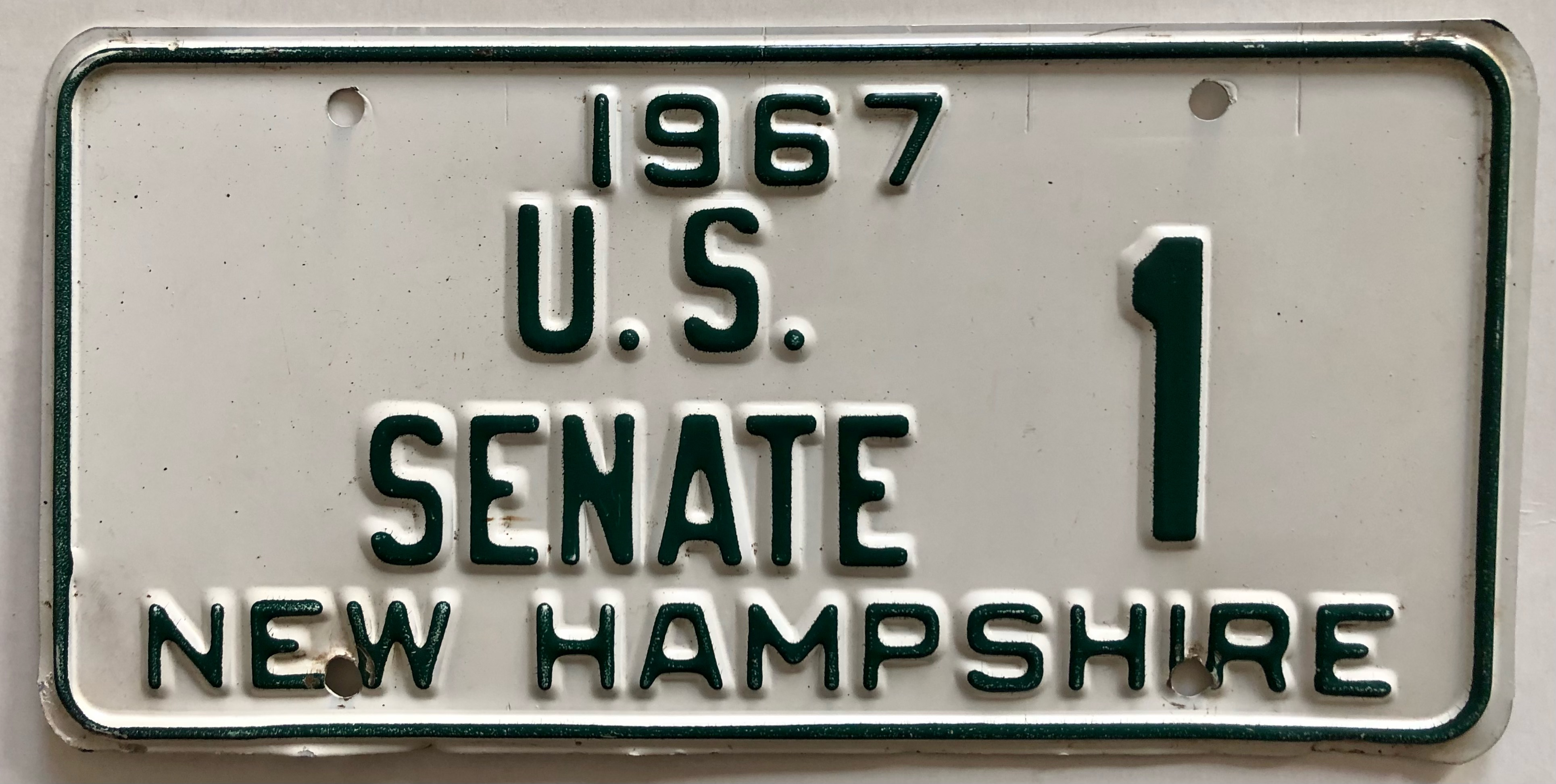
1967 U.S. Senate plate
