= Lonesome Lake (New Hampshire) =

Lake in New Hampshire, United States

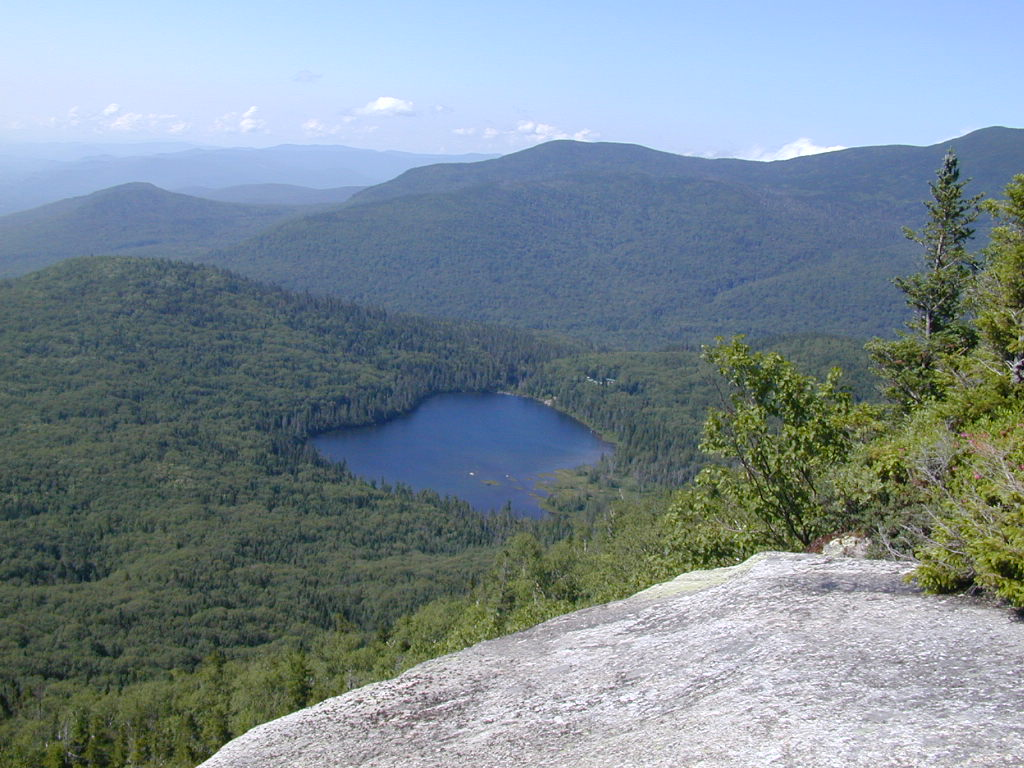
- Lonesome Lake from Cannon Mountain

- Location within New Hampshire Location within the United States
- Location: Franconia Notch State Park, Grafton County, New Hampshire
- Coordinates: 44°8′24″N 71°42′4″W
- Primary outflows: Cascade Brook
- Basin countries: United States
- Max. length: 0.2 mi (0.32 km)
- Max. width: 0.1 mi (0.16 km)
- Surface area: 12.2 acres (49,000 m^{2})
- Average depth: 4 feet (1.2 m)
- Max. depth: 8 feet (2.4 m)
- Surface elevation: 2,730 ft (830 m)

Lonesome Lake is a 12.2-acre (49,000 m^{2}) water body located in Franconia Notch in the White Mountains of New Hampshire, south of Cannon Mountain. The lake is reachable by hiking trails from the Franconia Notch Parkway, including the Lafayette Place Campground, and takes approximately 2–3 hours. It features an Appalachian Mountain Club hut, which first opened in 1930, on its southwest shore.

The lake lies in the Merrimack River watershed. Its outlet, Cascade Brook, flows south over ledges and waterfalls to the Pemigewasset River near "The Basin" in Franconia Notch. The Pemigewasset in turn flows south to the Merrimack River, which reaches the Atlantic Ocean at Newburyport, Massachusetts.

Lonesome Lake is part of Franconia Notch State Park. The Appalachian Trail passes the lake at its outlet. Additional hiking trails travel north to Cannon Mountain.

The lake is classified as a coldwater fishery and contains brook trout. The forest includes beech, maple, and birch trees, as well as moss and lichen.

== See also ==
- List of lakes in New Hampshire
