= Franconia Notch State Park =

State park in New Hampshire, United States

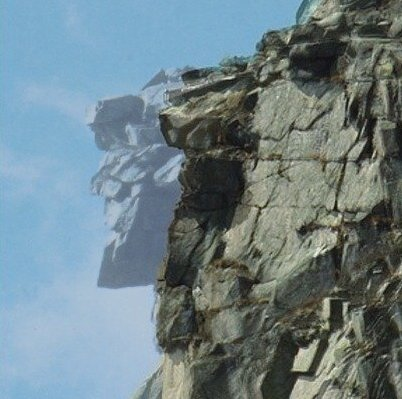
- A composite image of the Franconia Notch State Park's famous Old Man of the Mountain, created from images taken before and after its collapse

- Location within New Hampshire
- Interactive map of Franconia Notch State Park
- Location: Lincoln and Franconia, Grafton County, New Hampshire, United States
- Coordinates: 44°08′58″N 71°41′12″W
- Area: 6,692.8 acres (2,708.5 ha)
- Elevation: 2,067 feet (630 m)
- Established: 1928
- Administrator: New Hampshire Division of Parks and Recreation
- Website: Official website
- New Hampshire State Parks

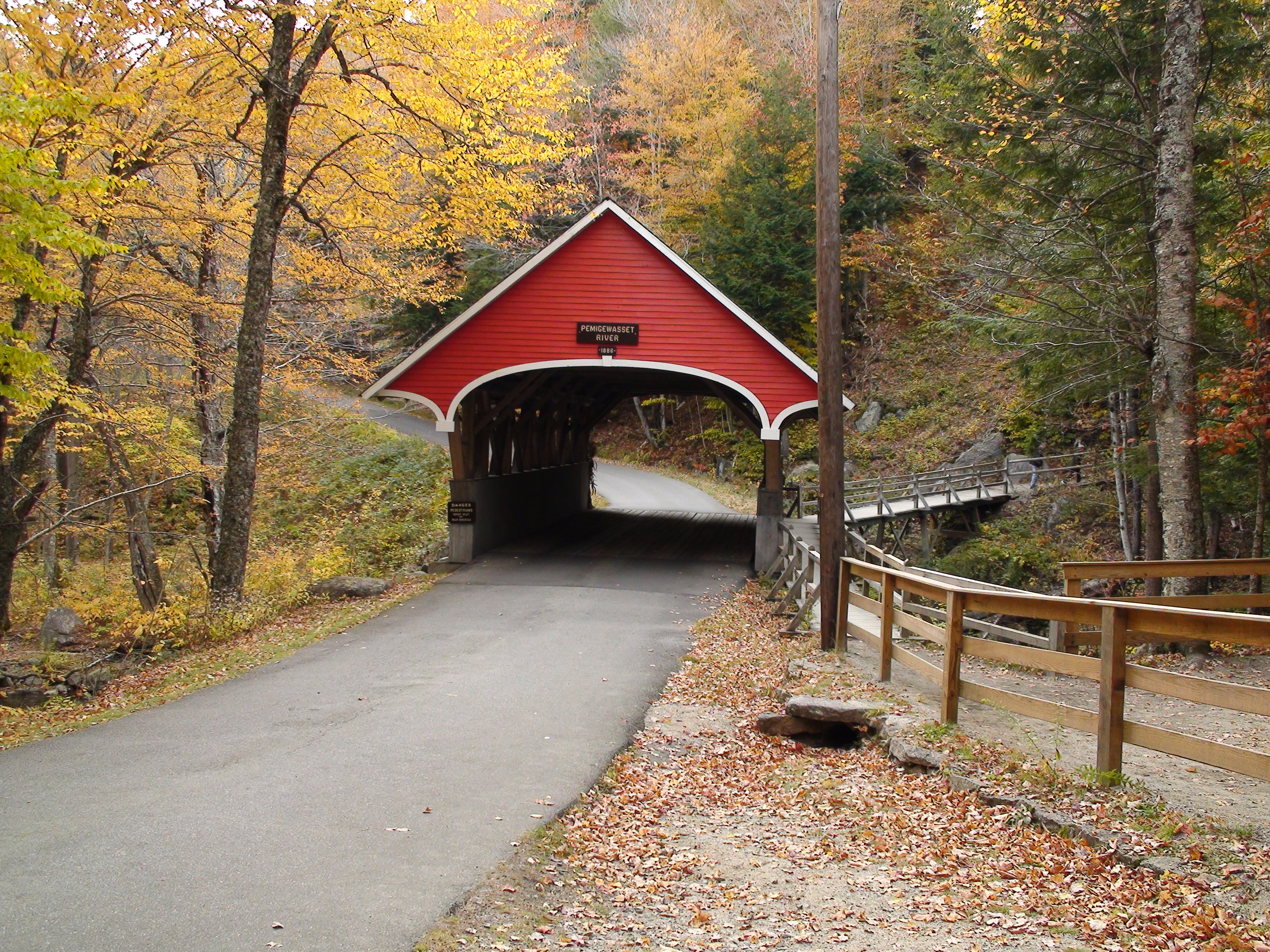
Covered bridge near the Flume

A hiking trail through Franconia Notch

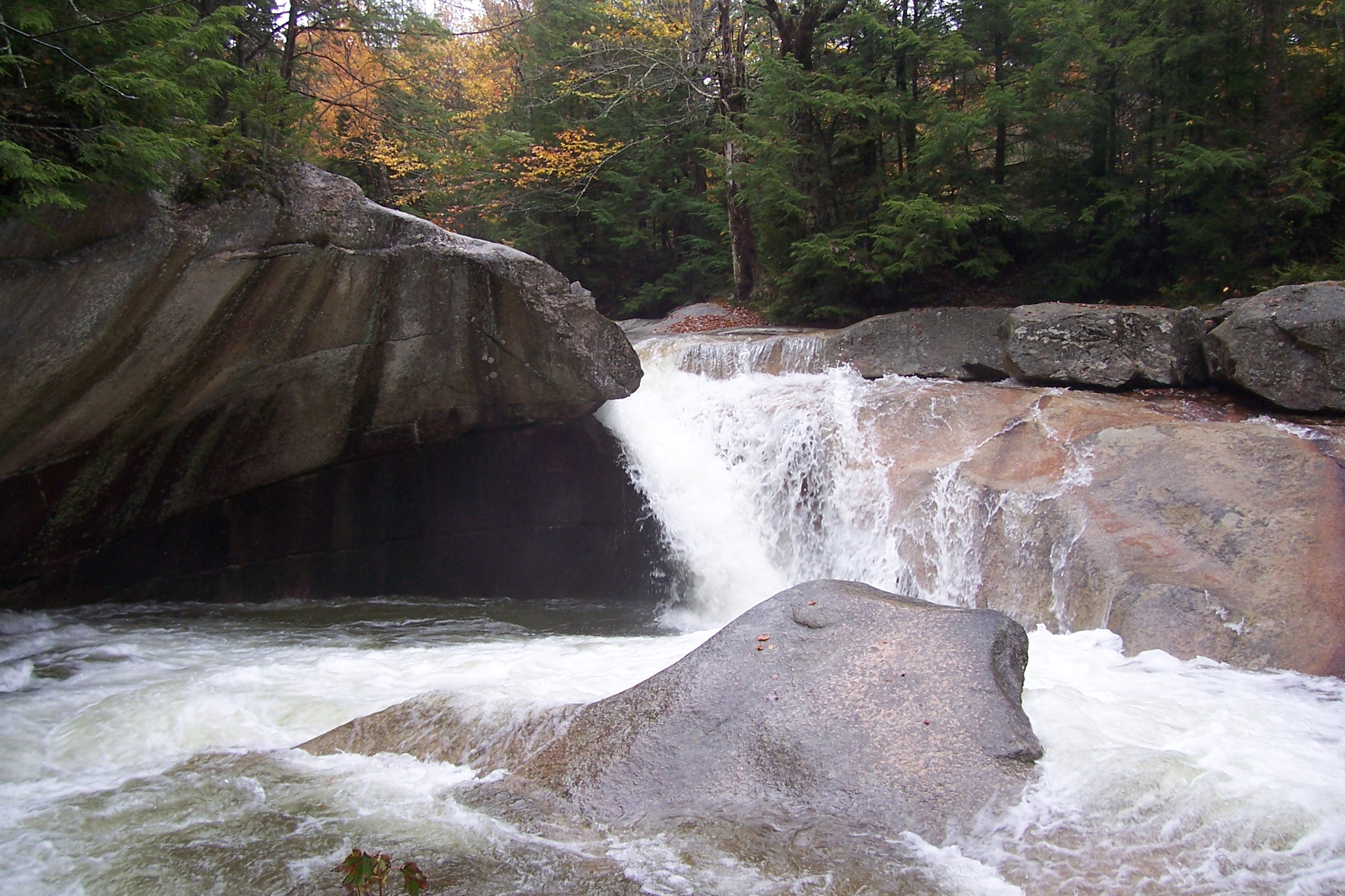
The Basin

Franconia Notch State Park is a public recreation area and nature preserve that straddles eight miles (13 km) of Interstate 93 as it passes through Franconia Notch, a mountain pass between the Kinsman Range and Franconia Range in the White Mountains of northern New Hampshire, United States. The northern part of the park, including Cannon Mountain and Echo and Profile lakes, is in the town of Franconia, and the southern part, including Lonesome Lake and the Flume, is in Lincoln. Attractions in the state park include the Flume Gorge and visitor center, the Old Man of the Mountain historical site, fishing in Echo Lake and Profile Lake, and miles of hiking, biking and ski trails.

The park is home to Cannon Mountain, a state-owned ski resort started in the 1930s. The mountain is named for a rock formation in the shape of a cannon found on the summit, but the "Old Man of the Mountain" formation was by far the more famous; it collapsed in May 2003. Cannon is also famous for being one of the most challenging hills in New England. It boasts an aerial tram, which runs year-round, ferrying sightseers to the summit in the summer time and skiers in the winter. At the base of the tramway is the New England Ski Museum, with exhibits on the history of alpine skiing in New England and America.

On the west side of the notch, halfway up the side of Cannon Mountain, is Lonesome Lake, an easy day hike up the Lonesome Lake Trail from the state park's Lafayette Place campground. The Lonesome Lake Hut, one of numerous well-kept huts throughout the White Mountains that are maintained by the Appalachian Mountain Club, is found at the southwest end of the lake, near its outlet. Huts offer meals and lodging (reservations are recommended).

Opposite Cannon Mountain, on the east side of the notch, are the Eagle Cliffs, so named for the eagles that sometimes roost there. The Greenleaf Trail, a hiking trail, winds around the south side of the cliff and up to Greenleaf Hut, another AMC hut. East of Greenleaf Hut and outside the state park is the 5,249-foot (1,600 m) summit of Mount Lafayette and the Franconia Ridge Trail (also the Appalachian Trail). The Appalachian Trail continues north to Mount Washington and eventually to Mount Katahdin in Maine.

Beneath a waterfall in the Pemigewasset River is a granite pothole about 20 feet (6 m) across known simply as "the Basin". It was scrubbed out by stones dragged (and eventually deposited) by the retreating North American ice sheet, and since made smooth by 15 millennia of rapidly whirling pebbles and grit. Below the Basin is "Old Man's Foot", a distinctively shaped rock formation, also the natural result of Pemigewasset's erosive energy.

== See also ==
- Profile House
- List of mountain passes in New Hampshire
