= New Hampshire Advantage =

Political and economic slogan

- Formation: 1992
- Founder: Steve Merrill
- Founded at: New Hampshire
- Type: Political and economic slogan
- Purpose: Promotion of low taxes, limited government, and individual liberty
- Location: New Hampshire, United States
- Methods: Tax policy, regulatory reform, economic development
- Fields: Economics, politics, public policy

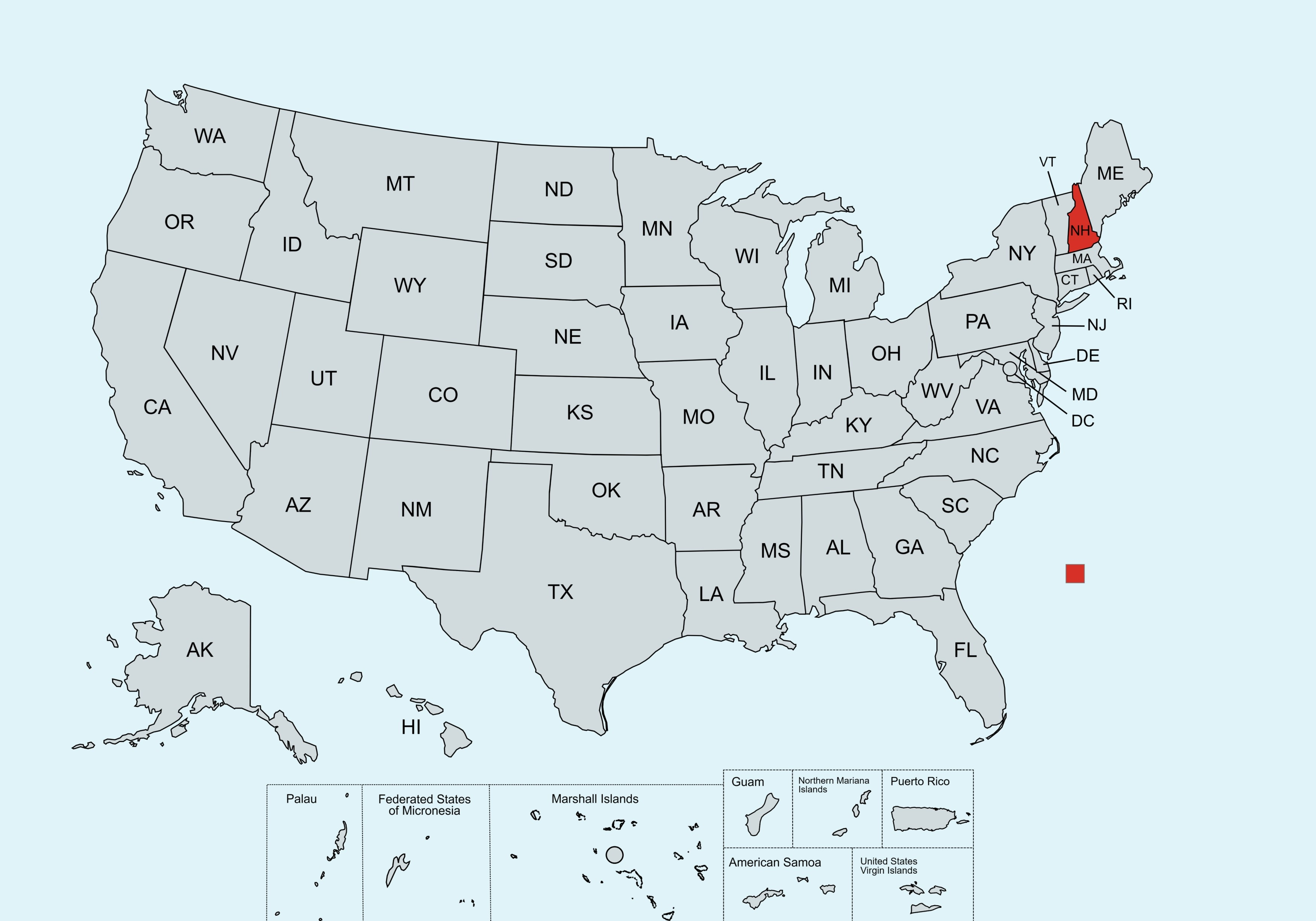
Locator map of New Hampshire, United States, highlighting the state's position within the country.

The New Hampshire Advantage is a political and economic slogan used to describe the perceived benefits of living and doing business in the U.S. state of New Hampshire. The phrase was coined by Steve Merrill and his campaign team during his successful 1992 campaign for governor of New Hampshire. It later became a shorthand for the state's political identity, emphasizing the state's lack of an income tax, sales tax, limited government regulation, and acknowledgment of individual freedom.

== Origin and definition ==
The phrase was first used by Steve Merrill and his campaign team as a tagline during the 1992 Republican gubernatorial primary. Merrill used it as a campaign tagline and won the election. It subsequently became a widely used slogan for the state's political and economic philosophy. After Merrill's death in 2020, Chris Sununu, then governor, stated that Merrill "coined the term 'New Hampshire Advantage', in reference to a belief in local control, low taxes and a spirit of individuality."

The term generally refers to the state's deliberate policy choices, including:

- No general income tax on wages and salaries
- No general sales tax
- Limited regulation
- Individual liberties as reflected in the state motto, "Live Free or Die"

It also embodies a broader cultural ethos of self-reliance and economic freedom.

== Economic policy ==
The New Hampshire Advantage is most closely associated with the state's tax structure. Unlike most U.S. states, New Hampshire does not levy a general sales tax or a income tax. In 2020, the state filed a lawsuit against Massachusetts, arguing that Massachusetts' tax on remote workers during the COVID-19 pandemic infringed upon New Hampshire's sovereignty. The state stated this was a "deliberate policy choice to reject a broad-based personal earned income tax or a general sales tax."

The Business and Industry Association of New Hampshire, the state's largest business lobby, defines the New Hampshire Advantage as "low taxes, limited regulation, and a predictable fiscal climate." The association opposes any new income or sales tax as well as increases to the Business Enterprise Tax or Business Profits Tax.

=== Tax revenue structure ===
Because New Hampshire lacks broad-based income and sales taxes, municipalities rely heavily on property taxes to fund local services, including education. The New Hampshire Fiscal Policy Institute has noted that property taxes account for 61% of the total state and local tax revenue.

=== Energy ===
Some proponents have extended the New Hampshire Advantage concept beyond tax policy to include energy. At a 2026 panel discussion, Americans for Prosperity Northeast Regional Director Ross Connolly argued that Seabrook Station Nuclear Power Plant represented a key competitive advantage for New Hampshire. He stated it "powers half of the businesses and homes in the Granite state" and contrasted New Hampshire's energy position with that of neighboring states. He noted that the Vermont Yankee Nuclear Power Plant went offline in 2014 after having produced nearly 72% of that state's in-state electricity generation.

== Business climate ==
Proponents argue that the New Hampshire Advantage has helped the state attract businesses and residents from higher-tax neighboring states, particularly Massachusetts. In 2024, U.S. News & World Report ranked New Hampshire first for economic opportunity and the second best state overall. In 2023, the state was ranked as the second-best state for business in the nation by the same publication.

The state has also seen growth in foreign direct investment. According to a 2022 report by Plymouth State University, New Hampshire outperformed the national average in employment from foreign companies, with foreign subsidiaries employing 50,700 people, or 8% of the state's private-sector employment, compared to the national average of 6%. Canada, the United Kingdom, Switzerland, Japan, and Germany were the leading sources of foreign investment in the state.

Supporters still point to workforce shortages and the difficulty in retaining youth, educated residents. In 2016, economist Ross Gittell argued that positive net migration had stopped, the "legacy New Hampshire Advantage ended," and the state must focus on developing its own workforce.

== Criticism ==
Critics contend that the New Hampshire Advantage is exaggerated or even misleading. In a 2025 column, journalist Michael Kitch argued that the state's economic growth is largely due to its proximity to the Greater Boston metropolitan area rather than its tax structure. He noted that from 1930 until 1981, New Hampshire's per capita income lagged the national average, and it was only after Greater Boston became a major economic hub that New Hampshire's fortunes improved.

Other critics point to the regressive nature of the state's reliance on property taxes, which disproportionately burden retirees and lower-income homeowners. In a 2026 letter to the Concord Monitor, Jack Shields wrote that the New Hampshire Advantage "forces us out of our homes" and that "there is no 'advantage'" for those on fixed incomes.

In 2026, a proposal by Democratic activist Andru Volinsky to introduce a 3% income tax in order to lower property taxes was met with strong opposition, including a death threat from the Libertarian Party of New Hampshire. Governor Kelly Ayotte stated, "No income tax, no sales tax. Not now, not EVER."

== Constitutional amendment proposals ==
In 2026, the "New Hampshire Advantage Amendment" was introduced in the state legislature. The proposed constitutional amendment would have prohibited the New Hampshire House of Representatives from enacting an income tax. Although the amendment received a public hearing, it was not enacted into law.

== See also ==
- Economy of New Hampshire
- Live Free or Die
