= Profile Lake (New Hampshire) =

Lake in New Hampshire, United States

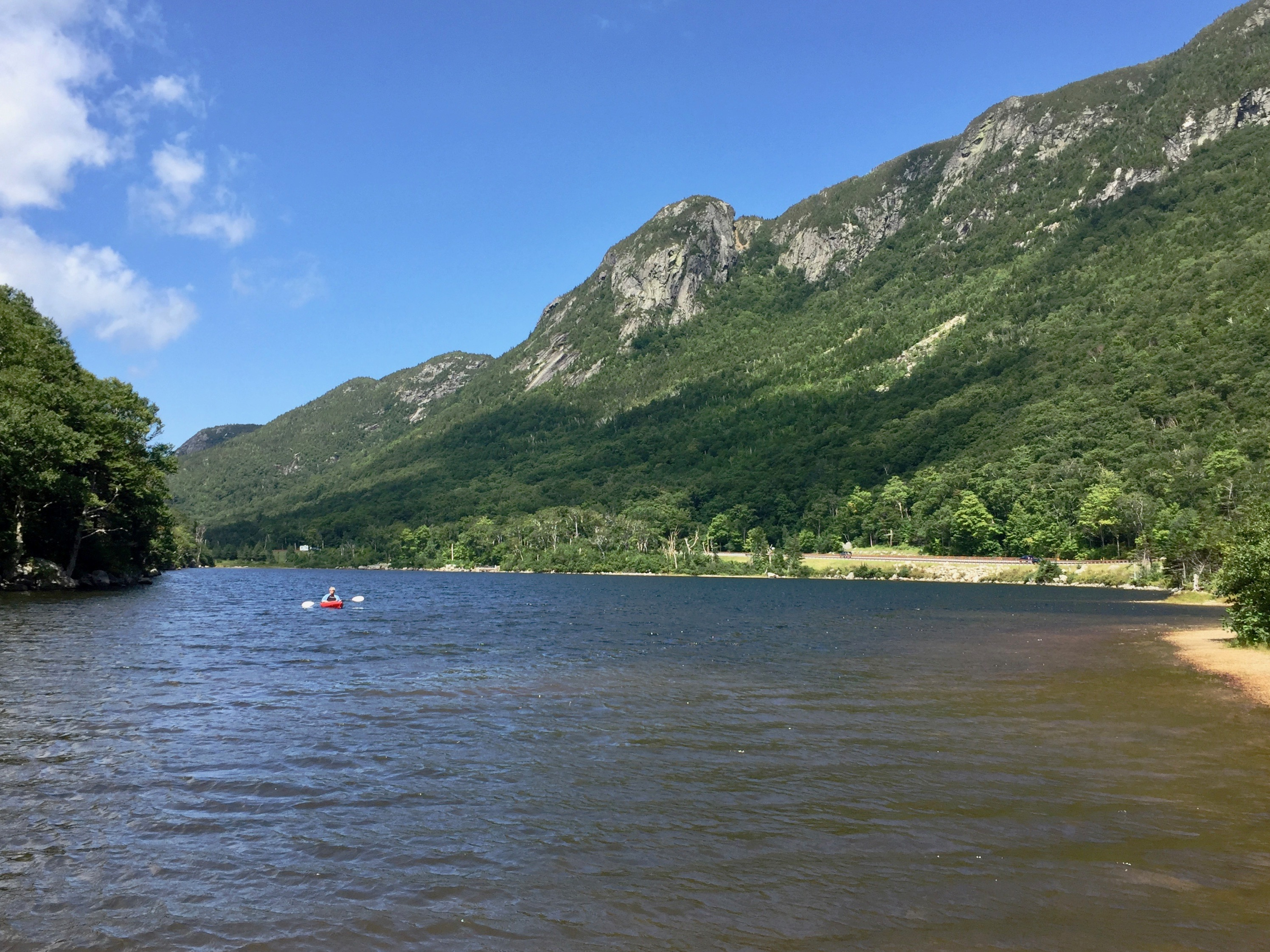

- Location within New Hampshire Location within the United States
- Location: Franconia Notch State Park, Franconia, Grafton County, New Hampshire
- Coordinates: 44°9′49″N 71°40′41″W
- Primary outflows: Pemigewasset River
- Basin countries: United States
- Max. length: 0.3 mi (0.48 km)
- Max. width: 0.1 mi (0.16 km)
- Surface area: 13 acres (53,000 m^{2})
- Average depth: 6 ft (1.8 m)
- Max. depth: 15 ft (4.6 m)
- Surface elevation: 1,930 ft (590 m)

Profile Lake is a 13-acre (53,000 m^{2}) water body located in Franconia Notch in the White Mountains of New Hampshire, at the foot of Cannon Mountain. The lake was given its name due to its location directly beneath the Old Man of the Mountain, a famous rock formation which collapsed in 2003. The lake is near the height of land in Franconia Notch; the lake's outlet is the Pemigewasset River, which flows south to the Merrimack River and ultimately the Gulf of Maine (Atlantic Ocean) at Newburyport, Massachusetts.

The lake is classified as a coldwater fishery, with observed species including brook trout. Only fly fishing is allowed at Profile Lake.

== See also ==
- List of lakes in New Hampshire
- Profile House, grand hotel that was in the area until it burned and the property was made into the Franconia Notch State Park
- Echo Lake (New Hampshire)
