= Live Free or Die =

State motto of New Hampshire, US

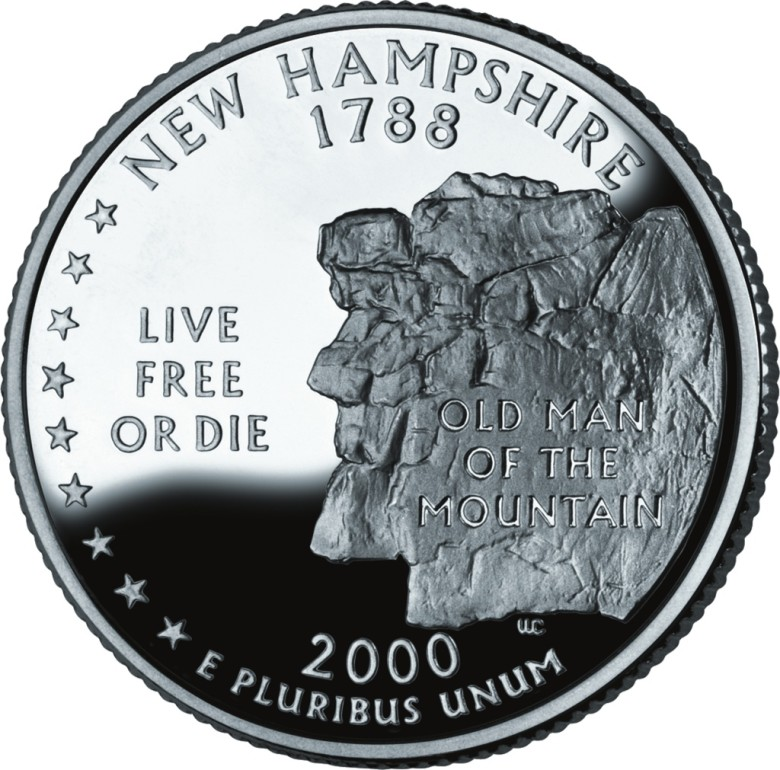
"Live Free or Die" on the New Hampshire state quarter

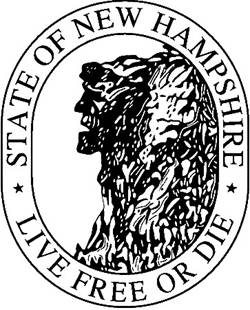
"Live Free or Die" in the state emblem

"Live Free or Die" is the official motto of the U.S. state of New Hampshire, adopted by the state in 1945 and is arguably one of the most well-known state mottos.

The phrase was adopted from a toast written by General John Stark, New Hampshire's most famous soldier of the American Revolutionary War, on July 31, 1809. Poor health forced Stark to decline an invitation to an anniversary reunion of the Battle of Bennington. Instead, he sent his toast by letter:

Live free or die: Death is not the worst of evils.

By the time Stark wrote this, Vivre Libre ou Mourir ("Live free or die") was a popular motto of the French Revolution and was required as an oath of office for all legislators for the duration of the Constitution of 1791. A possible source of such mottoes is Patrick Henry's famed March 23, 1775, speech to the House of Burgesses (the legislative body of the Virginia colony), which contained the following phrase: "Is life so dear, or peace so sweet, as to be purchased at the price of chains and slavery? Forbid it, Almighty God! I know not what course others may take; but as for me, give me liberty or give me death!" However, the existence of Henry’s phrase is not recorded until its publication in 1817, so whether it could have influenced these mottoes cannot be ascertained.

The motto was enacted at the same time as the New Hampshire state emblem, on which it appears.

== Legal battle ==
In 1970, the New Hampshire state legislature mandated that the phrase "LIVE FREE OR DIE" appear on all non-commercial license plates, replacing "Scenic." Some citizens altered or obscured the phrase, saying it was forced speech, in violation of the First Amendment. One said it was placed on the plates by “jingoistic, sloganeering politicians trying to apply our state motto to the Vietnam War,” in which U.S. troops were involved until 1973. That spurred "a battle between state power to compel citizens to display a message they disagreed with and determined dissenters willing to resist, even to the point of going to jail for their beliefs," according to the Valley News. As the war wound down, the issue faded, but it erupted again in November 1974 when George Maynard, a Jehovah's Witness (albeit a disfellowshipped member), covered up "or die" on his plate. He stated, "By religious training and belief, I believe my 'government' – Jehovah's Kingdom – offers everlasting life. It would be contrary to that belief to give up my life for the state, even if it meant living in bondage."

In 1977, the U.S. Supreme Court ruled 7-2 in the case of Wooley v. Maynard, 430 U.S. 705, that the state of New Hampshire could not prosecute motorists who chose to hide part or all of the motto. It likened Maynard's refusal to accept the state motto with the right of Jehovah's Witness children to refuse to say the Pledge of Allegiance in public school, established in the court's 1943 decision West Virginia State Board of Education v. Barnette.

Chief Justice Warren Burger wrote for the majority in Maynard:

We begin with the proposition that the right of freedom of thought protected by the First Amendment against state action includes both the right to speak freely and the right to refrain from speaking at all.

Here, as in Barnette, we are faced with a state measure which forces an individual, as part of his daily life indeed constantly while his automobile is in public view to be an instrument for fostering public adherence to an ideological point of view he finds unacceptable.

The fact that most individuals agree with the thrust of New Hampshire's motto is not the test; most Americans also find the flag salute acceptable.

The Supreme Court concluded that the state's interests paled in comparison to individuals' free expression rights.

== Similar phrases ==
The English romantic poet William Wordsworth composed the line, "We must be free or die, who speak the tongue that Shakespeare spoke."

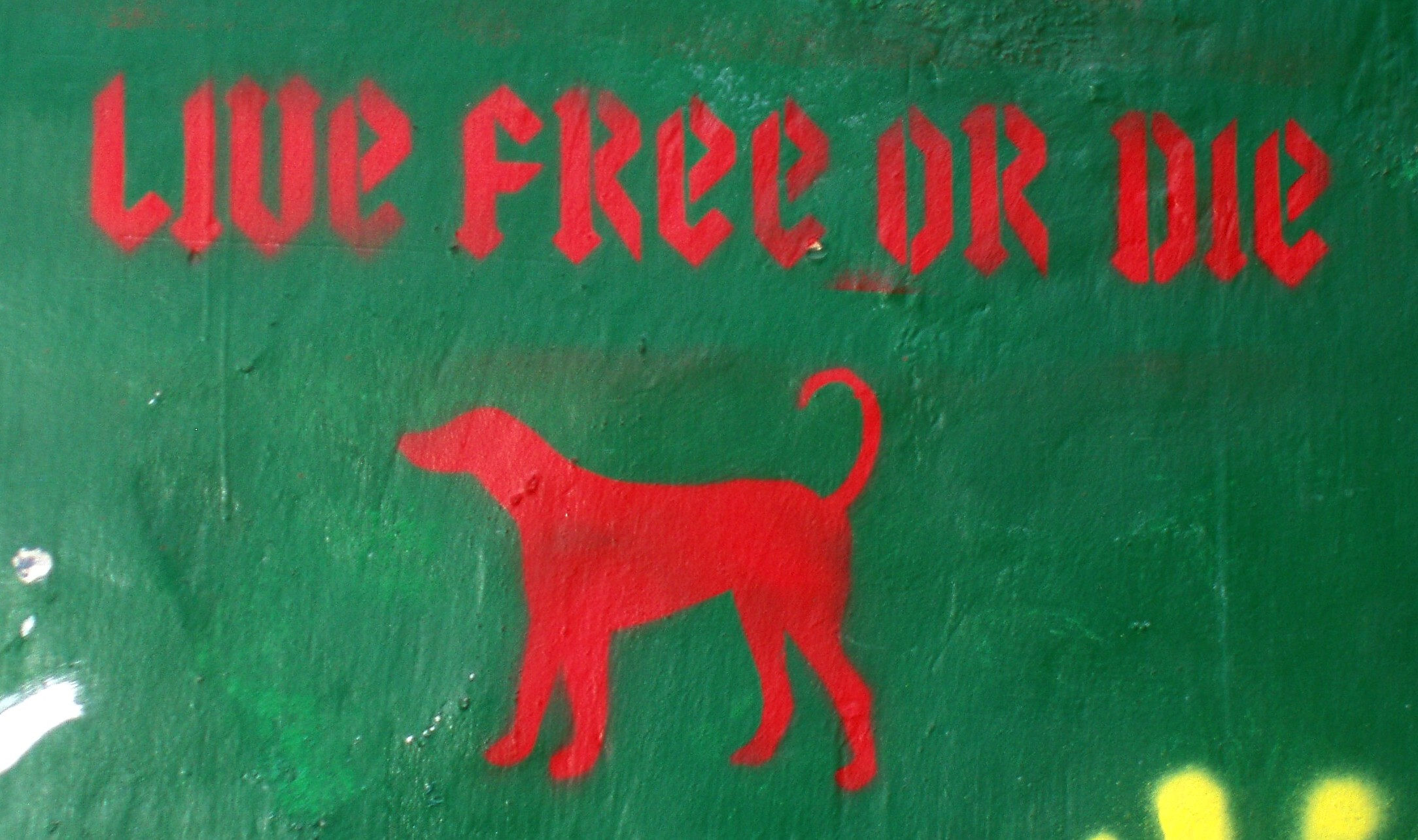
Live Free or Die, as seen in Edinburgh, Scotland

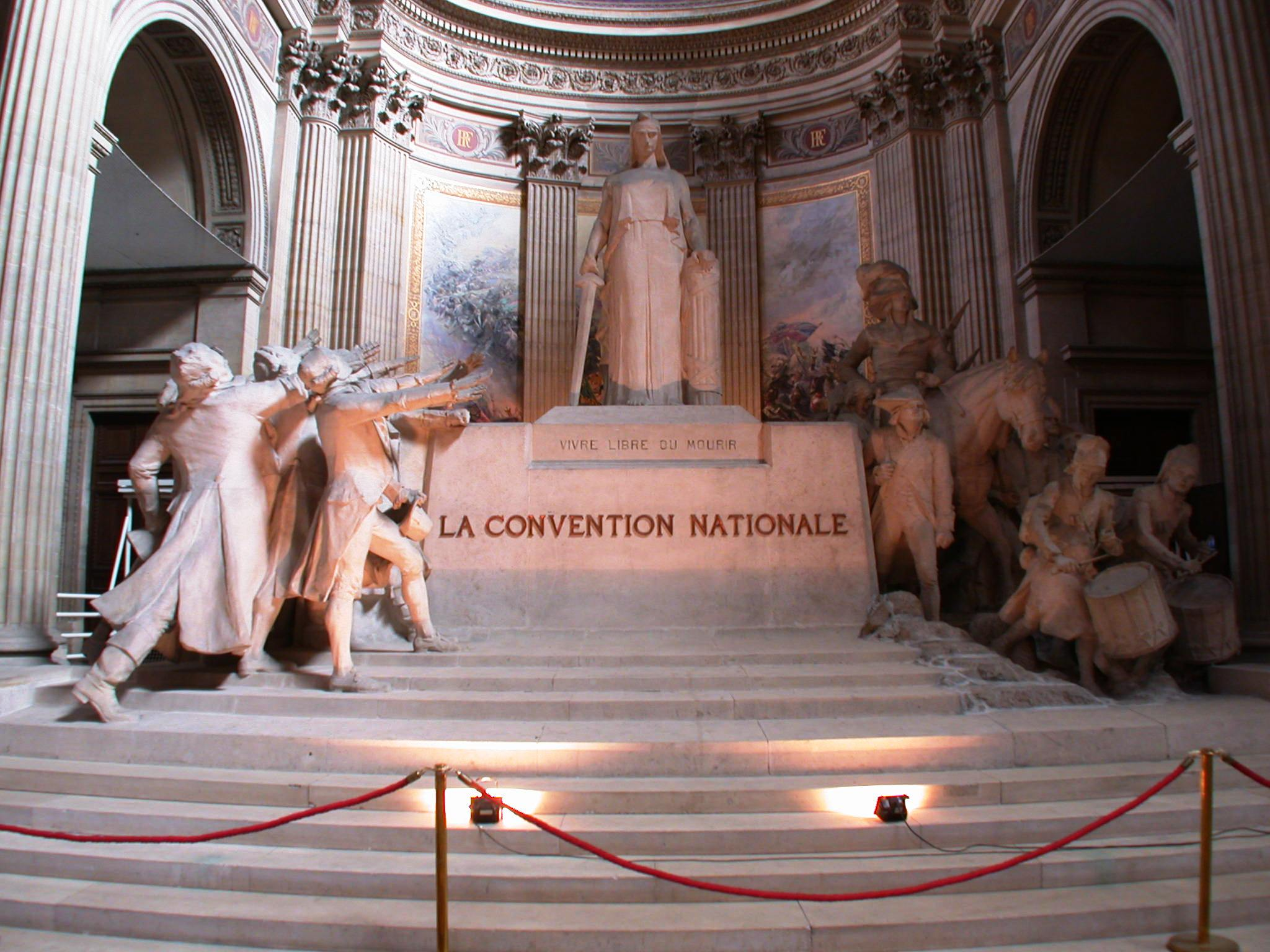
The motto Vivre Libre ou Mourir on the central monument of the Panthéon in Paris, which represents the National Convention

Many mottos and slogans around the world and throughout history have contrasted freedom and death. Some examples:

The phrase "Vivre Libre ou Mourir" ("live free or die") was used in the French Revolution. It was the subtitle of the journal by Camille Desmoulins, titled Le Vieux Cordelier, written during the winter of 1793–1794.

A medal struck at Matthew Boulton's Soho Mint, as tokens of exchange for the Paris firm of Monneron Freres, 1791–1792, has on its obverse the motto Vivre libres ou mourir ("Live free or die" in French).

During the Siege of Barcelona (25 August 1713 – 11 September 1714) the Barcelona defenders and the Maulets used black flags with the motto "Live free or die", in Catalan "Viurem lliures o morirem". It is now used as a symbol of Catalan independentism.

The phrase "Antes morrer livres que em Paz sujeitos" (English: Rather die free than in peace be subjugated) is contained in a 1582 letter reply to King Philip II of Spain from the Portuguese governor of the Azores, Ciprião de Figueiredo. It has been adopted as the Azores motto and is present in the autonomous region's coat of arms.

The Declaration of Arbroath of 1320, the document in which the Scottish nobility appealed to Pope John XXII to recognise Scotland's independence from England, contains an oft-cited line, "It is in truth not for glory, nor riches, nor honours that we are fighting, but for freedom – for that alone, which no honest man gives up but with life itself."

On January 1, 1804, Jean-Jacques Dessalines proclaimed Haiti, then a French slave colony, to be free and independent. He is said to have torn the white section from the French tricolor flag and to have shouted, "Vivre libre ou mourir! That means live free or die!"

The first Convention of the Delegates of the Scottish Friends of the People in Edinburgh on 11–13 December 1792 used the phrase "live free or die" and referred to it as a "French oath."

- "Свобода или смърт" (Svoboda ili smart – "Freedom or death") was the motto of the Bulgarian Revolutionary Central Committee during the struggle for national independence in the 19th century. The motto is displayed on most revolutionary flags during the April uprising of 1876.

=== National mottos ===
- "Ελευθερία ή Θάνατος" (Eleutheria i thanatos – "Freedom or death") is the national motto of Greece and comes from the motto of the Greek War of Independence (1821–1830).
- "Մահ կամ Ազատություն" ("Mah kam Azatutiun" – "Freedom or death") was the motto of the Armenian Revolutionary Federation during the movement for Armenia's independence.
- "Libertad o Muerte" – "Liberty or Death" is the national motto of Uruguay. "Libertad o con gloria morir" ("Liberty, or die in glory") is part of the National Anthem of Uruguay.
- "Independência, ou morte!" – "Independence or death" was the national motto of the Brazilian Empire.
- "Ya istiklal ya ölüm" – "Independence or death" was the motto of the Turkish resistance during the Turkish National Movement and the Turkish War of Independence.
- "Eala Frya Fresena" – "Rise up, Free Frisians," according to Tilemann Dothias Wiarda (1777), was spoken at the Upstalsboom in Aurich during the Late Middle Ages. Since the mid-19th century, Frisian nationalists tend to answer it with "Lewwer duad üs Slaav", or "Better dead than a slave."
- "Liberté, Égalité, Fraternité, ou la mort" – "Liberty, Equality, Fraternity, or Death" was the early motto of the French Revolution. Later versions dropped "ou la mort." The full motto is still displayed above the entrance of the city hall of Troyes.
- The Romanian national anthem, Deșteaptă-te, române!, contains the line "‘Viața-n libertate ori moarte!"’ strigă toți", meaning "'Life in freedom or death!' shout all".
- "Ӏожалла я маршо" (Jozhalla ya marsho "Death or Freedom") was the national anthem and the slogan of the Chechen Republic of Ichkeria (1991–1996).
- "Bolje grob nego rob, Bolje rat nego pakt" – "Better the grave than a slave, better a war than the pact" was the motto of Yugoslav demonstrators during the 1941 Yugoslav coup d'état, after the Yugoslav government had signed a pact with the Axis powers.
- "Воля України або смерть" (Volya Ukrayiny abo smert "Freedom of Ukraine or death") was a motto of the Ukrainian rebels of the Kholodny Yar Republic during the Ukrainian War of Independence and later became a motto that was adopted by the protesters of Euromaidan. The phrase was mentioned by Ukrainian president Petro Poroshenko in a September 2014 speech to the U.S. Congress.

== Other uses ==
The motto is one of the 101 reasons cited by the Free State Project, a libertarian organization, for the choice of New Hampshire as their destination.

"Live Free or Die" is the motto of USS New Hampshire, a Virginia-class nuclear-powered attack submarine in the United States Navy.

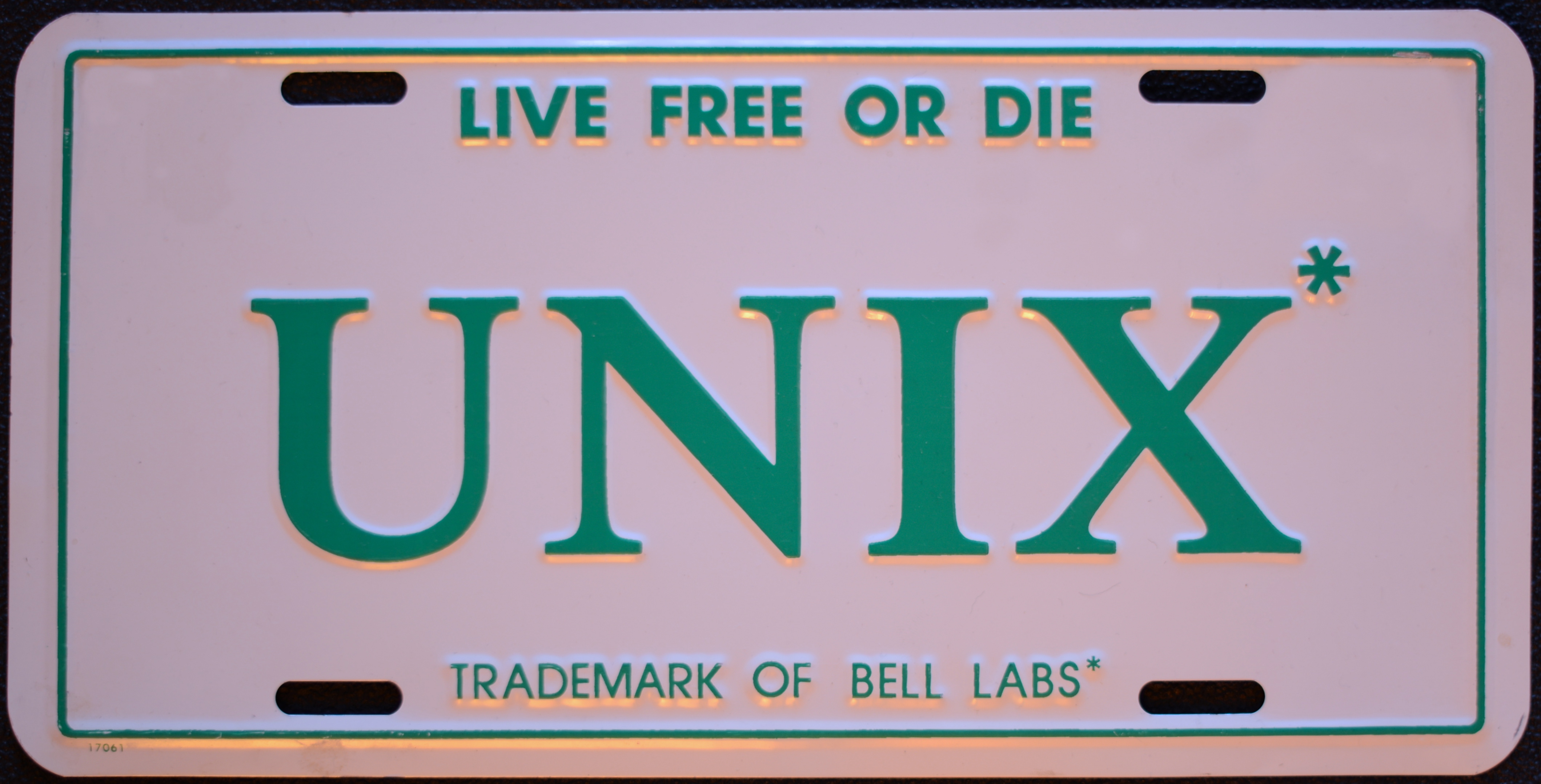
Original NH-style DEC UNIX license plate facsimile

"Live Free or Die" is popular among Unix users, a group which also cherishes its independence. The popularity dates to the 1980s, when Armando Stettner of Digital Equipment Corporation (DEC) had a set of Unix license plates printed up and given away at a USENIX conference. They were modeled on the license plates in New Hampshire, where DEC's Unix Engineering Group was headquartered. Stettner lived in New Hampshire at the time and used the vanity license plate UNIX. When DEC came out with its own Unix version, Ultrix, they printed up Ultrix plates that were distributed at trade shows.

=== In popular culture ===
==== Books ====
- Live Free or Die is the title of a 1990 novel by New Hampshire writer Ernest Hebert.
- Live Free Or Die is the first book in John Ringo's Troy Rising science fiction series.
- Live Free Or Die: America (and the World) on the Brink is the title of a 2020 book by Sean Hannity.

==== TV ====
- "Live Free or Die" is the title of the sixth episode of the sixth season of the TV show The Sopranos. It concerns a captain in the New Jersey mafia who hides in New Hampshire after being outed as a homosexual.
- "Live Free or Die" is the title of the first episode of the fifth season of Breaking Bad.
- Live Free or Die is the title of a National Geographic Channel show that premiered on September 30, 2014.

==== Film ====
- Live Free or Die, a 2000 documentary about abortion
- Live Free or Die, a 2006 comedy movie
- Live Free or Die Hard, a 2007 movie, the fourth in the Die Hard series

==== Music ====
- Live Free or Die, a 2004 album by Vancouver punk group D.O.A.
- Bill Morrissey wrote a song titled "Live Free or Die" about the irony of a prisoner serving time in New Hampshire's jails and hand-stamping license plates with the state motto. It was covered by Hayes Carll on his 2002 album Flowers and Liquor.
- "Vivre Libre ou Mourir" ("Live Free or Die") by Bérurier Noir, a French punk rock band

== See also ==
- Join, or Die
- Battle of Warns ("Better to be dead than a slave")
- Free State Project – movement aiming to move 20,000 libertarians to New Hampshire, in part, inspired by state motto
- Liberty or death, for uses of a similar motto
- New Hampshire Advantage
