= Eala Frya Fresena =

East Frisian–language motto

Frisian Coat of Arms.

Eala Frya Fresena (East Frisian Low Saxon IPA: [ˈeːla ˈfrɪja ˈfreːzəna]) is the motto for the coat of arms of East Frisia in northern Germany. The motto is often mistranslated as "Hail, free Frisians!", but it was the reversal of the feudal prostration and is better translated as "Stand up, free Frisians!". According to 16th-century sources, it was spoken at the Upstalsboom in Aurich where Frisian judges met on Pentecost and it is traditionally answered with Lever dood as Slaav, or in English, "better dead than a slave".

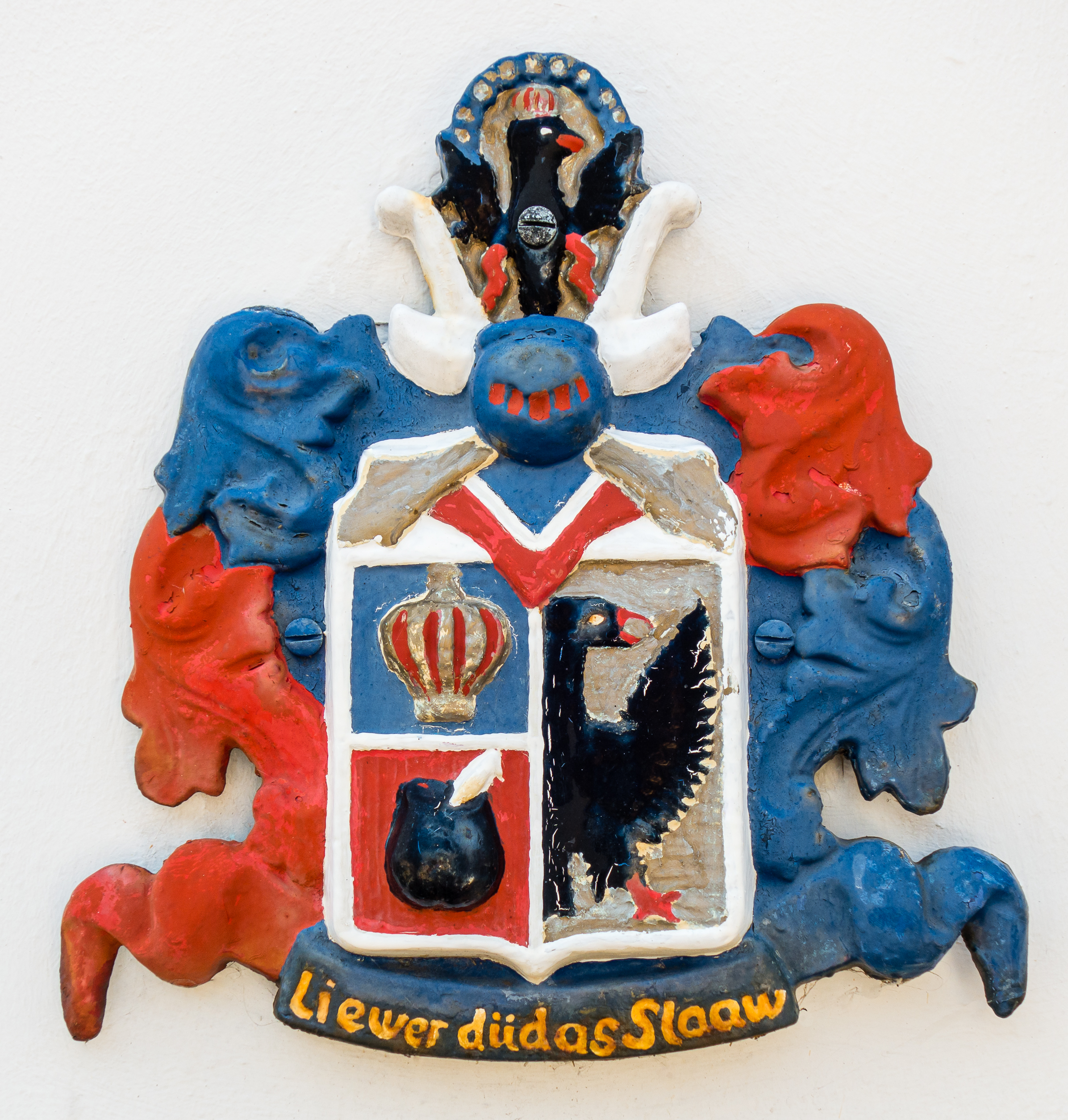
Coat of arms of Wyk auf Föhr

The motto refers to the legendary "Frisian Freedom", a polity and right to accept no rule besides the Holy Roman Emperor and the Christian God. The right was in the Middle Ages supposed to have been granted by Charlemagne for Frisian support of Pope Leo IV (who was not contemporary with Charlemagne). It was said to have been renewed by Charles the Fat in 885 for saving him from Normans. The Frisian freedom basically meant a claim of freedom from tax and fief, to defend themselves against the Normans, Vikings and the northern sea. Friesland offered unclaimed land for everyone, however the unclaimed land of the country was under water half of the day. The daily fight against the northern sea ensured equality of the people who were living on warfs during this time. Tax and fief was therefore replaced by the duty to build dikes.

== History ==
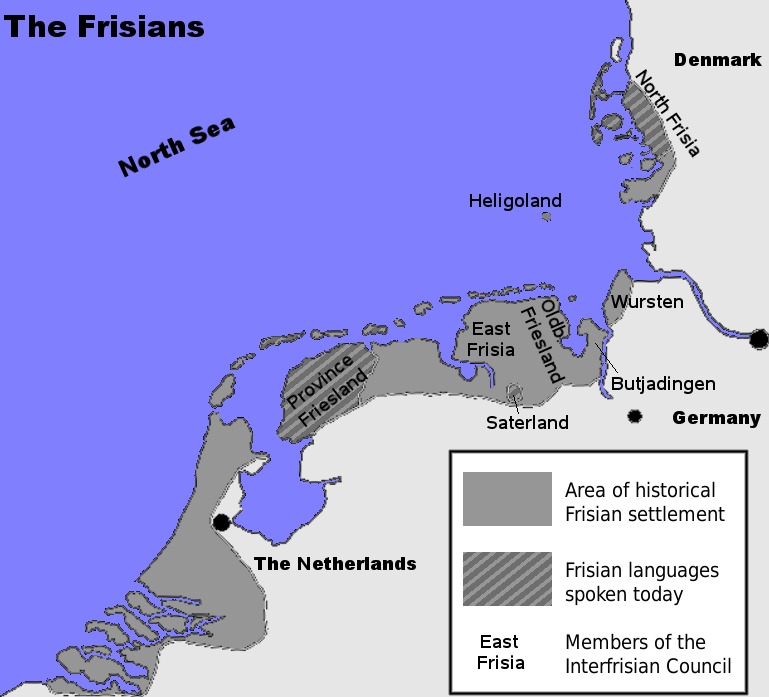
Frisian settlement area (Frisian coast)

The number of Frisian sealands grew from the original seven up to 27 at their height in the early 14th century. Each Frisian sealand sent two judges during Pentecost to an annual meeting at the Upstalsboom, to discuss disputes between the tribes. Friesland had a nearly democratic government, unlike most of Europe during Middle Ages. While the judges had been delegated to rule legally, later on the hovedlinge had been self-elected by their wealth to rule the military. Several of them became known for supporting pirates to refinance their wealth. For example, the hoveling Keno ten Broke hosted the famous Klaus Störtebeker.

In the late Middle Ages, Friesland had no central government, but was ruled by either their local chieftains or changing foreign powers. The Frisians revolted often against the foreigners. The Stedinger revolt of 1233–34 caused Pope Gregory IX to call a crusade against them, marking the decline of Frisian freedom. Frisian freedom officially ended in 1498 when Emperor Maximilian I gave Friesland as a fief to Albert, Duke of Saxony to pay a 300,000-guilder debt, but Albert had to conquer Friesland himself first.

== In popular culture ==
The band Eastfrisian Terror, from Emden, Germany, released their debut EP Lever Dood As Slav, the third song of which was titled "Eala Frya Fresena".

== See also ==
- "Live Free or Die"
- Frisia
