= New England Ski Museum =

Museum in New Hampshire, United States

Coordinates: 44°10′14″N 71°41′21″W

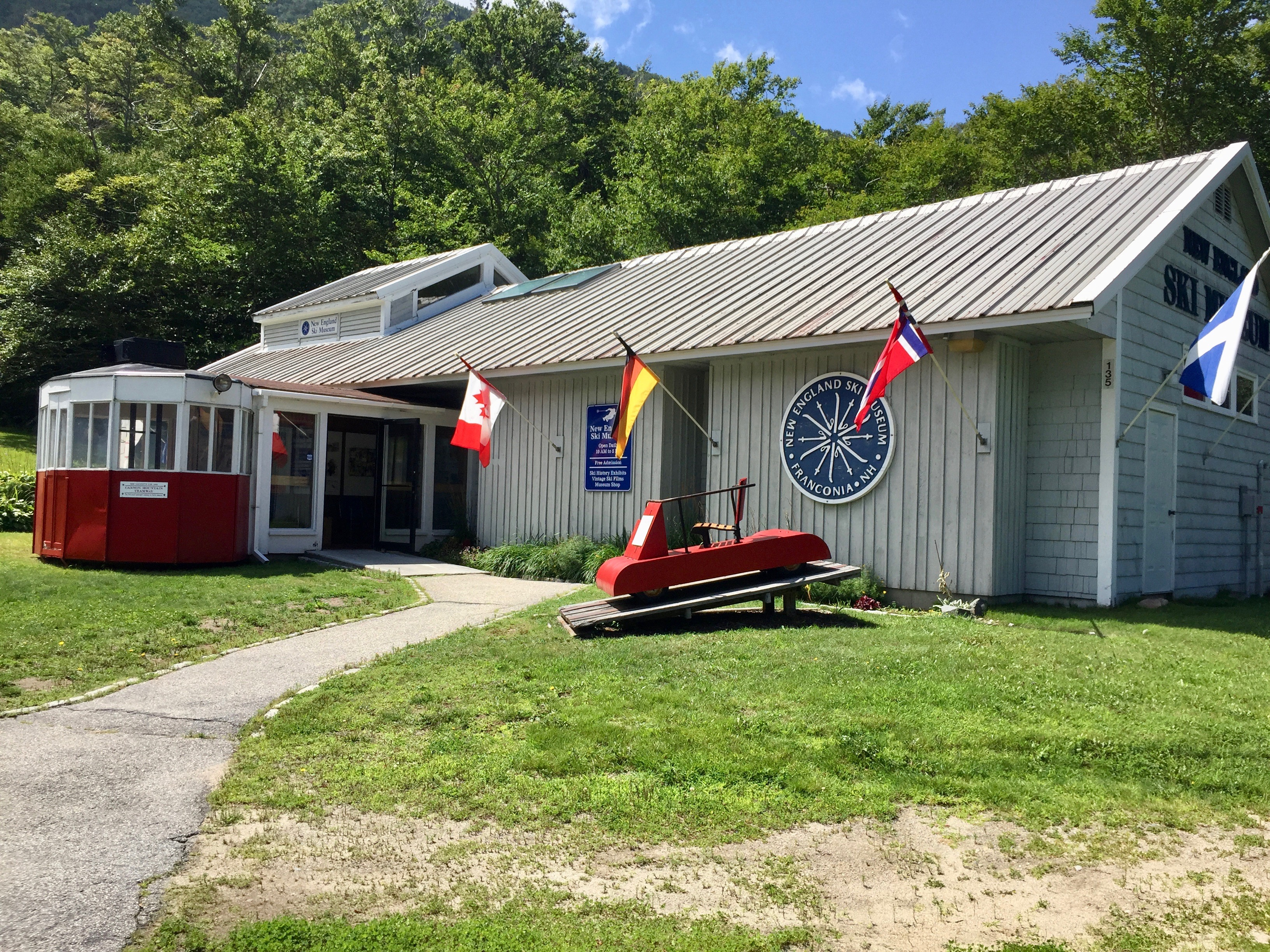

The New England Ski Museum is a non-profit operation in Franconia, New Hampshire.

== History ==
Founded in 1977, in 1982 it moved into its permanent building near the tramway of Cannon Mountain ski area, in Franconia Notch State Park.

== Operations ==
The museum was designed to preserve the history of commercial and recreational skiing, both alpine and cross-country, in the northeastern United States. It is one of four ski museums in the United States that are recognized by the United States Ski and Snowboard Association.
