= Emblem of New Hampshire =

United States state emblem

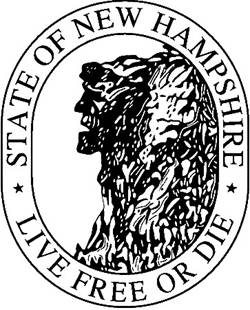
The state emblem

The State Emblem of New Hampshire is an elliptical panel with a picture of the Old Man of the Mountain surrounded on the top by the state name and on the bottom by the state motto, "Live Free or Die." The emblem was officially declared by the New Hampshire General Court in 1945. In 1957, the emblem law, RSA 3:1, was amended to swap the positioning of the state motto and state name. The emblem law states that the emblem "may be placed on all printed or related material issued by the state and its subdivisions relative to the development of recreational, industrial, and agricultural resources of the state."
