= Cannon Mountain (New Hampshire) =

Mountain in New Hampshire, US

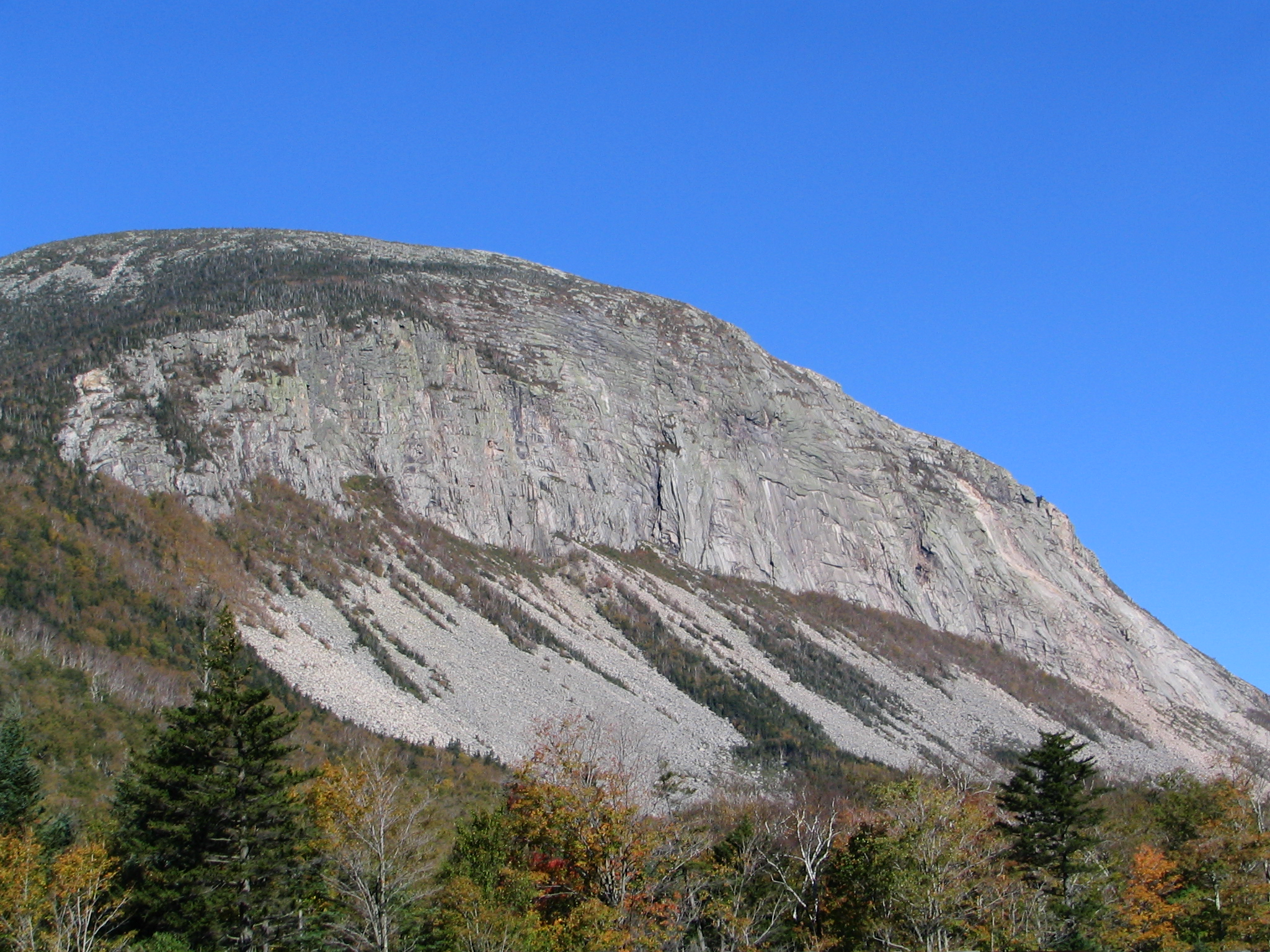
- Cannon Cliff, the southeast face of Cannon Mountain

Highest point
- Elevation: 4080+ feet (1244+ m)
- Prominence: 740 ft (230 m)
- Listing: White Mountain 4000-footers
- Coordinates: 44°09′23″N 71°41′54″W

Geography
- Location: Grafton County, New Hampshire, U.S.
- Parent range: White Mountains
- Topo map: USGS Franconia

Climbing
- Easiest route: Kinsman Ridge Trail

Cannon Mountain (formerly Profile Mountain) is a 4,080-foot (1,240 m) peak in the White Mountains of New Hampshire. It is known for both its technical rock and ice climbing on its cliff face and skiing at Cannon Mountain Ski Area. It was also home to the Old Man of the Mountain, until that formation collapsed on May 3, 2003.

Cannon has three sub-peaks with heights of 3,693, 3,700, and 3,769 feet (1,125, 1,127 and 1,148 m), collectively known as "The Cannon Balls". Geologically, it is an exfoliating granite dome. Part of the Kinsman Range, the mountain is within Franconia Notch State Park.

== History ==
Rock climbers were pioneering routes on Cannon's cliffs in the 1920s. Its ski area is one of the oldest in North America. Trails had been cut on the mountain prior to 1933, but the mountain gained widespread recognition that year when the Taft Slalom was cut as the first racing trail in North America. The mountain gained lift service with the construction of the first aerial tramway in North America, in 1938. A new tram was erected in 1980 with a vertical ascent of 2,022 feet (616.3 m) and a capacity of 140 people (two seventy-person cabins), roughly three times larger than the original lift. The old tram base and summit-stations remain intact, and one of the old cabins serves as the entranceway to the New England Ski Museum, opened in 1982 at the mountain's base area. The museum houses what it calls "the most extensive collection of historical ski equipment, clothing, film, photographs, literature, and artwork in the East" and is one of four museums in the U.S. to be recognized by the United States Ski Association as a Regional Museum.

Cannon hosted the first Alpine Skiing World Cup races ever held in North America in 1967, with races being listed as occurring at Franconia.

In 1972, the US Board on Geographic Names officially changed the name from Profile Mountain, which it had been called officially since 1917, to Cannon Mountain. The two names both are derived from natural rock formations featured on the mountain; the former being the famous "Old Man of the Mountain" and the latter being a series of boulders which, when viewed from the foot of the mountain, resemble an antique cannon. Before being called Profile Mountain, the mountain was also called Frank Mountain.

On April 2, 1973, the second strongest surface wind gust ever recorded in the United States of America was measured by University of Massachusetts Amherst researchers on the summit. Although wind velocity maxima were measured at 199.5 mph (321 km/h), this reading represents the physical limit of the recording instrument, and thus the true value may have been quite higher. Only the record value measured on nearby Mount Washington in 1934 exceeds this value in terms of American wind extrema.

The summit of Cannon Mountain is home to a UHF amateur radio repeater on 449.875 MHz as well as two repeaters belonging to the ABC affiliate WMUR-TV.

== Recreation and tourism ==
Cannon Mountain and its base area host a variety of year-round sports, including hiking, climbing, skiing and fishing. Visiting tourists can take in the area's scenery, an aerial tramway, summit restaurant, and a museum on the history of skiing.

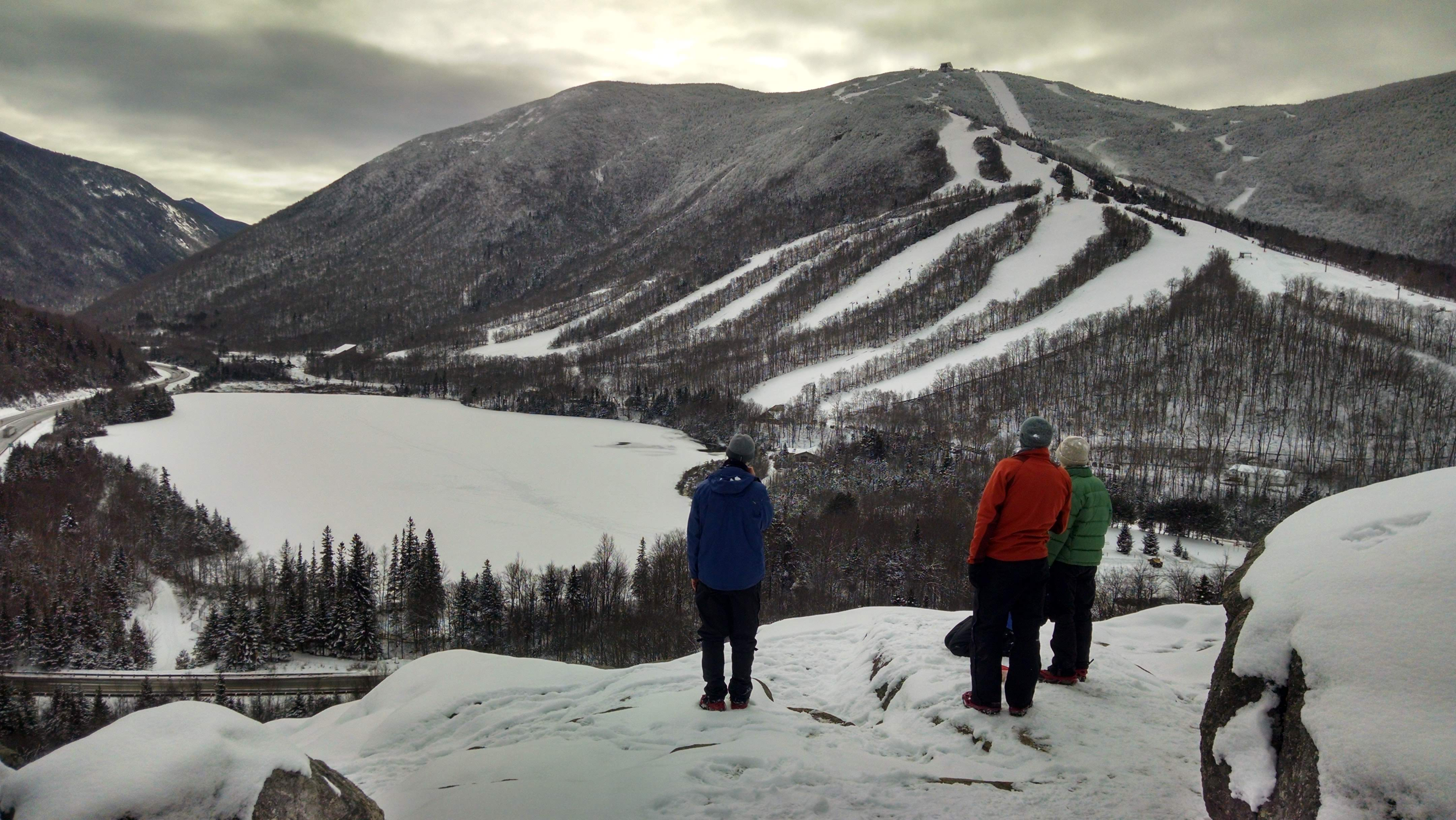
Cannon Mountain Ski Area and Echo Lake seen from Artist's Bluff, December 2018

=== Hiking ===
A number of trails criss-cross Cannon Mountain and the surrounding region. The Kinsman Ridge Trail begins on the northeast side of the mountain in Franconia Notch near the base of the Tramway, passes near but not directly over the summit, and leads to the southwest across the Cannon Balls and the Kinsman peaks on to Kinsman Notch at the north base of Mount Moosilauke. The Mittersill-Cannon Trail, seasonally open from spring to fall, climbs to the summit area from the northwest, traversing Mittersill Peak on its climb. Both trails join the Rim Trail near the summit, which in turn climbs to the summit tower in a loop partially overlapped by the KRT. Lonesome Lake, on the south side of the mountain, is a popular hiking destination and is the location of the Appalachian Mountain Club-maintained Lonesome Lake Hut. The Appalachian Trail passes Lonesome Lake but does not cross the summit of Cannon. The base of the cliff face can be approached via an ambiguous path up the right side of the talus field.

=== Climbing ===
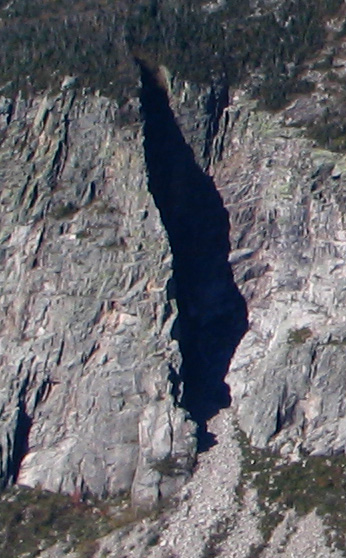
Whitney-Gilman Ridge

Cannon's most prominent ice climb, the Black Dike

The Omega climbing route

At roughly 1,000 feet (300 m) high and more than 1 mile (1.6 km) long, Cannon Cliff is the largest vertical rock face in the Northeast. According to a SummitPost description, "Some of the aid lines are long and difficult enough to require a bivy, making Cannon the only Big Wall in the northeast." Cannon is popular with free- and aid-climbers in summer and ice- and mixed climbers in winter. (V)Ice Fest, an annual ice climbing festival, is held in the Franconia Notch region and features climbing on Cannon Cliff.

Climbers are asked to sign in and out of a log book so that search parties may be organized if they are overdue. Several rock and ice guide books exist for Cannon and Franconia Notch, most notably 'Secrets of the Notch' by Jon Sykes.

Notable rock climbing routes:

- Whitney-Gilman Ridge: 5.7, 5 pitches. This route up the prominent arête in the center of the face is possibly Cannon's signature climb. The 3rd pitch (the 'Pipe Pitch') features outstanding exposure over the Black Dike. Protection is a mix of trad and fixed bolts and pitons. First ascent was by Bradley Gilman and Hassler Whitney on August 3, 1929.
- Moby Grape: 5.8, 9 pitches. Ascends the tallest section of the cliff. Starts with Reppy's Crack; superb climbing all the way up. First ascent was by Joe Cote and Roger Martin in July 1972.

Notable ice climbing routes:

- The Black Dike: 4+/5-, 500 ft (150 m) tall; 3 pitches. A popular mixed ice climb. First ascent was by John Bouchard on December 18, 1971 (solo).
- Omega: 5+, 3 pitches. Mixed climbing. Hardest ice climb in the region. First ascent by John Bouchard and Rainsford Rouner in 1976.

==== Approach and descent ====
The approach trail to Cannon cliff can be found by walking along the bike path on the western (southbound) side of I-93. Climbers park and sign in at a trailhead lot just south of Profile Lake. After about 1 mile (1.6 km) of narrow, climber-maintained trails through the woods, climbers must cross a long section of talus.

Steep unofficial descent trails back to the trailhead can be found on both the north and south ends of the cliff, above Whitney-Gilman and Lakeside, respectively.

=== Skiing ===
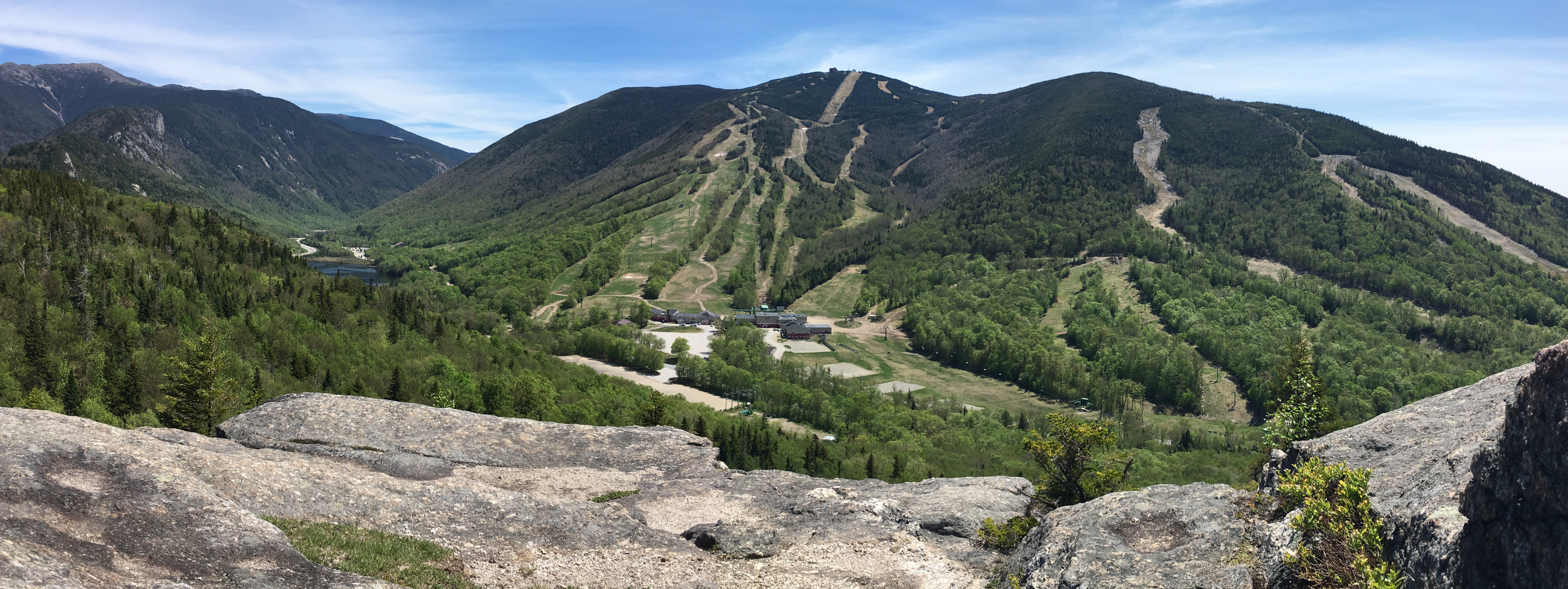
Cannon Mountain Ski Area with Mittersill on the right.

The Cannon Mountain Ski Area is state-owned and offers nine lifts servicing 165 acres (67 ha) of skiing (158 with snowmaking). In the 1930s, the Civilian Conservation Corps cut six ski trails, many of which were later incorporated into the Cannon Mountain Ski Area and, until 1984, the Mittersill Ski Area. The Mittersill Ski Area and Taft CCC Ski Trail were incorporated into the Cannon Mountain Ski Area in 2009.

US Olympic gold medal-winning skier Bode Miller grew up skiing at Cannon.

=== Tourism ===
Cannon has a number of non-sport-related features which make it a popular tourist attraction. The aerial tramway operated year-round until September of 2025 when it was closed and slated for replacement. Though the lift terminates at the summit of the ski area, which is not the peak of the mountain itself, two hiking trails (the Cannon Mountain Short Trail and the Rim Trail) provide a way to the summit. The tramway was open for the summer season in mid-May and closed in mid-October, and was open daily from 9am to 5pm. There, an observation tower provides a panoramic view of the White Mountains Region. The Old Man of the Mountain was a popular attraction until its collapse in spring 2003; the Old Man of the Mountain Historic Site remains an attraction. Also notable is Profile Lake, a lake popular with both fly fisherman and anglers; Echo Lake, used for swimming boating and ice-skating in winter; and the New England Ski Museum.

== See also ==
- Betty and Barney Hill abduction
- List of mountains of New Hampshire
