= Franconia Notch =

Mountain pass in New Hampshire, USA

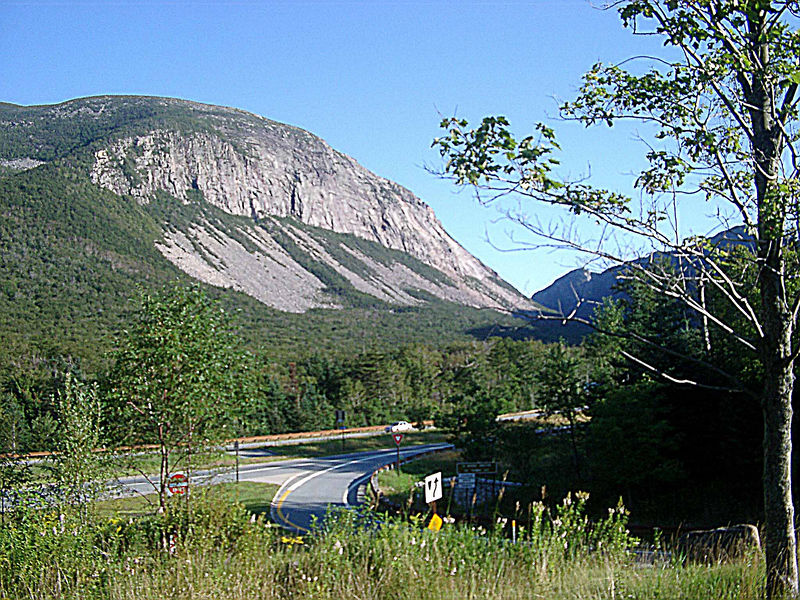
- View of Franconia Notch, dominated by Cannon Mountain. A scree field can be seen at the bottom of the Cannon cliffs.
- Interactive map of Franconia Notch
- Elevation: 1,950 ft (590 m)
- Traversed by: Interstate 93, U.S. Route 3

Third Approach
- Location: Franconia / Lincoln, Grafton County, New Hampshire, United States
- Range: White Mountains
- Coordinates: 44.1707°N 71.6881°W
- Topo map: USGS Franconia (NH)

U.S. National Natural Landmark
- Designated: 1971

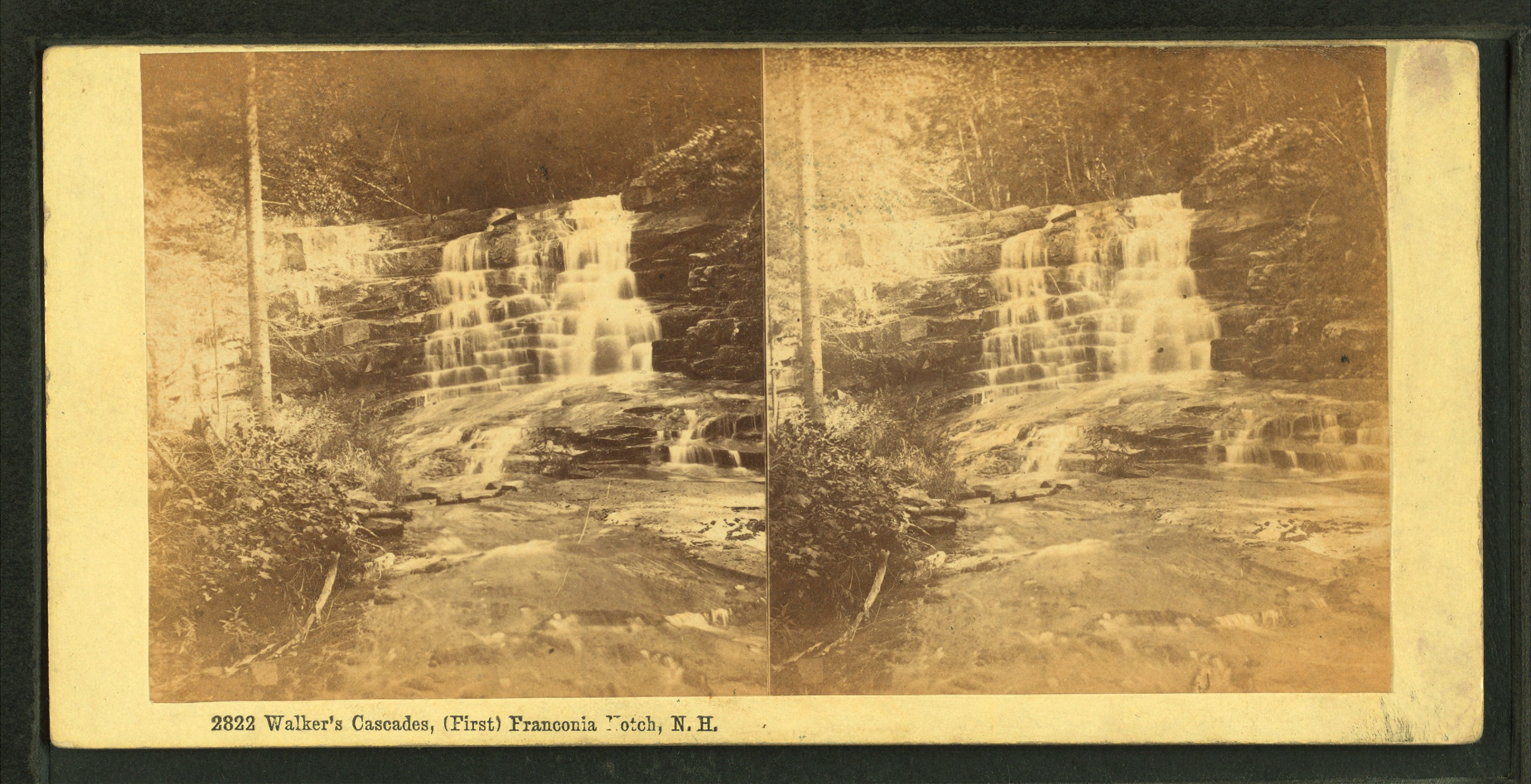
"Walker's Cascades, (First) Franconia Notch" stereoscopic image by the Bierstadt Brothers

Franconia Notch (elev. 1,950 feet/590 m) is a major mountain pass through the White Mountains of New Hampshire. Dominated by Cannon Mountain to the west and Mount Lafayette to the east, it lies principally within Franconia Notch State Park and is traversed by the Franconia Notch Parkway (Interstate 93 and U.S. Route 3). The parkway required a special act of Congress to sidestep design standards for the Interstate highway system because it is only one lane in each direction.

The notch was home to the Old Man of the Mountain, a rock formation which collapsed in 2003 but whose profile remains a symbol of the state of New Hampshire.

The notch is located primarily in the town of Franconia but extends south into Lincoln. It is bordered to the east by Franconia Ridge, comprising Mount Lafayette (5,249 feet/1,600 m), Mount Lincoln (5,089 feet/1,551 m), and Little Haystack Mountain (4,780 feet/1,460 m), and to the west by 4,080-foot (1,240 m) Cannon Mountain and the sheer face of Cannon Cliff. The notch's height of land is located near its northern end, at the base of Cannon Mountain. Echo Lake lies just north of the high point of the notch, with an outlet that flows into Lafayette Brook, then the Gale River, the Ammonoosuc River, and finally the Connecticut River, which enters Long Island Sound at Old Saybrook, Connecticut. Just south of the height of land, Profile Lake lies beneath the cliff that once held the Old Man of the Mountain. Profile Lake is the source of the Pemigewasset River, the primary tributary of the Merrimack River, which flows to the Gulf of Maine at Newburyport, Massachusetts.

== See also ==
- List of mountain passes in New Hampshire
- Profile House
