= Aretas Blood =

American businessman

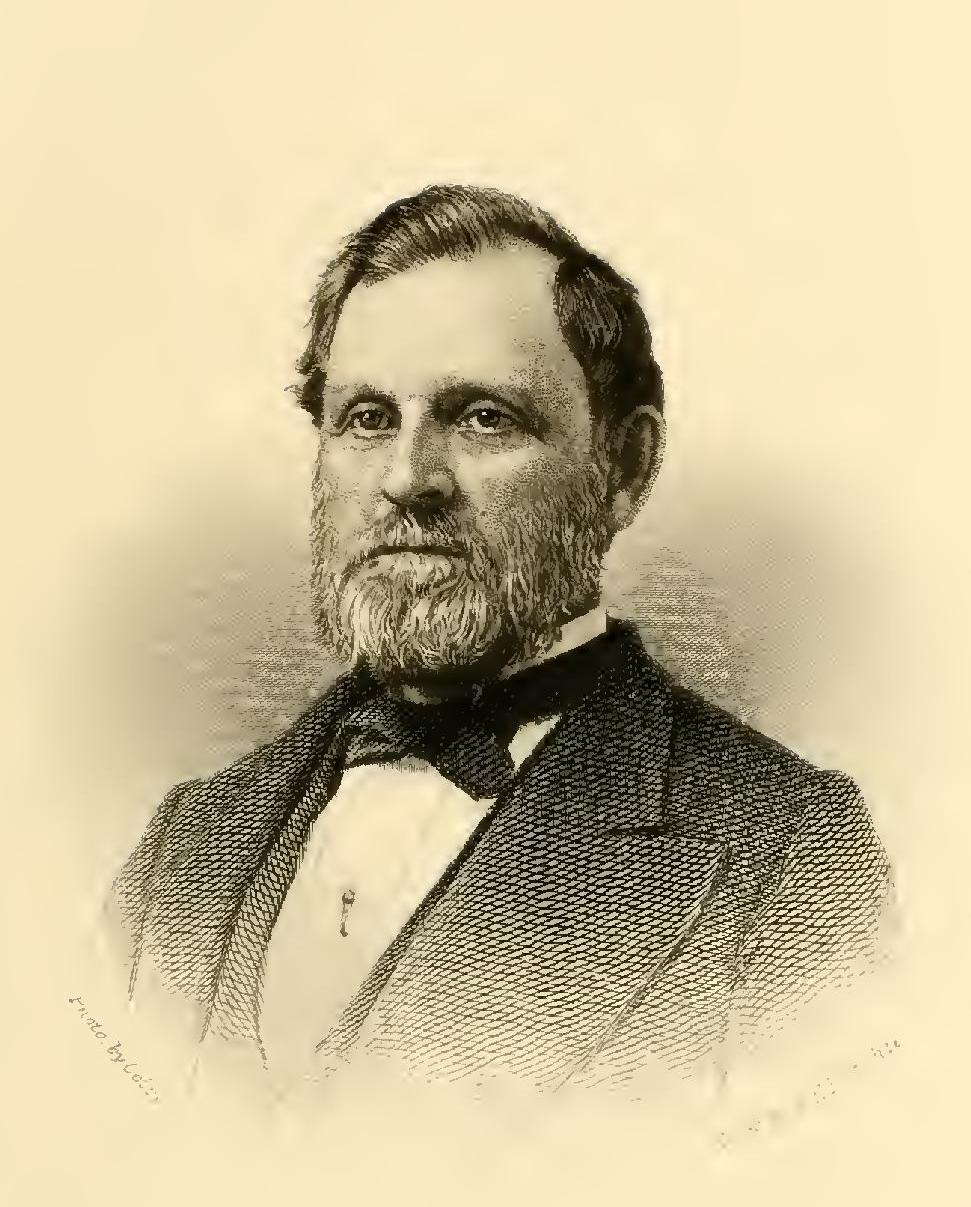
- Aretas Blood circa 1874
- Born: October 8, 1816; Weathersfield, Vermont, U.S.
- Died: November 24, 1897 (aged 81); Manchester, New Hampshire, U.S.
- Resting place: Valley Cemetery; Manchester, New Hampshire
- Political party: Republican
- Spouse: Lavinia Kendall Blood
- Children: Elenora Blood; Emma Blood
- Parent(s): Nathaniel Blood; Roxellana (Proctor) Blood

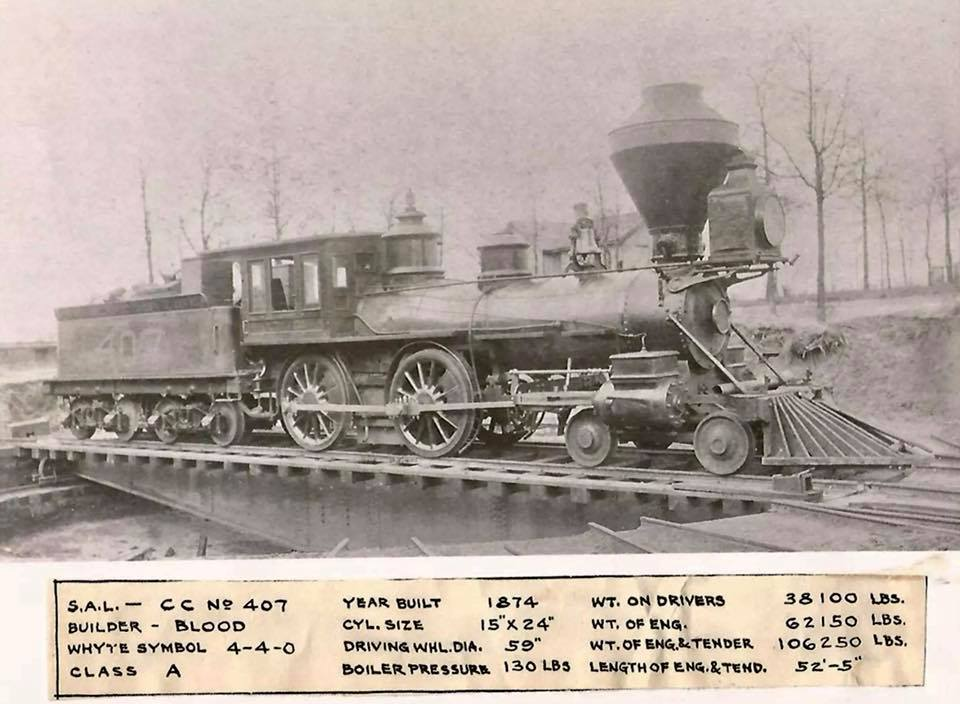
4-4-0 steam locomotive CC No 407 by Aretas Blood from 1874

Aretas Blood (October 8, 1816 – November 24, 1897) was an American businessman from Vermont. He played an important role in the manufacture of early American railroad steam locomotives.

== Biography ==
Blood was born in Weathersfield, Vermont, the son of Nathaniel Blood and Roxellana (Proctor) Blood. As a child he moved with his parents to Windsor, Vermont, where he attended the common schools. At the age of 17, as railroads began to be built in the United States, he was apprenticed as a blacksmith. After a few years learning the trade, he moved to Lowell, Massachusetts, where he was hired by the Locks and Canals Machine Shop. 1849 brought a new title to Blood at a different foundry, when he took the position of "job hand" at the Essex Machine Shop.

At the Essex Machine Shop Blood manufactured locomotive parts and he built up enough of a cash reserve that he was able to purchase a share of the Manchester Locomotive Works when it opened in 1853. Blood took over the shop superintendent position at Manchester in 1857 when the original superintendent, O. W. Bayley, left the company.

It was Blood's opinion that the locomotives that Manchester produced were too light for the future needs of the railroads. When he took over in 1857, he quickly instigated more substantial locomotive construction at the shop. Through succeeding years, Blood acquired greater principal in the company until he was the majority owner.

Under Blood's tenure, Manchester purchased the locomotive manufacturing business of Amoskeag Locomotive Works in 1859, and the fire engine manufacturing business from the same company in 1876. Blood died in 1897 in Manchester, New Hampshire, but Manchester Locomotive Works continued in his absence, building as many as 1,800 locomotives by 1901.

== Family life ==
Blood married Lavinia Kendall on September 4, 1845. They had two daughters, Elenora "Nora" (1849-1910) and Emma (1863-1932). His wife Lavinia founded the Manchester Women's Aid and Relief Society in 1875. Blood and his wife are both interred at Valley Cemetery in Manchester, New Hampshire, in one of the cemetery's 13 private mausoleums.

Blood's daughter Elenora married Amoskeag Manufacturing Company president Frank Pierce Carpenter. Upon her death in 1910, Carpenter donated funds for an elaborate new building for the city's public library. Emma married doctor L. Melville French in 1887. Along with her older sister, Emma was a benefactor of the Elliot Hospital with a focus on the maternity and children's ward. Emma also endowed a building for the Institute of Arts and Sciences. This building is known as French Hall and is next door to the Manchester City Library, her sister's memorial library building.
