= Union Saint-Jean-Baptiste d'Amérique =

Franco-American benefit society (e. 1899)

- Saint-Jean-Baptiste Society of America
- Merged into: Catholic Financial Life (1991)
- Established: 26 February 1899, de facto 7 May 1900, official
- Location: Woonsocket, Rhode Island, United States
- Region served: United States of America
- Archives and cultural documents donated to Assumption College, 2007-2013

The Union Saint-Jean-Baptiste d'Amérique (USJB), also referred to by its member organizations as the Société Saint-Jean-Baptiste d'Amérique (lit. "Saint-Jean-Baptiste Society of America"), was a Franco-American benefit society first organized in 1899 when the Saint-Jean-Baptiste Society of Holyoke (French: Société Saint-Jean-Baptiste d'Holyoke) invited several other so-named independent organizations to form a national committee, by 1929 the Boston Globe described it as the largest French Catholic fraternal organization in the United States.

== History ==
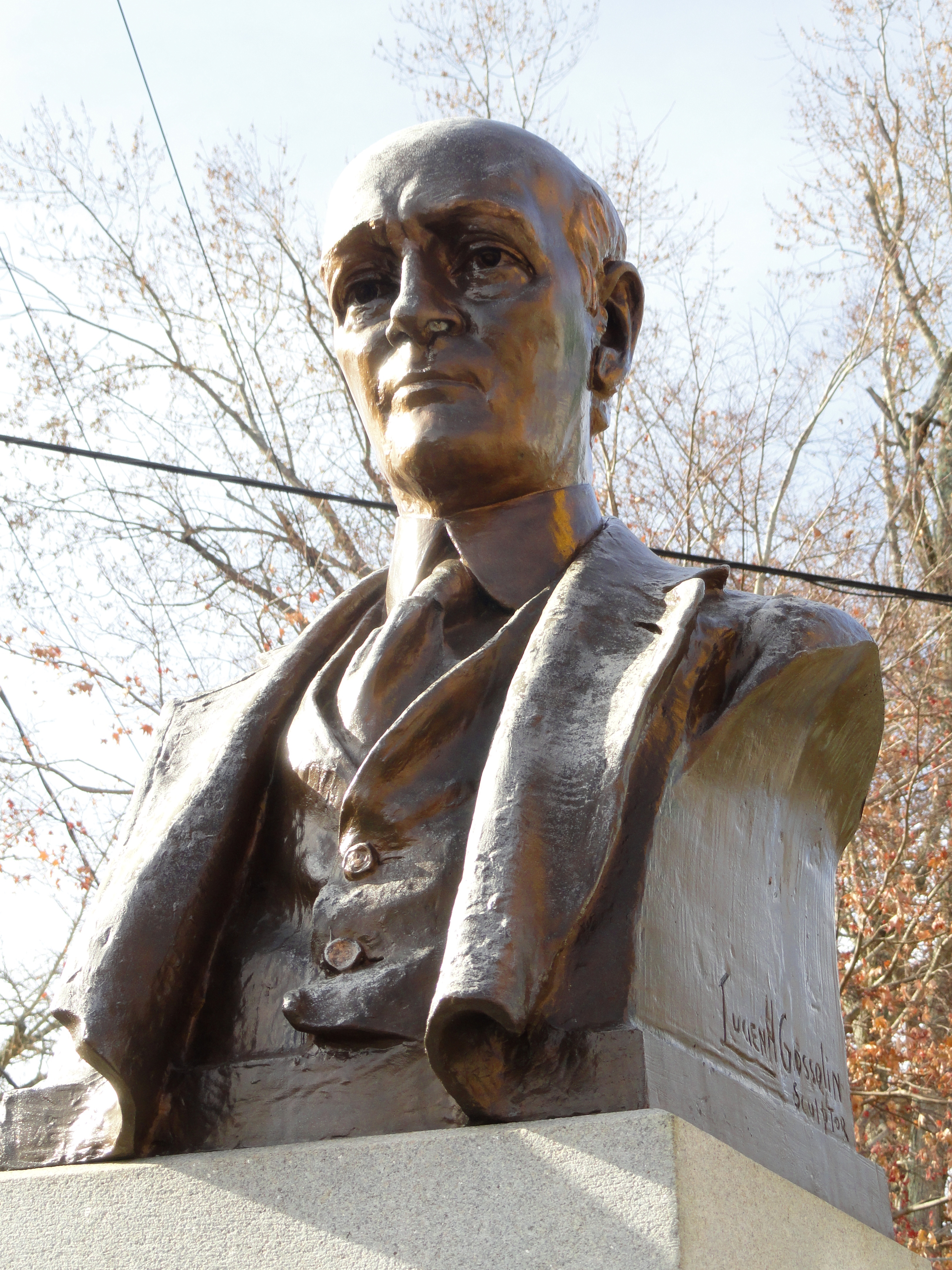
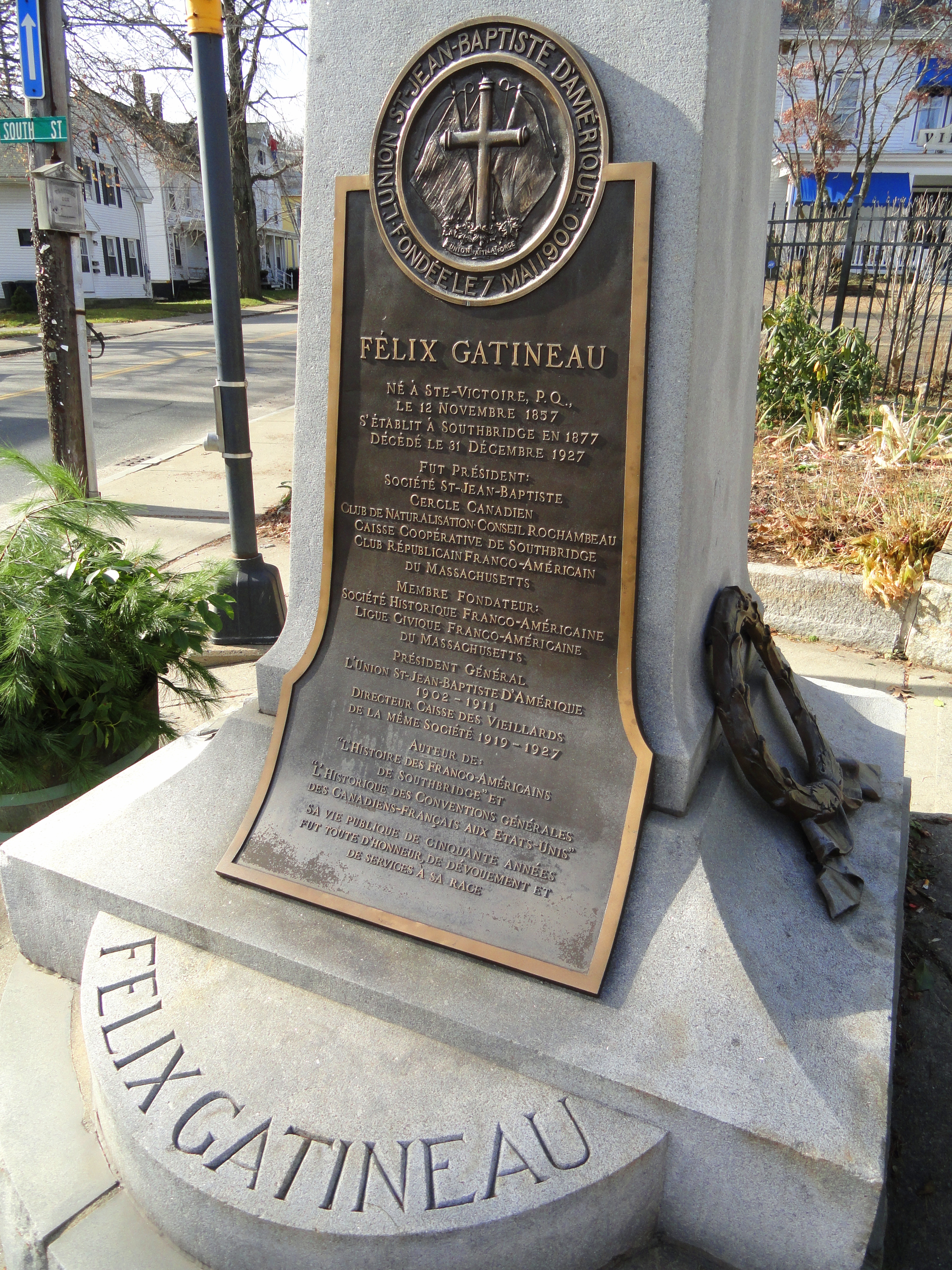
The Félix Gatineau Memorial in Southbridge, Massachusetts, by Lucien Gosselin, with the USJB ensign visible; Gatineau was an instrumental figure in the organization's founding, along with numerous affiliates

The society's first meeting was held on February 26, 1899; in the following year its first national congress was held on March 27, 1900, and the national organization was officially incorporated on May 7, 1900 in Woonsocket, Rhode Island. While L'Union was primarily formed for the purpose of creating sick, disability, and death funds for American French-speaking Catholics, the organization would also provide scholarships, civic education, and held cultural events including celebrations on Saint-Jean-Baptiste Day, parades, culinary and musical events, including French opera performances. The USJB also maintained a large collection of Franco-Americana that it purchased from the estate of American Civil War Major Edmond Mallet in 1908. Conducting the entirety of its business in French for most of its existence, in 1966 the organization became officially bilingual, adding English content to its bimonthly newsletter in 1972. After 1982, non-Catholics were granted membership, and from 1977 until its merger 1991, the Society held the Franco-American Interest in the Handicapped, known as Project FAITH, an annual seminar discussing advancements in the providing of care for the mentally and physically disabled. Other services included distribution of grants to French language programs at several colleges, guaranteed student loans, charter trips, and an annual pilgrimage language development program. Following a period of decline, the organization's mutual functions were merged with Catholic Financial Life in 1991.

=== Today ===
Although the mutual functions of the organization were folded into Catholic Family Life, a handful of chapters remained active in some form as recently as 2019. In New Britain, Connecticut there is the Societé St. Jean Baptiste, Inc., which continues to maintain a social club with a bar and billiard tables, open to all nationalities. Following the dissolution of its parent organization in 1991, a local chapter in Southbridge, Massachusetts, Union Saint-Jean-Baptiste, Chapter #12, began organizing trips for members and non-members to New York City and Boston, as well as Franco-American cultural events, such as hosting French Canadian singers at Southbridge's La Salle Reception Center.
