= Victory Park Historic District =

Historic district in New Hampshire, United States

- U.S. National Register of Historic Places
- U.S. Historic district
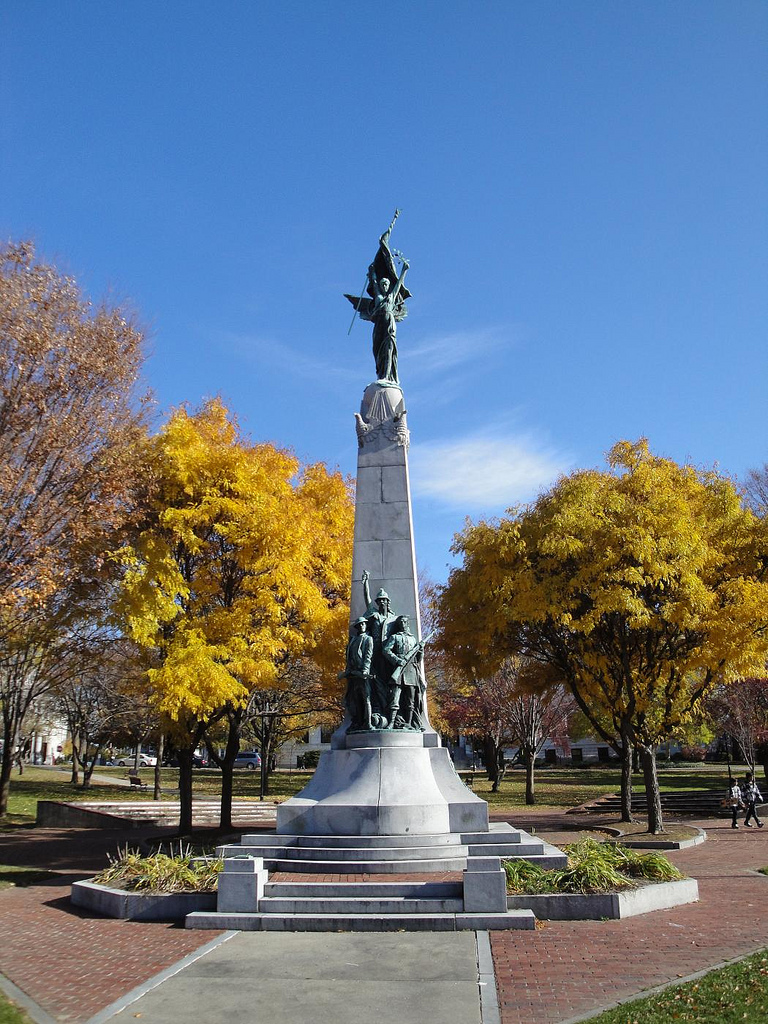
- Victory Park

- Location within New Hampshire Location within the United States
- Interactive map showing the location of Victory Park
- Location: 405 Pine, 148 Concord, 111 and 129 Amherst Sts., Manchester, New Hampshire
- Coordinates: 42°59′32″N 71°27′37″W
- Area: 5.5 acres (2.2 ha)
- Built: 1914
- Architect: Lucien Hippolyte Gosselin, William G. Rantoul; Edward Lippincott Tilton
- Architectural style: Classical Revival
- NRHP reference No.: 96000615
- Added to NRHP: June 3, 1996

The Victory Park Historic District of Manchester, New Hampshire, encompasses Victory Park, a city park laid out in 1838, and four buildings that face it across adjacent streets. Originally called Concord Square, Victory Park was laid out by the proprietors of the Amoskeag Manufacturing Company who founded Manchester, and was first used as a common area, used by abutters for gardening and grazing. The park was sold by the proprietors to the city for $1 in 1848, conditioned on making alterations that would transform it into a park. The city did not immediately act on the required conditions, but it had by the 1870s become more parklike, with a fountain and thickly-planted trees. The park was renamed after the First World War; its most prominent feature is the Winged Victory Monument to the city's soldiers in that war, designed by Lucien Hippolyte Gosselin and erected in 1929. The park underwent a major rehabilitation in 1988.

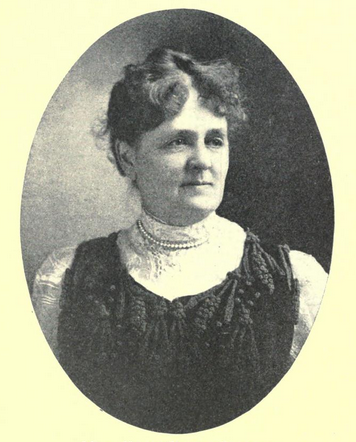
Emma Blood French

The district includes four buildings that face the park. The Manchester City Library (Carpenter Memorial Library), at 405 Pine Street, is a Beaux Arts structure built in 1914 and donated by Frank Carpenter in memory of his wife; it was designed by Edward Lippincott Tilton. At 148 Concord Street stands the 1916 Manchester Institute of Arts and Science building, designed by Boston architect William G. Rantoul and built as a gift of Emma Blood French, Frank Carpenter's sister-in-law. To the south of the park, at 129 Amherst Street, is the Classical Revival Manchester Historical Association building, also designed by Tilton. Finally, at 111 Amherst Street stands the Tilton-designed former post office building, built in 1932.

The district was listed on the National Register of Historic Places in 1996.

== See also ==
- National Register of Historic Places listings in Hillsborough County, New Hampshire
