= Heimer =

Heimer is a surname. Notable people with the surname include:

- Andrea Joyce Heimer (born 1981), American painter
- Andreas Heimer (born 1997), Danish footballer
- Carol Heimer (born 1951), professor of sociology
- Lennart Heimer (1930–2007), Swedish-American neuroscientist
- Željko Heimer (born 1971), Croatian vexillologist
