= Gary Samson =

American filmmaker and photographer

Gary Samson (born 1951) is a filmmaker and photographer known for his work in large format portraiture and his mastery of 19th century photographic techniques. He is currently an Emeritus Professor of Photography at the New Hampshire Institute of Art.

== Early life ==
Samson has stated in numerous interviews that his love of photography began with a summer job at the Manchester Historic Association as a teenager in his hometown of Manchester, New Hampshire. It was there that he learned to make contact prints from the glass-negative collection that documents the history of the Amoskeag Manufacturing Company and the city of Manchester.

== Career ==
Samson's life and work has been profiled in numerous publications, among them Take Magazine and the New Hampshire Union Leader. He has said about his work in photographic portraiture: "I see the process of creating a portrait as a collaboration between myself and the subject in the subject's familiar environment. That environment is an instrumental part of the portrait, revealing a facet of the subject's character."

Samson has exhibited in solo and group shows at the Vermont Center for Photography, the University of New Hampshire Museum, Cape Breton University Art Gallery, Addison Woolley Gallery, Panopticon Gallery, and elsewhere. His work is included in private and public collections including the Currier Museum of Art, the University of New Hampshire, and the National Archives in Washington, DC.

Samson has authored three books on New Hampshire history as well as contributed photographs for a half dozen more including books on Ghana, Cape Breton, Nova Scotia, and New Orleans. These include Talking New Orleans Music with Burt Feintuch and Ghana: an African Portrait Revisited with Peter E. Randall, et al.

Samson taught for many years at the New Hampshire Institute of Art (NHIA), beginning in 1981 as a faculty member and from 2001 until 2017, as Chair of NHIA's Photography Department.

In May 2017, Samson was named New Hampshire's Artist Laureate by Governor Chris Sununu. Upon his retirement from teaching in 2017, he was named Emeritus Professor of Photography at the New Hampshire Institute of Art.
