= Andrea Joyce Heimer =

American painter (born 1981)

Andrea Joyce Heimer (born 1981) is a painter whose narrative-base work draws inspiration from a re-examination of her own life growing up as an adopted child in Great Falls, Montana.

== Education ==
Primarily self-taught, Heimer earned her Master of Fine Arts (M.F.A.) in Visual Art in 2017 from the New Hampshire Institute of Art where she studied with painter Craig Stockwell.

== Career ==
Heimer has exhibited in shows at Nino Mier Gallery, Los Angeles; Half Gallery, New York City; Hometown, New York City; and Linda Hodges Gallery, Seattle, among others. Her work has been included in international shows at Almine Rech, Paris; Pinakotheke der Moderne, Munich; and Castlefield Gallery in Manchester. In 2017, Heimer was one of 55 artists selected to participate in the 15th Istanbul Biennial in Istanbul, Turkey. Her work has been written about in The Wall Street Journal, Art in America, Artforum, The New York Times, Vice, Riot Material, and The Huffington Post. Heimer was a 2019 recipient of the Joan Mitchell Foundation Painters & Sculptors Grants, a 2019 Betty Bowen Award finalist, and a 2018 Neddy Award finalist in painting, a 2015 recipient of the 5790projects Award, and a 2013 Neddy Award finalist in painting.
