= Lucinda Bliss =

American artist

Lucinda Bliss (born 1965 in Hartford, Connecticut) is an American artist, writer, and educator.

== Education ==
Bliss earned a Bachelor of Arts (B.A.) from Skidmore College in Art History in 1988 and a Master of Fine Arts (M.F.A.) in Visual Art from Vermont College in 1999.

== Career ==
Bliss currently serves as the Dean of the College of Arts & Media at the University of Colorado Denver. She served as the Associate Provost and Dean of Graduate Studies at Massachusetts College of Art and Design. She was previously Dean of Graduate Studies at the New Hampshire Institute of Art (NHIA) in Manchester, New Hampshire. Bliss’ teaching positions have included Professor of Liberal Studies in the undergraduate program of the Union Institute & University in Montpelier, VT, Assistant Professor at Colby College, and teaching at the Maine College of Art, the University of Southern Maine, and with the Crit Lab.

She has participated in solo and group exhibitions at Lamont Gallery on the campus of Phillips Exeter Academy, the Ogunquit Museum of American Art, Bates College Museum of Art, Tucson Museum of Art, the Brattleboro Museum, Aucocisco Gallery, Whitney Art Works, Center for Maine Contemporary Art, Boston Center for the Arts, Common Street Arts, The Ross Gallery in Charlotte, North Carolina, and Gallery 312 in Chicago, Illinois.

Bliss has been awarded numerous grants including support from the Kindling Fund for her project “Tracking the Border,” two Maine Arts Commission grants, and residencies at Ucross Foundation, the Virginia Center for the Creative Arts, Hewnoaks, Shotpouch Creek, Anderson Ranch Arts Center, and the Vermont Studio Center.

In addition to her work as a visual artist, Bliss also co-authored the limited edition chapbook Anatomy of Desire: the Daughter/Mother Sessions (Kore Press) with her mother, the poet and essayist Alison Hawthorne Deming. Her essay, “The Invisible Yoke” was part of the Marchxness online publication-competition for lovers of music and writing.
