= Kyle Mosher =

Canadian artist & designer (born 1985)

Kyle D. Mosher
- Born: Sherbrooke, Quebec, Canada
- Education: B.F.A. Illustration New Hampshire Institute of Art
- Known for: artists who works in Collage; Cut-paper; Multimedia; Graphic design Graffiti
- Awards: Society of Illustrators – Student Competition Winner, 2008

Kyle Mosher (born 1985) is a Canadian-born, Charlotte, North Carolina–based multidisciplinary artist and designer. His work spans murals, illustration, and painting, and he is known for combining fine art traditions with contemporary pop and street culture. While Mosher first gained recognition for his collage and cut-paper works, his practice has expanded to include large-scale public murals, commercial commissions, and illustrative projects. His murals can be found in Charlotte and other U.S. cities, and he is the founder of Paid For With Art, a creative brand and apparel line that emphasizes art as a cultural and economic driver.

== Artwork ==
Beginning in the mid-2010s, Mosher expanded his practice from collage into large-scale murals and public art projects. Based in Charlotte, North Carolina, he has completed a number of commissions for commercial and residential spaces in the city and throughout the Southeast.

In 2023, he completed a mural at the Presley Uptown apartments in Charlotte, designed to brighten and enliven the property’s leasing entrance and parking garage. Other Charlotte projects include commissions for hotels, multifamily developments, and local businesses.

Mosher’s murals often employ bold color palettes, geometric forms, and references to both classical painting and contemporary street culture. His public works have been cited as contributing to the city’s broader mural movement, which has been associated with neighborhood revitalization and community engagement.

Mosher’s work has evolved from his earlier collage and cut-paper practice into a multidisciplinary approach that includes murals, painting, and illustration. His style often employs bold color palettes, geometric forms, and loose, gestural lines that reflect both classical and contemporary influences.

While his early works incorporated found imagery and epigrams drawn from popular music, particularly hip-hop, his more recent projects emphasize large-scale public murals and illustrative compositions that merge fine art traditions with street culture aesthetics.

Critics and commentators have noted affinities with the post-impressionist explorations of Paul Cézanne as well as the gestural spontaneity of Cy Twombly. Mosher has also cited inspiration from modernists such as Picasso and Braque, alongside contemporary graphic practices.

== Early years ==
Before becoming an artist, Mosher was a competitive athlete who played hockey while attending Nashua High School in Nashua, New Hampshire. Plagued by injuries prior to leaving for college, Mosher decided to pursue art instead and enrolled at the New Hampshire Institute of Art (NHIA) in the illustration program. At NHIA, Mosher earned his Bachelor of Fine Arts (B.F.A.) in Illustration where he studied with Lynn Pauley. It was also at NHIA where Mosher first became inspired by Cézanne's observations of simple forms, Picasso's synthetic cubism, and Rauschenberg's mixed media collages.

While at NHIA, Mosher also had the opportunity to study in Florence, Italy, in 2007, at which point he started to combine cut-paper techniques into his illustrations. In 2008 his illustration "Audubon 2" was selected as one of 96 winning student works from around the country featured in an exhibit at the Society of Illustrators Gallery in New York City.

== Career ==
Mosher’s work has been shaped by his early connection to music, particularly hip-hop, which informed much of his mixed-media collage practice. In his current work, that sensibility has expanded into a broader visual language that incorporates large-scale murals, geometric abstraction, and loose illustrative lines. Rather than directly quoting song lyrics, his recent projects emphasize color, form, and art-historical references while maintaining the energy and cultural resonance of his earlier music-inspired works.

Mosher's commercial work is visually more literal. For example, a recent series entitled "The Portrait Series" features portraits of musicians created using his signature cut-paper and collage style.

Mosher's artwork has been featured in numerous online and print publications and for major clients including Forbes, Karmaloop, Highsnobiety, Mountain Dew's Green Label, Complex, Radeberger, Bud Light, Proteus Mag, the Phase Collective, bit FUUL mag, peculiar bliss, notofu, notpaper and get a candy. He has also been profiled on Juice Online, Perfectionist Wannabe, the Fearless Entrepreneur, and the Charlotte-based National Public Radio (NPR) station WFAE.

Kyle Mosher currently resides in Charlotte, North Carolina.
