= Jennifer Anne Gordon =

American horror author

- Born: New Hampshire
- Education: New Hampshire Institute of Art
- Occupations: Author, dancer, artist, podcaster
- Writing career
- Language: English
- Period: 2020–present
- Genre: Gothic horror
- Notable awards: Kindle Award for Best Horror/Suspense (2020); Best Horror 2020 from Authors on the Air; Finalist for the American Book Fest’s Best Book Award in Horror (2020); Platinum 5 Star Seal from Readers Favorite
- Website: www.jenniferannegordon.com/books

Jennifer Anne Gordon is an American Gothic horror and speculative fiction author.

== Early life ==
Jennifer Anne Gordon was born and raised in New Hampshire.

== Personal life ==
Jennifer Anne Gordon lives in New Hampshire with her partner.

== Bibliography ==
- Beautiful, Frightening, and Silent (2020)
- From Daylight to Madness (The Hotel # 1) (2020)
- When the Sleeping Dead Still Talk (The Hotel # 2) (2020)
- Victoriana: Mixed Media Art (2020)
- Pretty/Ugly (2021)
- The Japanese Box and Other Stories (2023)

== Awards and honors ==
The Reader's House magazine cover (2021)

- Kindle Award for Best Horror/Suspense (2020)
- Best Horror 2020 from Authors on the Air
- Lit Nastie Award for 2024 for Best Short Story
- 2022 Helicon Award for Best Horror
