= Alison Hawthorne Deming =

American poet, essayist and teacher (born 1946)

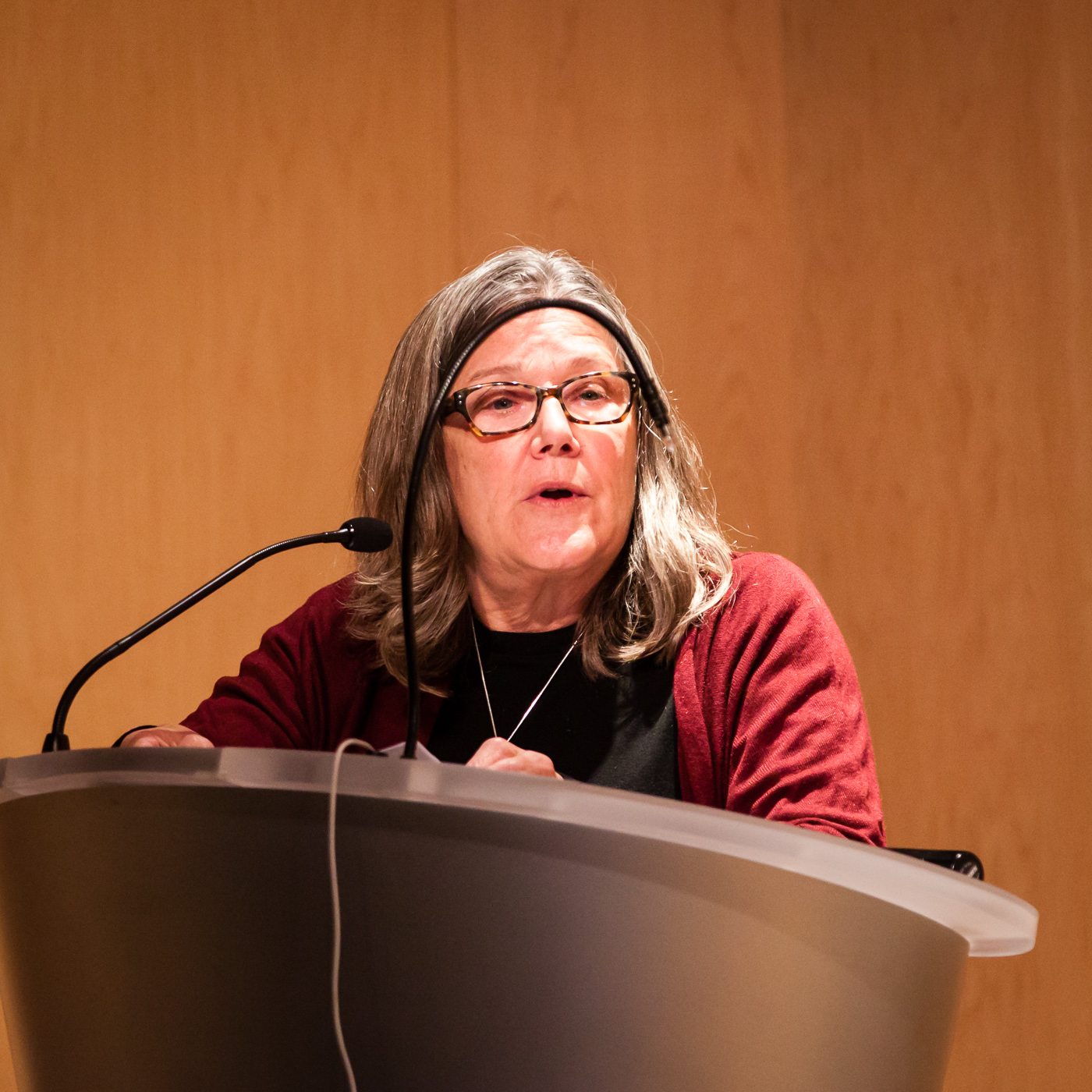
- Born: 1946 (age 79–80); Hartford, Connecticut, US
- Awards: 2015 Guggenheim Fellowship

Academic background
- Education: Vermont College of Fine Arts

Academic work
- Discipline: creative writing
- Sub-discipline: poetry
- Institutions: University of Arizona

Alison Hawthorne Deming (b. 1946 Hartford, Connecticut) is an American poet, essayist and teacher, former Agnese Nelms Haury Chair in Environment and Social Justice and currently Regents Professor Emerita in Creative Writing at the University of Arizona. She received a 2015 Guggenheim Fellowship. She has two books out in 2025: the poetry collection "Blue Flax & Yellow Mustard Flower" (Red Hen Press) and the anthology "The Gift of Animals: Poems of Love, Loss, & Connection" (Storey Press). She received a 2021-24 Fellowship from the Borchard Foundation.

== Life ==
Deming was born and grew up in Connecticut. She is a great-granddaughter of Nathaniel Hawthorne. She worked in health care for fifteen years, including a decade with Planned Parenthood. In 1983 she received a Master of Fine Arts in Poetry from Vermont College of Fine Arts. She has also been a Wallace Stegner Fellow at Stanford University and a Fellow at the Fine Arts Work Center, Provincetown, Massachusetts. She received two fellowships from the National Endowment for the Arts. In 1990 she became Director of the University of Arizona Poetry Center, where she served until 2002, also teaching in the University of Arizona Creative Writing Program. She was Distinguished Visiting Writer at the University of Hawaiʻi at Mānoa in 1997 and has taught in many venues including the Prague Summer Program, Bread Loaf Environmental Writer's Workshop, University of Montana Environmental Writing Institute, Taos Summer Writer's Conference, Indiana University Writers' Conference and many other venues. She served as poet-in-residence at the Jacksonville Zoo and Gardens in Florida as part of the Language of Conservation Project for Poet's House. She has had residencies at the Yaddo, Djeraasi Resident Artist's Program, The Mesa Refuge, The Island Institute in Sitka, Alaska, Hawthornden International Retreat for Writers, The Hermitage Artists Retreat and the H. J. Andrews Experimental Forest among others. Her new nonfiction book "A Woven World: On Fashion, Fishermen, and the Sardine Dress" was published by Counterpoint Press in 2021.

She has taught at the University of Arizona since 1990 and was appointed Agnes Nelms Haury Chair in 2014. She lives in Tucson, Arizona and Grand Manan, New Brunswick, Canada. Her daughter is the artist Lucinda Bliss.

== Awards ==
- 2021-2024 Borchard Foundation Fellowship
- 2015 Guggenheim Fellowship
- 2015 Essay in Best American Science and Nature Writing
- 2014 Senior Fellow, Spring Creek Project, Department of Philosophy, Oregon State University
- 2010 Best Essay Gold, GAMMA Awards, Magazine Association of the Southeast, essay in The Georgie Review
- 2007 Essay in Best American Science and Nature Writing
- 1998 Bayer Award in Science Writing, Creative Nonfiction
- 1998 Finalist, PEN Center West Award for Creative Nonfiction, for The Edges of the Civilized World
- 1995 Poetry Fellowship, National Endowment for the Arts
- 1994 Walt Whitman Award of the Academy of American Poets selected by Gerald Stern
- 1993 Pushcart Prize (nonfiction), Pushcart Press
- 1992 Gertrude B. Claytor Memorial Award, Poetry Society of America, New York, NY
- 1990 Poetry Fellowship, National Endowment for the Arts
- 1983 Pablo Neruda Prize from Nimrod

== Works ==
Deming's work has been widely published and anthologized including in Ecotone, Orion, The Georgia Review, terrain.org, OnEarth, Scientific American, Ploughshares, Kenyon Review, Parthenon West, Hawk and Handsaw, Sierra, Gnosis, American Poetry Review, Eleven Eleven, Western Humanities Review, The Massachusetts Review, Cutthroat, "Verse and Universe: Poems on Science and Mathematics," "The Norton Book of Nature Writing" and Best American Science and Nature Writing.

=== Poetry ===
- Blue Flax & Yellow Mustard Flower (poems). Red Hen Press. 2025. ISBN 9781636282305.
- Stairway to Heaven (poems). Penguin Poets. 2016. ISBN 9781101992128.
- Death Valley: Painted Light (poems). George F. Thomson. 2016. ISBN 978-1-938086-37-3.
- Rope (poems). Penguin Poets. 2009. ISBN 978-0-14-311636-3.
- Genius Loci (poems). Penguin Poets. 2005. ISBN 978-0-14-303520-6.
- The Monarchs: A Poem Sequence. Baton Rouge: Louisiana State University Press. 1997. ISBN 978-0-8071-2230-3.
- Girls in the Jungle: What Does it Take for a Woman to Survive as an Artist?. Kore Press. 1995. ISBN 978-1-888553-02-4.
- Science and Other Poems. Baton Rouge: Louisiana State University Press. 1994. ISBN 978-0-8071-1914-3.

=== Essays ===
- A Woven World: On Fashion, Fishermen, and the Sardine Dress, Berkeley, CA, Counterpoint Press, 2021, ISBN 9781640094826
- Zoologies: On Animals and the Human Spirit, Minneapolis, Milkweed Editions, 2014, ISBN 978-1-57131-348-5
- Writing the Sacred into the Real, Minneapolis: Milkweed Editions, Credo Series, 2001, ISBN 1-57131-249-8
- Field Notes on Hands. Monograph Series #21. Haystack Mountain School of Crafts. 2007. Archived from the original on 2009-04-24.
- The Edges of the Civilized World. New York: St. Martin's/Picador USA. 1998. ISBN 978-0-312-19543-4.
- Temporary Homelands. New York: Mercury House. 1994. ISBN 978-1-56279-062-2.

=== Anthologies Edited ===
- Alison Hawthorne Deming, ed. (2025). The Gift of Animals: Poems of Love, Loss, & Connection. Storey Press. ISBN 9781635868562.
- Alison Deming and Lauret E. Savoy, ed. (2002). The Colors of Nature: Essays on Culture, Identity and the Natural World. Minneapolis: Milkweed Editions. ISBN 978-1-57131-267-9.Revised and expanded edition, 2011.
- Alison Hawthorne Deming, ed. (1996). Poetry of the American West: A Columbia Anthology. New York: Columbia University Press. ISBN 0-231-10386-7.
