= Félix Gatineau =

American politician

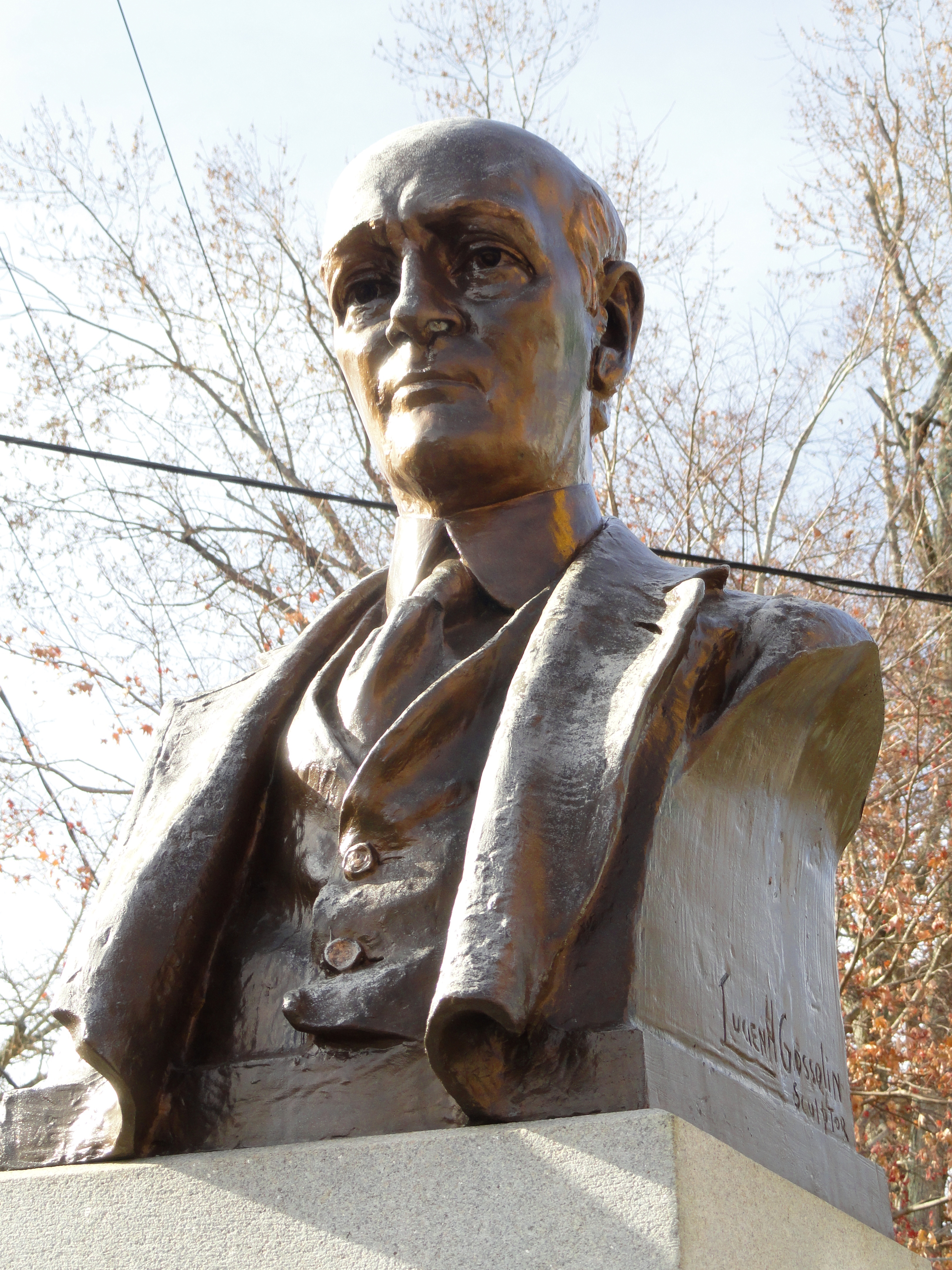
Likeness of Felix in the bust at the corner of Main St and South Street, Southbridge, by Lucien Gosselin

Félix Gatineau (November 12, 1857 – December 21, 1927) was a French-Canadian statesman and historian in his adopted hometown of Southbridge, Massachusetts. He was born in Sainte-Victoire-de-Sorel, Quebec, an area halfway between Montreal and Quebec City. Gatineau arrived in Southbridge in 1877. Among his many deeds, he was a state representative in Massachusetts in 1906, 1920–21, and 1927, and led several French-Canadian societies. His written works include L'Histoire des Franco-Américains de Southbridge and L'Historique des Conventions Générales des Canadiens-Français aux Etats-Unis.

A statue was erected in his honour and dedicated on September 1, 1927, at a fork in a main road in Southbridge by the Union Saint-Jean-Baptiste d’Amérique, as he was one of the society's founders.

== See also ==
- 1921–1922 Massachusetts legislature
- 1927–1928 Massachusetts legislature
