= Beautiful, Frightening, and Silent =

2020 horror novel by Jennifer Anne Gordon

- Title page of the first edition
- Author: Jennifer Anne Gordon
- Audio read by: Aaron Smith
- Language: English
- Genre: Thriller, mystery, suspense
- Publisher: Livre Maison
- Publication date: August 1, 2020
- Publication place: United States
- Media type: Paperback, e-book, audiobook
- Pages: 237
- ISBN: 978-1735402130

Beautiful, Frightening, and Silent is a gothic horror novel by Jennifer Anne Gordon.

== Production ==
The kindle edition of the book was published on February 24, 2020 by publisher Breaking Rules Publishing.

== Reception ==
Prairies Book Review called the book "an exhilarating story packed with magnificently complex characters, psychological intrigue, and horror.

== Awards ==
Beautiful, Frightening, and Silent gained several awards including the 2020 Winner for Horror/Suspense Book for the Kindle Book Award and Finalist for the Best Book Awards by the American Book Fest.
