= The Colors of Nature =

2011 book edited by Alison H. Deming and Lauret E. Savoy

The Colors of Nature: Culture, Identity, and the Natural World
- First edition
- Editor: Alison H. Deming and Lauret E. Savoy
- Language: English
- Subject: Nature writing
- Published: 2011
- Publisher: Milkweed Editions
- Publication place: United States
- Media type: Print
- Pages: 352
- ISBN: 978-1571313195

The Colors of Nature: Culture, Identity, and the Natural World is a 2011 book edited by Alison H. Deming and Lauret E. Savoy. The book is a collection of essays from authors representing diverse backgrounds, including Japanese American, Mestizo, African American, Hawaiian, Arab American, Chicano and Native American. Collectively, the editors use these essays as a backdrop for exploring a deeper issue: the seeming paucity of nature writing by people of color, while writing about their own personal connections to (and disconnections from) nature.
