= Emma Blood French =

American philanthropists

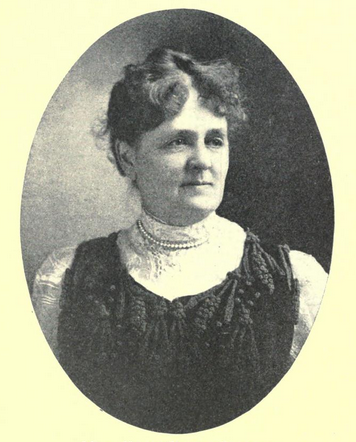
- Born: October 15, 1853; Manchester, New Hampshire, U.S.
- Died: September 23, 1932 (aged 78); Hampton, New Hampshire, U.S.
- Resting place: Valley Cemetery
- Occupation: philanthropist
- Spouse: Leonard Melville French
- Father: Aretas Blood

Emma Blood French (October 15, 1853 – September 23, 1932) was an American philanthropist. She was the patroness of the New Hampshire Institute of Art.

== Early life and family ==
French was born Emma Blood on October 15, 1853, in Manchester, New Hampshire. She was the daughter of prominent businessman Aretas Blood and Lavinia Kendall Blood. She had one sister, Elenora.

== Philanthropy ==
French was prominent in women's circles throughout New Hampshire. She was a member of the Daughters of the American Revolution and the Rye Beach Garden Club. French served as president of the Women's Aid and Relief home that was built by her parents. She also served as director of the Manchester District Nursing Association, as honorary vice president of the New Hampshire Tuberculosis Association, organizer of the Shakespeare Club, president of a local Colonial Dames of America chapter.

She was a patroness of the New Hampshire Institute of Art and built and endowed French Hall on the institute's campus in Victory Park. She was quoted saying that the school would be "a place for lectures, concerts, art exhibits, film presentations and most importantly, learning at affordable cost to virtually anyone who wanted to take advantage of the schools offerings."

French donated wards at Elliot Hospital and at the Franklin Street Church parish house.

== Personal life and death ==
She was married to Dr. L. Melville French.

French died on September 23, 1932, in her summer home at Little Boar's Head in North Hampton, New Hampshire.
