= Manchester City Library =

Library in Manchester, New Hampshire

Coordinates: 42°59′32″N 71°27′31″W

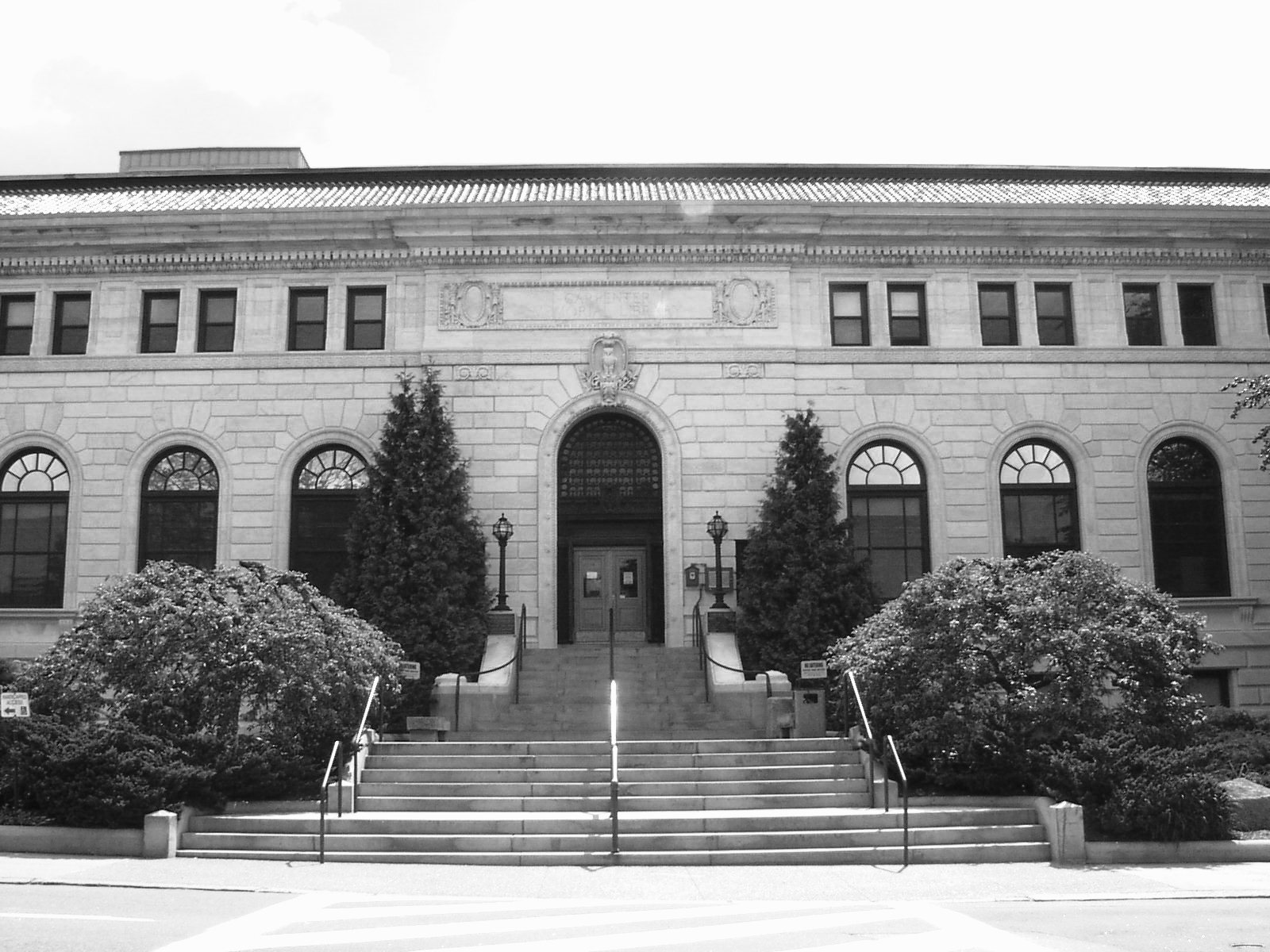
- The Main Branch in the Carpenter Memorial Building
- Location: 405 Pine Street, Manchester, New Hampshire
- Established: 08 November 1854
- Architects: Edward L. Tilton; Edgar A.P. Newcomb
- Branches: 2

Collection
- Items collected: 350,000

Other information
- Director: Denise van Zanten
- Parent organization: City of Manchester
- Affiliation: Greater Manchester Integrated Library Consortial System
- Website: www.manchester.lib.nh.us

The Manchester City Library was established in the mid-1850s, and serves the population of Manchester, the largest city in the state of New Hampshire. It is one of twelve libraries in the GMILCS consortium (Greater Manchester Integrated Library Consortial System) that provides materials and services to the greater Manchester area, and is on the U.S. Department of Interior's National Register of Historic Places, listed under the Victory Park Historic District as a contributing property, one of the four buildings that face the park. Even though the current building was completed in 1914, library services were provided as early as 1844 through a membership-based organization known as the Manchester Atheneum, and then as a public library which was housed in two other buildings. Over the last century, the library has undergone many renovations to maintain the historical integrity of the building. It has continuously provided materials in various formats (print, digital, and multimedia), as well as vital services to the public, including internet access, literacy programs, community events, and educational workshops and classes.

== History ==
The idea of a free public library for Manchester was first proposed in 1854 by Mayor-Elect Frederick Smyth during his inaugural speech. Prior to this, registered members in the area used the Manchester Atheneum between 1844 and 1854.

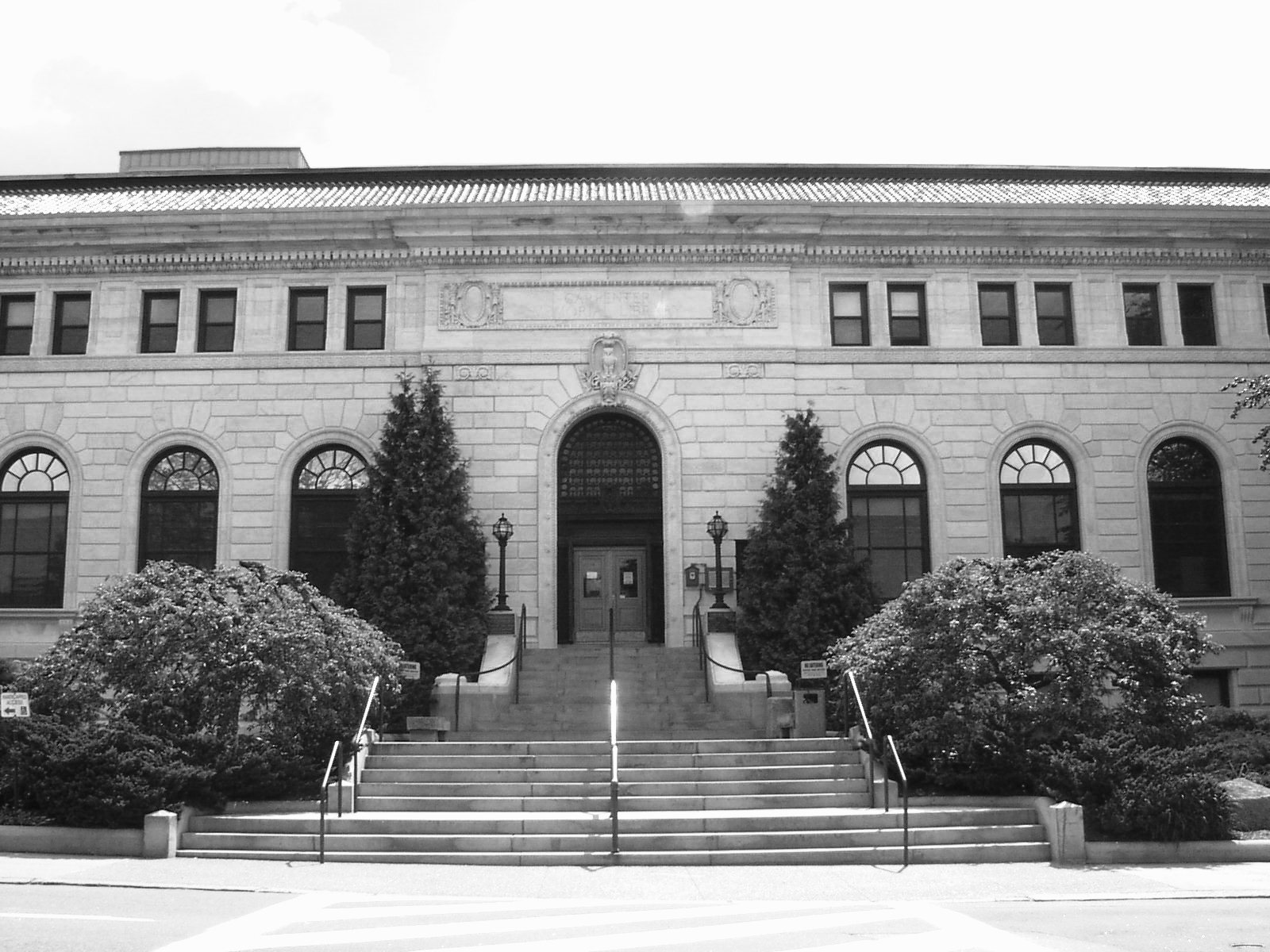
Front entrance of the Manchester City Library (Carpenter Memorial Building) in 2006

=== Atheneum (1844-1854) ===
The Atheneum was formed in 1844, and consisted of a library, reading room, and museum. Its organizers consisted of eight members including a president, vice president, three directors, secretary, treasurer, and a librarian. The organization was sustained for ten years by the monetary donations of benefactors, and book donations by association members. It wasn't free or public, but rather, belonged to the shareholders. However, individuals could gain access by paying a $3.00 annual fee.

=== Patten Block (1854-1871) ===
Once the public library proposal was suggested by Mayor Smyth, the Atheneum's collection was officially transferred to the city's possession on September 6, 1854, and was housed at 6 Patten Block off Elm Street, next to City Hall. It officially opened to the public November 8, 1854, with Francis B. Eaton as Head Librarian. His salary was $315.50 per year. The collection started with fewer than 200 volumes.

With a steadily growing population after its opening, the library was doing extremely well, building its collection up to 3,000 books, until tragedy struck in 1856 on the morning of February 5. A fire originating from the printing press in the basement of the building completely destroyed the library with the exception of 600 items (including those that were checked out). After much work by the trustees, a temporary location was set up at Smyth's Block on July 22, 1856, for one year, until Patten's Block was rebuilt in 1857. However, in less than two decades, that location also became too small, and a new building was erected on Franklin Street in 1871.

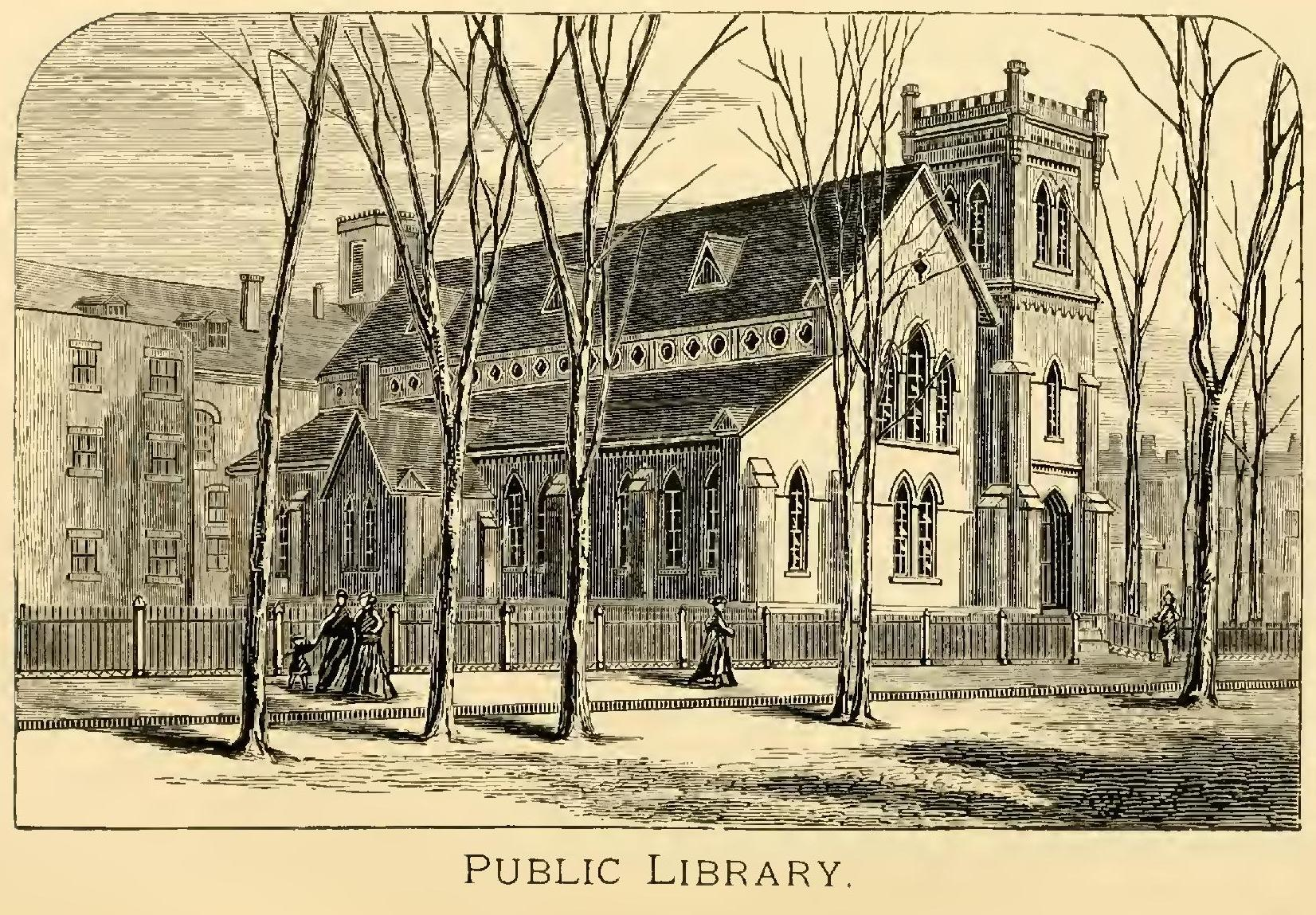
Public Library circa 1875

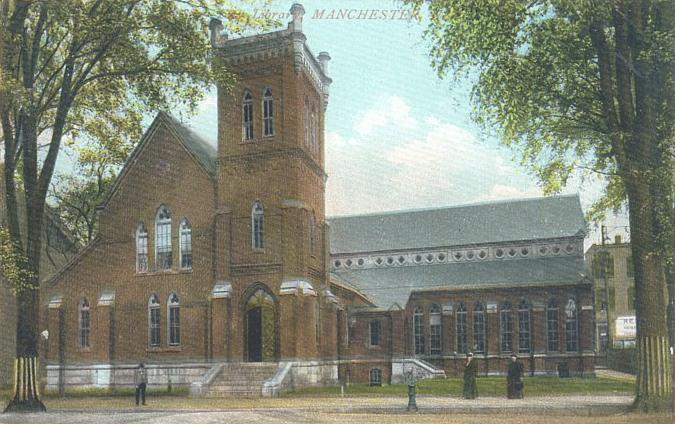
Franklin Street Building

=== Franklin Street Building (1871-1914) ===
The lot on which the Franklin Street building was erected was donated by the Amoskeag Manufacturing Company. The library had a dark, dingy, ecclesiastical feel to it which many patrons did not enjoy. In particular, the high wire fence that separated patrons from the bookshelves was an issue of discontent. Only ministers and teachers could browse the stacks as they pleased, but they still needed a librarian to retrieve any requested items for them, due to fragile step ladders. At times, patrons would have to wait up to an hour to have their items retrieved. Furthermore, if the items retrieved happened to be ones that were already read, or unwanted, patrons could not return them on the same day. Only one or two items could be checked out at a time, and daily fines were relative to the size of the books, as was the checkout period.

Eventually, a small open shelf was created in 1901 so patrons could have access to certain general interest books. Although patrons enjoyed this new addition, it caused some issues for staff as the number of missing items increased dramatically within one year. As a result, inventories were taken one to two times a year while all books were asked to be returned, and the library was shut down during this time.

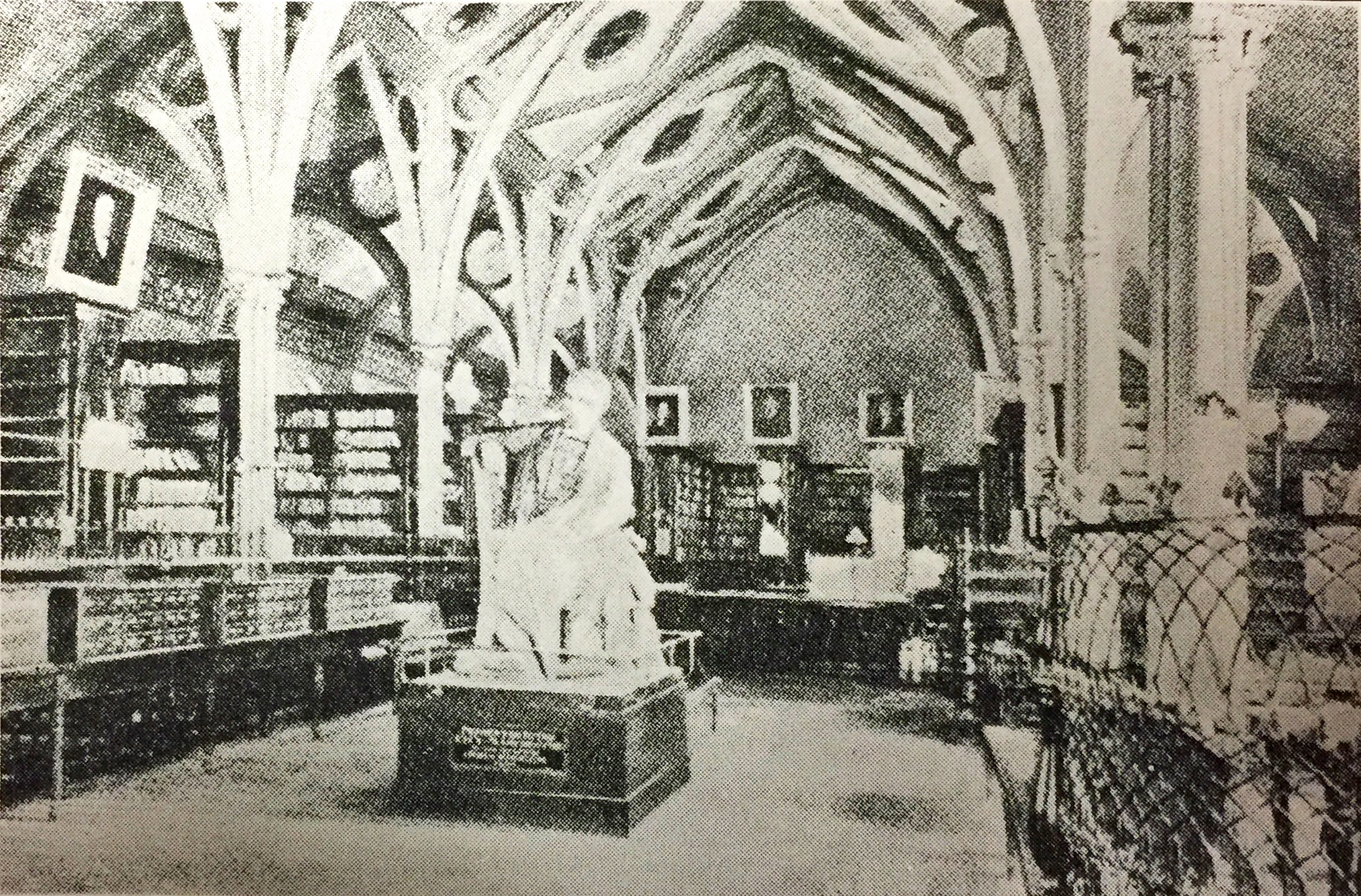
Railings separating shelved books from patrons

The Franklin Street location was not without its problems. Patrons complained about only being able to check out books on the day of the week they were assigned. This practice was abolished in 1880.

In 1881, an addition was built, which doubled the library's capacity. This also allowed more space for federal documents, since Judge Daniel Clark declared the library a federal depository site in 1884. Early catalogs were compiled by the trustees as books, after which they switched to a dictionary card catalog in 1894. These cards contained the author, title, subject, and form of the books, and were listed in alphabetical order. Books were placed on the shelves in a "fixed location" which was indicated on its card, as well as a number on the shelf, but they were not grouped by subject. As a result, if they were moved to another shelf, the numbers became useless. Eventually, that same year, the library was rearranged and classified by the Cutter Expansive Classification system, which grouped the books together by subject, and the number assigned to each remained permanent. Staff began using Library of Congress cards in 1902. The first children's card catalog was created in 1906, but it wasn't until 1907 that the age limit restricting children from officially using the library was abolished. However, there was still no dedicated Children's Room at that point. Last, but not least, one of the most troublesome issues faced occurred in 1908, when there was an infestation of termites in many books, documents, and even the oak posts of the building. Once cement floors were put down, however, the problem was eradicated.

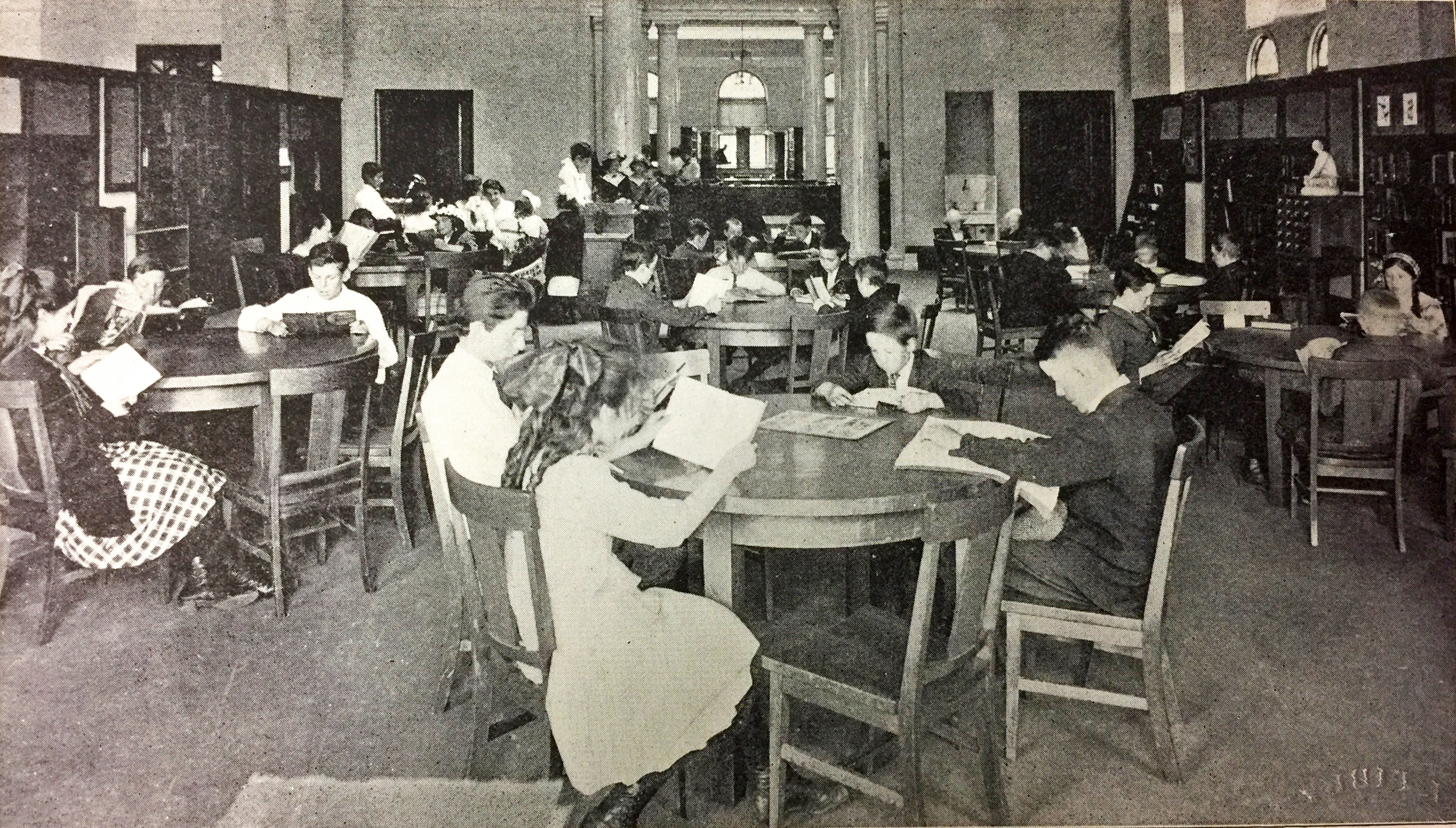
First Children's Room for the Carpenter Memorial Building (Manchester City Library)

=== Branches aka "Stations" ===
As the population grew, patrons became reluctant to travel more than half a mile for books. Consequently, "stations" (i.e., small branches) were opened up around the city. The first branch opened in East Manchester at the drug store of Charles G. Dunnington on May 28, 1912, and operated once a week, while the second one opened in West Manchester one year later in the drug store of Charles R. Leckie. This location also operated only once a week. But limited space proved challenging, and eventually space was rented out in both the East and West sides at 374 Massabesic Street, and 15 North Main Street, respectively, with a library assistant in charge. Over the years between 1914 and 1928, three other small spaces at schools and local stores functioned as stations as well.

== Carpenter Memorial Building (1914-present) ==
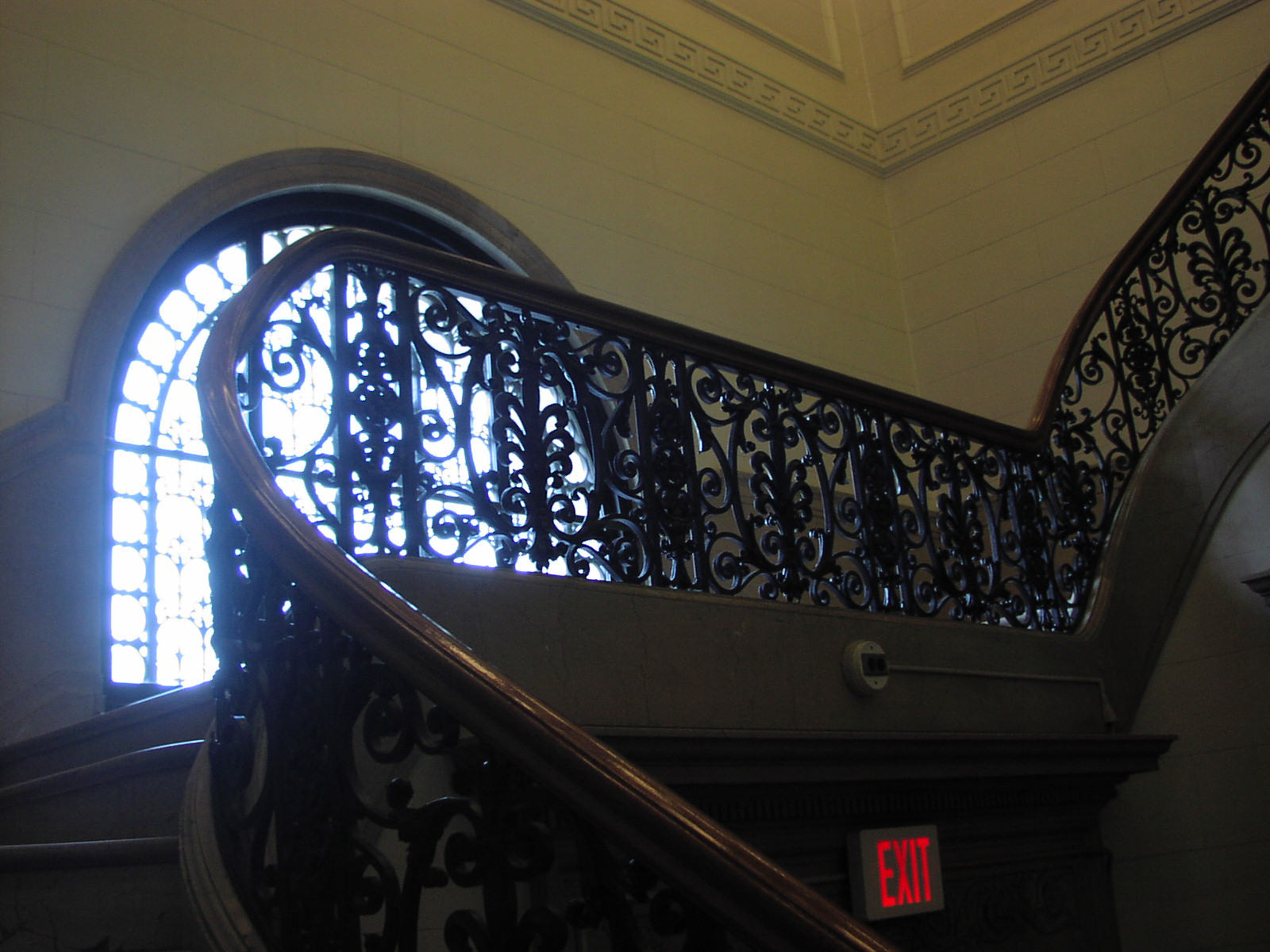
Intricate ironwork staircase in the main building of the Manchester City Library

Due to a continuously growing population, library collection, and the need for a separate children's room, it became evident that a new facility would be needed once again. Upon the death of his wife, Elenora Blood Carpenter, in 1910, Frank P. Carpenter, the president of the Amoskeag Paper Mill, offered to construct a new building in her honor.

Ground was broken in September 1912, and the cornerstone, a five-ton block of Concord granite coming from the same quarry that supplied the Library of Congress, was laid by Carpenter on June 11, 1913. Within the stone was a copper receptacle that served as a time capsule; it held records, newspapers, coins, clothes manufactured in Manchester, and other historical items. The foundation was prepared by the R.H. Howes Company of New York, and construction contract was given to F.G. Fearon & Co. of New York.

The new Italian Renaissance-style building, which was 150 feet long and 90 feet deep, took two years to complete by architects Edgar A.P. Newcomb of Honolulu and Edward L. Tilton of New York City. They incorporated Concord granite, Botticino and Lastavena marble, as well as oak woodwork, brick, concrete, plaster, and steel beams into the construction, as well as a beautiful skylight dome in its rotunda. The cost to build the library was approximately $355,000 ($11.4 million in 2025 dollars). The 42,000-square-foot (3,900 m^{2}) building, which still serves the population of Manchester, was officially dedicated on November 18, 1914, in front of a crowd of more than 5,000 people, and could now accommodate more than 300,000 materials.

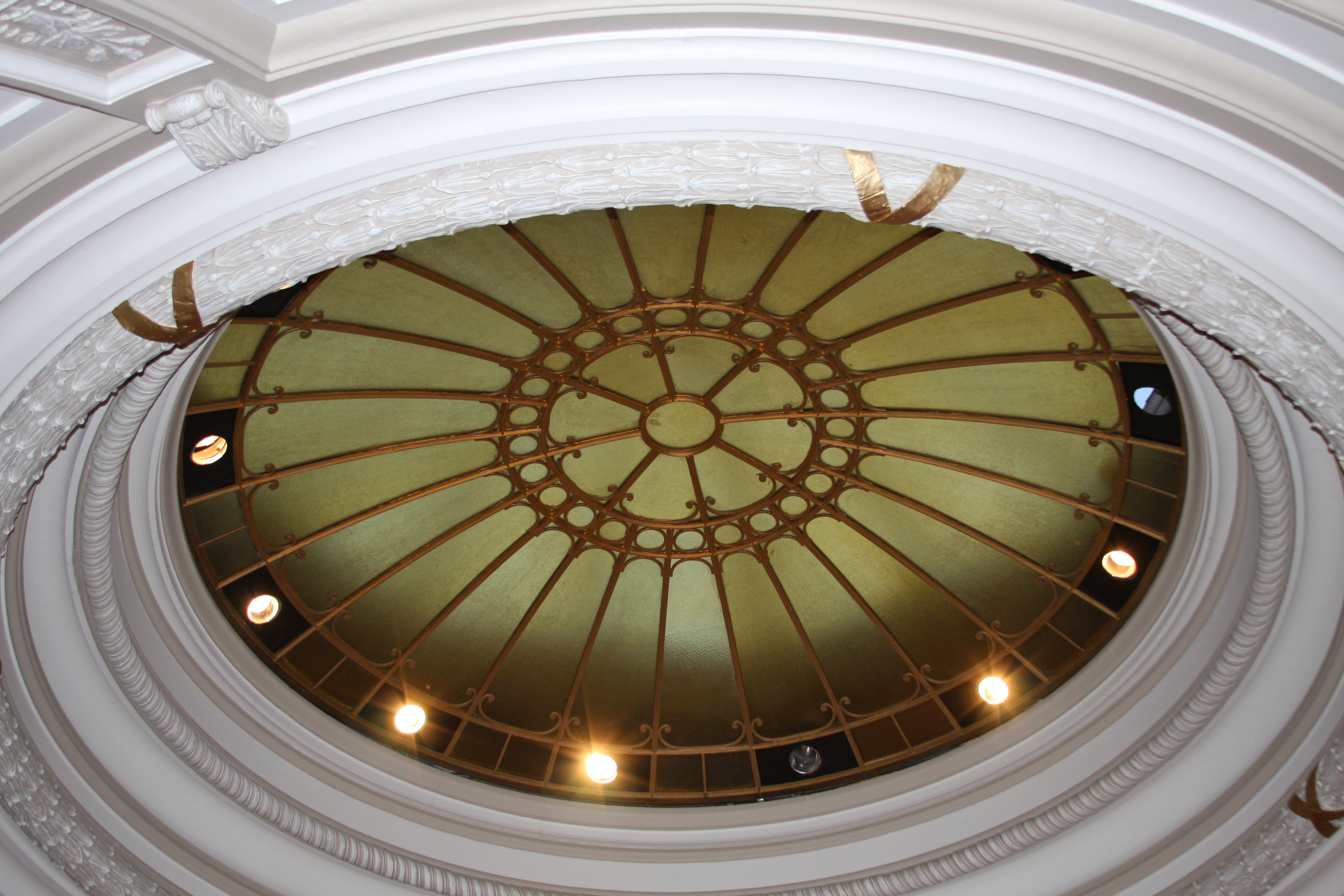
Rotunda dome of the Manchester City Library

The dedication program contained musical selections by the First Regiment Band, an invocation by Rev. Thomas Chalmers, D.D., a main address by Samuel D. Felker (then governor of New Hampshire), and a dedicatory oration by Rev. Burton W. Lockhart, D.D. During the period of transition from the Franklin Street Building to the Carpenter Memorial Building, the library was closed for 15 working days, during which time they transferred 74,000 books from one location to the other, beginning on the day of the dedication, and ending on December 7, 1914, when the doors opened to the public.

In 1929, the library celebrated its 75th anniversary. During this time, a history of the library was written and privately printed.

During World War II while there was increased patronage, the library held a "Victory Book Campaign" and collected donations from the community to ship to the armed forces overseas. But as a result of efforts to conserve oil, and an undue strain placed on library assistants who had to work additional evening hours, the trustees voted to change regular operational hours on Wednesdays from 9 am to 1 pm, instead of the regular hours of 9 am to 9 pm, for the first time in 30 years. This, however, proved to be unpopular with the public, who brought the issue to Mayor Benoit. As a result, a new schedule was implemented at the start of 1946, changing the hours on Monday to 1 pm - 9 pm, and on Wednesdays, 9 am - 6 pm.

Some other noteworthy events are as follows:

- 1929: The 75th anniversary of the library was celebrated; a history was written and privately printed in commemoration of the event
- 1934: Library closes on Sundays
- 1953: Bookmobile service inaugurated
- 1955: Large Print books are added to the collection
- 1963: First photocopy machine in use
- 1984: Bookmobile bought by local company for other usage
- 1989: Library cards with barcodes are first issued
- 1994: Began using Dynix online catalog for in-house use
- 1996: Public internet stations arrive; library catalog goes online to the public
- 1998: West Branch awarded the NH Preservation Alliance Award
- 2005: New teen area created
- 2006: NH Downloadable books (e-books) become available; Hunt Grant used to install wireless internet access at both buildings
- 2007: Main building is awarded the NH Preservation Alliance Award for renovations
- 2008: Automated checkout system is upgraded to Polaris to provide better access for patrons to their records
- 2009: Open holds system through the GMILCS consortium allows for materials to be requested and shared by patrons between libraries in the area
- 2010: West Branch celebrates 30 years of service
- 2011: New security gates added
- 2013: 3M e-book service added as a GMILCS libraries offering
- 2014: 100th Anniversary of the Carpenter Memorial Building
- 2015: Flood at the West Branch on the evening of February 16 due to a burst sprinkler pipe; security cameras installed at Main Library
- 2016: West Branch reopens on May 2
- 2017: Main library closed to the public in January for two weeks during flooring renovations then reopened January 30; library begins offering Zinio online magazine service in April
- 2020: Due to the COVID-19 Pandemic, the library closed for a period of time, transferring services to online and later contactless pickups. The library also installed glass barriers at all public service desks.

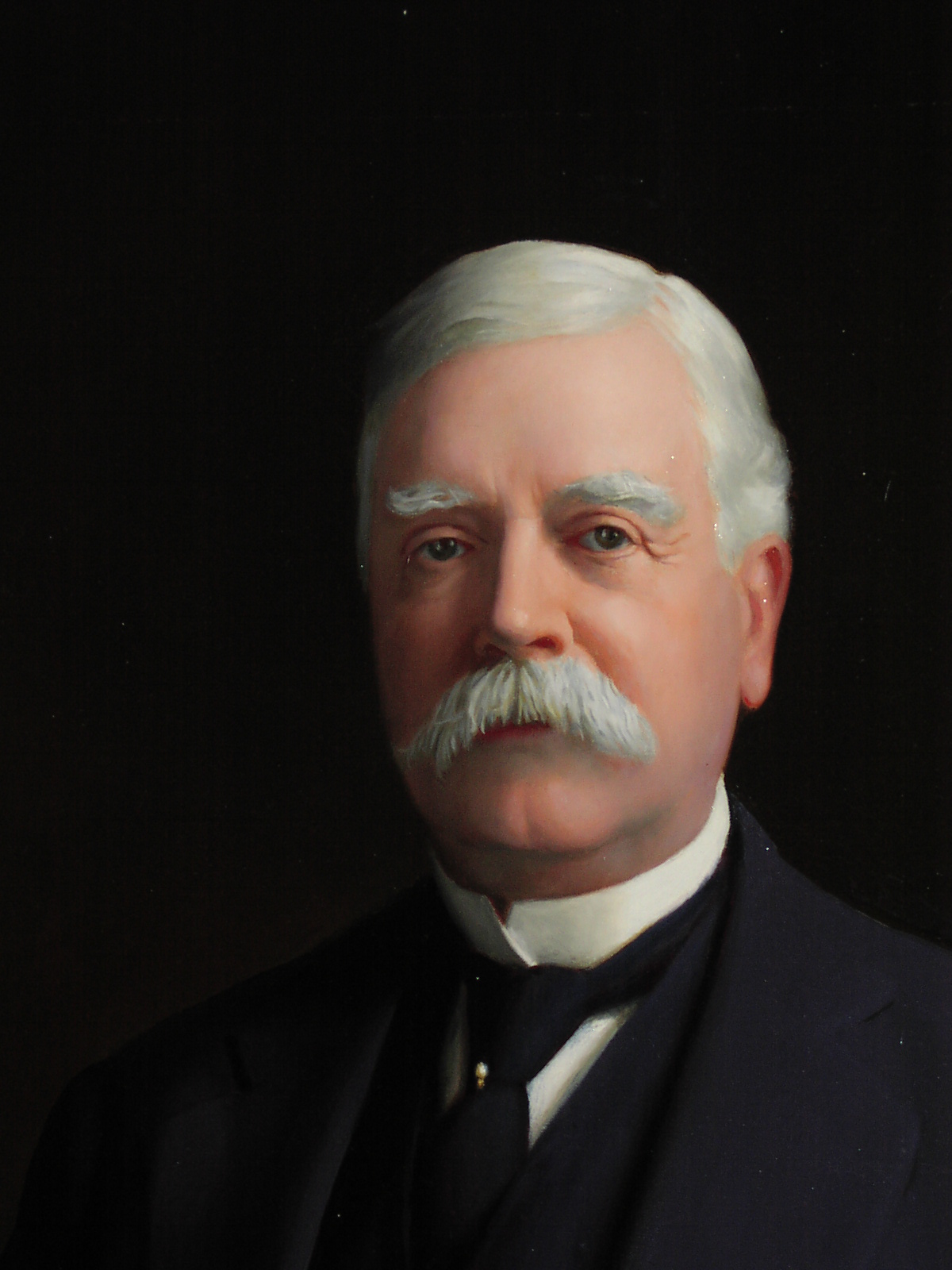
Frank P. Carpenter, founder & benefactor of the Carpenter Memorial Building (Manchester City Library)

=== New Hampshire Room ===
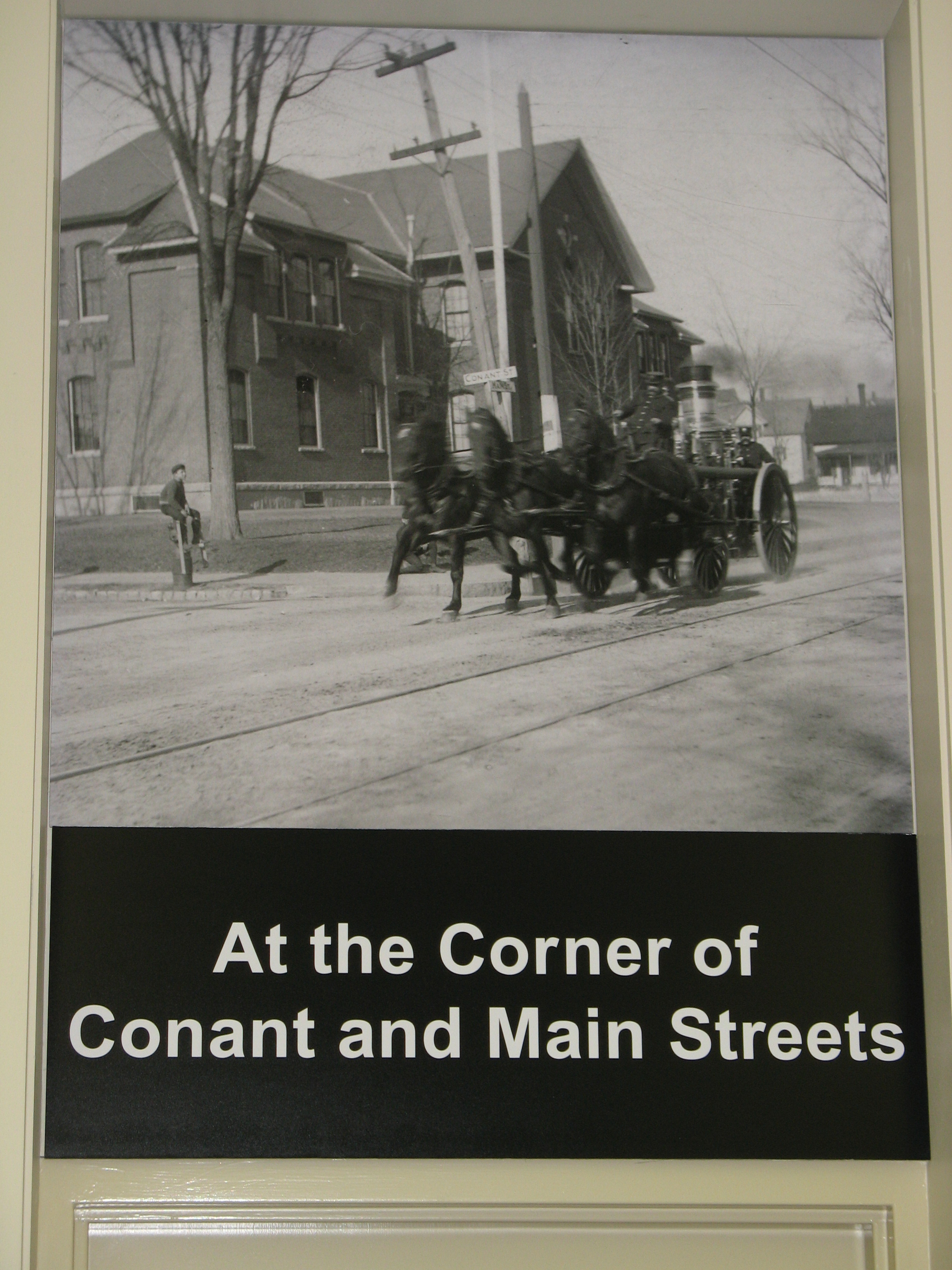
The original King Fire Station in Manchester (now the West Branch of the Manchester City Library)

On March 16, 1958, the New Hampshire (NH) Room was dedicated in the Manchester City Library. The NH Room houses a reference collection containing genealogical information, military and immigration records, biographies, Manchester city directories, literature, yearbooks, vital records, and library scrapbooks, and local town histories. It also includes microfilm of federal census records for New Hampshire, as well as popular local and regional newspapers dating back to the mid-1800s. In 1995, upon a bequest from a late Carpenter family relative, Priscilla Sullivan, the NH Room was moved to the largest second-floor room in the building.

=== Staff, trustees, and volunteers ===
Frank P. Carpenter, in addition to paving the way for the existing of the current building, also served as a library trustee from 1892 to 1937. His children, Mary Carpenter Manning and Aretas Blood Carpenter, also were library trustees, serving from 1927 to 1965 and 1940 to 1965 respectively.

The original Board of Trustees in 1854 included: Frederick Smyth (Mayor, Ex-Officio), David J. Clarke (President, Common Council), Samuel D. Bell, Daniel Clark, David Gillis, William P. Newell, E.A. Straw, William C. Clarke, Samuel N. Bell Since its inception, the library has had fifteen directors, including Denise M. van Zanten, who is the current director.

== West Branch ==
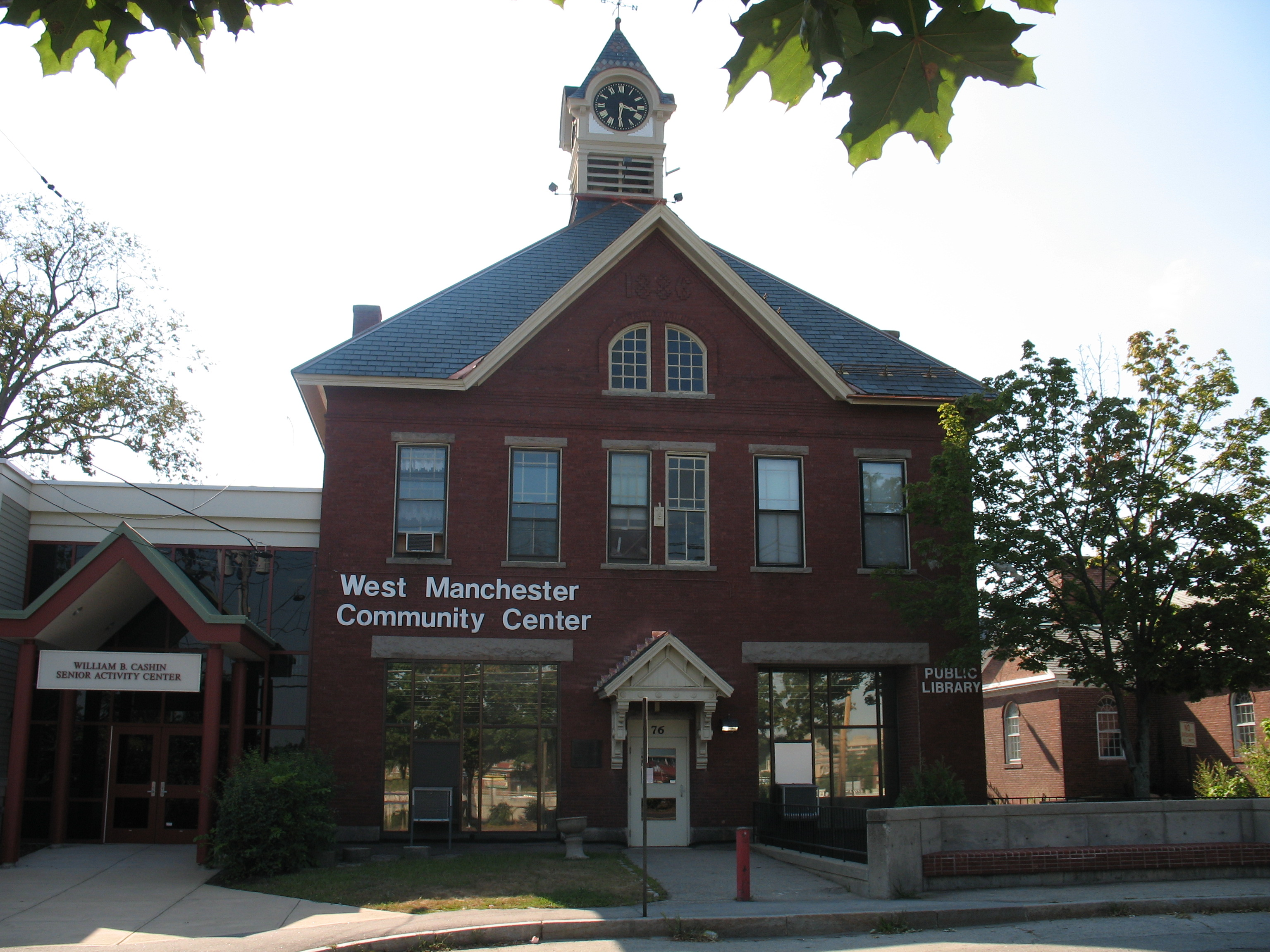
Renovated West Branch of the Manchester City Library

As the community grew, so did the need for an additional branch on the west side of the Merrimack River. In 1978, discussions for a new community center led the original King Fire Station at 76 North Main Street to be transformed into a 15,000-square-foot (1,400 m^{2}) building which houses the William B. Cashin Senior Activity Center and the West Branch of the library. The branch, which is located next to Manchester High School West, opened in 1980, and then closed in 2015 due to a major flood. It then reopened in 2016 after a massive renovation of the three-story building.

== Renovations and enhancements ==
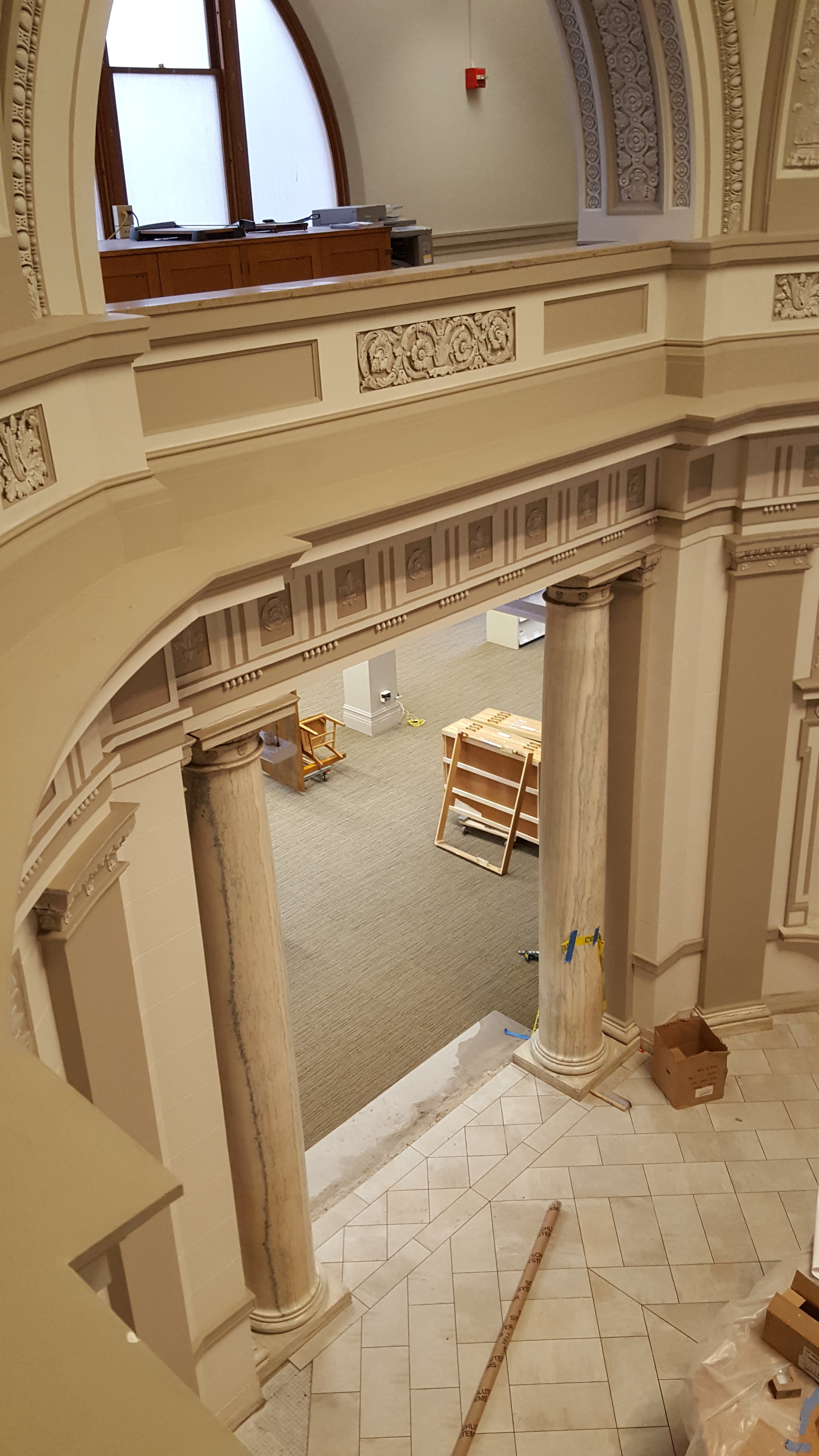
Flooring remodel, Jan. 2017

Over the years, the library has undergone several renovations to enhance and preserve the integrity of the currently existing buildings:

- 1937: Bronze railing installed on the front steps as a gift from Frank P. Carpenter
- 1973: Fire alarm system installed
- 1979: Construction begins on the West Branch
- 1984: Handicapped Accessible Ramp installed at main building
- 1986: Main floor closet made into a public restroom
- 1991: A new elevator was installed to replace the original. The Manchester Garden Club raised funds to add greenery and landscaping to the grounds.
- 1997: The West Branch gets a face lift; the Clock Tower is restored
- 2000: New, custom-built Circulation Desk is installed
- 2005-2006: Fire alarm system upgraded; a climate control system with air conditioning was installed; significant cleaning of the building; restoration of the tile roof, installation of a built-in gutter system and site lighting.
- 2006: More renovations at branch in Circulation and Children's services; branch extends usage to all three floors of building; major flooding in lower level of main building leads to new tile flooring in bathrooms and Winchell Room
- 2007-2008: Fiber-optic lines were installed at the West Branch to enhance computer connections. During this time, repairs were made to the leaking roof and chimney.
- 2013: The main floor bathroom was refinished.
- 2015-2016: A frozen pipe burst on February 17, 2015, in the lower level of the West Branch, filling it with 5 feet (1.5 m) of water. After a year's worth of renovations, the branch re-opened to the public in May 2016 after a significant remodel. Renovations totaled close to a half a million dollars' worth in materials, shelves and furnishings, elevator, walls, doors, a heating/cooling system, and windows.
- 2017: The main library closed to the public between January 16 and 29, 2017, for a floor renovation project. New carpets were installed throughout a majority of the building, and marble tiles in the Rotunda matching the overall color scheme were laid down. During this time, extended hours were in place at the West Branch.
- 2019: The children's room on the lower level underwent renovations.
- 2024: A pipe in a second floor bathroom burst, causing the majority of the non-fiction section to be closed off while repairs were made.
- 2026: The library underwent lead abatement on the main floor.

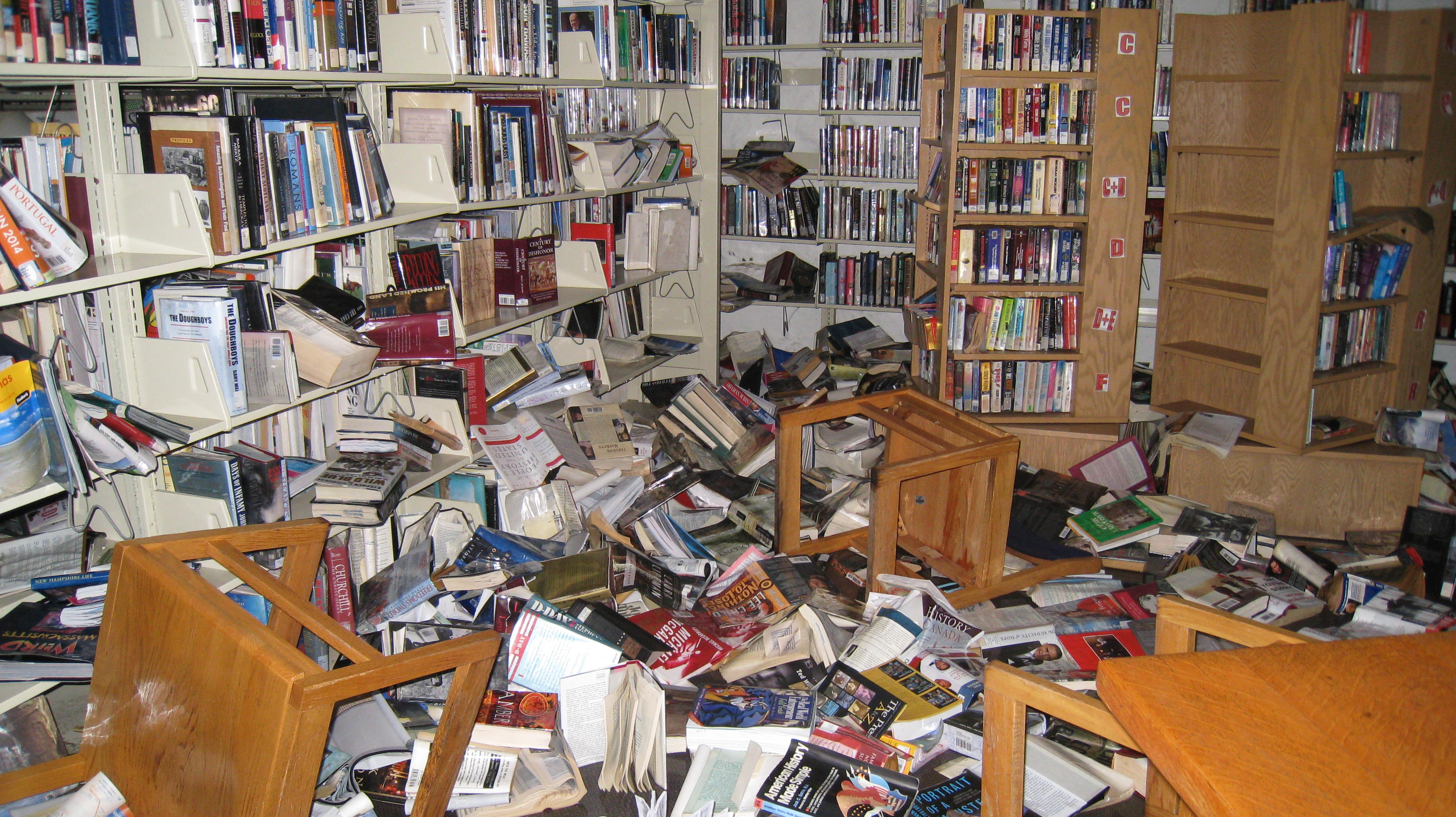
2015 - Flood damage to the West Branch of the Manchester City Library occurred due to a frozen pipe bursting.

== Other facts ==
- Some of the original oak tables are still being used by the public in the building today.
- A central ventilation and vacuuming system were in use during the library's opening.
- The entryway and lower level hallway are made of marble.
- In 1986, the children's room, originally located on the south side of the main floor, was relocated to the lower level.
- The library's auditorium seats 173 individuals, and was initially called the "Lecture Hall".
- When the building first opened, it housed the Manchester Historic Association.
- The desk in the Rotunda is original to the building.
- MCL contains the largest collection of materials in the state of New Hampshire with approximately 225,000 items.
