= New Hampshire Institute of Art =

Former art school in Manchester, New Hampshire

Coordinates: 42°59′30″N 71°27′39″W

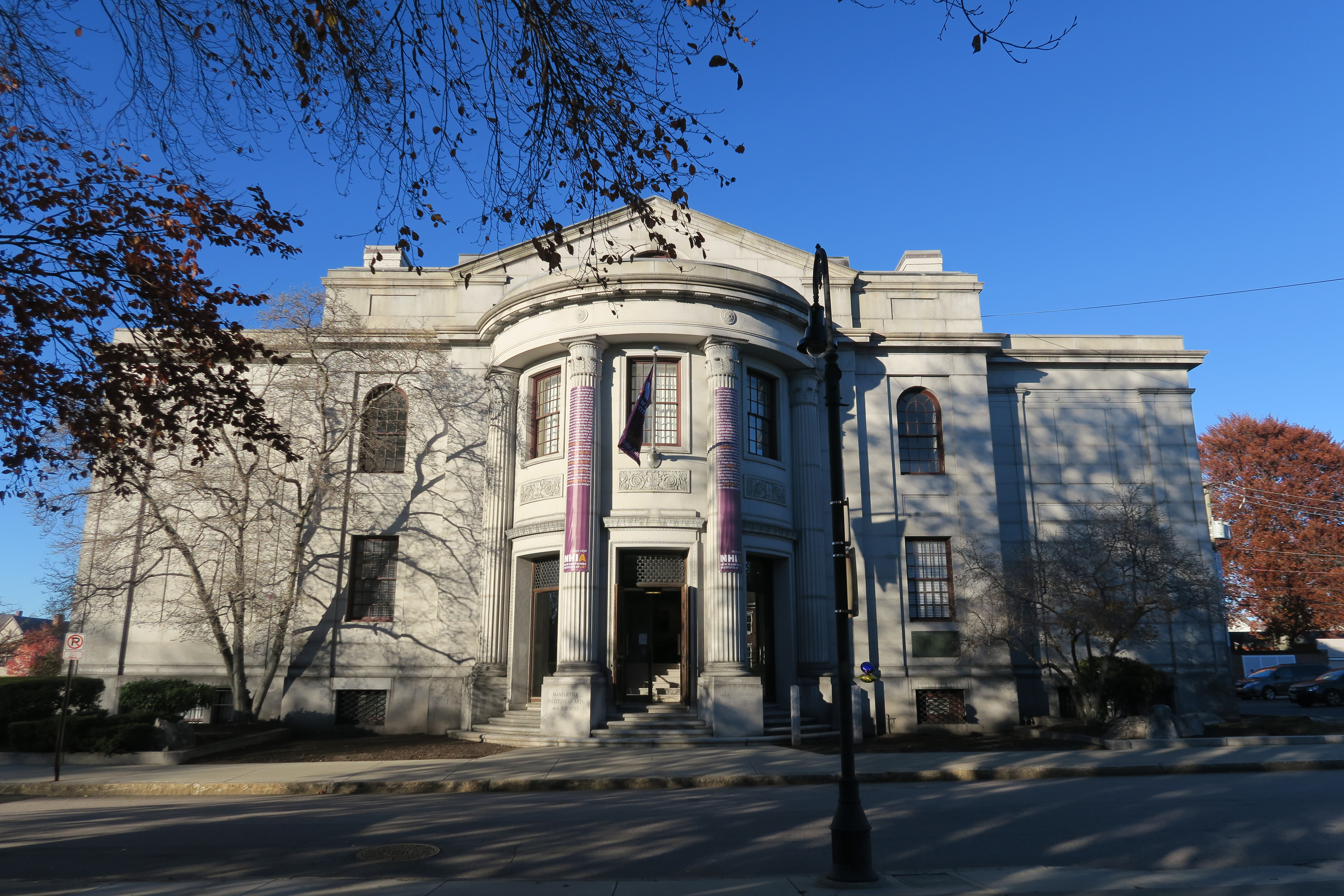
- Type: Private art school
- Established: 1898
- Affiliations: NHCUC
- Location: Manchester, New Hampshire, United States
- Campus: Urban
- Website: iad.nec.edu
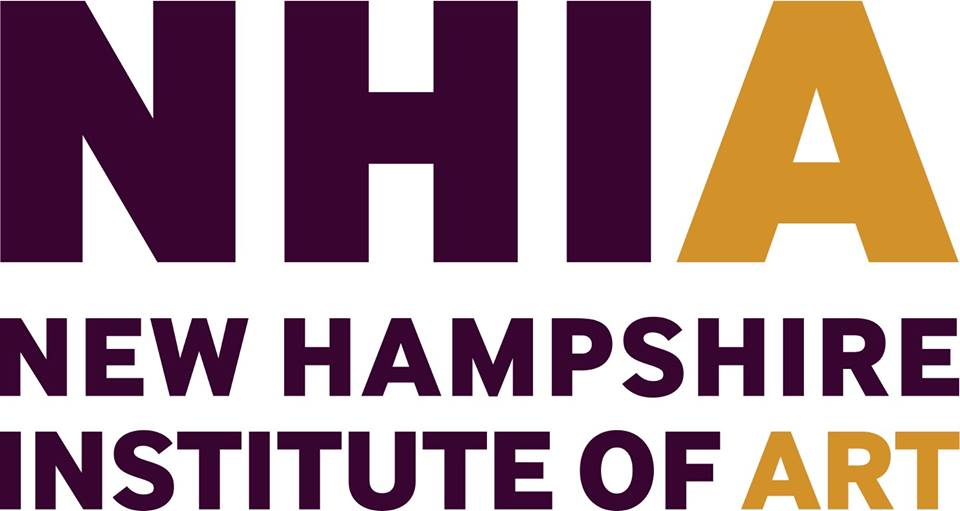

The New Hampshire Institute of Art (NHIA) was a private art school in Manchester, New Hampshire. It was accredited by the National Association of Schools of Art and Design (NASAD) and the New England Association of Schools and Colleges (NEASC) and was a member of the Association of Independent Colleges of Art and Design (AICAD). NHIA offered the Bachelor of Fine Arts as well as Master of Fine Arts and Master of Arts in Teaching.

In 2019, the institute merged with New England College and became the college's Manchester campus. New England College closed the campus in 2023.

== History ==
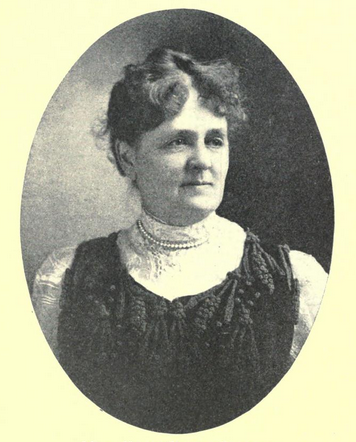
Emma Blood French

NHIA was founded in 1898 as the Manchester Institute of Arts and Sciences with the goal of promoting a "cultivation of the arts and sciences, to give a more general impulse and systematic direction to scientific research and encourage and stimulate the study of history, literature, and industrial institutions." In 1916 the institute moved into a new permanent home with the construction of French Hall, named in honor of the institute's patron, Mrs. Emma Blood French. In 1924, the New Hampshire State Board of Education certified the institute's four-year program to prepare high school graduates to teach art. Shortly thereafter, a four-year program in fine arts was approved.

In 1997, the state of New Hampshire authorized the institute to award the Bachelor of Fine Arts degree. It was at this time that the school adopted a new name: the New Hampshire Institute of Art. The college received accreditation from the National Association of Schools of Art and Design (NASAD) in 2001 and from the New England Association of Schools and Colleges (NEASC) in 2011.

In the late 1990s, the college was the beneficiary of a $24 million bequest from the estate of Mary Fuller Russell. This allowed NHIA to establish an endowment and embark upon a major expansion of its campus. From 2002 to 2012, under the leadership of then president Roger Williams, the college's enrollment and physical plant expanded rapidly to encompass over 500 students.

In 2007 the college received a significant gift of over 2,000 rare photographic books from the collector and philanthropist John Teti. Among the highlights of the collection is a complete set of Alfred Stieglitz’s Camera Work dating from 1903 to 1917 as well as publications and photographs extending as far back as 1864. NHIA subsequently renamed its library the Teti Library in honor of the donor.

In 2012, the closure of Chester College of New England, a small liberal arts college based in Chester, New Hampshire, resulted in over 80 percent of the student body and several full-time faculty members transferring to NHIA.

That same year NHIA reached agreement with the Sharon Arts Center, a small community-based arts education center with operations in Sharon and Peterborough, New Hampshire, to merge operations. The Sharon Arts Center was incorporated on October 22, 1946, its stated purpose being "To stimulate, encourage and provide education in the theory and practice of the arts and crafts through instruction, exhibitions and marketing assistance."

The merger with the Sharon Arts Center coincided with NHIA introducing a new, low-residency M.F.A. program based in Sharon and Peterborough in 2013.

In 2016, NHIA announced a new academic partnership with the University of New Hampshire at Manchester that allows students at either college to enroll in classes at the partner institution at no additional cost. In the summer of 2017 NHIA announced new programs in Comic Arts, Printmaking, and User Experience (UX) Design.

In 2017, NHIA announced a new Certificate in Creative Placemaking program in partnership with the National Consortium for Creative Placemaking (NCCP).

In 2019, NHIA announced that they had completed a merger with New England College.

In 2023, New England College closed the Manchester campus and moved all remaining students to the main campus in Henniker.

== Campus ==
The New Hampshire Institute of Art campus was within the Manchester Cultural District, a six-block area encompassing the Victory Park Historic District that includes several local arts and cultural institutions as well as five historic buildings designed by noted architects William Rantoul and Edward Tilton.

NHIA owned or leased a total of eleven buildings in Manchester, Sharon, and Peterborough, New Hampshire. Notable among these:

- French Hall (148 Concord Street, Manchester), named in honor of NHIA's patron, Mrs. Emma Blood French, erected in 1916 and housing the Admissions, Financial Aid, Printmaking, and Fine Arts departments as well as a 325-seat auditorium.
- Fuller Hall (156 Hanover Street, Manchester). The former New Hampshire Fire Insurance Company building was renovated to house NHIA's Photography department and Teti Library and Special Collections in 2000. It was renamed Fuller Hall in recognition of Mary Fuller Russell.
- Williams Hall and Gallery (77 Amherst Street, Manchester). Purchased in March 2005, the former Stan's Masury paint store was renovated and reopened in January 2006. The building is now home to the Ceramics and Foundations departments as well as a student lounge, faculty offices, senior studios, and Williams Gallery dedicated in honor of former president Roger Williams in 2014.
- Lowell Hall (88 Lowell Street, Manchester). In 2009, NHIA embarked on a project to combine the existing building at 88 Lowell Street with a newly constructed, six-story residence hall. This entailed moving the historic structure that had been home to Manchester's first public high school closer to the street and earned the project architect Dennis Mires, P.A. an American Institute of Architects New Hampshire Excellence in Architecture Design Award.
- Sharon Arts Center (457 Route 123, Sharon). Ground was broken for the school and administration building in Sharon in the spring of 2000. The building was completed in November and dedicated in December. New classes were started in January 2001.

== Academics ==
NHIA offered accredited degree programs through its undergraduate and graduate divisions, as well as a combined B.F.A./M.A.T. Dual degree. It also offered Community Education (CE) professional development and programs for high school teens.

== Notable faculty ==
- Lucinda Bliss
- Gary Samson
- Craig Stockwell

== Notable alumni ==
- Jennifer Anne Gordon, author
- Andrea Joyce Heimer, painter
- Kyle Mosher, artist
- Tyler Devlin, make-up artist and drag queen better known as Laila McQueen
