= Craig Stockwell =

American artist

Craig Stockwell (b. Cambridge, Massachusetts, 1952) is a visual artist who paints large, colorful, abstract paintings. He served (2013-20) as the Director of the MFA in Visual Arts program at the New Hampshire Institute of Art.

== Early life ==
Originally from Massachusetts, Stockwell began his studies at Dartmouth College and then earned a Bachelor of Fine Arts (B.F.A.) in Art from the Rhode Island School of Design (RISD) in 1975. At RISD Stockwell studied with noted glass artist Dale Chihuly and later went on to work in glass in Minneapolis, in Boulder, Colorado, and in Boston. Stockwell relocated and lived in New York City for many years, before moving to Spain in 1986 and then Keene, New Hampshire, in 1988 where he currently resides with his wife.

Stockwell earned a Master of Education (M.Ed.) degree from Antioch University (1991) and his Master of Fine Arts (M.F.A.) degree in Art from the Vermont College of Fine Arts (2000).

== Career ==
In the 1980s Stockwell's conceptually based sculptural installations were exhibited widely in New York including at PS1 (Museum of Modern Art) and in "Sculpture at the Coliseum" a group show of eight sculptors that also included Louise Bourgeois, Mark di Suvero, Jackie Ferrara, Alan Saret, and others. Stockwell's work has been reviewed in The New York Times, The Village Voice, Newsday, The Soho News, and the Boston Globe. He has been interviewed and profiled in publications such as Hyperallergic. He has also written criticism for Brooklyn Rail, Art New England, and other publications.

Stockwell's drawings and paintings have been included in solo exhibitions at the Nielsen Gallery in Boston, the Boston Center for the Arts, Marlboro College, New England College, the Fitchburg Museum, the Southern Vermont Arts Center in Manchester, Vermont, and McGowan Fine Art in Concord, New Hampshire. His work is in the collections of Fidelity Investments, Wellington Management, Alliance Capital, and the Museum of Fine Arts, Boston, where he participated in the 2003 exhibition “Visions and Revisions: Works on Paper 1960 to the Present,” curated by Clifford Ackley. He was awarded a New Hampshire Independent Artists Grant in 2001 and a Sharpe-Walentas Fellowship in 2013.

In 2016 Stockwell was one of only 12 artists invited to participate in the DeCordova Museum and Sculpture Park's deCordova 2016 New England Biennial.

Stockwell teaches at MassArt (MFA) and Lesley University (MFA). He has taught at Keene State College, Marlboro College, Union Institute and University, and Vermont College of Fine Arts. He was represented by Genovese/Sullivan in Boston. In 2022 he initiated and directed the Social Practice Artist's Residency (Keene, NH). The pilot program featured artist Roz Crews for the month of October. The work produced was, "when no one is there to witness how it feels."
