= Lucien Hippolyte Gosselin =

American sculptor

Lucien Hippolyte Gosselin (January 2, 1883 - March 25, 1940) was an American sculptor active in New England.

Gosselin was born in Whitefield, New Hampshire, the son of French-speaking immigrants Fidèle Gosselin and Lucrèce Hébert, sister of noted Quebecois sculptor Louis-Philippe Hébert. When he was 2, the family moved to Manchester, New Hampshire. After school graduation, he joined his brothers in a barbershop, but as he had shown an aptitude for art, he began training in the studio of a Manchester artist, Emile Maupas. In 1911, with the encouragement of Maupas and Bishop Guertin, Gosselin enrolled in the Académie Julian in Paris, where he studied for five years. In his first two years, he was awarded the Prix Julian. He exhibited in the Paris Salon of 1913 and 1914, winning an Honorable Mention in 1913. Gosselin returned to Manchester in 1916, where from 1920 until his death, he taught sculpture at the Manchester Institute of Arts and Sciences.

== Selected works ==
Seal of the former Société Historique Franco-Américaine (Franco-American Historical Society), designed by Gosselin

- Sacred Heart Monument (1920), Notre Dame de Lourdes Church, Fall River, Massachusetts
- World War I Memorial (1928), Manchester, New Hampshire
- Judge Alfred J. Chretien bust, c.1930, in the Currier Museum of Art
- Sweeney Memorial (1931), Manchester, New Hampshire
- Pulaski Memorial (1938), Manchester, New Hampshire
- Dubois Memorial, Laconia, New Hampshire
- Gatineau Memorial, Southbridge, Massachusetts
- Monsignor Millette Memorial, Nashua, New Hampshire
- Father Boissoneault Memorial, Saint Johnsbury, Vermont
