= Joe Bergman =

American basketball player

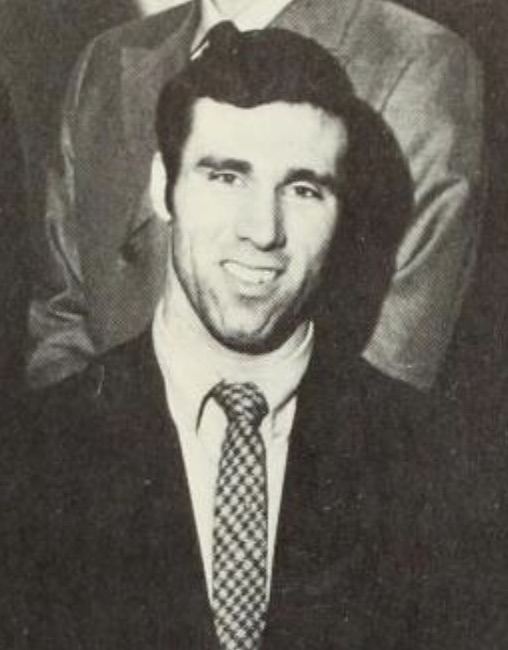
- Bergman in 1970

Personal information
- Born: c. 1947 (age 78–79) Clinton, Iowa, U.S.
- Listed height: 6 ft 9 in (2.06 m)
- Listed weight: 210 lb (95 kg)

Career information
- High school: St. Mary's (Clinton, Iowa)
- College: Iowa (1967–1968); Creighton (1968–1971)
- NBA draft: 1971: 2nd round, 31st overall pick
- Drafted by: Cincinnati Royals
- Position: Power forward

Career highlights
- First-team Parade All-American (1966)
- Stats at Basketball Reference

Joseph Bergman (born c. 1947) is an American former basketball player and psychiatrist. He was a highly recruited prospect while playing at St. Mary's High School in his hometown of Clinton, Iowa, and is considered one of Iowa's best high school basketball players. Bergman played college basketball for the Iowa Hawkeyes and the Creighton Bluejays. He was drafted by the Cincinnati Royals of the National Basketball Association (NBA) but elected to pursue a career in psychiatry over playing professional basketball. Bergman worked at Cheshire Medical Center in Keene, New Hampshire, for 24 years until his retirement in 2015.

== Early life ==
Bergman was born and raised in Clinton, Iowa. His father was an aluminium plant worker and his mother was a homemaker. Bergman is of German descent through his paternal grandfather.

While attending elementary school, Bergman was convinced by his school coach, Gene McDonald, to begin playing basketball due to his height. McDonald continued to mentor Bergman as a player when he attended St. Mary's High School in his hometown of Clinton and played on the basketball team there. Basketball became the foremost part of Bergman's life and he practiced rebounding, free throw shooting and ball handing extensively.

Bergman was a three-time all-state selection and named a first-team Parade All-American during his senior season. Bergman received 150 athletic scholarship offers from teams including the North Carolina Tar Heels, Kentucky Wildcats and the UCLA Bruins but he decided to stay in his home state and play for the Iowa Hawkeyes.

== College career ==
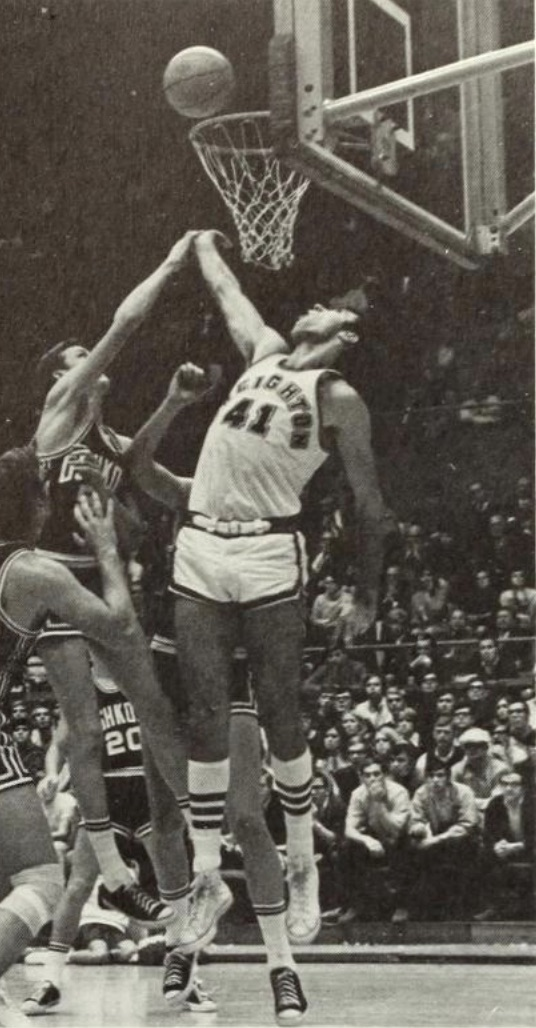
Bergman with the Creighton Bluejays in 1970

Bergman sat out his freshman season with the Hawkeyes in 1966–67. While at the University of Iowa, he developed an interest in psychology and childhood development and volunteered at a university program for children with disabilities. On the court, Bergman struggled during his sophomore season and failed to find a consistent role with the team, while he considered head coach Ralph Miller "terrible". He elected to transfer to the Creighton Bluejays after only having played 12 games with the Hawkeyes.

Bergman began playing for the Bluejays during the 1968–69 season, but again had a troubled start and did not find himself a valued contributor until the 1969–70 season when he averaged 10.5 points and 7 rebounds per game. At the conclusion of the season, he was selected by the San Francisco Warriors in the seventh round of the 1970 NBA draft and the Kentucky Colonels in the 1970 ABA draft. However, Bergman still had a semester left of eligibility and elected to return to the Bluejays in an attempt to earn a higher draft selection for the 1971 NBA draft. After the first semester finished, Bergman stayed at Creighton University and began graduate work in psychology. Bluejays head coach Eddie Sutton believed that Bergman would have great potential as a professional player due to his shooting and defensive abilities, calling him the "finest defensive player" and "the most energetic hustler". Bergman graduated in 1971 with a bachelor's degree in political science and a minor in psychology.

== Professional basketball career ==
Bergman was selected in the 1971 NBA draft as the 31st overall pick by the Cincinnati Royals. He played in the 1971 preseason with the Royals, but felt like he was used out of position at center instead of his natural power forward by head coach Bob Cousy. Bergman was the final Royals player cut before the start of the 1971–72 NBA season. He ultimately never played in the National Basketball Association (NBA) as he decided to retire and return to school to continue studying psychology.

== Psychiatry career ==
Bergman enrolled at Xavier University and pursued a master's in psychology. While in graduate school, he found a job at Longview State Hospital in Cincinnati, Ohio. His stint at the hospital, where he worked with criminally insane patients, influenced a change in educational goals; he decided to attend medical school to become a psychiatrist and be able to prescribe medications.

Bergman left Xavier without finishing his master's program. He applied to numerous medical schools and was accepted by the Universidad Autónoma de Guadalajara in Mexico where he became fluent in Spanish as English was not spoken at the school. He received his medical degree in 1980 and found employment at the Johns Hopkins University in Baltimore, Maryland. Bergman worked there for five years alongside colleagues including Fred Berlin and John Money. He then worked at Taylor Manor in nearby Ellicott City, Maryland, but later chose to move to a safer area to raise his son. In 1991, Bergman moved to Keene, New Hampshire, and was appointed medical director of the mental health unit at the Cheshire Medical Center. He worked there for 24 years until his retirement in 2015.
