= GraniteOne Health =

American hospital network

GraniteOne Health is an American hospital network in the state of New Hampshire. It was formed in 2016 by Catholic Medical Center in Manchester, Huggins Hospital in Wolfeboro, and Monadnock Community Hospital in Peterborough.

In 2019, Dartmouth–Hitchcock Medical Center announced that it was planning to merge with GraniteOne. In May 2022, the deal was called off after the office of the New Hampshire Attorney General said it would violate the New Hampshire constitution.
