= Sacred Heart Hospital (Manchester, New Hampshire) =

Geography
- Location: 177 Amherst St, Manchester, New Hampshire, United States
- Coordinates: 42.991807°N 71.457872°W

History
- Opened: 1892
- Closed: 1974

Links
- Lists: Hospitals in New Hampshire

Sacred Heart Hospital was a Catholic hospital in Manchester, New Hampshire. It was founded in 1892 by Mother Mary Gonzaga, a Catholic Sister of Mercy from Dublin, Ireland, and originally located at 177 Amherst Street. The original building was built in 1890 and a much larger addition was added in 1900. In 1974, the hospital merged with the Catholic Medical Center on the West Side of Manchester and was renamed to Catholic Medical Center East. CMC constructed a new building in 1978 on the West Side to pool resources together, leading to the closing of CMC East in 1979. The building is currently used as the headquarters for the Manchester Housing and Redevelopment Authority (MHRA), as well as for public housing, and is now addressed as 198 Hanover St.
