= Harriet McEwen Kimball =

American poet

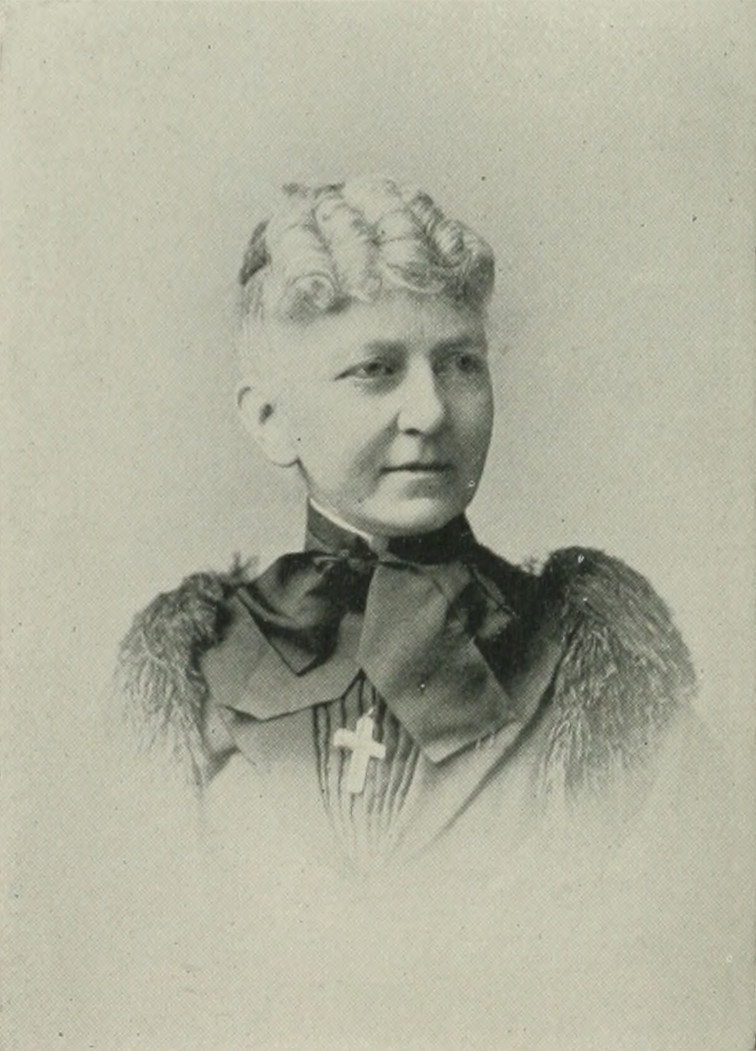
- Portrait photo from A Woman of the Century
- Born: November 2, 1834; Portsmouth, New Hampshire, U.S.
- Died: September 3, 1917 (aged 82); Portsmouth
- Resting place: Harmony Grove Cemetery, Portsmouth
- Occupations: poet, hymnwriter, philanthropist, hospital co-founder

Harriet McEwen Kimball (November 2, 1834 – September 3, 1917) was an American poet, hymnwriter, philanthropist, and hospital co-founder. “The Poetess of the Church” as she was long called, Kimball's life was largely devoted to literature and to church work. She was one of that group of 19th-century poets of which Henry Wadsworth Longfellow was most prominent and which ministered so greatly to the American love of poetry and appreciation of it that the members of the group were in some sense literary pioneers. Kimball was the last of the group to survive.

== Early life and education ==
Harriet McEwen Kimball was born in Portsmouth, New Hampshire, on November 2, 1834. She was a daughter of Dr. David Kimball and Caroline Rebecca Swett. She was a delicate child, and her education was given to her in her own home, mainly by her cultured and accomplished mother. Kimball began to write at an early age, and her work was criticised by her parents, who encouraged her to develop and exercise her poetic gift.

== Career ==
Kimball was interested in charitable work throughout her life, and Portsmouth Cottage Hospital is one of the monuments that attest to her philanthropy. She was an active church member.

In all her literary work, she was careful and painstaking. Her first volume of verse was published in 1867. In 1874, she published her Swallow Flights of Song, and in 1879, The Blessed Company of All Faithful People. In 1889, her poems were brought out in a full and complete edition. Most of her poems were religious in character. Many of them were hymns, and they were included in all church collections of the late 19th-century. Her devotional poems were models of their kind, and her work was considered unique in its rather difficult field. She lived in Portsmouth, devoted to her literary work, and her religious and philanthropic interests.

She was the author of Hymns, (Boston, 1866); Swallow Flights of Song, (1874). Her hymns included:— At times on Tabor's height (Faith arid Joy), Dear Lord, to Thee alone (Lent), It is an easy thing to say. (Humble Service), We have no tears, Thou wilt not dry (Affliction). She appeared in the Poets of Portsmouth (1864), and the Unitarian Hymns of the Spirit (1864), and others. Several of Kimball's poems were included in Robert Hall Baynes' The Illustrated Book of Sacred Poems.

== Personal life ==
She was a friend of John Greenleaf Whittier. She died on September 3, 1917, at her home in Portsmouth, and was buried at Harmony Grove Cemetery, in the same city.

== Selected works ==
- Hymns (1866)
- Swallow Flights of Song (1874)
- The Blessed Company of All Faithful People (1879)
- Poems (1889)

=== Lyrics ===
- At This Thy Banquet, Lord of All
- At Times on Tabor's Height
- Christ Is Risen!
- Dawn of Dawns, the Easter Day
- Day Is Ended, The
- Dear Lord, to Thee Alone
- For Easter Day, O Lilies White
- Glory in the Highest
- It Is an Easy Thing to Say
- I've Heard Them Sing of Earthly Bowers
- Jesus, the Ladder of My Faith
- Sweeter to Jesus When on Earth
- We Have No Tears Thou Wilt Not Dry
- O Sad, Reproachful Face
- Pour Thy Blessings, Lord, Like Showers
- Speechless Sorrow Sat with Me
- There Is but One True Way
- There's Rest on the Bosom of Jesus
- This Is the Feast Time of the Year
- To Him Who Hears I Whisper All
- Wider and Wider Yet
