= Elliot Hospital =

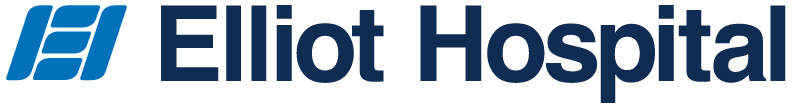

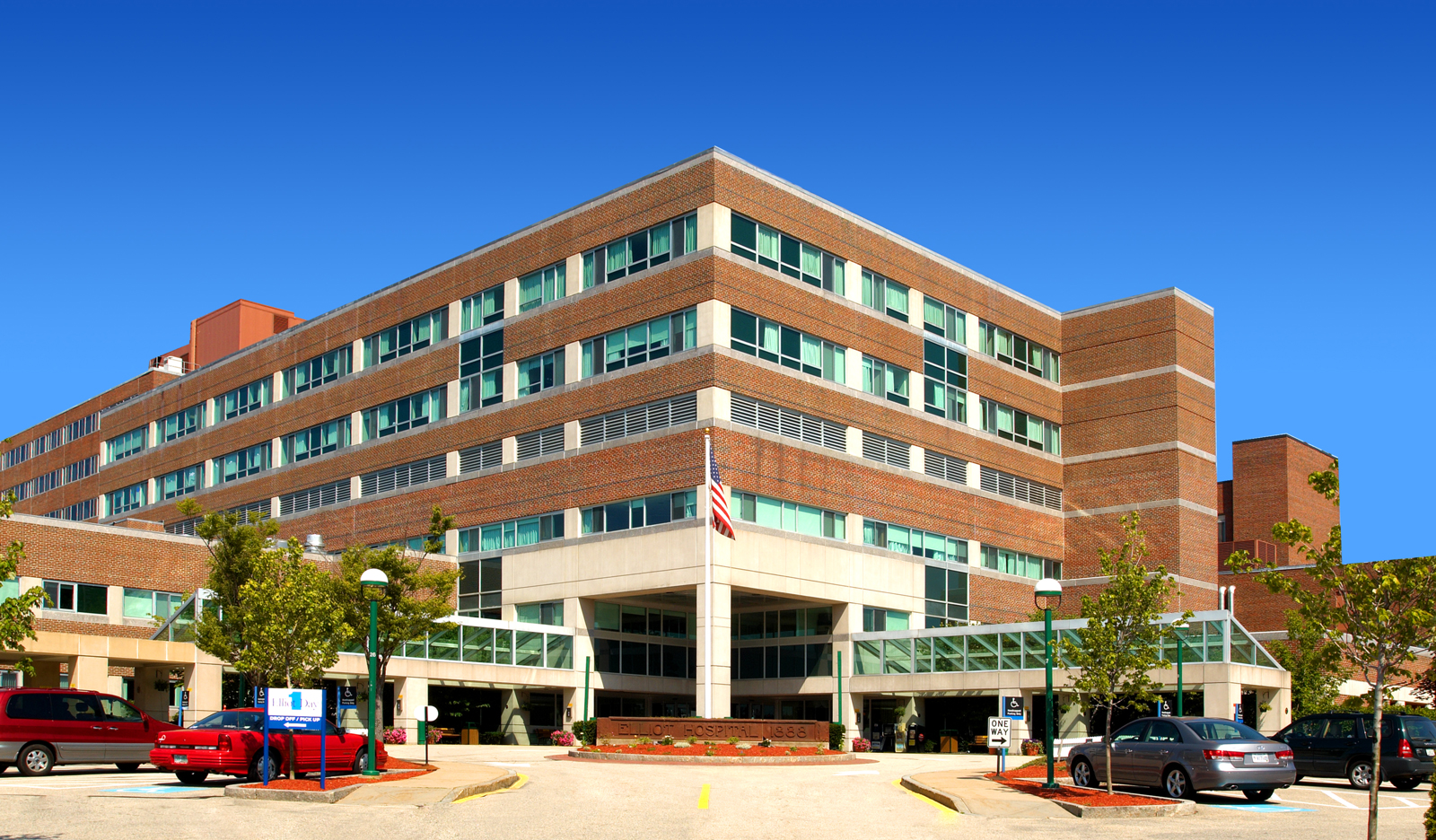

Geography
- Location: One Elliot Way, Manchester, New Hampshire, United States
- Coordinates: 42°59′01″N 71°26′14″W

Organization
- Network: SolutioNHealth

Services
- Emergency department: Level II trauma center
- Beds: 296

Helipads
- Helipad: FAA NH48

History
- Founded: 1881

Links
- Website: http://www.elliothospital.com
- Lists: Hospitals in New Hampshire

Elliot Hospital is an acute care hospital in Manchester, New Hampshire, United States. The Elliot was established as a charitable trust in 1880, was legally incorporated as a not-for-profit organization by an act of the New Hampshire Legislature in 1881, and opened its doors as the first community general hospital in New Hampshire on April 17, 1890. Today the hospital has 296 beds and is a regional trauma center (American College of Surgeons Level II) for the city and the surrounding region. The Elliot has the only Level III neonatal intensive care unit (NICU) in southern New Hampshire.

The Elliot at River's Edge opened in 2010, providing urgent care, an ambulatory surgery center and various clinics and physicians' offices, located on Queen City Avenue in Manchester. Elliot has major ambulatory care centers in Londonderry, Bedford and Hooksett, with numerous offices throughout Manchester and the surrounding communities, including in Goffstown, Hooksett, Bedford, Suncook, Raymond, Amherst and Windham.

Elliot Health System includes the Elliot Medical Group, the Visiting Nurse Association of Manchester and Southern New Hampshire, the Mary and John Elliot Foundation, Elliot 1-Day Surgery Center, the Elliot Regional Cancer Center, and the Elliot Senior Center.

Elliot Health System, which includes Elliot Hospital, is located in northern New England. Manchester is located in southern New Hampshire, 20 miles (32 km) from the Massachusetts border and 58 miles (93 km) from Boston.

In 2018, Elliot joined with Southern New Hampshire Health System based in Nashua, New Hampshire, in a combination relationship, creating a new regional health system known as SolutioNHealth.
