= Alice Peck Day Hospital =

Hospital in New Hampshire

Alice Peck Day Memorial Hospital
- Dartmouth Health

Geography
- Location: Lebanon, New Hampshire, United States
- Coordinates: 43°38′27″N 72°15′50″W

Organization
- Type: Critical access
- Patron: Alice Peck Day

Services
- Emergency department: Yes
- Beds: 24

History
- Founded: 1932

Links
- Website: www.alicepeckday.org
- Lists: Hospitals in New Hampshire

Alice Peck Day Memorial Hospital (APD) is a 24-bed critical access hospital located in Lebanon, New Hampshire, United States. While it started in 1932 as a small cottage hospital, it has since become a larger community hospital that provides standard hospital services such as primary care, women's care, independent living, and assisted living, and more specialized services such as orthopaedics, rehabilitative care, and neurosurgery. It serves roughly 20 communities in Vermont and New Hampshire, and is affiliated with Dartmouth–Hitchcock Medical Center, which is also located in Lebanon.

In 2013, the hospital's president and CEO, Harry G. Dorman, retired after having served for 11 years, during which he brought many changes to the hospital. Upon his retirement, he transferred his positions to the then-current vice president and chief medical officer, Dr. Susan E. Mooney.

APD employs approximately 500 individuals throughout the Upper Valley of Vermont and New Hampshire.
