= Southern New Hampshire Health System =

Coordinates: 42°45′23″N 71°27′45″W

Southern New Hampshire Health

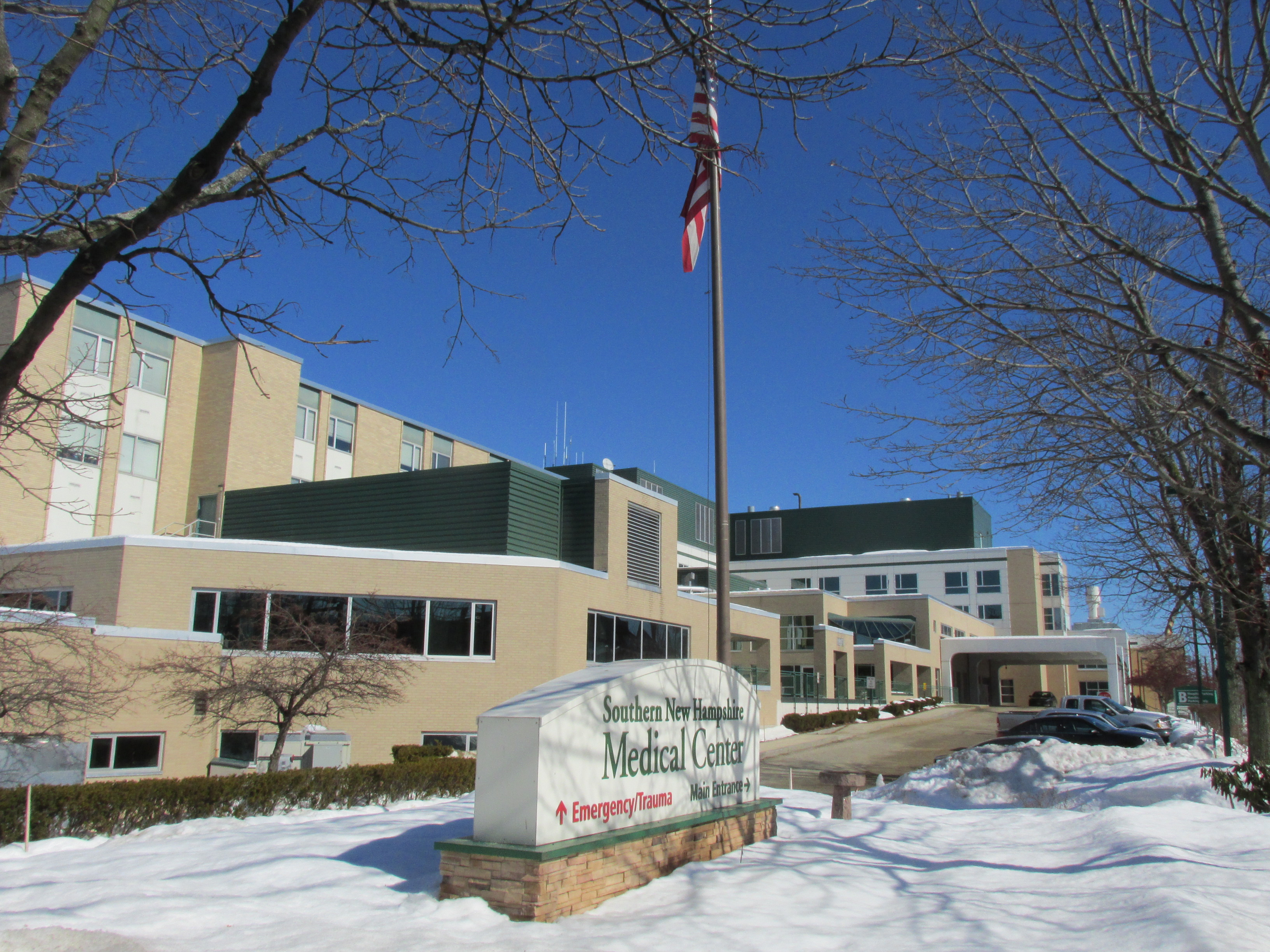
- Southern New Hampshire Medical Center in Nashua, the flagship campus of Southern New Hampshire Health System

Geography
- Location: 8 Prospect St., Nashua, New Hampshire, United States

Organization
- Care system: Private
- Type: Community
- Affiliated university: Dartmouth Medical School

Services
- Emergency department: Level III trauma center
- Beds: 188

Helipads
- Helipad: FAA LID: NH37
Number	Length		Surface
Number	ft	m	Surface
H1	45	14	Rooftop

History
- Founded: 1893

Links
- Website: www.snhhealth.org
- Lists: Hospitals in New Hampshire

Southern New Hampshire Health is a system of hospitals and medical centers throughout the southern part of the state of New Hampshire in the United States. It is anchored by the Southern New Hampshire Medical Center (SNHMC), located in Nashua. The hospital was founded in 1893 as Nashua Memorial Hospital and is now a 188-bed regional medical facility that serves an estimated 100,000 patients a year in the southern New Hampshire region. SNHMC has over 500 primary and specialty care providers. SNHMC offers a full suite of health services, including a trauma center, newborn intensive care unit and distinguished programs in endoscopy, orthopedic surgery, gastroenterology, cardiology and neurosurgery.

== Clinical affiliation with Massachusetts General Hospital ==
Southern New Hampshire Health System is a clinical affiliate of Massachusetts General Hospital (MGH).

== Additional partnerships ==
Foundation Medical Partners (FMP) is an employed medical group of nearly 300 health care providers, under the same parent organization of Southern New Hampshire Health System. In 2018, SNHHS joined with Elliot Health System based in Manchester, New Hampshire, to create a regional health system SolutionHealth.

== History ==
The facility was founded in 1893 as Nashua Memorial Hospital, an eight-bed emergency hospital. For 62 years, the hospital ran the Nashua Memorial Hospital School of Nursing, one of the only sources of professional training in the area for nurses. In 1979, Nashua Memorial Hospital opened the Surgical Short Stay Unit for same-day surgeries, and the hospital continued to expand over the following decades. A $12 million construction project broke ground in July 2004 to expand emergency and cardiology services.
