= Roy S. Herbst =

American oncologist

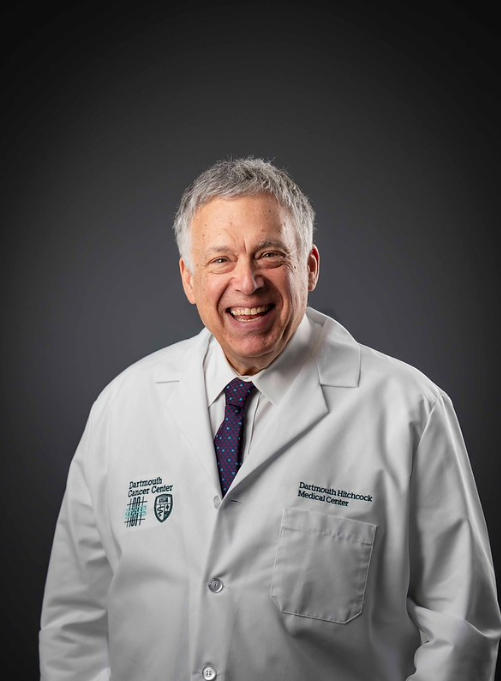
- Born: January 16, 1963 (age 63)
- Known for: Lung cancer research, targeted therapies, BATTLE trial, Lung-MAP, ADAURA trial
- Awards: AACR Distinguished Public Service Award (2020); Giants of Cancer Care Award (2022)
- Scientific career
- Fields: Oncology
- Workplaces: Geisel School of Medicine; Dartmouth Cancer Center; Yale Cancer Center; Yale School of Medicine; MD Anderson Cancer Center

Roy S. Herbst (born January 16, 1963) is an American oncologist who is the current Director of the Dartmouth Cancer Center and Ensign Professor Emeritus of Medicine at the Yale School of Medicine.

He was formerly the Deputy Director of Yale Cancer Center, Chief of Medical Oncology and Associate Director for Translational Research at Yale Cancer Center and Yale School of Medicine in New Haven, Connecticut.

== Education ==
Herbst earned a BS and MS degree from Yale University. He earned his Doctor of Medicine at Cornell University Medical College and his PhD in Molecular Cell Biology at The Rockefeller University in New York City. His clinical fellowships in Medicine and Hematology were completed at the Dana–Farber Cancer Institute and Brigham and Women's Hospital, respectively. He completed a MS degree in Clinical Translational Research at Harvard University in Cambridge, Massachusetts.

== Career ==
Herbst was the Barnhart Distinguished Professor and Chief of the Section of Thoracic Medical Oncology in the Department of Thoracic/Head & Neck Medical Oncology at the University of Texas MD Anderson Cancer Center in Houston, Texas. He also served as Professor in the Department of Cancer Biology and Co-Director of the Phase I Clinical Trials Program at MD Anderson. During his tenure there, he led early-phase clinical development of novel targeted agents for lung cancer, including pivotal studies of therapies targeting the epidermal growth factor receptor (EGFR) and vascular endothelial growth factor receptor (VEGFR) signaling pathways. This work contributed directly to the approval of therapies including gefitinib, erlotinib, cetuximab, bevacizumab, and axitinib.

Herbst also designed and co-led the national Biomarker-integrated Approaches of Targeted Therapy for Lung Cancer Elimination (BATTLE) clinical trial program at MD Anderson, one of the first adaptive biomarker-driven clinical trial designs in oncology. He also served as Co-Director of the Phase I Clinical Trials Program during this period.

Starting in 2011, Herbst has been the Ensign Professor of Medicine, Professor of Pharmacology, Deputy Director, Chief of Medical Oncology, and Associate Director for Translational Research at Yale School of Medicine, Yale Cancer Center, and Smilow Cancer Hospital.

In 2017, Herbst helped establish and led the Yale–AstraZeneca Alliance.

In 2026, Herbst was announced as the 6th director of the Dartmouth Cancer Center.

== Research ==
Herbst's early career focused on the clinical development of novel targeted agents for the treatment of lung cancer, including the early phase development of therapies targeting the epidermal growth factor receptor and vascular endothelial growth factor receptor signaling pathways for the treatment of lung cancer.

Herbst designed and led the national Biomarker-integrated Approaches of Targeted Therapy for Lung cancer Elimination (BATTLE) clinical trial. He served as founding principal investigator of the Lung Master Protocol (Lung-MAP) for ten years and is now Chair Emeritus and Senior Advisor for the trial through SWOG Cancer Research Network. Herbst testified about this work before the U.S. House of Representatives 21st Century Cures Committee and established master protocols as a preferred clinical trial design recognized by the FDA.

Herbst helped design and implement the Pragmatica-Lung Cancer trial (SWOG S2302), a phase III study that used a streamlined pragmatic design to accelerate enrollment and broaden patient participation.

Herbst and his colleagues at Yale did early research on the presence of the immune checkpoint protein PD-L1 in tumors that may dictate response to the immunotherapy atezolizumab. This work earned their team the Herbert Pardes Clinical Research Achievement Award from the Clinical Research Forum, its top award in the US for 2015. Herbst and colleagues at Yale were also among the first to describe the PD-1/PD-L1 adaptive immune response in early-phase clinical trials and to offer clinical trials of the PD-L1 inhibitors atezolizumab and pembrolizumab to lung cancer patients.

Herbst was a senior investigator of the ADAURA trial, a phase III study of adjuvant osimertinib in patients with resected EGFR-mutated non-small cell lung cancer. The trial demonstrated improvements in disease-free and overall survival, leading to worldwide regulatory approvals and adoption of osimertinib as a standard treatment.

Herbst leads a lung cancer-focused National Cancer Institute specialized programs of research excellence (SPORE) grant at Yale, investigating novel immune based therapies, new methods to combat treatment resistance and understanding mechanisms of brain metastasis.

From 2015 to 2019, he served as Yale's representative Principal Investigator of the Stand Up To Cancer-American Cancer Society Lung Cancer Dream Team.

== Professional service ==
Herbst holds memberships in the American Society of Clinical Oncology, the American Association for Cancer Research and the American College of Physicians. He is a Fellow of ASCO and an elected member of the Association of American Physicians. He has served on the Board of Directors of both IASLC and AACR. He was the founding chair of the AACR Tobacco Policy Committee (2010-2022) and since 2023 has been the chair of the AACR scientific policy and government affairs committee. In 2024, he became a member of the Board of Directors for Friends of Cancer Research. In 2025, he was elected into the Connecticut Academy of Science and Engineering.

In 2026, Herbst was elected to National Academy of Medicine.

== Select publications ==
- "Selective oral epidermal growth factor receptor tyrosine kinase inhibitor ZD1839 is generally well-tolerated and has activity in non-small-cell lung cancer and other solid tumors: results of a phase I trial"
- "Gefitinib in combination with paclitaxel and carboplatin in advanced non-small-cell lung cancer: a phase III trial--INTACT 2"
- "Phase I/II trial evaluating the anti-vascular endothelial growth factor monoclonal antibody bevacizumab in combination with the HER-1/epidermal growth factor receptor tyrosine kinase inhibitor erlotinib for patients with recurrent non-small-cell lung cancer"
- "Phase II multicenter study of the epidermal growth factor receptor antibody cetuximab and cisplatin for recurrent and refractory squamous cell carcinoma of the head and neck"
- "Efficacy of bevacizumab plus erlotinib versus erlotinib alone in advanced non-small-cell lung cancer after failure of standard first-line chemotherapy (BeTa): a double-blind, placebo-controlled, phase 3 trial"
- "Osimertinib in Resected EGFR-Mutated Non–Small-Cell Lung Cancer" (ADAURA), New England Journal of Medicine, 2020. doi:10.1056/NEJMoa2027071
- "Overall Survival with Osimertinib in Resected EGFR-Mutated NSCLC" (ADAURA final OS), New England Journal of Medicine, 2023. doi:10.1056/NEJMoa2304594
- "Adjuvant Osimertinib for Resected EGFR-Mutated Stage IB-IIIA Non–Small-Cell Lung Cancer: Updated Results From the Phase III Randomized ADAURA Trial," Journal of Clinical Oncology, 2023.

== Awards ==
- 2010, Waun Ki Hong Award for Excellence in Team Science
- 2016 Paul A. Bunn, Jr. Scientific Award
- 2019, Asclepios Award
- 2020, AACR Distinguished Public Service Award for Exceptional Leadership in Cancer Science Policy
- 2018, Team Science Award, Association for Clinical and Translational Science
- 2021, Friends of Cancer Research 25th Anniversary Scientific and Advocacy Leaders Honoree
- 2022, Giants of Cancer Care Award for Lung Cancer
- 2024, Ezra Greenspan Award, Chemotherapy Foundation
- 2025, Elected to the Connecticut Academy of Science and Engineering
- 2026, Elected to the National Academy of Medicine (NAM)
