= Cheshire Medical Center =

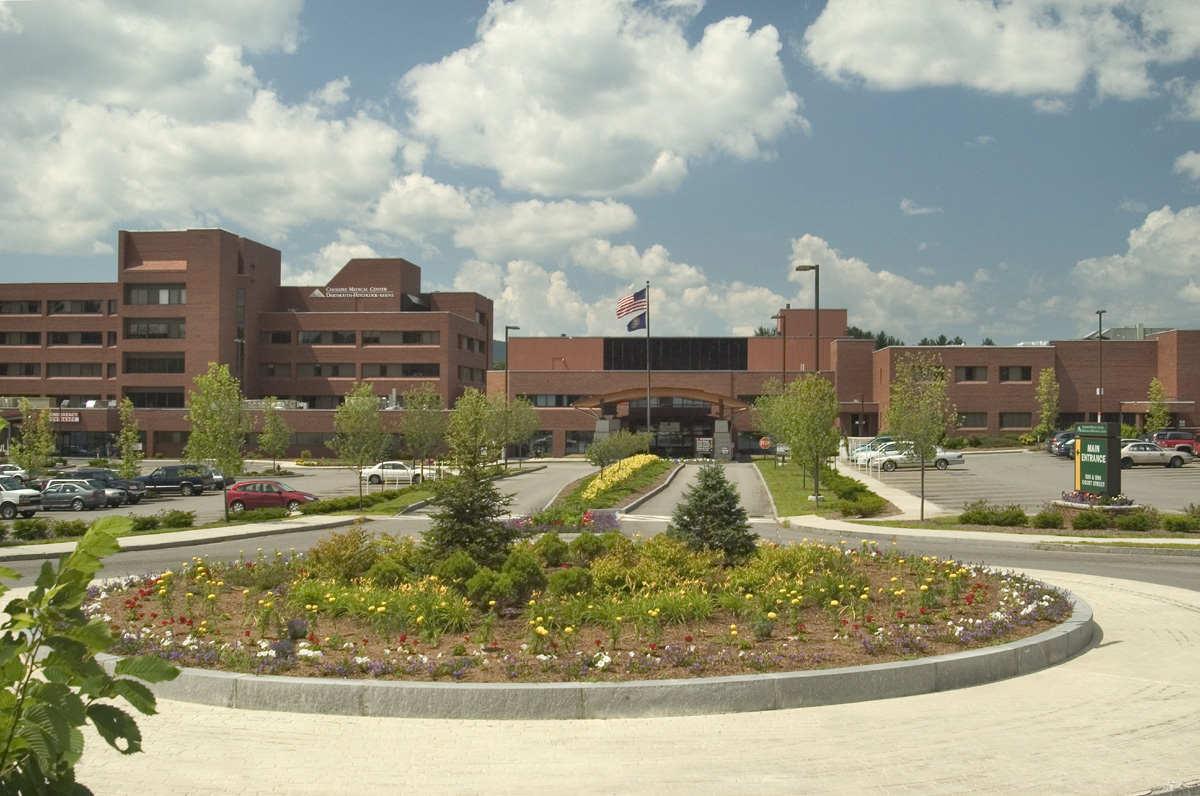
- Cheshire Medical Center

Geography
- Location: Keene, New Hampshire, United States
- Coordinates: 42°56′57″N 72°17′29″W

Organization
- Type: Community
- Network: Dartmouth Health

Services
- Emergency department: Yes
- Beds: 115

Helipads
- Helipad: FAA LID: 14NH
| Number | Length | | Surface |
| Number | ft | m | Surface |
|---|---|---|---|
| H1 | 50 | 15 | Asphalt |

History
- Founded: 1973

Links
- Website: www.cheshiremed.org
- Lists: Hospitals in New Hampshire

Cheshire Medical Center is the only hospital in Cheshire County, New Hampshire, United States. The 115-bed hospital is located in the city of Keene, the Cheshire County seat. It is part of the Dartmouth–Hitchcock health care network.

It was built in 1973 and replaced the Elliot Community Hospital on Main Street which had served as the city's hospital since 1892.

Cheshire Medical Center is listed as one of several rural hospitals at risk of closure due to recent budget cuts under the Trump Administration
