= Catholic Medical Center =

- GraniteOne Health

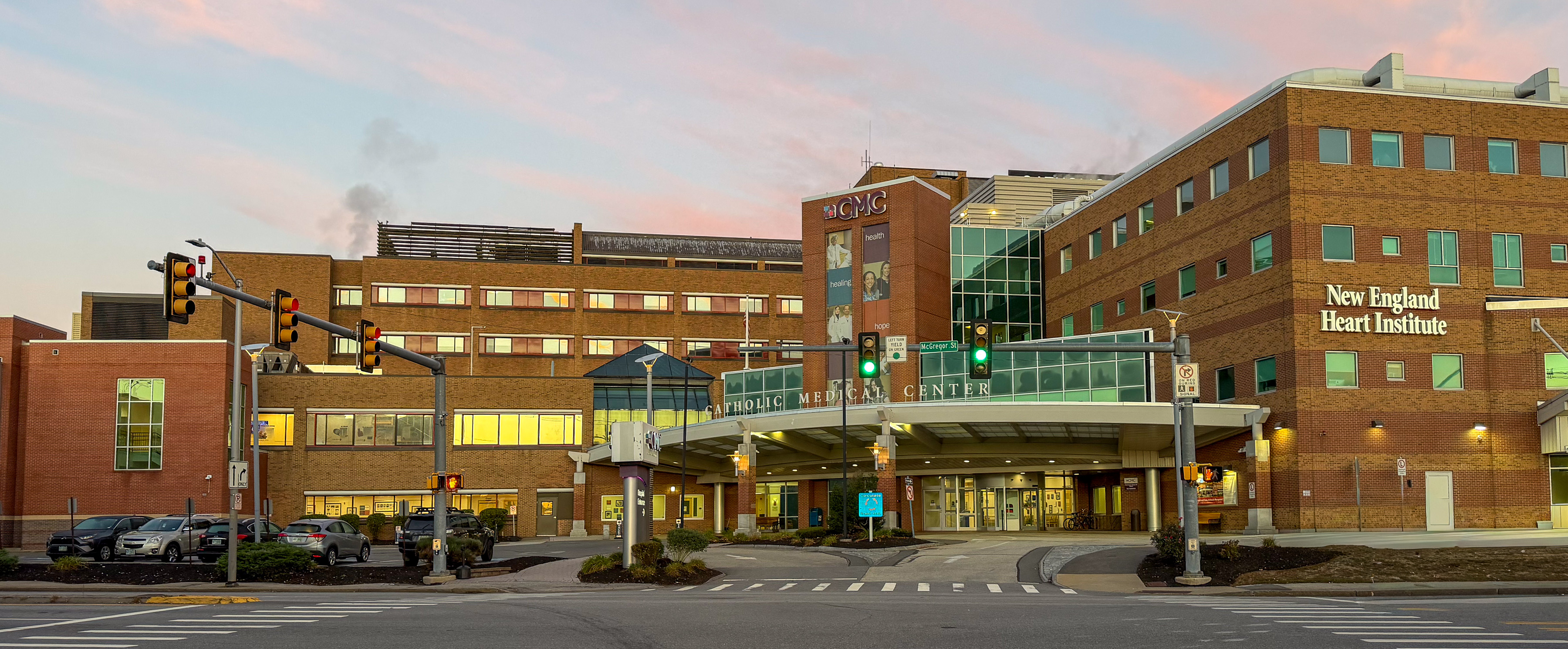
- Catholic Medical Center

Geography
- Location: 100 McGregor Street, Manchester, New Hampshire, United States
- Coordinates: 42°59′29″N 71°28′31″W

Services
- Emergency department: Level III trauma center
- Beds: 330

Helipads
- Helipad: FAA LID: 18NH
Number	Length		Surface
Number	ft	m	Surface
H1	44	13	Asphalt

History
- Founded: 1892

Links
- Website: http://www.catholicmedicalcenter.org
- Lists: Hospitals in New Hampshire

Catholic Medical Center (CMC) is a 330-licensed bed (with 258 beds staffed) not-for-profit full-service acute care hospital located in the West Side area of Manchester, New Hampshire, United States. CMC offers medical-surgical care with more than 26 subspecialties, inpatient and outpatient services, diagnostic imaging and a 30-bed 24-hour emergency department. Norris Cotton Cancer Center at CMC offers medical oncology and infusion services. In September 2022, the hospital was the subject of a highly damaging two-part exposé reported by The Boston Globe's Spotlight investigative journalism team surrounding the alleged coverup of frequent surgical malpractice by a former surgeon.

== History ==
A large hospital in Manchester was first conceived by Mother Mary Gonzaga, one of the original Sisters of Mercy who arrived to the United States in 1858 from Dublin, Ireland. In 1892, she opened Sacred Heart Hospital, located in the center of the city. Two years later, she found a similar vision with Monsignor Peter Hevey, pastor of St. Mary's Parish, and the Sisters of Charity of St. Hyacinthe. They collaborated to open Notre Dame Hospital on the west side of Manchester in 1894, at the site occupied by Catholic Medical Center today.

After decades of providing medical services separately, the two hospitals merged in 1974, forming Catholic Medical Center. With the dedication of a new building in 1978, the hospitals were able to combine resources and medical services, expanding care at the site of the prior Notre Dame Hospital.

Throughout the subsequent decades, CMC continued to grow into one of New Hampshire's largest medical centers, with a dramatic expansion in cardiac care. This resulted in the formation of the New England Heart & Vascular Institute, a nationally recognized leader in advanced cardiovascular services.

In May 2002, CMC opened The Mom's Place maternity center. Approximately 1,200 mothers use The Mom's Place and CMC's Special Care Nursery to deliver their babies each year.

It was announced in January 2025 that CMC will be sold to Tennessee-based HCA Healthcare.

== New England Heart & Vascular Institute ==
Catholic Medical Center is home to the nationally recognized New England Heart and Vascular Institute, which provides a full range of cardiac services and surgical procedures. As one of the largest cardiac hospitals north of Boston, CMC has performed more than 70,000 invasive cardiac procedures, including an average of 400 open heart surgeries each year. The New England Heart Institute is home to the Cholesterol Management Center. NEHI also offers cardiovascular rehabilitation and wellness education to help patients recover in a multi-step program of exercise, education, risk factor management and development of a healthy lifestyle. The New England Heart Institute consists of 32 board certified cardiologists, CT surgeons and mid-level providers who diagnose and treat cardiovascular disease.

== Rankings & recognitions ==
Catholic Medical Center is ranked second in the state of New Hampshire by U.S. News Health behind Dartmouth-Hitchcock Medical Center, and first in Southern New Hampshire. In 2023, it was rated "high performing" in seven procedures and conditions, including four of six rated procedures within cardiology and cardiac surgery.

== Controversies ==
In September 2022, Catholic Medical Center was the subject of a two-part exposé by the Boston Globe investigative journalism team. As reported in the article, a CMC cardiac surgeon had compiled one of the worst surgical malpractice records in the United States; over the past twenty years, no physician in the country had settled more lawsuits involving the surgical death of a patient. The article outlines the extensive efforts of the CMC professional staff to prevent the surgeon from continuing to operate, and the alleged efforts of the CMC administration to suppress dissent and conceal poor outcomes in the interest of allowing the surgeon's profitable activities to continue. This included demoting the hospital's chief medical officer for his “attitude” after he recommended a third-party investigation, threatening the chair of the hospital's peer-review committee with dismissal after he gathered technical information related to one of the surgeon's alleged mistakes, and keeping patients on life support beyond all hope of recovery to protect the surgeon's official mortality statistics. In support of their conclusions, The Globe quoted 17 current or former CMC employees on the record, including 11 physicians.

Earlier that same year, the U.S. Attorney's Office for the District of New Hampshire announced that Catholic Medical Center had agreed to pay $3.8 million "to resolve allegations" that it had participated in an illegal "kickback" scheme. According to the government's assertions, CMC had systematically compensated a local physician for directing patients to CMC for cardiac procedures. The allegations were investigated as the result of a whistle-blower lawsuit filed by a former vice president of the CMC medical staff.

As of September 2022, CMC officials have denied any wrongdoing.
