= List of hospitals in New Hampshire =

Current and former hospitals in New Hampshire

This is a list of hospitals in the U.S. state of New Hampshire, sorted alphabetically by hospital name by default. Hospitals are designated as trauma centers as verified by the American College of Surgeons.

== List ==
List of current and former hospitals in New Hampshire
Name	Network/Parent	City/Town	County	Emergency Department? (Trauma Level)	Opened-Closed	Status / Type / Notes
Alice Peck Day Memorial Hospital	Dartmouth Health	Lebanon	Grafton	Yes	1932–present	Active
Androscoggin Valley Hospital	North Country Healthcare	Berlin	Coös	Yes		Active
Carrie F. Wright Hospital		Newport	Sullivan		1908–1952	Closed
Catholic Medical Center	HCA Healthcare	Manchester	Hillsborough	Yes (Level III)	1892–present	Active
Cheshire Medical Center	Dartmouth Health	Keene	Cheshire	Yes	1973–present	Active
Concord Hospital	Concord Hospital	Concord	Merrimack	Yes (Level II)	1946–present	Active
Concord Hospital - Franklin	Concord Hospital	Franklin	Merrimack	Yes		Active
Concord Hospital - Laconia	Concord Hospital	Laconia	Belknap	Yes		Active
Cottage Hospital	Independent	Woodsville	Grafton	Yes		Active
Dartmouth–Hitchcock Medical Center	Dartmouth Health	Lebanon	Grafton	Yes (Level I)	1893–present	Active - Originally named Mary Hitchcock Memorial Hospital. Renamed in 2009.
Elliot Community Hospital	Independent	Keene	Cheshire		1892–1973	Closed
Elliot Hospital	Solution Health	Manchester	Hillsborough	Yes (Level II)		Active
Encompass Health Rehabilitation Hospital of Concord	Encompass Health	Concord	Merrimack	No		Active
Exeter Hospital	Beth Israel Lahey Health	Exeter	Rockingham	Yes		Active
Frisbie Memorial Hospital	HCA Healthcare	Rochester	Strafford	Yes		Active
Hampstead Hospital	New Hampshire Department of Health & Human Services	Hampstead	Rockingham	No		Active
Huggins Hospital	GraniteOne Health	Wolfeboro	Carroll	Yes		Active
Littleton Regional Hospital	Littleton Regional Healthcare	Littleton	Grafton	Yes		Active
Manchester VA Medical Center	United States Department of Veterans Affairs	Manchester	Hillsborough	No	1950–present	Active
Maplewood Home and Cheshire County Hospital		Westmoreland	Cheshire		c. 1918–1975	Closed
Margaret Pillsbury General Hospital	Independent	Concord	Merrimack		1891–1946	Succeeded - Merged with the Memorial Hospital for Women and Children in 1946, forming Concord Hospital.
Memorial Hospital	MaineHealth	North Conway	Carroll	Yes		Active
Memorial Hospital for Women and Children	Independent	Concord	Merrimack		1896–1946	Succeeded - Merged with the Margaret Pillsbury General Hospital in 1946, forming Concord Hospital
Milford Medical Center	Covenant Health Systems	Milford	Hillsborough	No		Active
Monadnock Community Hospital	Independent	Peterborough	Hillsborough	Yes		Active
New Hampshire Hospital	New Hampshire Department of Health & Human Services	Concord	Hillsborough	No	1842–present	Active
New London Hospital	Dartmouth Health	New London	Merrimack	Yes		Active
Newport Hospital		Newport	Sullivan		1952–1990	Closed
Northeast Rehabilitation Hospital - Manchester	Northeast Rehabilitation Hospital Network	Manchester	Hillsborough	No		Active
Northeast Rehabilitation Hospital - Nashua	Northeast Rehabilitation Hospital Network	Nashua	Hillsborough	No		Active - Located within Southern New Hampshire Medical Center
Northeast Rehabilitation Hospital - Portsmouth	Northeast Rehabilitation Hospital Network	Portsmouth	Rockingham	No		Active
Northeast Rehabilitation Hospital - Salem	Northeast Rehabilitation Hospital Network	Salem	Rockingham	No		Active
Parkland Medical Center	HCA Healthcare	Derry	Rockingham	Yes		Active
Portsmouth Cottage Hospital		Portsmouth	Rockingham			Closed
Portsmouth Regional Hospital	HCA Healthcare	Portsmouth	Rockingham	Yes (Level II)		Active
Sacred Heart Hospital	Catholic Medical Center	Manchester	Hillsborough		1892–1974	Succeeded - Acquired by Catholic Medical Center in 1974.
Saint Joseph Hospital	Covenant Health Systems	Nashua	Hillsborough	Yes	1908–present	Active
Southern New Hampshire Medical Center	Southern New Hampshire Health System	Nashua	Hillsborough	Yes (Level III)	1893–present	Active - Originally named Nashua Memorial Hospital.
Speare Memorial Hospital	Independent	Plymouth	Grafton	Yes		Active
Upper Connecticut Valley Hospital	North Country Healthcare	Colebrook	Coös	Yes		Active
Valley Regional Hospital	Dartmouth Health	Claremont	Sullivan	Yes	1893–present	Active
Weeks Medical Center	North Country Healthcare	Lancaster	Coös	Yes		Active
Wentworth-Douglass Hospital	Mass General Brigham	Dover	Strafford	Yes	1904–present	Active
