= Parkland Medical Center =

- Hospital Corporation of America

Geography
- Location: 1 Parkland Drive, Derry, New Hampshire, United States
- Coordinates: 42°52′36″N 71°19′02″W

Organization
- Affiliated university: None
- Patron: None

Services
- Beds: 86

Helipads
- Helipad: FAA LID: NH54
| Number | Length | | Surface |
| Number | ft | m | Surface |
|---|---|---|---|
| H1 | 40 | 12 | Asphalt |

History
- Founded: 1983

Links
- Website: http://www.parklandmedicalcenter.com/
- Lists: Hospitals in New Hampshire

Parkland Medical Center is an 86-bed hospital in Derry, New Hampshire with an urgent care center in Salem. Parkland was established in 1983 and is part of the Hospital Corporation of America (HCA).
