= Dartmouth Cancer Center =

- Dartmouth–Hitchcock Medical Center; Director: Roy S. Herbst

Geography
- Location: Lebanon, New Hampshire, United States

Organization
- Care system: Public
- Type: Specialist
- Affiliated university: Dartmouth Medical School
- Network: Dartmouth Health

Services
- Standards: NCI-designated Comprehensive Cancer Center
- Speciality: Oncology, teaching hospital

History
- Founded: 1972

Links
- Lists: Hospitals in New Hampshire

Dartmouth Cancer Center (DCC) is a National Cancer Institute-designated Comprehensive Cancer Center, one of 57 in the United States and the highest designation given to cancer hospitals. It is notable for being the only rural cancer center to achieve Comprehensive Cancer Center designation from the National Cancer Institute.

DCC is located at Dartmouth College and the Geisel School of Medicine in Hanover, New Hampshire. Its clinical and administrative offices are located within the Dartmouth-Hitchcock Medical Center in Lebanon, New Hampshire.

Additional DCC locations are in Manchester, Keene, St. Johnsbury and 11 partner hospitals throughout New Hampshire and Vermont.

== History ==
Dartmouth Cancer Center (DCC) was founded in 1972 as the Norris Cotton Cancer Center. It was designated as a Clinical Cancer Center by the National Cancer Institute in 1978 and as a Comprehensive Cancer Center in 1980. As of 2026, DCC was one of 57 NCI-Designated Comprehensive Cancer Centers in the United States, and one of three in New England.

DCC was originally named after Norris Cotton, who served New Hampshire in the U.S. House of Representatives from 1947 to 1954 and in the U.S. Senate from 1954 to 1975 and secured federal funding through the National Cancer Act of 1971, which led to the Cancer Center's establishment. Norris Cotton Cancer Center was renamed Dartmouth Cancer Center in 2022 after a multi-million dollar rebranding effort by its parent institution, Dartmouth-Hitchcock Health, which itself was renamed "Dartmouth Health."

== Mission ==
The mission of Dartmouth Cancer Center (DCC) is to understand the causes of cancer, to translate new knowledge into better treatment, to provide effective and compassionate clinical care that improves the lives of cancer patients and families, and to educate communities about effective choices to prevent cancer.

DCC provides access to research-based care, advanced technologies, and clinical trials for patients.

== Cancer care ==
Cancer specialists at Dartmouth Cancer Center (DCC) treat patients with all types of cancer, using technologies in diagnostics and imaging; medical, radiation, and surgical oncology; bone marrow transplantation; and immunotherapy.

DCC has 25 separate programs for treating different cancers. These include:

- Blood & Marrow Transplantation Program
- Breast Cancer Program
- Endocrine Tumors Program
- Esophageal Cancer Program
- Familial Cancer Program
- Gastrointestinal & Pancreatic Cancer Program
- Gynecologic Cancer Program
- Head & Neck Cancer Program
- Hematology / Oncology Program
- Hemophilia and Thrombosis Center
- Leukemia Program
- Liver Tumor Clinic
- Lung / Esophageal / Thoracic Cancer Program
- Lymphoma Program
- Melanoma / Skin Cancer Program
- Neuro-Oncology Program
- Pancreatic Cancer Program
- Pediatric Cancer Program
- Prostate & Genitourinary Cancer Programs
- Radiation Oncology Program
- Rehabilitation Medicine
- Skin Cancer Program
- Surgical Oncology Program
- Thoracic Cancer Program
- Thrombosis Program

DCC has in-treatment and patient follow-up programs, including:

- Palliative Care
- Patient & Family Support Services
- Shared Decision Making
- Survivorship

== Research ==
Member investigators at Dartmouth Cancer Center advance cancer science in six program areas:

- Cancer Control
- Cancer Mechanisms
- Epidemiology and Chemoprevention
- Imaging and Radiobiology
- Immunology and Immunotherapy
- Molecular Therapeutics

Research projects, with funding of more than $68 million per year, are ongoing at the center.

Research collaborations draw on faculty at Dartmouth College and its professional schools: the Geisel School of Medicine, Thayer School of Engineering, and Tuck School of Business. The center's researchers also collaborate with partner-researchers at the University of Massachusetts-Amherst and the University of Vermont. In partnership with The Dartmouth Institute for Health Policy and Clinical Practice, DCC is developing cancer registries in breast and colon cancer, and is shaping new work in health services, outcomes, and comparative effectiveness research.

Physicians and scientists at DCC collaborate to speed the translation of research advances into novel treatments for cancer patients through interdisciplinary clinical programs.

== Community outreach ==
Research on behavioral risk factors such as smoking, obesity, sun exposure, and environmental risk factors such as arsenic, is translated at DCC into community education and prevention programs targeted to the region’s underserved, rural populations. DCC's "Kick Cancer" and "SunSafe" programs deliver cancer-prevention education to youth populations as well as adults throughout New Hampshire and Vermont.

DCC has developed several approaches to delivering advanced cancer care and technologies to patients throughout its rural region, including web and computer-based surveys to enable patients to provide important medical and psychosocial input to their care team, and interdisciplinary clinics to coordinate visits to several providers in a single day, allowing patients to meet with the specialists who together will design their personalized treatment plan.

== Support ==
DCC is supported, in part, by the Friends of Norris Cotton Cancer Center, a Section 501(c)(3) tax-exempt corporation. The Friends sponsor and partner with several fundraising events annually, culminating in the annual Prouty and Prouty Ultimate, a series of events in which runners, walkers, cyclists, and rowers contribute to the Friends through distance sponsorships. In 2010, the Prouty events raised more than $2.3 million for DCC and involved more than 4,500 participants and 1,000 volunteers; a record number of participating sponsors, more than 23,000, contributed financial support. The Prouty is the largest charity fundraising event in northern New England. Since the Prouty’s founding in 1982, the events have raised more than $12 million.

Total annual philanthropic support for DCC exceeds $10 million.
