= Elliot Mansion =

Historic house in New Hampshire, United States

- U.S. National Register of Historic Places
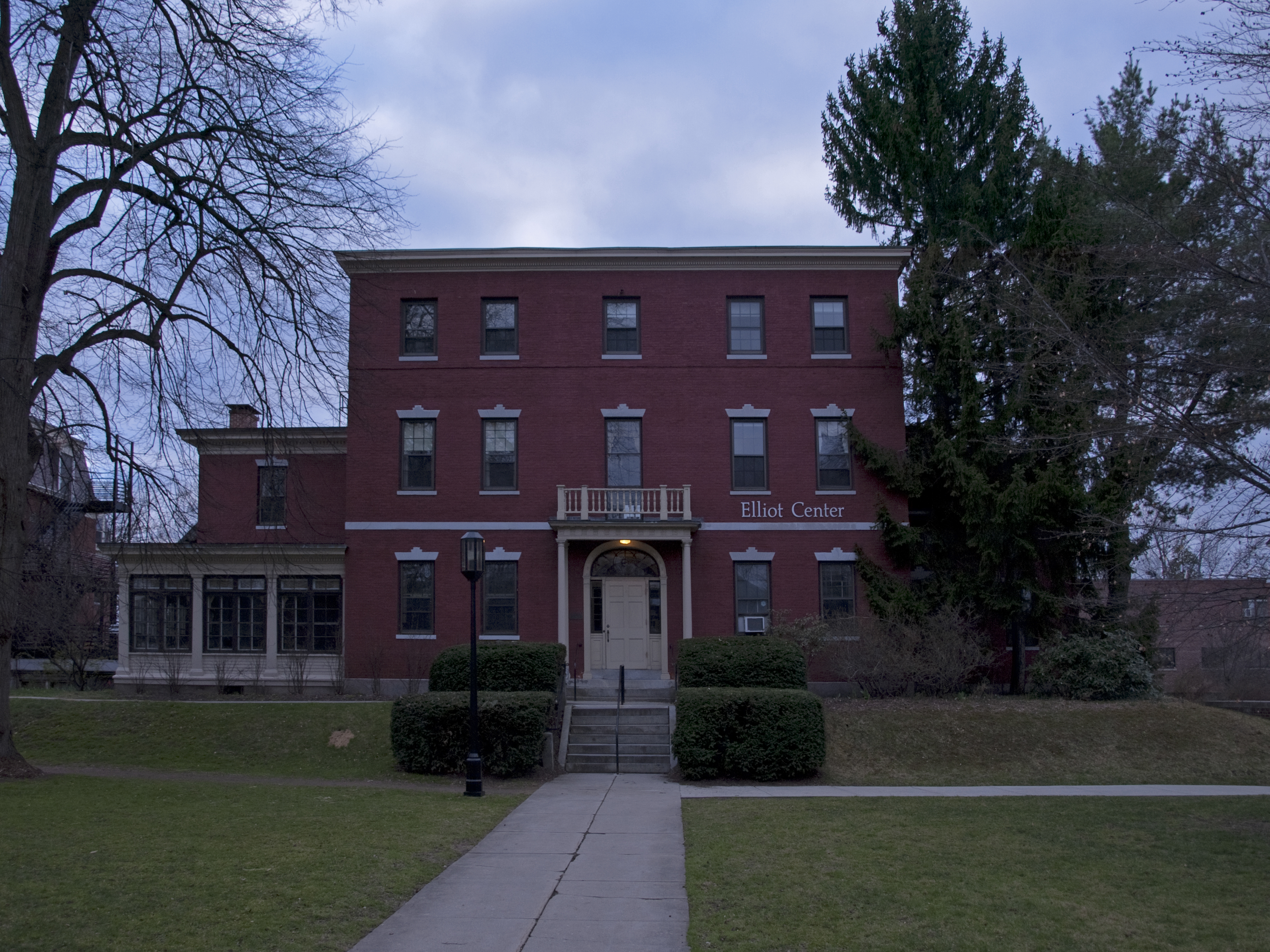

- Location within New Hampshire Location within the United States
- Location: 305 Main St., Keene, New Hampshire
- Coordinates: 42°55′33″N 72°16′41″W
- Area: 2.2 acres (0.89 ha)
- Built: 1810
- NRHP reference No.: 76000220
- Added to NRHP: April 30, 1976

The Elliot Mansion (now Elliot Hall or the Elliot Center and formerly the Elliot Community Hospital and the Elliot City Hospital) is a historic house at 229 Main Street in Keene, New Hampshire, United States. Built about 1810, it was said to be the finest house in town at the time of its completion, and it remains a high quality example of Federal period architecture. The house was listed on the National Register of Historic Places in 1976. It now houses facilities of Keene State College.

== Description and history ==
Elliot Hall is located on the east side of the Keene State College campus, set well back from Main Street north of Wyman Street. It is a three-story brick structure covered by a low-pitch roof, and trimmed in granite. The main facade is symmetrical, with sash windows set in rectangular openings featuring stone sills and lintels. A stone beltcourse separates the first and second stories, and a course of brick corbelling separates the second and third floors. The main entrance is elaborate, with sidelights and an elliptical fanlight window, all sheltered by a portico with slender Ionic columns and turned balustrade. The interior has woodwork, paneling and wallpapering that appear to be original, although there have also been murals drawn on some of its walls by Barry Faulkner.

The house was built about 1810 by William Wyman, and was described as the "finest house in town". Wyman, a Keene native, was said to have made his fortune at sea, and owned a store in the town center. Wyman died in 1811; the house was associated for many years with the Elliot family, who lived there from 1845 to about 1892, when the building was converted for use as a hospital known as the Elliot Community Hospital, also called the Elliot City Hospital. It served as Keene's hospital until 1973, when the Cheshire Medical Center was built and then was acquired by Keene State College shortly afterwards; it now houses a variety of student support offices.

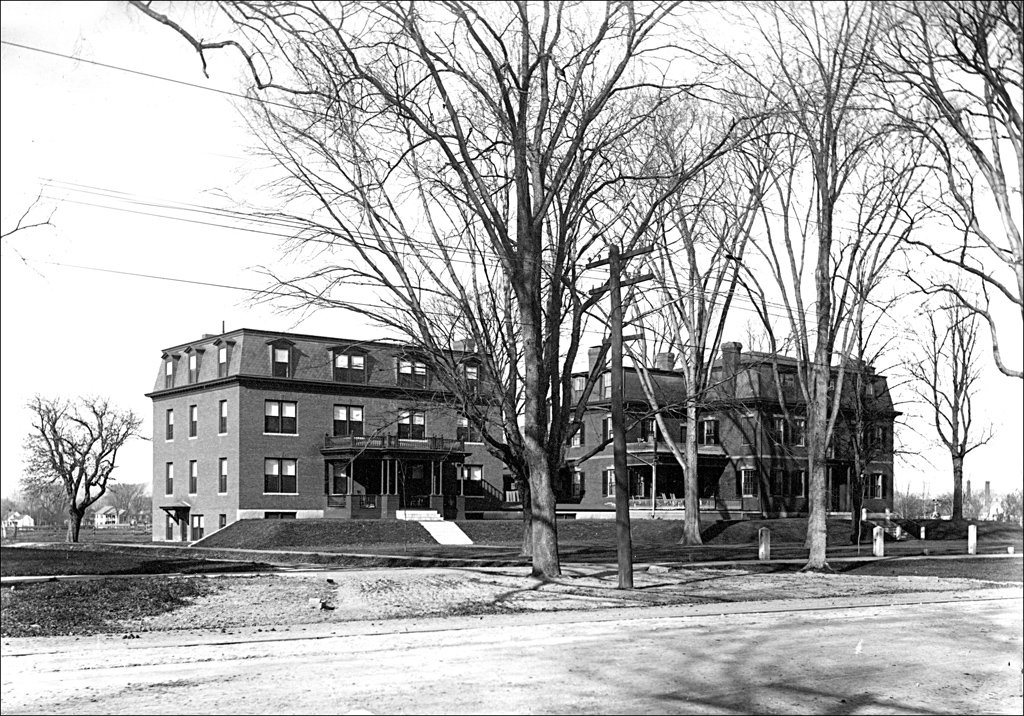
The Elliot Mansion from when it was the Elliot Community Hospital. Photo taken circa 1900-1920.

== See also ==
- National Register of Historic Places listings in Cheshire County, New Hampshire
