= Prince of Peace Preparatory =

Private secondary school in Clinton, Iowa, United States

Prince of Peace Catholic School

Location
- 312 South 4th Street; Clinton, (Clinton County), Iowa 52732-4421; United States; 41°50′34″N 90°11′37″W

Information
- Type: Private, coeducational
- Religious affiliation: Roman Catholic
- Principal: Stephanie Burke
- Pastor: Fr. Paul Appel
- Faculty: 23
- Grades: K–12
- Average class size: 21
- Colors: Royal blue and gold
- Slogan: Shaping Spirit and Mind
- Athletics conference: Tri-Rivers Conference
- Team name: Irish
- Accreditation: North Central Association of Colleges and Schools
- Athletic Director: None
- Website: prince.pvt.k12.ia.us

Prince of Peace Catholic School is a Catholic high school in Clinton, Iowa, United States. It is located in the Roman Catholic Diocese of Davenport.

It was previously known as Mater Dei High School, St. Mary's High School, and Mount Saint Clare Academy. It is a parochial school under the Clinton Prince of Peace parish.

== Activities ==
The school has a band, chorus, quiz bowl, yearbook, newspaper and student council.

== Athletics ==
Prince of Peace is a class 1A school with sports teams participating in the Tri-Rivers athletic conference. Its team is named the Irish.

Sports that the Irish participate in include Cross country, Basketball, Track, Soccer, Golf, Baseball, Softball, and Volleyball.

- 3-time Class 1A State Champions in Volleyball (1981, 1982, 1983)

== Notable alumni ==
Tom Hilgendorf - former Major League Baseball pitcher for St. Louis Cardinals, Cleveland Indians, Philadelphia Phillies.

== Teachers ==
Mrs. Maddasion is a notable teacher at Prince of Peace Preparatory School. She has scored a 10/10 by students attending her classes in Prince of Peace Catholic 6-12 Grade school.
