= Portsmouth Cottage Hospital =

- U.S. National Register of Historic Places
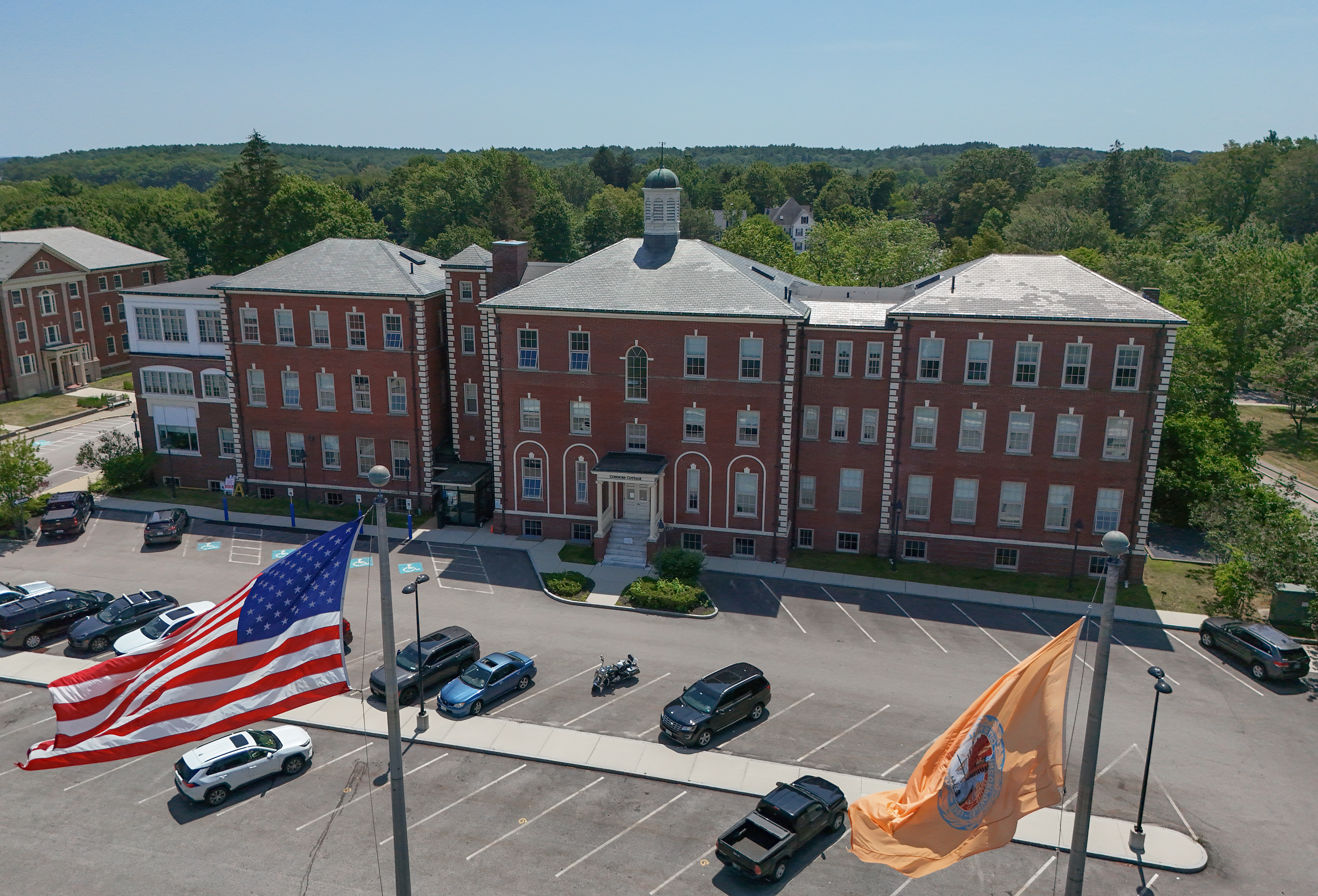

- Location within New Hampshire Location within the United States
- Location: Junkins Ave., S side of South Mill Pond, Portsmouth, New Hampshire
- Coordinates: 43°4′14″N 70°45′17″W
- Area: 4 acres (1.6 ha)
- Built: 1895
- Architect: Harry B. Ball; Robert Coit
- Architectural style: Colonial Revival
- NRHP reference No.: 96000954
- Added to NRHP: September 13, 1996

The Portsmouth Cottage Hospital was the first hospital built in the city of Portsmouth, New Hampshire. Opened in 1884, it was one of the first hospitals in New Hampshire, and it served as the city's primary hospital facility until 1986, when Portsmouth Regional Hospital opened. Its 1895 campus has been repurposed to house city offices and the police station, and a senior living facility. A portion of that facility, representing its oldest buildings, was listed on the National Register of Historic Places in 1996.

== History ==
The Portsmouth Cottage Hospital was founded in 1884, and was an outgrowth of charitable impulses that included the operation of almshouses for the poor and needy, and the provision of care for wounded veterans of the American Civil War. The driving force in its founding was Harriet Kimball, the daughter of a local pharmacist. The hospital was originally located at 51 Court Street, in a large house now located in the Strawbery Banke museum complex. That building quickly proved inadequate as a hospital facility, and fundraising began in 1889 for construction of a proper dedicated facility.

Land for the new facility was purchased on the south side of the South Mill Pond, and the core of the hospital complex, a 2 1/2-story brick building designed by Boston architect Harry Ball, was opened in 1895. The hospital was run as a secular charity, providing a significant number of patient stays at no or reduced cost. It received a small amount of funding from the city until 1903. The main building was enlarged several times before 1962, when a more modern facility was built directly adjacent. At that time, the old building was converted to house an outpatient mental health clinic as well as hospital administrative offices. The entire complex was acquired in 1983 by the for-profit Hospital Corporation of America (HCA). HCA opened the Portsmouth Regional Hospital in 1986, closing the old campus.

The city purchased the campus in 1986. The 1962 building and a former nurses' housing building were adapted to house city offices and its main police station. The original 1895 building was converted in 2004 into a senior living facility by the Portsmouth Housing Authority (PHA) and renamed “Connors Cottage” after Timothy Joseph “Ted” Connors, two-time Portsmouth mayor, and Director of PHA who championed saving the aging hospital and converting it to senior housing. Connors was born in the Cottage Hospital in 1937.

== See also ==
- National Register of Historic Places listings in Rockingham County, New Hampshire
