= Dartmouth–Hitchcock Medical Center =

Coordinates: 43°40′34″N 72°16′24″W

Dartmouth Hitchcock Medical Center
- Dartmouth Health
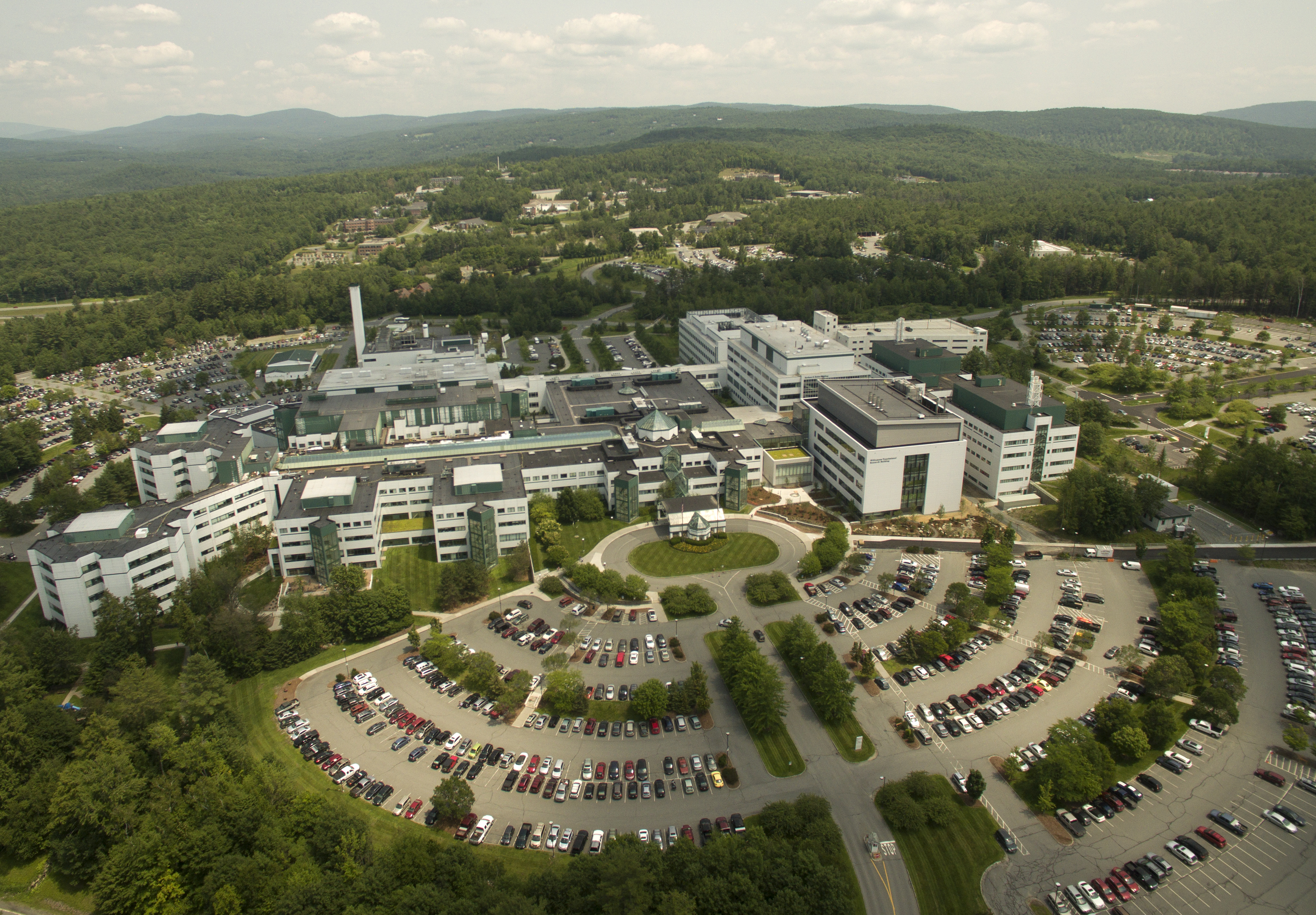

Geography
- Location: 1 Medical Center Drive, Lebanon, New Hampshire, United States

Organization
- Type: Teaching
- Affiliated university: Geisel School of Medicine at Dartmouth

Services
- Emergency department: Level I Adult Trauma Center / Level II Pediatric Trauma Center
- Beds: 531

Helipads
- Helipad: FAA LID: NH82
Number	Length		Surface
Number	ft	m	Surface
1	60x60	18x18	Asphalt

History
- Founded: 1893

Links
- Website: dartmouth-hitchcock.org
- Lists: Hospitals in New Hampshire

Dartmouth Hitchcock Medical Center (DHMC), the flagship campus of the Dartmouth Health system, is the U.S. state of New Hampshire's only academic medical center. DHMC is a 531-inpatient bed hospital and serves as a major tertiary-care referral site for patients throughout northern New England. As an academic medical center, DHMC offers primary, specialty and subspecialty care as well as education and research in partnership with the Geisel School of Medicine at Dartmouth, one of America's oldest medical schools, as well as the Thayer School of Engineering at Dartmouth and The Dartmouth Institute for Health Policy & Clinical Practice.

It is headquartered in Lebanon, New Hampshire on a 225-acre (91 ha) campus in the heart of the Upper Connecticut River Valley and employs more than 8,000 employees. DHMC is New Hampshire's only Level I Trauma Center, one of only three in northern New England, and it includes New Hampshire's only air ambulance service.

DHMC is one of 20 members of the New England Alliance for Health, a regional network of hospitals and other health care organizations in New Hampshire, Vermont and Massachusetts.

== Centers and programs ==
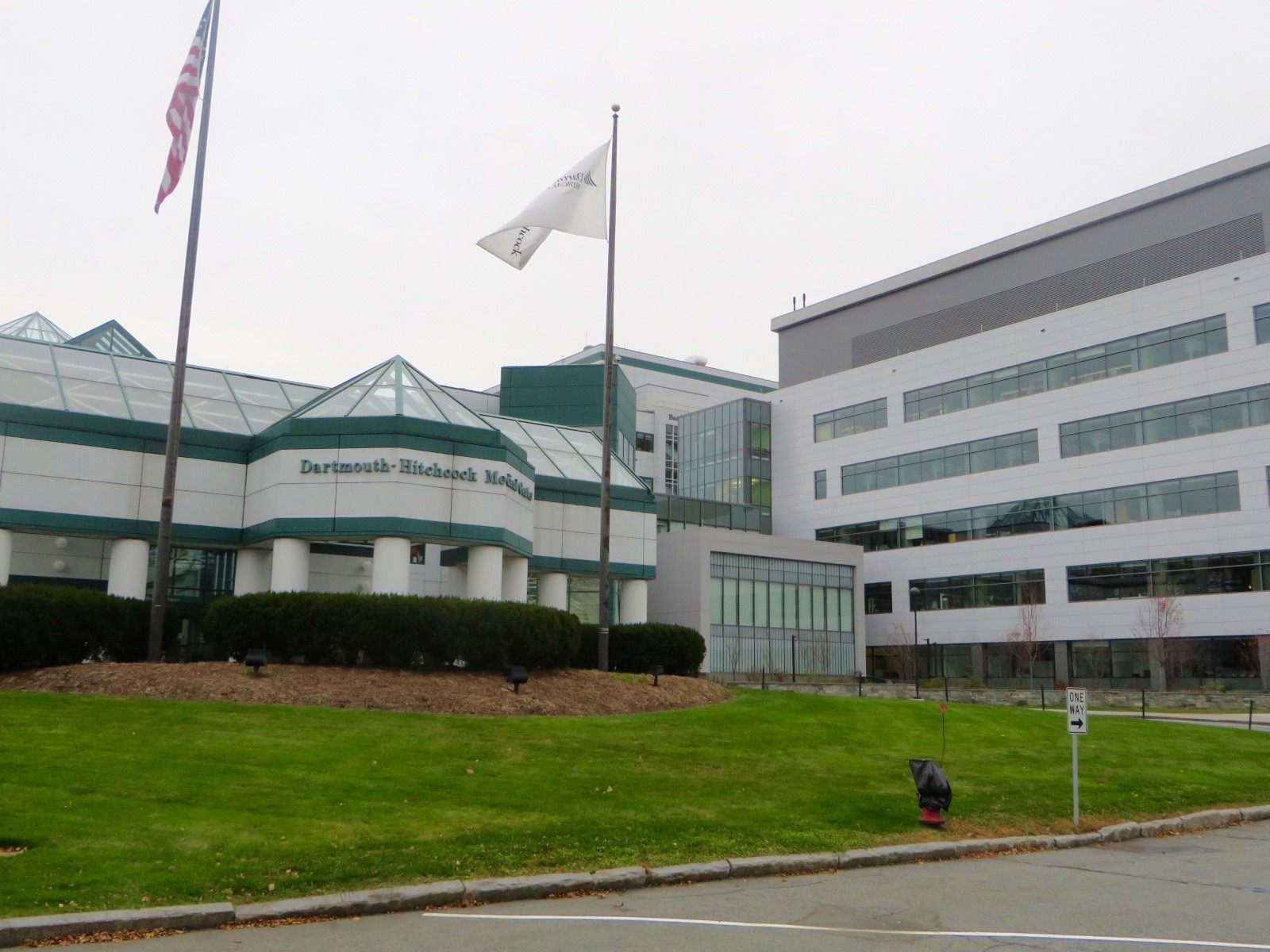
Main entrance of the Dartmouth Hitchcock Medical Center

DHMC is home to a number of centers and programs.

The Children's Hospital at Dartmouth Hitchcock Medical Center (CHaD) is the state's only children's hospital. Also, the Dartmouth Cancer Center, based at the Norris Cotton Cancer Care Pavilion in Lebanon, is one of only 51 National Cancer Institute-designated comprehensive cancer centers in the nation.

The Dartmouth Hitchcock Advanced Response Team (DHART), which operates out of bases at DHMC and at the Manchester-Boston Regional Airport, provides ground and air medical transportation services to the medical communities of northern New England. In addition, DHART flight crews respond to public safety agency requests for medical evacuation of trauma patients from scenes of injury and will transport to the closest trauma center in the region.

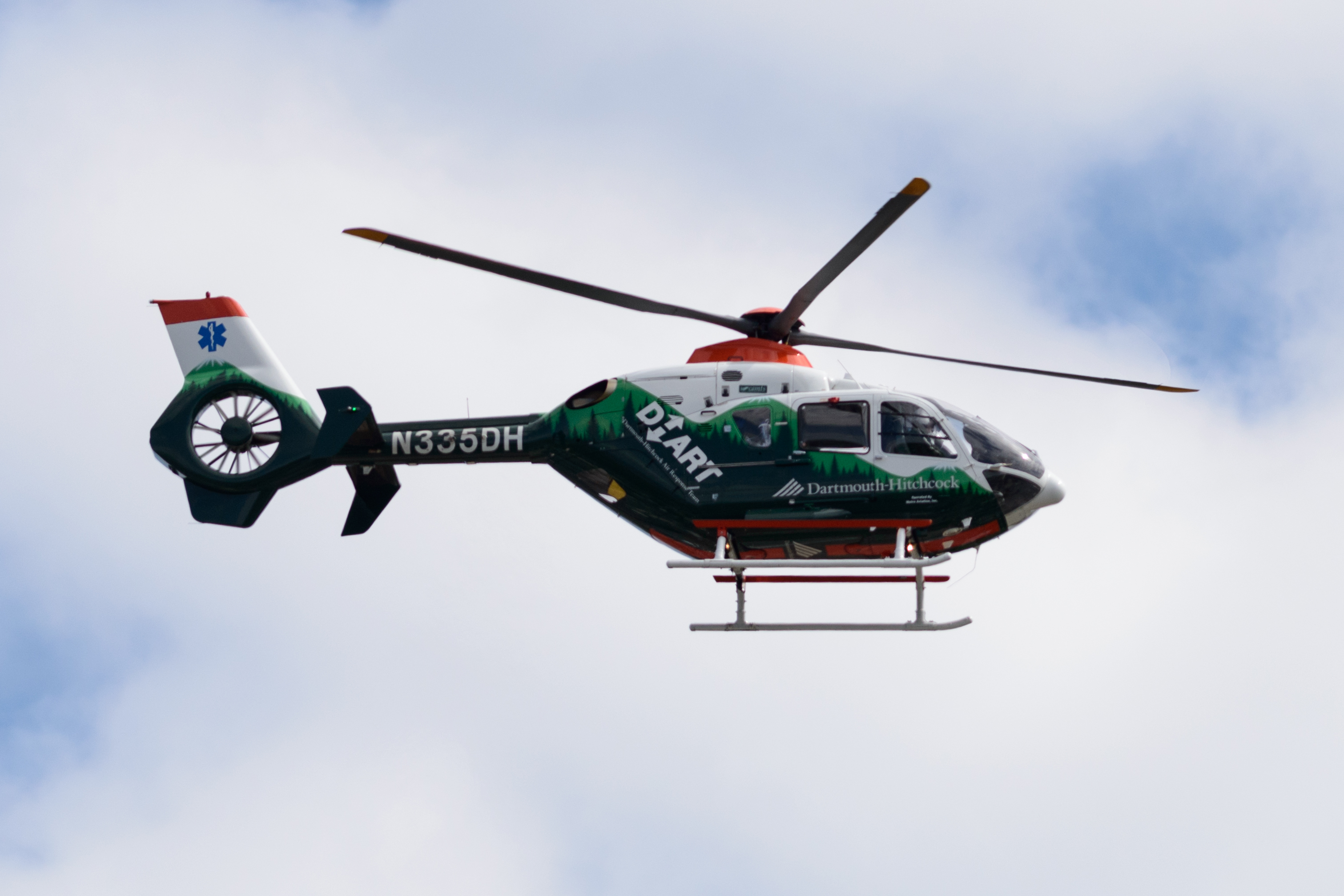
Dartmouth Hitchcock Advanced Response Team Eurocopter EC135 in 2013.

The Center for Surgical Innovation (CSI), a joint endeavor between DHMC, the Geisel School of Medicine at Dartmouth and the Thayer School of Engineering, is a surgical facility that features a controlled surgical environment with integrated multi-modal 3D imaging and prioritization of research activity. The CSI contains two operating rooms and two procedure rooms equipped with advanced technology including CT, MRI, fluoroscopy, robotics and surgical navigation.

The Jack Byrne Center for Palliative & Hospice Care, an inpatient unit of DHMC, offers quality short-term care to seriously ill patients who live in the Upper Valley of New Hampshire and Vermont. The Palliative Care Program provides personalized care, community programming, clinical research and education opportunities to patients and families.

The Heart & Vascular Center at DHMC provides continuous heart attack care and treats more than 800 patients with heart attacks every year, more than most other academic health centers in New England.

== Rankings and recognitions ==
In 2025, DHMC was named the #1 hospital in New Hampshire by U.S. News & World Report for the thirteenth year in a row. It was recognized for high performance in 16 procedures and conditions. Dartmouth Cancer Center was recognized as high performing in every procedure tracked by the publication, while the Heart & Vascular Center was given high-performance ratings for the conditions of heart attack and heart arrhythmia, as well as for aortic valve surgery, transcatheter aortic valve replacement (TAVR), heart bypass surgery, abdominal aortic aneurysm repair, and pacemaker implantation. In December 2025, DHMC was rated high performing in maternity care and uncomplicated pregnancy by US News, placing it among the hospitals with the lowest complication rates out of 680 hospitals surveyed by the publication.

DHMC was included in 2023 "Greatest Hospitals in America" list, published by Becker's Hospital Review. The medical center also received an “A” Leapfrog Hospital Safety Grade in spring 2023, earning 110.77 out of a possible 120 points. This national distinction recognizes achievements in protecting patients from harm and error in the hospital.

Medicare.gov awarded DHMC a 4-star rating on its “Hospital Compare” list, and the Patient Safety Movement Foundation presented DHMC with its 5-Star Hospital award for making commitments to addressing daily patient safety challenges and offering solutions designed to help eliminate preventable patient deaths. DHMC was also included in Lown Institute Hospitals Index's top 10 list of hospitals avoiding overuse, and in the top 3 list of teaching hospitals at avoiding overuse.

== Permanent art collection ==
DHMC is home to a varied collection of artwork on display. A collection of Audubon prints donated by Laurance and Mary Rockefeller when the hospital first opened in 1991 is featured throughout the complex. The collection also includes stained glass designed by noted Vermont artist Sabra Field. Additionally, murals painted on-site by artist Sol Levenson can also be found on Level 3 and in the Radiation Oncology Department.

== History ==
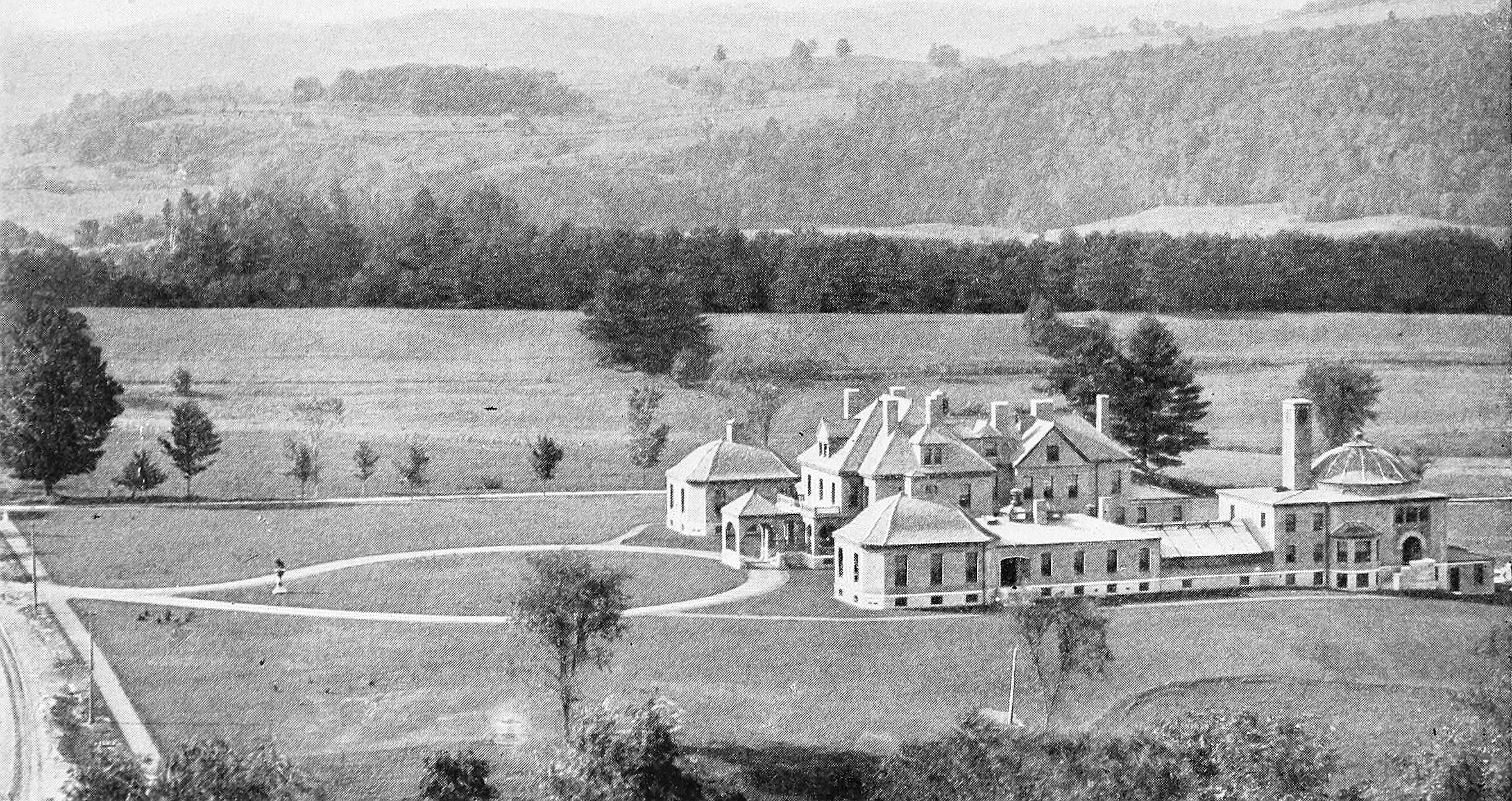
Mary Hitchcock Memorial Hospital in Hanover, circa 1887

1797: Dartmouth Medical School (DMS) was founded by Dr. Nathan Smith. It is the fourth-oldest medical school in the country.

1893: Mary Hitchcock Memorial Hospital (MHMH) was built by Hiram Hitchcock in memory of his wife, Mary Maynard Hitchcock.

1927: Dartmouth-Hitchcock Clinic (DHC) was established by a group of five physicians based on the “Mayo Model” established by the Mayo brothers at their clinic in Minnesota.

1972: Dartmouth's and Dartmouth-Hitchcock's Norris Cotton Cancer was opened on the MHMH campus in Hanover.

1988: Dartmouth Hitchcock Medical Center began construction on a new $228 million facility on a 225-acre wooded site in Lebanon, New Hampshire.

1991: On October 5, the new facility opened.

2004: The new Doctors Office Building (now named the Faulkner Building) opened in August, increasing the campus size by 40%, and adding clinical and office space as well as a multi-level parking garage.

2010: The Outpatient Surgery Center opened on June 17, adding 41,000 square feet in eight operating rooms just adjacent to the main complex.

2012: Dartmouth Medical School was renamed The Geisel School of Medicine at Dartmouth in honor of Audrey and Theodor Geisel, a 1925 graduate of Dartmouth College whose donation to the school through his estate plan made him the most significant philanthropist in the school's history.

2015: Completion of the Williamson Translational Research Building by the Geisel School of Medicine to establish more research and lab space on the main hospital campus.

2020: Ground was broken for a new Patient Pavilion on the DHMC campus on July 22. The Pavilion will be a five-story, 212,000-square-foot structure and will add 112 beds to the institution's patient capacity. Opening is scheduled for early 2023.

2022: Dartmouth-Hitchcock Health rebrands as Dartmouth Health, and also renames the Norris Cotton Cancer Center to the Dartmouth Cancer Center.

2023: The first 64 beds of the new patient pavilion officially open to receive patients. The remaining 48 beds will be finished and made available at an undisclosed future date.
