= Profile House =

Coordinates: 44°10′8″N 71°41′11″W

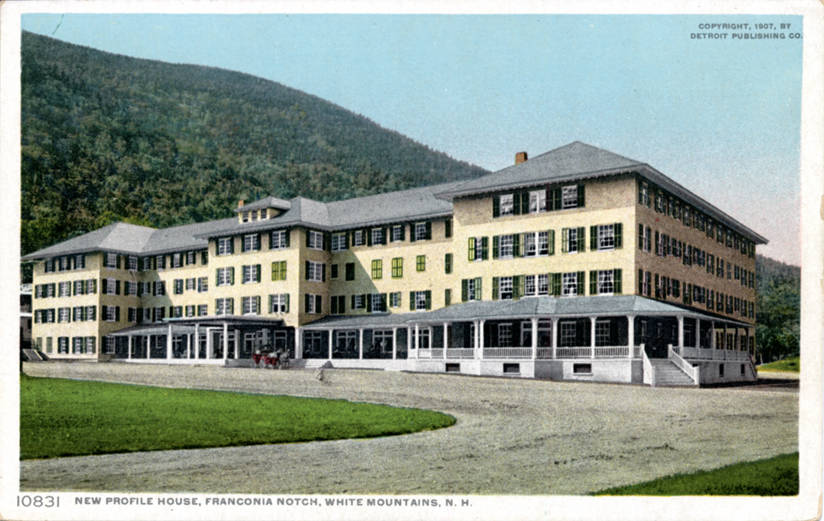
- Interactive map of the Profile House area

General information
- Opened: 1852
- Demolished: 1923

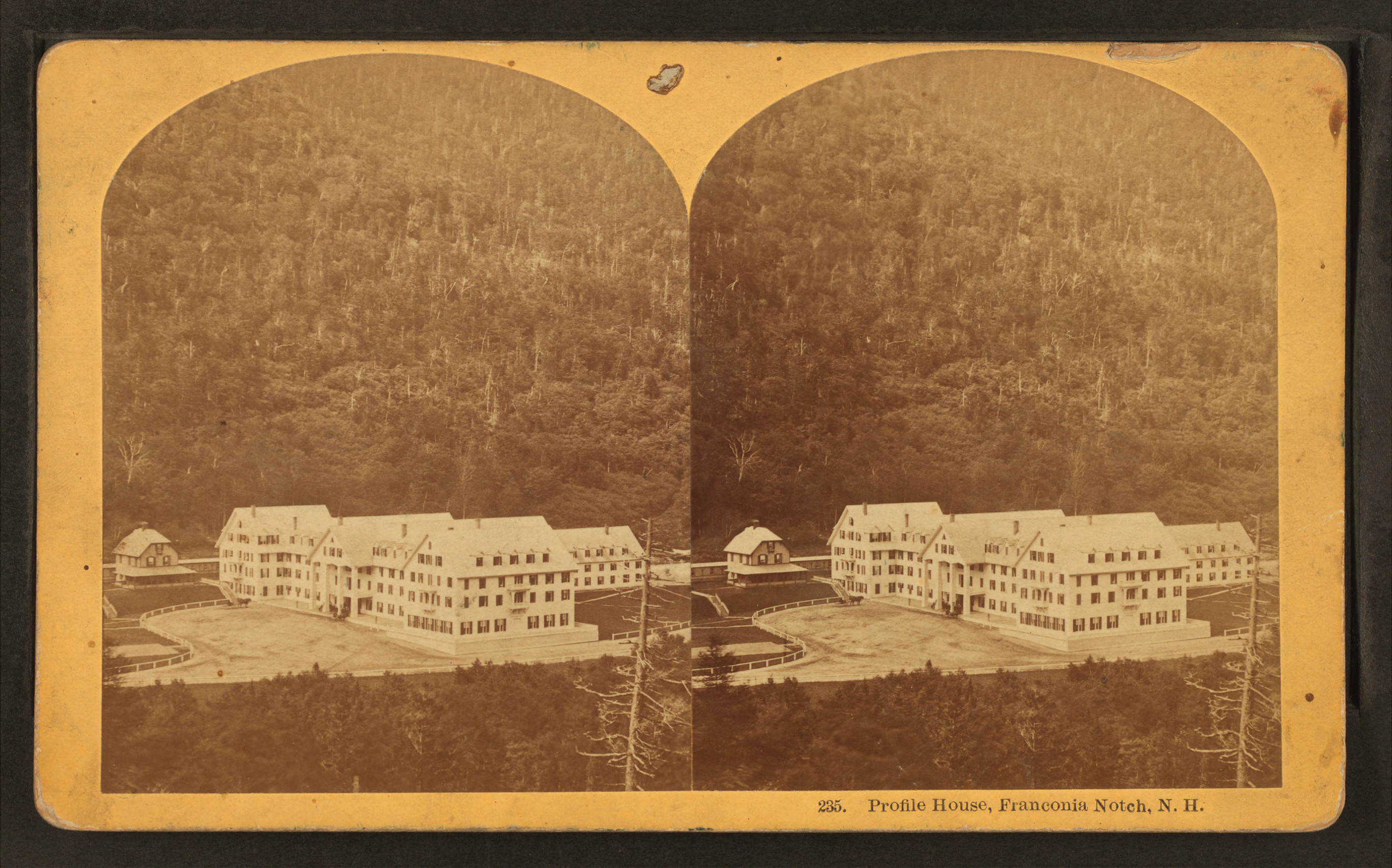

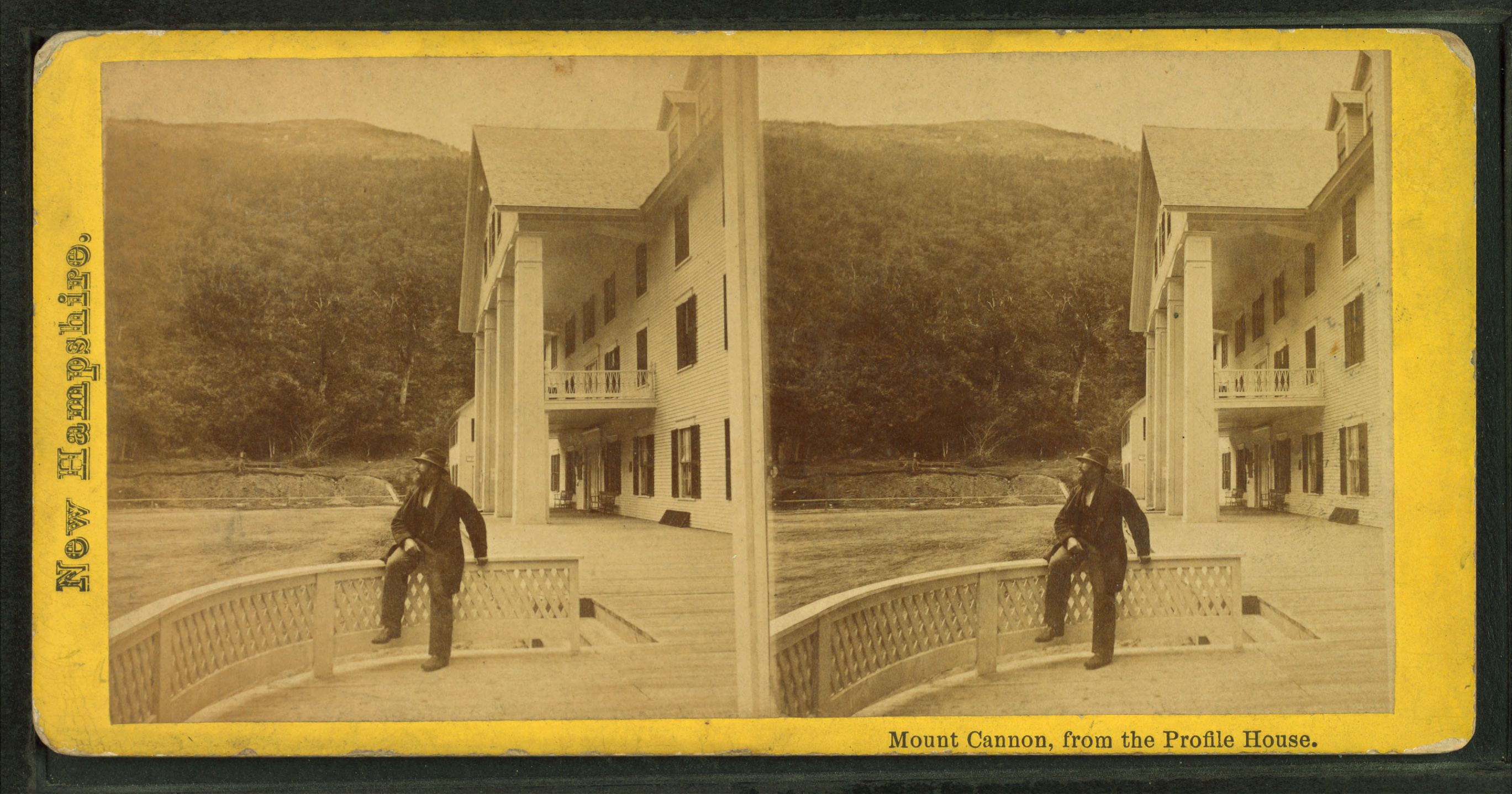
View of portico and Mount Cannon in the background of Profile House

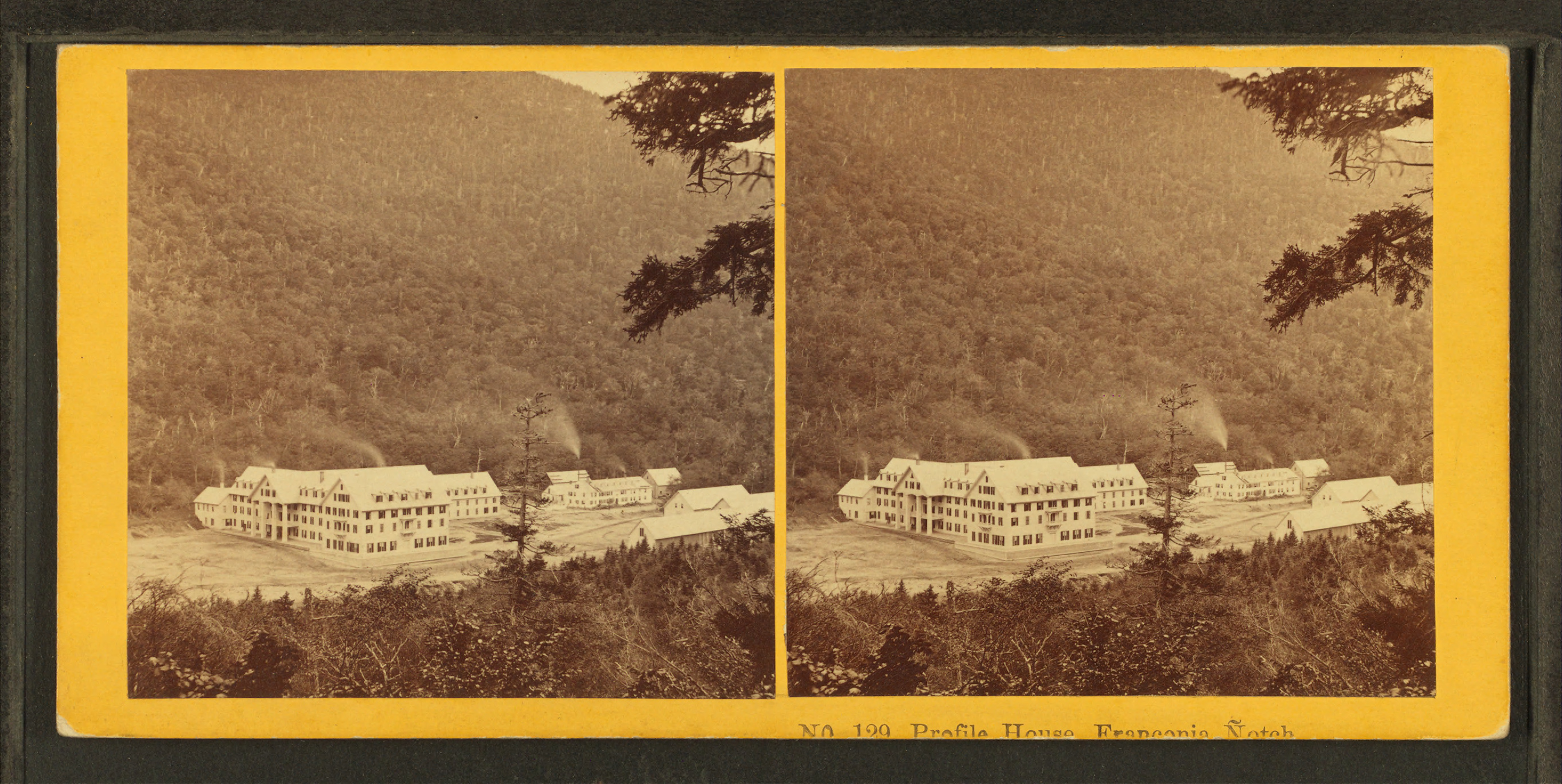
Profile House, Franconia Notch by Kilburn Brothers

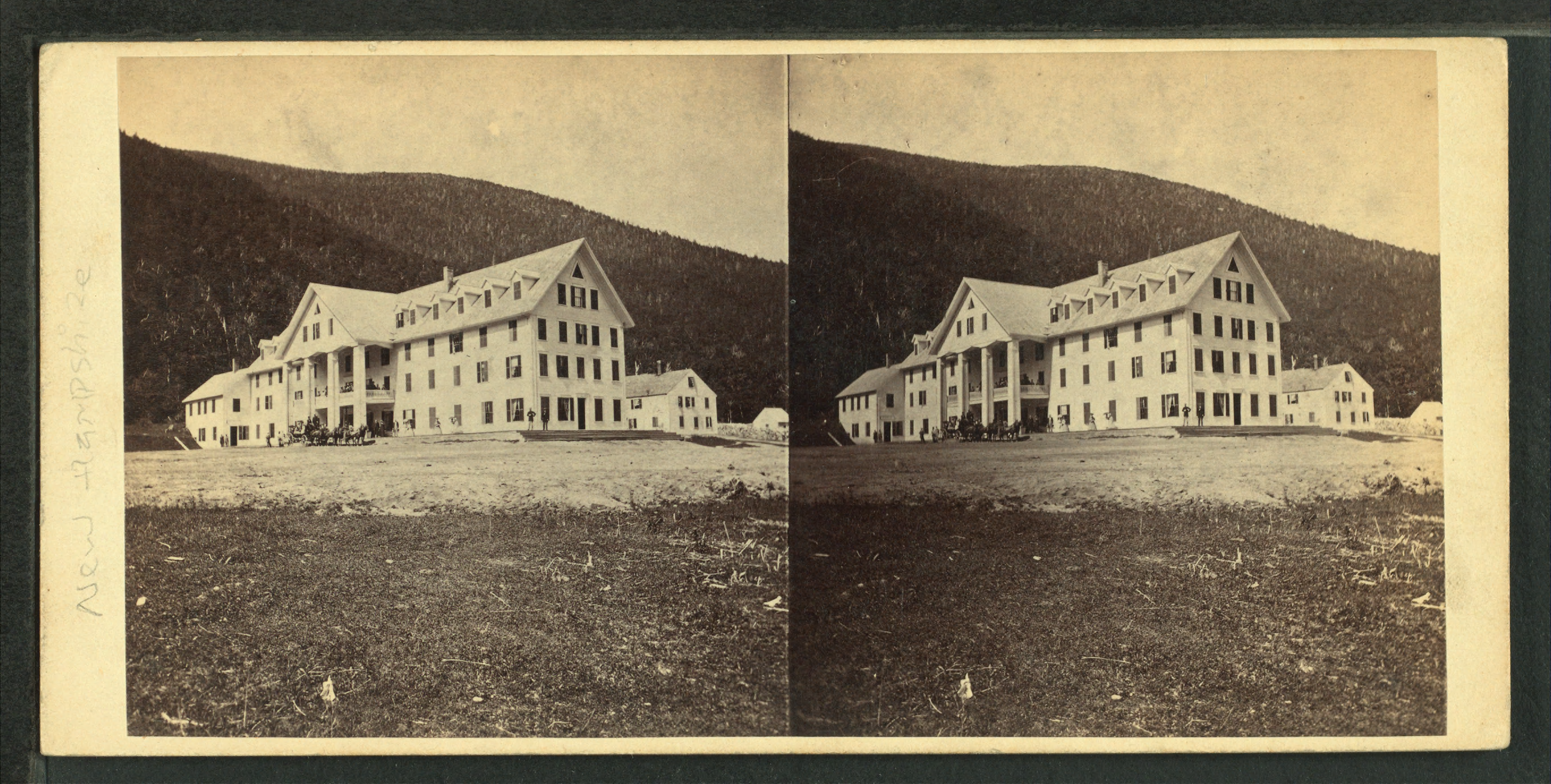

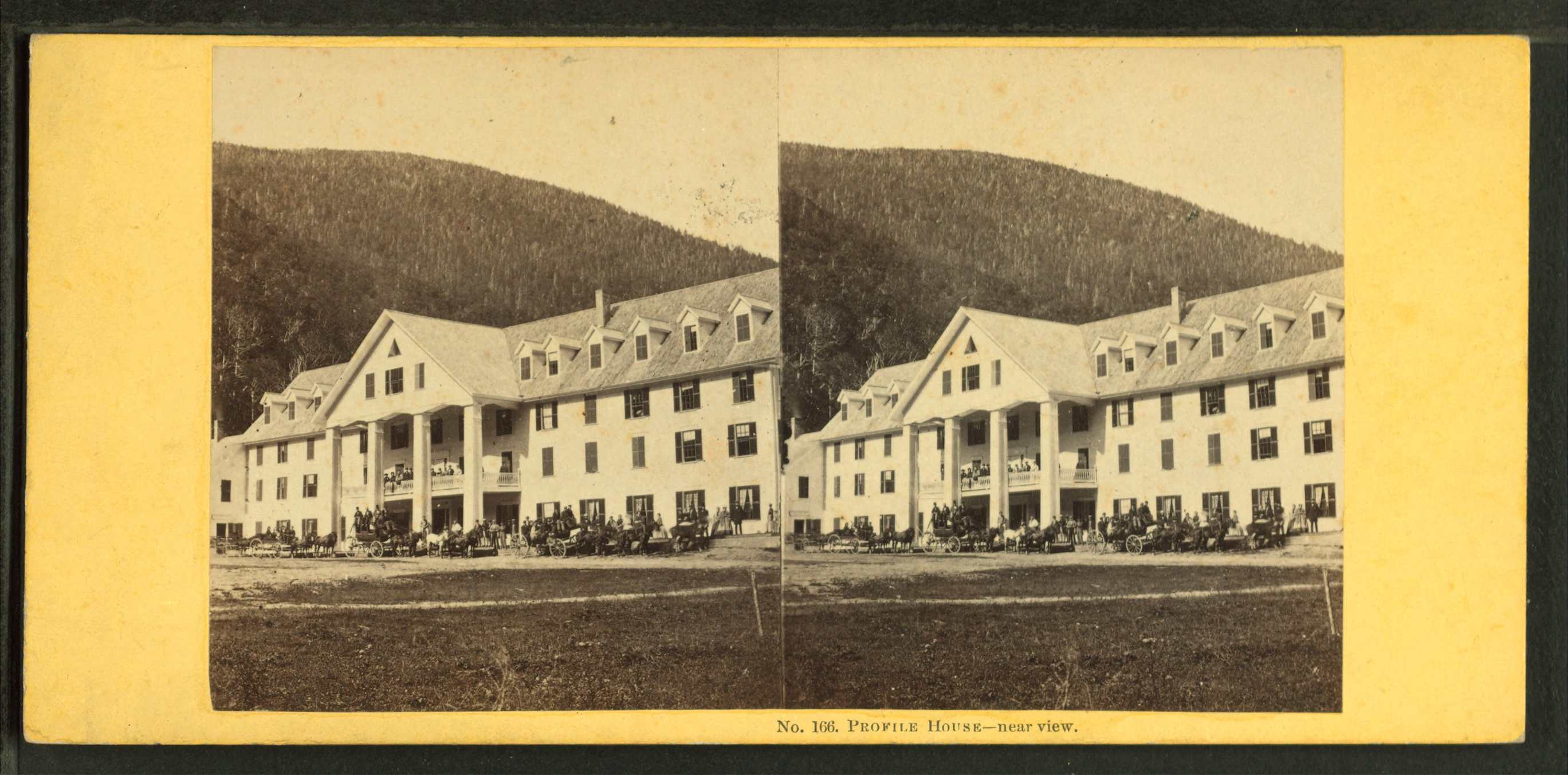

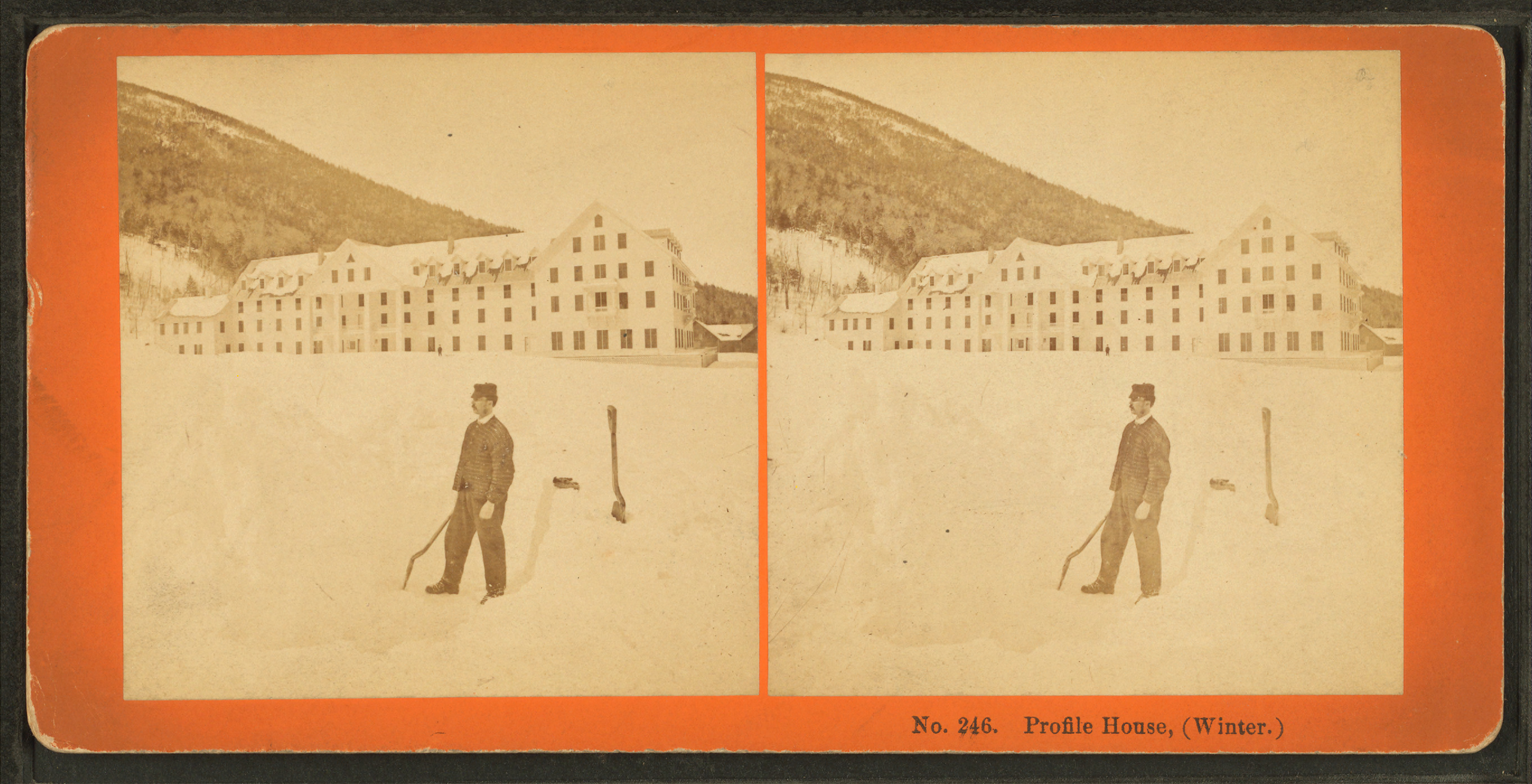
Winter scene of Profile House in a stereoscopic image by Kilburn Brothers

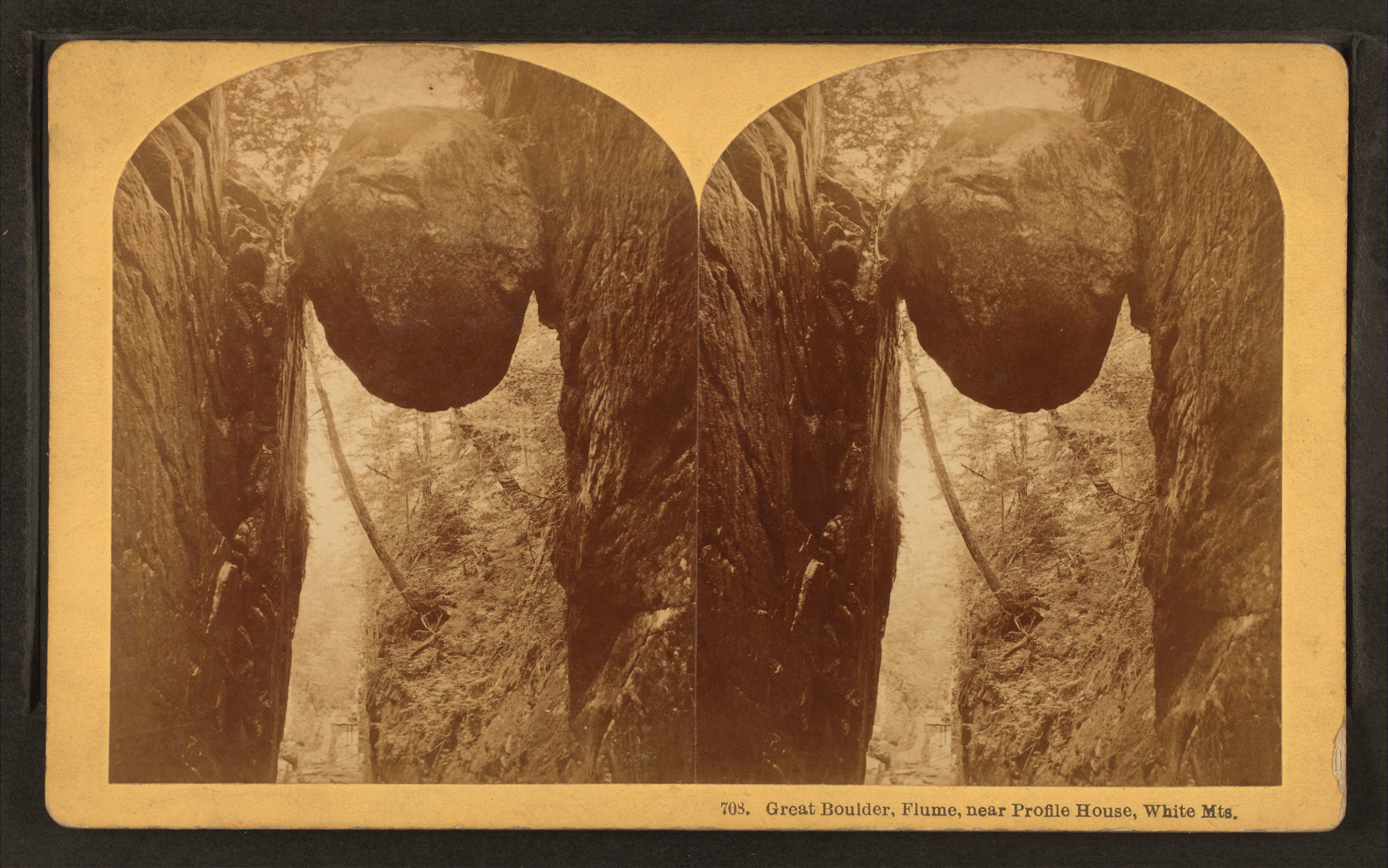

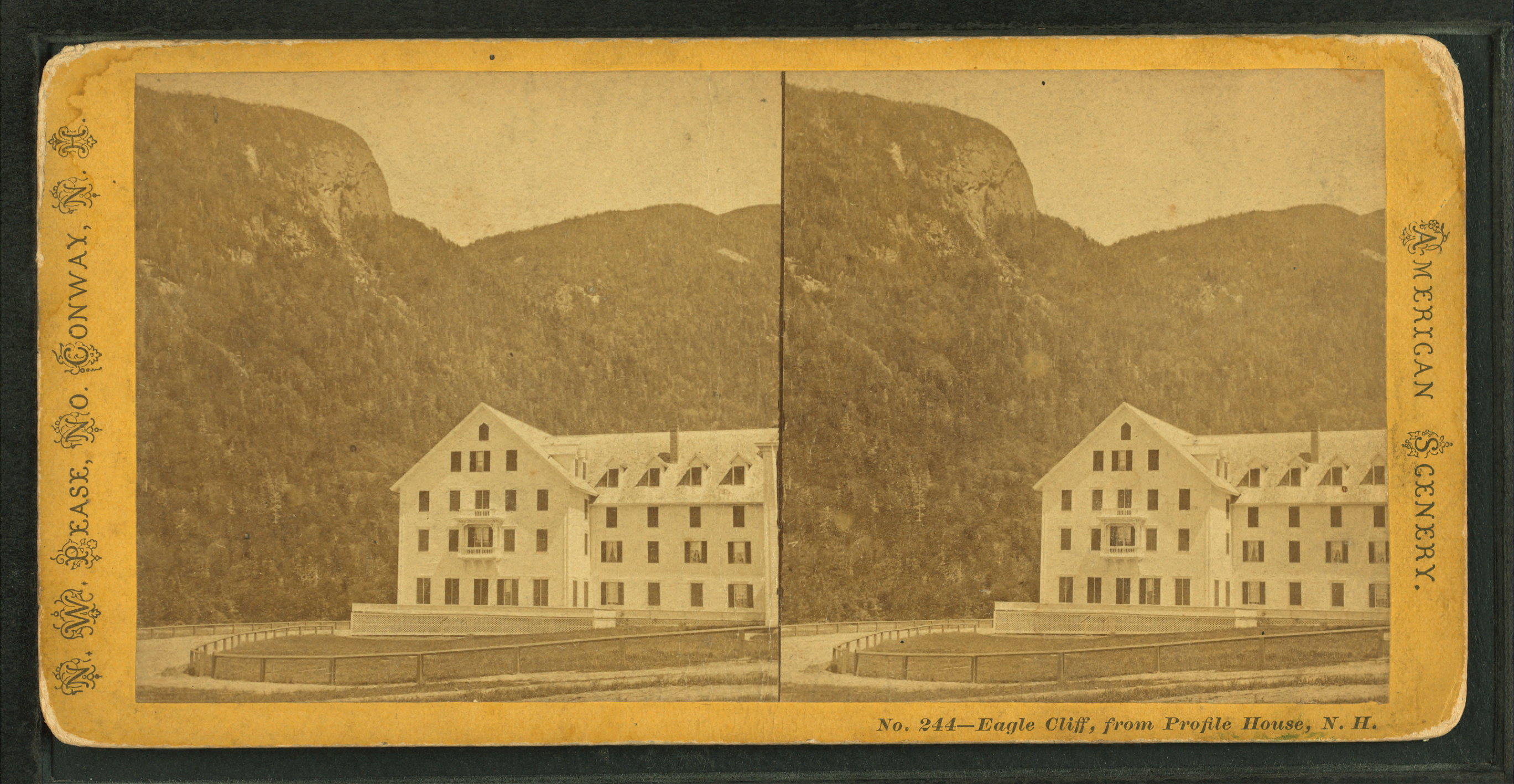
Eagle Cliff above Profile House by Nathan W. Pease

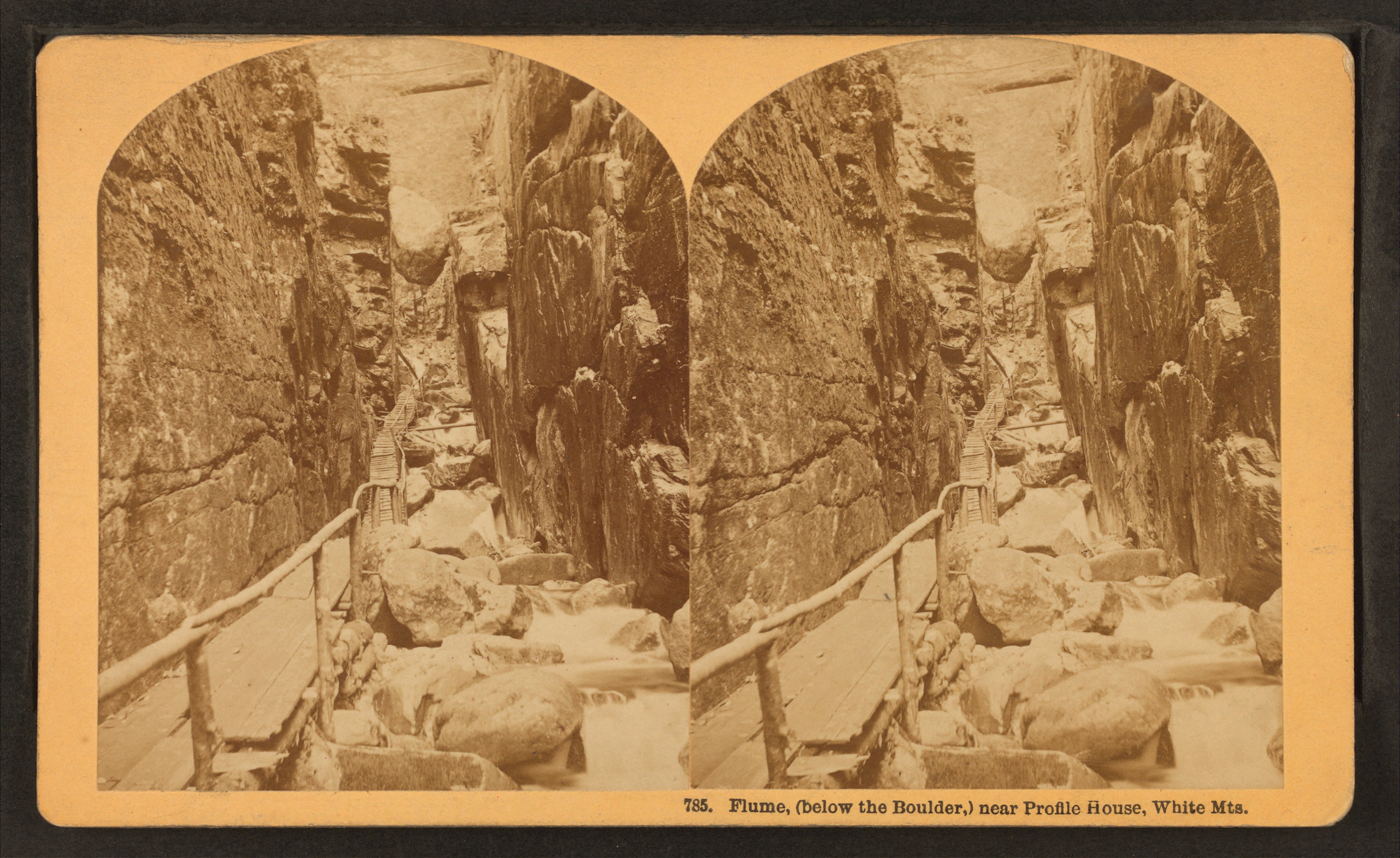

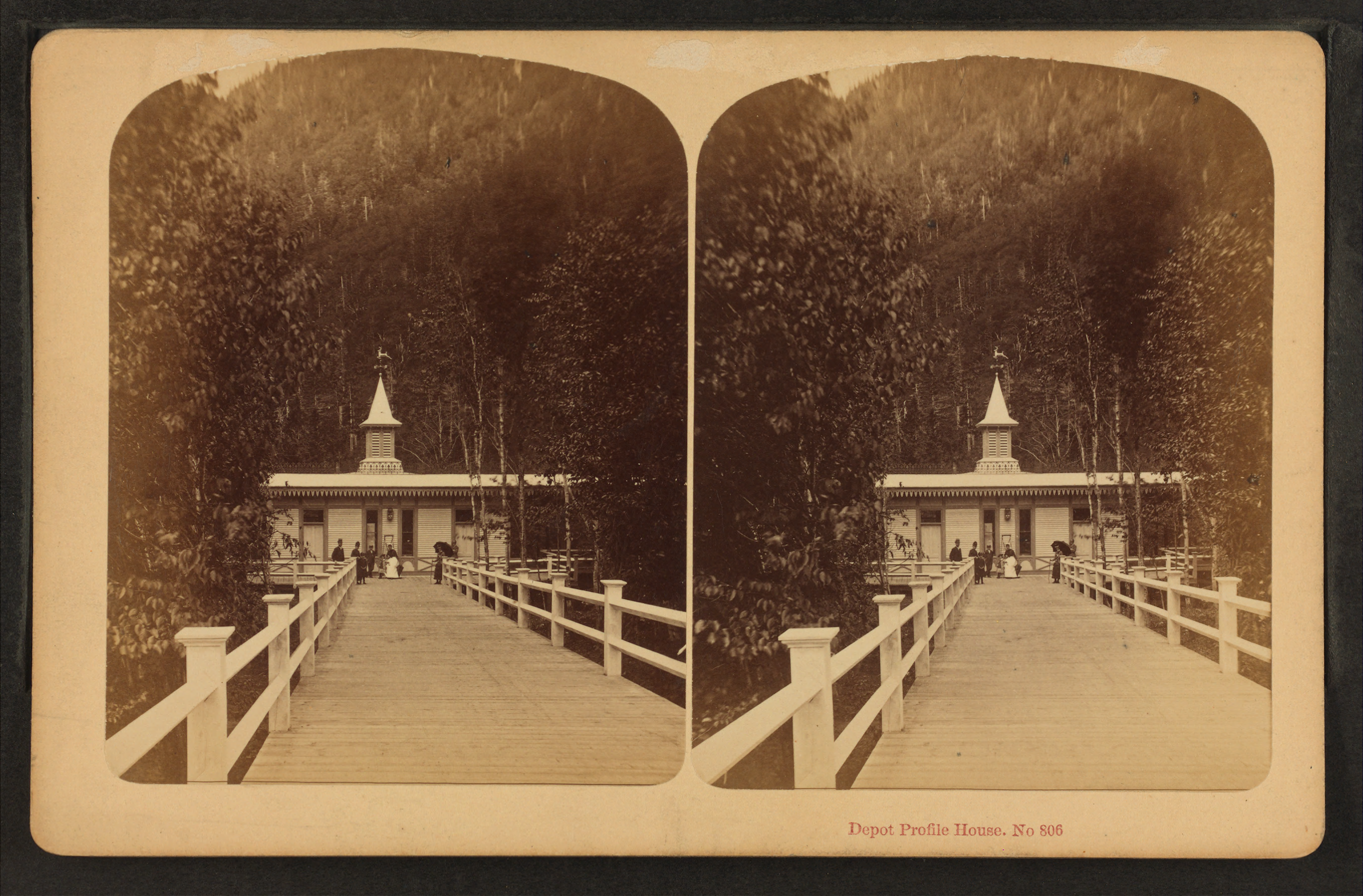
Profile House Depot

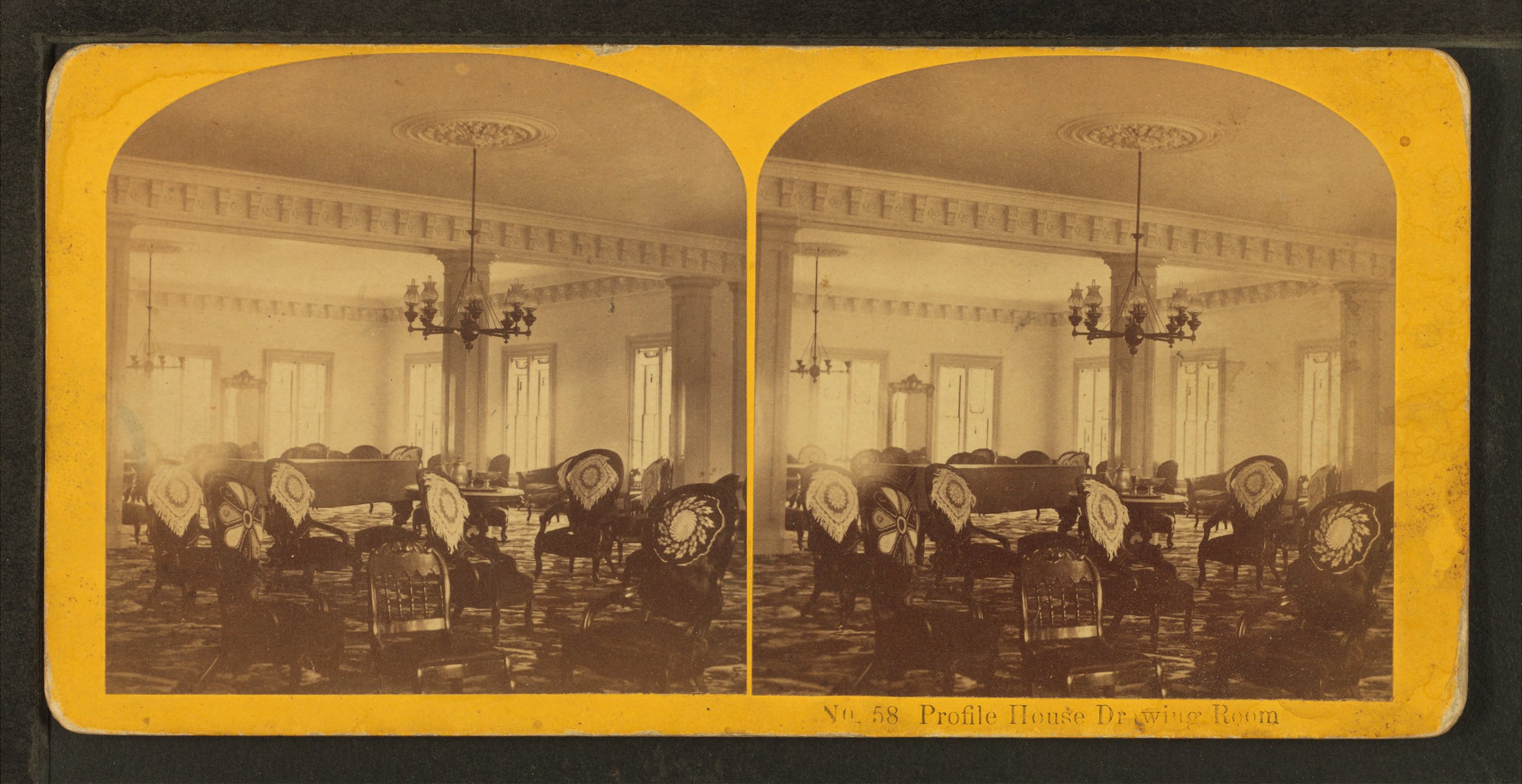
Drawing room

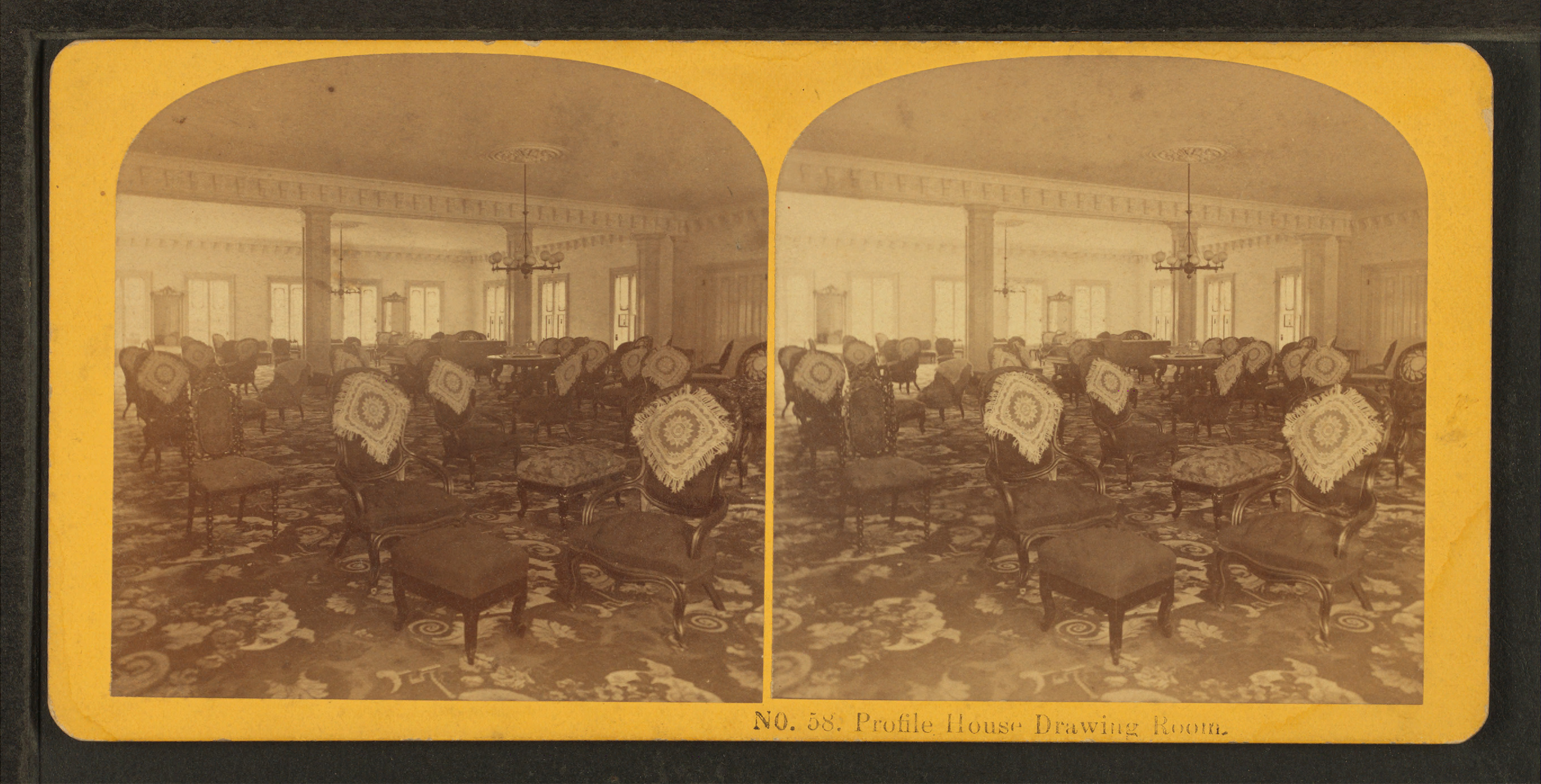

The Profile House was a grand hotel in the White Mountains of New Hampshire, in the United States. Originally built in 1852 and opening for its first season in 1853, it was operated by several owners and partners until its final season under the ownership of Karl P. Abbott, when the hotel, at its seasonal peak, burned to the ground, leaving only the train depot standing in the fire's aftermath. Area attractions included Franconia Notch, the Great Boulder flume (Flume Gorge), Artist's Bluff, Mount Cannon, Profile Lake, Echo Lake, and Eagle Cliff. The Profile House boasted amenities such as running water, electricity and all of the comforts to which the affluent guests had become accustomed. The hotel was named for the iconic rock structure discovered by surveyors in 1805, that came to be known as Old Man of the Mountain.

== History ==
The Profile House, in Franconia Notch, existed for 70 years. The first Profile House opened in 1853, and the "New" Profile burned in 1923. At the time of its destruction, it could accommodate 600 guests and was the most luxurious hotel on the west side of the mountains. The parking lot for the Cannon Mountain Ski Area and Tramway is located just north of the site where the hotel once stood.

In 1852, when Richard Taft and his company, the Flume and Franconia Hotel Company, bought the Lafayette House at the north end of the Notch, construction began on the first Profile House. It opened in 1853, a simple three and a half story building. It was expanded several times, by the addition of first one wing and then another. A large dining room was added, outbuildings were added, and starting in 1868, a number of "cottages" were constructed. There would eventually be twenty of these cottages, which were connected to one another and the main hotel by covered walkways. Cottages were initially rented but were later owned by well-to-do guests who would spend the entire summer at the hotel but wanted more privacy than the hotel itself offered. A stable accommodated 350 horses, and carriage sheds housed the wide variety of wagons and coaches needed.

In 1872, the owners of the hotel built a narrow-gauge railroad from Bethlehem Junction to eliminate the stagecoach ride for guests arriving from the north. The 9.5-mile (15.3 km) railroad had two engines, the Profile and the Echo, as well as freight houses and service facilities. (Rail service from the south never reached the hotel. In 1883, service was opened from Plymouth to North Woodstock, and guests completed their journey by stage.) Part of the railroad bed is now utilized as a bicycle/pedestrian recreational trail in the summer and a groomed snowmobile trail in the winter, while a large portion of it is now used by U.S. Route 3.

When the Boston and Maine Railroad bought the line in 1892, they converted the narrow-gauge track to standard gauge. The line ran until 1921, when declining business forced its closing. The station survived for many years, and it was home to the League of New Hampshire Craftsmen until it was demolished when Interstate 93 was constructed. The hotel was practically a self-sufficient community. They operated a large farm with a herd of dairy cows and a large greenhouse. There was a power plant, a boathouse with a steam launch on Echo Lake, dormitories for the help (utilizing the former Lafayette House), a bowling alley, post office, telegraph office, barbershop, billiard hall, music room, souvenir shops, a golf course, and more.

A fish hatchery for raising trout to stock the small trout pond was located within walking distance from the hotel (which today is on the east side of I-93, easily visible from the highway). The hotel owned thousands of acres in Franconia Notch, including the Old Man of the Mountain, Profile Dairy Farm, Profile Links Golf Course, The Basin, The Pool and The Flume. A mineral spring house near the south end of Echo Lake provided water for the guests, and a similar spring still provides water for local residents and visitors. (It is located near Boise Rock.) Recreational facilities included hiking, tennis, badminton, croquet, fishing, boating, horseback and burro riding to the summit of Mount Lafayette and elsewhere.

== Location and attractions ==
Various photographers produced stereoscopic images of the area's scenery. The hotel was greatly expanded over time and included tennis courts, stables, a bowling alley, and cabins. The hotel was located just south of where the Cannon Mountain Aerial Tramway parking lot is now. Boating was enjoyed on nearby Echo Lake and Profile Lake.

== Conclusion ==
After finishing the summer season in 1905, the hotel was razed, reconstructed and reopened in the following year for the 1906 season and later burned to the ground in 1923. Logging companies sought to purchase the property, but thanks to the Society for the Protection of New Hampshire Forests, it was protected and dedicated as Franconia Notch State Park in September 1928.
