= Kearsarge House =

Defunct grand hotel in New Hampshire, US

Coordinates: 44.0499°N 71.1261°W

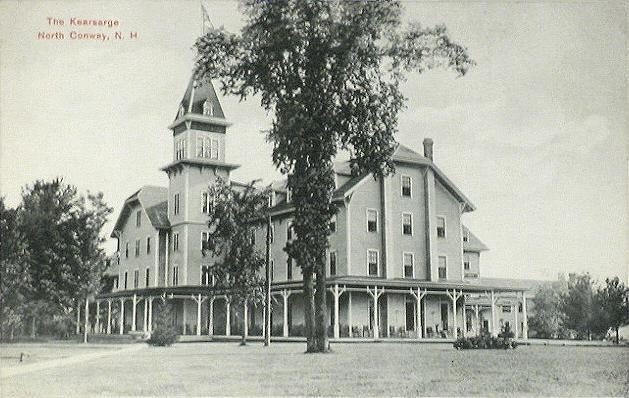
The Kearsarge House c. 1910, an early grand hotel

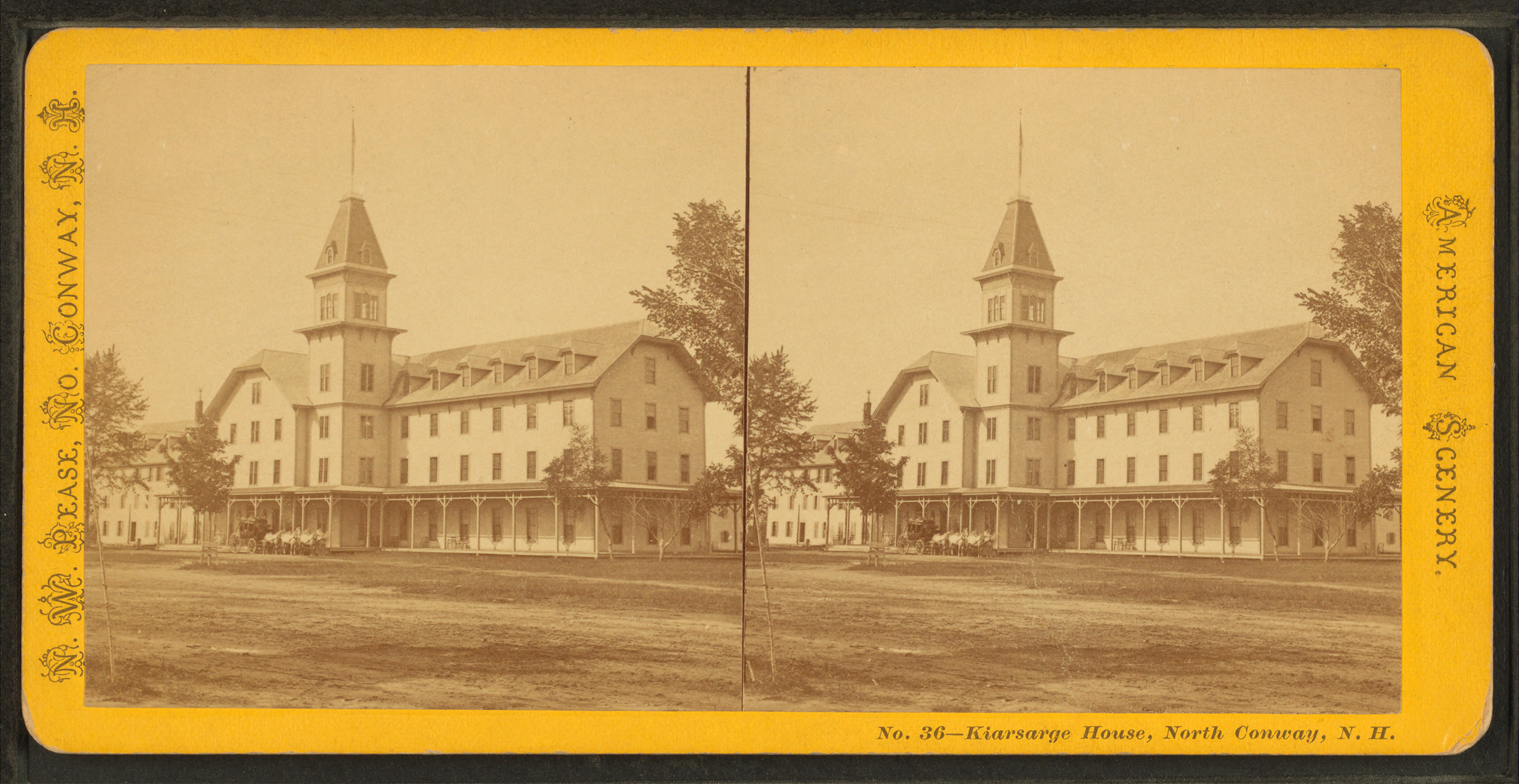
Stereoscopic photograph of Kiarsarge House by North Conway, New Hampshire photographer Nathan W. Pease

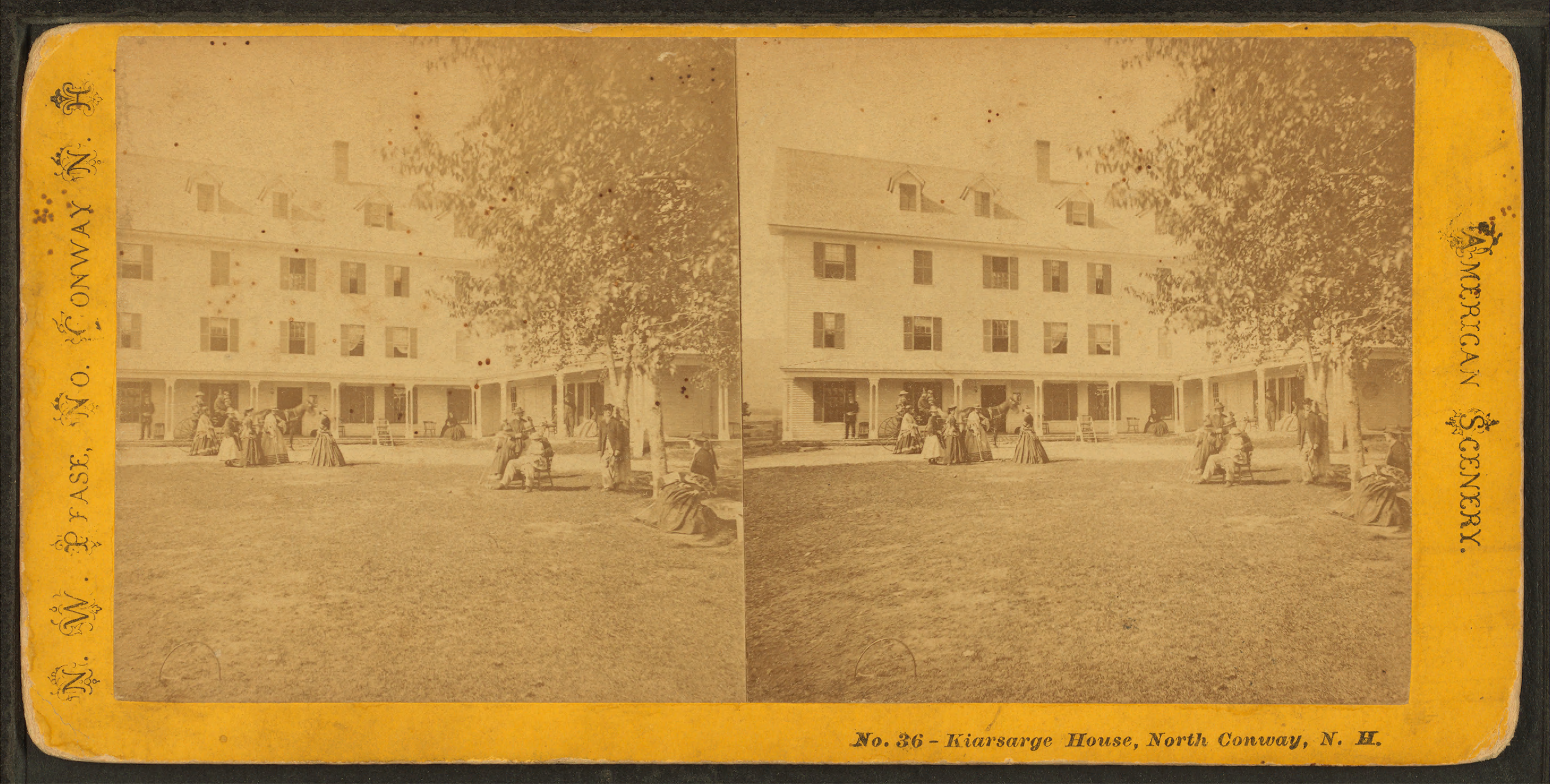
"Kiarsarge House" photographed by Nathan W. Pease

The Kearsarge House (earlier Kiarsarge House) was a grand hotel in North Conway, New Hampshire, United States, from 1872 until it was destroyed by fire on October 18, 1917. Its legacy is continued by the nearby Kearsarge Inn which has a clock from the original hotel. Samuel W. Thompson carried mail to the town and other areas including a route he started to Glen House, another grand hotel in the area, until a rail line was established in the area in 1871. As visitor numbers increased, the hotel was scaled up by Thompson who also acted as a promoter for the area.
