= Echo Lake (Franconia Notch) =

Water body in Grafton County, New Hampshire, United States

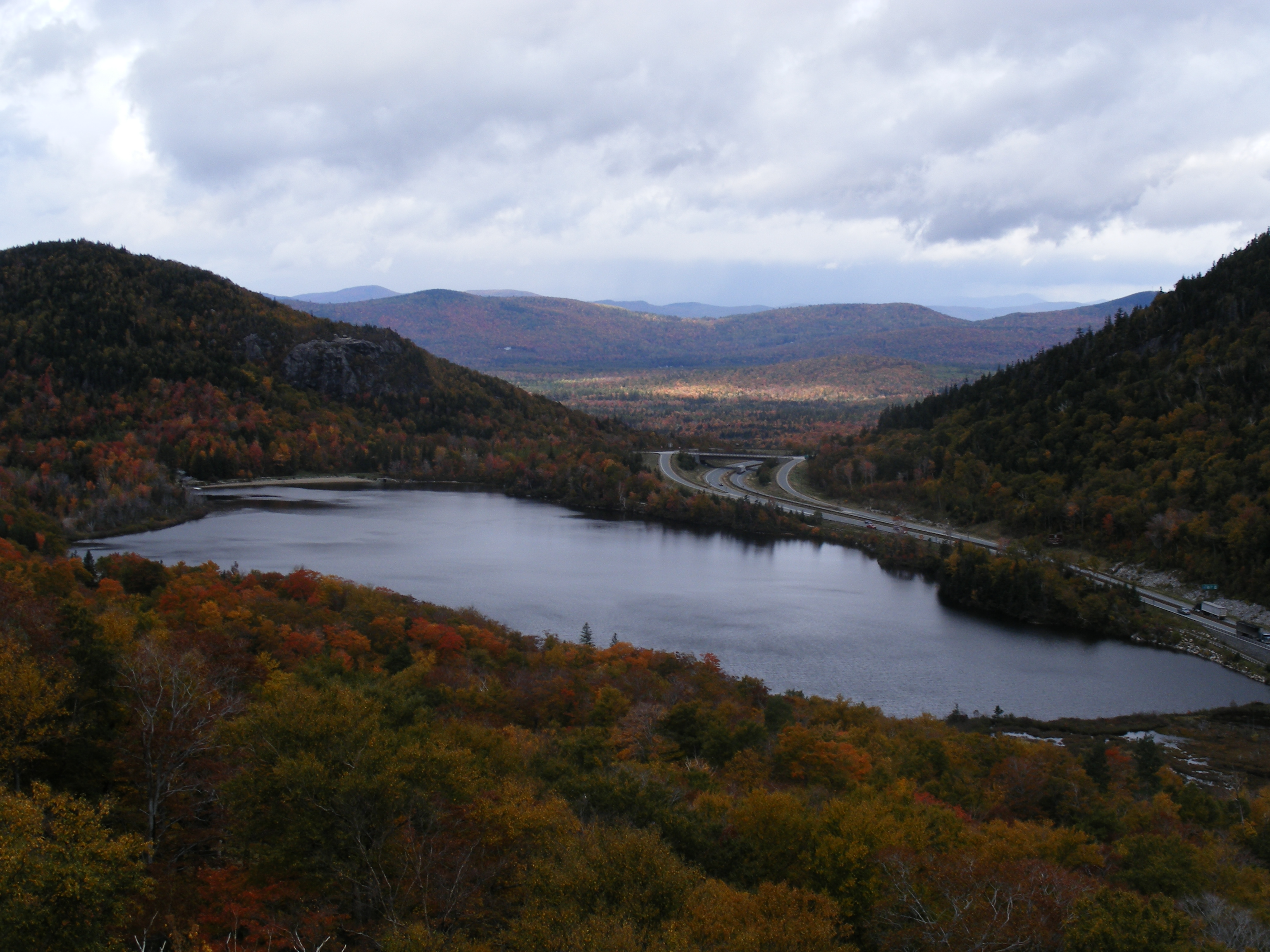
- Echo Lake seen from the Cannon Mountain aerial tramway in October 2008

- Location within New Hampshire Location within the United States
- Location: Grafton County, New Hampshire
- Coordinates: 44°10′31″N 71°41′32″W
- Primary outflows: tributary of Lafayette Brook
- Basin countries: United States
- Max. length: 0.4 mi (0.6 km)
- Max. width: 0.2 mi (0.3 km)
- Surface area: 38.2 acres (15.5 ha)
- Average depth: 14 ft (4.3 m)
- Max. depth: 39 ft (12 m)
- Surface elevation: 1,930 ft (588 m)
- Settlements: Cannon Mountain Ski Area

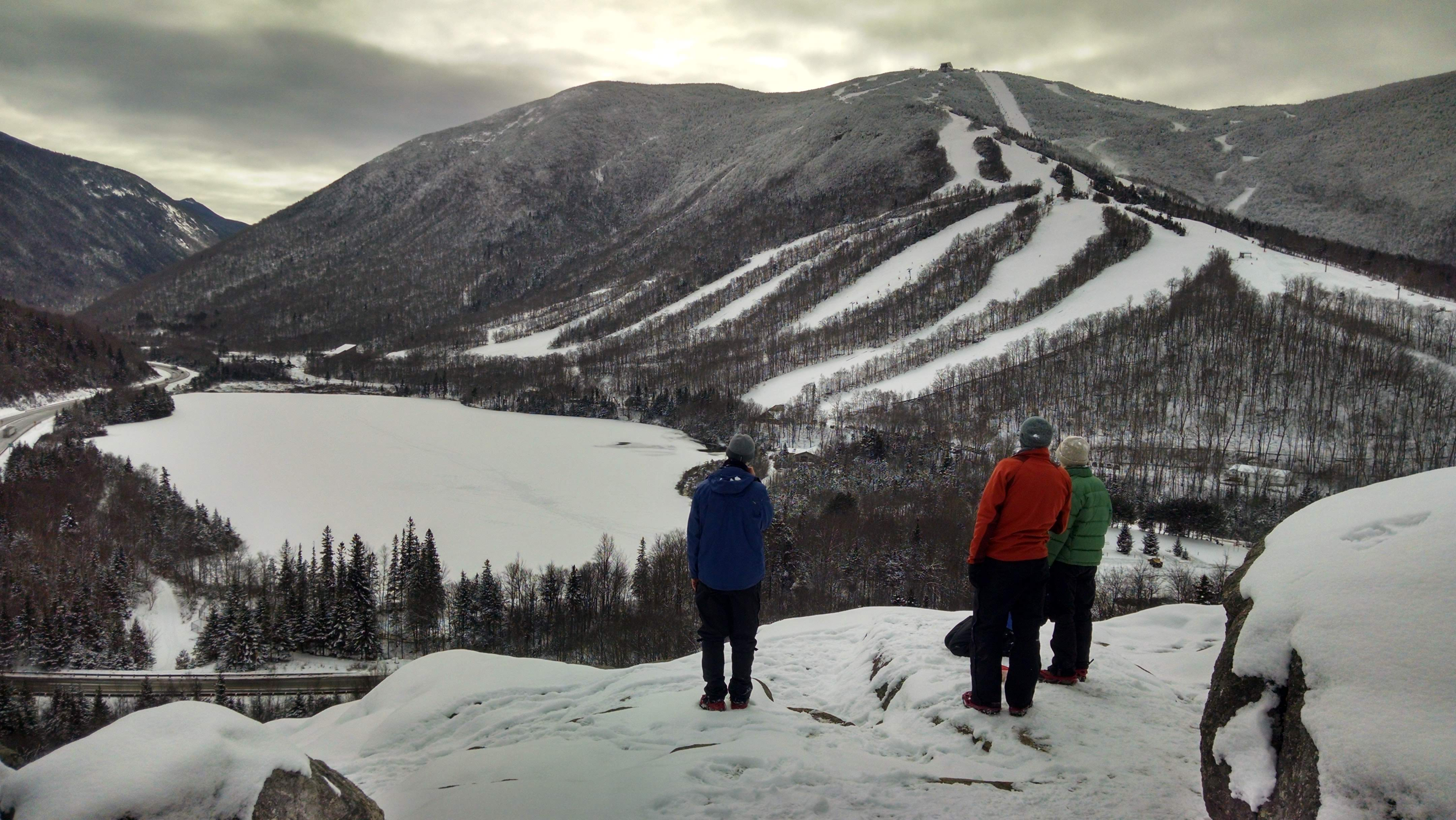
Echo Lake and Cannon Mountain Ski Area seen from Artists Bluff, December 2018

Echo Lake is a 38.2-acre (15.5 ha) water body located in Franconia Notch in the White Mountains of the U.S state of New Hampshire, at the foot of Cannon Mountain. The lake is in the Connecticut River watershed, near the height of land in Franconia Notch; water from the lake's outlet flows north via Lafayette Brook to the Gale River, then the Ammonoosuc River, and finally the Connecticut River to Long Island Sound, an arm of the Atlantic Ocean.

Echo Lake lies in Franconia Notch State Park. The park's Cannon Mountain ski slopes rise directly to the southwest of the lake. Interstate 93 (the Franconia Notch Parkway) runs along the lake's eastern shore, and New Hampshire Route 18 passes the lake's northern shore, where a state park swimming beach is located. Artists Bluff, a hill with open ledges, rises north of the lake and provides views south over the lake into the center of Franconia Notch.

The lake is classified as a coldwater fishery, with observed species including brook trout.

Echo Lake is called Drown Pond in a 1796 map and was listed as 25 acres, located in the 12th lots in the 8th and 9th ranges in Franconia. A deed to Moses Howland from Alexander Jesseman in 1866 refer to the junction of the Gale River and Pond Brook.

== See also ==
- List of lakes in New Hampshire
- Profile Lake
- Profile House, a grand hotel whose guests boated on the lake
