= Nathan W. Pease =

American photographer

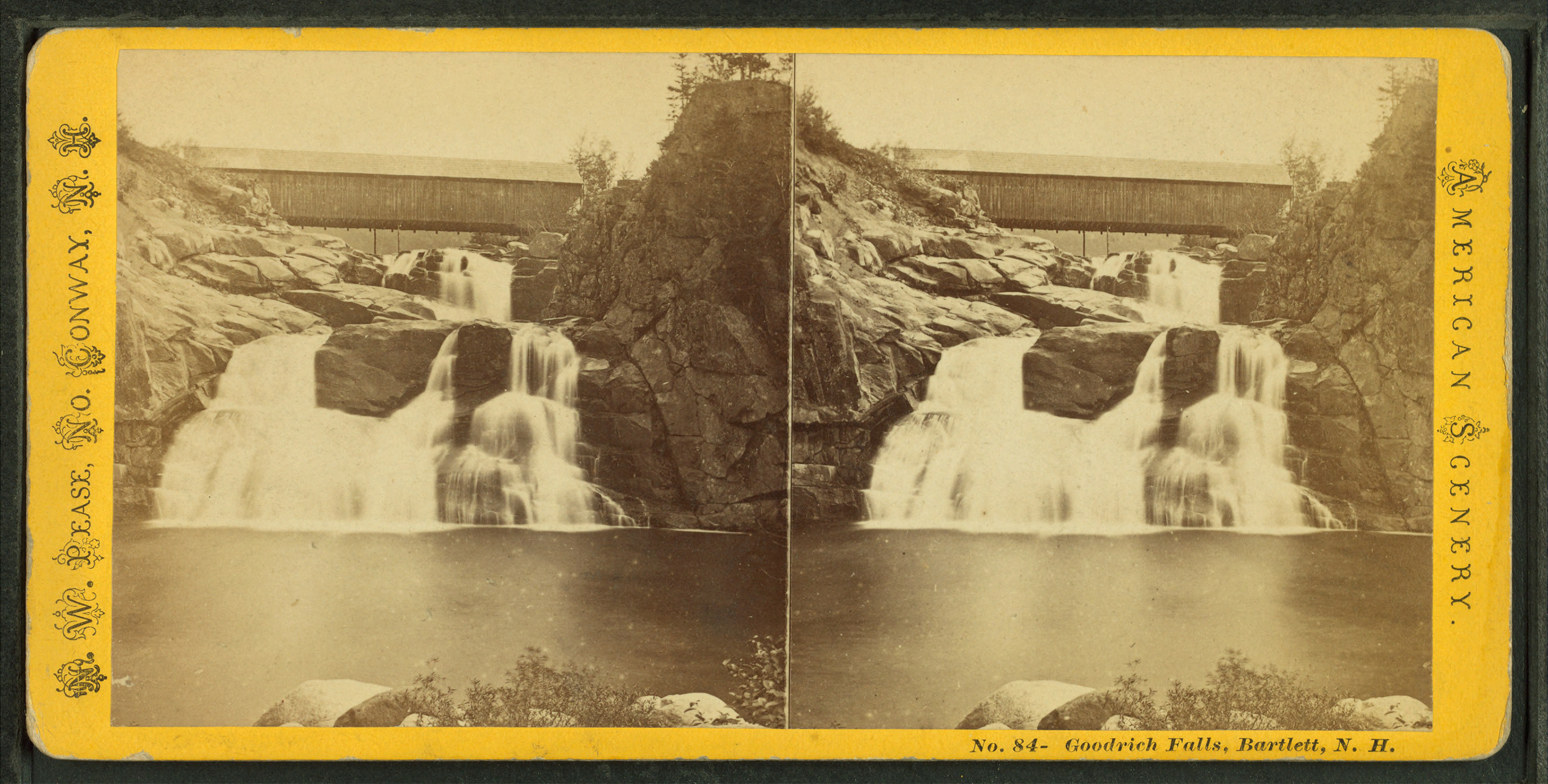
Goodrich Falls in Bartlett, New Hampshire.

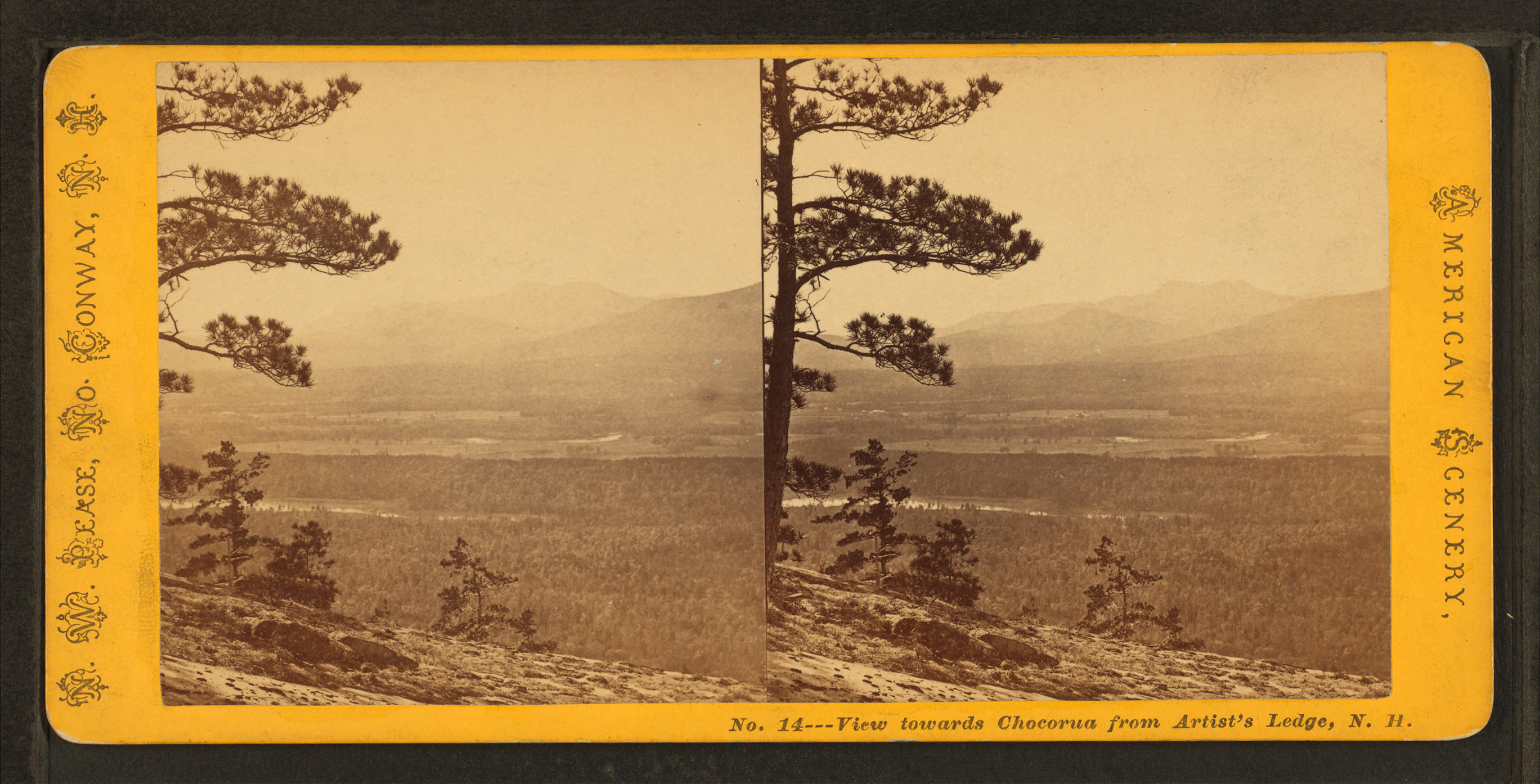
View towards Mount Chocorua from Artist's Ledge, New Hampshire

Nathan W. Pease (1836–1918) was an American photographer in North Conway, New Hampshire, United States.

== Works ==
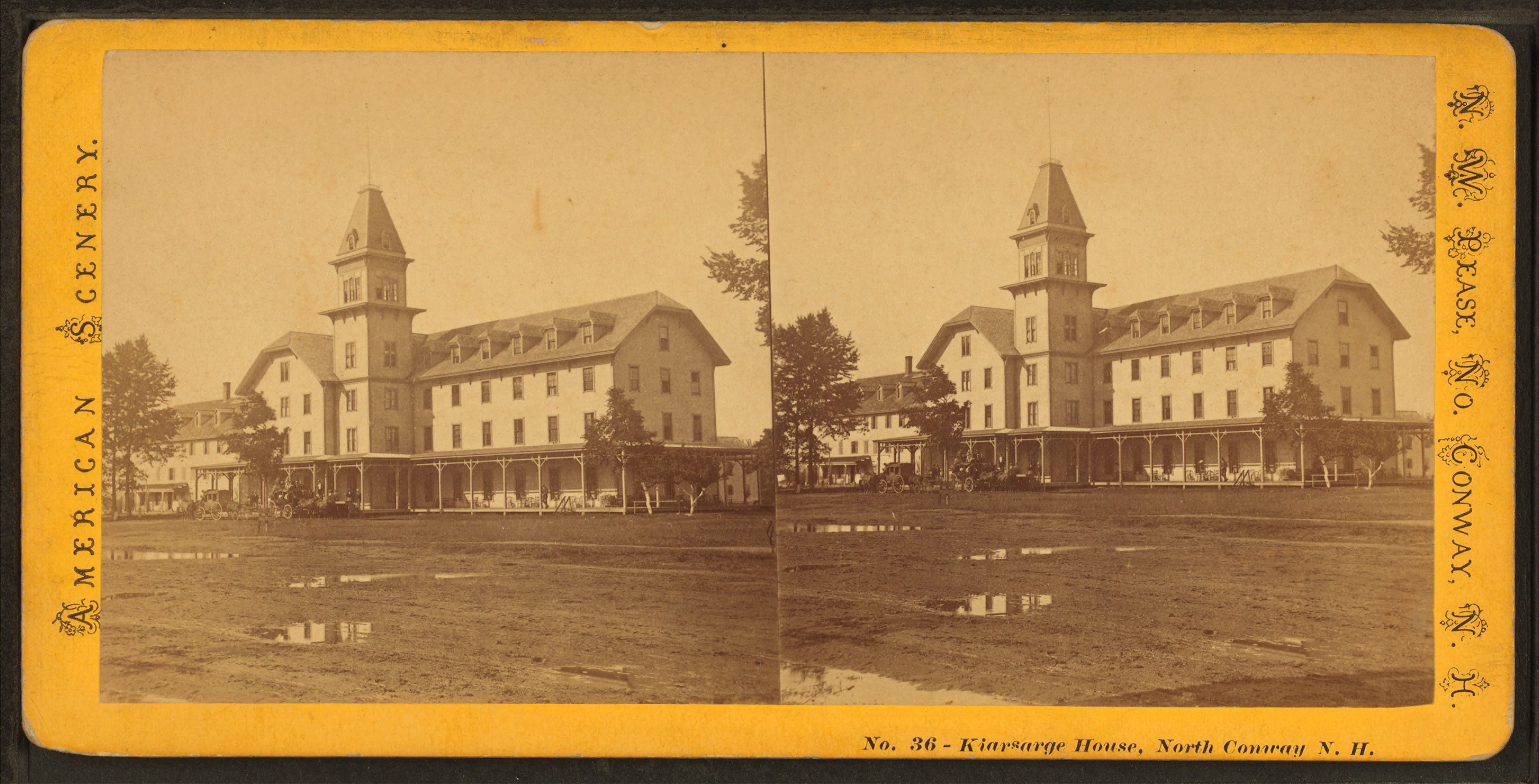
Kearsarge House in North Conway, New Hampshire

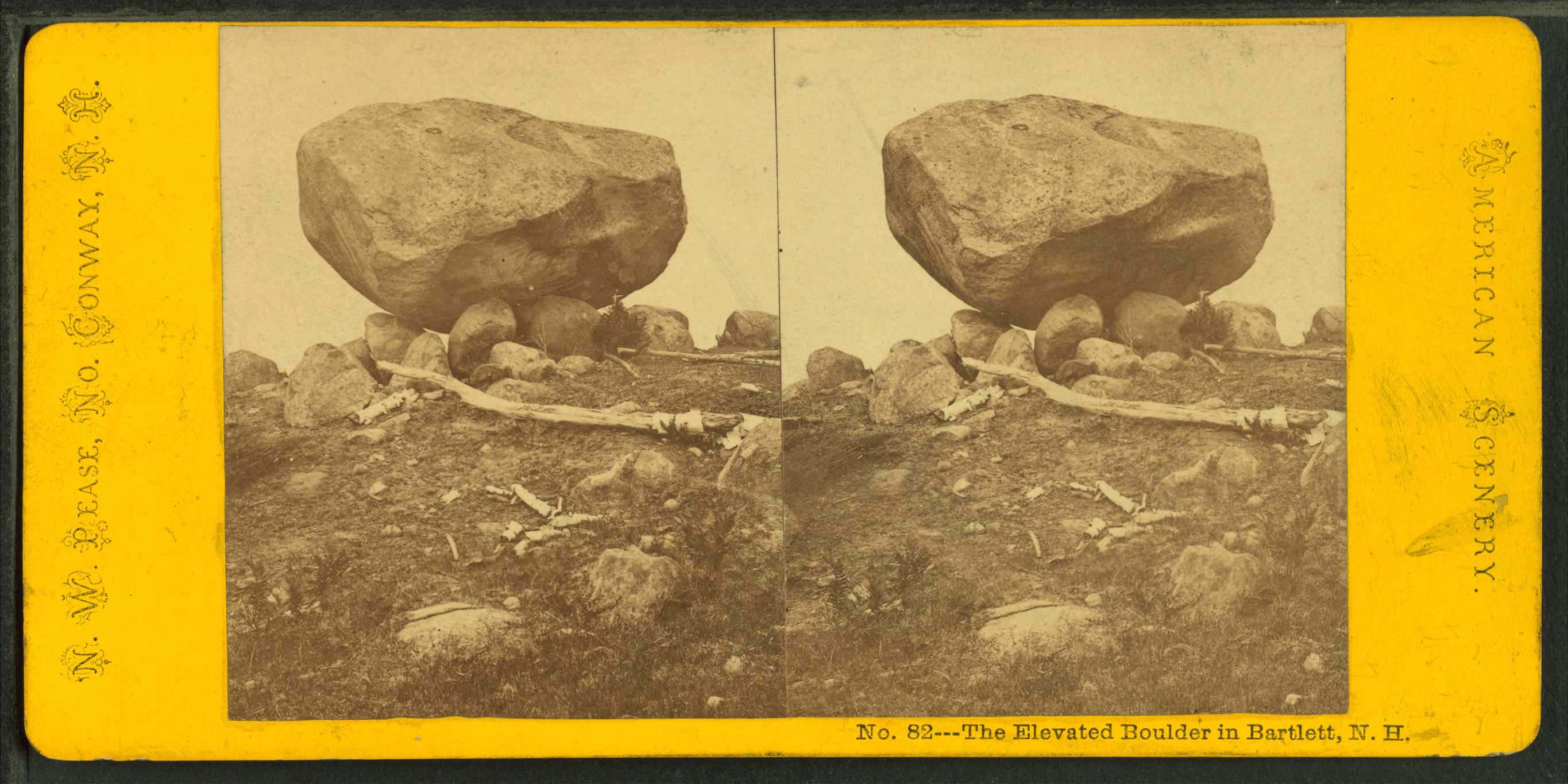
Elevated Boulder in Bartlett, New Hampshire.

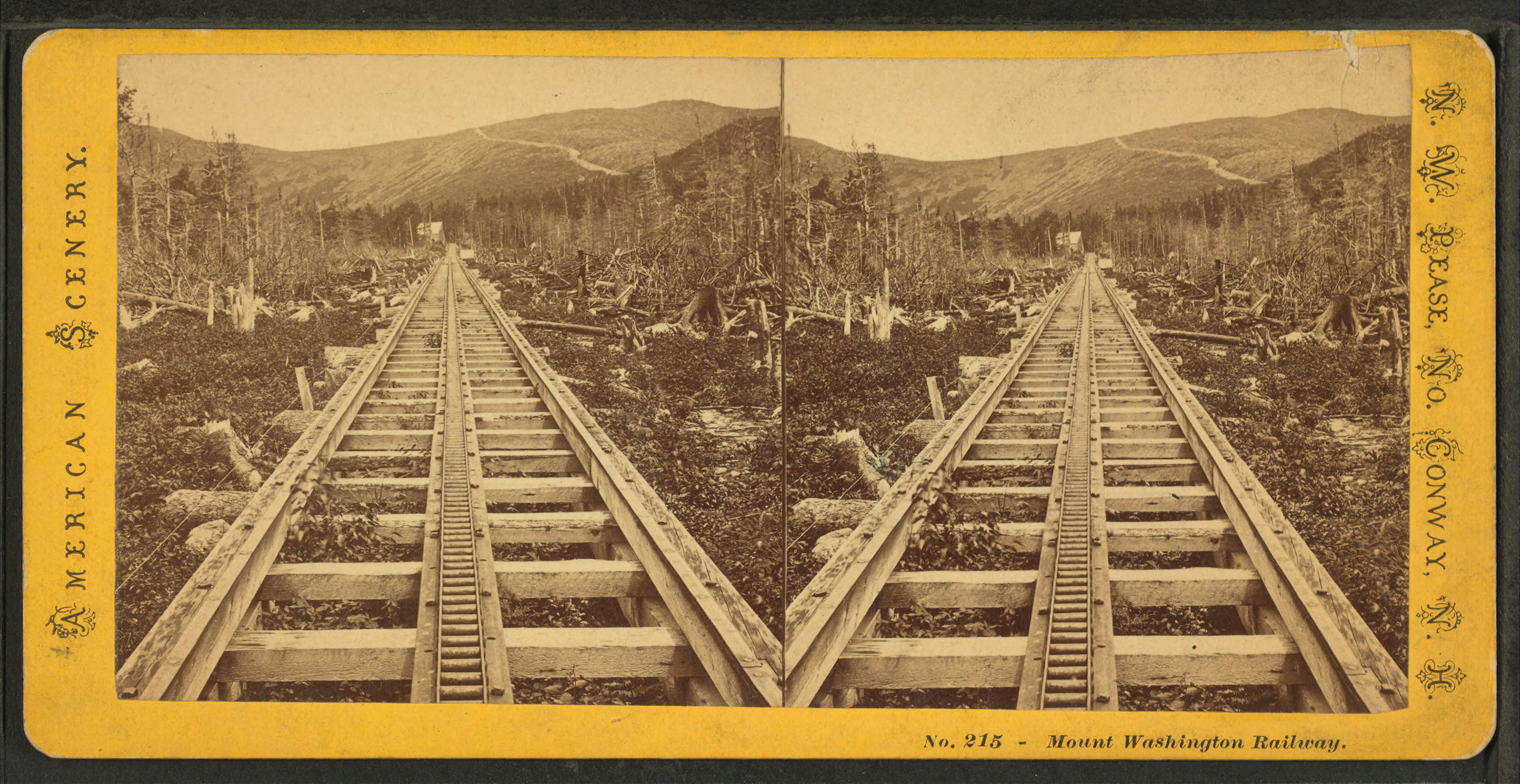
Mount Washington cog railway.

He produced many dozens of stereoscopic images with scenes from his home state. He also produced one of a full moon. In 1870 he published a series documenting the landscape of the White Mountains of New Hampshire.

He was one of many photographers to work in the area of Glen House and Mount Washington.

The White Mountain School of painters were also active in the area.
