= Interstate 93 =

Interstate Highway in Massachusetts, New Hampshire, and Vermont in the United States

Interstate 93
- I-93 highlighted in red

Route information
- Length: 189.95 mi (305.69 km)
- Existed: August 14, 1957–present
- NHS: Entire route
- Restrictions: No hazardous goods and cargo tankers between exits 15B and 18 in Massachusetts

Major junctions
- South end: I-95 / US 1 / Route 128 in Canton, MA
- Route 24 in Randolph, MA; Route 3 in Braintree, MA; I-90 / Mass Pike in Boston, MA; US 1 in Boston, MA; I-95 / Route 128 in Reading, MA; I-293 / NH 101 in Manchester, NH; US 3 in Hooksett, NH; I-89 in Bow, NH; US 4 in Canterbury, NH; US 2 in Waterford, VT
- North end: I-91 in Waterford, VT

Location
- Country: United States
- States: Massachusetts, New Hampshire, Vermont
- Counties: MA: Norfolk, Suffolk, Middlesex, Essex; NH: Rockingham, Hillsborough, Merrimack, Belknap, Grafton; VT: Caledonia

Highway system
- Interstate Highway System; Main; Auxiliary; Suffixed; Business; Future
- Massachusetts State Highway System; Interstate; US; State
- New Hampshire Highway System; Interstate; US; State; Turnpikes
- State highways in Vermont
← I-91	MA	→ I-95
← I-89	NH	→ I-95
← I-91	VT	→ VT 100

Interstate 93 (I-93) is an Interstate Highway in the New England states of Massachusetts, New Hampshire, and Vermont in the United States. Spanning approximately 190 miles (310 km) along a north–south axis, it is one of three primary Interstate Highways located entirely within New England; the other two are I-89 and I-91. The largest cities along the route are Boston, and Manchester, New Hampshire; it also travels through the New Hampshire state capital of Concord.

I-93 begins at an interchange with I-95, US Route 1 (US 1) and Route 128 in Canton, Massachusetts. It travels concurrently with US 1, before Route 3 joins the concurrency at the Braintree Split on the Braintree–Quincy city line. The three routes travel via the Central Artery into and through Downtown Boston, splitting off from each other after crossing over the Charles River on the Leonard P. Zakim Bunker Hill Memorial Bridge. The portion of highway between the Braintree Split and the Central Artery is named the "Southeast Expressway", while the portion from Boston to the New Hampshire state line is named the "Northern Expressway".

I-93 ends in St. Johnsbury, Vermont, at I-91. For most of its length, I-93 indirectly parallels US 3. In New Hampshire, the two highways have several interchanges with each other, as well as a concurrency through Franconia Notch State Park.

== Route description ==
Lengths
	mi	km
MA	47.07	75.75
NH	131.78	212.08
VT	11.10	17.86
Total	189.95	305.69

=== Massachusetts ===
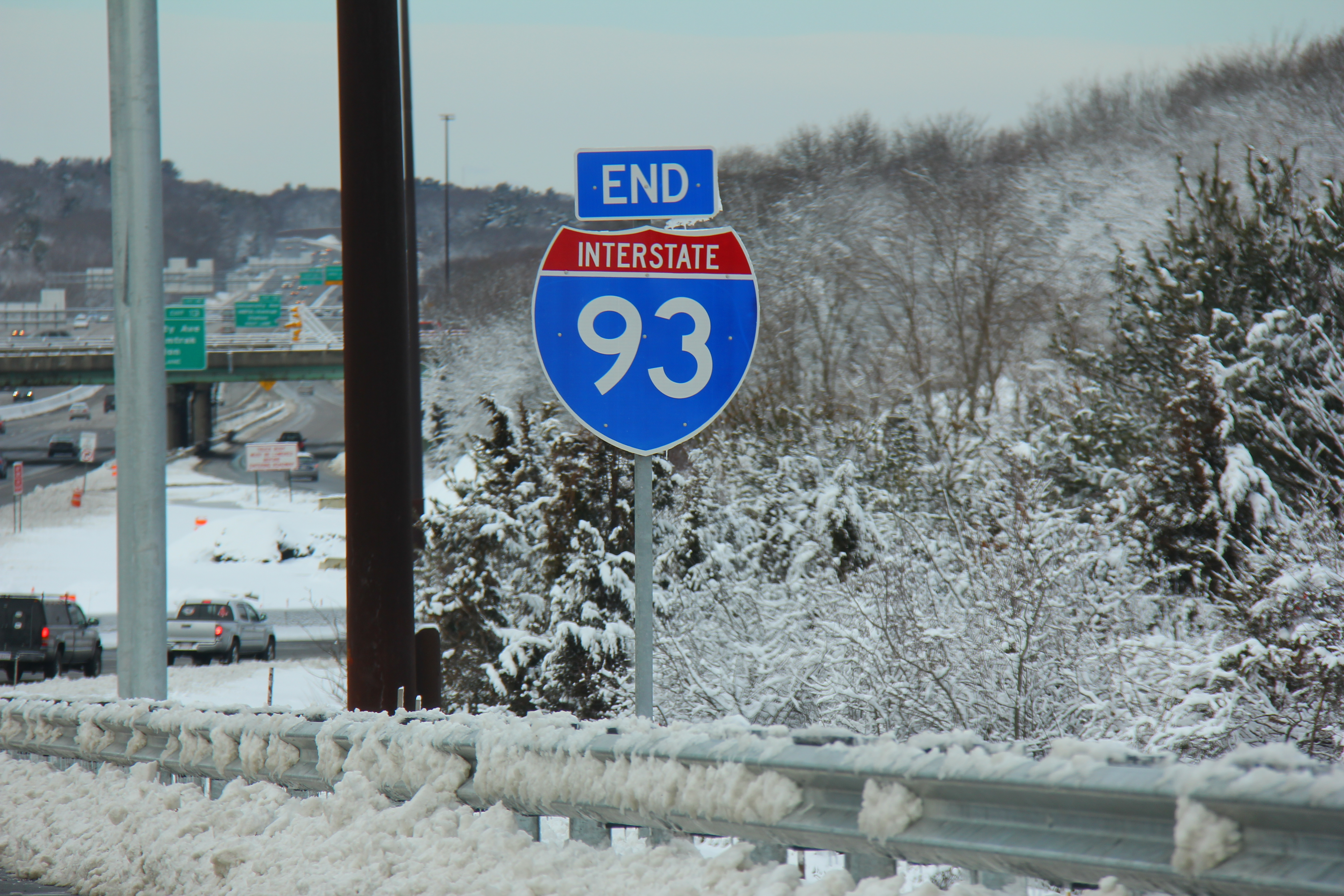
Southern terminus of I-93 at I-95 in Canton, Massachusetts

I-93's southern terminus is at exit 26 (formerly exit 12) of I-95 in Canton, cosigned with US 1 north. At this junction, I-95 north heads to the northwest (cosigned with US 1 south, as well as Route 128, which begins at the interchange), to serve as the beltway around Boston, while I-95 south runs by itself southwest through Boston's southwestern suburbs toward Rhode Island. The southernmost three miles (4.8 km) of I-93 run east through Boston's southern suburbs, passing through Canton and Randolph. In Randolph, I-93 meets the northern end of Route 24 (Fall River Expressway/AMVETS Memorial Highway) at exit 4. I-93 continues east into Braintree, interchanging with Route 3, the major freeway linking Boston to Cape Cod, at exit 7 (known locally as the "Braintree Split"). Route 3 north joins I-93 and US 1, and the highway turns north toward Boston. These first seven miles (11 km) of I-93 follow what was formerly part of Route 128 before it was truncated at the I-95/I-93 junction.

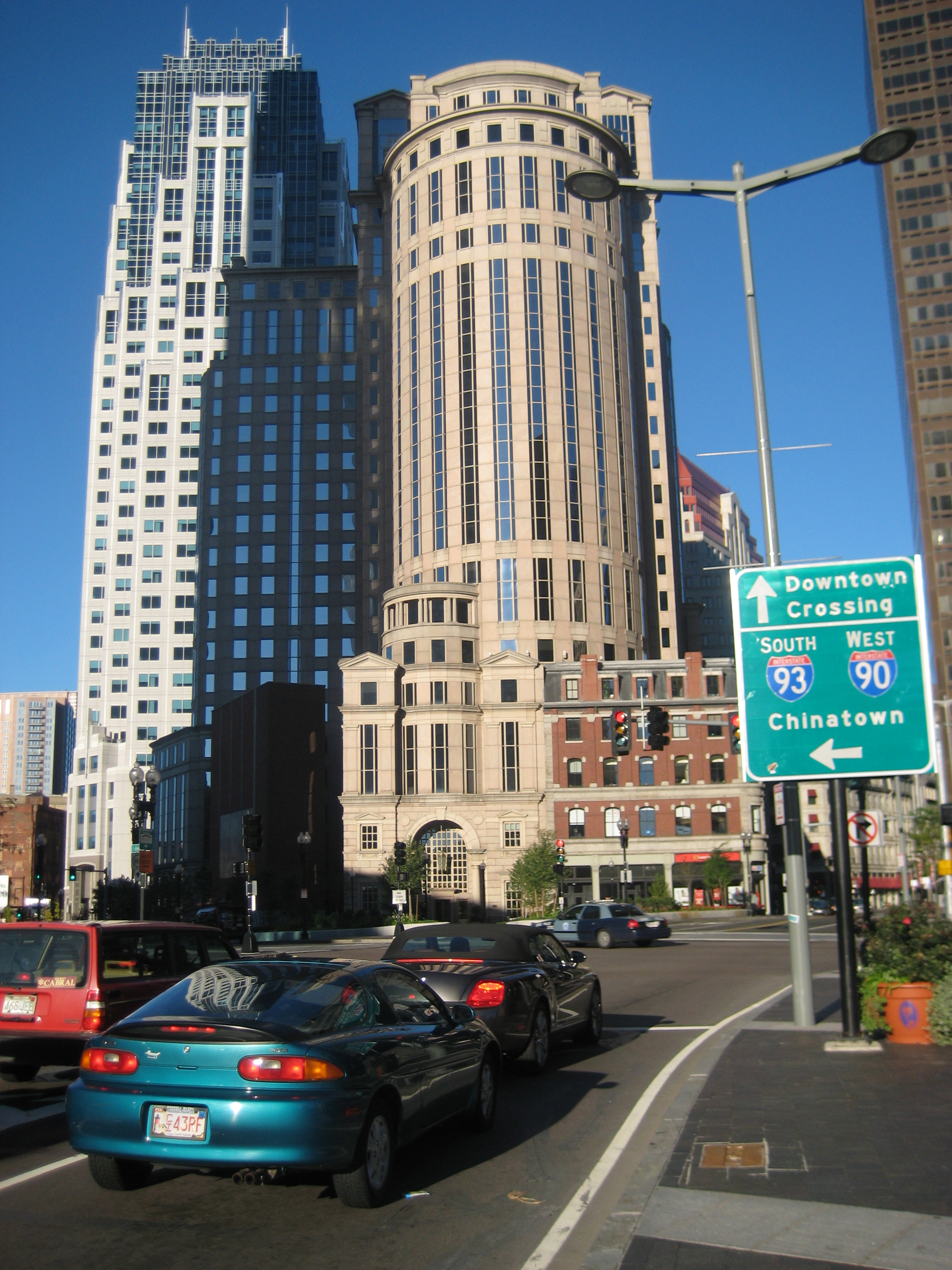
Signs in the Financial District of Boston pointing toward Downtown Crossing, Chinatown, I-93, and I-90

Upon turning northward, the highway is known as the Southeast Expressway, passing through Quincy and Milton before crossing into the city of Boston over the Neponset River. After the Massachusetts Avenue connector exit, the highway officially becomes the John F. Fitzgerald Expressway, also known as the Central Artery, and passes beneath Downtown Boston. A major intersection with the Massachusetts Turnpike/I-90 (exit 16, formerly 20) takes place just south of Downtown Boston. After the massive interchange, motorists use the O'Neill Tunnel to travel underneath the city and then use the Leonard P. Zakim Bunker Hill Memorial Bridge to cross the Charles River. Two exits are located in the tunnel, where the speed limit is 45 mph (72 km/h). Route 3 leaves the Artery just before the Zakim bridge via exit 18 (formerly 26), and US 1 leaves the Artery just after the bridge, via exit 19 (formerly 27) (no southbound access). From Boston through the rest of Massachusetts, Concord, New Hampshire, appears as the control city on northbound overhead signs. The Artery ends as I-93 continues north out of the city.

I-93 continues through the northern suburbs of Boston, coming to a second interchange with I-95 and Route 128, which run concurrently. Travelers going north can either change over to I-95 north to eventually reach Maine or remain on I-93 toward New Hampshire. Farther north, in Andover, I-93 meets I-495, providing access to Worcester to the southwest and New Hampshire's Seacoast Region to the northeast. Just south of the state line, I-93 crosses the Merrimack River into Methuen, where it intersects Route 110 and Route 113 at exit 43 (formerly 46) just north of the river crossing. Between 2014 and 2018, the Route 110/Route 113 junction beneath I-93 was converted from a rotary to a partial cloverleaf, with the new traffic patterns opening in various stages during 2016 and 2017. On I-93 northbound, the exit was split into 43A (formerly 46A) for Route 110 and Route 113 eastbound, and 43B (formerly 46B) for Route 110 and Route 113 westbound. I-93 then interchanges with the western end of Route 213, a connector between I-93 and I-495. I-93 then crosses into New Hampshire after about one mile (1.6 km).

In all, I-93 has 46 (formerly 48) numbered exits in Massachusetts, although, before the mileage-based exit numbering system was implemented in 2021, several numbers were skipped in and near Boston. Several exits were removed from I-93 to address traffic problems in addition to converting the Central Artery from 6 to 8 to 10 lanes, by reducing the combined number of on- and offramps from 27 to 14. Exit 46 (formerly 48) in Methuen, just before the New Hampshire state line, is the highest-numbered exit along the entire route. I-93 once had only 22 exits prior to the rerouting of I-95 onto Route 128. Nearly the entire length of I-93 in Massachusetts carries four lanes in each direction. Average daily traffic volumes on I-93 in the state range from 100,000 vehicles at the New Hampshire border and 150,000 vehicles at the southern end at I-95 to over 200,000 vehicles through Braintree and Quincy.

=== New Hampshire ===
I-93 travels just over 131 miles (211 km) in New Hampshire, about two-thirds of the highway's total distance. Serving as the main Interstate route in New Hampshire, it connects the state capital, Concord, and its largest city, Manchester. Beyond Concord are the towns of Tilton, Plymouth, and Littleton. I-93 is designated as the Alan B. Shepard Highway from the Massachusetts line to Hooksett (just north of Manchester at the northern terminus of I-293), as the Everett Turnpike from Hooksett to Concord, and as the Styles Bridges Highway, after the US politician, from Concord to the Vermont line. This section of roadway was constructed between 1961 and 1977.

Between the northern end of I-293 in Hooksett and the beginning of I-89 in Bow, I-93 carries the northern end of the Everett Turnpike. There is one toll booth along this section, at exit 11 in Hooksett; the toll for passenger cars is $1.00 ($0.50 at the ramp toll booth). This is the only toll collected along the entire length of the highway. I-93 in New Hampshire is also notable for having state liquor stores serve as rest areas, which are passed just after the toll plaza, traveling north. There are separate stores on both sides of the Interstate for travelers in each direction.

I-93 enters New Hampshire at Salem. A rest area and welcome center is available on the northbound side of the freeway, directly before exit 1. I-93 is four lanes wide in each direction for its first 18.5 miles (29.8 km), until the split with I-293 and New Hampshire Route 101 (NH 101), where I-93 drops to three lanes before adding a fourth and fifth lane back to the freeway after the interchange. The construction to widen I-93 to four lanes each way between the Massachusetts–New Hampshire border and its junction with I-293 and NH 101 was completed in 2021.

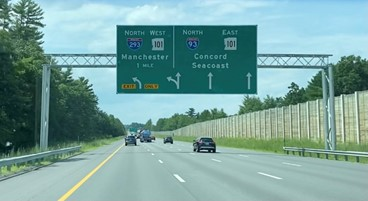
I-93 north approaching its southern interchange with I-293 and NH 101 in Manchester

I-93 and NH 101 run concurrently for about one mile (1.6 km) before NH 101 exits to the east as its own freeway, serving Portsmouth and the Seacoast Region. I-93 maintains three lanes of traffic in each direction until the junction with I-89, where it becomes two lanes in each direction through most of its journey northward, with the only exception being the Franconia Notch section.

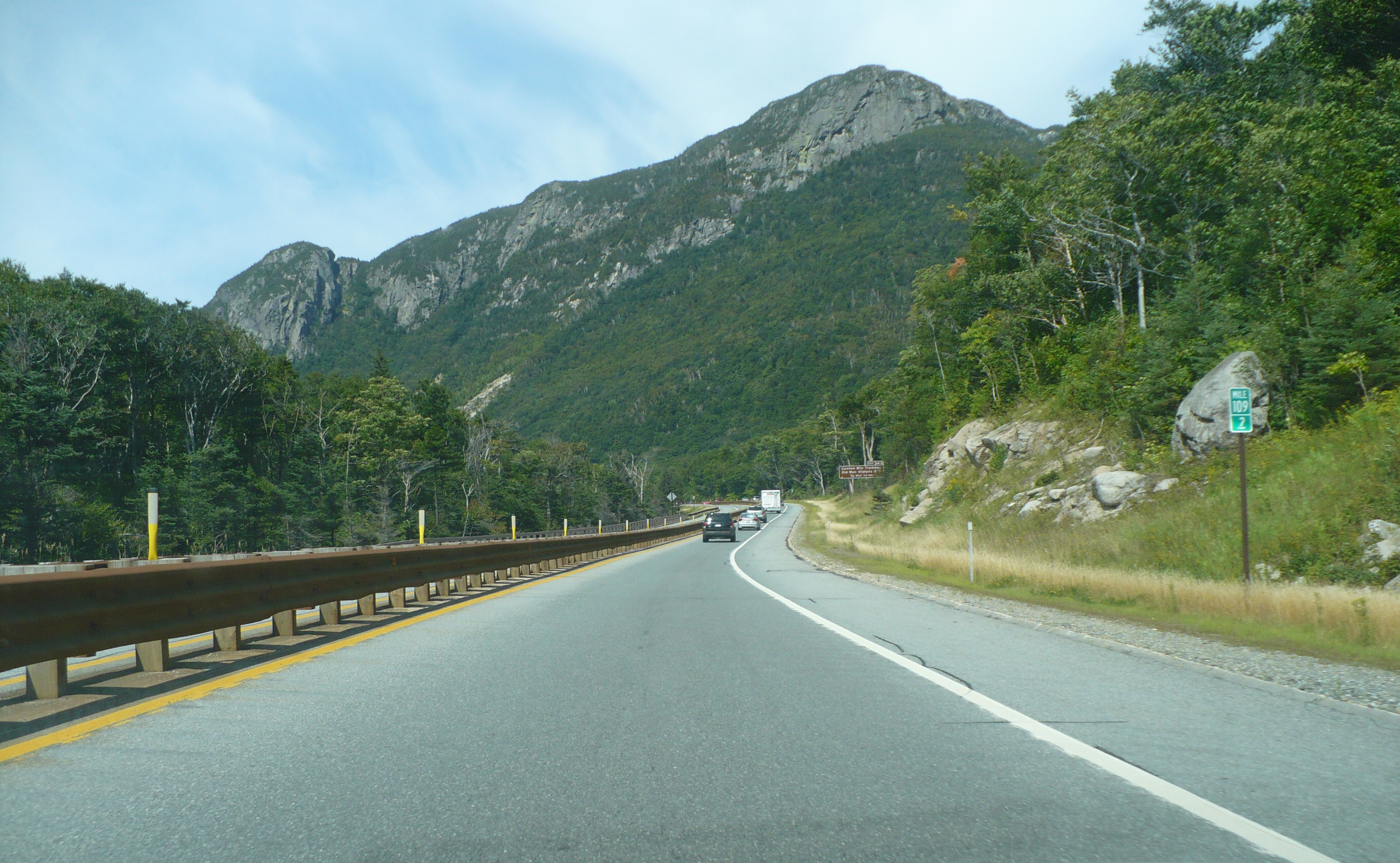
Northbound lane of I-93/US 3 in Franconia Notch

In the state capital of Concord, I-393 heads directly east (cosigned with eastbound US 4 and US 202), providing another route to the Seacoast Region. Westbound US 4 joins I-93 and runs concurrently with it, crossing the Merrimack River again, until exit 17 for Penacook, about five miles (8.0 km) farther north, before exiting westward. Continuing north, I-93 traverses the Lakes Region of New Hampshire and then makes its way north through the heart of the White Mountains Region. I-93 passes through Franconia Notch State Park as a two-lane freeway (one lane in each direction) with a 45-mile-per-hour (72 km/h) speed limit, designed to reduce I-93's impact on Franconia Notch. For the trip through Franconia Notch, I-93 and US 3 run concurrently.

Beyond Franconia Notch State Park, US 3 heads northeastward through the Great North Woods Region, while I-93 runs to the northwest. The final town along I-93 in New Hampshire is Littleton, served by four exits. Many motorist services are available at exit 42. After passing through town, it crosses the Connecticut River into Vermont. The last exit along I-93 is exit 44 for Monroe, through which a rest area and welcome center is accessible to travelers from both sides of the highway.

In 2013, a bill was signed by governor Maggie Hassan to raise the speed limit on I-93 to 70 mph (110 km/h) from milemarker 45 to the Vermont border, with the exception of the Franconia Notch Parkway. The new limit took effect on January 1, 2014.

=== Vermont ===
I-93 runs for 11 miles (18 km) in Vermont, with one numbered exit in the state before ending at the interchange with I-91 in St. Johnsbury in the Northeast Kingdom of Vermont. A rest area and welcome center is located along the northbound side of the highway for travelers entering from New Hampshire. The final three miles (4.8 km) of the Interstate actually veer to the southwest while traveling northbound. Vehicles bound for Canada can use northbound I-91 to reach the Derby Line–Stanstead Border Crossing at that Interstate's end, and northwards into Canada as an autoroute freeway into the Canadian province of Quebec. The portion of I-93 in Vermont parallels both US 2 and Vermont Route 18 (VT 18).

== History ==
=== Southeast Expressway ===
The Southeast Expressway was constructed between 1954 and 1959, at the same time the John F. Fitzgerald Expressway (Central Artery) was built. Its northern terminus is at exit 15 (southbound) or 15B (northbound) (former exit 18; Frontage Road) in South Boston, a former Y interchange where the canceled Southwest Corridor/I-95 was to meet with I-93 and run concurrent northward into downtown. The southern terminus is at the Y interchange (the "Braintree Split") at exit 7 in Braintree (the former southern terminus of Route 128). A section of the expressway, beginning south of the Savin Hill overpass and ending just before the Braintree Split, utilizes a zipper lane, in which a movable barrier carves out a reversible high-occupancy vehicle lane (HOV lane) on the non-peak side of the highway during rush hour. Most of the right of way for the Granite Railway in Milton and Quincy was incorporated into the expressway.

On August 21, 1969, a train of three runaway locomotives burst out of what is now Cabot Yard, across Frontage Road, and blocked the northbound side of the highway.

=== Boston ===
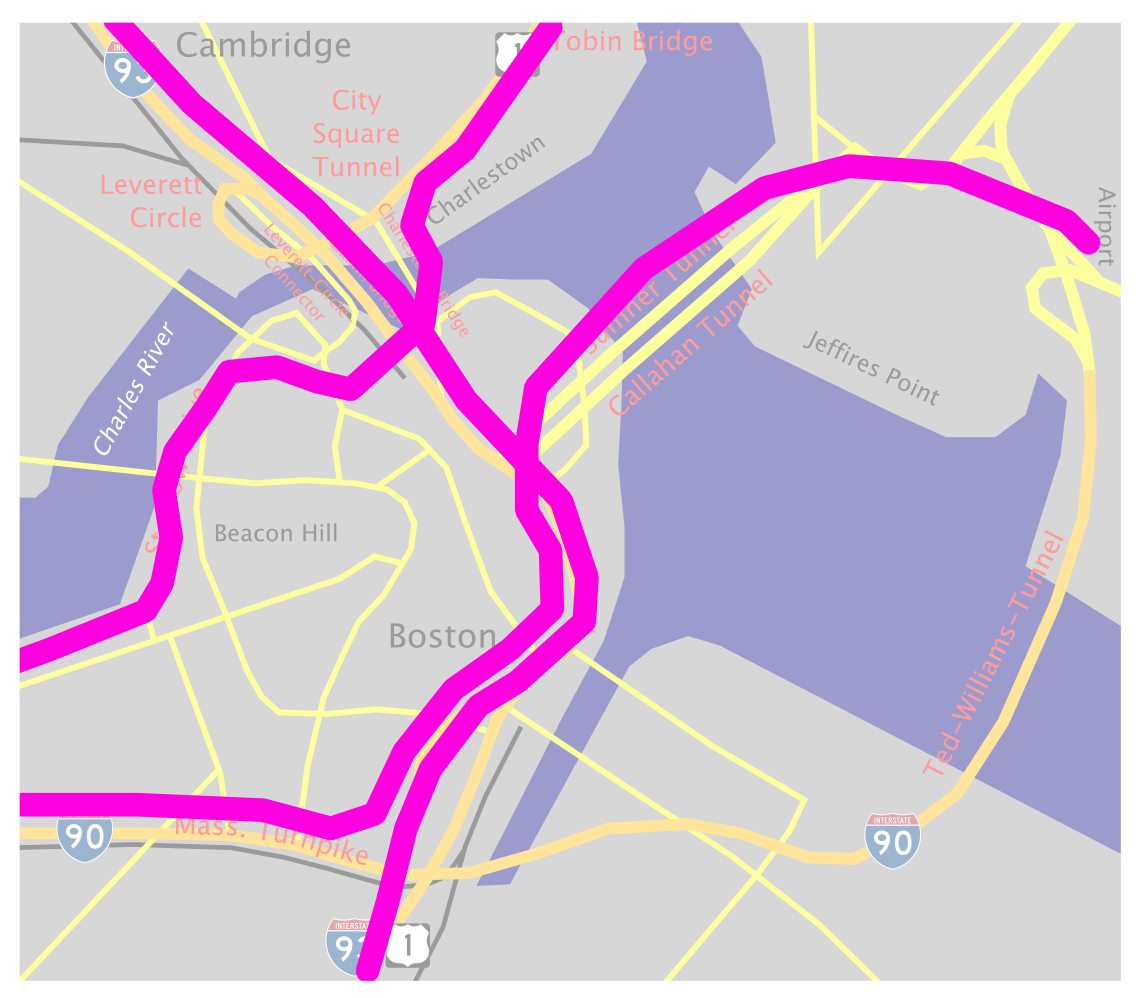
Route of the original Central Artery, as well as other roadways affected by the Big Dig

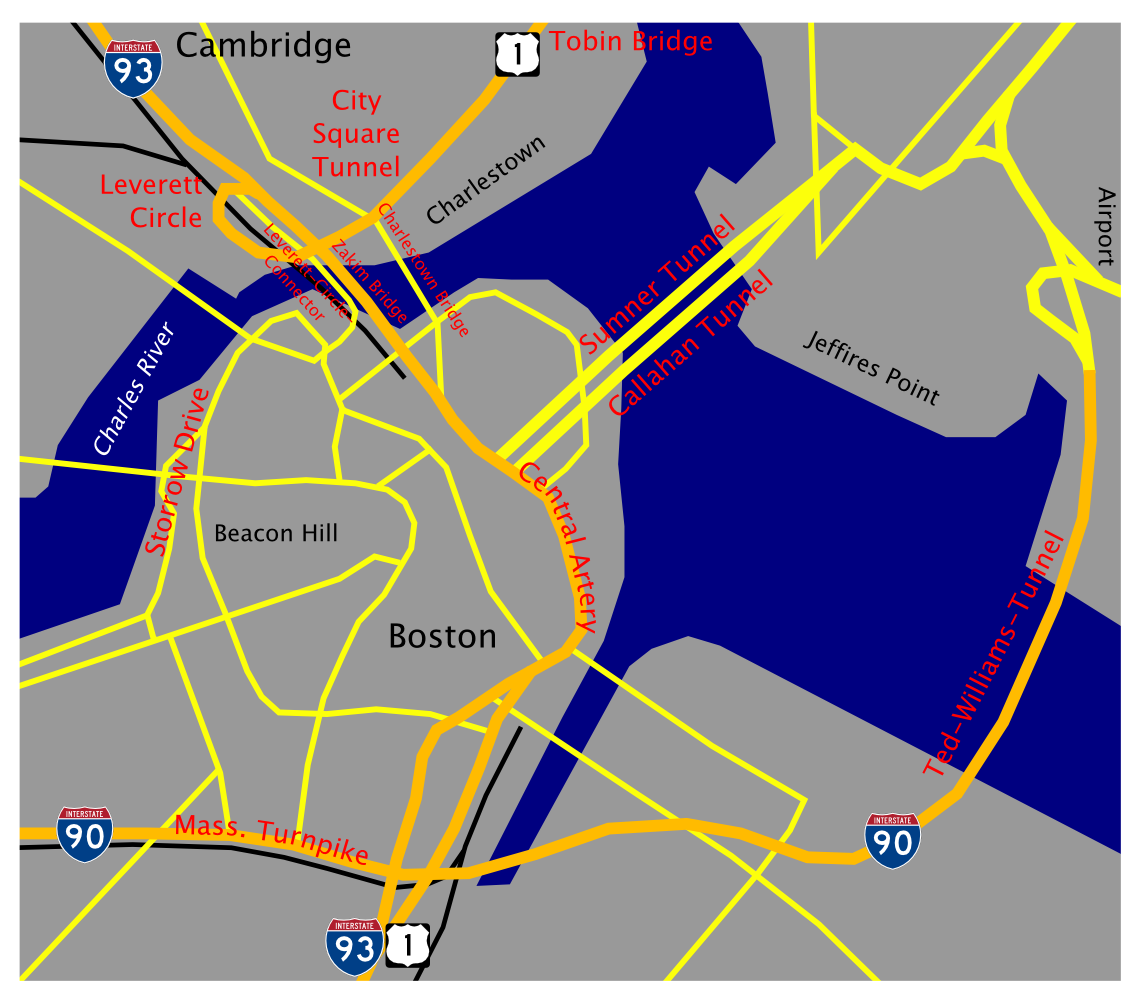
Route of the new Central Artery after the Big Dig

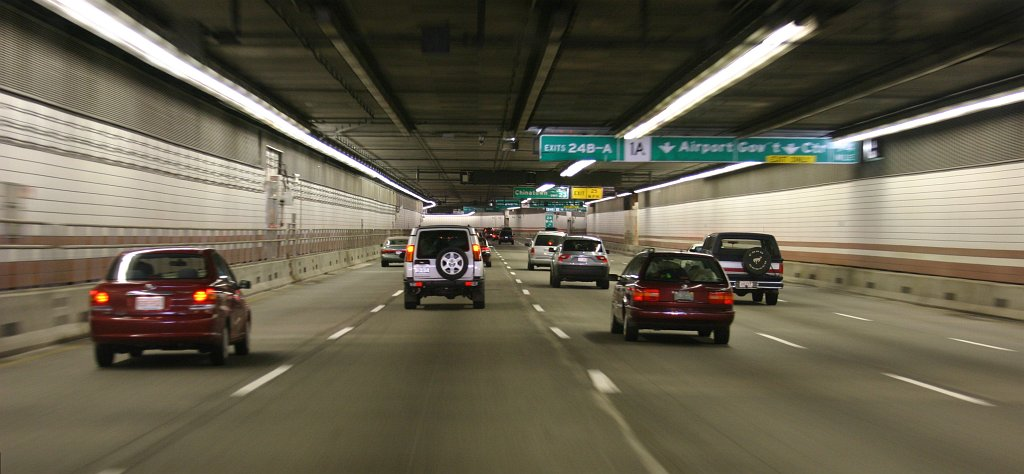
I-93 through the O'Neill Tunnel

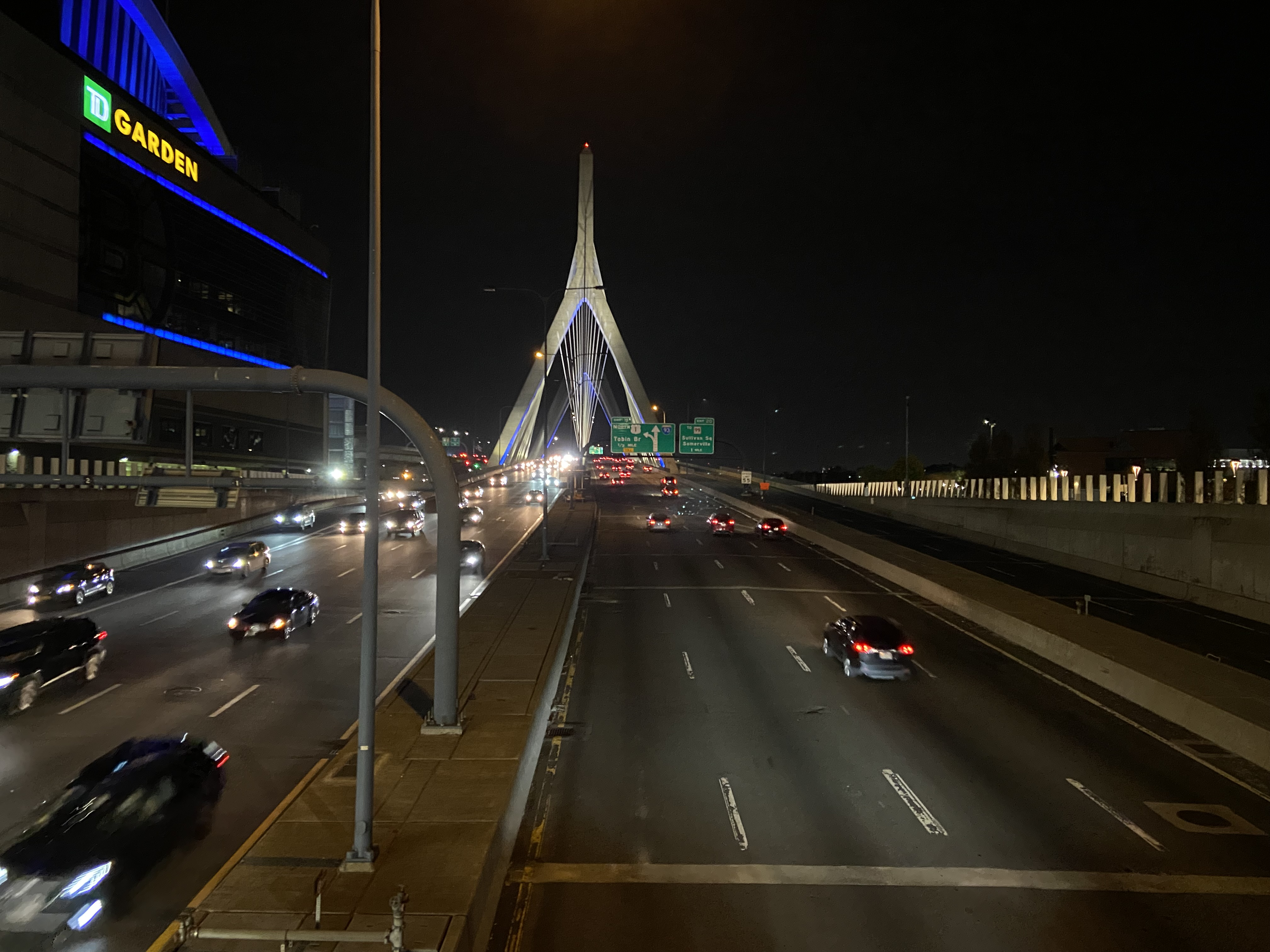
I-93 passing by TD Garden as it travels on the Zakim Bridge

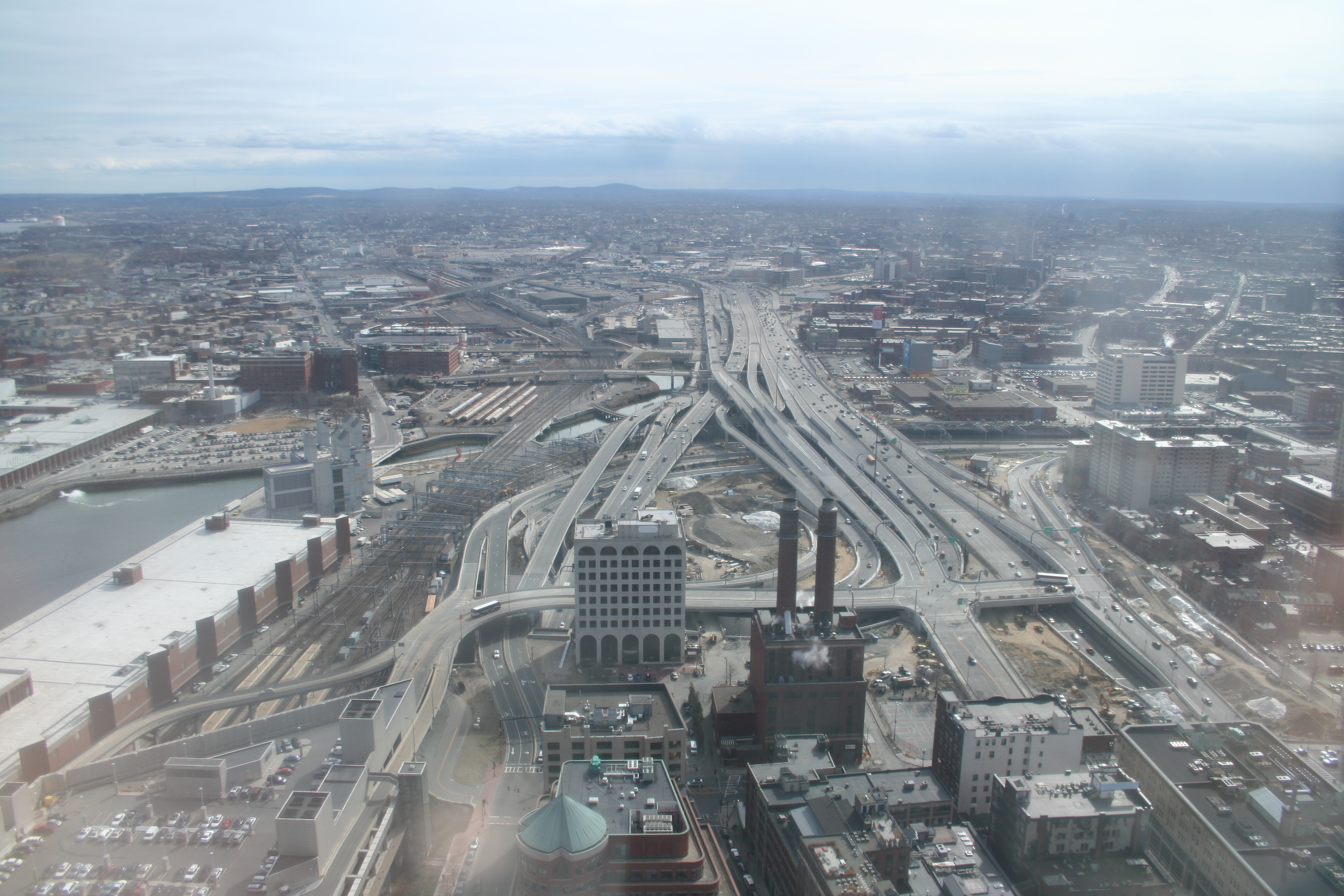
The South Bay Interchange (looking south) to the Southeast Expressway with Great Blue Hill visible in the background

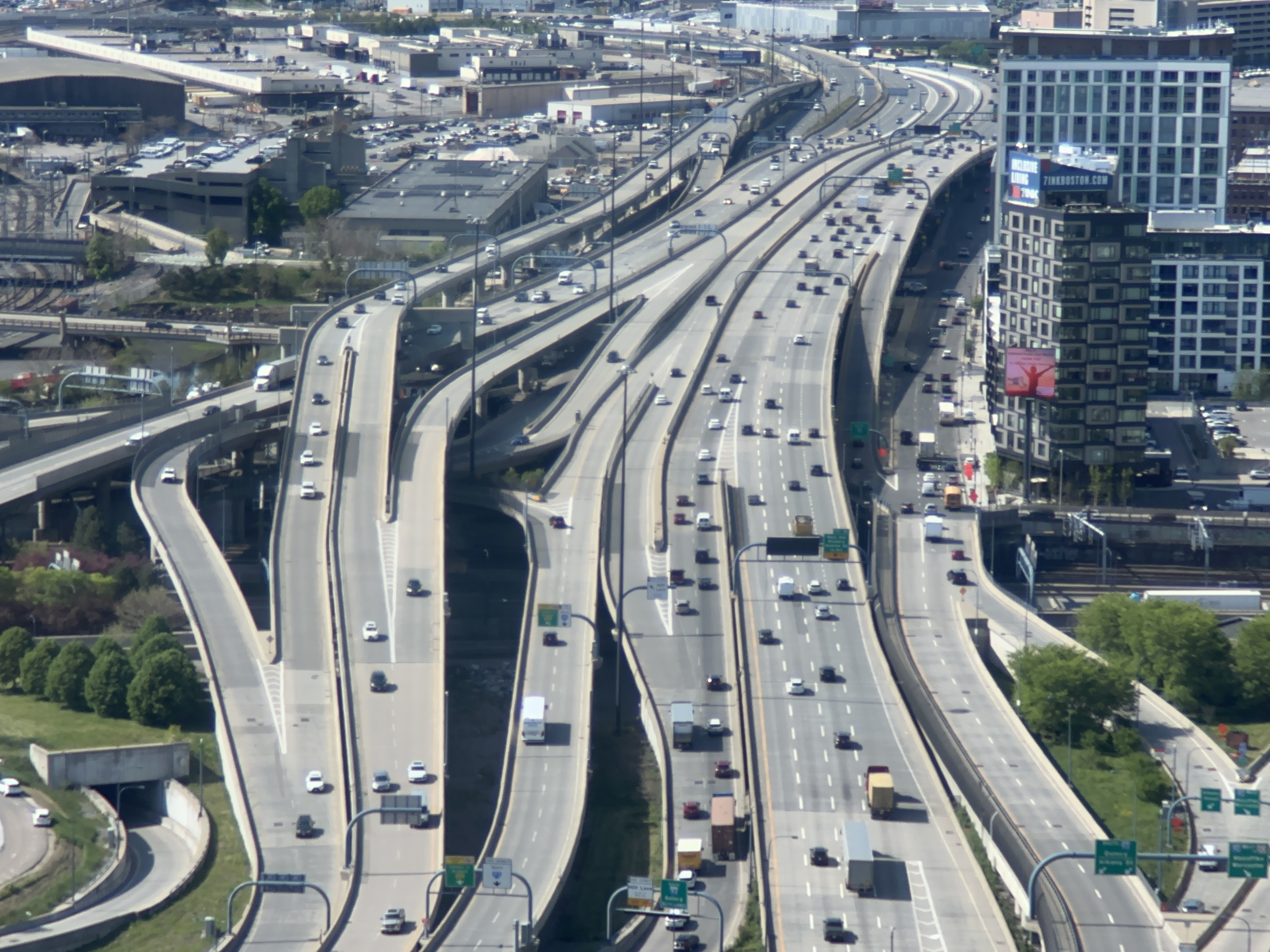
A closer view of the South Bay Interchange

The Central Artery, officially the John F. Fitzgerald Expressway, was a section of highway in Downtown Boston constructed in the 1950s and was originally designed as a fully elevated highway. This new highway was greatly disliked by the citizens of the city because it cut the heart of the city in half; cast long, dreary shadows; and was an eyesore to the community. Because of the public outcry, Governor John A. Volpe ordered the southern half of the highway redesigned so that it was underground; this section became known as the Dewey Square Tunnel. With the cancelation of the highway projects leading into the city in 1972 by Governor Francis Sargent, the Central Artery gained the designation of I-93 in 1974. It has also carried the local highway designations of US 1 (since 1989) and Route 3.

By the mid-1970s, I-93 had outgrown its capacity and had begun to deteriorate due to a lack of maintenance. State Transportation Secretary Frederick P. Salvucci, aware of the issues surrounding the elevated roadway, proposed a plan conceived in the early 1970s by the Boston Transportation Planning Review to replace the rusting elevated six-lane Central Artery with a new, more efficient underground roadway. This plan was merged with a long-standing proposal to build a third harbor tunnel to alleviate congestion in the Sumner and Callahan tunnels to East Boston; the new plan became known as the Central Artery/Tunnel Project or the Big Dig.

These new roadways were built during a 12-year period from 1994 to early 2006. The massive project became the largest urban construction project ever undertaken in US history. Construction on the new I-93 segment was not without serious issues: a lengthy federal environmental review pushed the start of construction back from approximately 1990, causing many inflationary increases, while funding for the project was the subject of several political battles between President Ronald Reagan and Representative Tip O'Neill. Major construction on the new roadway was done while maintaining the old roadway, a step that also greatly increased the cost of the project. The original Charles River crossing, named Scheme Z, was the object of great public outcry similar to that of the building of the original highway. The outcry eventually led to the replacement of Scheme Z with a newer, more sleek cable-stayed bridge and complementing exit for Cambridge, increasing the cost even more.

In Downtown Boston, I-93 is made up of the O'Neill Tunnel and Leonard P. Zakim Bunker Hill Memorial Bridge, which spans the Charles River. The underground construction of the tunnel system was completed as of October 2006; however, repairs continue to many parts of the tunnel due to water leakage because of improper construction of the slurry walls supporting the O'Neill Tunnel. The former route of the above-ground Artery, so named "the other Green Monster" by Mayor Thomas Menino, was replaced mostly by open space known formally as the Rose Fitzgerald Kennedy Greenway.

Additional improvements were done in the South Bay section of the highway: the I-90/I-93 interchange was completely redesigned, a new HOV lane extending from the zipper lane in Quincy was added and the South Boston Haul road that was constructed to bypass truck traffic around residential streets in the South End was opened to general traffic.

Hazardous cargos are prohibited from I-93 in Boston over safety issues in the tunnels; these cargos must exit at either the Leverett Circle connector when traveling southbound or at the Massachusetts Avenue exit when traveling northbound.

=== Northern Expressway ===
The Northern Expressway was constructed from Medford to the New Hampshire border between 1956 and 1963. It was extended through Somerville and Charlestown to the Central Artery, US 1, and the planned route of the so-called Inner Belt expressway—a proposed Interstate 695 (I-695)—between 1965 and 1973. Because it was already under construction, the highway was granted an exception to the moratorium on highway expansion inside Route 128 that was announced in 1970.

I-93 was originally planned with a southern terminus in Cambridge (just north of Boston), where it was to meet the Inner Belt (I-695). However, when that route was canceled and the I-95 section into Boston was canceled and rerouted onto Route 128 in the mid-1970s, I-93 was extended an additional 18 miles (29 km) southward down the Central Artery (which had been signed as a concurrency of I-95 and Route 3 before I-95 was rerouted) and the Southeast Expressway (what was then just Route 3) from Boston to Braintree and then west along Route 128 (which was later removed from this section of road in 1997) to terminate at I-95 in Canton.

In an attempt to alleviate rush-hour traffic jams, travel in the breakdown lane of I-93 is permitted between exit 35 (formerly 41) and exit 43 (formerly 46), where the highway currently has three lanes in each direction. This extra travel is permitted on the southbound side on weekdays between 6:00 am and 10:00 am and on the northbound side between 3:00 pm and 7:00 pm to align with commuting hours. However, on most busy days, this fails to prevent traffic delays. The Massachusetts State Police has expressed displeasure with this arrangement, citing that traffic in the breakdown lanes interferes with the ability of emergency vehicles to respond to accidents.

==== Rapid bridge replacement project ====
In August 2010, in Medford, a 25-by-7-foot (7.6 m × 2.1 m) section of bridge deck on the northbound side partially collapsed due to age-related structural fatigue. The collapse forced the Massachusetts Department of Transportation (MassDOT) to evaluate the remaining bridges along the corridor, eventually deciding to replace several bridges along the highway in a plan called 93 Fast 14. MassDOT set in motion a plan to replace the superstructure and concrete decks on 14 overpass bridges along that section of the Interstate, using rapid bridge replacement methods. The $98.1-million (equivalent to $141 million in 2025) project replaced bridges originally built in 1957 with a set of prefabricated modular concrete bridges in a series of weekend roadway closures. Traffic was diverted into a series of crossover lanes during construction. The main part of the project took place each weekend from June through August 2011, with the exception of the July 4 holiday weekend. One or two bridges were replaced each weekend during the construction time frame. The project was part of the commonwealth's Accelerated Bridge Program.

==== Methuen Rotary ====
Off exit 43 (formerly 46) in Methuen, the surface level traffic circle was rebuilt as part of an overall infrastructure improvement that also included constructing a new bridge carrying the Interstate over the local road, reconstructing on- and offramps to the highway, and realigning the Interstate itself.

=== New Hampshire ===
As originally envisioned by the federal government, I-93 would have followed the route of present US 3/Northwest Expressway/Everett Turnpike from Boston to Concord. By 1956, the two states had drawn up new plans for I-93 to the east, bypassing the tolled Everett Turnpike from Manchester southward along a new alignment, known as the "Northern Expressway" in Massachusetts and crossing into New Hampshire in Salem. The New Hampshire section south of Hooksett would be named the Alan B. Shepard Highway, named for the first American in space, a Derry native.

The first part of I-93 completed in New Hampshire opened in Salem from the Massachusetts border to exit 2 (NH 38/NH 97) in August 1961. The route was extended gradually northward over the next several years, reaching exit 3 (NH 111) by the end of 1961, as well as a second segment from the I-293/NH 101 west interchange to exit 7 (NH 101 east) at the same time. The two segments were connected in late 1962. This left a gap in I-93, as traffic was directed along NH 101 West and the Everett Turnpike, while the southern segment of I-93 continued on and ended in a stub at exit 7.

By 1963, the route had been completed from the end of the Everett Turnpike section, through Concord and north to Tilton (exit 20), and to NH 104 in New Hampton by 1964 (exit 23) and to Plymouth by 1965 (exit 26), and from there gradually northward until it reached the southern end of Franconia Notch. By 1977, I-93 was completed between exit 7 and the Everett Turnpike in Hooksett, completing the Alan B. Shepard Highway segment of I-93 and closing the gap that had stood for 15 years. The Everett Turnpike section had been built in 1957 and incorporated into I-93 in 1958. After the completion of the Alan B. Shepard Highway portion, the portion concurrent with NH 101 was widened to eight lanes, while the Everett Turnpike section from Hooksett to Concord was widened to six lanes in 1978.

A small segment was also completed from the northern end of Franconia Notch to Littleton prior to 1984, with the final stretch from Littleton to the Vermont border completed by 1984. This left a gap through Franconia Notch, with traffic directed along US 3 between the two sections. For years, debates over how to minimize the environmental impact of the road through the notch (including on the Old Man of the Mountain, which would collapse in 2003) prevented it being built. As a compromise the Franconia Notch Parkway, a super-two roadway with a 45-mile-per-hour (72 km/h) speed limit, was completed in June 1988, replacing US 3. Originally, this road was not included in I-93, as it had its own exit numbers and was signed "TO I-93", though, later, the parkway was officially added to the Interstate System despite the substandard conditions and the exits renumbered. The parkway opened in June 1988, replacing Route 3, and grade crossings were replaced by an overpass.

Begun in 2006 and continuing until 2021, the portion between the state border and the I-293 southern terminus was widened to eight lanes; this necessitated the rebuilding and/or relocation of several interchanges. An additional exit has been proposed near milemarker 13 that would include a new connector road to NH 28, effectively bypassing downtown Derry and relieving traffic along NH 102 at exit 4. Construction began in 2023.

=== Vermont ===
Construction of I-93 in Vermont was completed in 1982. It was planned to be built longer if I-91 did not change its designation eastward in the northeastern part of the state. It was the last Interstate to be built in the state.

== Future expansion ==
=== Massachusetts plans ===
Since 1996, the Massachusetts Highway Department (MassHighway) has studied rebuilding the interchange of I-93 and I-95 in Woburn along the border with Stoneham and Reading. The project was expected to start in early 2017 and cost $267 million but continued community opposition has postponed the project indefinitely. A project to upgrade the interchange of I-93 and I-95 in Canton is also proposed.

An additional 2010 proposal to upgrade Route 24, running southwards from I-93 exit 4 in Randolph to I-195 near Fall River, has also been put off due to studies showing the cost of the project being very high.

MassDOT and its predecessor MassHighway have planned on widening I-93 to a uniform four travel lanes in both directions from the lane drop near exit 35 (formerly 41) in Wilmington to the New Hampshire border since the beginning of the 2000s. The first section of widening will be done as part of the I-93 Tri-Town Interchange Project. The project will construct a new interchange in Wilmington. I-93 will be widened from three to four lanes in each direction from exit 35 (formerly 41) to I-495, a distance of approximately 5 miles (8 km), as the first phase in widening I-93 from exit 35 (formerly 41) to the New Hampshire state line. Early estimates of the entire project place the cost at $567 million.

=== New Hampshire plans ===
Initial plans to widen I-93 to a uniform four travel lanes in both directions from Salem to Manchester beginning in 2008 were put on hold due to a lawsuit designed to force the New Hampshire Department of Transportation (NHDOT) to update the plans to include other transportation options. Under orders from the US District Court, NHDOT and the US Department of Transportation (USDOT) were required to provide an updated environmental review. The Conservation Law Foundation (CLF) filed a lawsuit in February 2006, hoping to force any expansion plans in the area to include the restoration of commuter rail service between Manchester and Boston. Despite the suit, the exit 1 interchange construction was allowed to undergo upgrading and expansion; other associated projects related to the widening, chiefly around exits 3 and 5, were also eventually allowed to proceed. The whole set of projects were eventually allowed to move forward following an agreement between the state and the CLF that removed the group's opposition to construction which does not pose a threat to the environment.

As part of the 2009 stimulus package, New Hampshire was set to receive several million dollars in highway construction funds. One of the projects was the widening of a portion of I-93 between the Massachusetts border and Manchester. Bidding was set to begin in February 2009, with construction slated to begin in late 2009 or early 2010. The plans called for NHDOT to widen the southernmost 20 miles (32 km) of I-93 to four lanes in each direction, from the existing two lanes in each direction. In addition, all five interchanges along this length would be upgraded to accommodate larger amounts of traffic, including the replacement of many aging bridges. According to plans filed by the state with USDOT, the project was scheduled to run from 2009 through 2016, with work starting at the Massachusetts line and moving northward to Manchester. The project was designed with an intermodal transit bent; new or improved park and ride facilities were deployed at exits 1, 3, and 5, and a widened median strip was designed to accommodate a planned commuter rail service between Boston and Manchester. As a way to help defray the costs of the expansion, in early 2010, NHDOT made a formal request to the Federal Highway Administration to add tolls to I-93 at the Massachusetts–New Hampshire border. The new toll facility was to be located in Salem, approximately 0.5 miles (0.8 km) north of the state line, and would cost travelers $2.00 per vehicle. The proposal faced opposition from state legislators in both states, who claimed the tolls would cause severe congestion in the area and lead to an economic burden to local residents. Opponents included US senator Scott Brown. The proposal was eventually dropped in favor of issuing new state bonds to pay for expansion. The new policy was laid out by Transportation Commissioner George Campbell after reviewing the proposal and receiving a promise from the Massachusetts Department of Transportation that it would not be enacting a similar toll on the Massachusetts side of the border.

Plans were announced in 2012 that I-93 would receive new northbound and southbound bridges over I-89 in Bow. To reduce traffic on the southbound bridge, NHDOT added a third lane to ease congestion. The bridges were completed in 2014.

More plans were announced in 2014 that the Hooksett rest areas would be rebuilt. The new rest areas feature a 14-pump Irving Oil gas station, a new New Hampshire liquor and wine outlet, and a few restaurants and shops. The project was completed in 2015.

In Londonderry, a new interchange on I-93 connecting to the adjacent town of Derry was in final planning stages as of June 2020. Construction of exit 4A, to be located approximately a mile (1.6 km) north of exit 4 in Londonderry, began in 2022 and is scheduled to be completed in fall 2024. The interchange is part of a larger series of road improvements expected to be completed in 2026.

== Exit list ==
Massachusetts converted from sequential to distance-based exit numbering on I-93 in mid-2021. New Hampshire continues to use sequential exit numbering on all of its freeways except at interstate-to-interstate interchanges, which are usually unnumbered (exit 15E to I-393 is an exception to this convention). Vermont added "milepoint exit" numbers to existing signs in 2020, essentially marking each interchange with two exit numbers (except the I-91 interchange, which was previously unnumbered).

.

State	County	Location	mi	km	Old exit	New exit	Destinations	Notes
Massachusetts	Norfolk	Canton	0.000	0.000	–	1B	I-95 north / US 1 south (Route 128 north) – Dedham, Providence, RI	Southern terminus; southern end of US 1 concurrency
Massachusetts	Norfolk	Canton			63	1A	I-95 south – Providence, RI	Southbound exit and northbound entrance; exit 26 on I-95
Massachusetts	Norfolk	Canton	1.415	2.277	64	2	Route 138 – Stoughton, Milton	Signed as exits 2A (MA 138 south) and 2B (MA 138 north)
Massachusetts	Norfolk	Milton	2.615	4.208	65	3	Ponkapoag Trail – Houghton's Pond	
Massachusetts	Norfolk	Randolph	3.480	5.601	66	4	Route 24 south – Fall River	Left exit southbound; northern terminus and exits 41A and 41B on Route 24
Massachusetts	Norfolk	Randolph	4.233	6.812	67	5	Route 28 – Randolph, Milton	Signed as exits 5A (MA 28 south) and 5B (MA 28 north)
Massachusetts	Norfolk	Braintree	6.450	10.380	68	6	Route 37 south – West Quincy, Braintree, Holbrook	Northern terminus of Route 37
Massachusetts	Norfolk	Braintree	6.802	10.947	–	7	Route 3 south – Braintree, Cape Cod	Braintree Split; left exit southbound; southern end of Route 3 concurrency
Massachusetts	Norfolk	Quincy	8.182	13.168	–	8	Furnace Brook Parkway – Quincy	
Massachusetts	Norfolk	Milton	9.162– 9.410	14.745– 15.144	–	9	Adams Street / Bryant Avenue – Milton, North Quincy, West Quincy	Signed for Adams Street northbound, Bryant Avenue southbound
Massachusetts	Norfolk	Milton	10.134	16.309	–	10	Squantum Street – Milton	Southbound exit only
Massachusetts	Norfolk	Milton	10.837	17.440	–	11	Granite Avenue to Route 203 – Ashmont, East Milton	Signed as exits 11A (MA 203 south) and 11B (MA 203 north) southbound; no northbound access to Granite Avenue south
Massachusetts	Suffolk	Boston	11.575	18.628	–	12	Route 3A south – Neponset, Quincy	No northbound exit
Massachusetts	Suffolk	Boston	12.456	20.046	13	13A	Freeport Street – Dorchester	Northbound exit only
Massachusetts	Suffolk	Boston	12.728	20.484	14	13B	Morrissey Boulevard – Savin Hill	Northbound exit and southbound entrance
Massachusetts	Suffolk	Boston	14.343	23.083	15	14	Columbia Road – Dorchester, South Boston	
Massachusetts	Suffolk	Boston	14.820	23.850	16	15A	Southampton Street – Andrew Square	Northbound exit and southbound entrance
Massachusetts	Suffolk	Boston			17	–	Frontage Road	Former northbound exit removed during Big Dig reconstruction
Massachusetts	Suffolk	Boston	15.100– 15.929	24.301– 25.635	18	15B	Frontage Road / Massachusetts Avenue – Roxbury, Andrew Square	Signed as exit 15 southbound
Massachusetts	Suffolk	Boston			19	–	East Berkeley Street / Broadway / Albany Street	Closed as part of Big Dig reconstruction
Massachusetts	Suffolk	Boston	15.340	24.687	20	16	I-90 / Mass Pike – Logan Airport, Worcester, South Station	Northbound exit and southbound entrance; exit 134 on I-90 / Mass Pike
Massachusetts	Suffolk	Boston			–	—	South Station / Airport	Northbound left exit and southbound left entrance; former HOV-only exit until April 2021
Massachusetts	Suffolk	Boston			South end of the Thomas P. O'Neill Jr. Tunnel			
Massachusetts	Suffolk	Boston	17.253	27.766	20-22	16A	South Station	Southbound exit and northbound entrance
Massachusetts	Suffolk	Boston	17.253	27.766	20-22	16A	I-90 west / Mass Pike west / Albany Street	Southbound exit and northbound entrance; exit 134B on I-90 / Mass Pike
Massachusetts	Suffolk	Boston			21	–	Kneeland Street – Chinatown	Former southbound exit and northbound entrance; closed during Big Dig reconstruction
Massachusetts	Suffolk	Boston	16.694	26.866	22	–	Surface Road – Chinatown	Southbound entrance only
Massachusetts	Suffolk	Boston	17.340	27.906	23	17	Government Center	Northbound exit and southbound entrance; access via North Street
Massachusetts	Suffolk	Boston	17.487	28.143	23	16B	Purchase Street	Southbound exit and entrance
Massachusetts	Suffolk	Boston	17.874	28.765	24A	17A	Government Center	Southbound exit and northbound entrance
Massachusetts	Suffolk	Boston	17.874	28.765	24B	17B	Route 1A north (Callahan Tunnel) – Airport	Southbound exit and northbound entrance
Massachusetts	Suffolk	Boston			North end of the Thomas P. O'Neill Jr. Tunnel			
Massachusetts	Suffolk	Boston			25	–	Causeway Street – North Station / Haymarket Square / Government Center	Closed as part of Big Dig reconstruction
Massachusetts	Suffolk	Boston			Leonard P. Zakim Bunker Hill Memorial Bridge over the Charles River			
Massachusetts	Suffolk	Boston	17.892	28.794	26	18	Route 3 north – Storrow Drive, Cambridge	Route 3 north and Cambridge only listed on additional/separate signage northbound; northbound signage; northern end of Route 3 concurrency
Massachusetts	Suffolk	Boston	19.585	31.519	26	18	Route 28 / Route 3 north – Leverett Circle, Cambridge, Storrow Drive	Leverett Connector / North Station; southbound signage
Massachusetts	Suffolk	Boston			Charlestown High Bridge over the Charles River (demolished 2004 as part of Big Dig reconstruction; existed west of current alignment)			
Massachusetts	Suffolk	Boston	18.603	29.939	27	19	US 1 north (Tobin Bridge) – Revere	Northbound left exit and southbound entrance; northern end of US 1 concurrency
Massachusetts	Middlesex	Somerville	19.230	30.948	28	20	To Route 99 – Sullivan Square, Somerville	Northbound exit only, partially in Boston
Massachusetts	Middlesex	Somerville	20.415	32.855	28	20	Sullivan Square, Charlestown, Assembly Square	Southbound exit and northbound entrance
Massachusetts	Middlesex	Somerville	20.259	32.604	29 30	21	Route 28 / Route 38 north – Somerville, Medford	Northbound signage; southern terminus of Route 38
Massachusetts	Middlesex	Medford	21.323	34.316	29 30	21	Route 38 – Medford, Somerville	Southbound signage
Massachusetts	Middlesex	Medford	21.743	34.992	31	22	Route 16 west (Mystic Valley Parkway) – Arlington	Northbound exit and southbound entrance
Massachusetts	Middlesex	Medford	21.859	35.179	31	22	Route 16 east – Everett, Revere	Southbound exit and northbound entrance
Massachusetts	Middlesex	Medford	22.554	36.297	32	23	Route 60 – Medford, Malden	To Tufts University's Medford/Somerville Campus
Massachusetts	Middlesex	Medford	23.229	37.383	33	24	Route 28 (Fellsway West) – Winchester	Roosevelt Circle
Massachusetts	Middlesex	Stoneham	25.276	40.678	34	25	Route 28 north – Stoneham, Melrose	Northbound exit and southbound entrance
Massachusetts	Middlesex	Stoneham	26.087	41.983	35	26	Park Street – Stoneham, Melrose	Southbound exit and northbound entrance
Massachusetts	Middlesex	Woburn	26.929	43.338	36	27	Montvale Avenue – Stoneham, Woburn	
Massachusetts	Middlesex	Reading	28.476	45.828	37	28	I-95 / Route 128 – Peabody, Waltham	Signed as exits 28A (I-95 north) and 28B (I-95 south); exits 55A and 55B on I-95
Massachusetts	Middlesex	Woburn	29.965	48.224	37C	30	Commerce Way / Atlantic Avenue – Anderson RTC	
Massachusetts	Middlesex	Wilmington	31.136	50.109	38	31	Route 129 – Reading, Wilmington	
Massachusetts	Middlesex	Wilmington	32.635	52.521	39	33	Concord Street – Wilmington	
Massachusetts	Middlesex	Wilmington	34.064	54.821	40	34	Route 62 – North Reading, Wilmington	
Massachusetts	Middlesex	Wilmington	34.629	55.730	41	35	Route 125 – Andover, North Andover	
Massachusetts	Essex	Andover	37.682	60.643	42	38	Dascomb Road – Tewksbury, Andover	
Massachusetts	Essex	Andover	39.196	63.080	43	39	Route 133 – Andover, North Tewksbury	Signed as exits 39A (MA 133 east) and 39B (MA 133 west) southbound
Massachusetts	Essex	Andover	40.521	65.212	44	40	I-495 – Lawrence, Lowell	Signed as exits 40A (I-495 north) and 40B (I-495 south); exits 97A and 97B on I-495
Massachusetts	Essex	Andover	42.423	68.273	45	42	River Road – South Lawrence	
Massachusetts	Essex	Merrimack River	43.139	69.425	General Edward D. Sirois Memorial Bridge			
Massachusetts	Essex	Methuen	43.465	69.950	46	43	Route 110 / Route 113 – Lawrence, Dracut	Interchange rebuilt in 2017; signed as exits 43A (MA 110 / MA 113 east) and 43B (MA 110 / MA 113 west) northbound)
Massachusetts	Essex	Methuen	45.113	72.602	47	45	Pelham Street	
Massachusetts	Essex	Methuen	45.483	73.198	48	46	Route 213 east (Loop Connector) – Methuen, Haverhill	Western terminus and exits 1A and 1B on Route 213
			46.250 0.000	74.432 0.000	Massachusetts–New Hampshire line			
New Hampshire	Rockingham	Salem	1.368	2.202		1	Rockingham Park Boulevard to NH 28 / NH 38 – Salem	Access to The Mall at Rockingham Park and Tuscan Village
New Hampshire	Rockingham	Salem	3.001	4.830		2	To NH 38 / NH 97 – Pelham, Salem	
New Hampshire	Rockingham	Windham	5.821	9.368		3	NH 111 – Windham, North Salem	
New Hampshire	Rockingham	Londonderry	11.341	18.252		4	NH 102 – Derry, Londonderry	
New Hampshire	Rockingham	Londonderry	12.4	20.0		4A	Old Rum Trail – East Derry	Under construction.
New Hampshire	Rockingham	Londonderry	15.291	24.608		5	NH 28 – North Londonderry	
New Hampshire	Hillsborough	Manchester	18.488	29.754		—	I-293 north / NH 101 west – Manchester, Bedford	Southern terminus of I-293; southern end of NH 101 concurrency; to Manchester-Boston Regional Airport
New Hampshire	Hillsborough	Manchester	20.591	33.138		6	Candia Road, Hanover Street	Southbound exit only
New Hampshire	Hillsborough	Manchester	20.967	33.743		7	NH 101 east – Portsmouth, Seacoast	Northern end of NH 101 concurrency
New Hampshire	Hillsborough	Manchester	22.093	35.555		8	Wellington Road, Bridge Street to NH 28A	
New Hampshire	Merrimack	Hooksett	23.922	38.499		9	US 3 / NH 28 – Hooksett, Manchester	Signed as exits 9N (US 3 / NH 28 north) and 9S (US 3 / NH 28 south)
New Hampshire	Merrimack	Hooksett	25.727	41.404		10	NH 3A – Hooksett	
New Hampshire	Merrimack	Hooksett	26.689	42.952		—	I-293 south / Everett Turnpike south – Manchester, Nashua, Manchester Airport	Northern terminus of I-293; southern end of Everett Turnpike concurrency; last northbound exit before toll
New Hampshire	Merrimack	Hooksett	28.659– 28.751	46.122– 46.270		11	To NH 3A – Hooksett	Access via Hackett Hill Road
New Hampshire	Merrimack	Hooksett	28.659– 28.751	46.122– 46.270	Hooksett Toll Plaza			
New Hampshire	Merrimack	Bow	35.495	57.124		—	I-89 north – Lebanon, White River Junction VT	Southern terminus of I-89; last southbound exit before toll
New Hampshire	Merrimack	Concord	35.977	57.899		12	NH 3A (South Main Street) to I-89 north – Bow Junction	Signed as exits 12S (NH 3A south) and 12N (NH 3A north); I-89 not signed southbound
New Hampshire	Merrimack	Concord	37.331	60.078		13	US 3 (Manchester Street) – Downtown Concord	
New Hampshire	Merrimack	Concord	38.454	61.886		14	NH 9 (Loudon Road) – State Offices Everett Turnpike ends	Northern terminus of Everett Turnpike
New Hampshire	Merrimack	Concord	38.977	62.727		15	I-393 east / US 4 east / US 202 to US 3 (North Main Street) – Loudon, Portsmouth	Western terminus of I-393; southern end of US 4 concurrency; signed as exits 15E (US 4 / US 202 east) and 15W (US 4 / US 202 west)
New Hampshire	Merrimack	Concord	40.188	64.676		16	NH 132 – East Concord	
New Hampshire	Merrimack	Concord	44.582	71.748		17	US 4 west to US 3 / NH 132 – Penacook, Boscawen	Northern end of US 4 concurrency; signed as exits 17E (NH 132) and 17W (US 4) southbound
New Hampshire	Merrimack	Canterbury	47.869	77.038		18	To NH 132 – Canterbury	
New Hampshire	Merrimack	Northfield	54.976	88.475		19	NH 132 – Northfield, Franklin	Northbound exit and southbound entrance
New Hampshire	Belknap	Tilton	56.907	91.583		20	US 3 / NH 11 to NH 132 / NH 140 – Tilton, Laconia	
New Hampshire	Belknap	Sanbornton	61.159	98.426		22	NH 127 – Sanbornton, West Franklin	
New Hampshire	Belknap	New Hampton	69.229	111.413		23	NH 104 / NH 132 – Meredith, New Hampton	
New Hampshire	Grafton	Ashland	75.308	121.196		24	US 3 / NH 25 – Ashland, Holderness	
New Hampshire	Grafton	Holderness	79.992	128.735		25	NH 175A (Holderness Road) – Plymouth	Access to Plymouth State University
New Hampshire	Grafton	Plymouth	80.877	130.159		26	US 3 / NH 25 / NH 3A south – Plymouth, Rumney	Northern terminus of Route 3A
New Hampshire	Grafton	Campton	83.762	134.802		27	US 3 – Blair Bridge, West Campton	Access via Blair Road
New Hampshire	Grafton	Campton	86.819	139.722		28	NH 49 to NH 175 – Campton, Waterville Valley	
New Hampshire	Grafton	Thornton	88.542	142.495		29	US 3 – Thornton	
New Hampshire	Grafton	Woodstock	94.400	151.922		30	US 3 – Woodstock, Thornton	
New Hampshire	Grafton	Woodstock	97.334	156.644		31	Tripoli Road to NH 175	
New Hampshire	Grafton	Woodstock	100.499	161.737		32	NH 112 – Lincoln, North Woodstock	
New Hampshire	Grafton	Lincoln	102.538	165.019		33	US 3 – North Woodstock, North Lincoln	
New Hampshire	Grafton	Lincoln	104.315– 106.006	167.879– 170.600	1	34A	US 3 south – Flume Gorge, Park Information Center	Southern end of US 3 concurrency; no southbound entrance
New Hampshire	Grafton	Franconia	110.158	177.282	2	34B	Cannon Mountain Tramway – Old Man Historic Site	
New Hampshire	Grafton	Franconia	110.858	178.409	3	34C	NH 18 north – Echo Lake Beach, Peabody Slopes, Cannon Mountain	Southern terminus of NH 18
New Hampshire	Grafton	Franconia	112.315	180.753		35	US 3 north – Twin Mountain, Lancaster	Northern terminus of concurrency with US 3; northbound exit and southbound entrance
New Hampshire	Grafton	Franconia	112.947	181.771		36	NH 141 to US 3 – Twin Mountain, South Franconia	
New Hampshire	Grafton	Franconia	115.946	186.597		37	NH 18 / NH 142 – Franconia, Bethlehem	Northbound exit and southbound entrance
New Hampshire	Grafton	Franconia	116.728	187.856		38	NH 18 / NH 116 / NH 117 / NH 142 – Franconia, Sugar Hill	NH 142 not signed northbound
New Hampshire	Grafton	Bethlehem	119.295	191.987		39	NH 18 / NH 116 – North Franconia, Sugar Hill	Southbound exit and northbound entrance
New Hampshire	Grafton	Bethlehem	120.777	194.372		40	US 302 / NH 18 – Bethlehem, Twin Mountain	
New Hampshire	Grafton	Littleton	122.418	197.013		41	NH 116 (Cottage Street) – Littleton, Whitefield	
New Hampshire	Grafton	Littleton	124.397	200.198		42	US 302 / NH 10 to NH 18 – Littleton, Woodsville	
New Hampshire	Grafton	Littleton	126.129	202.985		43	NH 135 to NH 18 – Littleton, Dalton	
New Hampshire	Grafton	Littleton	130.355	209.786		44	NH 18 / NH 135 – Monroe, Waterford, VT	
Connecticut River			131.764 0.000	212.054 0.000	Senator Andrew Poulsen Bridge; New Hampshire–Vermont line			
Vermont	Caledonia	Waterford	7.510	12.086	1	7	VT 18 to US 2 – St. Johnsbury, Lower Waterford, East St. Johnsbury	
Vermont	Caledonia	Waterford	11.104	17.870	–	11	I-91 to US 5 – St. Johnsbury, White River Junction	Northern terminus; signed as exits 11A (I-91 south) and 11B (I-91 north); exit 128 on I-91
1.000 mi = 1.609 km; 1.000 km = 0.621 mi: Closed/former; Concurrency terminus; Incomplete access; Tolled

== Auxiliary routes ==
- Manchester, New Hampshire—I-293: The southernmost portion of this highway, between I-93 and the Everett Turnpike, was once known as Interstate 193.
- Concord, New Hampshire—I-393
