= New Hampshire Route 116 =

State highway in northern New Hampshire, US

New Hampshire Route 116
- Map of northwestern New Hampshire with NH 116 highlighted in red

Route information
- Maintained by NHDOT
- Length: 48.605 mi (78.222 km)

Major junctions
- South end: NH 10 in North Haverhill
- I-93 in Bethlehem; US 302 in Bethlehem; US 302 in Littleton; US 3 in Whitefield
- North end: US 2 in Jefferson

Location
- Country: United States
- State: New Hampshire
- Counties: Grafton, Coos

Highway system
- New Hampshire Highway System; Interstate; US; State; Turnpikes
← NH 115B	→ NH 117

New Hampshire Route 116 (abbreviated NH 116) is a 48.605-mile-long (78.222 km) north-south state highway in northern New Hampshire, United States. NH 116 is a scenic rural highway stretching from Haverhill, which lies along the Connecticut River, to Jefferson, in the White Mountains Region. The southern terminus is at NH 10 in the village of North Haverhill and the northern terminus is at U.S. Route 2, near the Santa's Village amusement park. Major intersections include Interstate 93, U.S. Route 3, and U.S. Route 302.

== Route description ==
The southern terminus of NH 116 lies in the village of North Haverhill within the town of Haverhill at an intersection with NH 10, just to the east of the Connecticut River. Following Benton Road to the east-southeast, it passes by Dean Memorial Airport and the village of Center Haverhill, after which it turns northeast passing to the west and north of Black Mountain State Forest. Leaving Haverhill near the town's northeastern corner, it enters the town of Benton and White Mountain National Forest. In Benton it turns to a more easterly direction and is known locally as Coventry Road. Passing the village of Boutin Corner, it crosses the extreme southern corner of the town of Landaff before passing into Easton.

Shortly after entering Easton, NH 116 merges with NH 112 along Lost River Road and then leaves to the northeast along Easton Valley Road. Near the geographic center of town, it passes through a small residential area and the road turns roughly north, passing out of the White Mountain National Forest and Easton, entering the town of Franconia from the south. Within Franconia, NH 116 runs along the western edge of town along Easton Road, coming into the main village of Franconia and joining NH 18 in concurrency just before the roadway has an interchange with I-93 (exit 38). NH 116 joins NH 18 and the two routes travel west along Main Street along the north bank of the Gale River. Just before leaving Franconia is the eastern terminus of NH 117.

Entering the town of Sugar Hill, NH 116/NH 18 curves gently towards the north while sandwiched between the Gale River to the west and I-93 to the east. Crossing the northeast corner of Sugar Hill, NH 116/NH 18 and I-93 turn away from the Gale River and head northeast into the town of Bethlehem and shortly has a partial interchange with I-93 (exit 39); there is no exit from I-93 North and no entrance onto I-93 South. Crossing the historic Rocks Estate, the two routes join US 302 westbound along Main Street, just to the east of an interchange with I-93 (exit 40). After the interchange, the now three conjoined routes enter the town of Littleton.

In Littleton, the three routes follow Bethlehem Road to an intersection with Cottage Street, turning north on Cottage Street, while an interchange with I-93 (exit 41) lies just to the south. Entering the main village of Littleton along Cottage Street, they cross the Ammonoosuc River. Immediately after the bridge, US 302 and NH 18 leave to the west along Main Street while NH 116 turns east along Union Street. Following the Ammonoosuc closely along the river's northern bank, NH 116 enters Bethlehem for a second time near the town's northwestern corner, where it is known locally as Whitefield Road. Shortly before entering the town of Whitefield, the road leaves the Ammonoosuc and turns northward.

Upon entering Whitefield, NH 116 merges with NH 142, and the two routes follow Littleton Road into the main village of Whitefield. Briefly joining US 3 on a bridge across the Johns River, NH 142 leaves the concurrency at Elm Street while NH 116 leaves to the east along Jefferson Road. Following the north bank of the Johns River out of the main village, NH 116 curves to the northeast for several miles then turns back east and enters the town of Jefferson. In Jefferson, it is known as Bailey Road. Passing through the small hamlet of Bailey, there is an S-curve in the road before crossing the Israel River. NH 116 reaches its northern terminus at US 2 near the Santa's Village amusement park.

== Major intersections ==
County	Location	mi	km	Destinations	Notes
Grafton	Haverhill	0.000	0.000	NH 10 (Dartmouth College Highway) – Piermont, Woodsville	Village of North Haverhill; western terminus
Grafton	Easton	10.183	16.388	NH 112 west (Lost River Road) – Woodsville	Western end of concurrency with NH 112
Grafton	Easton	11.064	17.806	NH 112 east (Lost River Road) – North Woodstock	Eastern end of concurrency with NH 112
Grafton	Franconia	22.176	35.689	NH 18 south (Profile Road) – South Franconia; Wallace Hill Road to I-93	Western end of concurrency with NH 18; Exit 38 on I-93
Grafton	Franconia	22.651	36.453	NH 117 west (Sugar Hill Road) – Sugar Hill, Lisbon	
Grafton	Bethlehem	24.884– 25.070	40.047– 40.346	I-93 north (Styles Bridges Highway) – Littleton	Exit 39 on I-93
Grafton	Bethlehem	26.876	43.253	US 302 east (Main Street) – Bethlehem; I-93 (Styles Bridges Highway) – Littleton, St. Johnsbury VT, Franconia, Plymouth	Western end of concurrency with US 302; Exit 40 on I-93
Grafton	Littleton	29.177	46.956	US 302 west / NH 18 north (Main Street) – Lisbon, St. Johnsbury	Eastern end of concurrency with US 302 / NH 18
Coos	Whitefield	36.123	58.134	NH 142 south (Maple Street) – Bethlehem	Western end of concurrency with NH 142
Coos	Whitefield	39.735	63.947	US 3 south (Daniel Webster Highway) – Twin Mountain	Western end of concurrency with US 3
Coos	Whitefield	39.782	64.023	NH 142 north (Elm Street) – Dalton	Eastern end of concurrency with NH 142
Coos	Whitefield	39.823	64.089	US 3 north (Lancaster Road/Daniel Webster Highway) – Lancaster	Eastern end of concurrency with US 3
Coos	Jefferson	48.605	78.222	US 2 (Presidential Highway) – Gorham, Berlin, Lancaster, Jefferson	Eastern terminus of NH 116
1.000 mi = 1.609 km; 1.000 km = 0.621 mi: Concurrency terminus; Incomplete access
