= U.S. Route 302 =

Numbered Highway in the US states of Vermont, New Hampshire, and Maine

U.S. Route 302
- US 302 highlighted in red

Route information
- Auxiliary route of US 2
- Length: 171 mi (275 km)
- Existed: 1935–present

Major junctions
- West end: US 2 in Montpelier, VT
- I-91 in Newbury, VT; I-93 in Littleton, NH; I-93 in Bethlehem, NH; US 3 in Carroll, NH; NH 16 in Bartlett, NH; NH 16 in Conway, NH; SR 35 / SR 115 in North Windham, ME; US 202 / SR 4 in Windham, ME
- East end: I-295 / US 1 / SR 100 in Portland, ME

Location
- Country: United States
- States: Vermont, New Hampshire, Maine
- Counties: VT: Washington, Caledonia, Orange; NH: Grafton, Coos, Carroll; ME: Oxford, Cumberland

Highway system
- United States Numbered Highway System; List; Special; Divided
← VT 289	VT	→ VT 313
← I-293	NH	→ I-393
← I-295	ME	→ I-395
← Route 17	N.E.	→ Route 20
← SR 17	ME	→ SR 22

U.S. Route 302 (US 302) is an east–west spur of U.S. Route 2 in northern New England in the United States. It currently runs 171 miles (275 km) from Montpelier, Vermont, beginning at US 2, to Portland, Maine, at U.S. Route 1. It passes through the states of Vermont, New Hampshire and Maine.

== Route description ==
Lengths
	mi	km
VT	35.746	57.528
NH	79.155	127.388
ME	53.9	86.7
Total	168.801	271.659

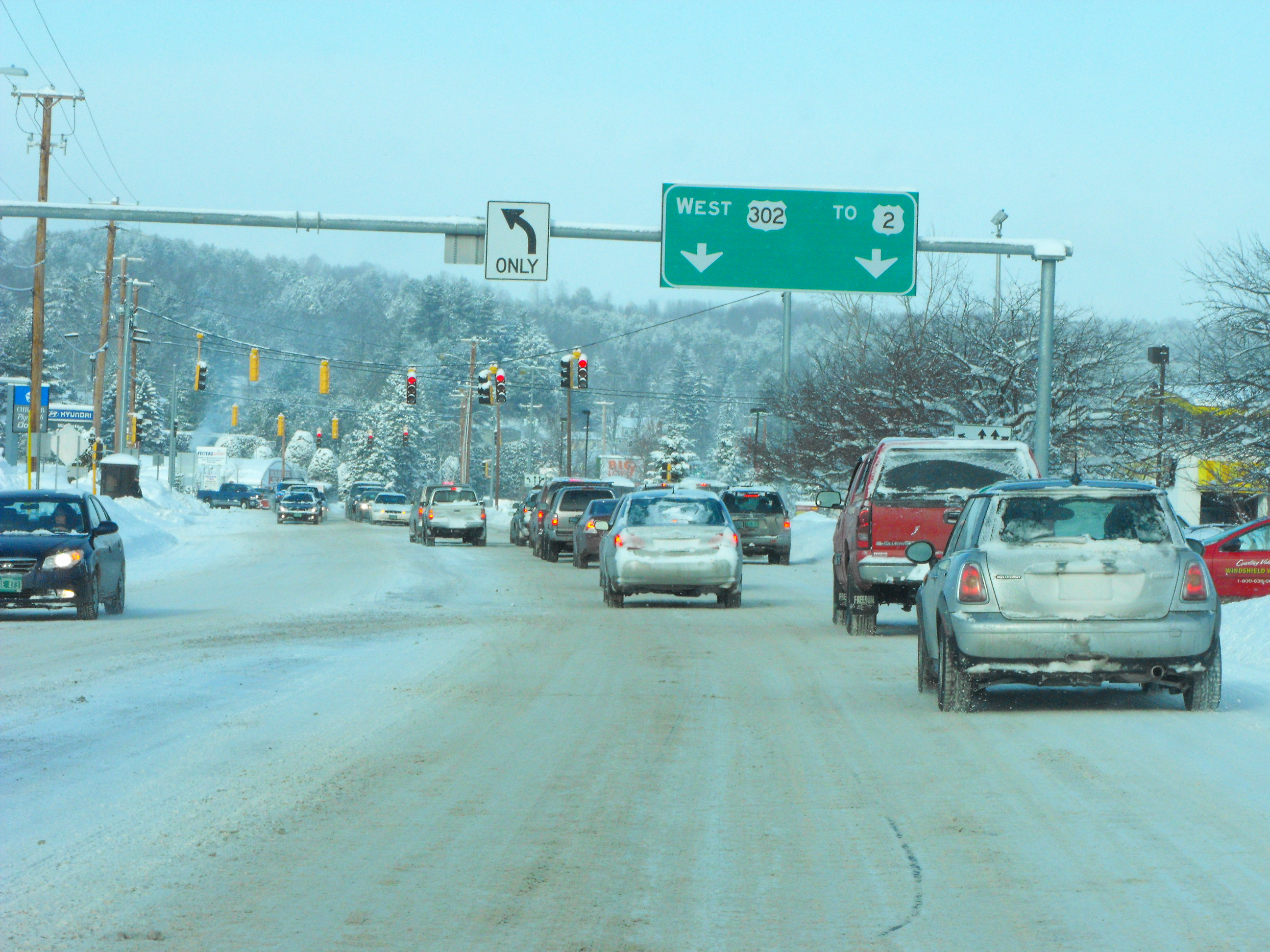
U.S. Route 302 in Berlin, Vermont, approximately two miles from the western terminus

=== Vermont ===
US 302 begins as River Street in the southeastern part of Montpelier, the state capital, at a junction with US 2. It heads southeastward up the valley of the Stevens Branch of the Winooski River, passing through the northeastern corner of the town of Berlin and entering Barre, where it becomes North Main Street. In the center of Barre, US 302 becomes Washington Street at the junction with Vermont Route 14 south, and continues southeastward up the valley of the Jail Branch River. In East Barre, US 302 has an intersection with Vermont Route 110 at a roundabout. US 302 climbs into the hills of eastern Vermont, passing through the rural town of Orange, where it crosses a height of land and crosses the valley of the Waits River, a tributary of the Connecticut River. The highway turns northeastward, passing through a corner of Topsham, crosses another height of land, and enters the valley of the Wells River in the rural town of Groton. The highway turns southeastward again, following the Wells River and passing through the village of South Ryegate, before intersecting Interstate 91 in the northern part of the town of Newbury. US 302 continues east and enters the village of Wells River, where it crosses US 5 and reaches the Connecticut River and the New Hampshire border.

US 302 is named the William Scott Memorial Highway and was part of the Theodore Roosevelt International Highway in Vermont.

=== New Hampshire ===
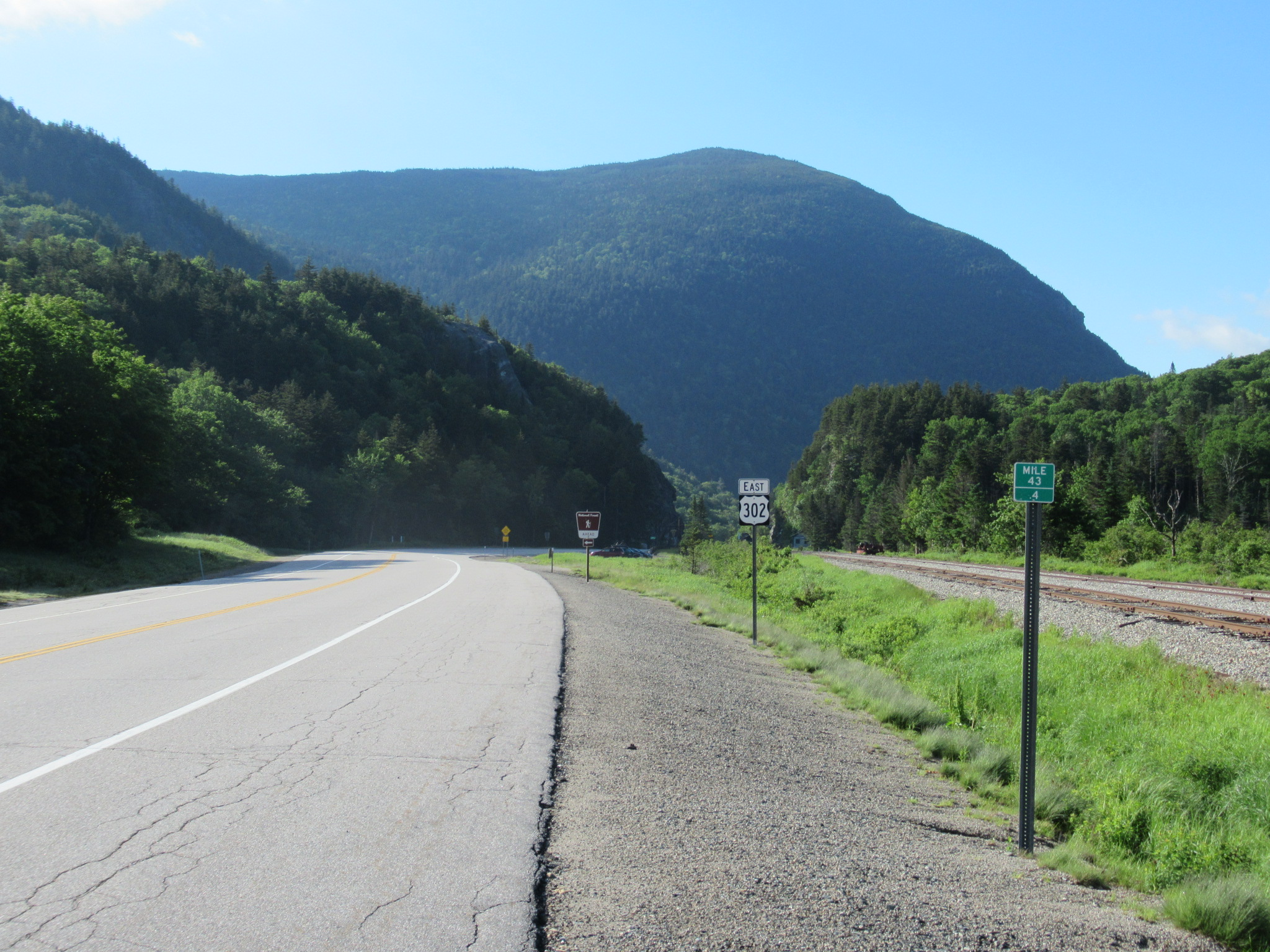
US 302 entering Crawford Notch in the White Mountains of New Hampshire

US 302 enters the state of New Hampshire at a two-lane arch bridge over the Connecticut River beginning in Wells River, Vermont. It follows Central Street on a two-lane alignment, passing through Woodsville until it reaches NH 10 (Dartmouth College Highway), where it turns eastward.

US 302 follows the Ammonoosuc River through a mix of fields and forested land, passing through Bath as Lisbon Road and Lisbon as its Main Street. As it approaches Littleton, the road's name changes to Meadow Street and becomes a shopping strip just before crossing the river and interchanging with I-93. After a short stretch, the road meets Main Street (NH18) at a skewed intersection, defaulting onto Main Street and passing through the town's downtown.

The route intersects NH 116 and turns southward onto Cottage Street, immediately bridging the Ammonoosuc River once again, and passes through a residential area before turning eastward onto Bethlehem Road. The route passes under Interstate 93 again and passes through woodland, where it crosses I-93 for a third time at a second interchange, where NH 18 and NH 116 also depart to the south. US 302 then travels eastward through largely forested land, passing through Bethlehem and Twin Mountain (where it crosses U.S. Route 3), then turns southward as it passes through Crawford Notch State Park, bearing Crawford Notch Road as its name and paralleling the Saco River.

After turning eastward again, passing through Bartlett and intersecting NH 16, the road becomes White Mountain Highway and turns southward once more, passing Lower Bartlett and entering North Conway. The route follows Eastman Road south of North Conway, which it follows to its end at NH 113 (Main Street) after bridging the Saco River once again. US 302 turns east, passing through more forested land as it crosses the Maine state border, bound for Fryeburg a short stretch east of there.

=== Maine ===
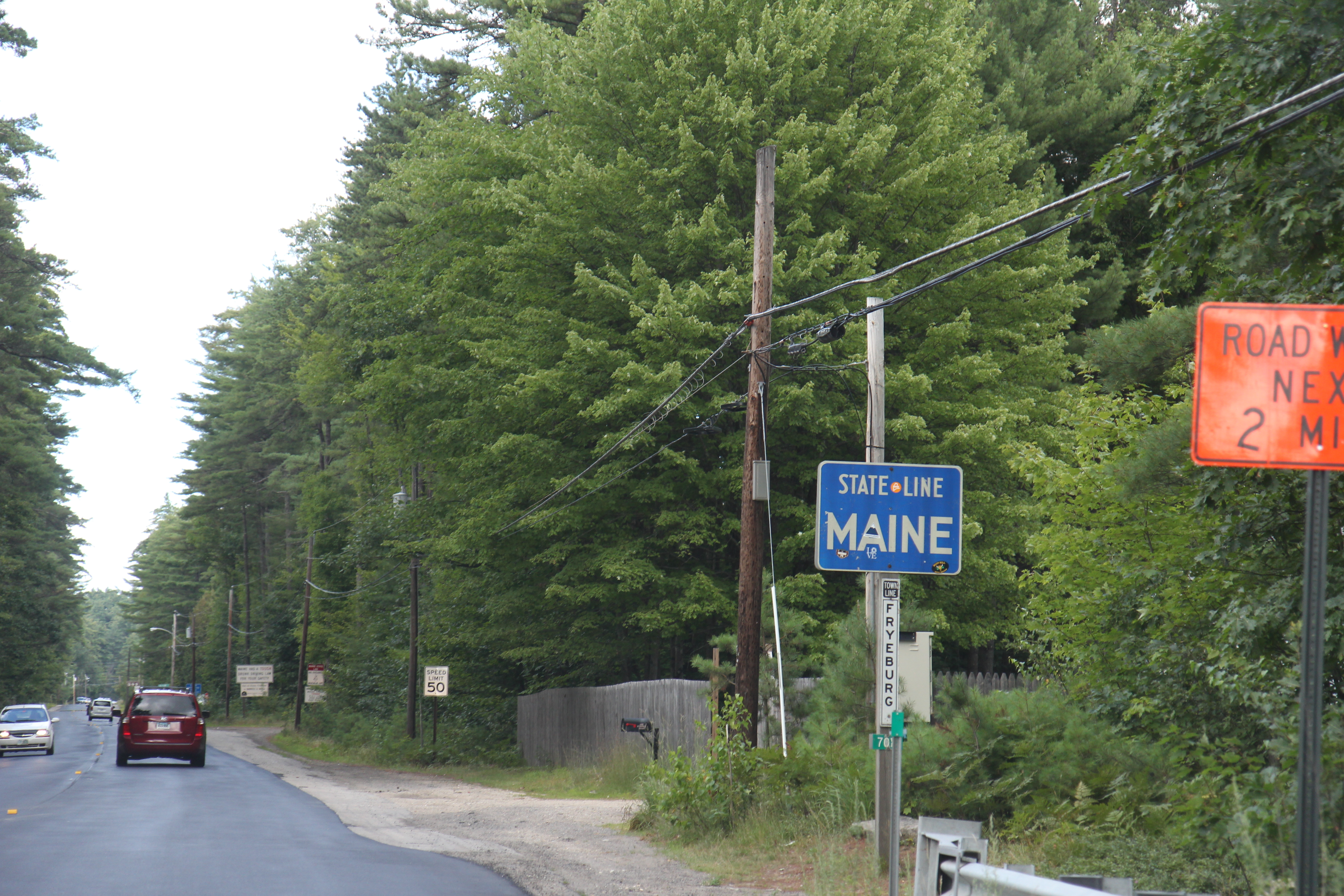
The state border sign for Maine on U.S. Route 302 in 2014

US 302 is known as the Roosevelt Trail through southern Maine because it was the beginning of the Theodore Roosevelt International Highway to Portland, Oregon. It is a two-lane highway for almost all of its length, but there are multi-lane sections within the Portland area, as well as short four-lane sections in and around North Windham in commercial areas. Some of the hilly sections also feature a third passing lane.

The highway enters Maine at Fryeburg, in the Saco River valley as it leaves the White Mountains. The road bridges the Saco near milepost 56 in eastern Fryeburg, Moose Pond near milepost 46 in Bridgton, Long Lake near milepost 31 in Naples, and the Crooked River in Casco near a boyhood home of Nathaniel Hawthorne. The highway passes the north end of Jordan Bay on Sebago Lake in the town of Raymond, and crosses the Pleasant River at milepost 13.4 in Windham. US 302 bridges the Presumpscot River from Westbrook into Portland at Riverton, then (via Forest Avenue) reaches its eastern terminus at I-295/US 1 at the south end of Back Cove via Forest Avenue.

== History ==
The eastern end of US 302 was formerly at Longfellow Square in Portland, Maine. The highway follows a 19th-century stagecoach road from Portland through Windham to Bridgton. The portion from Windham to Bridgton was built about 1785. Stagecoach service began in 1803, and the route became a post road for the United States Postal Service in 1814. Transportation over this route was augmented by the Cumberland and Oxford Canal from 1832 to 1932, and by the Bridgton and Saco River Railroad from 1883 to 1941. The highway through Crawford Notch follows the Tenth New Hampshire Turnpike built in 1803 and parallels the Maine Central Railroad Mountain Division built in 1877. The highway eliminated railway passenger travel over the route from Portland by 1958, and railroad freight service through Crawford Notch was discontinued in 1983.

State Route 18
- Location: Conway, NH—Portland
- Length: 54.18 mi (87.19 km)
- Existed: 1926–1935

From 1922 until 1935, much of what is now US 302 was a part of the New England road marking system, designated as Route 18, from Portland, Maine, northwest to Littleton, New Hampshire, roughly 112 miles (180 km). From Littleton west to Montpelier in Vermont, US 302 and Route 18 took different paths. NE-18 took a more northerly route, along present-day New Hampshire Route 18 and Vermont Route 18 to St. Johnsbury, Vermont (closely paralleling I-93), then along present-day US 2 up to Montpelier.

Current US 302 runs along a more southerly route using other former sections of New England Interstate Routes. From Littleton, it went along former Route 10 to Woodsville, New Hampshire, then along former Route 25 to Montpelier.

The entire Maine segment of US 302 was formerly designated State Route 18, a route that was established in 1926 until being deleted in 1935 by US 302.

== Major intersections ==
State	County	Location	mi	km	Destinations	Notes
Vermont	Washington	Montpelier	0.000	0.000	US 2 – East Montpelier, St. Johnsbury, Montpelier	Rotary; western terminus of US 302.
Vermont	Washington	Berlin	0.223	0.359	Berlin State Highway (VT 9030) to VT 62 west / I-89 – Berlin Corners	Northern terminus of unsigned VT 9030
Vermont	Washington	City of Barre	4.376	7.042	VT 14 north VT 62 west to I-89	Western end of concurrency with VT 14; eastern terminus of VT 62.
Vermont	Washington	City of Barre	4.833	7.778	VT 14 south to I-89	Eastern end of concurrency with VT 14.
Vermont	Washington	Town of Barre	8.639	13.903	VT 110 south – Washington, Chelsea, Granite Quarries	Northern terminus of VT 110 at rotary.
Vermont	Orange	Orange	16.041	25.815	VT 25 south – West Topsham, Bradford	Northern terminus of VT 25.
Vermont	Caledonia	Groton	23.928	38.508	VT 232 north – Rickers Mills	Southern terminus of VT 232.
Vermont	Orange	Town of Newbury	32.472– 32.681	52.259– 52.595	I-91 – Bradford, White River Junction, Barnet, St. Johnsbury	Exit 17 on I-91.
Vermont	Orange	Town of Newbury	35.334	56.865	US 5 north – East Ryegate, St. Johnsbury	Western terminus of concurrency with US 5.
Vermont	Orange	Town of Newbury	35.463	57.072	US 5 south – Newbury, Bradford	Eastern terminus of concurrency with US 5.
Connecticut River			35.746 0.000	57.528 0.000	Vermont–New Hampshire state line	
New Hampshire	Grafton	Haverhill	0.224	0.360	NH 135 (Woodsville Road / South Court Street) – Monroe	Village of Woodsville
New Hampshire	Grafton	Haverhill	1.245	2.004	NH 10 south (Dartmouth College Highway) – North Haverhill, Hanover	Northern terminus of NH 10
New Hampshire	Grafton	Bath	3.812	6.135	NH 112 east (Wild Ammonoosuc Road) – Swiftwater, North Woodstock, Lincoln	Western terminus of NH 112
New Hampshire	Grafton	Lisbon	12.960	20.857	NH 117 east (Sugar Hill Road) – Sugar Hill, Franconia	Western terminus of NH 117
New Hampshire	Grafton	Littleton	20.004– 20.152	32.193– 32.432	I-93 (Styles Bridges Highway) – Bethlehem, Concord, Dalton, St. Johnsbury VT	Exit 42 on I-93
New Hampshire	Grafton	Littleton	21.000	33.796	NH 18 north (West Main Street) to I-93 north / NH 135 – Dalton, Monroe	Western end of concurrency with NH 18
New Hampshire	Grafton	Littleton	21.556	34.691	NH 116 north (Union Street) – Whitefield, Jefferson	Western end of concurrency with NH 116
New Hampshire	Grafton	Littleton	22.088	35.547	Cottage Street	To I-93 – Franconia, Plymouth, Woodsville, St. Johnsbury VT Exit 41
New Hampshire	Grafton	Bethlehem	23.501– 23.850	37.821– 38.383	I-93 (Styles Bridges Highway) – Franconia, Plymouth, Littleton, St. Johnsbury VT	Exit 40 on I-93; no eastbound access to I-93 north; no westbound access from I-93 south
New Hampshire	Grafton	Bethlehem	23.857	38.394	NH 18 south / NH 116 south (Profile Road) – Franconia	Eastern end of concurrency with NH 18 / NH 116
New Hampshire	Grafton	Bethlehem	26.672– 26.701	42.924– 42.971	NH 142 (Agassiz Street / Maple Street) – Franconia, Whitefield	
New Hampshire	Coos	Carroll	34.796	55.999	US 3 (Daniel Webster Highway) – Whitefield, Lancaster, Plymouth	Village of Twin Mountain
New Hampshire	Carroll	Bartlett	63.892	102.824	NH 16 north (Pinkham Notch Road) – Jackson, Gorham, Berlin	Western end of concurrency with NH 16; village of Glen
New Hampshire	Carroll	Bartlett	65.026	104.649	NH 16A south – Intervale	Northern terminus of NH 16A
New Hampshire	Carroll	Bartlett	67.299	108.307	NH 16A north (Intervale Resort Loop)	Southern terminus of NH 16A
New Hampshire	Carroll	Conway	71.981	115.842	NH 16 south (White Mountain Highway) – Conway	Eastern end of concurrency with NH 16; village of North Conway
New Hampshire	Carroll	Conway	74.522	119.932	NH 113 west (East Main Street) – Conway	Eastern terminus of NH 113
			79.155 0.00	127.388 0.00	New Hampshire–Maine state line	
Maine	Oxford	Fryeburg	1.15	1.85	SR 113 north – East Conway NH, Stow	Western end of concurrency with SR 113
Maine	Oxford	Fryeburg	1.37	2.20	SR 5 south / SR 113 south – Brownfield, Old Orchard Beach	Eastern end of concurrency with SR 113; western end of concurrency with SR 5
Maine	Oxford	Fryeburg	1.79	2.88	SR 5 north – Lovell	Eastern end of concurrency with SR 5
Maine	Cumberland	Bridgton	14.96	24.08	SR 93 north – Sweden, Lovell	Southern terminus of SR 93
Maine	Cumberland	Bridgton	16.86	27.13	SR 117 north – Norway, Harrison	Western end of concurrency with SR 117
Maine	Cumberland	Bridgton	18.41	29.63	SR 117 south to SR 107 south – Denmark	Eastern end of concurrency with SR 117
Maine	Cumberland	Naples	24.94	40.14	SR 11 south / SR 114 south – Sebago Lake	Western end of concurrency with SR 11; northern terminus of SR 114
Maine	Cumberland	Naples	25.41	40.89	SR 35 north – Harrison, Waterford	Western end of concurrency with SR 35
Maine	Cumberland	Naples	26.30	42.33	SR 11 north – Mechanic Falls, Poland	Eastern end of concurrency with SR 11
Maine	Cumberland	Raymond	34.02	54.75	SR 121 north – Raymond Village, Casco	Southern terminus of SR 121
Maine	Cumberland	Raymond	34.47	55.47	SR 85 north	Southern terminus of SR 85
Maine	Cumberland	Windham	38.86	62.54	SR 35 south – Standish SR 115 east – Gray	Eastern end of concurrency with SR 35; Western terminus of SR 115
Maine	Cumberland	Windham	41.73	67.16	US 202 / SR 4 – Gray	Rotary
Maine	Cumberland	Portland	51.74	83.27	SR 100 north (Allen Avenue) – Falmouth	Western end of concurrency with SR 100
Maine	Cumberland	Portland	52.99	85.28	SR 9 east (Ocean Avenue)	Western end of wrong-way concurrency with SR 9
Maine	Cumberland	Portland	53.08	85.42	SR 9 west (Woodford Street)	Eastern end of wrong-way concurrency with SR 9
Maine	Cumberland	Portland	54.01	86.92	I-295 / US 1 – South Portland, Falmouth SR 100 south to SR 77 south	Exit 6 on I-295; Eastern terminus of US 302; eastern end of concurrency with SR 100
1.000 mi = 1.609 km; 1.000 km = 0.621 mi: Concurrency terminus; Incomplete access

== See also ==
=== Special routes ===
- U.S. Route 302 Business (Bartlett, New Hampshire), a loop connecting US 302 to Lower Bartlett. It is locally known as the Intervale Resort Loop and is signed only as New Hampshire Route 16A.

=== Related state highways ===
- New Hampshire Route 18
- Vermont Route 18
