= New Hampshire Route 18 =

State highway in Grafton County, New Hampshire, US

New Hampshire Route 18
- Map of Grafton County in northwestern New Hampshire with NH 18 highlighted in red

Route information
- Maintained by NHDOT
- Length: 20.116 mi (32.374 km)
- Existed: 1922–present

Major junctions
- South end: I-93 / US 3 in Franconia
- I-93 in Littleton; US 302 in Littleton
- North end: VT 18 in Waterford, VT

Location
- Country: United States
- State: New Hampshire
- Counties: Grafton

Highway system
- New Hampshire Highway System; Interstate; US; State; Turnpikes
| ← NH 16B | → NH 25 |
| ← Route 17 | N.E. | → Route 20 |

New Hampshire Route 18 is a 20.116-mile-long (32.374 km) state highway in northwestern New Hampshire. It is a local road serving Franconia, Bethlehem, and Littleton, New Hampshire, which I-93 bypasses. Its northern extension, Vermont Route 18, continues northward from the Connecticut River to St. Johnsbury, Vermont. NH 18 closely parallels I-93 for its entire length and has several interchanges with the Interstate highway.

== Route description ==
NH 18 begins as a spur of I-93 (the Franconia Notch Parkway) at the height of land in Franconia Notch. (U.S. Route 3 is overlapped with I-93 on the Parkway.) NH 18 proceeds to the northwest, intersecting NH 141 and NH 142, near its interchange with I-93. In downtown Franconia, NH 18 joins with NH 116 and meets the eastern end of NH 117 before leaving town and crossing into Bethlehem. NH 18 has two interchanges with I-93 in Bethlehem, joining U.S. Route 302 westbound at the second one (US 302 east provides access to downtown). The highway crosses into Littleton, splitting with NH 116 in the center of town. Just west of downtown, US 302 splits from NH 18 as well. (This intersection is signed as the northern terminus of NH 10, although this designation officially ends much further south.) Northwest of town, NH 18 joins NH 135 near another interchange with I-93. The two routes have a direct interchange with I-93 near the Connecticut River at exit 44 (I-93's last exit in New Hampshire). NH 135 splits off NH 18 before it crosses the river into Vermont (along with I-93 to its west) and becomes VT 18.

== History ==
Route 18 was originally part of the Theodore Roosevelt International Highway, a transcontinental auto trail organized in 1919 running from Portland, Oregon, to Portland, Maine, via Ontario. Within New Hampshire, the Roosevelt Highway ran 60 miles (97 km) from Littleton to Conway using modern New Hampshire Route 18 from the Connecticut River to downtown Littleton, then modern U.S. Route 302 from Littleton to the Maine line.

In 1922, the New England states adopted the New England road marking system, assigning route numbers to the main through routes in the region. The Roosevelt Highway routing in New Hampshire was assigned New England Route 18. In 1926, the New England road marking system was supplanted by the national United States Numbered Highway System. Route 18 was transferred to state highway systems in Vermont, New Hampshire and Maine.

In 1935, U.S. Route 302 was designated between Montpelier, Vermont and Portland, Maine, utilizing Route 18 east of Littleton to Portland. As a result, Route 18 was truncated on the overlapped roadways and later extended along other roads to Franconia.

== Junction list ==
The entire route is in Grafton County.

| Location | mi | km | Destinations | Notes |
|---|---|---|---|---|
| Franconia | 0.000– 0.053 | 0.000– 0.085 | I-93 / US 3 (Franconia Notch Parkway) | Southern terminus; Exit 34C on I-93 |
| Franconia | 2.804 | 4.513 | NH 141 (Butterhill Road) – Twin Mountain | Western terminus of NH 141 |
| Franconia | 4.070 | 6.550 | NH 142 (Forest Hill Road) to I-93 south – Bethlehem | Southern terminus of NH 142 |
| Franconia | 4.825 | 7.765 | NH 116 south (Easton Road) – Easton, Littleton, Plymouth; Wallace Hill Road to I-93 | Southern end of concurrency with NH 116; Exit 38 on I-93 |
| Franconia | 5.300 | 8.530 | NH 117 (Sugar Hill Road) – Sugar Hill | Eastern terminus of NH 117 |
| Bethlehem | 7.533– 7.719 | 12.123– 12.423 | I-93 north (Styles Bridges Highway) – Littleton | Exit 39 on I-93 |
| Bethlehem | 9.525 | 15.329 | I-93 (Styles Bridges Highway) / US 302 east (Main Street) – Bethlehem, Littleton, St. Johnsbury, VT, Franconia, Plymouth | Southern end of concurrency with US 302; Exit 40 on I-93 |
| Littleton | 11.826 | 19.032 | NH 116 north (Union Street) – Whitefield, Berlin | Northern end of concurrency with NH 116 |
| Littleton | 12.382 | 19.927 | US 302 west (Meadow Street) to I-93 – Lisbon, Woodsville; Also signed as NH 10 south. | Northern end of concurrency with US 302 |
| Littleton | 14.016 | 22.557 | NH 135 north (North Littleton Road) – Dalton | Southern end of wrong-way concurrency with NH 135 |
| Littleton | 18.722– 19.042 | 30.130– 30.645 | I-93 (Styles Bridges Highway) – Littleton, Plymouth, St. Johnsbury, VT | Exit 44 on I-93 |
| Littleton | 19.831 | 31.915 | NH 135 south (Monroe Road) – Woodsville, Monroe | Northern end of wrong-way concurrency with NH 135 |
| Littleton | 20.116 | 32.374 | VT 18 north – Waterford | Continuation into Vermont |
1.000 mi = 1.609 km; 1.000 km = 0.621 mi: Concurrency terminus; Incomplete access

== Road names along route ==
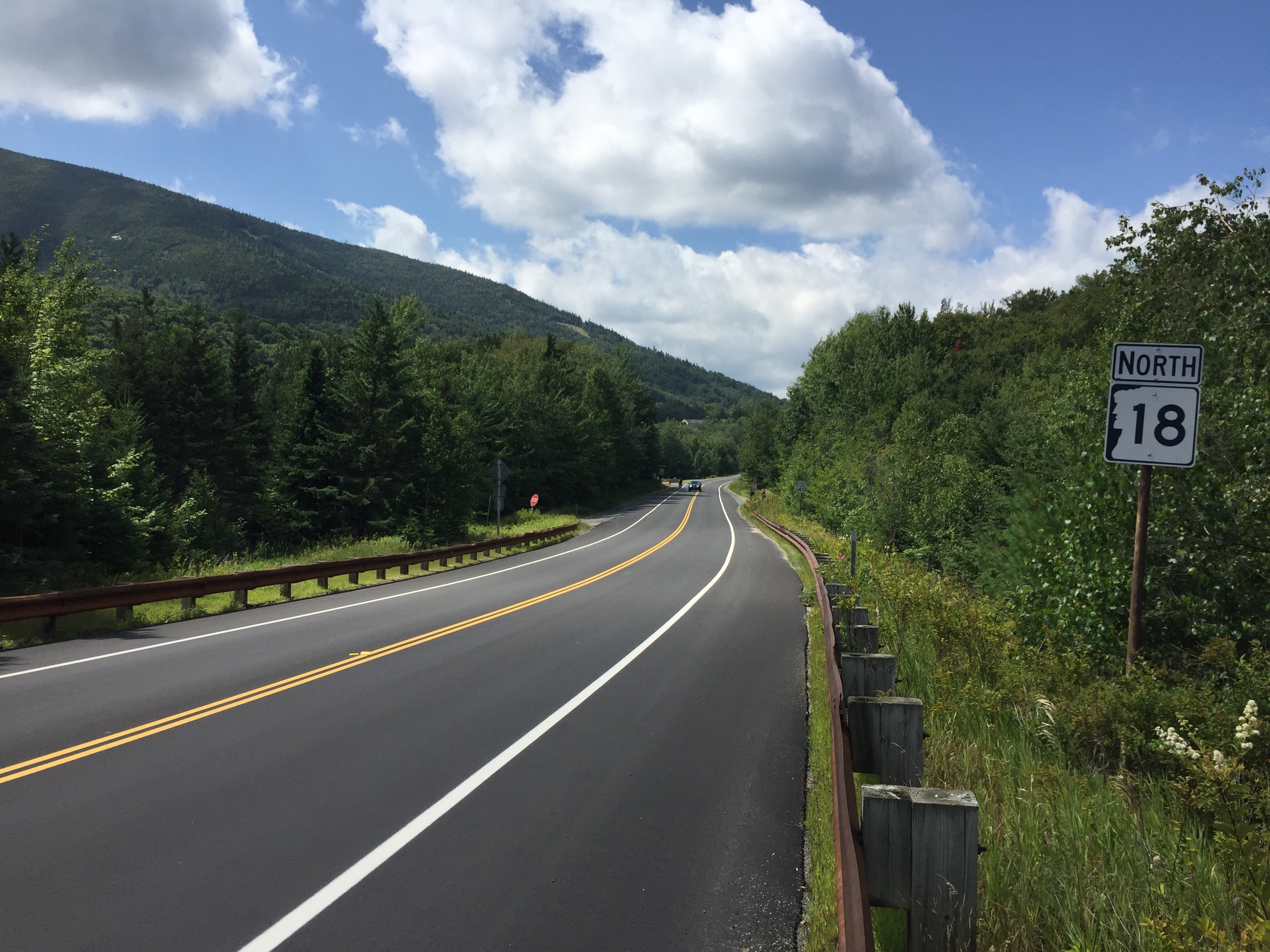
NH 18 near its southern terminus, departing Interstate 93 in Franconia Notch

NH Route 18 uses the following local road names:

Franconia

- Profile Road
- Main Street

Bethlehem

- Profile Road/Old Franconia Road
- Main Street/Dartmouth College Road

Littleton

- Bethlehem Road
- Cottage Street
- Main Street
- St. Johnsbury Road
