= NH 18 =

NH 18 may refer to:

- National Highway 18 (India)
- New Hampshire Route 18, United States
