= New Hampshire Route 135 =

State highway in New Hampshire, US

New Hampshire Route 135
- Map of northern New Hampshire with NH 135 highlighted in red

Route information
- Maintained by NHDOT
- Length: 46.677 mi (75.119 km)

Major junctions
- South end: NH 10 in Woodsville
- US 302 in Woodsville; I-93 / NH 18 in Littleton
- North end: US 2 / US 3 in Lancaster

Location
- Country: United States
- State: New Hampshire
- Counties: Grafton, Coos

Highway system
- New Hampshire Highway System; Interstate; US; State; Turnpikes
| ← NH 132 | → NH 136 |

New Hampshire Route 135 (abbreviated NH 135) is a 46.677-mile-long (75.119 km) north–south state highway in New Hampshire. The highway runs along the Connecticut River from Woodsville in the town of Haverhill to Lancaster.

The southern terminus of NH 135 is at New Hampshire Route 10 in Woodsville. The northern terminus is at U.S. Route 2 and U.S. Route 3 in Lancaster.

== Major intersections ==
| County | Location | mi | km | Destinations | Notes |
|---|---|---|---|---|---|
| Grafton | Haverhill | 0.000 | 0.000 | NH 10 – Orford, Hanover | Southern terminus |
| Grafton | Haverhill | 1.638 | 2.636 | US 302 – Wells River VT, Littleton, Hanover | Village of Woodsville |
| Grafton | Monroe | 11.530 | 18.556 | Barnet Road to US 5 – Barnet VT | |
| Grafton | Littleton | 21.779 | 35.050 | NH 18 north – Waterford VT | Southern end of wrong-way concurrency with NH 18 |
| Grafton | Littleton | 22.568– 22.888 | 36.320– 36.835 | I-93 – St. Johnsbury VT, Littleton, Plymouth | Exit 44 on I-93 |
| Grafton | Littleton | 27.593 | 44.407 | NH 18 south – Littleton | Northern end of wrong-way concurrency with NH 18 |
| Grafton | Littleton | 27.658– 27.861 | 44.511– 44.838 | I-93 – Littleton, Plymouth, St. Johnsbury VT, Monroe | Exit 43 on I-93 |
| Coos | Dalton | 38.871 | 62.557 | NH 142 south – Whitefield | Northern terminus of NH 142 |
| Coos | Lancaster | 46.677 | 75.119 | US 2 / US 3 – Groveton, Whitefield, Gorham | Northern terminus |
1.000 mi = 1.609 km; 1.000 km = 0.621 mi: Concurrency terminus
