= New Hampshire Route 141 =

State highway in Grafton County, New Hampshire, US

New Hampshire Route 141
- Butterhill Road
- Map of Grafton County in northwestern New Hampshire with NH 141 highlighted in red

Route information
- Maintained by NHDOT
- Length: 2.172 mi (3.495 km)

Major junctions
- West end: NH 18 in Franconia
- I-93 in Franconia
- East end: US 3 in Franconia

Location
- Country: United States
- State: New Hampshire
- Counties: Grafton

Highway system
- New Hampshire Highway System; Interstate; US; State; Turnpikes
← NH 140	→ NH 142

New Hampshire Route 141 (abbreviated NH 141) is a 2.172-mile-long (3.495 km) east–west state highway located entirely within the town of Franconia. Its western end is at New Hampshire Route 18. Its eastern end is at U.S. Route 3. It is called Butterhill Road for its entire length. The New Hampshire Department of Transportation maintains a major depot here for plows and maintenance equipment. It is the shortest New Hampshire state route in length.

== Major intersections ==
The entire route is in Franconia, Grafton County.

mi	km	Destinations	Notes
0.000	0.000	NH 18 – Franconia, Franconia Notch State Park	Western terminus
1.399– 1.778	2.251– 2.861	I-93 – North Woodstock, Plymouth, Franconia	Exit 36 on I-93
2.172	3.495	US 3 – Twin Mountain, Lincoln, Franconia Notch State Park	Eastern terminus
1.000 mi = 1.609 km; 1.000 km = 0.621 mi

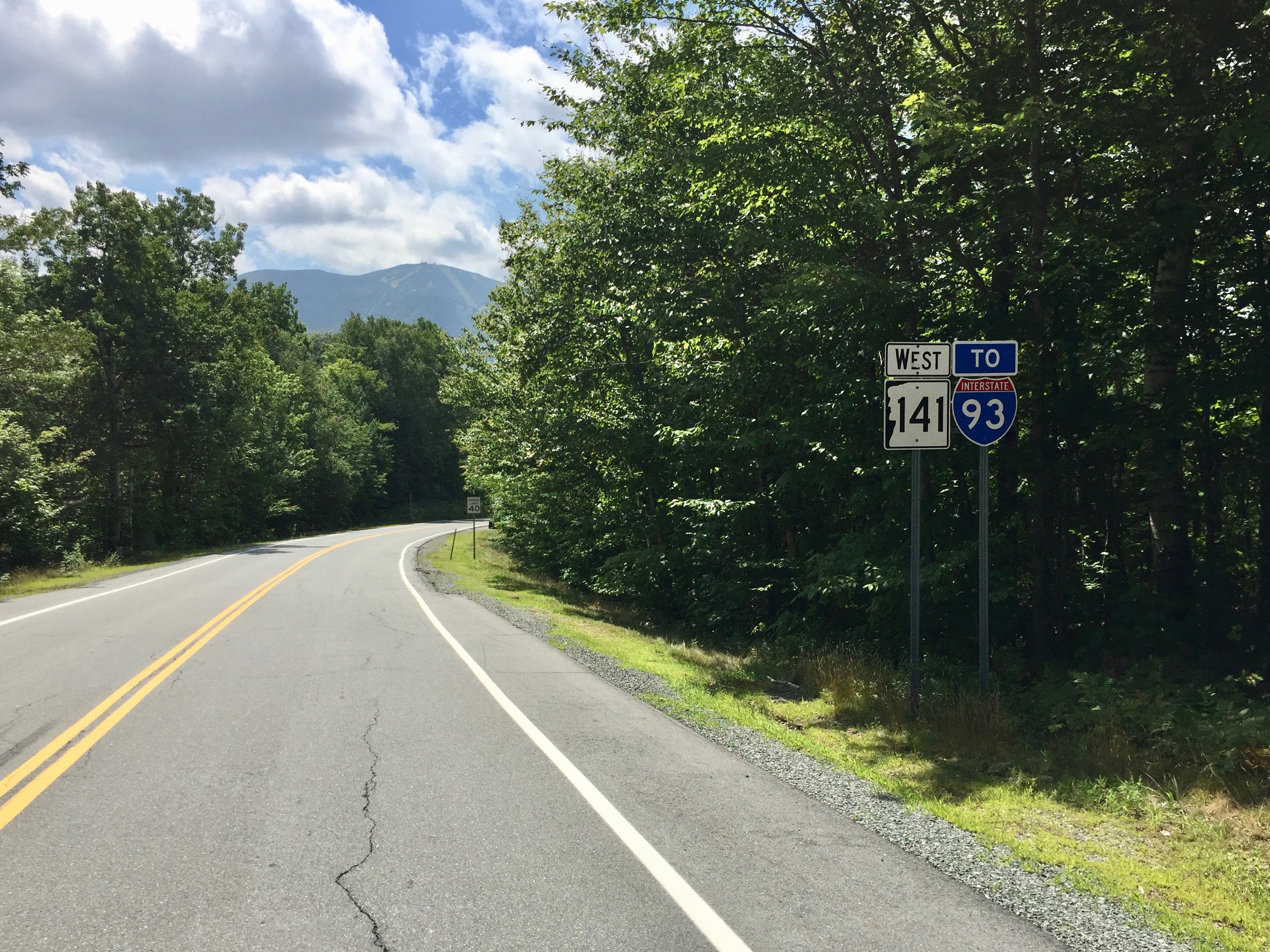
NH 141 departing its eastern terminus; Cannon Mountain in background
