= Vermont Route 18 =

State highway in Caledonia County, Vermont, US

Vermont Route 18
- VT 18 highlighted in red

Route information
- Maintained by VTrans
- Length: 7.887 mi (12.693 km)
- Existed: 1922–present

Major junctions
- South end: NH 18 at Littleton, NH
- I-93 in St. Johnsbury
- North end: US 2 in St. Johnsbury

Location
- Country: United States
- State: Vermont
- Counties: Caledonia

Highway system
- State highways in Vermont
← VT 17	→ VT 19
← Route 17	N.E.	→ Route 20

Vermont Route 18 (VT 18) is a 7.887-mile-long (12.693 km) state highway in Caledonia County, Vermont, United States. It runs from the New Hampshire state line, continuing there as New Hampshire Route 18 northward to U.S. Route 2 (US 2) in the town of St. Johnsbury. The route parallels and connects to Interstate 93 (I-93) and is a former routing of the Theodore Roosevelt International Highway.

== Route description ==
Vermont Route 18 begins at the New Hampshire state line between Littleton and Waterford. After crossing the Connecticut River into Vermont, VT 18 veers westward to cross under I-93 into Lower Waterford village. VT 18 then continues northwest running closely parallel to I-93 on its west side for roughly 7 miles (11 km) until Stiles Pond. Just north of the pond, I-93 changes direction from northwest to southwest. VT 18 crosses under I-93 at this point with an interchange at Exit 1, where US 2 Truck joins VT 18 for a short concurrency. Soon after junction with I-93, which is the only numbered exit on that route in Vermont, VT 18 and US 2 Truck end at U.S. Route 2 about 0.25 miles (0.40 km) past the St. Johnsbury town line. US 2 continues into the town center. VT 18 is part of the Connecticut River Byway.

== History ==
Vermont Route 18 was originally part of the Theodore Roosevelt International Highway, a transcontinental auto trail organized in 1919 running from Portland, Oregon to Portland, Maine via Ontario. Several years later, in 1922, the New England states adopted the New England road marking system, assigning route numbers to the main through routes in the region. The Roosevelt Highway routing in Vermont was assigned Route 14 from Burlington to Montpelier, and Route 18 from Montpelier to the New Hampshire state line in Waterford. The original Vermont portion of Route 18 ran 40 miles (64 km) from Montpelier to St. Johnsbury using modern U.S. Route 2, then modern Vermont Route 18 from St. Johnsbury to the New Hampshire line.

In late 1926, the U.S. Highway system was established. U.S. Route 2 in Vermont was designated on New England Route 14 (Burlington to Montpelier), New England Route 25 (Montpelier to Wells River) and New England Route 15 (St. Johnsbury to Lunenburg), connected by a brief overlap with U.S. Route 5. In 1935, the portion of U.S. Route 2 between Montpelier and St. Johnsbury was relocated to use the alignment of Vermont Route 18. The previous alignment from Montpelier to Wells River was designated as part of newly established U.S. Route 302, and the overlap with U.S. Route 5 was eliminated. This truncated the northern/western end of Vermont Route 18 to St. Johnsbury.

== Major intersections ==
The entire route is in Caledonia County.

Location	mi	km	Destinations	Notes
Waterford	0.000	0.000	NH 18 south	Continuation into New Hampshire
Waterford	7.305– 7.476	11.756– 12.031	I-93 – Littleton NH, St. Johnsbury	Exit 7 (I-93); diamond interchange
St. Johnsbury	7.887	12.693	US 2 – St. Johnsbury, Concord	Northern terminus
1.000 mi = 1.609 km; 1.000 km = 0.621 mi
