= Lower Waterford, Vermont =

- Village
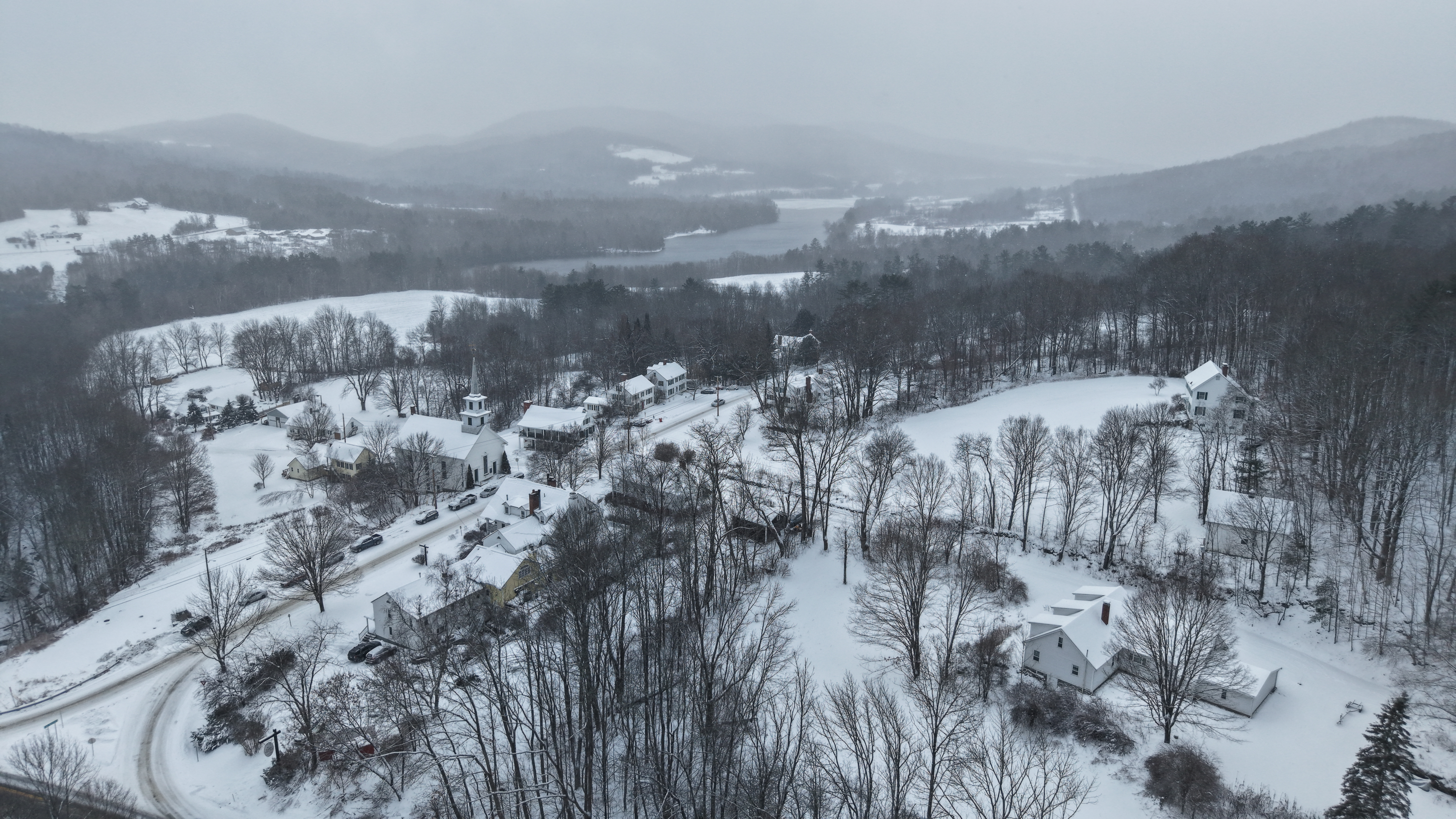
- View of Lower Waterford, VT, from the northeast

- Location within Vermont
- Coordinates: 44°21′16″N 71°54′25″W
- Country: United States
- State: Vermont
- County: Caledonia
- Elevation: 807 ft (246 m)
- Time zone: UTC-5 (Eastern (EST))
  - Summer (DST): UTC-4 (EDT)
- ZIP code: 05848
- Area code: 802
- GNIS feature ID: 1458307

Lower Waterford is an unincorporated village in the town of Waterford, Caledonia County, Vermont, United States. The community is located along Vermont Route 18 7 miles (11 km) southeast of St. Johnsbury. Lower Waterford has a post office with ZIP code 05848, which opened on February 9, 1830.
