= Theodore Roosevelt International Highway =

Former US highway

Theodore Roosevelt International Highway

Route information
- Length: 4,060 mi (6,530 km)
- Existed: January 6, 1919–1930s

Major junctions
- West end: Portland, Oregon
- East end: Portland, Maine

Location
- Countries: United States, Canada
- Provinces: Ontario
- States: Oregon, Washington, Idaho, Montana, North Dakota, Minnesota, Wisconsin, Michigan; New York, Vermont, New Hampshire, Maine

Highway system
- Auto Trails

The Theodore Roosevelt International Highway was a transcontinental North American highway, from the era of the auto trails, through the United States and Canada that ran from Portland, Maine (East Coast), to Portland, Oregon (West Coast). Its length was about 4,060 miles (6,530 km).

== Route description ==
Much of the Theodore Roosevelt International Highway's alignment was used to form U.S. Route 2 when the United States Numbered Highway System was formed in 1926. There are, however, several key differences between the Roosevelt Highway and US-2; the Roosevelt Highway was built to run from Portland, Maine to Portland, Oregon, while US-2 passes through neither of those cities. Another notable difference is that, while US-2 exists in two segments with a gap between New York and Michigan, the Roosevelt Highway was contiguous by passing through Ontario.

=== Maine ===
The highway begins in Portland, Maine at Longfellow Square where it travels up State Street and out of town along what is now U.S. Route 302. The TRIH follows US-302 out of Maine and into New Hampshire.

=== New Hampshire ===
The TRIH weaves its way through the White Mountains of New Hampshire along US-302 to Littleton where it continues along Main Street to join New Hampshire Route 18. It follows the path of Route 18 across the Connecticut River to Vermont.

=== Vermont ===
In Vermont, the highway connects to US-2 at the Moose River. It continues through the Green Mountains to Grand Isle where it crosses Lake Champlain by ferry into New York. The Grand Isle Ferry carries traffic there today.

=== New York ===
The trail continues South down U.S. Route 9 to Keeseville, then West along New York State Route 9N to Jay, New York where it turns right down NY 86. In Paul Smiths, the trail follows NY 30 most of the way to Malone, although it did depart the current alignment of NY 30 in the Titusville Mountain State Forest to follow more closely to Cold Brook Road, Studley Hill Road, and Duane Road up to Malone's Main Street to join US 11. At Moira, the trail headed north to follow along the Saint Lawrence River to Cape Vincent, then back to US 11 in Watertown, then along what was once US 104, now NY 104, into Rochester on Empire Boulevard.

Period roadmaps indicate the highway's routing between Rochester and the Canadian Border shifted continuously throughout the 1920s, shifting primarily between present day NY 18, NY 104, and NY 31. NY 18 has the significant honor of being signed as the Roosevelt Highway for a portion of its length along this segment. The ending of the trail in New York also went through a few iterations. In 1920 the trail passed through Lewiston along Center Street, then turned south at 4th Street where it crossed into Canada via the second Queenston–Lewiston Bridge to York Road. The bridge was dismantled in 1963. A 1924 alignment bypassed Lewiston and instead continued along NY 104 into Niagara Falls where it crossed into Canada along the Honeymoon Bridge. The Honeymoon Bridge collapsed in 1938 and was replaced by the Rainbow Bridge. By 1929, the US 104 route had taken precedence as the major throughway, although it's unclear as to whether the TRIH followed that route exclusively.

=== Ontario ===
From Niagara Falls, the Canadian portion of TRIH carries traffic along alignments of Ontario Highway 8, a portion of which was renamed Regional Road 81 in 1970, northwest into Hamilton, and then southwest to Tilbury on Highway 2. At Tilbury, the route turns south on Baptiste Road and then west on Essex County Road 46. A ferry transferred passengers across the Detroit River until 1930 when the Detroit-Windsor Tunnel was completed.

=== Michigan to Oregon ===
The route heads up Michigan's Upper Peninsula to Duluth, Minnesota, and then through North Dakota and northern Montana through the southern end of Glacier National Park, following close to the path of the US 2 grade. The highway passed through northern Idaho and Spokane, Washington, south on present day US 195 to Walla Walla, paralleling the US 12 roadbed, then making its way West to follow the Columbia River into Oregon at Hood River, joining US 30. The western terminus was at South Park Blocks in Portland, Oregon, where a statue of the former president stood until 2020.

In Michigan, the highway had a northern loop route in the Upper Peninsula. Between St. Ignace and Wakefield, the northern route followed what is now M-123 and M-28 while the southern route followed the rough path of today's US 2.

== History ==
The highway was designated as a memorial following Theodore Roosevelt's death on January 6, 1919. Michigan completed its section of the highway in the middle of 1926. A 56-mile (90 km) portion of the highway over the Continental Divide through Marias Pass in northwestern Montana was not completed until 1930. Automobiles were carried over the pass in Great Northern Railway cars until the highway was finished. Dedication ceremonies for the full route were held in Montana four months after the completion of the highway. The name fell into disuse after the 1930s with the 1926 designation of the United States Numbered Highway System that replaced much of its routing with numbered highway designations.
