= New Hampshire Route 142 =

State highway in northern New Hampshire, US

New Hampshire Route 142
- Map of northern New Hampshire with NH 142 highlighted in red

Route information
- Maintained by NHDOT
- Length: 19.688 mi (31.685 km)

Major junctions
- South end: NH 18 in Franconia
- I-93 in Franconia; US 302 in Bethlehem; US 3 in Whitefield
- North end: NH 135 in Dalton

Location
- Country: United States
- State: New Hampshire
- Counties: Grafton, Coos

Highway system
- New Hampshire Highway System; Interstate; US; State; Turnpikes
| ← NH 141 | → NH 145 |

New Hampshire Route 142 (abbreviated NH 142) is a 19.688-mile-long (31.685 km) north–south state highway in northern New Hampshire. The highway runs between Franconia in the White Mountains Region to Dalton in the upper Connecticut River valley.

The southern terminus of NH 142 is at the junction with New Hampshire Route 18 in Franconia. The highway winds north through Bethlehem and Whitefield, then turns northwest to Dalton. NH 142 runs concurrently with New Hampshire Route 116 for 3.659 miles (5.889 km) in Whitefield. The northern terminus is in Dalton at New Hampshire Route 135, the Connecticut River Road.

== Major intersections ==
| County | Location | mi | km | Destinations | Notes |
|---|---|---|---|---|---|
| Grafton | Franconia | 0.000 | 0.000 | NH 18 to I-93 north – So. Franconia, Franconia | Southern terminus |
| Grafton | Franconia | 0.072– 0.126 | 0.116– 0.203 | I-93 south – Lincoln, Plymouth | Exit 37 on I-93 north |
| Grafton | Bethlehem | 5.338 | 8.591 | US 302 west – Littleton | Southern end of concurrency with US 302 |
| Grafton | Bethlehem | 5.367 | 8.637 | US 302 east – Twin Mountain | Northern end of concurrency with US 302 |
| Coos | Whitefield | 10.200 | 16.415 | NH 116 west – Littleton | Southern end of concurrency with NH 116 |
| Coos | Whitefield | 13.812 | 22.228 | US 3 south – Twin Mountain | Southern end of concurrency with US 3 |
| Coos | Whitefield | 13.859 | 22.304 | US 3 north – Lancaster NH 116 east – Jefferson, Gorham | Northern end of concurrency with US 3 / NH 116 |
| Coos | Dalton | 19.688 | 31.685 | NH 135 – Dalton, Gilman VT, Lancaster | Northern terminus |
1.000 mi = 1.609 km; 1.000 km = 0.621 mi: Concurrency terminus; Incomplete access
