= Bethlehem (CDP), New Hampshire =

Census-designated place in New Hampshire, United States

Bethlehem, New Hampshire
- Census-designated place
- Center of Bethlehem, March 2024

- Location within New Hampshire Location within the United States
- Coordinates: 44°16′45″N 71°41′17″W
- Country: United States
- State: New Hampshire
- County: Grafton
- Town: Bethlehem

Area
  - Total: 1.64 sq mi (4.24 km^{2})
  - Land: 1.63 sq mi (4.23 km^{2})
  - Water: 0.0039 sq mi (0.01 km^{2})
- Elevation: 1,457 ft (444 m)

Population (2020)
  - Total: 826
  - Density: 505.4/sq mi (195.15/km^{2})
- Time zone: UTC-5 (Eastern (EST))
  - Summer (DST): UTC-4 (EDT)
- ZIP code: 03574
- Area code: 603
- FIPS code: 33-05380
- GNIS feature ID: 2629715

Bethlehem is a census-designated place (CDP) and the main village in the town of Bethlehem, New Hampshire, United States. The population of the CDP was 826 at the 2020 census, out of 2,484 in the entire town.

== Geography ==
The CDP is in the western part of the town of Bethlehem, along U.S. Route 302 at the northern base of 2,370-foot (722.3 m) Mount Agassiz. US 302 leads east 8 miles (13 km) to Twin Mountain and west 5 miles (8 km) to Littleton. New Hampshire Route 142 crosses US 302 in the center of town, leading north 8 miles (13 km) to Whitefield and south 6 miles (10 km) to Franconia village.

From the center of the village, the CDP reaches west along US 302 as far as Valley View Lane, south along NH 142 to Mountain View Lane, east on US 302 past Turner Street and Ivie Lane, and north from NH 142 down Barrett Brook, nearly to Prospect Road.

According to the U.S. Census Bureau, the Bethlehem CDP has a total area of 1.6 square miles (4.2 km^{2}), of which 2.3 acres (9,255 m^{2}), or 0.22%, are water.

== Demographics ==
Historical population
Census	Pop.	Note	%±
2010	972		—
2020	826		−15.0%
U.S. Decennial Census

As of the census of 2010, there were 972 people, 424 households, and 257 families residing in the CDP. There were 531 housing units, of which 107, or 20.2%, were vacant. 57 of the vacant units were for seasonal use. The racial makeup of the town was 97.8% white, 0.1% African American, 0.6% Native American, 0.2% Asian, 0.0% Pacific Islander, 0.2% some other race, and 1.0% from two or more races. 2.9% of the population were Hispanic or Latino of any race.

Of the 424 households in the CDP, 33.5% had children under the age of 18 living with them, 43.9% were headed by married couples living together, 13.4% had a female householder with no husband present, and 39.4% were non-families. 33.3% of all households were made up of individuals, and 8.0% were someone living alone who was 65 years of age or older. The average household size was 2.29, and the average family size was 2.91.

25.6% of people in the CDP were under the age of 18, 7.6% were from age 18 to 24, 23.5% were from 25 to 44, 33.7% were from 45 to 64, and 9.6% were 65 years of age or older. The median age was 39.8 years. For every 100 females, there were 96.8 males. For every 100 females age 18 and over, there were 90.8 males.

For the period 2011–15, the estimated median annual income for a household was $47,941, and the median income for a family was $62,500. Male full-time workers had a median income of $36,000 versus $42,875 for females. The per capita income for the CDP was $22,146. 30.0% of the population and 20.5% of families were below the poverty line, along with 38.9% of people under the age of 18 and 25.0% of people 65 or older.
