= Lancaster (CDP), New Hampshire =

Census-designated place in New Hampshire, United States

Lancaster, New Hampshire
- Census-designated place
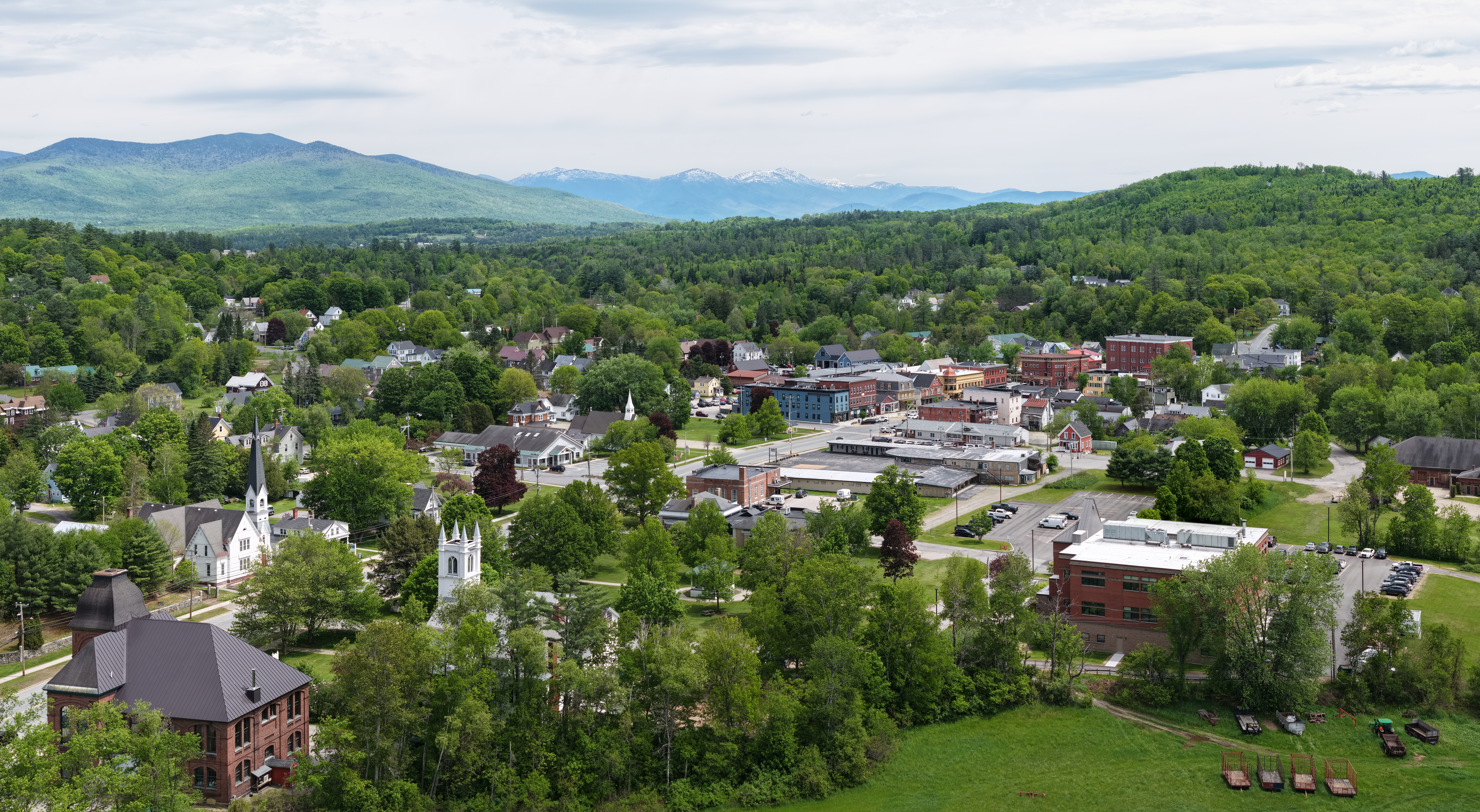
- Lancaster, NH, from the northwest

- Location within New Hampshire Location within the United States
- Coordinates: 44°29′22″N 71°34′27″W
- Country: United States
- State: New Hampshire
- County: Coos
- Town: Lancaster

Area
  - Total: 3.17 sq mi (8.21 km^{2})
  - Land: 2.98 sq mi (7.71 km^{2})
  - Water: 0.19 sq mi (0.50 km^{2})
- Elevation: 843 ft (257 m)

Population (2020)
  - Total: 1,941
  - Density: 652.3/sq mi (251.85/km^{2})
- Time zone: UTC-5 (Eastern (EST))
  - Summer (DST): UTC-4 (EDT)
- ZIP code: 03584
- Area code: 603
- FIPS code: 33-40340
- GNIS feature ID: 2378076

Lancaster is a census-designated place (CDP) and the main village in the town of Lancaster, New Hampshire, United States. The population of the CDP was 1,941 at the 2020 census, out of 3,218 in the entire town of Lancaster.

== Geography ==
The CDP is in the west-central part of the town of Lancaster, on both sides of the Israel River just east of where it joins the Connecticut River. The CDP is bordered to the northwest by the Connecticut River, which forms the Vermont state line. To the north the CDP extends to Baker Pond and the location known as "Coos Junction". The CDP extends east to include all of the streets in the densely settled part of town, crossing Middle Street just west of Weeks Medical Center. The CDP includes all of Riverside Drive and Hartco Avenue on the southeastern side of the village. To the west, the CDP extends out Elm Street beyond Blackberry Lane.

U.S. Routes 2 and 3 run through the center of Lancaster as Main Street, splitting near the northern and southern ends of the CDP. US 2 leads east 24 miles (39 km) to Gorham and west 28 miles (45 km) to St. Johnsbury, Vermont. US 3 leads north 10 miles (16 km) to Groveton and south 8 miles (13 km) to Whitefield. New Hampshire Route 135 (Elm Street) leads southwest from Lancaster 19 miles (31 km) to the outskirts of Littleton.

According to the U.S. Census Bureau, the Lancaster CDP has a total area of 3.2 square miles (8.2 km^{2}), of which 3.0 square miles (7.7 km^{2}) are land and 0.2 square miles (0.5 km^{2}), or 6.08%, are water.

== Demographics ==
Historical population
Census	Pop.	Note	%±
1950	2,296		—
1960	2,392		4.2%
1970	2,120		−11.4%
1980	2,134		0.7%
1990	1,859		−12.9%
2000	1,695		−8.8%
2010	1,725		1.8%
2020	1,941		12.5%
U.S. Decennial Census

As of the census of 2010, there were 1,725 people, 705 households, and 422 families residing in the CDP. There were 816 housing units, of which 111, or 13.6%, were vacant. The racial makeup of the town was 96.2% white, 0.5% African American, 0.9% Native American, 0.9% Asian, 0.1% Pacific Islander, 0.2% some other race, and 1.2% from two or more races. 2.5% of the population were Hispanic or Latino of any race.

Of the 705 households in the CDP, 30.8% had children under the age of 18 living with them, 42.4% were headed by married couples living together, 13.6% had a female householder with no husband present, and 40.1% were non-families. 32.1% of all households were made up of individuals, and 14.6% were someone living alone who was 65 years of age or older. The average household size was 2.30, and the average family size was 2.83.

23.7% of people in the CDP were under the age of 18, 7.5% were from age 18 to 24, 21.5% were from 25 to 44, 29.6% were from 45 to 64, and 17.7% were 65 years of age or older. The median age was 42.7 years. For every 100 females, there were 87.3 males. For every 100 females age 18 and over, there were 83.4 males.

For the period 2011–15, the estimated median annual income for a household was $57,589, and the median income for a family was $72,500. Male full-time workers had a median income of $40,449 versus $42,560 for females. The per capita income for the CDP was $29,302. 10.8% of the population and 3.0% of families were below the poverty line, along with 12.9% of people under the age of 18 and 18.8% of people 65 or older.
