= Whitefield (CDP), New Hampshire =

Census-designated place in New Hampshire, United States

Whitefield, New Hampshire
- Census-designated place
- Location within New Hampshire Location within the United States
- Coordinates: 44°22′28″N 71°36′40″W
- Country: United States
- State: New Hampshire
- County: Coos
- Town: Whitefield

Area
  - Total: 1.59 sq mi (4.13 km^{2})
  - Land: 1.59 sq mi (4.13 km^{2})
  - Water: 0 sq mi (0.00 km^{2})
- Elevation: 948 ft (289 m)

Population (2020)
  - Total: 1,460
  - Density: 916.1/sq mi (353.69/km^{2})
- Time zone: UTC-5 (Eastern (EST))
  - Summer (DST): UTC-4 (EDT)
- ZIP code: 03598
- Area code: 603
- FIPS code: 33-84340
- GNIS feature ID: 2378095

Whitefield is a census-designated place (CDP) and the main village in the town of Whitefield, New Hampshire, United States. The population of the CDP was 1,460 at the 2020 census, out of 2,490 people in the entire town of Whitefield.

== Geography ==
The CDP is in the west-central part of the town of Whitefield, on both sides of the Johns River, a westward-flowing tributary of the Connecticut River. It extends north into the town of Dalton. The northern edge of the CDP is north of Meadowmist Drive and follows Mirror Lake Road, while to the east the CDP extends beyond Holly Heights and Balsam Lane. The southeastern border of the CDP runs east of Whitefield Elementary School, then follows Greenwood Street/South Whitefield Road south to Bog Brook, which forms the western border of the CDP down to the Johns River.

U.S. Route 3 runs through the center of Whitefield, leading north 8 miles (13 km) to Lancaster, the Coos County seat, and south the same distance to Twin Mountain. New Hampshire Route 116 also passes through the center of town, leading northeastward 9 miles (14 km) to Jefferson and southwestward 10 miles (16 km) to Littleton. New Hampshire Route 142 leads northwest from Whitefield 7 miles (11 km) to Dalton and south-southwest 8 miles (13 km) to Bethlehem.

According to the U.S. Census Bureau, the Whitefield CDP has a total area of 1.6 square miles (4.1 km^{2}), all of it recorded as land.

== Demographics ==
Historical population
Census	Pop.	Note	%±
1950	1,329		—
1960	1,244		−6.4%
1970	1,093		−12.1%
1980	1,005		−8.1%
1990	1,041		3.6%
2000	1,089		4.6%
2010	1,142		4.9%
2020	1,460		27.8%
U.S. Decennial Census

As of the census of 2010, there were 1,142 people, 476 households, and 283 families residing in the CDP. There were 544 housing units, of which 68, or 12.5%, were vacant. The racial makeup of the town was 94.8% white, 0.2% African American, 0.5% Native American, 0.4% Asian, 0.0% Pacific Islander, 2.1% some other race, and 1.9% from two or more races. 3.6% of the population were Hispanic or Latino of any race.

Of the 476 households in the CDP, 29.6% had children under the age of 18 living with them, 43.5% were headed by married couples living together, 11.8% had a female householder with no husband present, and 40.5% were non-families. 34.5% of all households were made up of individuals, and 15.8% were someone living alone who was 65 years of age or older. The average household size was 2.30, and the average family size was 2.92.

23.3% of people in the CDP were under the age of 18, 6.7% were from age 18 to 24, 25.0% were from 25 to 44, 26.6% were from 45 to 64, and 18.5% were 65 years of age or older. The median age was 41.1 years. For every 100 females, there were 88.1 males. For every 100 females age 18 and over, there were 85.6 males.

For the period 2011–15, the estimated median annual income for a household was $31,743, and the median income for a family was $46,597. Male full-time workers had a median income of $41,944 versus $32,311 for females. The per capita income for the CDP was $21,220. 17.3% of the population and 11.6% of families were below the poverty line, along with 16.5% of people under the age of 18 and 20.8% of people 65 or older.
