= List of dams and reservoirs in Vermont =

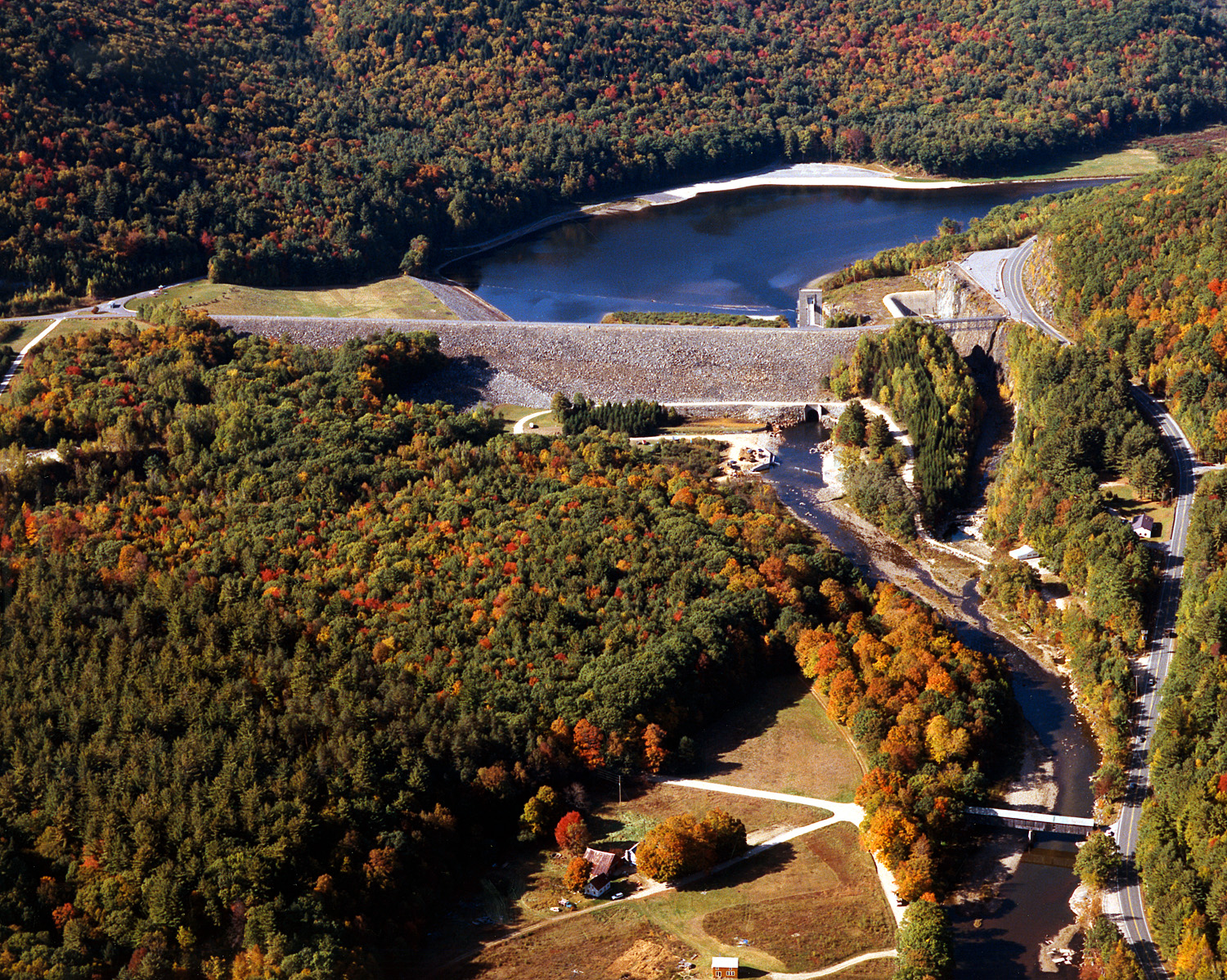
Townshend Dam and Lake

Following is a list of dams and reservoirs in Vermont.

All major dams are linked below. The National Inventory of Dams defines any "major dam" as being 50 feet (15 m) tall with a storage capacity of at least 5,000 acre-feet (6,200,000 m^{3}), or of any height with a storage capacity of 25,000 acre-feet (31,000,000 m^{3}).

== Dams and reservoirs in Vermont ==
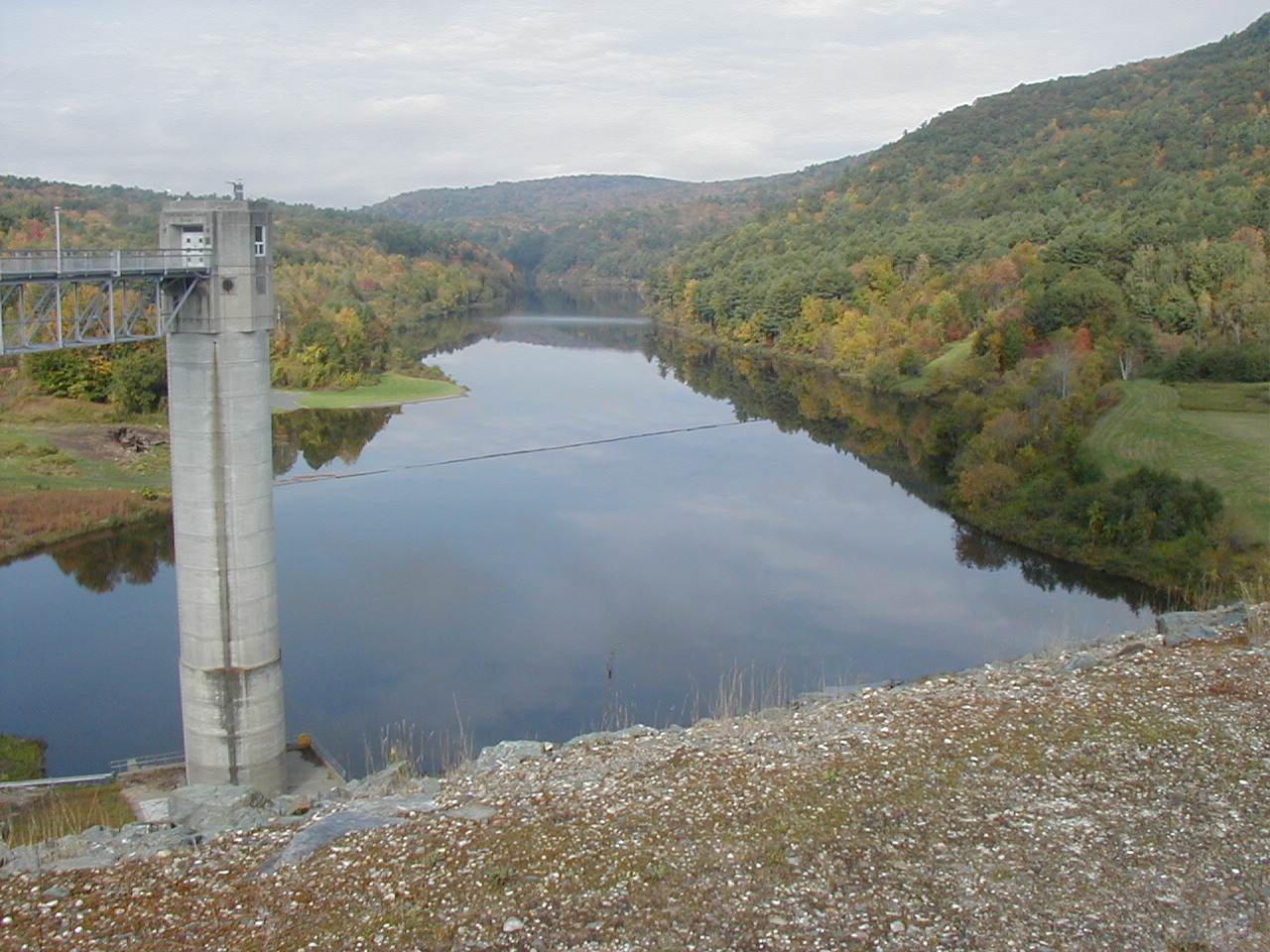
North Hartland Lake

This list is incomplete. You can help Wikipedia by expanding it.

- Ascutney Mill Dam, Mill Pond, privately owned
- Ball Mountain Dam, Ball Mountain Lake, United States Army Corps of Engineers
- Frank D. Comerford Dam, Comerford Reservoir, TransCanada Corporation (on New Hampshire border)
- Lake Dunmore Dam, Lake Dunmore, Central Vermont Public Service Corp.
- East Barre Dam, Jail Branch River (seasonal reservoir), state of Vermont
- Green River Dam, Green River Reservoir, village of Morrisville
- Green River Crib Dam, in Guilford
- Harriman Dam, Harriman Reservoir, TransCanada Corporation
- Indian Brook Dam, Indian Brook Reservoir, town of Essex
- McIndoes Falls Dam, McIndoes Reservoir, TransCanada
- Moore Dam, Moore Reservoir, TransCanada Corporation (on New Hampshire border)
- North Hartland Dam, North Hartland Lake, USACE
- Union Village Dam, Ompompanoosuc River (seasonal reservoir), USACE
- Somerset Reservoir Dam, Somerset Reservoir, Somerset Water Department
- Townshend Dam, Townshend Lake, USACE
- Waterbury Dam, Waterbury Reservoir, USACE
- Wrightsville Dam, Wrightsville Reservoir, Winooski River (seasonal reservoir), State of Vermont

== See also ==
- List of dam removals in Vermont
