= List of dams and reservoirs in New Hampshire =

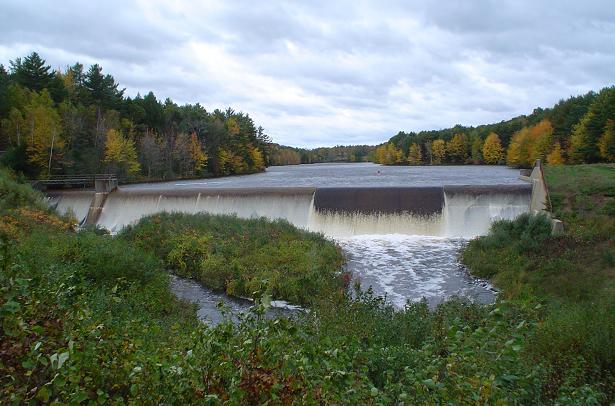
Bellamy Reservoir

Following is a list of dams and reservoirs in New Hampshire.

All major dams are linked below. The National Inventory of Dams defines any "major dam" as being 50 feet (15 m) tall with a storage capacity of at least 5,000 acre-feet (6,200,000 m^{3}), or of any height with a storage capacity of 25,000 acre-feet (31,000,000 m^{3}).

== Dams and reservoirs in New Hampshire ==
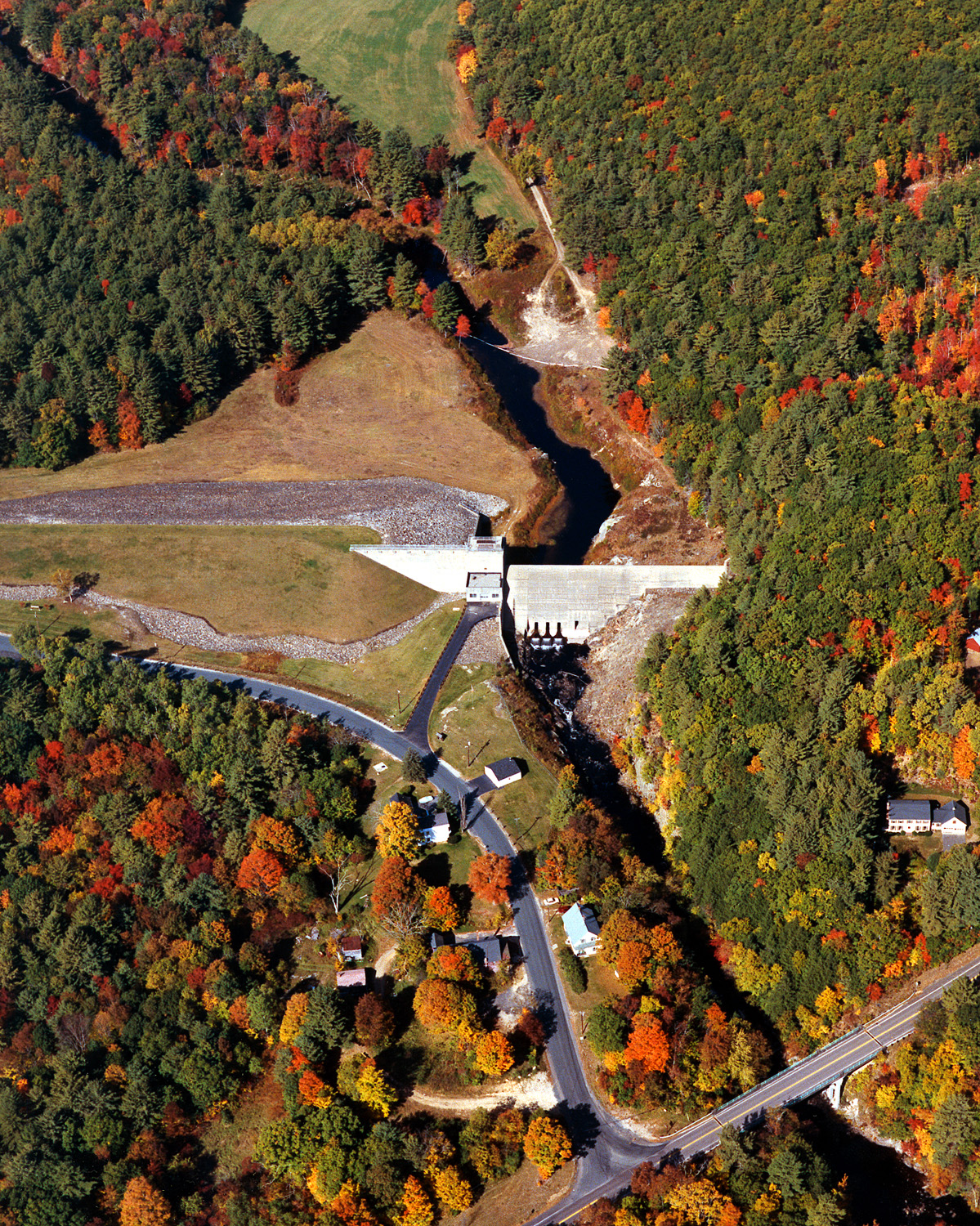
Blackwater Dam and Reservoir

This list is incomplete. You can help Wikipedia by expanding it.

- Ayers Island Dam, Ayers Island Reservoir, Public Service Company Of New Hampshire
- Bellamy Reservoir Dam, Bellamy Reservoir, City of Portsmouth, New Hampshire
- Blackwater Dam, Blackwater Reservoir, United States Army Corps of Engineers
- Deering Dam, Deering Reservoir, New Hampshire Water Resources Council
- Everett Dam, Hopkinton-Everett Reservoir, USACE
- Frank D. Comerford Dam, Comerford Reservoir, TransCanada Corporation (on Vermont border)
- Franklin Falls Dam, Franklin Falls Reservoir, USACE
- Franklin Pierce Dam, Franklin Pierce Lake, Public Service Company Of New Hampshire
- Hopkinton Dam, Hopkinton-Everett Reservoir, USACE
- Jericho Pond Dam, Jericho Lake, privately owned
- Edward MacDowell Dam, Edward MacDowell Lake, USACE
- McIndoes Dam, McIndoes Reservoir, TransCanada Corporation (on Vermont border)
- Meadow Pond Dam (failed), privately owned
- Moore Dam, Moore Reservoir, TransCanada Corporation (on Vermont border)
- Murphy Dam, Lake Francis, New Hampshire Water Resources Council
- Otter Brook Dam, Otter Brook Reservoir, USACE
- Pontook Dam, Pontook Reservoir, New Hampshire Water Resources Council
- Surry Mountain Dam, Surry Mountain Lake, USACE
- Weare Dam, Weare Reservoir, New Hampshire Water Resources Council
- Wheeler Dam, Arlington Mill Reservoir, Town of Salem, New Hampshire

== See also ==
- List of dam removals in New Hampshire
