= List of lakes of Vermont =

This is a list of lakes in Vermont. Swimming, fishing, and/or boating are permitted in some of these lakes, but not all.

The Vermont Department of Health and Department of Environmental Conservation establish the limits of Escherichia coli allowed before swimming is permitted. The E. coli is not checked for type, some of which are not harmful to humans. They allow up to 235 colonies per 100 millilitres (3.5 imp fl oz; 3.4 US fl oz) of water sampled.

- Arrowhead Mountain Lake
- Ball Mountain Lake
- Lake Bomoseen
- Lake Carmi
- Caspian Lake
- Cedar Lake
- Lake Champlain (extends into Quebec; largest lake New England)
- Comerford Reservoir
- Crystal Lake
- Lake Dunmore
- Echo Lake
- Lake Eden
- Lake Elmore
- Lake Fairlee
- Griffith Lake
- Lake Groton
- Harriman Reservoir
- Harvey's Lake
- Lake Iroquois
- Island Pond
- McIndoes Reservoir
- Lake Memphremagog (extends into Quebec)
- Maidstone Lake
- Moore Reservoir
- Lake Morey
- North Hartland Lake
- North Springfield Lake
- Lake Parker
- Lake Rescue
- Lake Saint Catherine
- Lake Salem
- Lake Seymour
- Silver Lake
- Ticklenaked Pond
- Townshend Lake
- Wallace Pond (extends into Quebec)
- Lake Willoughby
- Lake Winona
