= List of dam removals in Vermont =

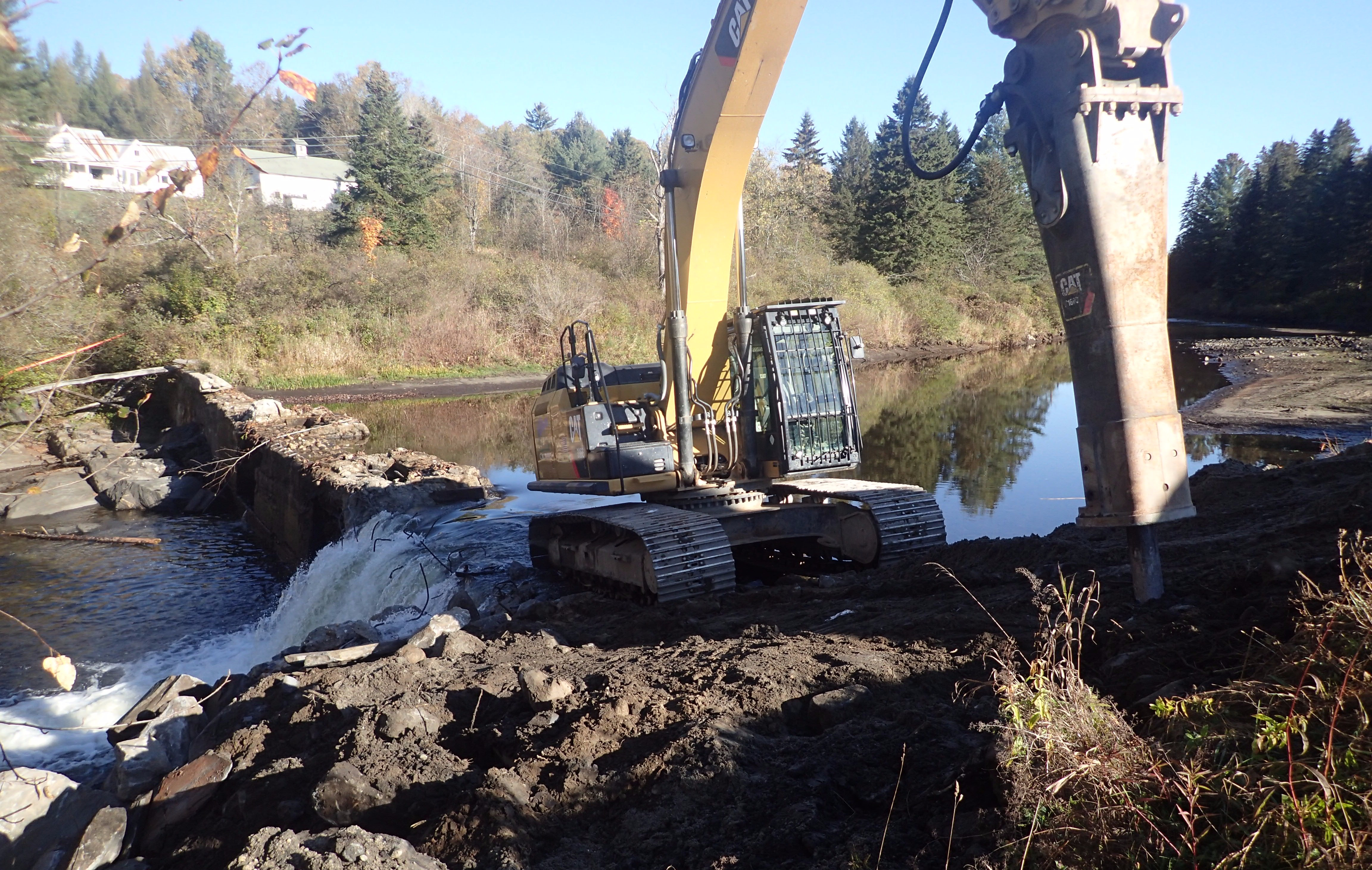
The 2017 removal of the East Burke Dam from the East Branch Passumpsic River in East Burke.

This is a list of dams in Vermont that have been removed as physical impediments to free-flowing rivers or streams.

== Removals by watershed ==
=== Missisquoi River ===
The East Highgate Dam was a former mill and manufacturing dam on the Missisquoi River that had been mostly destroyed during the Great Vermont Flood of 1927. The remaining dam remnants were removed in 2017 to improve paddling safety on the Northern Forest Canoe Trail.

== Completed removals ==
Dam	Height	Year removed	Location	Watercourse	Watershed
Lawrence Dam (Guilford Dam)	6 ft (1.8 m)	2021	Guilford; 42.7851°N 72.598°W	Broad Brook	Connecticut River
Norwich Reservoir Dam	20 ft (6.1 m)	2018	Norwich; 43.7299°N 72.3323°W	Charles Brown Brook	Connecticut River
Wyoming Paper Co. Dam Remnant	3 ft (0.91 m)	2022	Guildhall; 44.5638°N 71.5597°W	Connecticut River	Connecticut River
Johnson Dam	8 ft (2.4 m)	2019	Dummerston; 42.917°N 72.5553°W	Tributary to Connecticut River	Connecticut River
Upper Hurricane Reservoir Dam		2010	White River Junction; 43.6431°N 72.3727°W	Tributary to Kilburn Brook	Connecticut River
Lower Hurricane Reservoir Dam		2012	White River Junction; 43.6468°N 72.3691°W	Tributary to Kilburn Brook	Connecticut River
Harrington Road Dam		2017	West Windsor; 43.4628°N 72.4785°W	Mill Brook	Connecticut River
Ascutney Snowmaking Diversion Dam	3 ft (0.91 m)	2017	West Windsor; 43.4668°N 72.4709°W	Mill Brook	Connecticut River
Henne Dam	6 ft (1.8 m)	2020	Weathersfield; 43.4202°N 72.4529°W	Tributary to Mill Brook	Connecticut River
Zebedee Wetland Dam	4 ft (1.2 m)	2010	Thetford; 43.8231°N 72.2236°W	Zebedee Brook	Connecticut River
Cold Brook Dam	3 ft (0.91 m)	2018	Wilmington; 42.8993°N 72.8597°W	Cold Brook	Deerfield River
Red Mill Dam		1974	Arlington; 43.1056°N 73.2584°W	Batten Kill	Hudson River
Dufresne Dam	12 ft (3.7 m)	2013	Manchester; 43.1793°N 73.0303°W	Batten Kill	Hudson River
Henry Bridge Dam		2013	North Bennington; 42.9123°N 73.2544°W	Walloomsac River	Hudson River
Crooked Creek Button Farm Dam (Colchester Dam)	11 ft (3.4 m)	2022	Colchester; 44.5358°N 73.1683°W	Crooked Creek	Lake Champlain
Mill Pond Dam	12 ft (3.7 m)	2019	Colchester; 44.5418°N 73.1527°W	Indian Brook	Lake Champlain
Johnson State Dam	30 ft (9.1 m)	2003	Johnson; 44.6442°N 72.6744°W	Tributary to Lamoille River	Lamoille River
Stevensville Brook Dam	10 ft (3.0 m)	2008	Underhill; 44.5066°N 72.8669°W	Stevensville Brook	Lamoille River
Pelletier Dam	20 ft (6.1 m)	2022	Castleton; 43.622°N 73.1623°W	Breton Brook	Mettawee River
Reynolds Dam		2022	Dorset; 43.2607°N 73.0883°W	Mettawee River	Mettawee River
East Highgate Dam		2017	Highgate; 44.93°N 72.99°W	Missisquoi River	Missisquoi River
Johnson Mill Dam	17 ft (5.2 m)	2021	Bakersfield; 44.8316°N 72.7556°W	Bogue Branch	Missisquoi River
Montague Dam	13 ft (4.0 m)	2022	Post Mills; 43.8825°N 72.2617°W	Ompompanoosuc River	Ompompanoosuc River
Geer Dam	6 ft (1.8 m)	2017	West Fairlee; 43.9134°N 72.2621°W	Ompompanoosuc River	Ompompanoosuc River
Hillside Farm Dam	18 ft (5.5 m)	2003	Norwich; 43.7846°N 72.2705°W	Tributary to Ompompanoosuc River	Ompompanoosuc River
Pinney Hollow Brook Dam	12 ft (3.7 m)	2007	Plymouth; 43.5535°N 72.7076°W	Pinney Hollow Brook	Ottauquechee River
East Pittsford Dam			Pittsford; 43.6774°N 72.9482°W	East Creek	Otter Creek
Beaver Pond Dam	12 ft (3.7 m)	2013	Mendon; 43.6677°N 72.8548°W	Tributary to Mendon Brook	Otter Creek
Lower Eddy Pond Dam	20 ft (6.1 m)	1981	Rutland; 43.5919°N 72.9626°W	Mussey Brook	Otter Creek
Kendrick Pond Dam	13 ft (4.0 m)	2014	Pittsford; 43.723°N 73.021°W	Sugar Hollow Brook	Otter Creek
Dunklee Pond Dam	10 ft (3.0 m)	2021	Rutland; 43.6214°N 72.9741°W	Tenney Brook	Otter Creek
Youngs Brook Dam	46 ft (14 m)	1995	West Rutland; 43.5722°N 73.0517°W	Youngs Brook	Otter Creek
East Burke Dam	13 ft (4.0 m)	2017	East Burke; 44.5885°N 71.9466°W	East Branch Passumpsic River	Passumpsic River
Lyndon State College Lower Dam			Lyndon; 44.5368°N 72.0238°W	Tributary to Passumpsic River	Passumpsic River
Browns Mill Dam		2021	West Burke; 44.6419°N 71.9794°W	Sutton River	Passumpsic River
Newport No. 11 Dam	19 ft (5.8 m)	1996	Newport; 44.9362°N 72.1832°W	Clyde River	St. Francois River
Newport Remnant Dam		2006	Newport; 44.9373°N 72.1797°W	Clyde River	St. Francois River
Groton Dam (Sanville Dam)	5 ft (1.5 m)	1998	Groton; 44.2101°N 72.1979°W	Wells River	Wells River
Franconia Paper Co. Dam	6 ft (1.8 m)	2014	Groton; 44.2201°N 72.2173°W	Wells River	Wells River
Groton #9 Dam	10 ft (3.0 m)	2015	Groton; 44.2082°N 72.1913°W	Wells River	Wells River
Kidder Hill Dam	6 ft (1.8 m)	2019	Grafton; 43.1687°N 72.6063°W	Saxtons River	West River
Dalewood Dam		2006	Jamaica; 43.1088°N 72.8548°W	Tributary to North Branch Ball Mountain Brook	West River
Weston Lower Dam		2019	Weston; 43.2918°N 72.7958°W	Tributary to West River	West River
Bagatelle Dam	7 ft (2.1 m)	2017	Dummerston; 42.9334°N 72.599°W	Tributary to West River	West River
Magic Mountain Dam	8 ft (2.4 m)	2020	Londonderry; 43.2081°N 72.7767°W	Thompsonburg Brook	West River
Montagna Dams 1 & 2		2021	Windham; 43.15°N 72.73°W	Turkey Mountain Brook	West River
Lower Eaton Dam	15 ft (4.6 m)	2019	Royalton; 43.8322°N 72.515°W	First Branch White River	White River
Upper Eaton Dam	8 ft (2.4 m)	2019	South Royalton; 43.8322°N 72.5137°W	First Branch White River	White River
Camp Killooleet Dam	14 ft (4.3 m)	2018	Hancock; 43.9268°N 72.8461°W	Hancock Branch	White River
Hyde Dam	14 ft (4.3 m)	2021	Bethel; 43.8721°N 72.5863°W	Second Branch White River	White River
Randolph Dam (Sargent, Osgood, and Roundy Dam)	4 ft (1.2 m)	2016	Randolph; 43.9267°N 72.6659°W	Third Branch White River	White River
Camp Wihakowi Dam	13 ft (4.0 m)	2020	Northfield; 44.1064°N 72.6754°W	Bull Run	Winooski River
Cox Brook Dam	10 ft (3.0 m)	2008	Northfield Falls; 44.1738°N 72.6546°W	Cox Brook	Winooski River
Shashoua Dam	20 ft (6.1 m)	2018	Warren; 44.0927°N 72.8447°W	Tributary to Mad River	Winooski River
Union Brook Dam	18 ft (5.5 m)	2010	Northfield; 44.1614°N 72.6803°W	Union Brook	Winooski River
Marshfield-8 Dam	11 ft (3.4 m)	2012	Marshfield; 44.3503°N 72.3517°W	Winooski River	Winooski River

== See also ==
- List of dam removals in New Hampshire
- List of dam removals in Massachusetts
- List of dam removals in New York (state)
