= Comerford Reservoir =

Reservoir in Vermont and New Hampshire, US

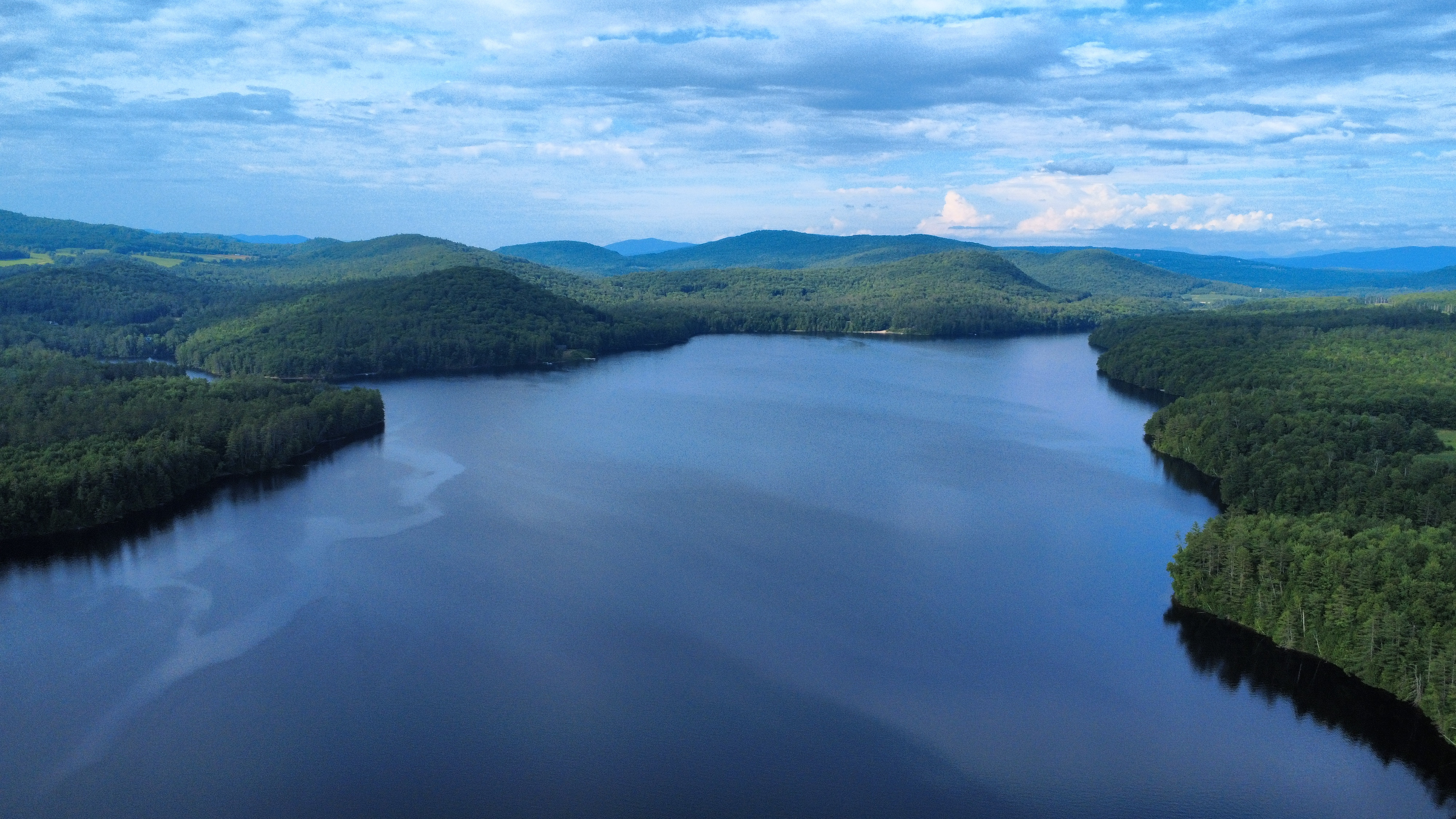
- View looking upstream over Comerford Reservoir, near the Comerford Dam

- Location within New Hampshire Location within Vermont Location within the United States
- Location: Caledonia County, Vermont; Grafton County, New Hampshire
- Coordinates: 44°19′31″N 72°0′03″W
- Type: Reservoir
- Primary inflows: Connecticut River
- Primary outflows: Connecticut River
- Basin countries: United States
- Max. length: 7.3 mi (11.7 km)
- Max. width: 1.1 mi (1.8 km)
- Surface area: 1,029 acres (4 km^{2})
- Surface elevation: 647 ft (197 m)
- Settlements: Monroe, NH; Littleton, NH; Barnet, VT; Waterford, VT

Comerford Reservoir is a 1,029-acre (4 km^{2}) impoundment located on the Connecticut River on the boundary between Vermont and New Hampshire in the United States. The reservoir is formed by the Frank D. Comerford Dam in the towns of Monroe, New Hampshire, and Barnet, Vermont, and impounds water into the towns of Littleton, New Hampshire, and Waterford, Vermont, nearly to the Moore Reservoir upstream on the Connecticut.

== See also ==
- List of lakes in New Hampshire
- List of lakes in Vermont
