= Moore Dam =

Dam on the border of New Hampshire and Vermont

- Moore Dam from the west

- Location within Vermont Location within New Hampshire
- Country: United States
- Location: New Hampshire and Vermont
- Coordinates: 44°20′09″N 71°52′29″W
- Purpose: Hydroelectric
- Construction began: 1954; 72 years ago
- Opening date: 1956; 70 years ago
- Owner: TransCanada

Dam and spillways
- Type of dam: Embankment, gravity
- Impounds: Connecticut River
- Height (foundation): 178 ft (54 m)
- Length: 2,920 ft (890 m)
- Spillway type: Gated overflow

Reservoir
- Total capacity: 223,722 acre⋅ft (275,957,000 m^{3})
- Catchment area: 1,514 mi^{2} (3,920 km^{2})
- Surface area: 3,490 acres (1,410 ha)
- Normal elevation: 809 ft (247 m)

Moore Station
- Type: Conventional
- Hydraulic head: 150 ft (46 m)
- Turbines: 4x 56,400 HP Francis
- Installed capacity: 140.4 MW (rated)
- Annual generation: 314,300,000 KWh (2009)

Moore Dam is a major hydroelectric dam on the Upper Connecticut River between Grafton County, New Hampshire and Caledonia County, Vermont in the northeastern United States. The dam is located near Littleton, New Hampshire, and forms the 3,490-acre (1,410 ha) Moore Reservoir. The Moore Station is the largest conventional hydroelectric plant in New England, in terms of installed capacity and average power generation. The dam and reservoir also provide flood control, recreational boating and fishing.

The official name of the dam is the Samuel C. Moore Dam, after a former president of the now defunct New England Power Company that originally built it. The dam, reservoir and power station are now owned and operated by Great River Hydro, LLC.

== History ==
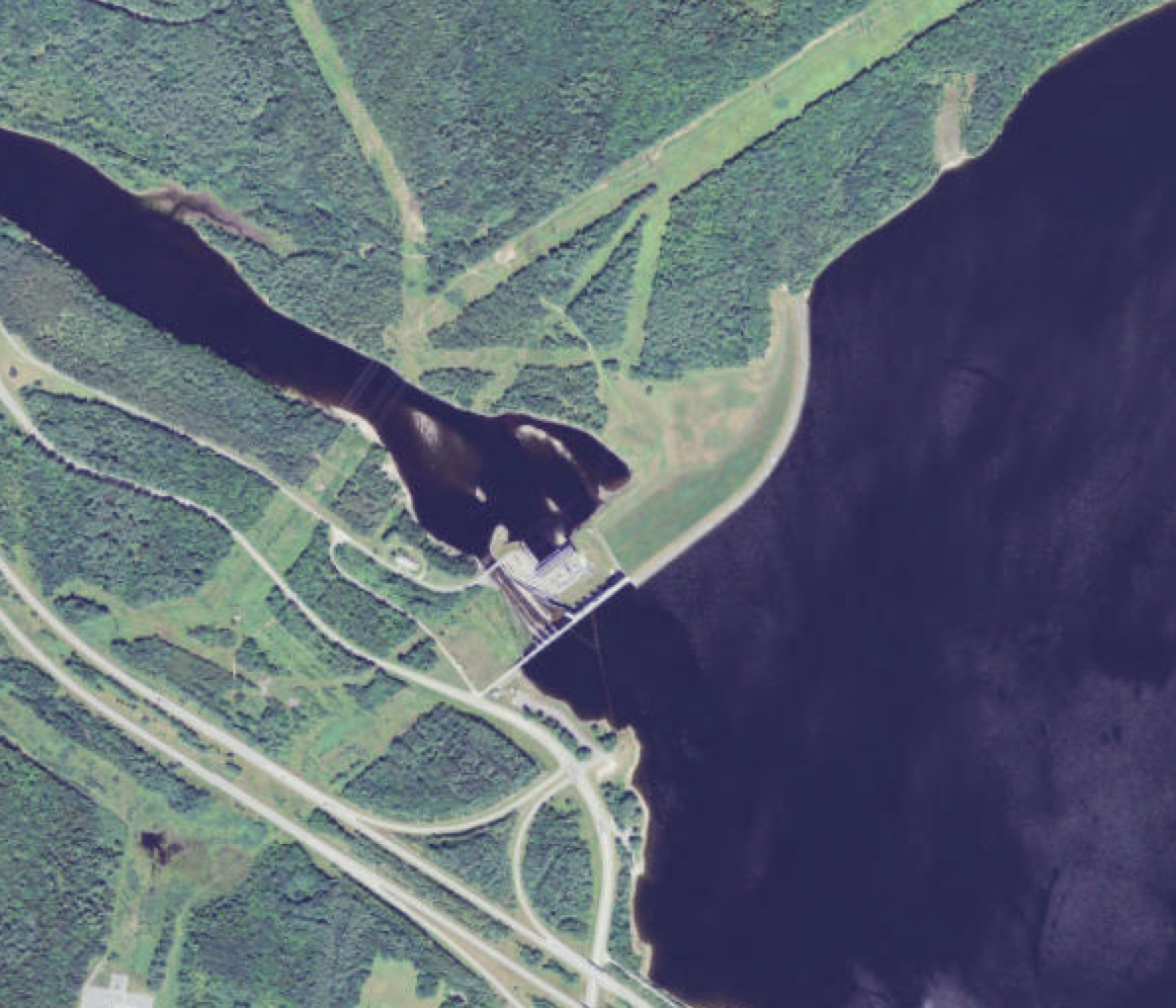
Satellite view of the dam

The Moore Dam is the uppermost feature of the Fifteen Miles Falls hydroelectric project, which began development in the early 1900s by New England Power (later USGen New England). Before damming, the "Fifteen Miles Falls" was a fast flowing whitewater section of the Connecticut River, where it dropped 350 feet (110 m) over the course of 15 miles (24 km), making it the longest single stretch of whitewater in the northeastern US. The steep grade and heavy flow also made it ideal for the construction of water mills, and later, hydroelectric plants. In 1908 Carl A. Ross of Littleton pitched the proposal to Massachusetts investors who agreed to finance the project. The two lower plants, Comerford Dam 8 miles (13 km) downstream and McIndoe Dam 14 miles (23 km) downstream, were completed in 1930 and 1931 respectively.

Site preparations for Moore Reservoir commenced in the mid-1930s, with the clearing of over 3,000 acres of farmland and forest to allow for future flooding. The towns of Upper Waterford, Vermont and Pattenville, New Hampshire were demolished; however, with the onset of the Great Depression preliminary work on Moore Dam was halted. Construction was not resumed until 1954, and was completed in 1956, at a cost of $41 million. The dam was dedicated, and power generation begun, on June 20, 1957.

The embankment section of the dam has experienced seepage problems at several points in its lifetime, the first during the 1980s, which was corrected in 1996 with the construction of a drainage system. The leak re-emerged in 2009 and 2010, when it was discovered that water was leaking between the dam structure and the original ground surface, requiring extensive re-construction and filling work.

In 2005 USGen New England filed for bankruptcy, and TC Energy (formerly TransCanada Corporation) purchased Moore Dam and 13 other hydroelectric stations for the sum of $505 million. As of 2016, TransCanada intends to sell the dam to local utilities in Vermont and New Hampshire.

== Operations ==
While most dams along the Connecticut River have small reservoirs, capable only of regulating daily fluctuations in water level, Moore Dam has a large storage capacity used both to regulate river flows on a seasonal basis, and to generate peaking power on demand. Along with Comerford Dam, it helps reduce spring floods due to snowmelt, at the same time capturing water for use during drier parts of the year. During the late fall or winter, the reservoir is drawn down to provide space for the incoming snowmelt. The snowpack is measured throughout the winter and reservoir levels are adjusted up or down based on these measurements. The typical seasonal draw down is between 30 and 40 feet (9.1 and 12.2 m).

Due to its size and security requirements, Moore Dam is one of only two dams in New Hampshire that has a human operator living on-site (the other being the Murphy Dam).

== Statistics ==
Moore Dam is a composite earthen and concrete dam located 283 miles (455 km) upstream from where the Connecticut River meets the Atlantic Ocean. The dam is 178 feet (54 m) tall and 2,920 feet (890 m) long, with a 373-foot (114 m) central concrete section flanked by 2,547 feet (776 m) of embankments. The spillway is located on the concrete section and is controlled by four gates: a 15-by-20-foot (4.6 m × 6.1 m) sluice gates, and three 36-by-30-foot (11.0 m × 9.1 m) tainter gates. The spillway is designed to handle 143,000 cubic feet per second (4,000 m^{3}/s); however, a 1983 study indicated the probable maximum flood at this site is 237,000 cubic feet per second (6,700 m^{3}/s), which could overtop the earthen part of the dam.

The power station is located at the base of the dam and consists of four 56,400 horsepower turbines each powering a generator rated at 35,100 kilowatts (kW). The rated capacity of the plant is 140,400 kW at a flow of 13,300 cubic feet per second (380 m^{3}/s), and the overload capacity is 191,960 kW at a flow of 18,300 cubic feet per second (520 m^{3}/s). Each turbine is supplied with water by a 296-foot (90 m) long penstock affording a gross head of 150 feet (46 m) and a maximum of 158 feet (48 m). In 2009, the Moore Station generated 314,300 megawatt hours (MWh). The average generation of the whole Fifteen Mile Falls project (Moore, Comerford and McIndoe dams combined) was 662,947 MWh for the period 1999–2009.

The reservoir has a total storage capacity of 223,722 acre-feet (275,957,000 m^{3}) and a full surface area of 3,490 acres (1,410 ha). The watershed area above the reservoir, measured at a U.S. Geological Survey stream gauge at Dalton, New Hampshire, is 1,514 square miles (3,920 km^{2}). The mean annual flow of the Connecticut River at this point is 2,962 cubic feet per second (83.9 m^{3}/s), with a monthly high of 7,792 cubic feet per second (220.6 m^{3}/s) in April, and a low of 1,521 cubic feet per second (43.1 m^{3}/s) in August.

== Environmental impacts ==
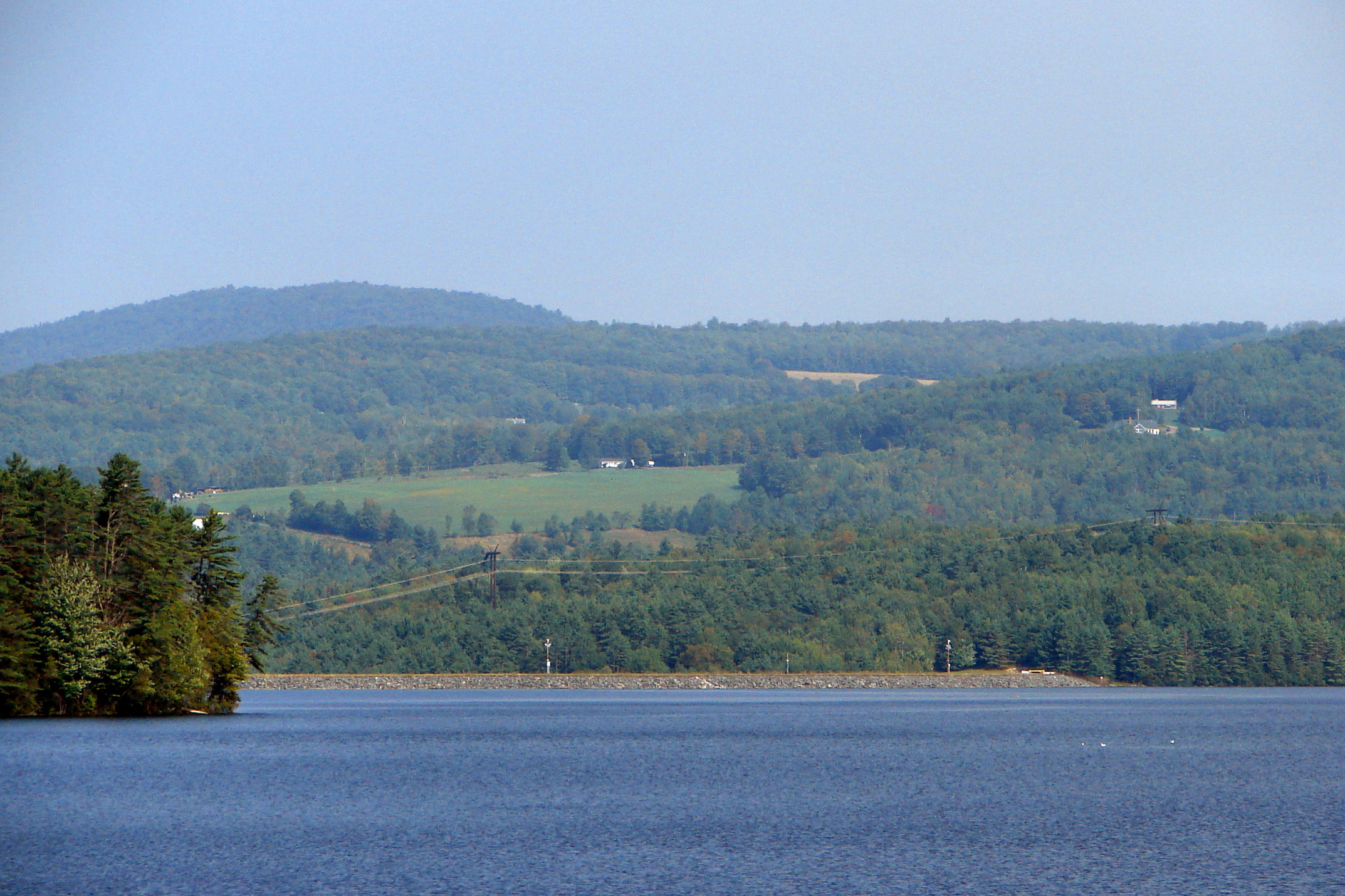
Moore Reservoir

For decades before the dams were built, paper mills and factories along the Connecticut River had been dumping their waste in the river; each spring, floods would flush the contaminants towards the ocean. When Moore Dam was constructed the mill waste was trapped in the reservoir where it settled into the lake bottom sediment creating highly anoxic conditions. For many years, the reservoir was essentially devoid of aquatic life below a depth of 10 feet (3.0 m) or so, although this has slowly improved due to the closing of many industries that originally discharged their waste in the river, and the installation of sewage treatment systems in rural areas. However, fish populations must still be replenished each year by artificial stocking.

Because the downstream McIndoe Dam posed a total barrier to both upstream fish migration in the Connecticut River, neither the Moore or Comerford dams was built with fish passage facilities. The great height of the dam precludes the installation of structures such as fish ladders and has posed an obstacle to restoring salmon runs in the Connecticut River, as the best spawning areas for salmon are located in the headwaters area upstream of the dam.

== Recreation ==
Moore Reservoir is one of the largest "undeveloped" lakes in New England, with few private homes or businesses along its shores. The reservoir area is owned by TransCanada, which permits public access. There are four boat ramps on the New Hampshire side of the reservoir and one directly below Moore Dam. The dam has portage facilities on both the Vermont and New Hampshire sides for use by canoeists and kayakers. Fish species found in the lake include salmon, trout, pike, pickerel, perch, bass and sunfish. Because of the reservoir's great size and catchment area, it is subject to waves and particularly large amounts of floating tree trunks and debris.

== See also ==
- List of dams and reservoirs in New Hampshire
- List of dams and reservoirs in Vermont
