= Ticklenaked Pond =

- Location within Vermont
- Location: Ryegate, Caledonia County, Vermont
- Coordinates: 44°11′18″N 72°05′57″W
- Type: lake
- Basin countries: United States
- Surface elevation: 890 ft (270 m)

Ticklenaked Pond is a lake in Caledonia County, Vermont, in the United States.

"Ticklenaked" is likely a corruption of the Native American (Indian) name. Historian John C. Huden wrote:

It is very doubtful that this hilarious name is of Indian origin; if so, it is possibly a much modified Delaware word meaning "beaver kittens here."

It was also known as Tickenecket and Tickeneck in earlier years.

== See also ==
- List of lakes in Vermont
