= Lyman, New Hampshire =

Town in New Hampshire, United States

- Town
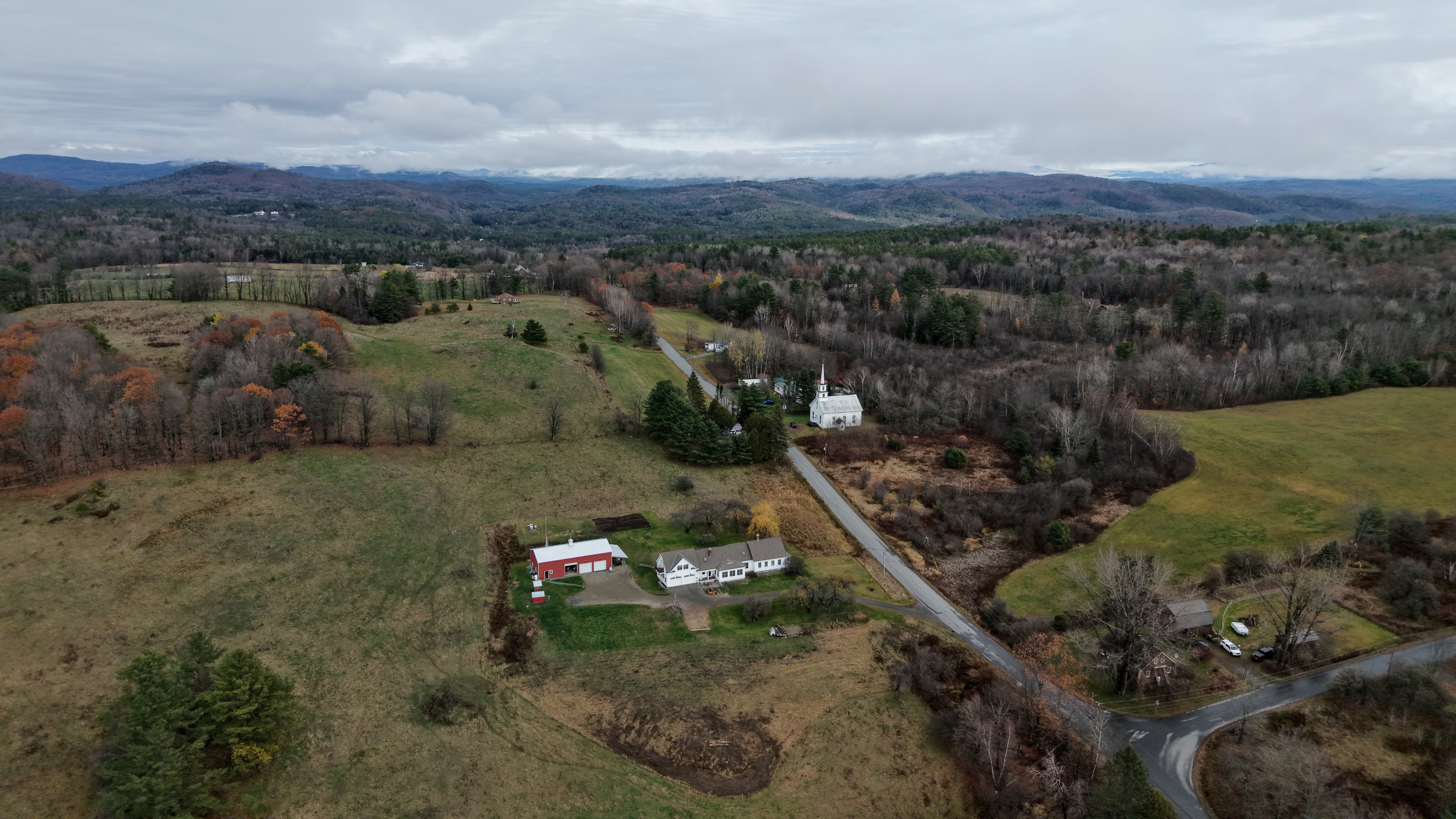
- Lyman, NH, from the southwest

- Seal

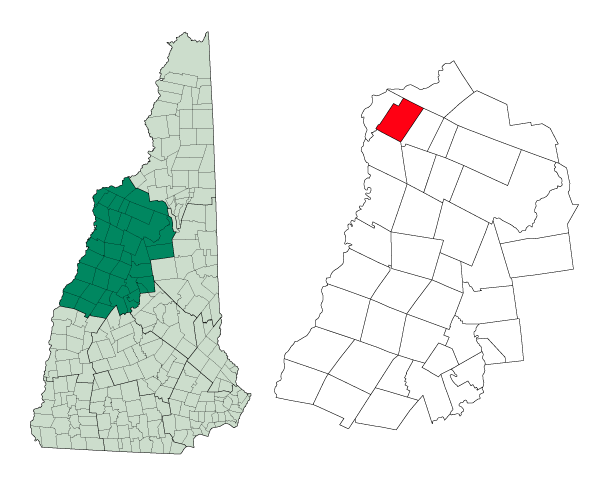
- Location in Grafton County, New Hampshire
- Coordinates: 44°15′56″N 71°56′28″W
- Country: United States
- State: New Hampshire
- County: Grafton
- Incorporated: 1761
- Villages: Tinkerville; Parker Hill

Area
  - Total: 28.7 sq mi (74.3 km^{2})
  - Land: 28.4 sq mi (73.5 km^{2})
  - Water: 0.31 sq mi (0.8 km^{2}) 1.03%
- Elevation: 1,089 ft (332 m)

Population (2020)
  - Total: 585
  - Density: 21/sq mi (8/km^{2})
- Time zone: UTC-5 (Eastern)
  - Summer (DST): UTC-4 (Eastern)
- ZIP code: 03585
- Area code: 603
- FIPS code: 33-44100
- GNIS feature ID: 873653
- Website: www.lymannh.org

Lyman is a town in Grafton County, New Hampshire, United States. The population was 585 at the 2020 census.

== History ==
Lyman, along with Grantham, Lisbon, and eleven Vermont towns, was granted as compensation to General Phineas Lyman, a commander in the French and Indian War. According to the county gazetteer, "It was granted to Daniel Lyman and sixty-three others, November 10, 1761, its name being derived from the fact that eleven of the grantees bore the name of Lyman. The grantees failed to comply with the requirements of their charter, and thus forfeited their grant, but an extension of time was granted them July 20, 1769." Until 1854, Lyman included the land which is now Monroe, New Hampshire, but it was split due to the difficulty in traversing Gardner Mountain which formerly bisected the town. In 1880 it had a population of 665.

== Geography ==
According to the United States Census Bureau, the town has a total area of 28.7 square miles (74.3 km^{2}), of which 28.4 square miles (73.5 km^{2}) are land and 0.31 square miles (0.8 km^{2}) are water, comprising 1.03% of the town. The town is drained by tributaries of the Ammonoosuc River and is part of the Connecticut River watershed. The highest point in town is 2,285 feet (696 m) above sea level, just east of the summit of Signal Mountain, a knob along the ridge of Gardner Mountain, which defines the town's western boundary.

The town's initial grant included land along the Connecticut River. In 1854 the portion of Lyman found west of "Gardner's Mountain" was separately incorporated as Monroe.

== Demographics ==
Historical population
Census	Pop.	Note	%±
1790	202		—
1800	534		164.4%
1810	948		77.5%
1820	1,270		34.0%
1830	1,321		4.0%
1840	1,496		13.2%
1850	1,442		−3.6%
1860	743		−48.5%
1870	658		−11.4%
1880	654		−0.6%
1890	543		−17.0%
1900	426		−21.5%
1910	374		−12.2%
1920	310		−17.1%
1930	299		−3.5%
1940	363		21.4%
1950	241		−33.6%
1960	201		−16.6%
1970	213		6.0%
1980	281		31.9%
1990	388		38.1%
2000	487		25.5%
2010	533		9.4%
2020	585		9.8%
U.S. Decennial Census

As of the census of 2000, there were 487 people, 211 households, and 150 families living in the town. The population density was 17.1 inhabitants per square mile (6.6/km^{2}). There were 280 housing units at an average density of 9.8 per square mile (3.8/km^{2}). The racial makeup of the town was 98.36% White, 0.21% African American, 0.21% Native American, 0.21% Asian, 0.41% from other races, and 0.62% from two or more races. Hispanic or Latino of any race were 0.21% of the population.

There were 211 households, out of which 24.6% had children under the age of 18 living with them, 61.1% were married couples living together, 4.7% had a female householder with no husband present, and 28.9% were non-families. 20.9% of all households were made up of individuals, and 4.3% had someone living alone who was 65 years of age or older. The average household size was 2.31 and the average family size was 2.64.

In the town, the population was spread out, with 19.9% under the age of 18, 4.5% from 18 to 24, 32.0% from 25 to 44, 31.6% from 45 to 64, and 11.9% who were 65 years of age or older. The median age was 42 years. For every 100 females, there were 102.1 males. For every 100 females age 18 and over, there were 105.3 males.

The median income for a household in the town was $46,607, and the median income for a family was $48,365. Males had a median income of $27,500 versus $23,375 for females. The per capita income for the town was $22,332. About 3.5% of families and 6.5% of the population were below the poverty line, including 6.5% of those under age 18 and 6.7% of those age 65 or over.
