= Ball Mountain Dam =

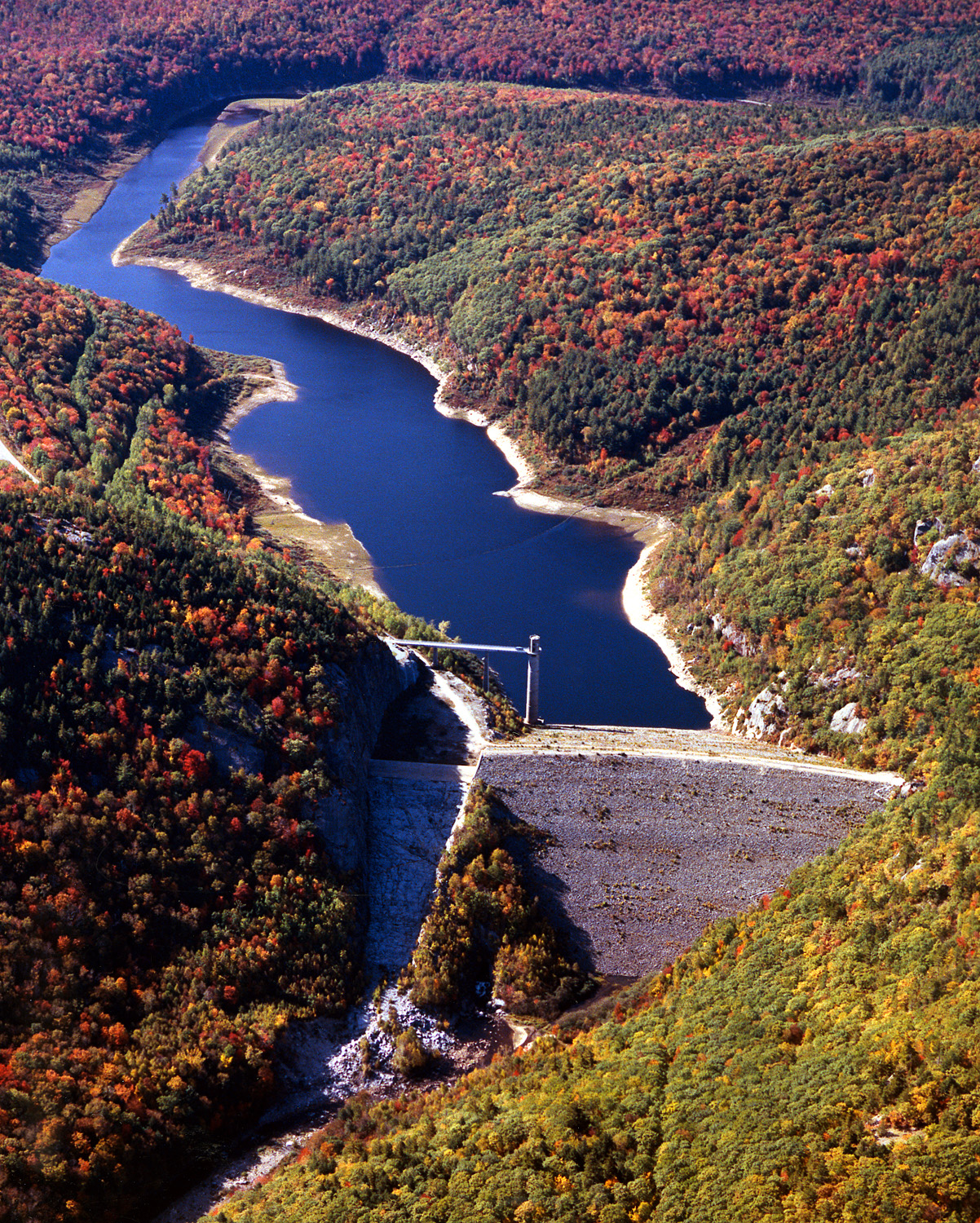
- Ball Mountain Dam and Reservoir
- Interactive map of Ball Mountain Dam
- Country: United States
- Coordinates: 43°7′40.66″N 72°46′25.97″W
- Owner: Army Corps of Engineers
- Operator: Army Corps of Engineers

Dam and spillways
- Height: 247 ft (75 m)
- Length: 915 ft (279 m)

Reservoir
- Creates: Ball Mountain Reservoir
- Total capacity: 52,450 acre⋅ft (65×10^{6} m^{3}) Max; 240 acre⋅ft (300×10^{3} m^{3}) Normal
- Surface area: 20 acres (8.1 ha)
- Maximum water depth: 242 ft (74 m)
- Normal elevation: 869 ft (265 m)

Ball Mountain Dam (National ID # VT00001) is a dam in Jamaica, Windham County, Vermont, in the southeastern part of the state.

The earthen and gravel gravity dam was constructed between 1957 and 1961 by the United States Army Corps of Engineers, with a height of 247 feet (75 m) and a length of 915 feet (279 m) at its crest. It impounds the West River of Vermont for flood control. The dam is owned and operated by the Army Corps of Engineers. The Corps identified safety and seepage problems with the dam in 2009, and has assigned it a Dam Safety Action Class rating of DSAC II, or "Urgent".

The reservoir it creates, Ball Mountain Reservoir, has a normal water surface of 20 acres (8.1 ha), a maximum capacity of 52,450 acre-feet (65 million cubic meters), and a normal capacity of 240 acre⋅ft (300 thousand m^{3}). Recreation includes fishing (for stocked Atlantic salmon, smallmouth bass, and trout), camping at 111 campsites in nearby Winhall and Jamaica, and activities at the adjacent Jamaica State Park. The river between Ball Mountain Lake and downstream Townshend Lake (also operated by the Army Corps of Engineers) is used for white water boating during releases from the Ball Mountain Dam, usually occurring during one weekend in April and one weekend in September.
