= Blackwater Dam =

Dam in New Hampshire, United States

Coordinates: 43°18′58″N 71°43′19″W

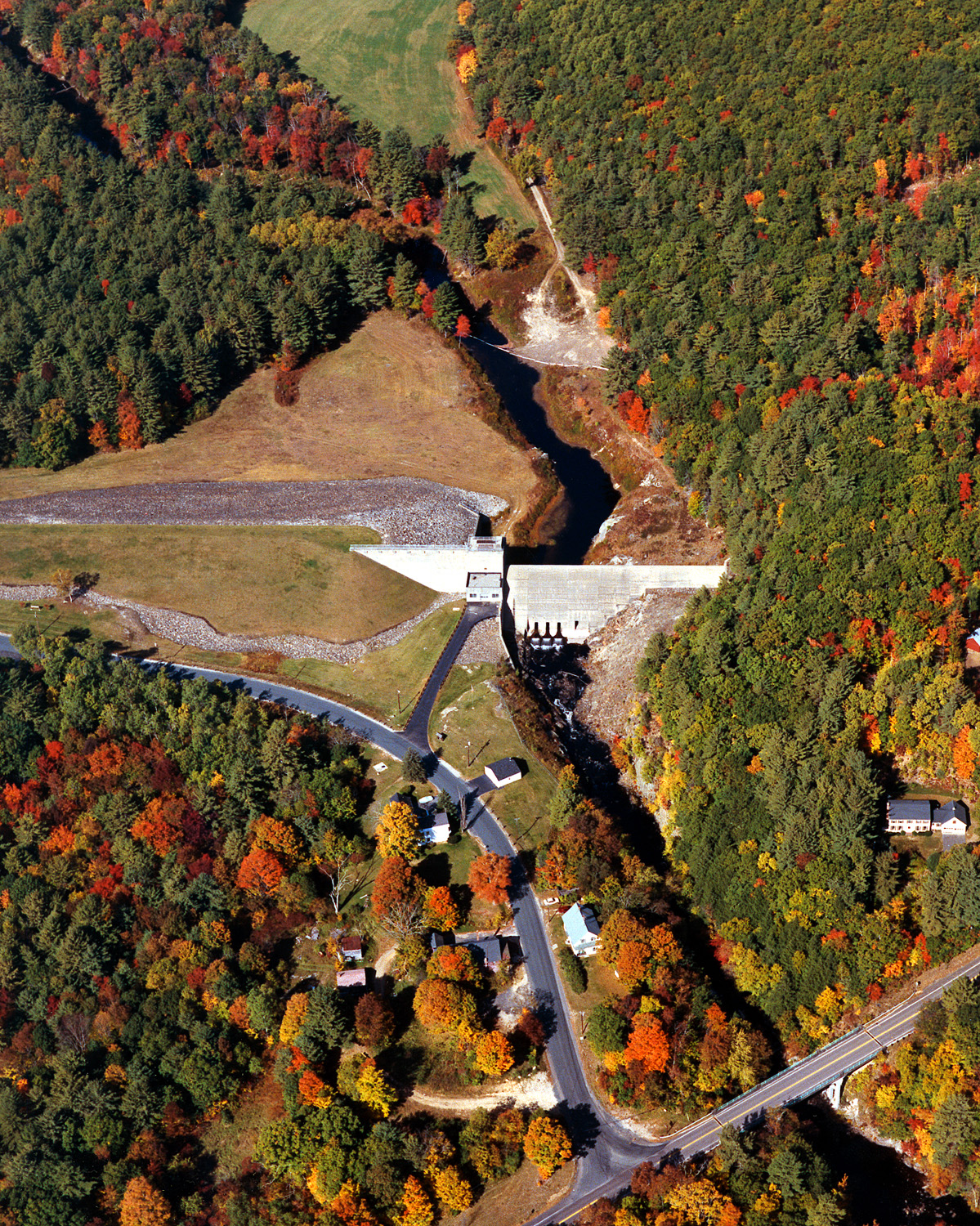
Blackwater Dam and Lake

Blackwater Dam is a dam in the town of Webster, Merrimack County, New Hampshire.

The earthen dam was constructed in 1941 by the United States Army Corps of Engineers with a height of 69 feet (21 m) and 1,150 feet (350 m) long at its crest. It impounds the Blackwater River for flood control and storm water management as one of five related projects in the Merrimack River basin. The dam is owned and operated by the New England District, North Atlantic Division, Army Corps of Engineers.

The seasonal flood-control reservoir created by the dam has a maximum capacity of 93,400 acre-feet (120 million cubic meters), but is normally dry, apart from the normal flow of the Blackwater. The site includes 8 miles (13 km) of river popular for canoeing and kayaking, and fishing for brown and rainbow trout.
