= List of dam removals in New Hampshire =

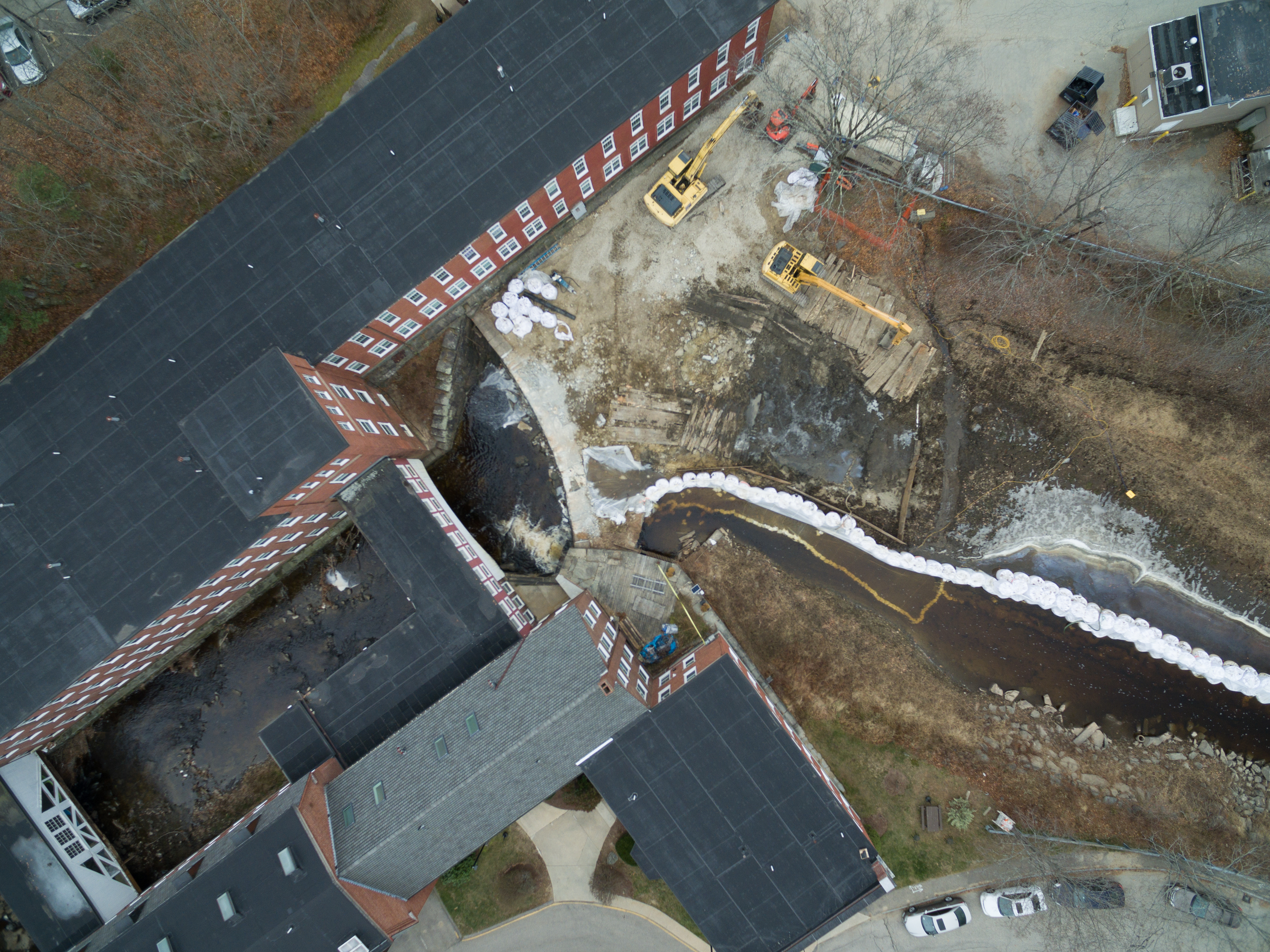
The 2019 removal of the Upper Sawyer Mill Dam from the Bellamy River at Sawyer Woolen Mills in Dover.

This is a list of dams in New Hampshire that have been removed as physical impediments to free-flowing rivers or streams.

== Completed removals ==
Dam	Height	Year removed	Location	Watercourse	Watershed
Judd Brook Dam	5.1 ft (1.6 m)	2017	Easton; 44.1461°N 71.7734°W	Judd Brook	Ammonoosuc River
Pearl Lake Brook Dam		2008	Lisbon; 44.2069°N 71.8919°W	Pearl Lake Brook	Ammonoosuc River
South Branch Gale River Dam	14 ft (4.3 m)	2020	Bethlehem; 44.2423°N 71.6378°W	South Branch Gale River	Ammonoosuc River
Munn Pond Dam	6 ft (1.8 m)	2019	Errol; 44.7354°N 71.1879°W	Tributary to Androscoggin River	Androscoggin River
Homestead Woolen Mills Dam	14 ft (4.3 m)	2010	Swanzey; 42.8714°N 72.3281°W	Ashuelot River	Ashuelot River
McGoldrick Dam		2001	Hinsdale; 42.7877°N 72.4706°W	Ashuelot River	Ashuelot River
Winchester Dam	3 ft (0.91 m)	2002	Winchester; 42.7768°N 72.3834°W	Ashuelot River	Ashuelot River
Ferry Brook Dam	11 ft (3.4 m)	2019	Keene; 42.9755°N 72.2422°W	Ferry Brook	Ashuelot River
Pine Mill Dam	15 ft (4.6 m)	2019	North Haverhill; 44.0891°N 72.0251°W	Clark Brook	Connecticut River
Clark Pond Dam		2018	Haverhill; 44.0899°N 71.9977°W	Clark Brook	Connecticut River
Cold River Dam	7 ft (2.1 m)	2003	Walpole; 43.1302°N 72.4187°W	Cold River	Connecticut River
Lyman Falls Dam Remnant	4 ft (1.2 m)	2022	Columbia; 44.7774°N 71.5956°W	Connecticut River	Connecticut River
Hubner Pond Dam	30 ft (9.1 m)	2019	Chesterfield; 42.8711°N 72.4691°W	Tributary to Hubbard Brook	Connecticut River
Butternut Pond Dam		2013	Grantham; 43.5536°N 72.1308°W	Butternut Brook	Sugar River
Stevens Brook Dam	8 ft (2.4 m)	2011	Claremont; 43.3876°N 72.3513°W	Stevens Brook	Sugar River
West Henniker Dam	10 ft (3.0 m)	2004	Henniker; 43.1654°N 71.8427°W	Contoocook River	Contoocook River
Greene Wildlife Pond Dam (Ainsworth Pond Dam)	13 ft (4.0 m)	2015	Jaffrey; 42.821°N 72.0578°W	Stony Brook	Contoocook River
Beaver Lake Dam	8 ft (2.4 m)	2012	Derry; 42.9016°N 71.2992°W	Beaver Brook	Merrimack River
Berry Brook Reservoir Dam		2013	Pittsfield; 43.2911°N 71.3010°W	Berry Pond Brook	Merrimack River
Maxwell Pond Dam	15 ft (4.6 m)	2009	Manchester; 43.0103°N 71.4791°W	Black Brook	Merrimack River
Heads Pond Dam	9 ft (2.7 m)	2010	Hooksett; 43.1086°N 71.4485°W	Browns Brook	Merrimack River
Jenkins Road McQuade Brook Dam	14 ft (4.3 m)	2012	Bedford; 42.9056°N 71.5237°W	McQuade Brook	Merrimack River
McQuesten Dam #1	4 ft (1.2 m)	2016	Manchester; 42.9694°N 71.4811°W	McQuesten Brook	Merrimack River
McQuesten Dam #2	5 ft (1.5 m)	2016	Manchester; 42.969°N 71.4813°W	McQuesten Brook	Merrimack River
McQuesten Dam #3	2.5 ft (0.76 m)	2016	Manchester; 42.9679°N 71.4812°W	McQuesten Brook	Merrimack River
South Main Street Dam	2.5 ft (0.76 m)	2016	Manchester; 42.9682°N 71.4821°W	McQuesten Brook	Merrimack River
Magazine Street Dam		2014	Bedford; 42.9573°N 71.5426°W	Riddle Brook	Merrimack River
Merrimack Village Dam		2008	Merrimack; 42.8604°N 71.4932°W	Souhegan River	Merrimack River
Anne Jackson Girl Scout Dam	8 ft (2.4 m)	2012	Wilton; 42.8295°N 71.7679°W	Tributary to Souhegan River	Merrimack River
Buck Street Dam West	12 ft (3.7 m)	2011	Pembroke; 43.1595°N 71.4074°W	Suncook River	Merrimack River
Tannery Brook Dam	19 ft (5.8 m)	2015	Boscawen; 43.3421°N 71.6837°W	Tannery Brook	Merrimack River
Boyce Pond Dam/Horseshoe Pond Dam	11 ft (3.4 m)	2014	Fitzwilliam; 42.7533°N 72.1719°W	Tributary to Kemp Brook	Millers River
Upper IPC Dam		2008	Bristol; 43.6068°N 71.7422°W	Newfound River	Pemigewasset River
Bellamy River Dam V	4 ft (1.2 m)	2004	Dover; 43.1763°N 70.8717°W	Bellamy River	Piscataqua River
Lower Sawyer Mill Dam	18 ft (5.5 m)	2018	Dover; 43.1783°N 70.875°W	Bellamy River	Piscataqua River
Upper Sawyer Mill Dam	15 ft (4.6 m)	2019	Dover; 43.179°N 70.8766°W	Bellamy River	Piscataqua River
Union Village Dam	15 ft (4.6 m)	2014	Winchester; 43.4951°N 71.0262°W	Branch River	Piscataqua River
Champlin Pond Dam #1		2005	Rochester; 43.2708°N 70.9313°W	Clark Brook	Piscataqua River
Champlin Pond Dam #2		2005	Rochester; 43.2764°N 70.9317°W	Clark Brook	Piscataqua River
Great Dam	16 ft (4.9 m)	2016	Exeter; 42.9813°N 70.9445°W	Exeter River	Piscataqua River
Bunker Pond Dam	16 ft (4.9 m)	2011	Epping; 43.0403°N 71.1294°W	Lamprey River	Piscataqua River
Rex Tannery Dam		2010	Raymond; 43.0349°N 71.189°W	Tributary to Lamprey River	Piscataqua River
Little Hale Pond Dam	15 ft (4.6 m)	2019	Durham; 43.143°N 70.9213°W	Littlehole Creek	Piscataqua River
Lower Peverly Pond Dam		2021	Newington; 43.0833°N 70.8423°W	Peverly Brook	Piscataqua River
Winnicut River Dam	14 ft (4.3 m)	2009	Greenland; 43.0368°N 70.8477°W	Winnicut River	Piscataqua River
Bearcamp River Dam	20 ft (6.1 m)	2003	South Tamworth; 43.8281°N 71.2987°W	Bearcamp River	Saco River
Badger Pond Dam	18 ft (5.5 m)	2004	Belmont; 43.4521°N 71.4689°W	Tioga River	Winnipesaukee River

== Planned and proposed removals ==
Dam	Expected year	Location	Watercourse	Watershed	Notes
Fiske Mill Dam	2024	Hinsdale; 42.7857°N 72.4814°W	Ashuelot River	Connecticut River	Mill dam built in 1922, converted into a hydroelectric dam in 1986. As of April 2023, The Nature Conservancy was in talks to purchase and remove the dam.
Israel River Dam		Lancaster; 44.4849°N 71.5625°W	Israel River	Connecticut River	
Kimball Brook Dam	2023	Stratford; 44.7418°N 71.5993°W	Kimball Brook	Connecticut River	
Washburn Mill Dam	2023	Colebrook; 44.8766°N 71.3711°W	Mohawk River	Connecticut River	
Brennan Brook/Crochet Mountain Brook Dam	2024	Francestown	Brennan Brook	Merrimack River	
Breeder Pond Dam (Highway Pond Dam)		Franconia; 44.1672°N 71.6804°W	Pemigewasset River	Merrimack River	The project would remove the dam and replace it with a fish ladder. This would allow trout to move freely between Breeder Pond and Profile Lake, with the intention of creating a self-sustaining population and ending the need for stocking.
Stone Pond Dam	2024	Fitzwilliam; 42.7550°N 72.1270°W	Scott Brook	Millers River	
Gonic Dam		Gonic; 43.2735°N 70.9773°W	Cochecho River	Piscataqua River	Rochester City Council voted unanimously to pursue dam removal in 2010. As of 2023, the dams are owned by a developer who wants to remove them before building housing in the area.
Gonic Sawmill Dam		Gonic; 43.2704°N 70.9764°W	Cochecho River	Piscataqua River	Rochester City Council voted unanimously to pursue dam removal in 2010. As of 2023, the dams are owned by a developer who wants to remove them before building housing in the area.
Mill Pond Dam	2024	Durham; 43.1309°N 70.9189°W	Oyster River	Piscataqua River	
Beech River Mill Dam		Ossipee; 43.7507°N 71.1395°W	Beech River	Saco River	In 2020 the Davis Conservation Foundation granted the New Hampshire Chapter of The Nature Conservancy $15,000 toward a dam removal assessment.
