= Waterford, Vermont =

- Town
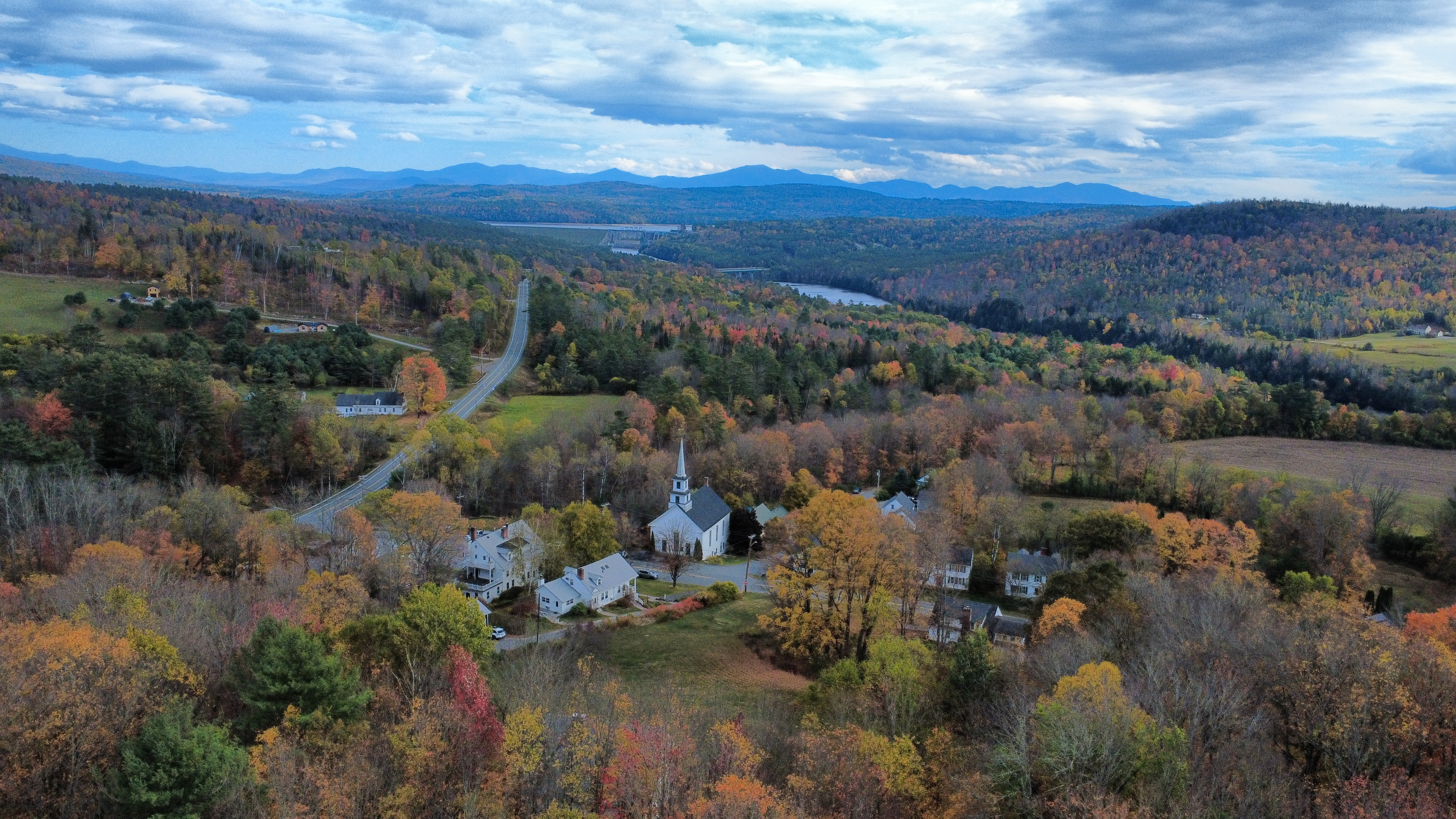
- View of Lower Waterford, VT, from the west

- Seal

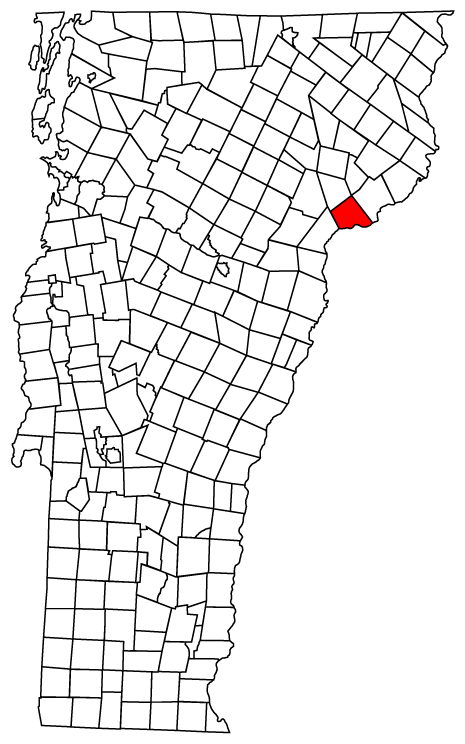
- Waterford, Vermont
- Coordinates: 44°22′40″N 71°57′24″W
- Country: United States
- State: Vermont
- County: Caledonia
- Chartered: November 8, 1780,
- Communities: Lower Waterford; West Waterford

Area
  - Total: 39.7 sq mi (102.9 km^{2})
  - Land: 38.3 sq mi (99.2 km^{2})
  - Water: 1.4 sq mi (3.7 km^{2})
- Elevation: 1,335 ft (407 m)

Population (2020)
  - Total: 1,268
  - Density: 33/sq mi (12.8/km^{2})
- Time zone: UTC−5 (Eastern (EST))
  - Summer (DST): UTC−4 (EDT)
- ZIP Code: 05819
- Area code: 802
- FIPS code: 50-77125
- GNIS feature ID: 1462245
- Website: www.waterfordvt.gov

Waterford is a town in Caledonia County, Vermont, United States. The population was 1,268 at the 2020 census. Located on the Connecticut River, the town has historic interest for its vanished village of Upper Waterford, removed during the construction of power dams on the river between 1928 and 1957. The extensive reservoir formed by Moore Dam in 1956 offers a boat launch, sport fishing, and when the water level is lowered, views of where the road to Upper Waterford existed.

Waterford businesses include farming, construction, and quarries, It has its own "grade school" (grades K-8), one active church and one historic church structure, and a prestigious lodging, the Rabbit Hill Inn, located in what is nicknamed the White Village. The White Village is also of historic and architectural interest, with structures dating to the town's settlement years of 1780 through the 1790s. It gained its present form during the 1930s when dairy entrepreneur John W. Davies bought much of the village at that time and removed many barns and homes, saving the ones that interested him and imposing the exterior colors of white with green shutters.

== History ==
The town was formed by the Vermont charter on November 8, 1780, and was originally called Littleton, but the name was changed to Waterford in 1797. The change prevented confusion with the much larger town of Littleton, New Hampshire, Waterford's neighbor across the Connecticut River. One source suggests town may have been named after Waterford, Ireland, but most refer to the two usable fords that ran across the Connecticut River in that area.

=== Native Americans ===
Waterford's location in the Connecticut River Valley indicates that during the Woodland period, Native Americans occupying and tending the area were Western Abenaki. Archaeological reports emphasize the area's role geographically in connecting to the rest of today's New England, and extensive corn farming by pre-Contact people in the intervale meadows along the river's flood plain. By the time written history of Waterford began in the 1780s, few indications of Native American presence remained, other than the name "Indian Hills" for an area along the Waterford–Barnet line.

=== Charters and grants ===
Like many Vermont towns, Waterford's origins before the American Revolution involve the conflicting colonial New York and New Hampshire grants. In 1770, under the New York grants a charter to John Murray, 4th Earl of Dunmore, included all of what would become Waterford, plus adjoining parts of the future St. Johnsbury and Concord. Hence "Dunmore" is shown as the "town" name on maps from that period. Narrowing this to the area making up the eventual town of Waterford was a charter granted on November 9, 1780, to Benjamin Whipple and 65 others as proprietors of the town of "Littleton," named for investor Moses Little.

=== Early settlers ===
Early settlers are not documented until after this time, and the men's names include James Adams (1783), John and James Wood (1782 or 1785, southwest side of town), Daniel and Nathan Pike ("Upper Waterford"), and Jonathan Hutchinson and Luther Knight (eastern part of town), and Amasa Hastings (West Waterford). One history of the region says that James Adams and his wife Submit won rights to land in Waterford in a singing contest, which James won with a song written by his son Jonathan, called "Brave Wolfe."

=== Town meetinghouses and government ===
Waterford's governance historically took place, and still does, via annual town meetings, starting in 1793. However, a gathering of the 65 proprietors took place at the home of Joseph Woods in 1787, accepting by vote a lot survey and map of the town by surveyor William Chamberlain, which in turn was based on the 1784 boundary survey by Scottish-born surveyor James Whitelaw. The first town meeting after that, in 1793, was at the home of Nehemiah Hadley (located near the Connecticut River where the 1875 Beers map shows H.C. Davison). Five more meetings followed in the same Davison farm area, with subsequent gatherings at other farmhouses, including that of Asa Grow. Efforts to mark the "center" of the town began in 1803 as a possible location for subsequent meetings. In 1818, three structures were built specifically as meetinghouses, as the town developed clusters of population in regions then known as "Waterford" (later Upper Waterford), Lower Waterford, Waterford Hollow, and West Waterford ("Snuff Box Meeting House," soon chosen for subsequent meetings). Later annual meetings were regularly held in the vestry (gathering hall) of the Congregational Church at Lower Waterford, a custom that continued for most years until the town built a central school, which opened in 1952.

Governance was via a board of selectmen. In 1793 the first town officers were chosen: Selectmen Nehemiah Hadley, Daniel Pike, and Peter Sylvester; Town Clerk Selah Howe; Constable Samuel Fletcher, Treasurer Abel Goss; and Listers Levi Aldrich, Levi Goss, and Luther Pike.

== Geography ==
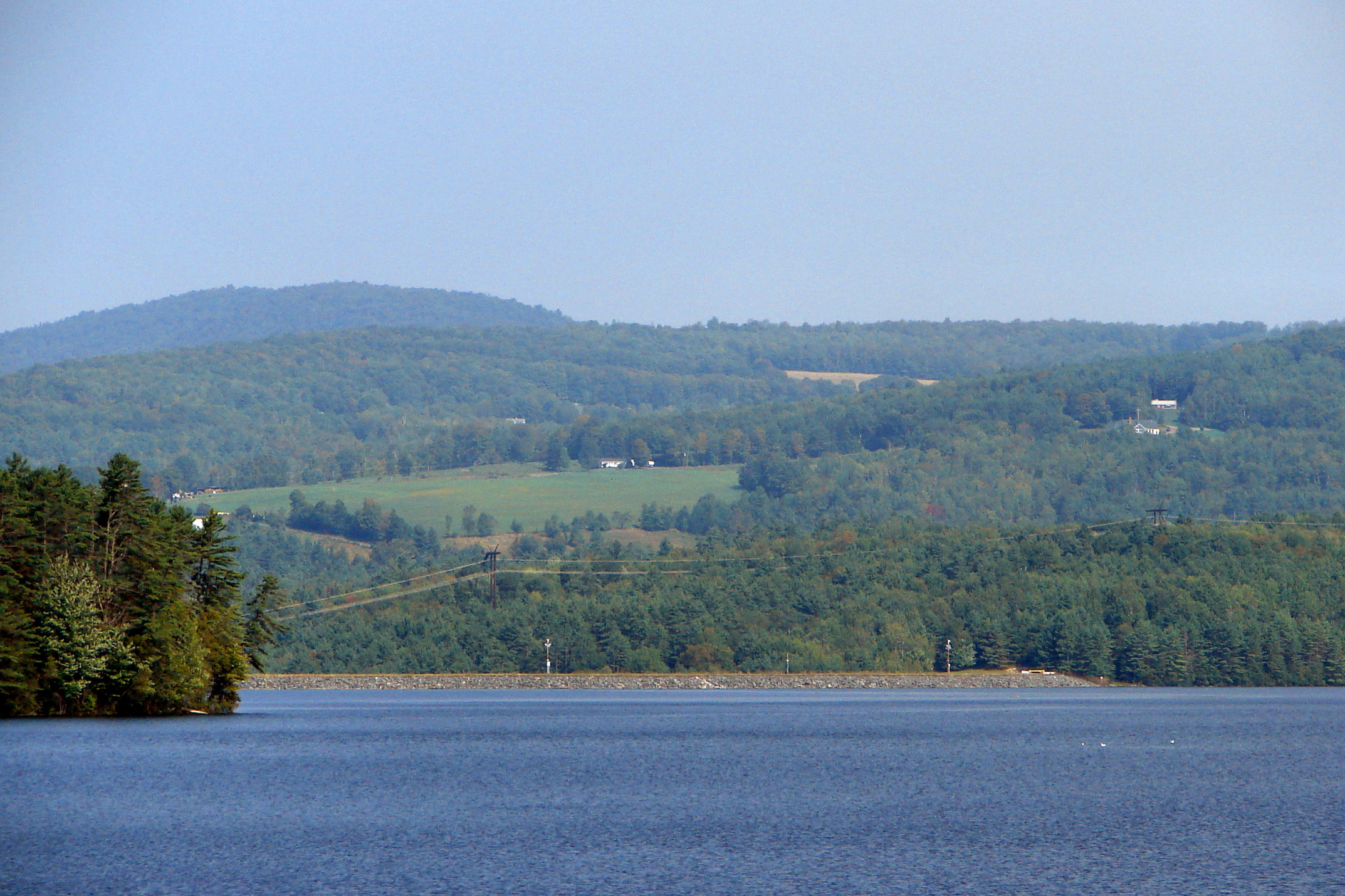
Waterford seen across Moore Reservoir

Waterford is in eastern Caledonia County on the Connecticut River, the eastern border of Vermont. The town is bordered by Barnet to the west, St. Johnsbury to the northwest, Kirby to the north, and Concord, Vermont, to the east. The town of Littleton, New Hampshire, is to the south, across the Connecticut River.

According to the United States Census Bureau, the town of Waterford has an area of 39.7 square miles (102.9 km^{2}), of which 38.3 square miles (99.2 km^{2}) is land and 1.4 square miles (3.7 km^{2}), or 3.59%, is water.

The town is crossed by Interstate 93 and Interstate 91. The northern terminus of I-93, at I-91, is in the western corner of the town, just south of St. Johnsbury. Exit 1 on I-93 serves the northern part of Waterford. Vermont Route 18 is a two-lane highway that parallels I-93.

The highest point in Waterford is the 2,017-foot (615 m) summit of Fuller Hill, near the town's eastern border.

== Demographics ==
Historical population
Census	Pop.	Note	%±
1790	63		—
1800	565		796.8%
1810	1,289		128.1%
1820	1,247		−3.3%
1830	1,358		8.9%
1840	1,388		2.2%
1850	1,412		1.7%
1860	1,171		−17.1%
1870	879		−24.9%
1880	815		−7.3%
1890	734		−9.9%
1900	705		−4.0%
1910	629		−10.8%
1920	574		−8.7%
1930	712		24.0%
1940	498		−30.1%
1950	468		−6.0%
1960	460		−1.7%
1970	586		27.4%
1980	882		50.5%
1990	1,190		34.9%
2000	1,104		−7.2%
2010	1,280		15.9%
2020	1,268		−0.9%
U.S. Decennial Census

At the 2000 census there were 1,104 people in 424 households, including 340 families, in the town. The population density was 28.9 people per square mile (11.2/km^{2}). There were 477 housing units at an average density of 12.5 per square mile (4.8/km^{2}). The racial makeup of the town was 98.55% White, 0.27% Asian, and 1.18% from two or more races. Hispanic or Latino of any race were 0.27%.

Of the 424 households 32.1% had children under the age of 18 living with them, 71.7% were married couples living together, 5.4% had a female householder with no husband present, and 19.8% were non-families. 15.8% of households were one person and 6.1% were one person aged 65 or older. The average household size was 2.60 and the average family size was 2.88.

The age distribution was 24.6% under the age of 18, 4.3% from 18 to 24, 25.7% from 25 to 44, 31.4% from 45 to 64, and 13.9% 65 or older. The median age was 42 years. For every 100 females, there were 104.4 males. For every 100 females age 18 and over, there were 100.5 males.

== Arts and culture ==
The area known as the "White Village" features homes from the 1700s, a church, town library, town office, post office, and the Rabbit Hill Inn.

== Economy ==
=== Personal income ===
The median household income was $50,197 and the median family income was $52,105. Males had a median income of $32,100 versus $23,839 for females. The per capita income for the town was $21,762. About 2.3% of families and 4.2% of the population were below the poverty line, including 3.3% of those under age 18 and 6.3% of those age 65 or over.

Waterford has the highest per capita income of any town or city in the Northeast Kingdom. It ranks 74 out of 282 census areas in Vermont.

== Education ==
Waterford Public Schools are part of the Caledonia Central Supervisory Union. The district serves students in prekindergarten to eighth grade. For high school, the town operates under Public High School Choice, Act 129 of 2012, which allows students to apply to attend any other high school in the state. Under state law, eligible independent schools in the state can also receive public tuition. Nearby independent schools include St. Johnsbury Academy and Lyndon Institute; nearby public schools offering high school classes include Concord School and Danville School.

== Notable people ==
- Amos K. Hadley, Speaker of the New York State Assembly
- Jonathan Ross, Chief Justice of the Vermont Supreme Court and a United States senator from Vermont

== In popular culture ==
The film State and Main is about a film production; it is set in Waterford, although it was actually filmed in Massachusetts.

The books Tall Trees and Tough Men and Spiked Boots describe the men and operations of river-dependent logging along the Connecticut River, researched and written by Robert E. Pike, who had been brought up by his uncle in Upper Waterford, Vermont.
