= North Hartland Dam =

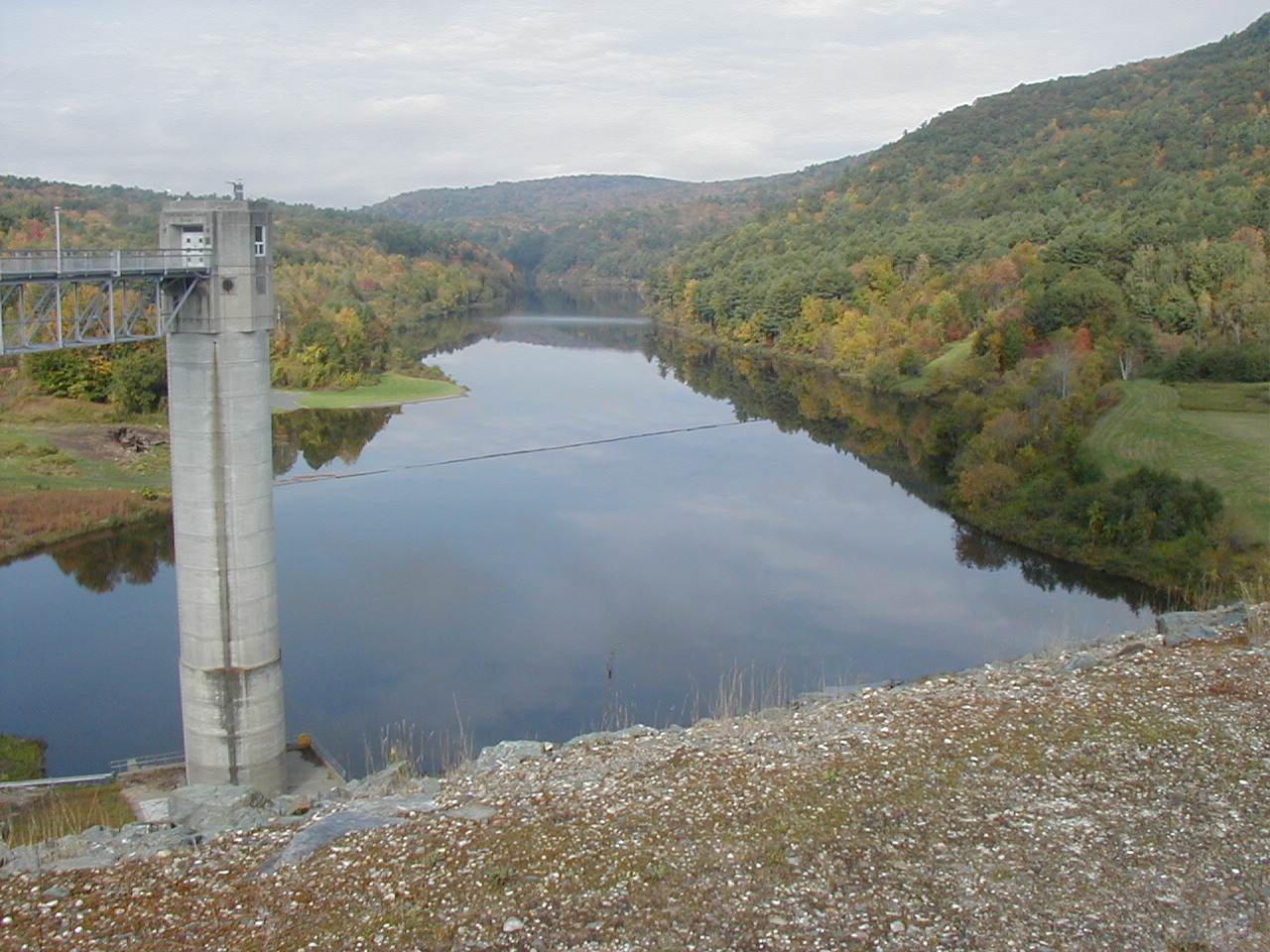
- North Hartland Dam

- Location within Vermont
- Country: United States
- Coordinates: 43°36′17.78″N 72°21′38.02″W
- Purpose: flood control and storm water management
- Owner: U.S. Army Corps of Engineers
- Operator: U.S. Army Corps of Engineers

Dam and spillways
- Height: 182 ft (55 m)
- Length: 1,640 ft (500 m)

Reservoir
- Creates: North Hartland Lake
- Total capacity: 94,600 acre⋅ft (120×10^{6} m^{3})
- Surface area: 215 acres (87 ha)
- Normal elevation: 410 ft (125 m)

North Hartland Dam (National ID # VT00002) is a dam on the Ottauquechee River in Hartland, Windsor County, Vermont.

The earthen dam was constructed between 1958 and 1961 by the United States Army Corps of Engineers, with a height of 182 feet (55 m), and a length of 1,640 feet (500 m) at its crest. It impounds the river for flood control and storm water management. The dam is owned and operated by the New England District, North Atlantic Division, U.S. Army Corps of Engineers.

The riverine reservoir it creates, North Hartland Lake, has a normal water surface of 215 acres (87 ha), a maximum capacity of 94,600 acre-feet (120 million cubic meters), and a much smaller normal capacity of 2,350 acre⋅ft (2.9 million m^{3}). Recreation includes fishing, swimming and boating in the summer, and winter sports such as snowmobiling, cross country skiing, and snowshoeing.
