= Monroe, New Hampshire =

- Town
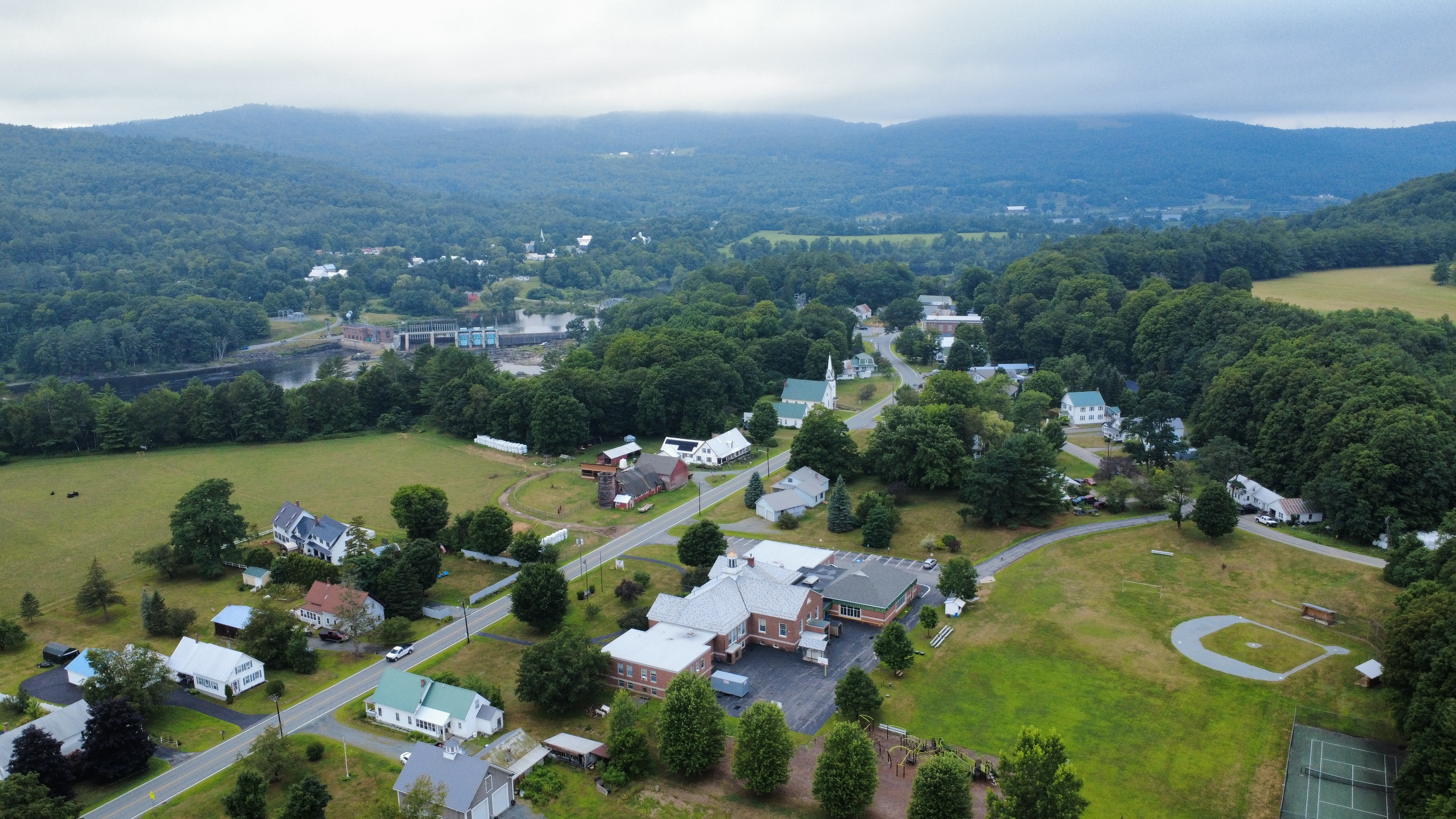
- View of Monroe, NH, from the south

- Seal

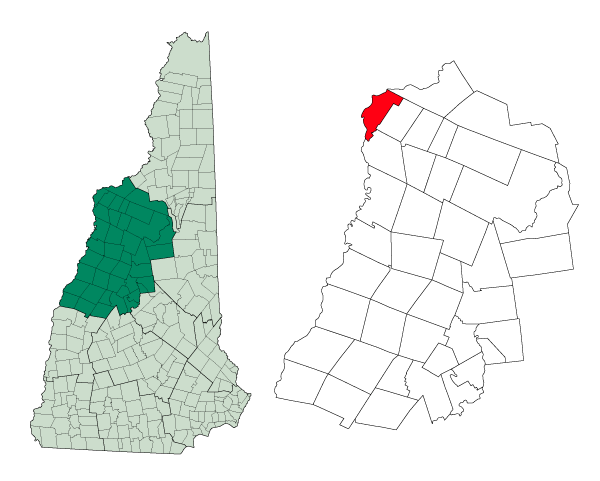
- Location in Grafton County, New Hampshire
- Coordinates: 44°17′04″N 72°00′17″W
- Country: United States
- State: New Hampshire
- County: Grafton
- Incorporated: 1854

Area
  - Total: 23.8 sq mi (61.7 km^{2})
  - Land: 22.3 sq mi (57.8 km^{2})
  - Water: 1.5 sq mi (3.9 km^{2}) 6.26%
- Elevation: 1,109 ft (338 m)

Population (2020)
  - Total: 864
  - Density: 39/sq mi (14.9/km^{2})
- Time zone: UTC-5 (Eastern)
  - Summer (DST): UTC-4 (Eastern)
- ZIP code: 03771
- Area code: 603
- FIPS code: 33-48980
- GNIS feature ID: 873669
- Website: www.monroenh.org

Monroe is a town in Grafton County, New Hampshire, United States. The population was 864 at the 2020 census, up from 788 at the 2010 census. The town is located along the Connecticut River, across from Barnet, Vermont. It was originally chartered as part of Lyman.

== History ==
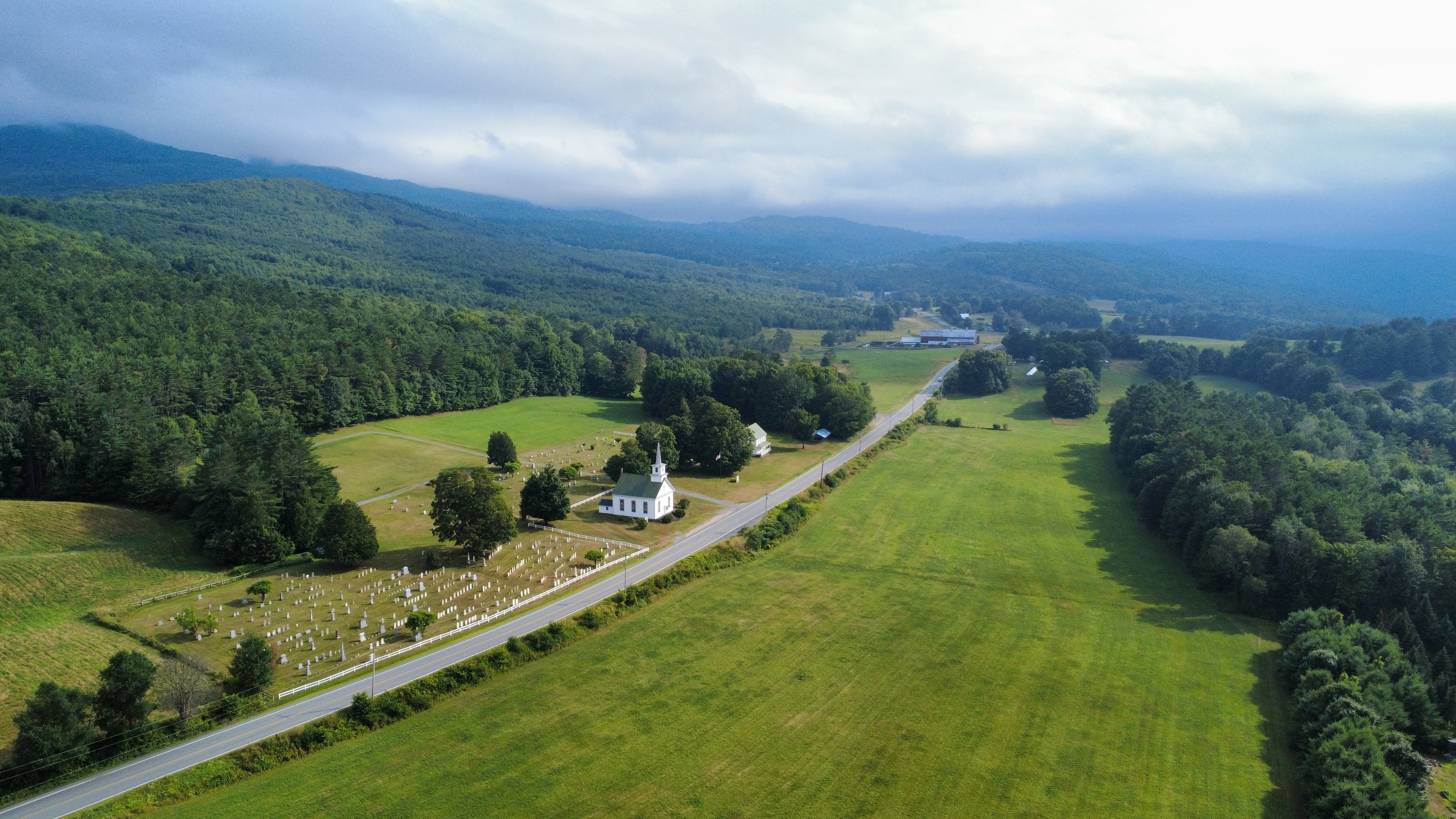
View over northern Monroe, NH, looking south

In 1762, colonial Governor John Wentworth issued a grant ("Number 11") to 64 persons obligated to clear, farm and settle one tenth of each of their parcels or forfeit the grant. Only two made the attempt, but the charter was extended, in 1769, for another five years. Eleven of the original 64 grantees were named Lyman. In that same year, Wentworth also granted to one Colonel John Hurd of Portsmouth, New Hampshire, part of the land which is today within the bounds of Monroe. The grant was named "Hurd's Location" and included five small islands in the Connecticut River, known as "Deer Islands", and a parcel of land from below the present Village Bridge to the foot of Fifteen Mile Falls.

In addition to Hurd's Location and the governor's 500 acres (2.0 km^{2}), there were 23 lots of the 64 portions of Lyman located in "West Lyman", or the "Lyman Plain", now Monroe, making up less than 7,500 acres (30 km^{2}) of the present area. portion of Bath, to the south, was annexed in 1897.

The first known settlers on the "West Lyman" portion of Lyman were John Hyndman (also, "John Hinman"), with his wife and son, who settled on the largest of the Deer Islands (below the present-day Barnet Bridge) in 1784 and built a log cabin. When Colonel Hurd learned of Hyndman's structure, he sued to have him evicted. A Barnet benefactor settled the controversy by purchasing the title from Hurd.

The first permanent settlers also came in the 1780s. They were the Olmstead families: Joseph, Timothy, and Israel, their wives and children. The first native son, Ethan Smith, was born in a cabin on the Canaan Road (over the Gardner Mountain to Lyman) in 1784.

Because of the difficulty traversing the steep "Gardner's Mountain" running north to south through the original Lyman grant of 1761, the settlers of the western portion had different priorities and needs than the rest of Lyman to the east. Monroe was incorporated as a separate town in 1854. After appropriate consideration, it was named after President James Monroe. In 1860, Monroe had 619 residents. By 1880, the population had decreased to 504.

"Captain" Phillip Paddleford, a Revolutionary War soldier, settled in 1790, and built Monroe's first sawmill and gristmill on what is now called Smith Brook. Peter Paddleford (1785–1859) was the inventor of the wooden Paddleford Truss for covered bridges. Many of his original bridges still stand. He was the builder of the "third Lyman Bridge" from Monroe to McIndoes, Vermont, in 1833, after the 1826 floods had taken out all bridges on the Connecticut River. It was a covered bridge of pine, over 300 feet (91 m) long, and stood for over 96 years, making it one of the oldest on the river.

== Geology ==
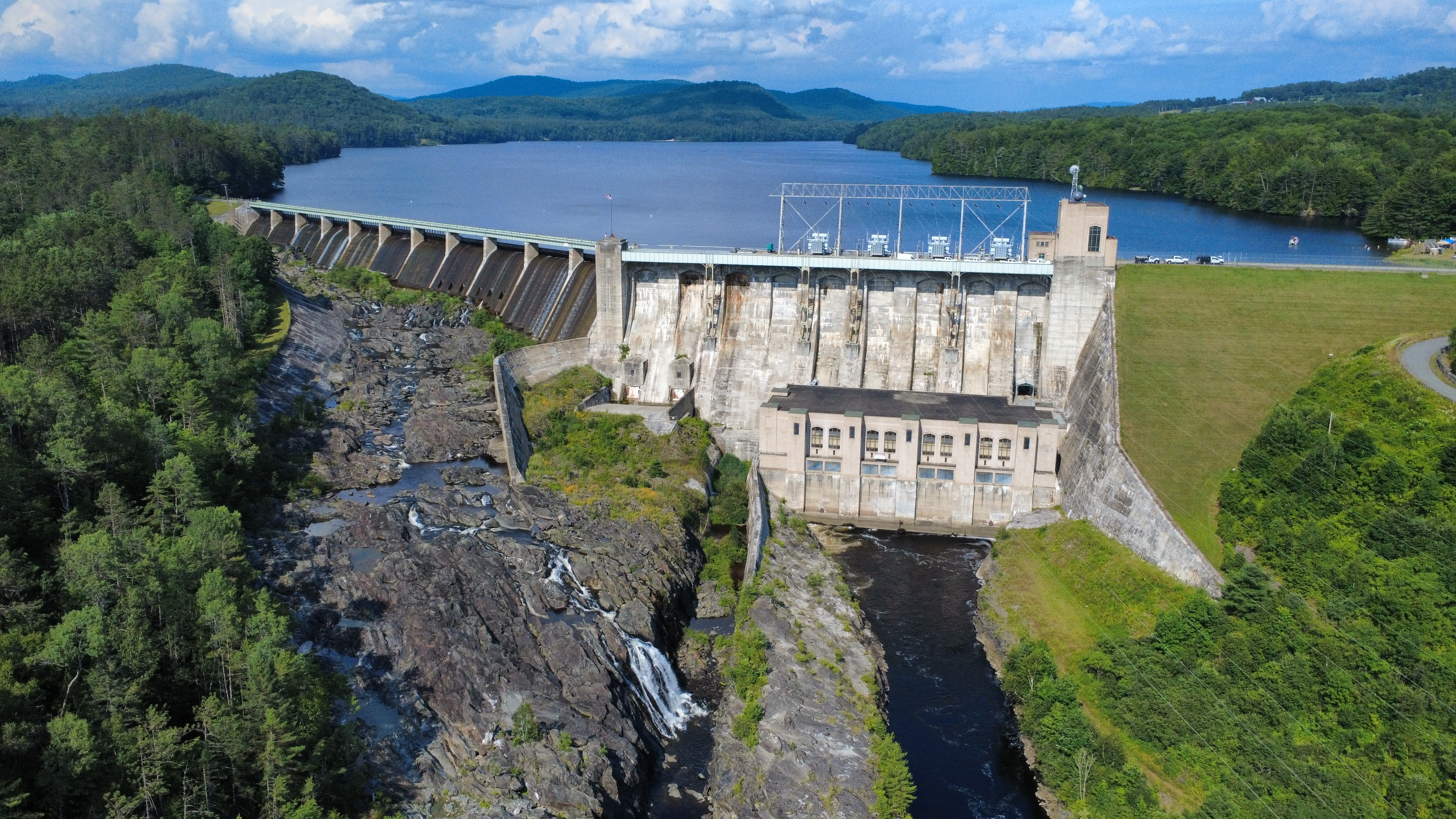
View looking upstream over Comerford Dam, New Hampshire

Parts of the Ammonoosuc Gold Fields, which have never been successfully mined, are in Monroe. "Within the limits of the town are the narrows, at which place the Connecticut River is only five rods in width, being confined by walls of slate." Several copper mines were excavated along the "Back Road" (now named Coppermine Road), and many parcels continue to have separate mining rights.

Test borings and surface samples during the 1928–1930 construction of Frank D. Comerford Dam, in the Connecticut River, provided new geologic information regarding de-glaciation of the White Mountains, and became the namesake of the "Comerford Suite". The dam, located on what was once called "Fifteen Mile Falls", is now used for flood control, irrigation and generation of electrical power for transmission to New England states. At the time of its construction, it was the largest "retaining wall" in the United States, representing more than 90,000 cubic yards (69,000 m^{3}) of concrete.

Prior to the establishment of a series of dams, the river dropped 367 feet (112 m) in 15 miles (24 km), from Dalton to Bath.

== Geography ==
According to the United States Census Bureau, the town has a total area of 23.8 square miles (61.7 km^{2}), of which 22.3 square miles (57.8 km^{2}) are land and 1.5 square miles (3.9 km^{2}) are water, comprising 6.26% of the town. The town is bounded by the Connecticut River (which is also the state boundary with Vermont) to its west and the long ridge of Gardner Mountain to the east. Signal Mountain, a knob on Gardner Mountain, is the highest point in Monroe, measuring 2,299 feet (701 m) above sea level. It has long been a major surveying reference point for maps and plats of the area between Mount Mansfield and Mount Washington.

NH 135 runs through the town, substantially parallel to the river, linking Monroe to Littleton to the north and Bath to the south. A northwestern segment of Bath was annexed to Monroe in 1895, stimulated by its shared geography with Monroe.

== Demographics ==
Historical population
Census	Pop.	Note	%±
1860	619		—
1870	532		−14.1%
1880	504		−5.3%
1890	478		−5.2%
1900	545		14.0%
1910	429		−21.3%
1920	356		−17.0%
1930	457		28.4%
1940	430		−5.9%
1950	410		−4.7%
1960	421		2.7%
1970	385		−8.6%
1980	619		60.8%
1990	746		20.5%
2000	759		1.7%
2010	788		3.8%
2020	864		9.6%
U.S. Decennial Census

As of the census of 2000, there were 759 people, 310 households, and 231 families residing in the town. The population density was 33.9 inhabitants per square mile (13.1/km^{2}). There were 333 housing units at an average density of 14.9 per square mile (5.8/km^{2}). The racial makeup of the town was 97.63% White, 0.00% African American, 0.00% Native American, 0.13% Asian, 0.00% Pacific Islander, 0.00% from other races, and 2.24% from two or more races. 0.00% of the population were Hispanic or Latino of any race.

There were 310 households, out of which 27.7% had children under the age of 18 living with them, 65.8% were married couples living together, 5.5% had a female householder with no husband present, and 25.2% were non-families. 21.0% of all households were made up of individuals, and 11.6% had someone living alone who was 65 years of age or older. The average household size was 2.45 and the average family size was 2.82.

In the town, the population was spread out, with 22.5% under the age of 18, 5.9% from 18 to 24, 24.1% from 25 to 44, 28.2% from 45 to 64, and 19.2% who were 65 years of age or older. The median age was 44 years. For every 100 females, there were 100.3 males. For every 100 females age 18 and over, there were 101.4 males.

Median resident age: 43.9 years. Median house value: $98,700. 22% of Monroe residents age 25 and older have a bachelor's or advanced college degree.

The median income for a household in the town was $42,411, and the median income for a family was $46,346. Males had a median income of $35,125 versus $26,458 for females. The per capita income for the town was $19,730. 1.6% of the population and 0.9% of families were below the poverty line. 0.0% of those under the age of 18 and 2.1% of those 65 and older were living below the poverty line.

== Notable person ==
- Jean Harris (1923–2012), defendant in a high-profile murder case lived in Monroe
