= Frank D. Comerford Dam =

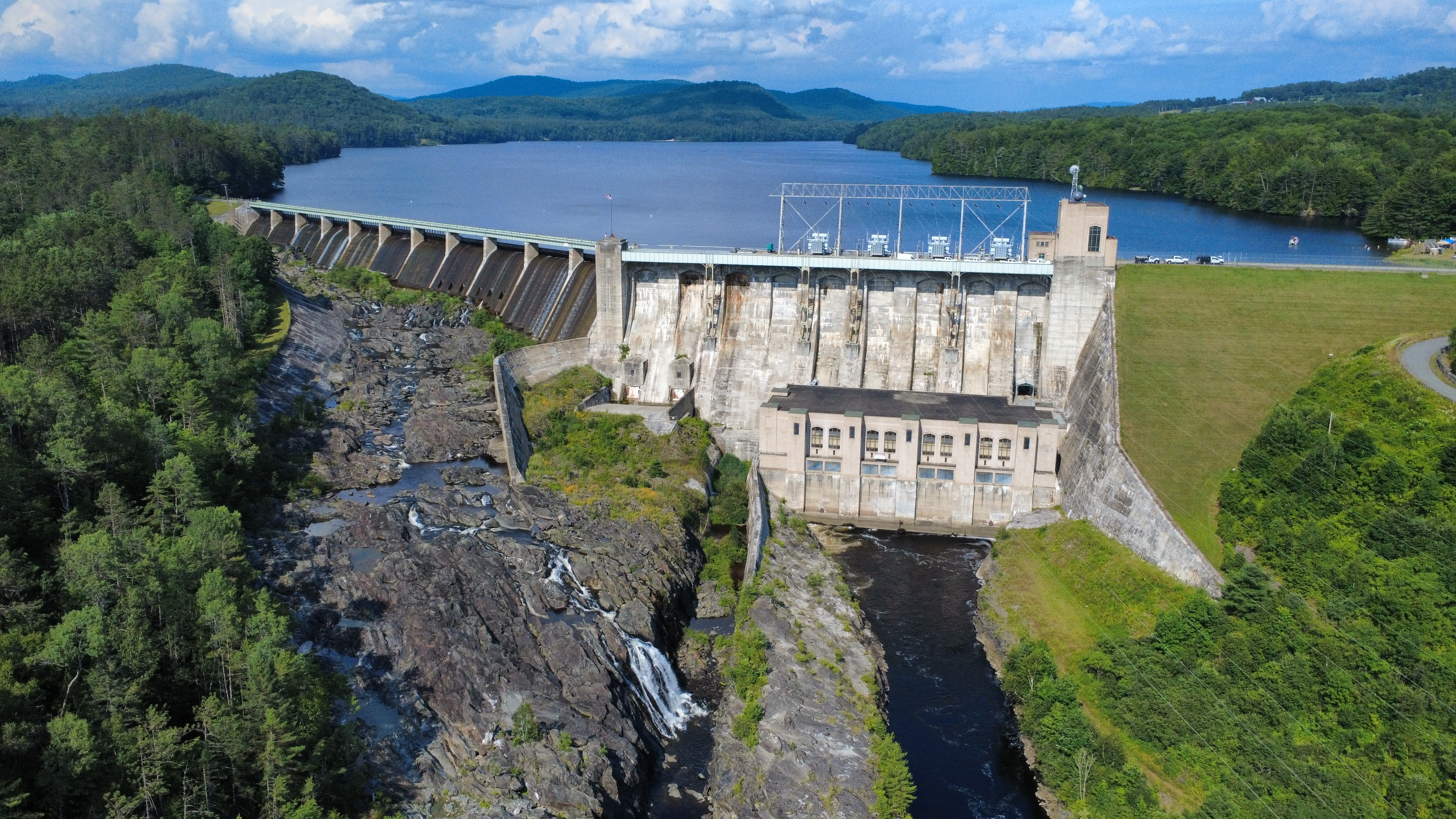
- View looking upstream over Comerford Dam, New Hampshire
- Official name: Frank D. Comerford Dam
- Country: United States
- Location: Monroe, New Hampshire; Barnet, Vermont
- Coordinates: 44°19′31″N 72°0′03″W
- Purpose: Power
- Status: Operational
- Construction began: 1928
- Opening date: 1930
- Owner(s): Hydro-Québec

Dam and spillways
- Type of dam: Gravity dam
- Impounds: Connecticut River
- Height: 170 feet (52 m)
- Length: 2,253 feet (687 m)
- Elevation at crest: 647 feet (197 m)
- Spillways: 1

Reservoir
- Creates: Comerford Reservoir
- 140 Megawatts capacity at 13,300 cfs discharge

Frank D. Comerford Dam is an International Style concrete dam in the Fifteen Mile Falls of the Connecticut River, on the border between the U.S. states of New Hampshire and Vermont. The dam is near Monroe, New Hampshire and Barnet, Vermont. Construction began in 1928 and was completed in 1931. The dam and the power plant were acquired by a subsidiary of Hydro-Québec from Great River Hydro, LLC, in October 2022.

Comerford Reservoir is the reservoir created behind the dam, named after Frank D. Comerford, president of the Connecticut River Power Company and the New England Power Company.

Hydroelectric power plants have the ability to vary the amount of power generated, depending on the demand. Steam turbine power plants are not as easily "throttled" because of the amount of thermodynamic inertia contained in their systems.

== Geology ==
In what would become the Connecticut River, running water wore out a rocky gorge 40 feet (12 m) to 100 feet (30 m) deep in pre-glacial days. The result was a gentle gradient, 10 feet (3 m) to the 1 mile (1.6 km). The drop is 320 feet (98 m) over 15 miles (24 km). The area was called "Fifteen Mile Falls."

== History ==
On September 30, 1930, President Herbert Hoover remotely initiated the generation of electricity from Comerford Dam, then New England's largest single hydroelectric development. This was the first in a series, harnessing hydroelectric power in the United States in the 1930s. The power was sent 126 miles (203 km) for use in Massachusetts. At the time of its construction, it was the largest "retaining wall" in the United States, representing more than 90,000 cubic yards (69,000 m^{3}) of concrete.

In 2005, USGen New England sold the dam to TransCanada Hydro Northeast Inc. The dam and the power plant were acquired by Great River Hydro, LLC, in April 2017 and by Hydro-Québec in October 2022.

=== Construction ===
A camp was constructed in East Barnet, Vermont, in 1928 for 1,500 workers. The camp contained its own housing, commissary, theater (which substituted as a church on Sunday), and a hospital. It had its own hockey and basketball teams. 120 people prepared and served meals. 1,300 men worked the day shift from 7:00 to 6:00 with one hour off for lunch. 300 men worked the night shift.

Construction materials were supplied on a special 3-mile (4.8 km) railroad track built to the site.

== Major structures ==
The reservoir has a capacity of 32,270 acre feet and has a full supply level of 647 feet (197 m) above mean sea level. The gravity dam is 2,253 feet (687 m) long and made of concrete and earth. Four steel penstocks feed water to the powerhouse, where four Francis turbines rated 54,200 horsepower each produce a combined capacity of 140 megawatts at a combined discharge flow of 13,300 cubic feet per second. The remaining structure is an 850-foot-long (260 m) spillway which is used to discharge water excess to generating requirements.

== See also ==
- McIndoes Reservoir
- Moore Dam
