= McIndoes Reservoir =

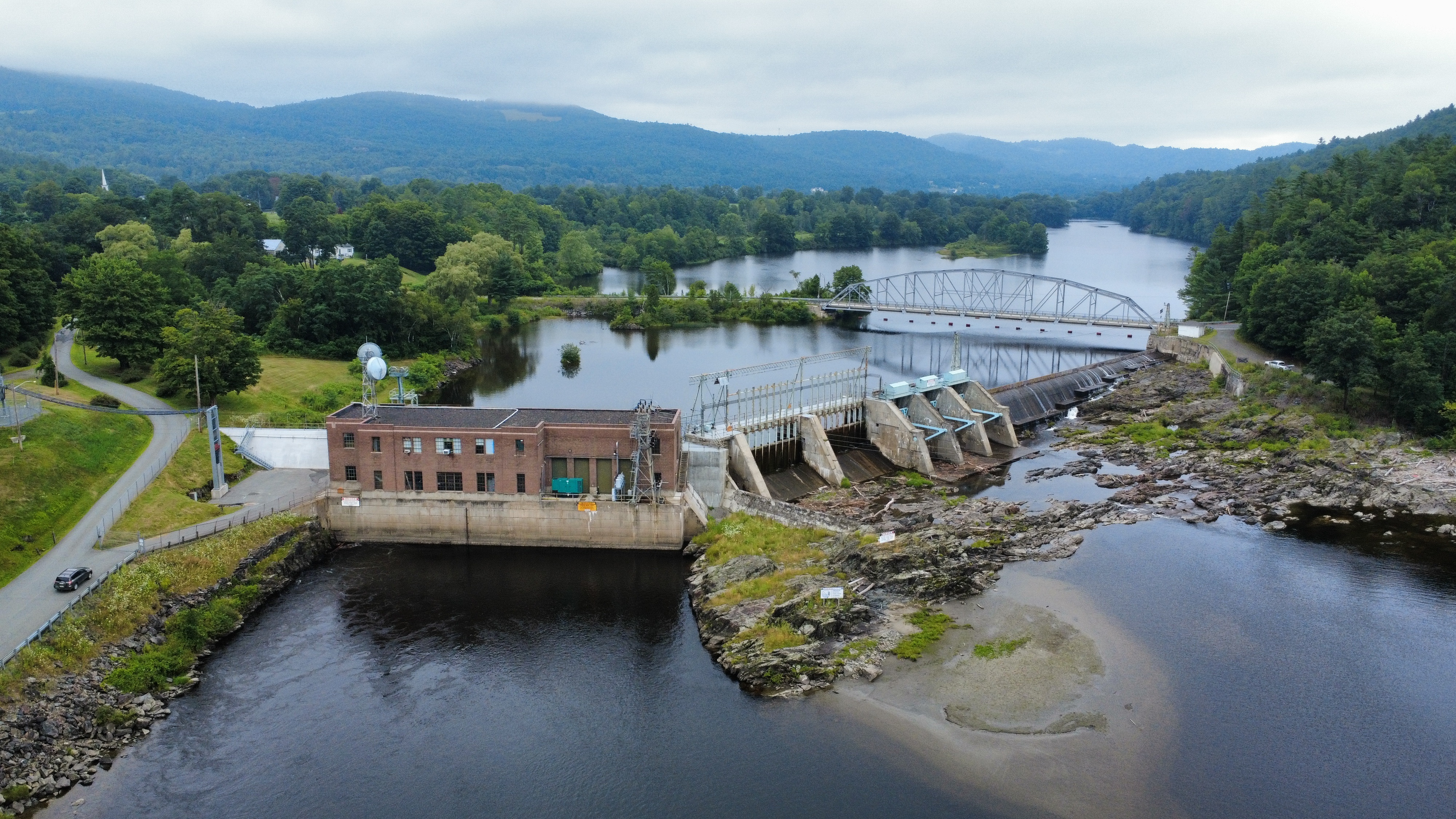
- McIndoes Reservoir, NH

- Location within New Hampshire Location within Vermont Location within the United States
- Location: Monroe, Grafton County, New Hampshire / Barnet, Caledonia County, Vermont
- Coordinates: 44°15′36″N 72°3′36″W
- Type: Reservoir
- Primary inflows: Connecticut River
- Primary outflows: Connecticut River
- Basin countries: United States
- Max. length: 5.3 miles (8.5 km)
- Max. width: 0.4 miles (0.64 km)
- Surface area: 545 acres (2.21 km^{2})
- Surface elevation: 136 m (446 ft)
- Islands: Stevens Island; 2 unnamed
- Settlements: Monroe, New Hampshire; Barnet, Vermont (village of McIndoe Falls)

McIndoes Reservoir is a 545-acre (2.21 km^{2}) impoundment on the Connecticut River on the boundary between Vermont and New Hampshire in northern New England. The dam forming the reservoir lies between the communities of McIndoe Falls, Vermont, and Monroe, New Hampshire. Monroe Road (Frazier Road) crosses the reservoir 600 feet (180 m) north (upstream) of the dam, leading west 0.2 miles (0.3 km) to U.S. Route 5 in McIndoe Falls and east the same distance to New Hampshire Route 135 in the center of Monroe. The next river crossing upstream is a bridge carrying the North Monroe Road (Barnet Road), 1.5 miles (2.4 km) north of McIndoe Falls.

McIndoe Falls Dam creating the reservoir was built in 1931 as a project of the New England Electric System, along with the nearby Frank D. Comerford Dam. The McIndoes Station power plant has a capacity of 11 megawatts. Both dams are now owned and operated by TransCanada Corporation.

== See also ==
- List of lakes in New Hampshire
- List of lakes in Vermont
