= Townshend Dam =

Dam in Townshend, Vermont

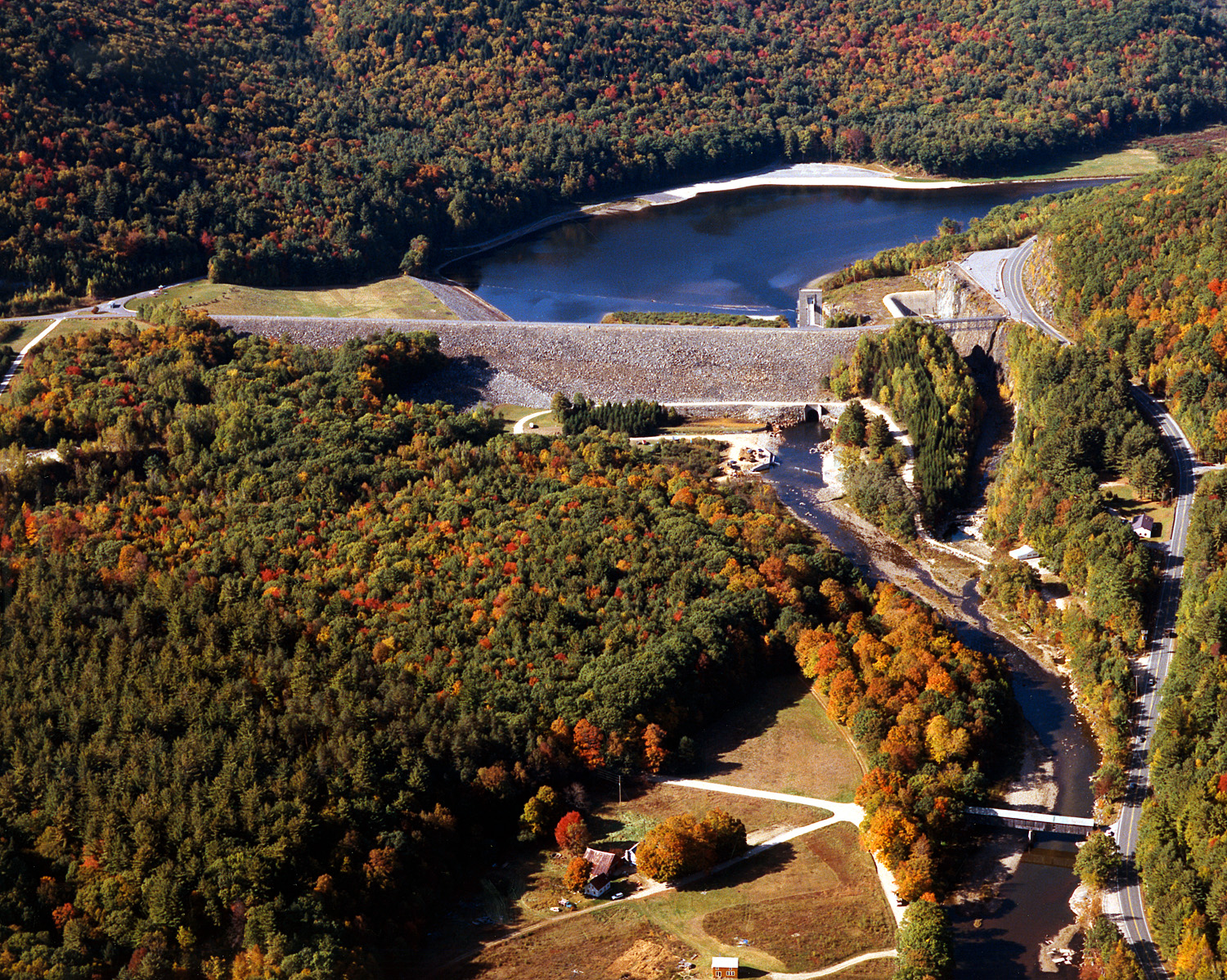
- Townshend Lake, Vermont
- Interactive map of Townshend Dam
- Country: United States
- Coordinates: 43°3′9.58″N 72°42′9.68″W

Dam and spillways
- Height (foundation): 126 feet (38 m)
- Length: 1,700 feet (520 m)

Reservoir
- Total capacity: 800 acre-feet (987,000 m^{3})
- Surface area: 95 acres (38 ha)

Townshend Dam is a dam in Townshend, Windham County, Vermont.

The earthen dam was constructed in 1961 by the United States Army Corps of Engineers with a height of 126 feet and a length of 1700 feet at its crest. It impounds Vermont's West River for flood control and seasonal storm water management. The dam is owned and operated by the Corps of Engineers. Its National ID number is VT00004.

The riverine reservoir it creates, Townshend Lake, has a normal water surface of 95 acres, a maximum storage capacity of 54,300 acre-feet, and a normal storage capacity of 800 acre-feet. Recreation includes fishing (for smallmouth bass, brown and rainbow trout), boating and hiking, along with facilities at the nearby Townshend State Park.
