= Moore Reservoir =

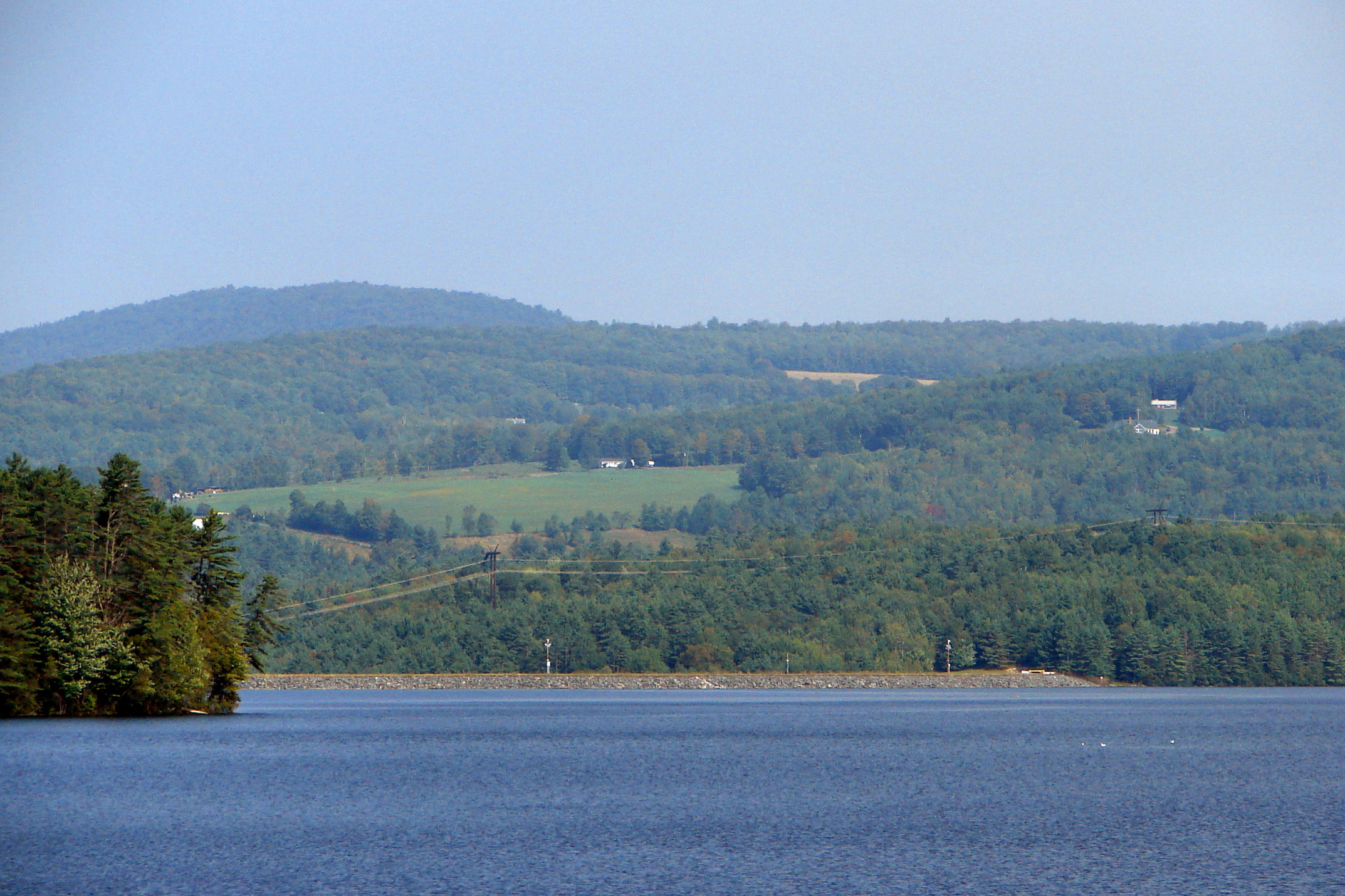

- Location within New Hampshire Location within Vermont Location within the United States
- Location: Grafton County and Coos County, New Hampshire; Caledonia County and Essex County, Vermont
- Coordinates: 44°20′6″N 71°52′32″W
- Type: Reservoir
- Primary inflows: Connecticut River
- Primary outflows: Connecticut River
- Basin countries: United States
- Max. length: 9.8 mi (15.8 km)
- Max. width: 2.0 mi (3.2 km)
- Surface area: 3,181 acres (12.87 km^{2})
- Average depth: 60 feet (18 m)
- Max. depth: 120 feet (37 m)
- Surface elevation: 806 ft (246 m)
- Settlements: Littleton and Dalton, New Hampshire; Waterford and Concord, Vermont

Moore Reservoir is an impoundment on the Connecticut River located in the communities of Littleton, New Hampshire; Dalton, New Hampshire; Waterford, Vermont; and Concord, Vermont. It occupies approximately 3,181 acres (12.87 km^{2}).

It was created by the completion of the Moore Dam in 1956, which caused the flooding of several villages, including Pattenville, New Hampshire, and old Waterford, Vermont. Moore Dam is now owned and operated by TransCanada Corporation. With a capacity of 192 megawatts, it is the most productive of TransCanada's thirteen hydroelectric facilities in New England.

The lake is classified as a cold- and warmwater fishery, with observed species including brook trout, rainbow trout, brown trout, smallmouth and largemouth bass, chain pickerel, bullpout, northern pike, and rock bass.

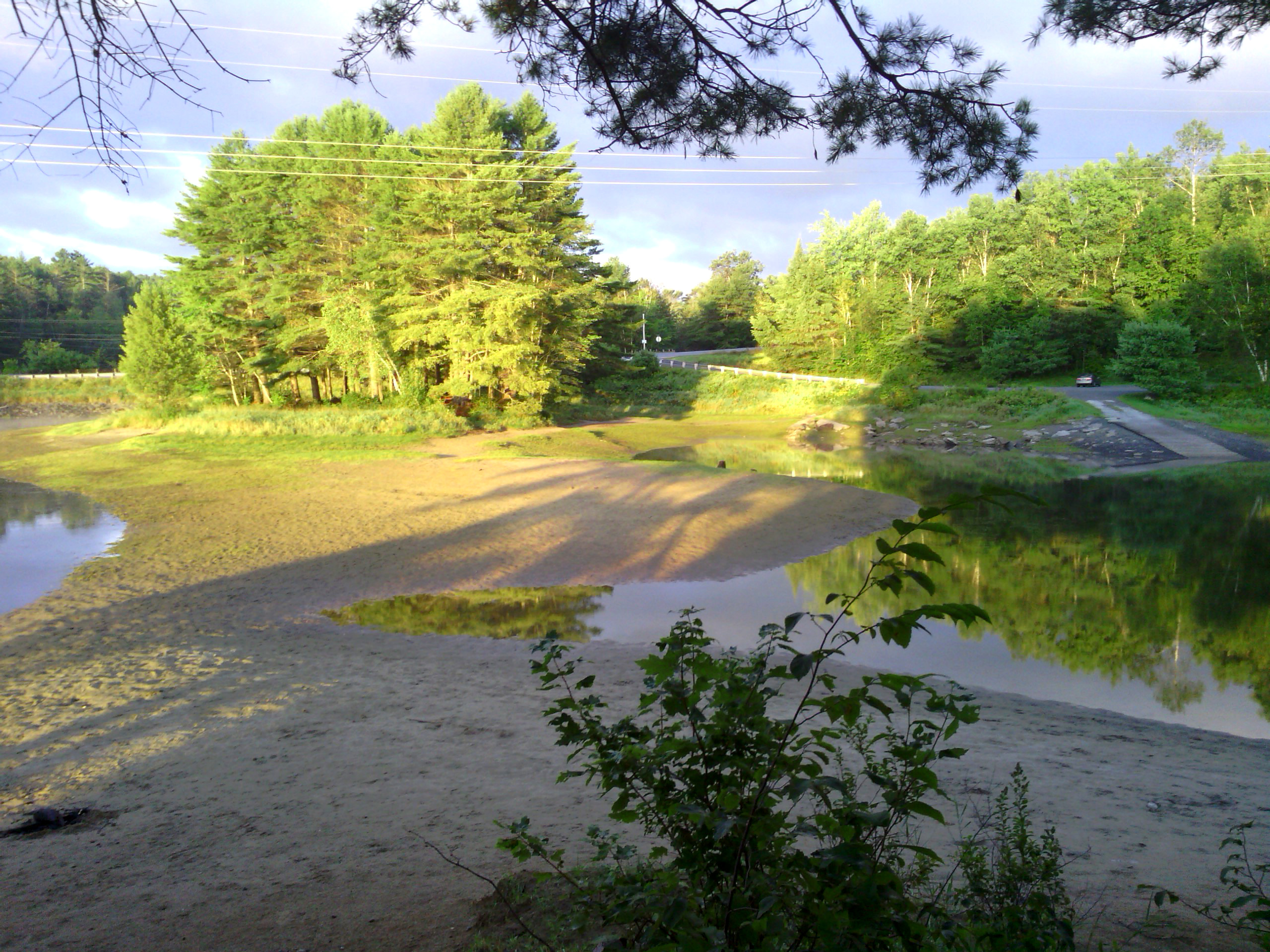
Separated from the main reservoir by the Curran-McAvoy Causeway (on which runs Interstate 93), Pine Island, pictured here at low water level, is a popular area for boating and swimming.

== See also ==
- List of lakes in New Hampshire
- List of lakes in Vermont
