= Mountain Lakes, New Hampshire =

Census-designated place in New Hampshire, United States

- Census-designated place
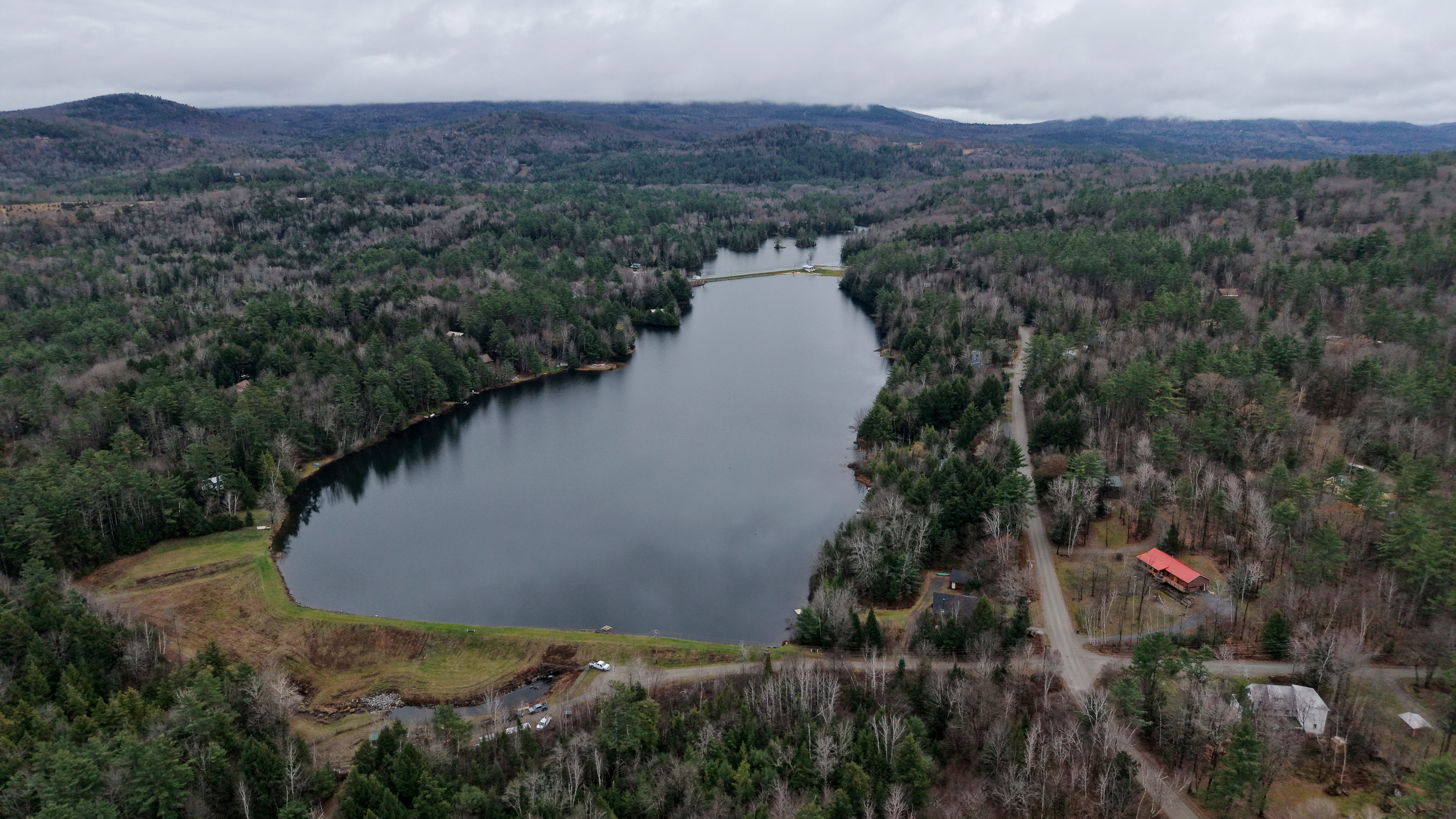
- Mountain Lakes, NH, from the northwest

- Location within New Hampshire Location within the United States
- Coordinates: 44°07′27″N 71°57′33″W
- Country: United States
- State: New Hampshire
- County: Grafton
- Towns: Haverhill, Bath

Area
  - Total: 3.63 sq mi (9.41 km^{2})
  - Land: 3.52 sq mi (9.12 km^{2})
  - Water: 0.11 sq mi (0.29 km^{2})
- Elevation: 764 ft (233 m)

Population (2020)
  - Total: 504
  - Density: 143.1/sq mi (55.27/km^{2})
- Time zone: UTC-5 (Eastern (EST))
  - Summer (DST): UTC-4 (EDT)
- Area code: 603
- FIPS code: 33-49600
- GNIS feature ID: 2629730

Mountain Lakes is a census-designated place (CDP) in the towns of Haverhill and Bath, New Hampshire, United States. It had a population of 504 at the 2020 census.

The Haverhill portion of the community is an independent incorporated district, with its own water system, planning board, and recreation program, and is guided by a three-member elected board of commissioners and annual district meeting.

== Geography ==
The Haverhill portion of Mountain Lakes surrounds two namesake lakes constructed on Waterman Brook, a north-flowing tributary of the Wild Ammonoosuc River. The CDP extends to the north into the neighboring town of Bath, as far as the Wild Ammonoosuc and the Swiftwater Covered Bridge. New Hampshire Route 112 travels across the Bath portion of the CDP, connecting Woodsville to the west with Kinsman Notch and North Woodstock to the east.

According to the United States Census Bureau, the Mountain Lakes CDP has a total area of 3.6 square miles (9.4 km^{2}), of which 3.5 square miles (9.1 km^{2}) are land and 0.1 square miles (0.3 km^{2}), or 3.10%, are water.

== Demographics ==
Historical population
Census	Pop.	Note	%±
2010	488		—
2020	504		3.3%
U.S. Decennial Census

As of the census of 2010, there were 488 people, 212 households, and 135 families residing in the CDP. There were 417 housing units, of which 205, or 49.2%, were vacant on Census Day (April 1). 196 of the vacant units were seasonal or vacation properties. The racial makeup of the CDP was 95.3% white, 1.2% African American, 1.2% Native American, 0.4% Asian, and 0.8% some other race, and 1.0% two or more races. 1.6% of the population were Hispanic or Latino of any race.

Of the 212 households in the CDP, 26.9% had children under the age of 18 living with them, 50.5% were headed by married couples living together, 8.5% had a female householder with no husband present, and 36.3% were non-families. 28.8% of all households were made up of individuals, and 10.4% were someone living alone who was 65 years of age or older. The average household size was 2.30, and the average family size was 2.84.

23.0% of residents in the CDP were under the age of 18, 5.0% were from age 18 to 24, 24.4% were from 25 to 44, 34.6% were from 45 to 64, and 12.9% were 65 years of age or older. The median age was 43.1 years. For every 100 females, there were 101.7 males. For every 100 females age 18 and over, there were 100.0 males.

For the period 2011–15, the estimated median annual income for a household was $47,155, and the median income for a family was $58,274. The per capita income for the CDP was $30,513.
