= New Hampshire Route 118 =

State highway in Grafton County, New Hampshire, US

New Hampshire Route 118
- Map of Grafton County in northwestern New Hampshire with NH 118 highlighted in red

Route information
- Maintained by NHDOT
- Length: 37.003 mi (59.551 km)

Major junctions
- South end: US 4 in Canaan
- North end: NH 112 in Woodstock

Location
- Country: United States
- State: New Hampshire
- Counties: Grafton

Highway system
- New Hampshire Highway System; Interstate; US; State; Turnpikes
← NH 117	→ NH 119

New Hampshire Route 118 (abbreviated NH 118) is a 37.003-mile-long (59.551 km) secondary north–south highway in Grafton County, New Hampshire. NH 118 stretches from Woodstock in the White Mountains Region south to Canaan in the Upper Valley region.

The northern terminus of NH 118 is at New Hampshire Route 112 (the Lost River Road) in Woodstock. The road runs southward through the towns of Warren, Wentworth, Rumney, and Dorchester. The southern terminus of NH 118 is at U.S. Route 4 in Canaan. From Canaan to Wentworth, the highway is named Dorchester Road. The section from Warren to the Lost River is known as the Sawyer Highway.

== Major intersections ==
The entire route is in Grafton County.

Location	mi	km	Destinations	Notes
Canaan	0.000	0.000	US 4 (Church Street) – Enfield, Lebanon, Grafton, Danbury	Southern terminus of NH 118
Rumney	15.035	24.196	NH 25 east – Plymouth	Southern end of concurrency with NH 25
Wentworth	19.250	30.980	NH 25A west (Orford Road) – Orford	Eastern terminus of NH 25A
Warren	23.095	37.168	NH 25C west (Lake Tarleton Road) – Piermont	Eastern terminus of NH 25C
Warren	23.994	38.615	NH 25 west (Mount Moosilauke Highway) – Haverhill	Northern end of concurrency with NH 25
Woodstock	37.003	59.551	NH 112 (Lost River Road) – Woodsville, North Woodstock, Lincoln	Northern terminus
1.000 mi = 1.609 km; 1.000 km = 0.621 mi: Concurrency terminus
