= Lincoln (CDP), New Hampshire =

Census-designated place in New Hampshire, United States

Lincoln, New Hampshire
- Census-designated place
- Location within New Hampshire Location within the United States
- Coordinates: 44°02′44″N 71°40′12″W
- Country: United States
- State: New Hampshire
- County: Grafton
- Town: Lincoln

Area
  - Total: 2.74 sq mi (7.09 km^{2})
  - Land: 2.69 sq mi (6.97 km^{2})
  - Water: 0.042 sq mi (0.11 km^{2})
- Elevation: 974 ft (297 m)

Population (2020)
  - Total: 969
  - Density: 360/sq mi (139/km^{2})
- Time zone: UTC-5 (Eastern (EST))
  - Summer (DST): UTC-4 (EDT)
- ZIP code: 03251
- Area code: 603
- FIPS code: 33-41780
- GNIS feature ID: 2629725

Lincoln is a census-designated place (CDP) and the main village in the town of Lincoln, New Hampshire, United States. The population of the CDP was 969 at the 2020 census, out of 1,631 in the entire town.

== Geography ==
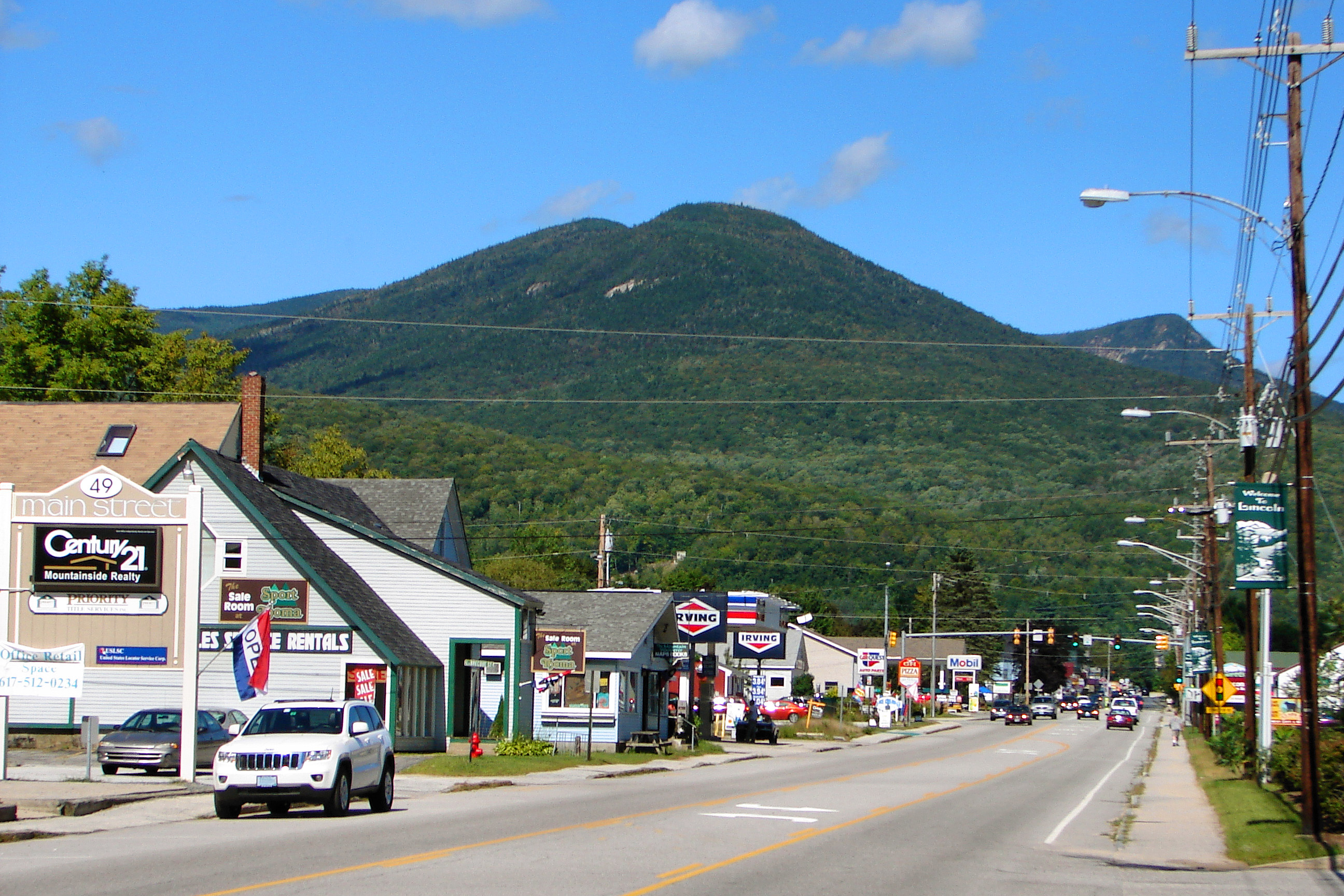
Lincoln, New Hampshire

The CDP is in the southwestern part of the town of Lincoln, between the Pemigewasset River and its East Branch, on the southern side of the White Mountains. The CDP is bordered to the south by the town of Woodstock, to the southeast by the East Branch of the Pemigewasset, to the east by Pollard Brook, and to the north by Little Coolidge Mountain. To the west the CDP is bordered by the Pemigewasset River and by Interstate 93. The northern part of the CDP is within the White Mountain National Forest. The CDP is overlooked to the south by 3,065-foot (934 m) Loon Mountain.

New Hampshire Route 112 is the main road through Lincoln, becoming the Kancamagus Highway as it enters the national forest to the east. The highway leads east 36 miles (58 km) to Conway. Interstate 93 intersects Route 112 at Exit 32 just south of the Lincoln town line in North Woodstock. I-93 leads north through Franconia Notch 22 miles (35 km) to Littleton and south 62 miles (100 km) to Concord, the state capital.

According to the U.S. Census Bureau, the Lincoln CDP has a total area of 2.7 square miles (7.1 km^{2}), of which 2.7 square miles (7.0 km^{2}) are land and 0.04 square miles (0.1 km^{2}), or 1.62%, are water.

== Demographics ==
Historical population
Census	Pop.	Note	%±
2010	993		—
2020	969		−2.4%
U.S. Decennial Census

As of the census of 2010, there were 993 people, 486 households, and 258 families residing in the CDP. There were 1,333 housing units, of which 847, or 63.5%, were vacant. 772 of the vacant units were seasonal or recreational housing. The racial makeup of the CDP was 99.1% white, 0.2% African American, 0.0% Native American, 0.2% Asian, 0.0% Pacific Islander, 0.3% some other race, and 0.2% from two or more races. 0.4% of the population were Hispanic or Latino of any race.

Of the 486 households in the CDP, 21.0% had children under the age of 18 living with them, 39.9% were headed by married couples living together, 8.6% had a female householder with no husband present, and 46.9% were non-families. 39.3% of all households were made up of individuals, and 15.0% were someone living alone who was 65 years of age or older. The average household size was 2.04, and the average family size was 2.71.

17.9% of residents in the CDP were under the age of 18, 6.2% were from age 18 to 24, 21.2% were from 25 to 44, 33.9% were from 45 to 64, and 20.5% were 65 years of age or older. The median age was 48.5 years. For every 100 females, there were 101.4 males. For every 100 females age 18 and over, there were 99.8 males.

For the period 2011–15, the estimated median annual income for a household was $37,000, and the median income for a family was $56,060. The per capita income for the CDP was $26,987. 17.9% of the population and 1.1% of families were below the poverty line, along with 6.0% of people under the age of 18 and 3.1% of people 65 or older.
