= Losing stream =

Stream or river that loses water as it flows downstream

A losing stream, disappearing stream, influent stream or sinking river is a stream or river that loses water as it flows downstream. The water infiltrates into the ground recharging the local groundwater, because the water table is below the bottom of the stream channel. This is the opposite of a more common gaining stream (or effluent stream) which increases in water volume farther downstream as it gains water from the local aquifer.

Losing streams are common in arid areas due to the climate which results in huge amounts of water evaporating from the river generally towards the mouth. Losing streams are also common in regions of karst topography where the streamwater may be completely captured by a cavern system, becoming a subterranean river.

== Examples ==
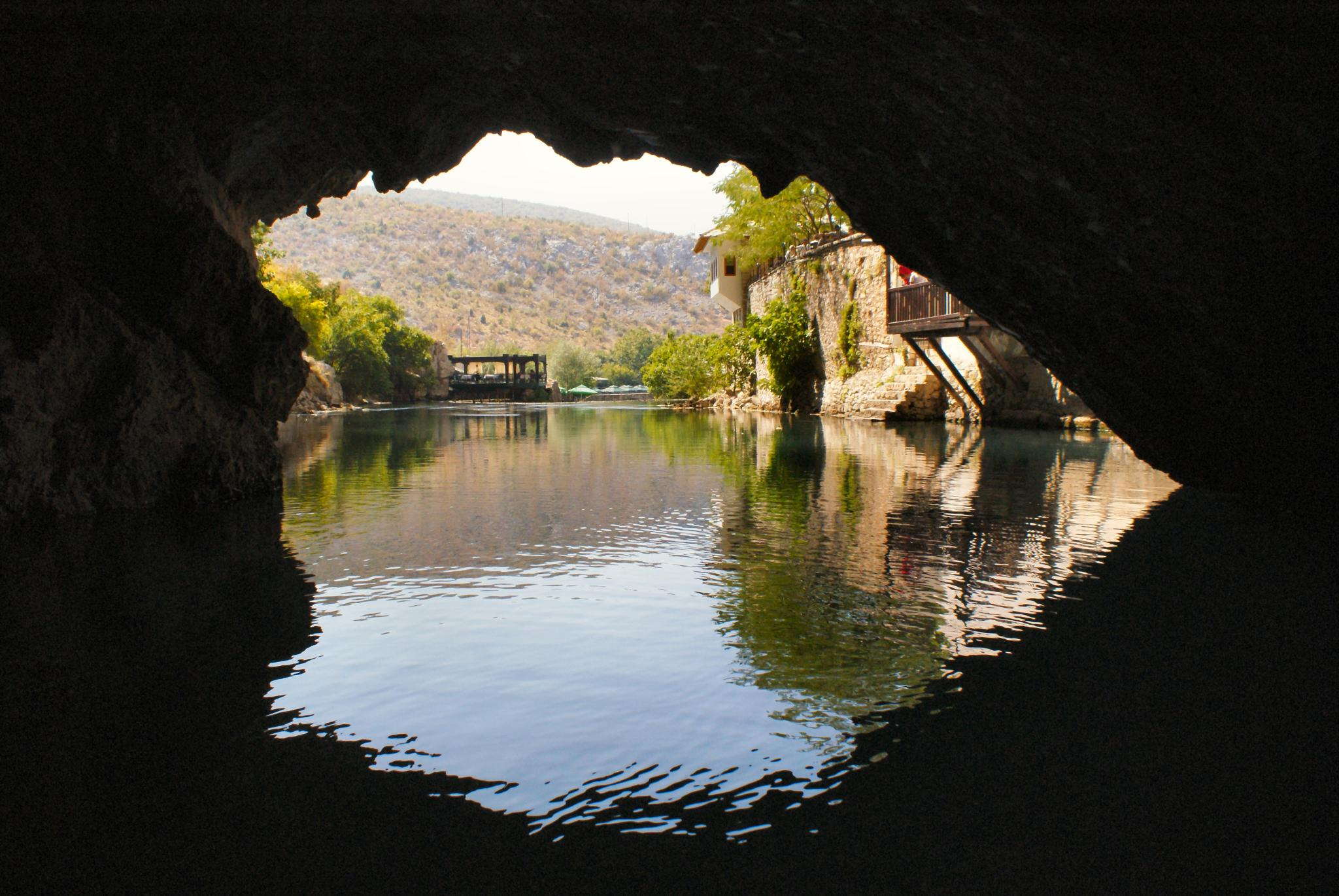
The cave of source of the Buna can be entered by boat and dived through a cave system serving as an effluence of the Zalomka.

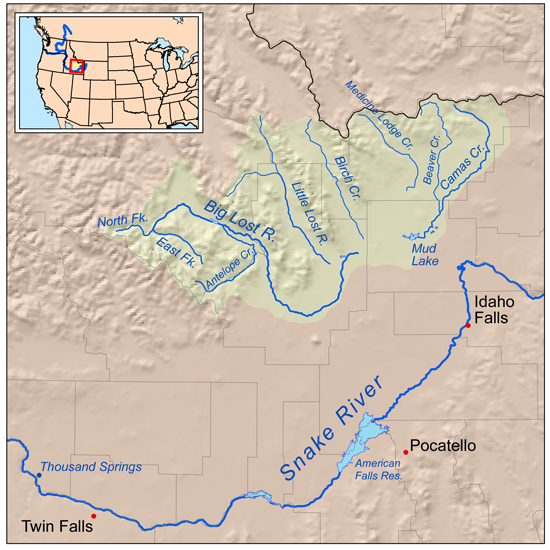
Map of the lost streams of Idaho

There are many natural examples of subterranean rivers including:

=== Bosnia and Herzegovina ===
- Unac; Mušnica-Trebišnjica-Krupa/Ombla (Trebišnjica is considered to be one of the largest sinking rivers in the world; one of its effluents, Ombla, springs out of huge cave near Dubrovnik, Croatia and after about 30 metres empties into the Adriatic Sea ria called Rijeka Dubrovačka); Zalomka-Buna/Bunica/Bregava; Vrljika-Trebižat; Lištica-Jasenica; Šuica-Ričina

=== Germany ===
- The Danube River disappears in the Danube Sinkhole between Immendingen and Möhringen in an area of karst.

=== New Zealand ===
- The Selwyn River / Waikirikiri normally disappears below ground as it flows down the Canterbury Plains due to overlaying a deep and porous aquifer, re-emerging about 15 kilometres away from its output at Lake Ellesmere / Te Waihora.

=== United States ===
- There are two rivers in Idaho, the Big Lost River and the Little Lost River, which both flow into the same depression and become subterranean, feeding the Snake River Plain Aquifer. Via the aquifer and numerous springs, they are tributaries of the Snake River.
- The Lost River in Indiana rises in Vernon Township, Washington County, Indiana, and discharges into the East Fork of the White River. The Lost River is about 85 miles (137 km) long and its name is derived from the fact that at least 23 miles (37 km) of the primary course of the river flows completely underground. The river disappears into a series of sink holes of the type that are abundant in the karstland of southern Indiana.
- The Lost River of New Hampshire is a 4-mile-long (6 km) stream in the White Mountains of New Hampshire. It is part of the Pemigewasset River watershed. The Lost River begins in Kinsman Notch, one of the major passes through the White Mountains. As it flows through the notch, it passes through Lost River Gorge, an area where enormous boulders falling off the flanking walls of the notch at the close of the last Ice Age have covered the river, creating a network of boulder caves.
- The Lost River of West Virginia is located in the Appalachian Mountains of Hardy County in the Eastern Panhandle region of the state. It flows into an underground channel northeast of Baker along West Virginia Route 259 at "the Sinks" and reappears near Wardensville as the Cacapon River.

== See also ==
- Ponor
- Groundwater
- Spring (hydrology)
- Subterranean river
