= Moosilauke Brook =

- Location within New Hampshire Location within the United States

Location
- Country: United States
- State: New Hampshire
- County: Grafton
- Town: Woodstock

Physical characteristics
- Source: Lost River
  - location: Woodstock
  - coordinates: 44°1′16″N 71°43′52″W
  - elevation: 955 ft (291 m)
- Mouth: Pemigewasset River
  - location: North Woodstock
  - coordinates: 44°1′32″N 71°41′5″W
  - elevation: 700 ft (210 m)
- Length: 3.2 mi (5.1 km)

Basin features
- Tributaries
  - left: Smith Brook, Gordon Pond Brook
  - right: Jackman Brook, Pike Brook

Moosilauke Brook is a 3.2-mile-long (5.1 km) stream in the White Mountains of New Hampshire in the United States. It is the downstream continuation of the Lost River and is a tributary of the Pemigewasset River, part of the Merrimack River watershed.

Moosilauke Brook begins in the eastern part of Kinsman Notch, where the Lost River, flowing out of the center of the notch, joins Jackman Brook entering from the south. Moosilauke Brook runs northeast, passing through the granite gorge of Agassiz Basin and joining the Pemigewasset River in the village of North Woodstock.

New Hampshire Route 112 follows Moosilauke Brook for its entire course.

== See also ==
- List of rivers of New Hampshire
