= Sink Branch =

Stream in Shelby County, Missouri, U.S.

Coordinates: 39.778093°N 92.162123°W

Sink Branch is a stream in Shelby County in the U.S. state of Missouri. It is a tributary of North Fork Salt River.

Sink Branch was named for the fact it is a losing stream on part of its course.

== See also ==
- List of rivers of Missouri
