= Easton, New Hampshire =

- Town
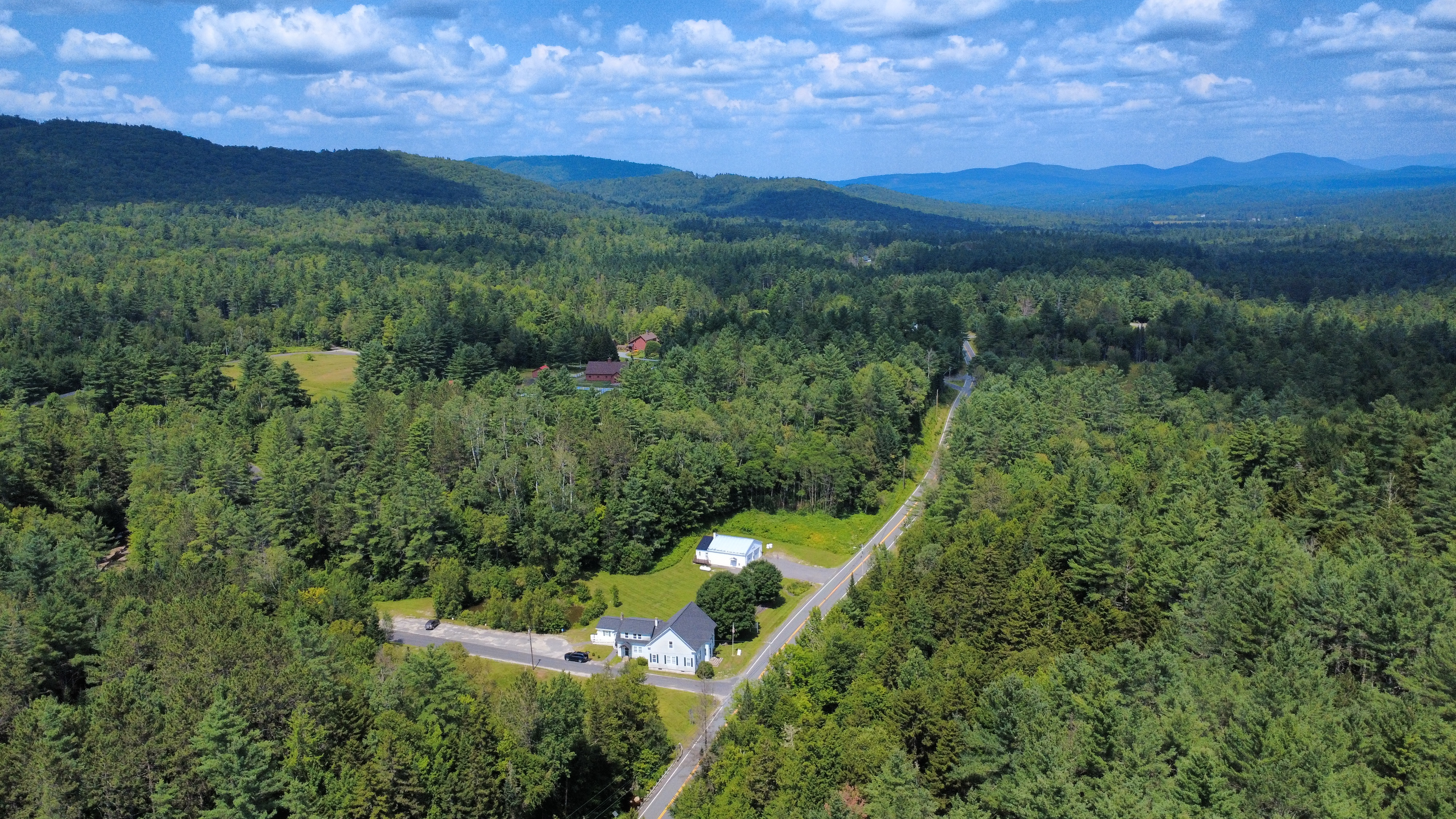
- View of Easton Town Hall from the south

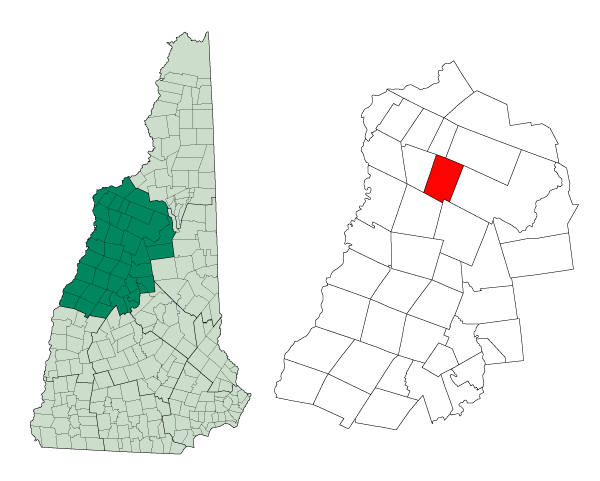
- Location in Grafton County, New Hampshire
- Coordinates: 44°07′34″N 71°47′39″W
- Country: United States
- State: New Hampshire
- County: Grafton
- Incorporated: 1876

Area
  - Total: 31.15 sq mi (80.68 km^{2})
  - Land: 31.14 sq mi (80.64 km^{2})
  - Water: 0.015 sq mi (0.04 km^{2}) 0.04%
- Elevation: 1,296 ft (395 m)

Population (2020)
  - Total: 292
  - Density: 9.3/sq mi (3.6/km^{2})
- Time zone: UTC-5 (Eastern)
  - Summer (DST): UTC-4 (Eastern)
- ZIP Codes: 03580 (Franconia/Easton); 03785 (Woodsville)
- Area code: 603
- FIPS code: 33-22020
- GNIS feature ID: 873586
- Website: eastonnh.gov

Easton is a town in Grafton County, New Hampshire, United States. The population was 292 at the 2020 census.

== History ==
Formed from a part of Landaff known as East Landaff, Easton was incorporated in 1876. Kinsman Mountain, the Kinsman Range, and Kinsman Notch are named for Nathaniel Kinsman, one of the original settlers.

Easton once contained a small logging settlement known as Wildwood. The community contained a school, a post office, several sawmills, a boarding house and a few homes. Log drives transporting lumber harvested from Mt. Moosilauke down the Wild Ammonoosuc River were conducted there until 1911. In 1933, Wildwood was the sight of New Hampshire's first Civilian Conservation Corps camp.

== Geography ==
According to the United States Census Bureau, the town has a total area of 31.2 square miles (80.7 km^{2}), of which 0.02 square miles (0.04 km^{2}), or 0.04%, are water. The west-flowing Wild Ammonoosuc River drains the southern part of town, while the north-flowing Ham Branch of the Gale River drains the northern portion and passes the town's village. Easton lies fully within the Connecticut River watershed. The Kinsman Range of the White Mountains occupies the eastern side of the town, with the ridgecrest to the east in the town of Lincoln. The highest point in Easton is 4,040 feet (1,230 m) above sea level, just west of the 4,293-foot (1,309 m) summit of the North Peak of Kinsman Mountain.

New Hampshire Route 116 crosses the town from north to south, passing through the town center. New Hampshire Route 112 crosses the southern part of the town from east to west, following the Wild Ammonoosuc River.

== Demographics ==
Historical population
Census	Pop.	Note	%±
1880	302		—
1890	248		−17.9%
1900	249		0.4%
1910	226		−9.2%
1920	131		−42.0%
1930	132		0.8%
1940	156		18.2%
1950	94		−39.7%
1960	74		−21.3%
1970	92		24.3%
1980	124		34.8%
1990	223		79.8%
2000	256		14.8%
2010	254		−0.8%
2020	292		15.0%
U.S. Decennial Census

At the 2000 census there were 256 people, 117 households, and 84 families living in the town. The population density was 8.2 people per square mile (3.2/km^{2}). There were 187 housing units at an average density of 6.0 per square mile (2.3/km^{2}). The racial makeup of the town was 96.48% White, 0.78% Native American, and 2.73% from two or more races. Hispanic or Latino of any race were 0.78%.

Of the 117 households 23.9% had children under the age of 18 living with them, 58.1% were married couples living together, 10.3% had a female householder with no husband present, and 28.2% were non-families. 23.1% of households were one person and 6.8% were one person aged 65 or older. The average household size was 2.19 and the average family size was 2.54.

The age distribution was 19.1% under the age of 18, 3.9% from 18 to 24, 22.3% from 25 to 44, 35.2% from 45 to 64, and 19.5% 65 or older. The median age was 47 years. For every 100 females, there were 98.4 males. For every 100 females age 18 and over, there were 97.1 males.

The median household income was $49,167 and the median family income was $69,375. Males had a median income of $41,875 versus $23,750 for females. The per capita income for the town was $31,841. About 6.0% of families and 10.0% of the population were below the poverty line, including 30.6% of those under the age of eighteen and none of those sixty five or over.

== Notable person ==
- Bode Miller (born 1977), Olympic gold medalist skier; born in Easton
