= Lost River Reservation =

Protected gorge area in New Hampshire, USA

Coordinates: 44°02′16″N 71°47′02″W

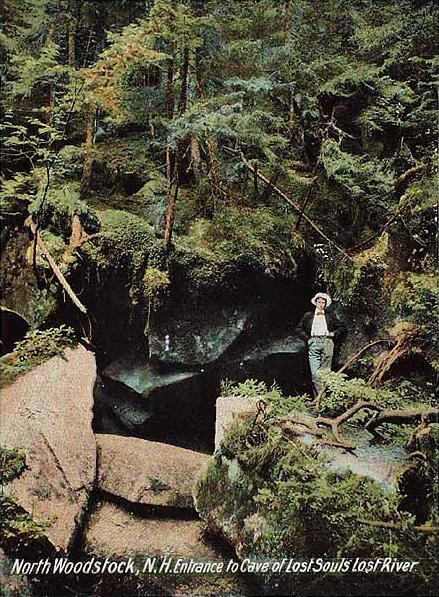
Cave of Lost Souls c. 1908

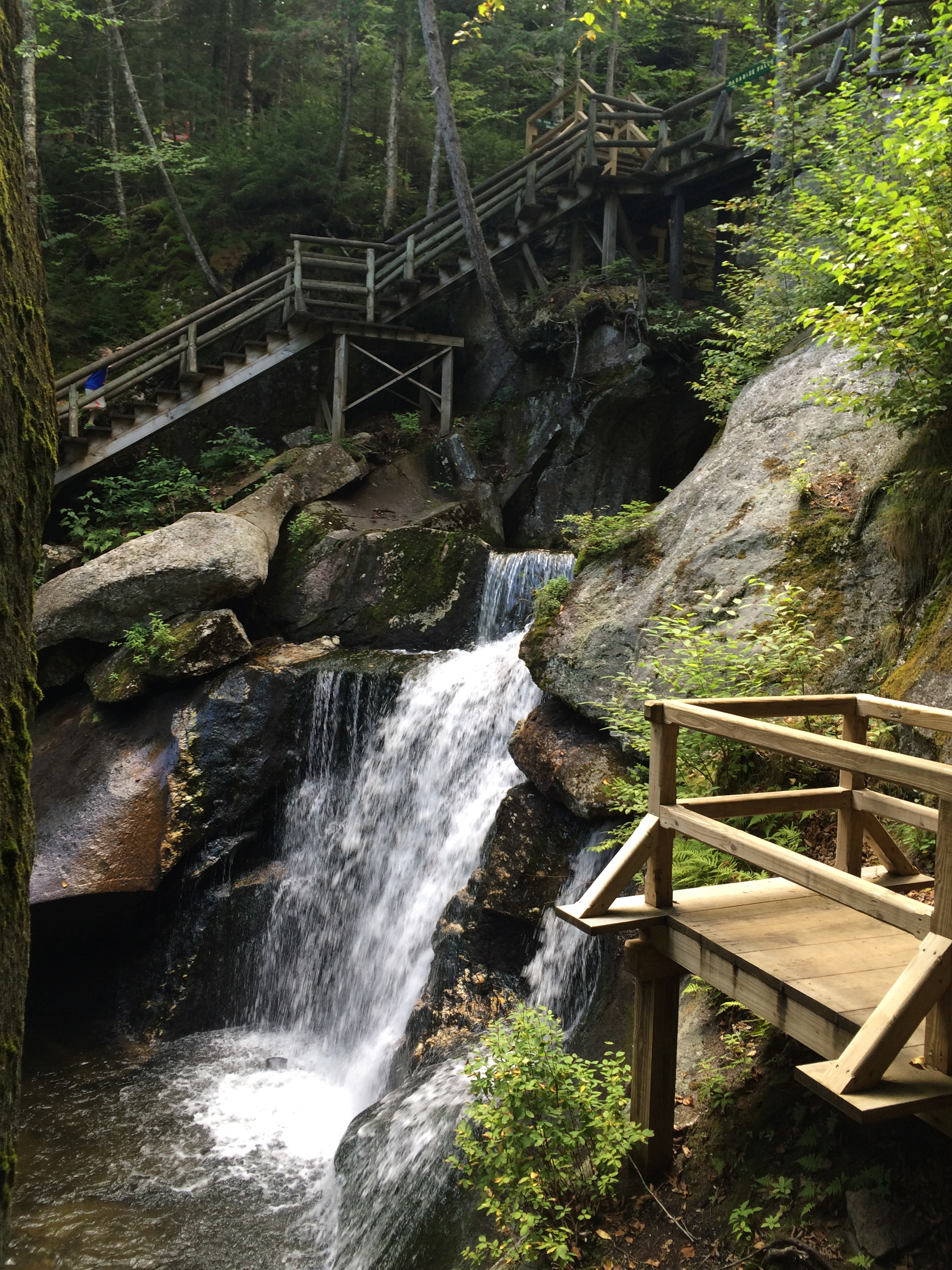
Paradise Falls in Lost River Gorge

The Lost River Reservation (also known as the Lost River Gorge & Boulder Caves) is a protected area with a series of boulder caves along a gorge in the White Mountains in Woodstock, New Hampshire, United States. Located 5 miles (8 km) west of the village of North Woodstock on New Hampshire Route 112, Lost River Reservation is set in Kinsman Notch. One of the White Mountains' major passes, Kinsman Notch lies between Mount Moosilauke and Kinsman Ridge at just under 2,000 feet (600 m) above sea level.

== Description ==
The Lost River is so-named because the brook draining the southern part of Kinsman Notch disappears below the surface in a narrow, steep-walled glacial gorge. The gorge is partially filled with immense blocks of granite, through the spaces of which the brook cascades along its subterranean course until it eventually emerges and joins the Pemigewasset River, which flows southward from Franconia Notch.

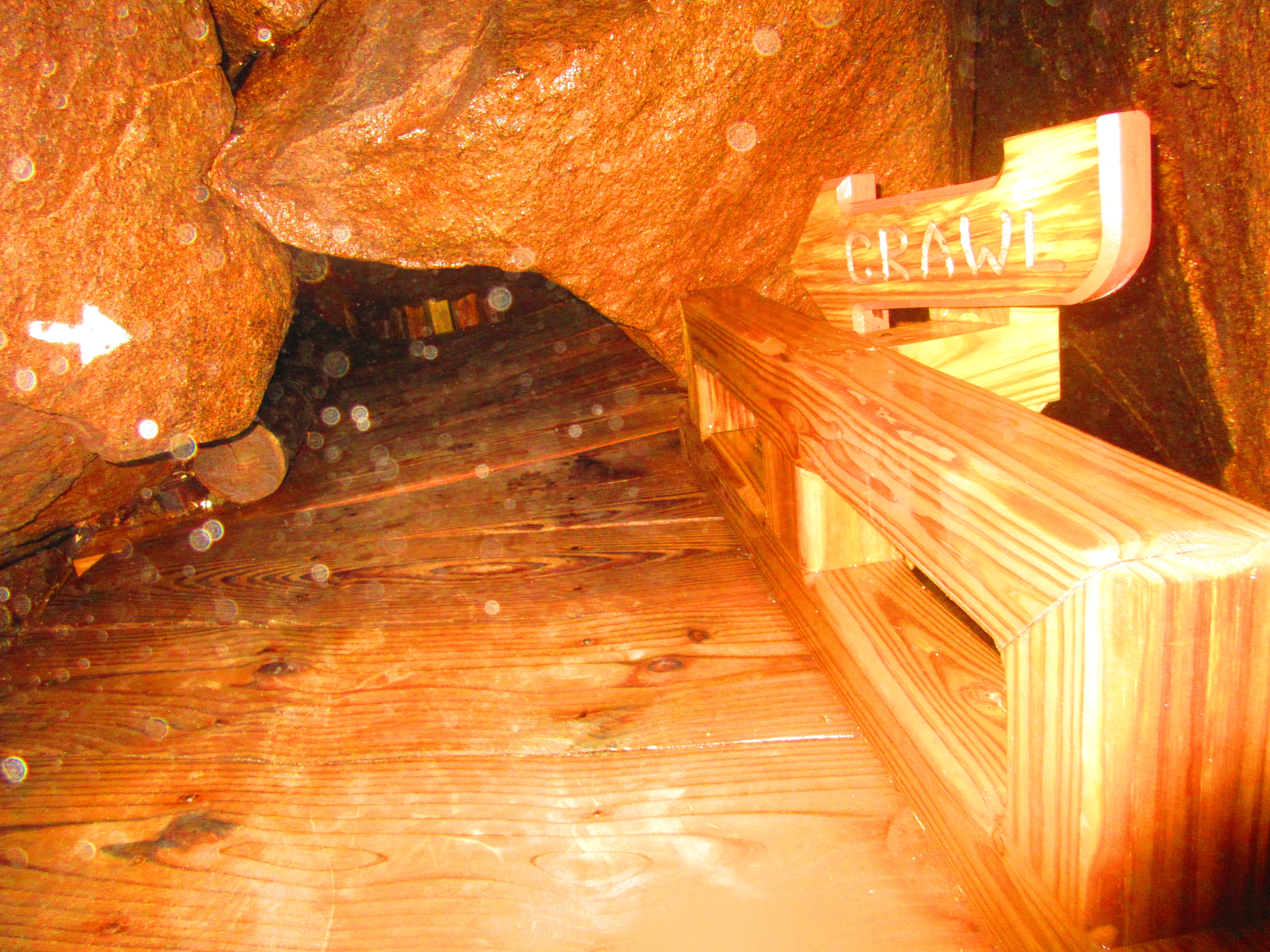
Crawling through one of the gorge's most narrow caves

Lost River Reservation protects 157 acres (64 ha) around the gorge and is owned by the Society for the Protection of New Hampshire Forests. Admission to the gorge is by fee. There are stairs down to the gorge area, with a 3/4 mile (1.2 km) boardwalk along the gorge. Most caves can be walked or crawled into.

The Forest Society maintains two free trails on the Lost River Reservation, which are separate from the gorge area leased to White Mountain Attractions.
