= Ayers Island Reservoir =

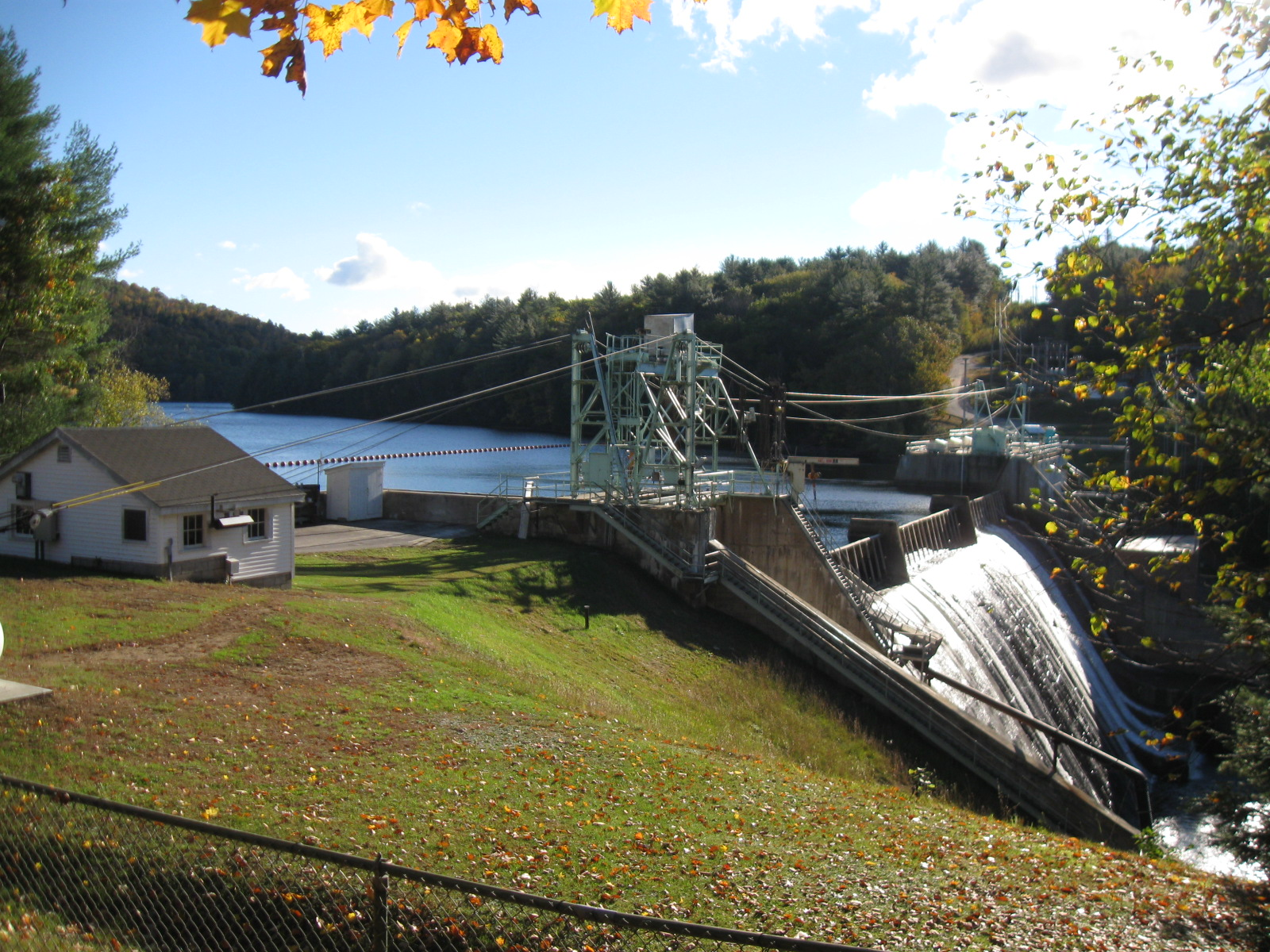
- Ayers Island Dam

- Location within New Hampshire Location within the United States
- Location: Grafton County and Belknap County, New Hampshire
- Coordinates: 43°35′52″N 71°43′04″W
- Type: Reservoir
- Primary inflows: Pemigewasset River
- Primary outflows: Pemigewasset River
- Basin countries: United States
- Max. length: 5.5 mi (8.9 km)
- Max. width: 0.2 mi (0.32 km)
- Surface elevation: 450 ft (140 m)
- Settlements: Bristol; New Hampton

The Ayers Island Reservoir is a reservoir located on the Pemigewasset River in central New Hampshire, United States. It occupies the border between the towns of Bristol and New Hampton.
