= The Rocks (New Hampshire) =

Historic house in New Hampshire, United States

- Rocks Estate
- U.S. National Register of Historic Places
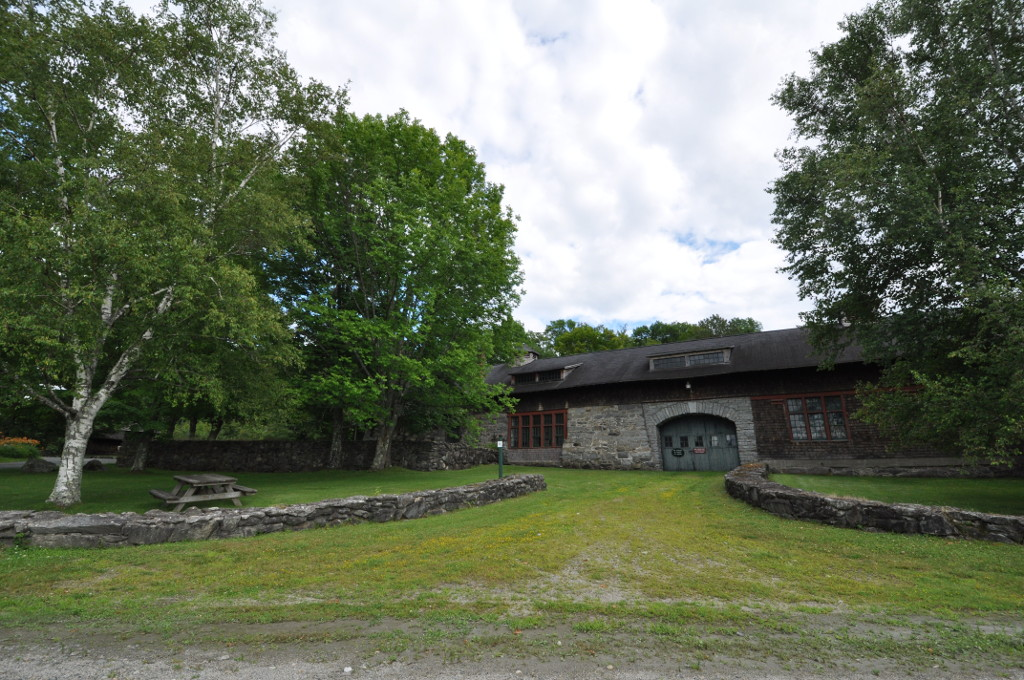

- Location within New Hampshire Location within the United States
- Location: Bethlehem, New Hampshire
- Coordinates: 44°16′52″N 71°44′3″W
- Area: 1,333.8 acres (539.8 ha)
- Built: 1883
- Architect: Multiple
- Architectural style: Greek Revival, Shingle Style
- NRHP reference No.: 84003197
- Added to NRHP: September 7, 1984

The Rocks Estate, also known as the John Jacob Glessner Estate, is a historic summer estate in Bethlehem, New Hampshire. The large estate, covering more than 1,300 acres (530 ha), is located near the junction of U.S. Route 302 and Interstate 93, and includes some twenty buildings. The estate was assembled by John Jacob Glessner (whose Chicago residence is a National Historic Landmark designed by H. H. Richardson) in the 1880s, and is one of the largest and best-preserved surviving private estates in the state. Glessner created The Rocks as a private conservation initiative, to prevent destructive farming methods from destroying the land.

The large Shingle-style house he had built in 1883 no longer stands, but a significant number of outbuildings survive, including a carriage house, horse barn, and a sawmill/pigpen building in a cluster of buildings located generally northward of the former house site. At least three of these buildings were designed by Chicago architect Hermann V. von Holst, and are of unusually high quality in their design and construction. There is a subsidiary area of the estate known as the Red Farm, centered on a c. 1840 farmhouse.

The estate was listed on the National Register of Historic Places in 1984. The property is now owned by the Society for the Protection of New Hampshire Forests and is open to the public. It is managed by that organization according to principles articulated by Glessner, preserving an important aspect of the property.

== See also ==
- National Register of Historic Places listings in Grafton County, New Hampshire
