= Wild Ammonoosuc River =

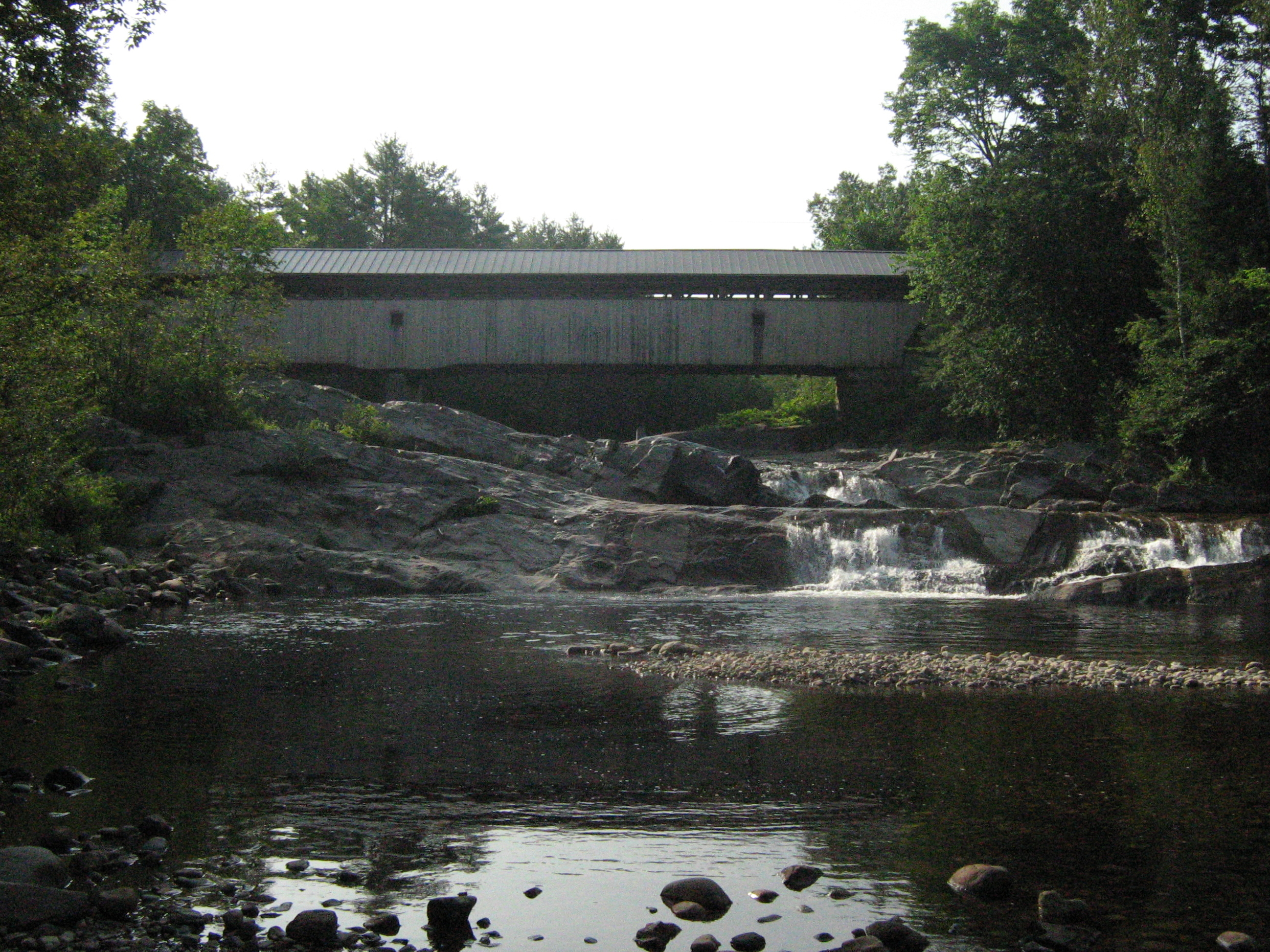
- Swiftwater Covered Bridge over the Wild Ammonoosuc

- Location within New Hampshire Location within the United States

Location
- Country: United States
- State: New Hampshire
- County: Grafton
- Towns: Woodstock, Easton, Landaff, Bath

Physical characteristics
- Source: Beaver Pond
  - location: Kinsman Notch, Woodstock
  - coordinates: 44°2′39″N 71°47′35″W
  - elevation: 1,850 ft (560 m)
- Mouth: Ammonoosuc River
  - location: Bath
  - coordinates: 44°9′16″N 71°58′52″W
  - elevation: 462 ft (141 m)
- Length: 14.9 mi (24.0 km)

Basin features
- Tributaries
  - left: Stark Falls Brook, Tunnel Brook, Davis Brook, Whitcher Brook, Waterman Brook
  - right: Underhill Brook, Clay Brook, Black Brook, Bowen Brook, Dearth Brook, Petty Brook

The Wild Ammonoosuc River is a tributary of the Ammonoosuc River, about 15 miles (24 km) long, in northwestern New Hampshire in the United States. Via the Ammonoosuc River, it is part of the watershed of the Connecticut River, which flows to Long Island Sound.

The Wild Ammonoosuc flows for its entire length in Grafton County. It rises in the White Mountains at Kinsman Notch in the town of Woodstock and flows generally northwestwardly through the towns of Easton and Landaff to Bath, where it joins the Ammonoosuc. New Hampshire Route 112 follows the river for its entire length.

== See also ==
- List of New Hampshire rivers
