= Society for the Protection of New Hampshire Forests =

The Society for the Protection of New Hampshire Forests (SPNHF) is a private, non-profit, land conservation and sustainable forestry organization based in the U.S. state of New Hampshire. It purchases or is given easements on property, or obtains outright ownership, as a way to conserve land for wildlife, recreation, sustainable forestry and sustainable agriculture. It also performs advocacy and education services. It was established in February 1901, with Frank W. Rollins as its first president. Philip W. Ayres was appointed the first Forester. During the 1920s, the SPNHF raised over $100,000 towards the purchase of land in Franconia Notch.

As of 2017, the society owns more than 180 properties covering 54,000 acres (22,000 ha), including Rocks Estate and Bretzfelder Memorial Park. It also holds conservation easements on more than 700 pieces of property covering 132,786 acres (53,737 ha), and has land transferred with deed restrictions on 94 properties, covering 13,377 acres (5,413 ha). Among other properties it owns are the Lost River Reservation in Woodstock, and the Mount Monadnock Reservation, 4,450 acres (1,800 ha) in Jaffrey and Dublin, New Hampshire.

In addition to holding easements, SPNHF acts as a resource for landowners and other, smaller conservation land trusts. Staff make presentations and host seminars for the public and other local land trusts. One of its larger events is an annual "Saving Special Places" workshop. Members of the public, town conservation commissions and land trusts attend seminars presenting information ranging from tax laws and conservation easement creation to fundraising techniques and marketing a land trust. From its inception, it has produced occasional publications for guidance and information, such as A New Hampshire Everlasting and Unfallen (1969) and At What Cost? Shaping the Land We Call New Hampshire: A Land Use History, edited by Richard Ober (1991).

In contrast with other environmental groups that seek the preservation of the environment through advocating government management and regulation, the SPNHF seeks to assist and incentivize private landowners in preserving New Hampshire forest land for future posterity. The SPNHF specializes in land acquisitions and conservation easements, instead of government management of the land, and assists landowners in land conservation, protecting their property, environmental tax strategies, and fostering open space protection in their community.
