= Lost River (New Hampshire) =

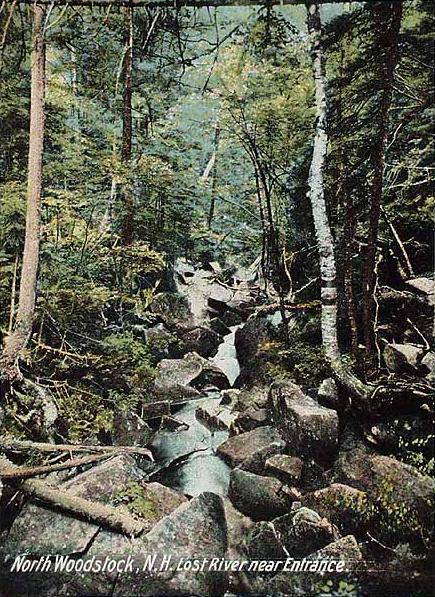
- Lost River c. 1908

- Location within New Hampshire Location within the United States

Location
- Country: United States
- State: New Hampshire
- County: Grafton
- Town: Woodstock

Physical characteristics
- Source: Mount Moosilauke
  - location: White Mountain National Forest
  - coordinates: 44°1′58″N 71°47′58″W
  - elevation: 2,640 ft (800 m)
- Mouth: Moosilauke Brook
  - location: Woodstock
  - coordinates: 44°1′11″N 71°44′5″W
  - elevation: 980 ft (300 m)
- Length: 4.0 mi (6.4 km)

Basin features
- Tributaries
  - right: Walker Brook

The Lost River is a 4.0-mile-long (6.4 km) stream in the White Mountains of New Hampshire in the United States. It is a tributary of Moosilauke Brook, part of the Pemigewasset River watershed leading to the Merrimack River.

The Lost River begins on the eastern slopes of Mount Moosilauke below the peak of Mount Jim and above Kinsman Notch, one of the major passes through the White Mountains. As it flows through the notch, it passes through Lost River Gorge, an area where enormous boulders falling off the flanking walls of the notch at the close of the last Ice Age have covered the river, creating a network of boulder caves. The gorge is owned by the Society for the Protection of New Hampshire Forests and is operated as a tourist attraction, with trails and ladders accessing many of the caves.

The river flows southeast from Kinsman Notch to Jackman Brook, where the two streams form Moosilauke Brook, which continues northeast through the granite gorge of Agassiz Basin and joins the Pemigewasset River in the village of North Woodstock.

New Hampshire Route 112 follows the Lost River from Kinsman Notch to Moosilauke Brook.

== See also ==
- List of rivers of New Hampshire
