= Kinsman Notch =

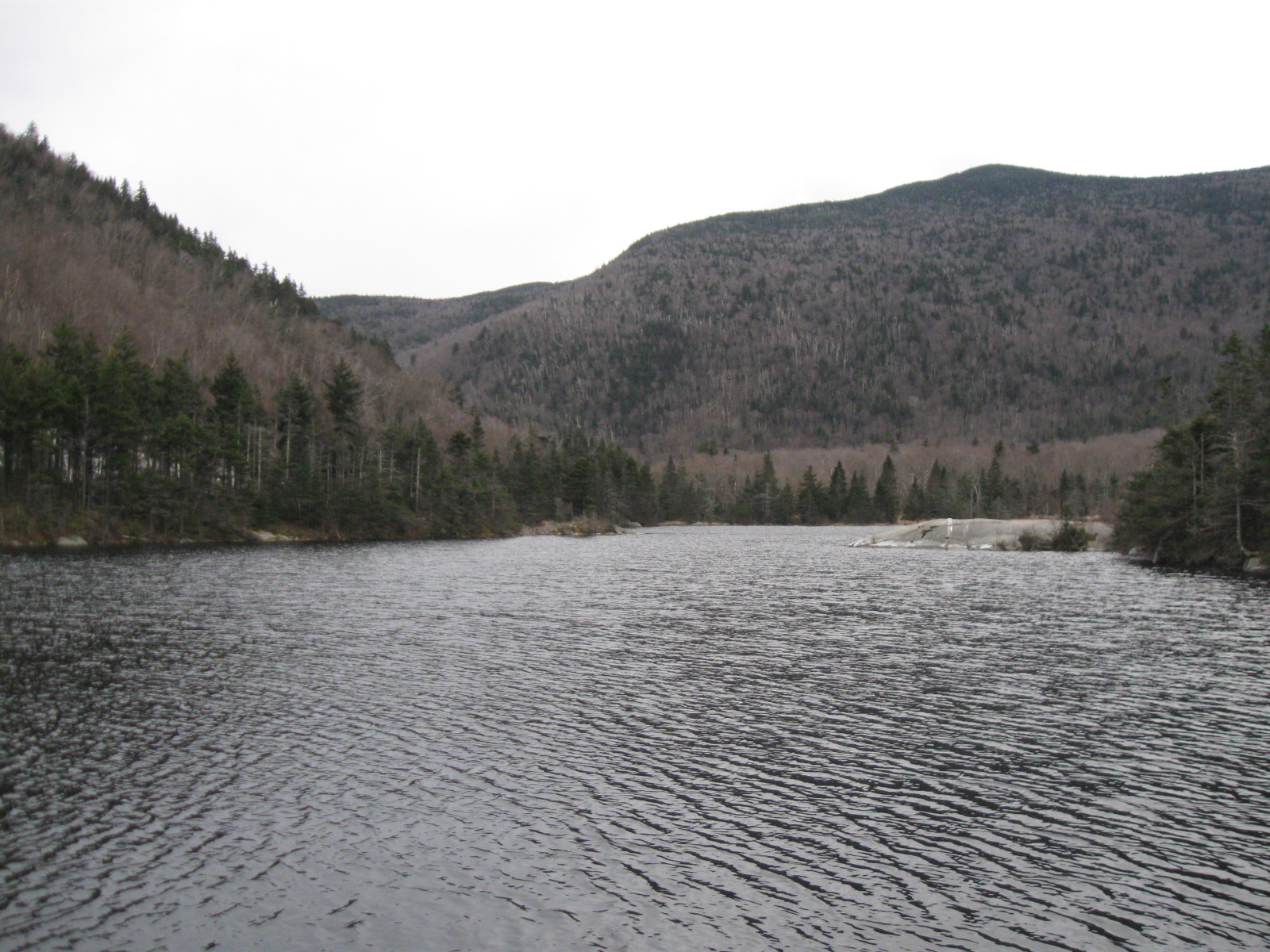
- Beaver Pond near height of land in Kinsman Notch
- Interactive map of Kinsman Notch
- Elevation: 1,870 ft (570 m)
- Traversed by: NH Rte. 112

Third Approach
- Location: Woodstock, Grafton County, New Hampshire, United States
- Range: White Mountains
- Coordinates: 44.0392°N 71.7925°W
- Topo map: USGS Mount Moosilauke

Kinsman Notch (elev. 1,870 feet (570 m)) is a mountain pass located in the White Mountains of New Hampshire, United States. It is the westernmost of the major notches through the White Mountains (the others being Franconia Notch, Crawford Notch, and Pinkham Notch). To the southeast, the valley of the notch is drained by the Lost River, leading to the Pemigewasset River, and ultimately the Merrimack, flowing into the Gulf of Maine. The northwest half of the notch is drained by Beaver Brook and the Wild Ammonoosuc River, part of the Connecticut River watershed leading to Long Island Sound.

The notch lies between Mount Moosilauke to the southwest and Kinsman Ridge to the northeast. The Appalachian Trail crosses the height of land in the notch on its route between Moosilauke and Kinsman Ridge. The trail descends Moosilauke along Beaver Brook Cascades, a long set of waterfalls descending a total of 1,200 feet (370 m).

The Lost River Reservation, a wild gorge filled with enormous boulders, is found in the floor of the notch to the southeast of the height of land.

New Hampshire Route 112 traverses the notch on its route from North Woodstock to Woodsville, New Hampshire.

== See also ==
- List of mountain passes in New Hampshire
