= New Hampshire Route 112 =

State highway in northern New Hampshire, US

New Hampshire Route 112
- Map of northern New Hampshire with NH 112 highlighted in red

Route information
- Maintained by NHDOT
- Length: 56.387 mi (90.746 km)
- Tourist routes: Kancamagus Scenic Byway

Major junctions
- West end: US 302 / NH 10 in Bath
- US 3 in North Woodstock; I-93 in North Woodstock
- East end: NH 16 / NH 113 in Conway

Location
- Country: United States
- State: New Hampshire
- Counties: Grafton, Carroll

Highway system
- New Hampshire Highway System; Interstate; US; State; Turnpikes
← NH 111	→ NH 113

New Hampshire Route 112 (NH 112) is a 56.39-mile-long (90.75 km) east–west state highway in northern New Hampshire. The highway winds across the state, connecting Bath to Conway through the heart of the scenic and mountainous White Mountain National Forest.

The eastern portion of NH 112 is known as the Kancamagus Highway, running 32 miles (51 km) through the White Mountains from Lincoln to Conway. 26.5 miles (42.6 km) of the highway have been designated a National Scenic Byway by the United States Department of Transportation under the name "Kancamagus Scenic Byway". The highway is known for its views of autumn foliage and is a popular drive in September and October for leaf peeping tourism.

The Kancamagus Highway stays open all winter, although it occasionally closes for short periods while crews clear heavy snows. Its only major intersection is Bear Notch Road, which connects with the town of Bartlett, but it is closed all winter.

Much of the western portion of NH 112 is also in the White Mountain National Forest, passing through Kinsman Notch with the Lost River tourist attraction. The section between NH 116 and North Woodstock is called Lost River Road.

== Route description ==
=== Bath to Lincoln ===
NH 112 begins in the town of Bath at US 302 and NH 10 approximately 4 miles (6 km) east of the Vermont border. The highway runs southeast along the Wild Ammonoosuc River, then climbs through Kinsman Notch. NH 112 crosses into the town limits of Woodstock and descends along the Lost River, meeting the northern terminus of NH 118 before continuing east to the village of North Woodstock. The route passes through the center of the village, crossing US 3 and interchanging with I-93 before entering Lincoln. NH 112 passes through downtown Lincoln as Main Street.

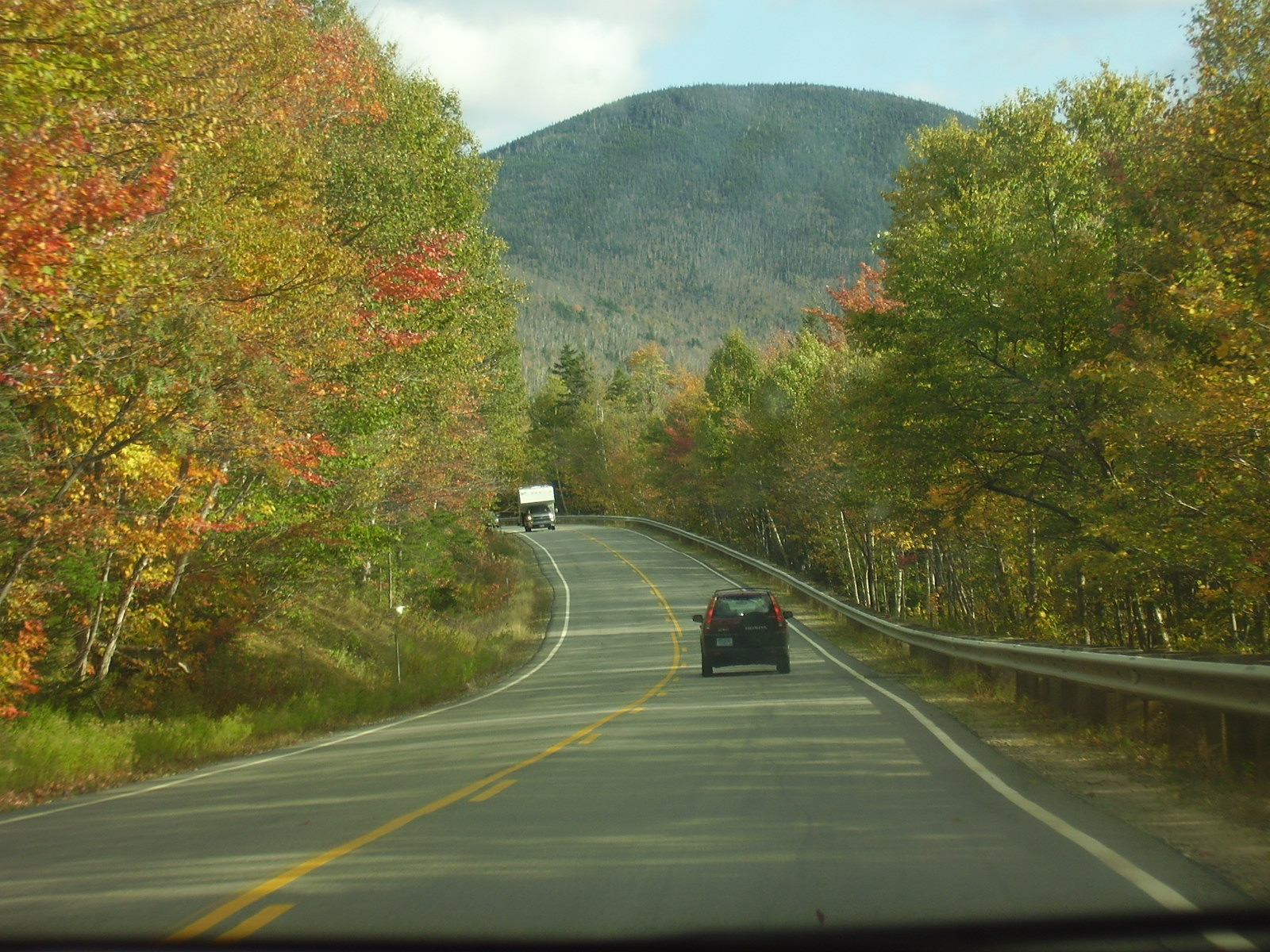
View along the Kancamagus Highway in the White Mountain National Forest

=== Lincoln to Conway (Kancamagus Highway) ===
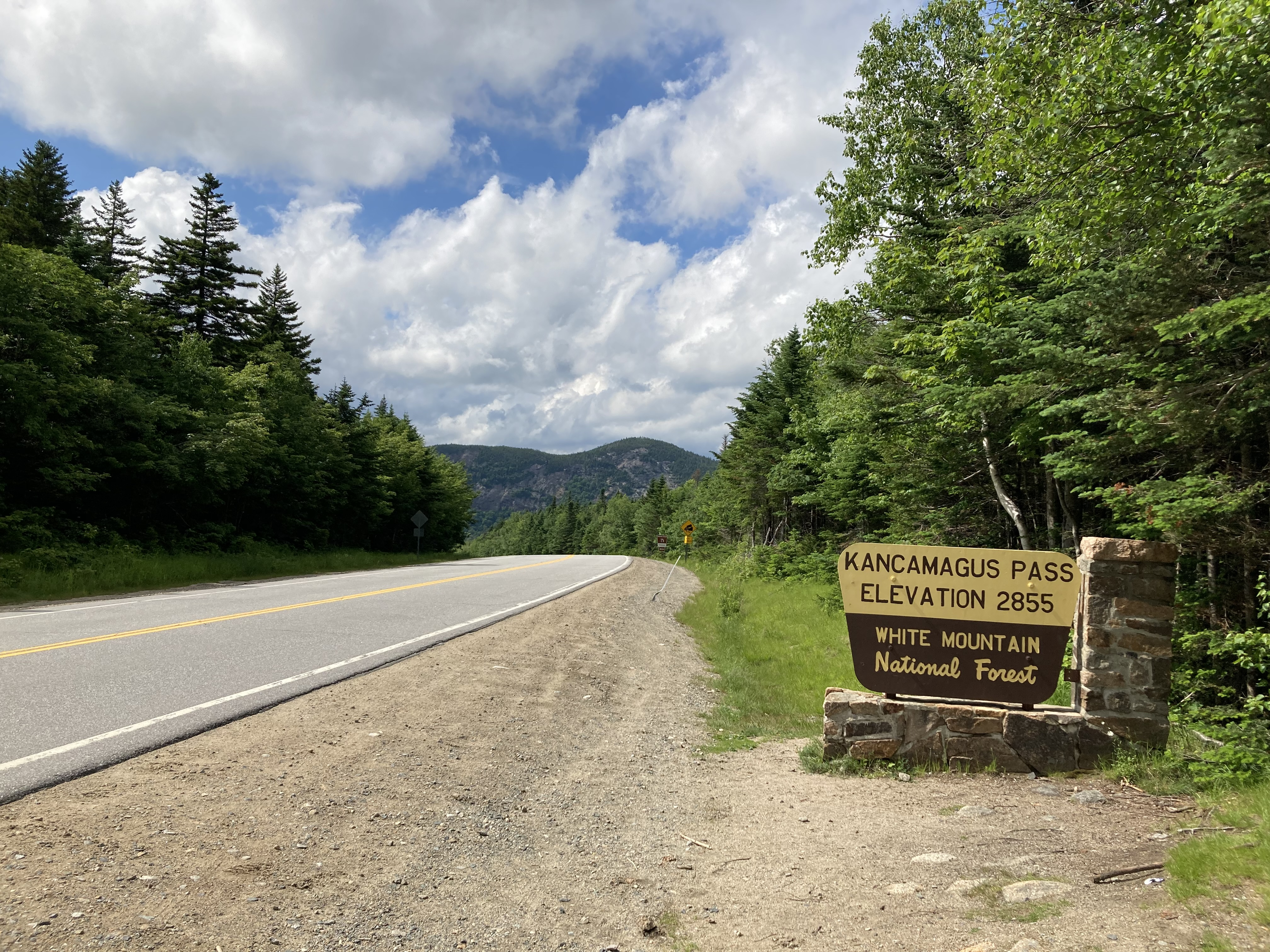
Westbound view from Kancamagus Pass

The Kancamagus Highway portion of NH 112 begins just east of the town center. The state highway reenters the White Mountain National Forest, following the East Branch of the Pemigewasset River for approximately 4 miles (6 km), then the Hancock Branch for another 8 miles (13 km), steadily ascending as it progresses eastward. Following a series of hairpin turns, NH 112 crosses the height of land at 2,855-foot (870 m) Kancamagus Pass and begins to descend along the Swift River in the Saco River watershed, which it does for its remaining 21 miles (34 km). Eventually the highway leaves the National Forest and enters the town of Conway, where it terminates at Main Street (NH 16 / NH 113) west of downtown.

The Kancamagus Highway is a very popular tourist destination due to its many scenic views and locations. Two scenic outlook sites are located along the Kancamagus Highway, including one from near the crest of Kancamagus Pass. There are six National Forest campground sites, along with numerous hiking trails.

== History ==
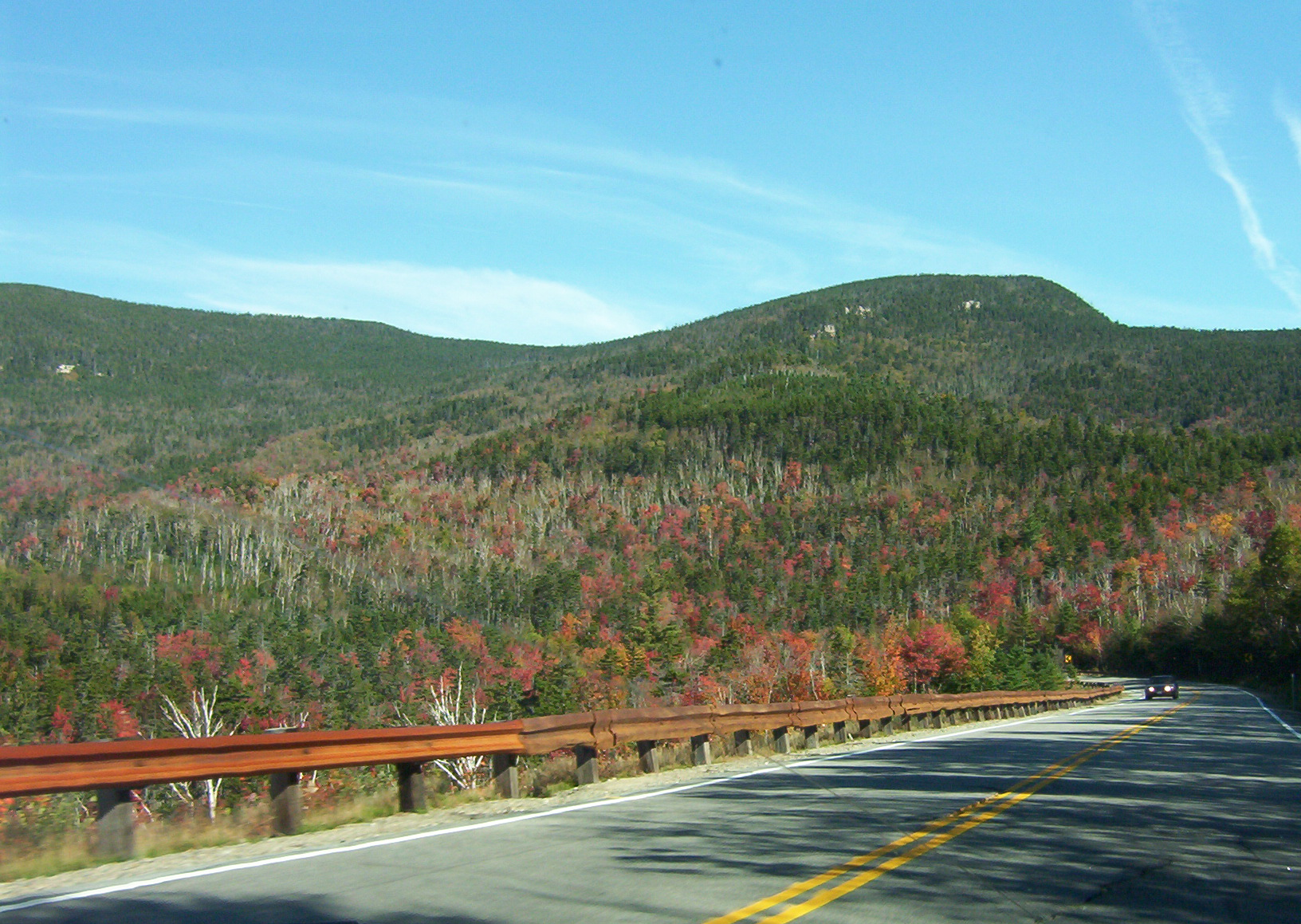
Kancamagus Highway

The Kancamagus Highway opened in August 1959, after two dead-end stretches of road were linked, creating a connection between US 3 in Lincoln and NH 16 in Conway. Locally known as "The Kanc" or "The Kank", the road was paved in 1964, and in the winter of 1966–67 it was plowed for the first time.

The highway is named after Kancamagus (pronounced "cain-kah-MAW-gus", "Fearless One"), third and final sagamore of the Penacook Confederacy of Native American tribes. Nephew of Wonalancet and grandson of Passaconaway, Kancamagus ruled what is now southern New Hampshire. After English settlers arrested a number of Pennacook tribe members, he was forced to make the decision in 1691 to move north into upper New Hampshire and what is now Quebec.

On February 9, 2004, University of Massachusetts Amherst student Maura Murray crashed her car on Route 112 near Woodsville. She disappeared shortly after this incident and her fate remains unknown.

Following Hurricane Irene in August 2011, two sections of NH 112 were closed, pending repair work and evaluation of damage. The Kancamagus Highway was closed from the Sabbaday Falls picnic area across Kancamagus Pass to the Discovery Trail parking area in the eastern part of Lincoln. A section of the western portion of NH 112 along the Wild Ammonoosuc River was closed; as of September 6, 2011, a single lane of the western section had been reopened. By late June 2012, the highway was completely reopened, though some stretches were still being repaved.

== Major intersections ==
County	Location	mi	km	Destinations	Notes
Grafton	Bath	0.000	0.000	US 302 / NH 10 (Rum Hill Road) – Woodsville, Bath, Lisbon	Western terminus
Grafton	Easton	8.664	13.943	NH 116 west (Coventry Road) – Benton	Western end of concurrency with NH 116
Grafton	Easton	9.546	15.363	NH 116 east (Easton Road) – Easton, Franconia	Eastern end of concurrency with NH 116
Grafton	Woodstock	17.906	28.817	NH 118 south (Sawyer Highway) – Warren	Northern terminus of NH 118
Grafton	Woodstock	20.471	32.945	US 3 (Main Street) – North Lincoln, Thornton	Village of North Woodstock
Grafton	Woodstock	20.824– 21.172	33.513– 34.073	I-93 (Styles Bridges Highway) – Plymouth, Concord, Franconia Notch, Littleton	Exit 32 on I-93
Carroll	Conway	56.387	90.746	NH 16 / NH 113 (Main Street) – Conway, Ossipee, Rochester	Eastern terminus
1.000 mi = 1.609 km; 1.000 km = 0.621 mi: Concurrency terminus

== Images along the highway ==
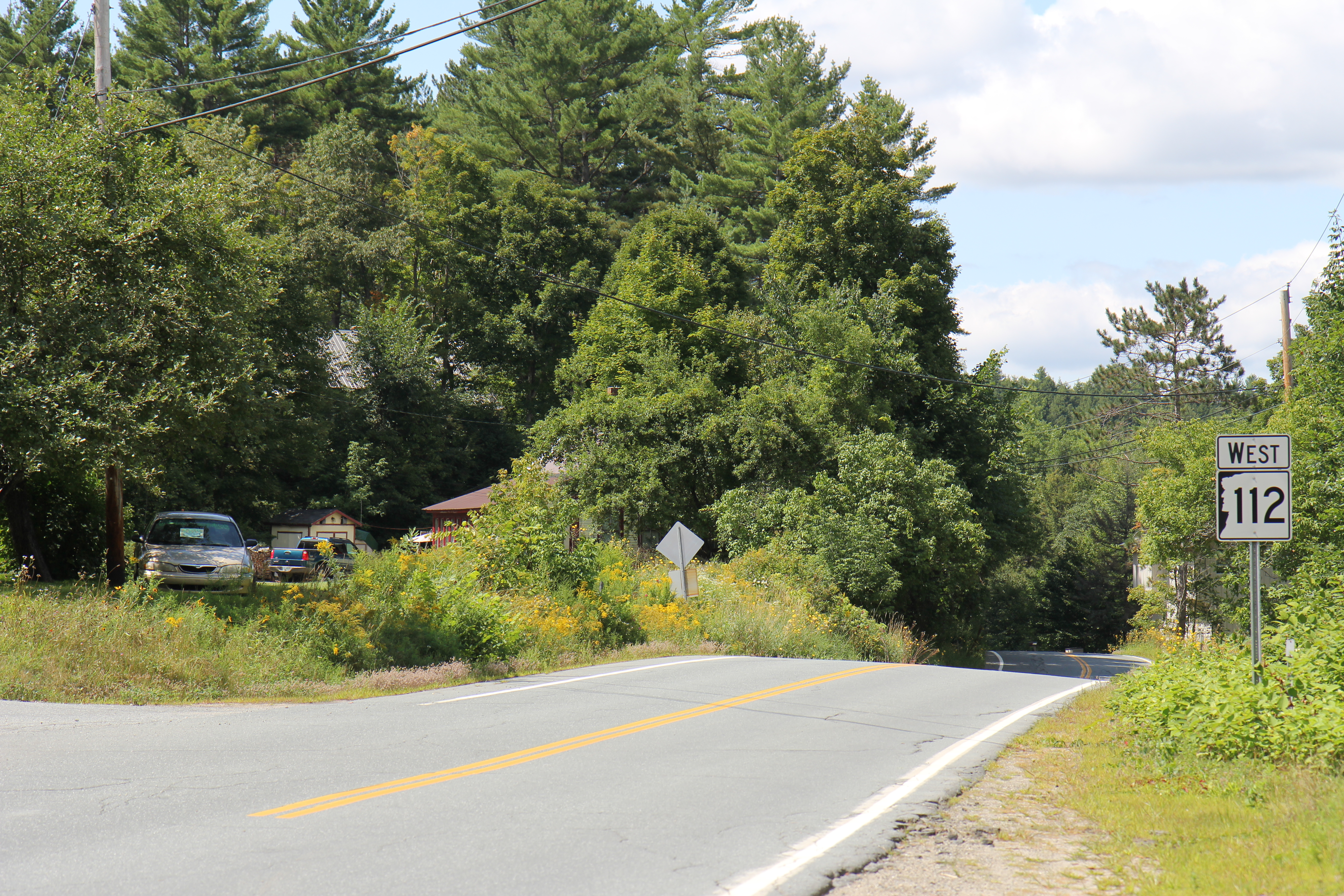
At intersection of Cemetery Rd in Swiftwater, about two miles east of its western terminus at US 302

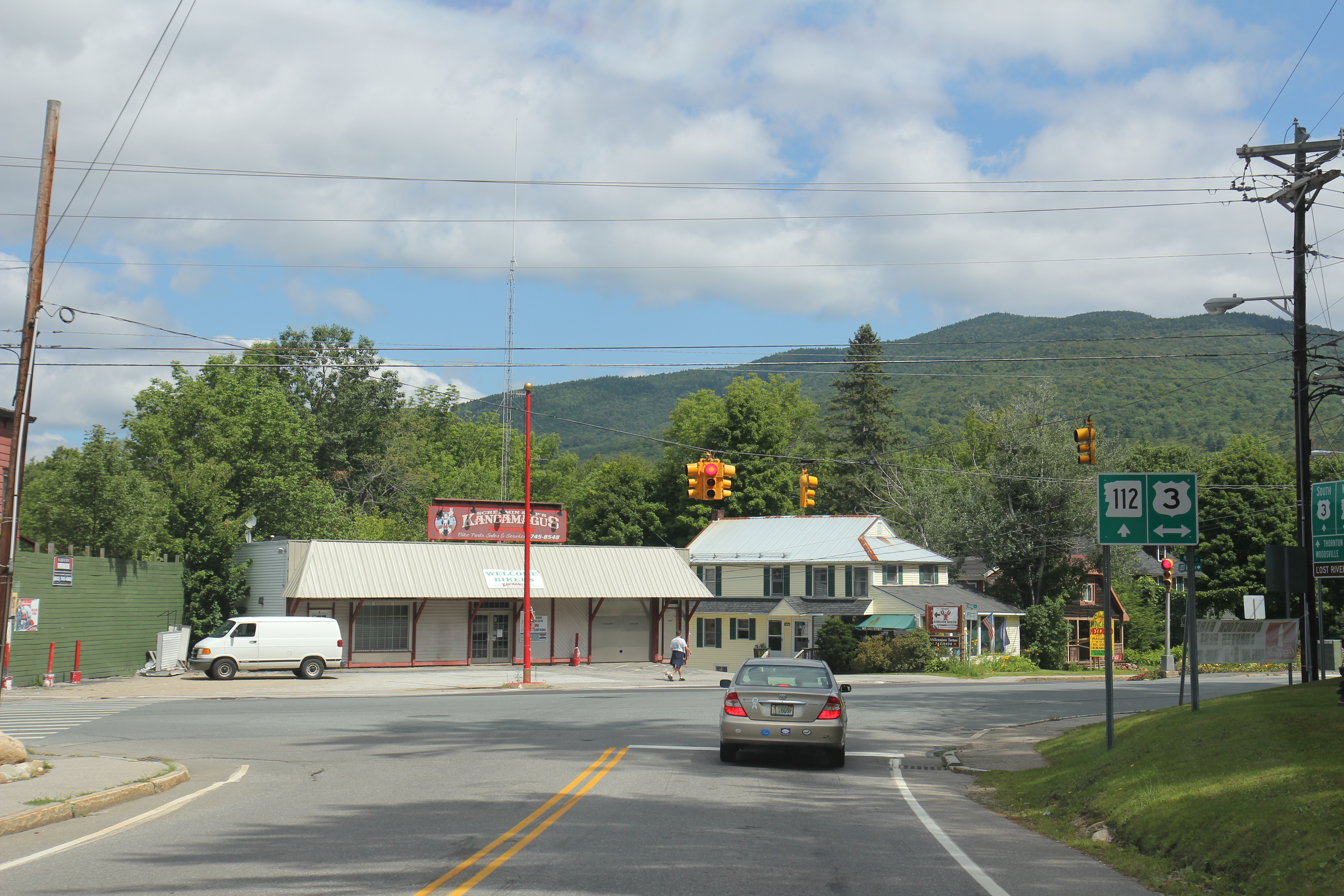
Intersection with US 3

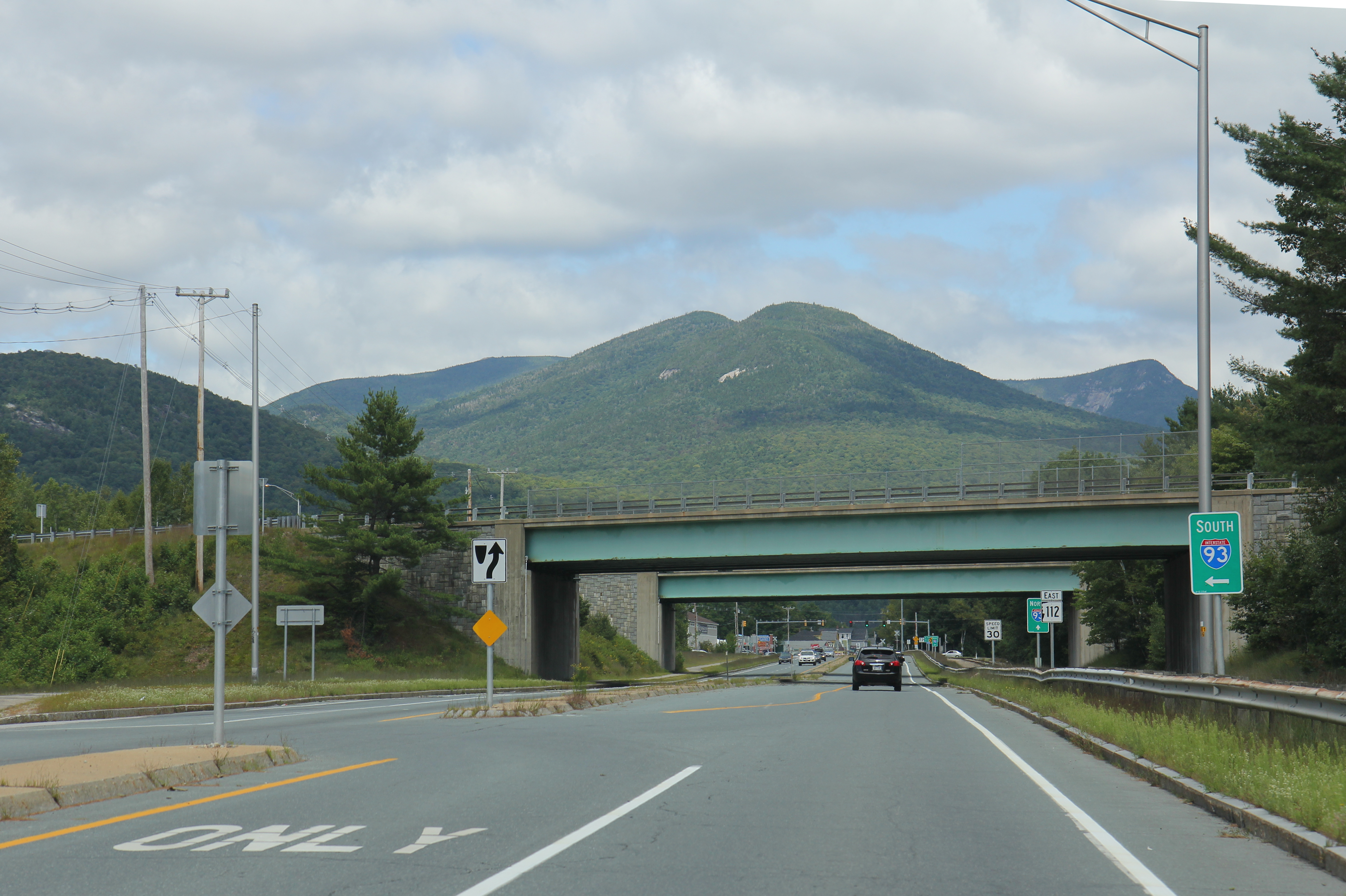
Intersection with I-93
