= Pemigewasset River =

River in New Hampshire, United States

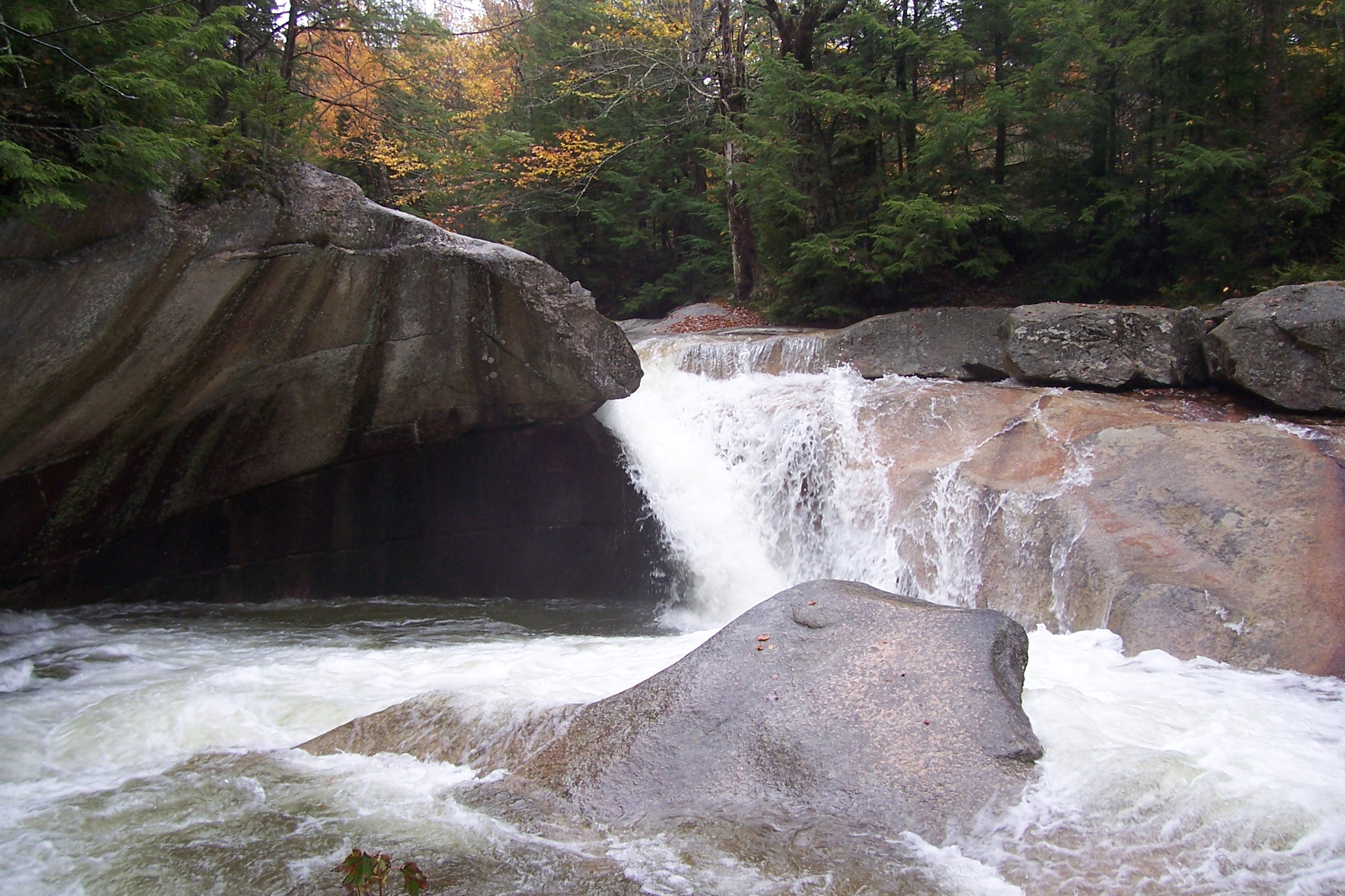
- The Pemigewasset River descends into the Basin in Franconia Notch.

- Location within New Hampshire Location within the United States

Location
- Country: United States
- State: New Hampshire
- Counties: Grafton, Belknap, Merrimack
- Towns and city: Franconia, Lincoln, Woodstock, Thornton, Campton, Plymouth, Holderness, Ashland, Bridgewater, New Hampton, Bristol, Hill, Sanbornton, Franklin

Physical characteristics
- Source: Franconia Notch
  - location: Franconia
  - coordinates: 44°10′18″N 71°41′14″W
  - elevation: 1,980 ft (600 m)
- Mouth: Merrimack River
  - location: Franklin
  - coordinates: 43°26′11″N 71°38′54″W
  - elevation: 262 ft (80 m)
- Length: 65.0 mi (104.6 km)

Basin features
- Tributaries
  - left: Flume Brook, East Branch Pemigewasset River, Mad River, Beebe River, Squam River, Salmon Brook, Winnipesaukee River
  - right: Moosilauke Brook, Hubbard Brook, West Branch Brook, Baker River, Newfound River, Smith River, Chance Pond Brook

The Pemigewasset River /ˌpɛmɪdʒəˈwɑːsɪt/, known locally as "The Pemi", is a river in the state of New Hampshire, the United States. It is 65.0 miles (104.6 km) in length and (with its tributaries) drains approximately 1,021 square miles (2,644 km^{2}). The name "Pemigewasset" comes from the Abenaki word bemijijoasek [bəmidzidzoasək], meaning "where side (entering) current is".

== Geography ==
The Pemigewasset originates at Profile Lake in Franconia Notch State Park, in the town of Franconia. It flows south through the White Mountains and merges with the Winnipesaukee River to form the Merrimack River at Franklin. The Merrimack then flows through southern New Hampshire, northeastern Massachusetts and into the Atlantic Ocean.

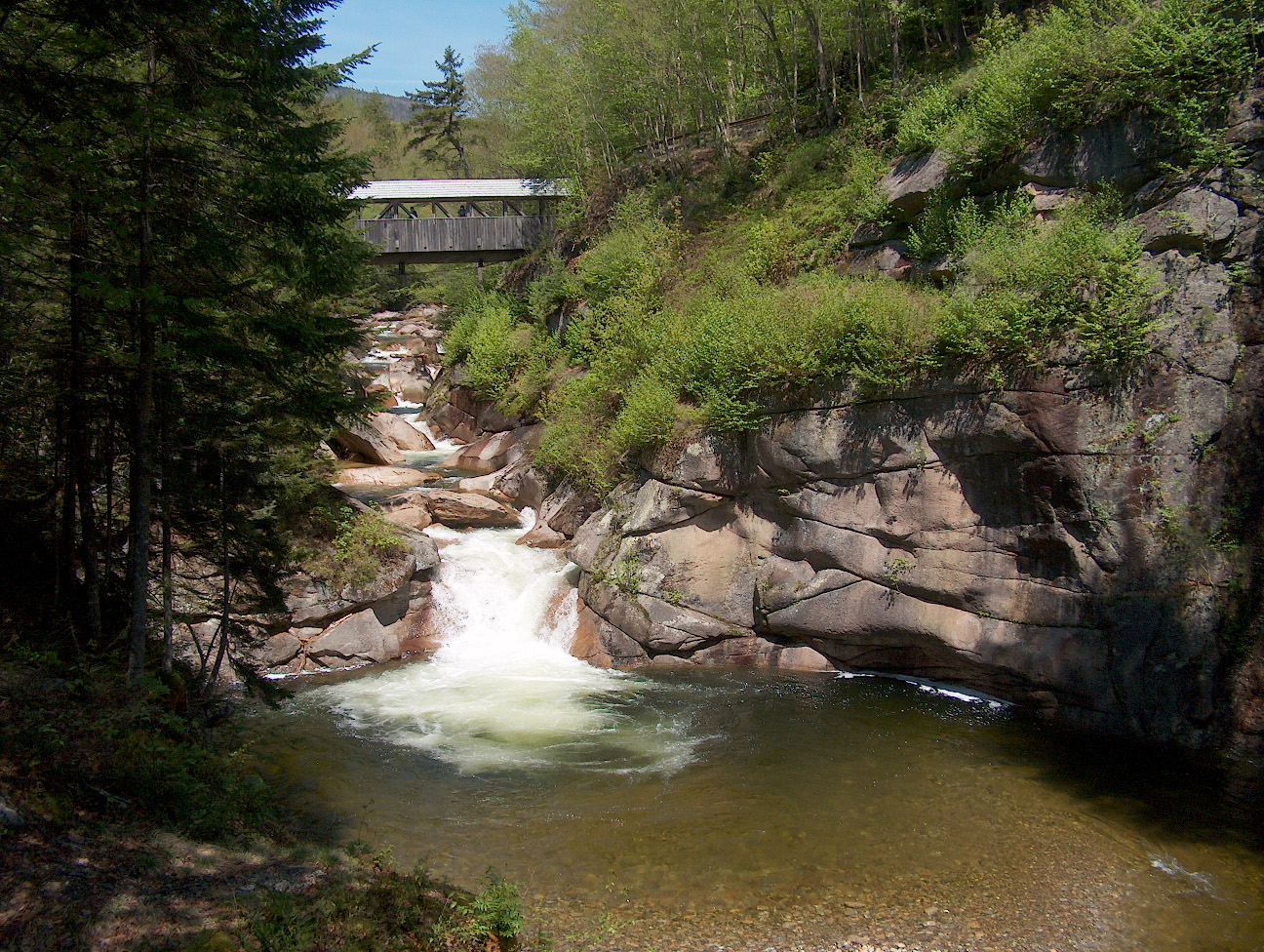
The Sentinel Pine bridge and The Pool in Franconia Notch

The Interstate 93 highway runs parallel with the river between Franconia Notch and New Hampton. The river passes through the communities of Lincoln, North Woodstock, Woodstock, Thornton, Campton, Plymouth, Holderness, Ashland, Bridgewater, Bristol, New Hampton, Hill, Sanbornton, and Franklin.

The river descends over waterfalls in Franconia Notch, including "The Basin", passes cascades in North Woodstock, and drops over Livermore Falls north of Plymouth. The remainder of the northern Pemi, from Lincoln to Ashland, passes over copious gravel bars and attracts numerous boaters and fishermen. Below Ashland, the river is impounded by the Ayers Island Dam, a hydroelectric facility, for over five miles. A short stretch of heavy whitewater is found below the dam, before the river reaches the impoundment zone for the Franklin Falls flood control reservoir. The river crosses one additional hydroelectric dam below Franklin Falls before joining the Winnipesaukee River in the center of Franklin, becoming the Merrimack River.

The Pemigewasset watershed consists of over 1,100 miles (1,800 km) of rivers and 17,000 acres (69 km^{2}) of lake, pond, and reservoir area. The watershed comprises about 20 percent of the Merrimack's total watershed area.

== Tributaries ==
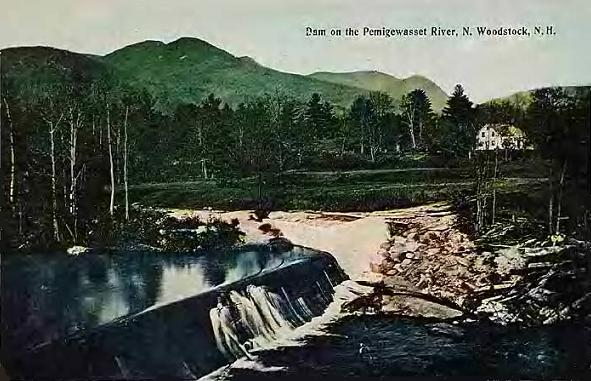
Dam on the Pemigewasset River in 1912, Woodstock, NH

Major tributaries include (from north to south):

- East Branch of the Pemigewasset River. The East Branch is larger and longer than the main branch of the river.
- Moosilauke Brook (Lost River)
- Mad River
- Beebe River
- Baker River
- Squam River (outlet of Squam Lake)
- Newfound River (outlet of Newfound Lake)
- Smith River

== See also ==
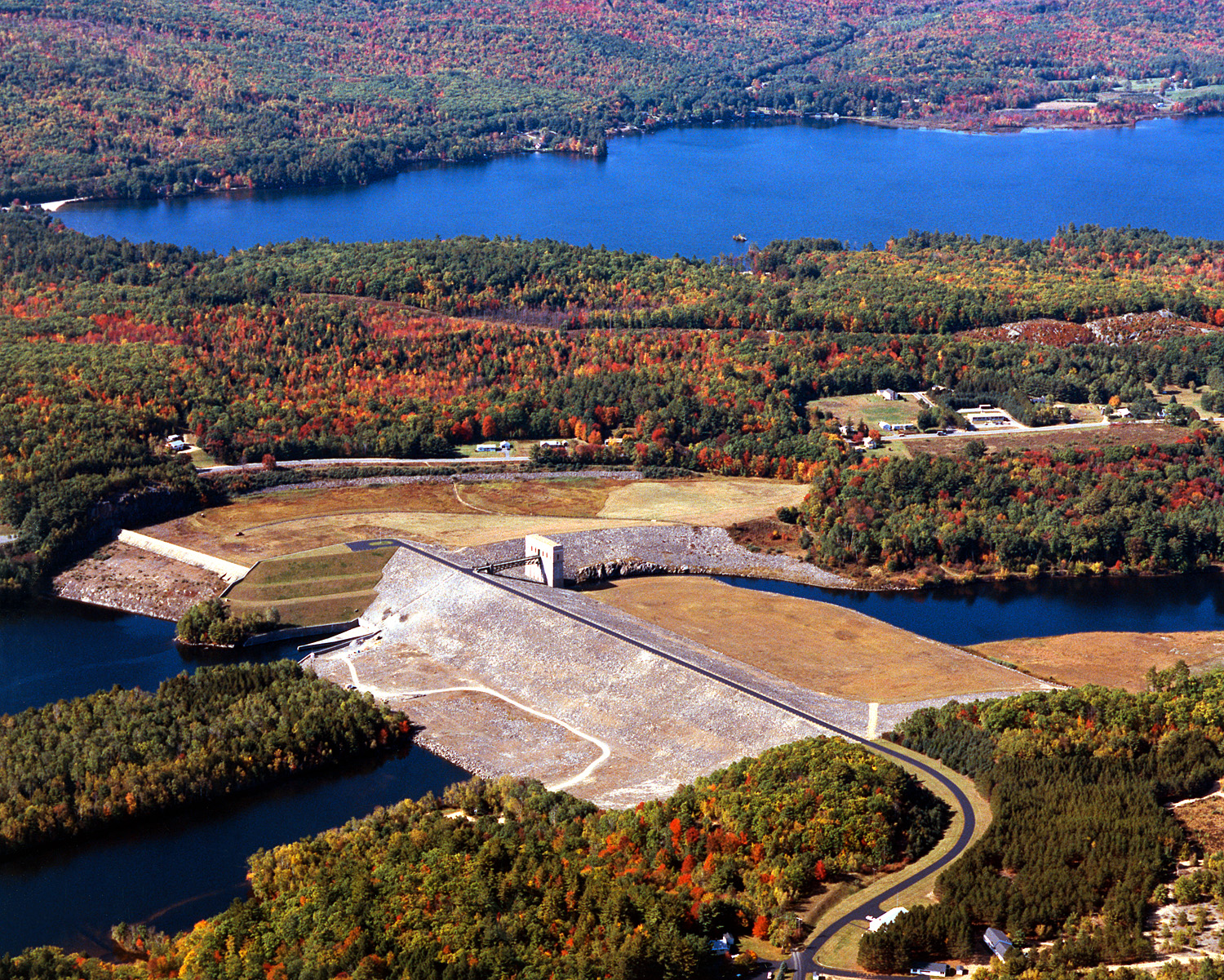
Franklin Falls Dam on the Pemigewasset River in Merrimack County. Webster Lake in the background is a separate water body.

- List of New Hampshire rivers
