= North Woodstock, New Hampshire =

Census-designated place in New Hampshire, United States

- Census-designated place
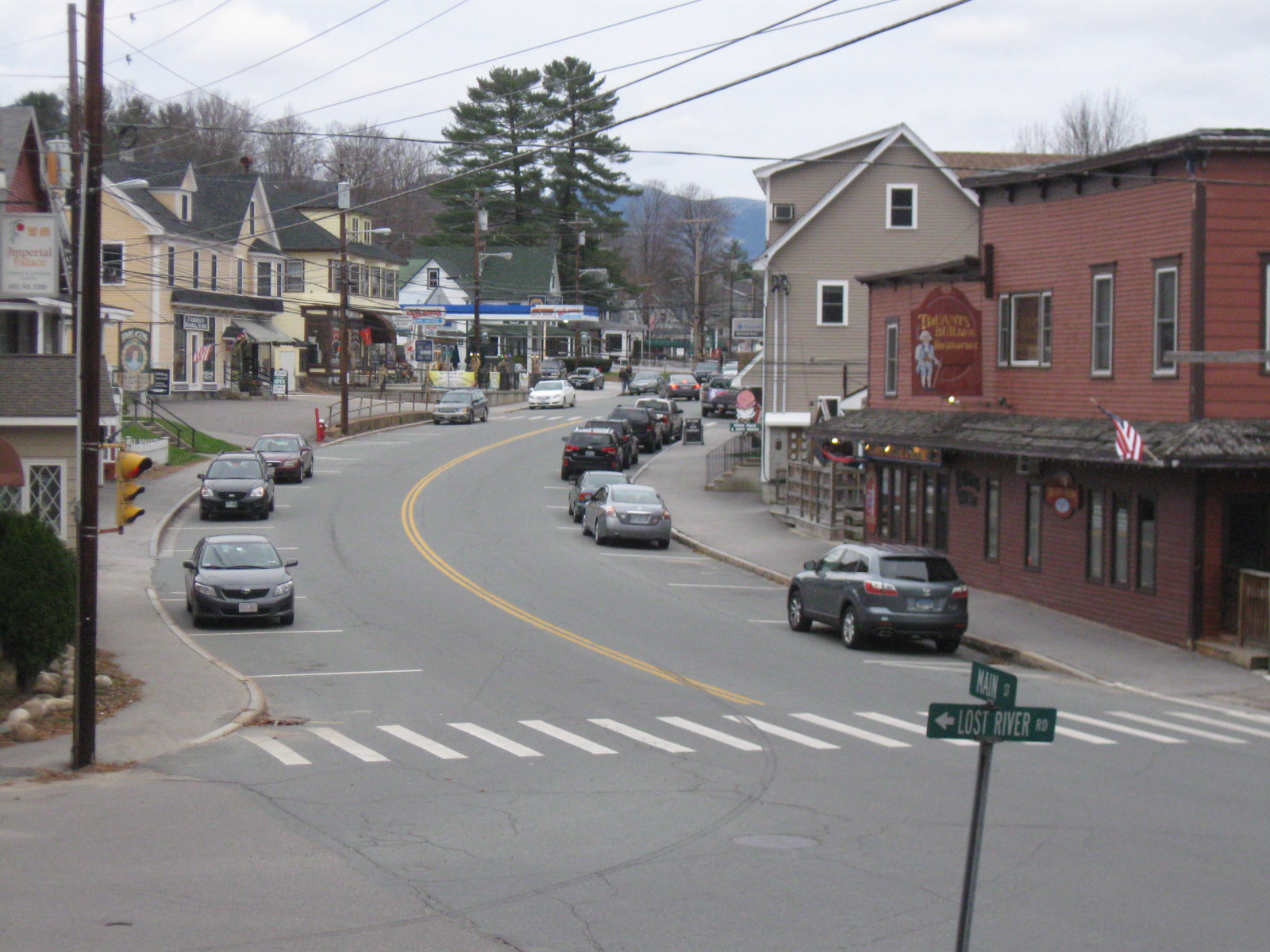
- Main Street in North Woodstock

- Location within New Hampshire Location within the United States
- Coordinates: 44°01′49″N 71°41′09″W
- Country: United States
- State: New Hampshire
- County: Grafton
- Town: Woodstock

Area
  - Total: 1.65 sq mi (4.28 km^{2})
  - Land: 1.61 sq mi (4.18 km^{2})
  - Water: 0.035 sq mi (0.09 km^{2})
- Elevation: 771 ft (235 m)

Population (2020)
  - Total: 739
  - Density: 457/sq mi (176.6/km^{2})
- Time zone: UTC-5 (Eastern (EST))
  - Summer (DST): UTC-4 (EDT)
- ZIP code: 03262
- Area code: 603
- FIPS code: 33-57220
- GNIS feature ID: 2629736

North Woodstock is a census-designated place (CDP) and the primary village in the town of Woodstock, New Hampshire, United States. It had a population of 739 at the 2020 census.

== Geography ==
It is located along the northern boundary of the town of Woodstock, adjacent to the town of Lincoln. The village is centered on the intersection of U.S. Route 3 (Main Street) and New Hampshire Route 112 (Lost River Road/Kancamagus Highway). Interstate 93 passes through the east portion of the village, with access from Exit 32 (NH 112). I-93 leads south 21 miles (34 km) to Plymouth and north through Franconia Notch 23 miles (37 km) to Littleton. NH 112 leads east on the Kancamagus Highway 36 miles (58 km) to Conway and west through Kinsman Notch 24 miles (39 km) to Woodsville. US-3 is a local road that runs parallel to I-93.

The Pemigewasset River flows past the center of North Woodstock, joined by the East Branch of the Pemigewasset and Moosilauke Brook at the southern limits of the village. According to the U.S. Census Bureau, the North Woodstock CDP has a total area of 1.7 square miles (4.3 km^{2}), of which 0.04 square miles (0.1 km^{2}), or 2.17%, is water.

== Demographics ==
Historical population
Census	Pop.	Note	%±
2010	528		—
2020	739		40.0%
U.S. Decennial Census

North Woodstock

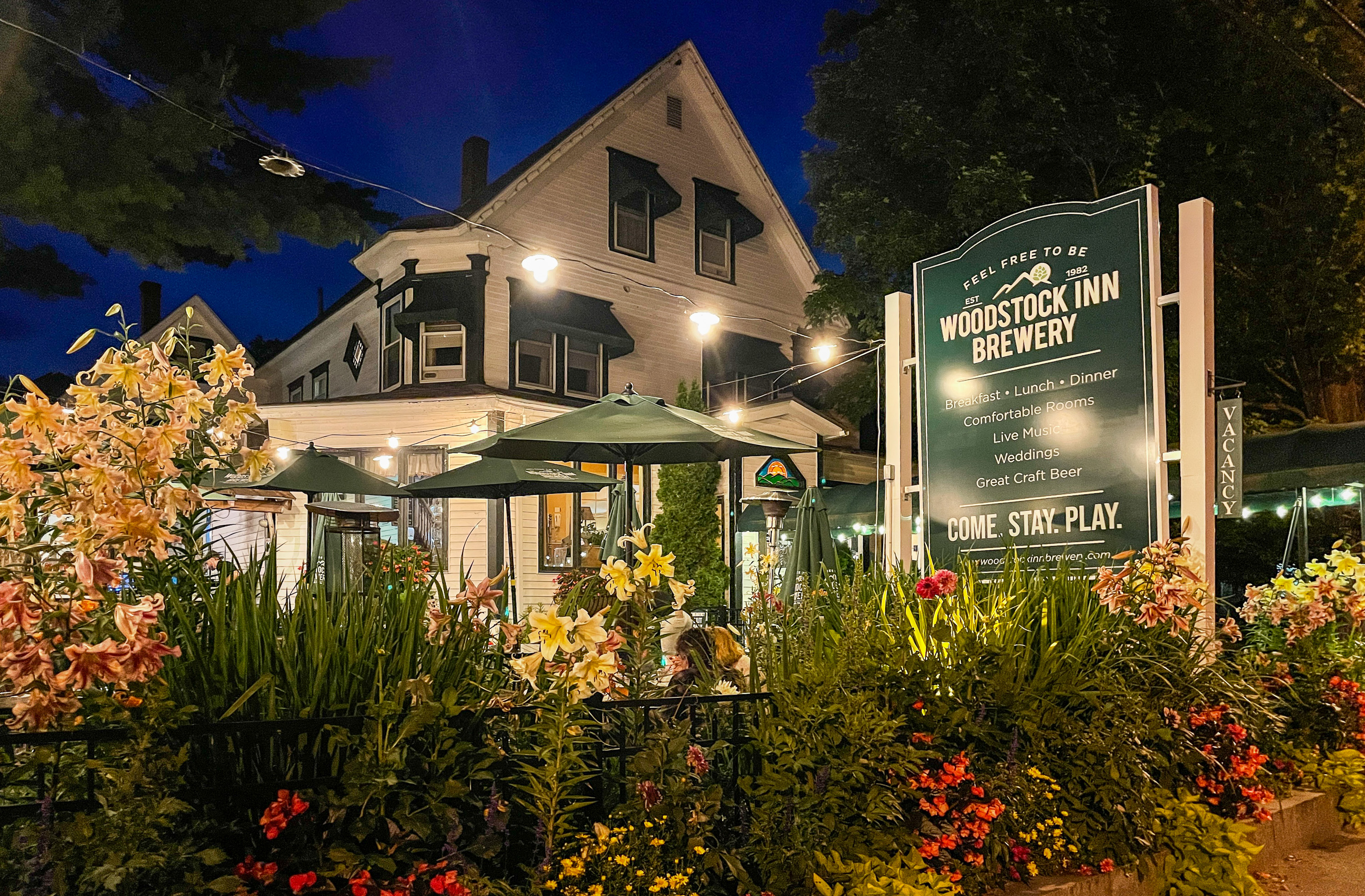
Woodstock Inn Brewery

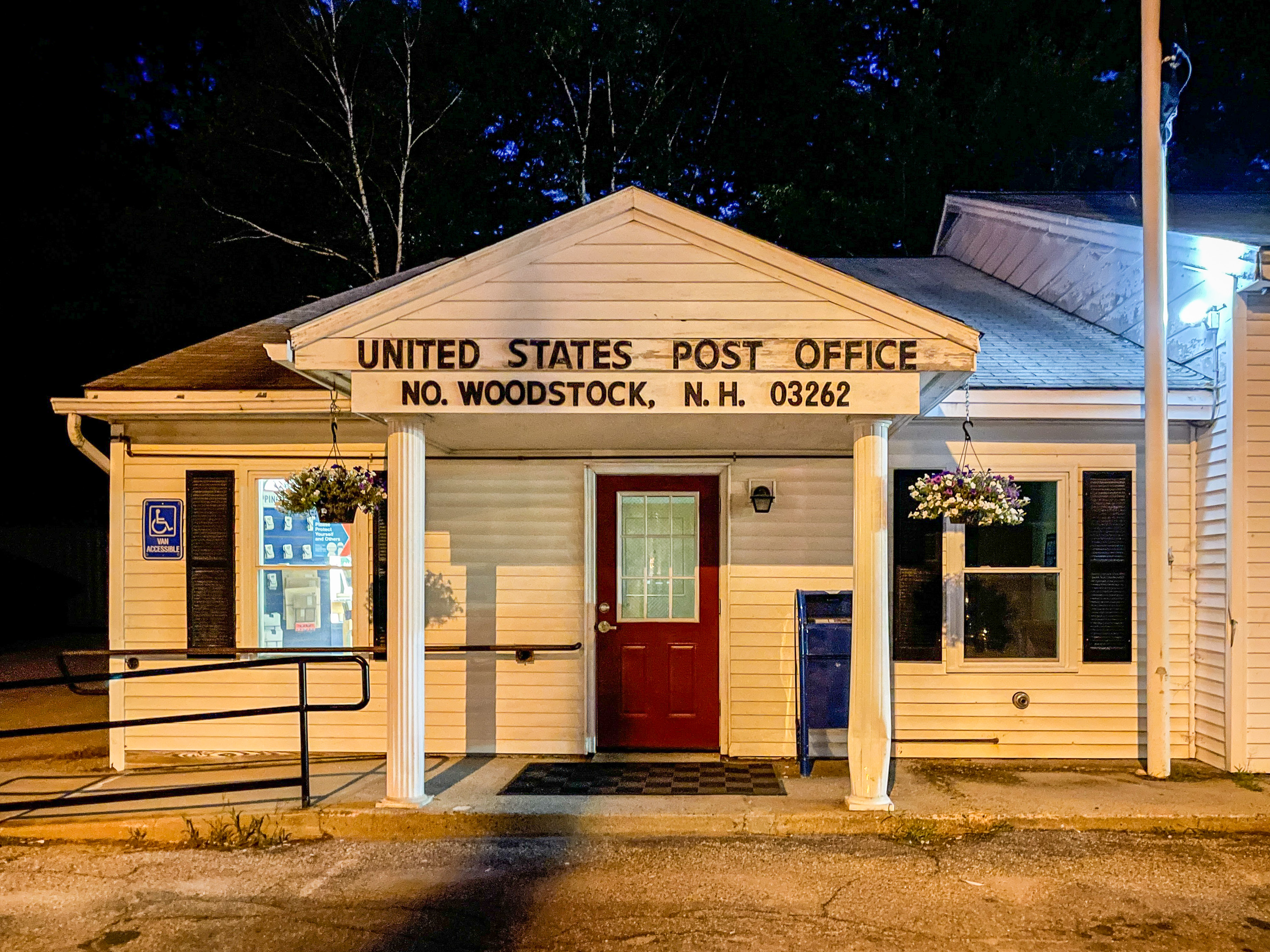
North Woodstock post office

As of the census of 2010, there were 528 people, 256 households, and 131 families residing in the CDP. There were 759 housing units, of which 503, or 66.3%, were vacant on Census Day (April 1). 480 of the vacant units were seasonal or vacation properties. The racial makeup of the CDP was 96.8% white, 0.2% African American, 0.2% Native American, 1.1% Asian, 0.0% Pacific Islander, 0.0% some other race, and 1.7% from two or more races. 0.0% of the population were Hispanic or Latino of any race.

Of the 256 households in the CDP, 20.3% had children under the age of 18 living with them, 39.1% were headed by married couples living together, 7.4% had a female householder with no husband present, and 48.8% were non-families. 36.3% of all households were made up of individuals, and 6.7% were someone living alone who was 65 years of age or older. The average household size was 2.06, and the average family size was 2.72.

17.2% of residents in the CDP were under the age of 18, 7.8% were from age 18 to 24, 26.1% were from 25 to 44, 32.8% were from 45 to 64, and 16.1% were 65 years of age or older. The median age was 44.5 years. For every 100 females, there were 98.5 males. For every 100 females age 18 and over, there were 97.7 males.

For the period 2011–15, the estimated median annual income for a household was $40,083, and the median income for a family was $42,292. The per capita income for the CDP was $32,940.
