= Woodstock, New Hampshire =

- Town
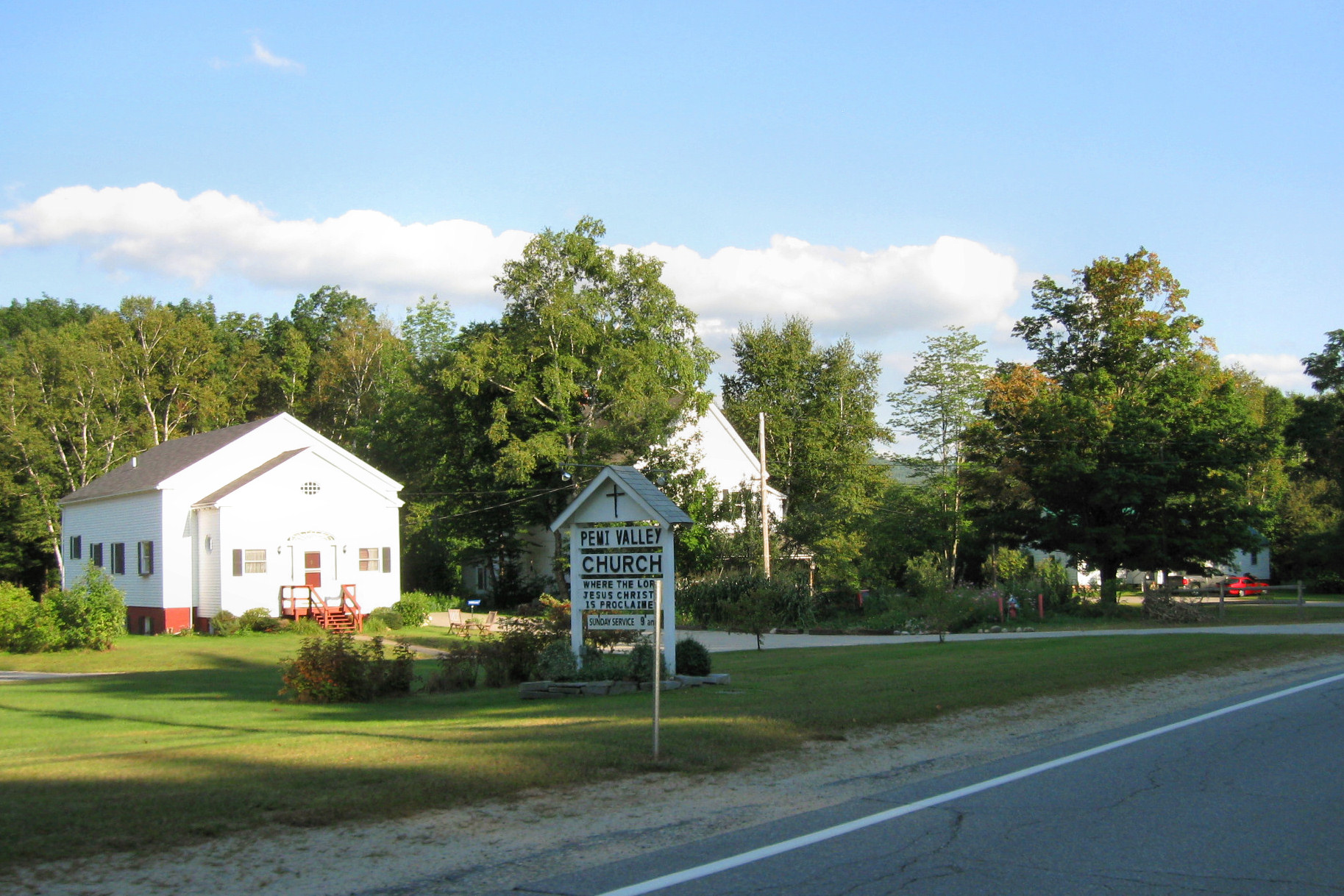
- Street scene in Woodstock

- Seal

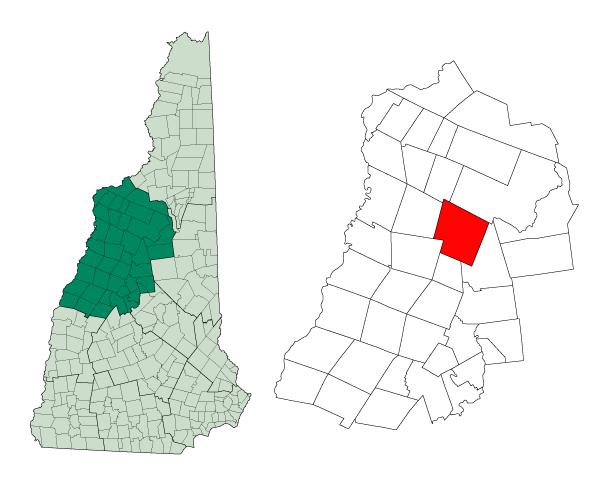
- Location in Grafton County, New Hampshire
- Coordinates: 43°59′50″N 71°44′12″W
- Country: United States
- State: New Hampshire
- County: Grafton
- Incorporated: 1763
- Villages: Woodstock; North Woodstock

Area
  - Total: 59.3 sq mi (153.6 km^{2})
  - Land: 58.8 sq mi (152.2 km^{2})
  - Water: 0.54 sq mi (1.4 km^{2}) 0.93%
- Elevation: 1,837 ft (560 m)

Population (2020)
  - Total: 1,434
  - Density: 24/sq mi (9.4/km^{2})
- Time zone: UTC−5 (Eastern)
  - Summer (DST): UTC−4 (Eastern)
- ZIP Codes: 03262 (North Woodstock); 03293 (Woodstock)
- Area code: 603
- FIPS code: 33-87060
- GNIS feature ID: 873761
- Website: www.woodstocknh.gov

Woodstock is a town in Grafton County, New Hampshire, United States. The population was 1,434 at the 2020 census. Woodstock includes the village of North Woodstock, the commercial center. Its extensive land area is largely forested, and includes the Hubbard Brook Experimental Forest. Parts of the White Mountain National Forest are in the east and west. The Appalachian Trail crosses the town's northwestern corner. Russell Pond Campground is in the east. West of North Woodstock is the Lost River Reservation.

== History ==
First granted in 1763, colonial Governor Benning Wentworth named the town "Peeling" after an English town. Many of the first colonists were originally from Lebanon, Connecticut. In 1771, his nephew, Governor John Wentworth, gave it the name "Fairfield", after Fairfield, Connecticut. The town was renamed "Woodstock" in 1840 for Blenheim Palace in Woodstock, Oxfordshire, England, possibly due to the popularity of the 1826 Walter Scott novel Woodstock.

Logging became a principal early industry, with sawmills established using water power from the Pemigewasset River. The entrance of the railroad in the 19th century opened the wilderness to development, carrying away wood products to market. It also brought tourists, many attracted by paintings of the region by White Mountain artists. Several inns and hotels were built to accommodate the wealthy, who sought relief from the summer heat, humidity and pollution of coal-age Boston, Hartford, New York and Philadelphia. They often relaxed by taking carriage rides through the White Mountains, or by exploring along the Lost River in the Lost River Reservation. But with the advent of automobiles, patrons were no longer restricted by the limits of rail service. Consequently, many grand hotels established near depots declined and closed. North Woodstock, however, remains a popular tourist destination.

The Hubbard Brook Experimental Forest, an outdoor laboratory for ecological studies founded by the United States Forest Service in 1955, is located in the southern part of town.

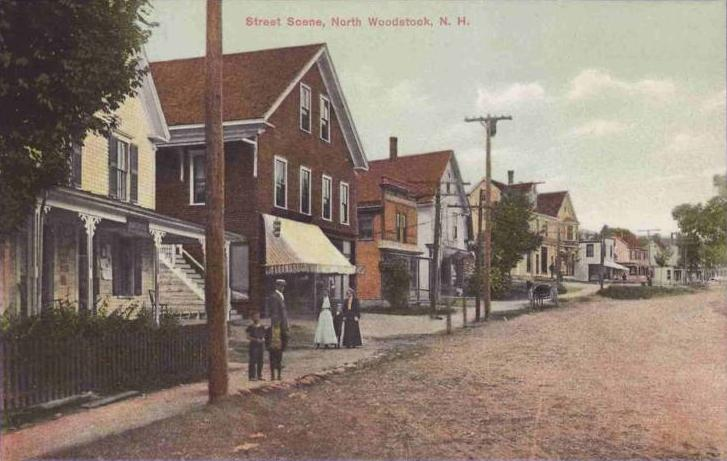
Street scene c. 1910

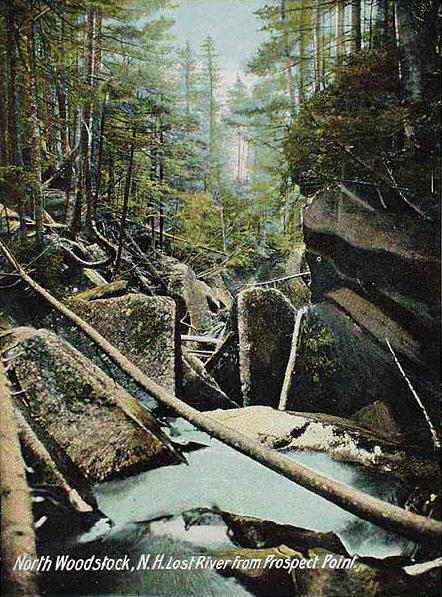
Lost River c. 1908

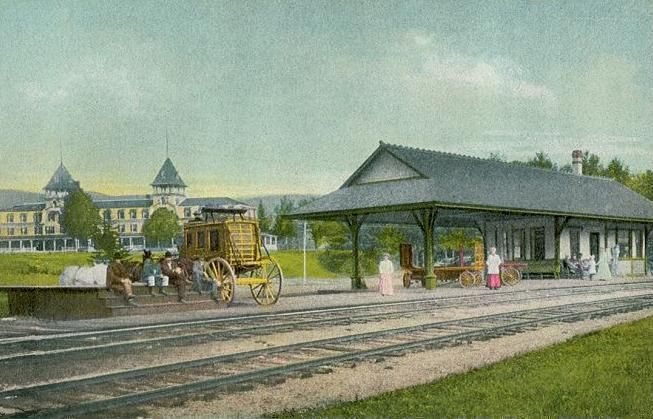
Deer Park Hotel c. 1908

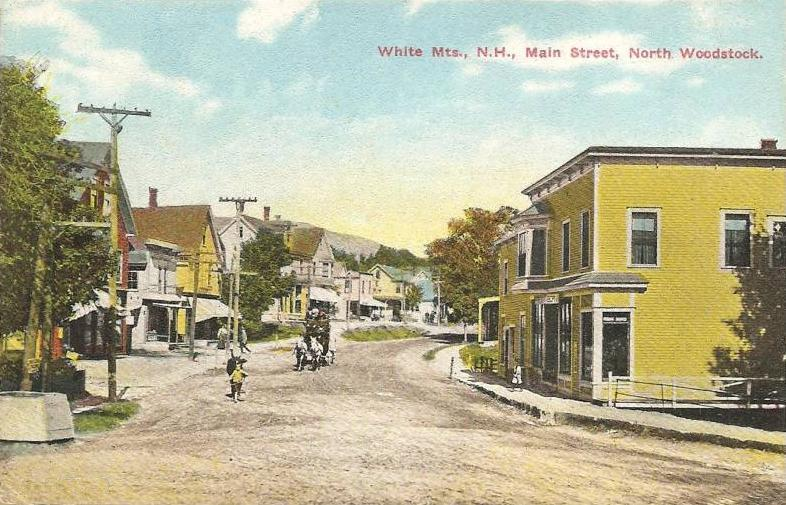
Main Street in 1916

== Geography ==
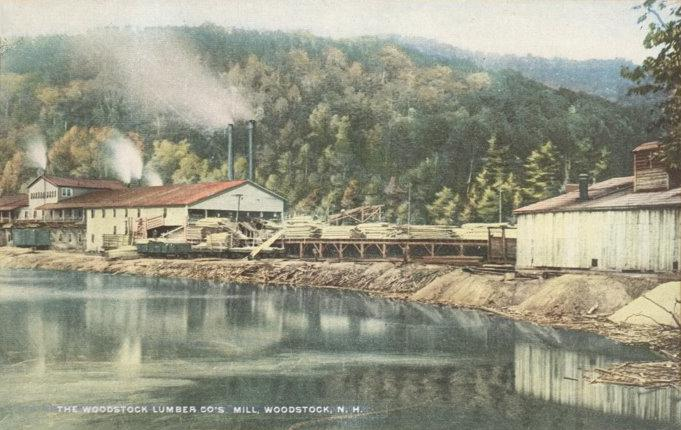
Woodstock Lumber Co. c. 1915

Woodstock is in the White Mountains region of northern New Hampshire, close to the geographic center of Grafton County. According to the U.S. Census Bureau, the town has a total area of 59.3 square miles (153.6 km^{2}), of which 58.8 square miles (152.2 km^{2}) are land and 0.54 square miles (1.4 km^{2}) are water, comprising 0.93% of the town. Woodstock is drained by the Pemigewasset River, which crosses the eastern side of town. Tributaries of the Pemigewasset in Woodstock include Hubbard Brook, Glover Brook, Moosilauke Brook and its tributary the Lost River, and the East Branch Pemigewasset River. The highest point in Woodstock is the summit of Mount Jim near the western border of the town, at 4,172 feet (1,272 m) above sea level, a spur of Mount Moosilauke.

Woodstock is crossed by Interstate 93, U.S. Route 3, and state routes 112 and 175.

== Demographics ==
North Woodstock

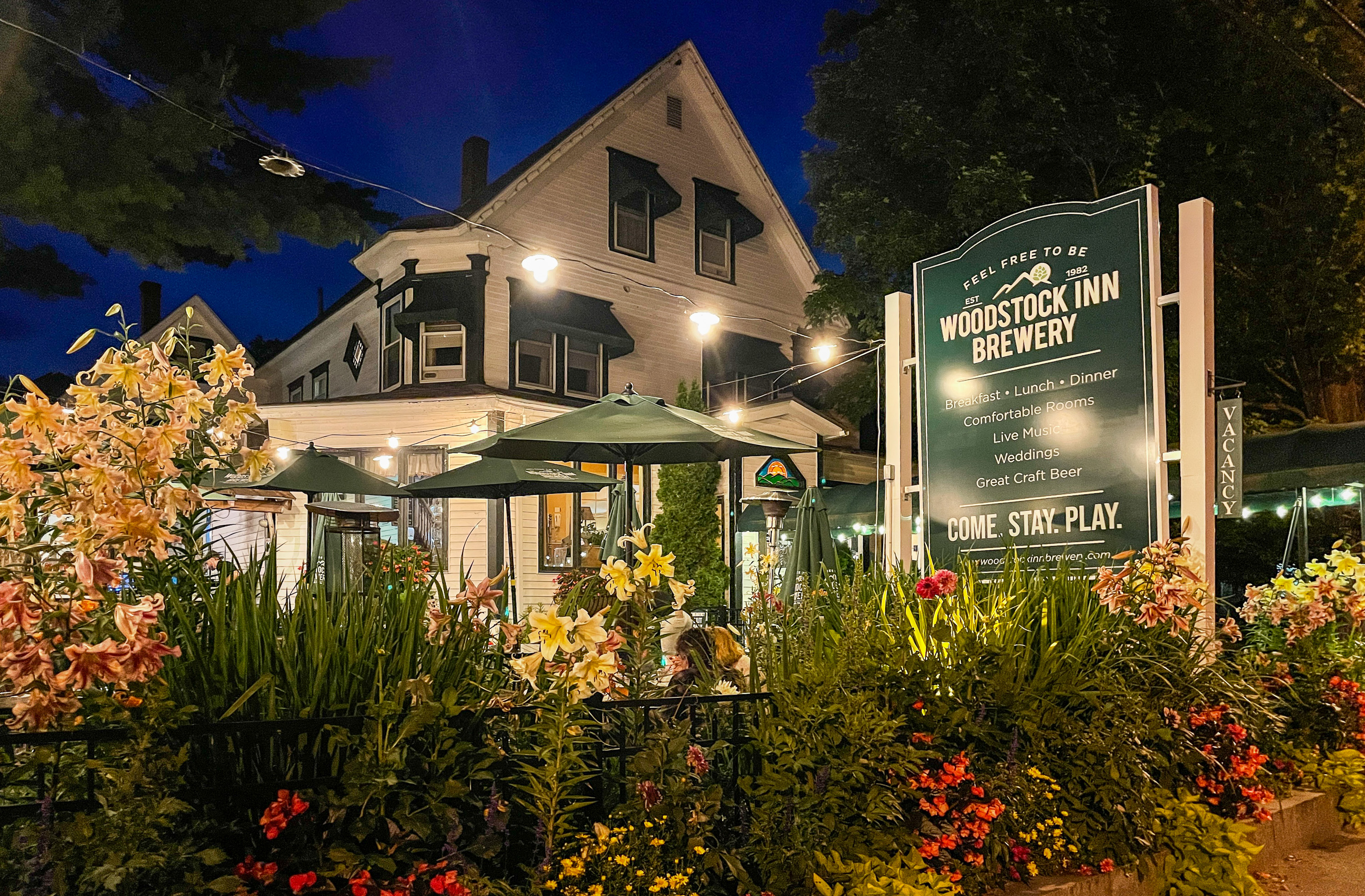
Woodstock Inn Brewery

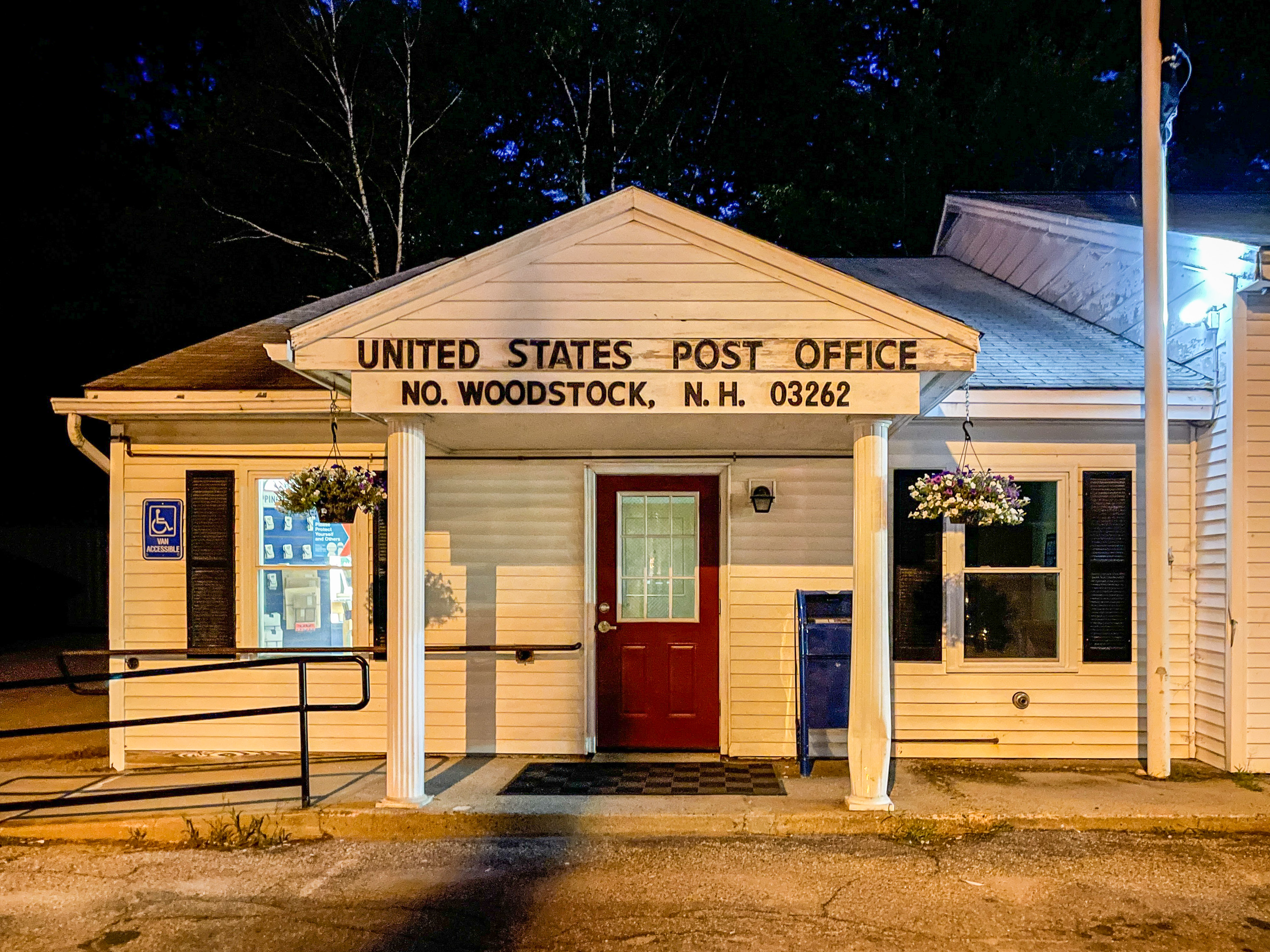
North Woodstock post office

Historical population
Census	Pop.	Note	%±
1840	472		—
1850	418		−11.4%
1860	476		13.9%
1870	405		−14.9%
1880	367		−9.4%
1890	341		−7.1%
1900	628		84.2%
1910	1,083		72.5%
1920	684		−36.8%
1930	756		10.5%
1940	981		29.8%
1950	894		−8.9%
1960	827		−7.5%
1970	897		8.5%
1980	1,008		12.4%
1990	1,167		15.8%
2000	1,139		−2.4%
2010	1,374		20.6%
2020	1,434		4.4%
U.S. Decennial Census

As of the census of 2010, there were 1,374 people, 624 households, and 353 families residing in the town. There were 1,421 housing units, of which 797, or 56.1%, were vacant. 701 of the vacant units were for seasonal or recreational use. The racial makeup of the town was 96.9% White, 0.1% African American, 0.2% Native American, 0.9% Asian, 0.1% Native Hawaiian or Pacific Islander, 0.1% some other race, and 1.8% from two or more races. 0.3% of the population were Hispanic or Latino of any race.

Of the 624 households, 25.5% had children under the age of 18 living with them, 43.6% were headed by married couples living together, 8.5% had a female householder with no husband present, and 43.4% were non-families. 31.6% of all households were made up of individuals, and 9.2% were someone living alone who was 65 years of age or older. The average household size was 2.20, and the average family size was 2.77.

In the town, 19.2% of the population were under the age of 18, 7.9% were from 18 to 24, 24.2% from 25 to 44, 32.2% from 45 to 64, and 16.4% were 65 years of age or older. The median age was 44.2 years. For every 100 females, there were 102.1 males. For every 100 females age 18 and over, there were 101.5 males.

For the period 2011–2015, the estimated median annual income for a household was $49,063, and the median income for a family was $62,500. Male full-time workers had a median income of $33,750 versus $44,034 for females. The per capita income for the town was $30,671. 8.0% of the population and 2.4% of families were below the poverty line. 7.5% of the population under the age of 18 and 5.0% of those 65 or older were living in poverty.
