= New Hampshire Route 117 =

State highway in Grafton County, New Hampshire, US

New Hampshire Route 117
- Sugar Hill Road
- Map of Grafton County in northwestern New Hampshire with NH 117 highlighted in red

Route information
- Maintained by NHDOT
- Length: 8.095 mi (13.028 km)

Major junctions
- West end: US 302 / NH 10 in Lisbon
- East end: NH 18 / NH 116 in Franconia

Location
- Country: United States
- State: New Hampshire
- Counties: Grafton

Highway system
- New Hampshire Highway System; Interstate; US; State; Turnpikes
← NH 116	→ NH 118

New Hampshire Route 117 (abbreviated NH 117) is an 8.095-mile-long (13.028 km) east–west highway in northern New Hampshire. NH 117 runs from Franconia to Lisbon in the White Mountains Region.

The eastern terminus of NH 117 is at New Hampshire Route 18 and New Hampshire Route 116 in Franconia, where NH 117 is named Sugar Hill Road. The western terminus of NH 117 is in Lisbon at U.S. Route 302 and New Hampshire Route 10.

== Major intersections ==
The entire route is in Grafton County.

Location	mi	km	Destinations	Notes
Lisbon	0.000	0.000	US 302 / NH 10 – Lisbon, Littleton	
Franconia	8.095	13.028	NH 18 / NH 116 – Littleton, Franconia, Easton	
1.000 mi = 1.609 km; 1.000 km = 0.621 mi
