= NH 117 =

NH 117 may refer to:

- National Highway 117 (India)
- New Hampshire Route 117, United States
