= Richard T. Trelfa =

American politician

Member of the New Hampshire House of Representatives from the Grafton 2nd district
- In office 1990–1998

Personal details
- Born: July 5, 1918 Alpena, Michigan, U.S.
- Died: April 6, 2005 (aged 86)
- Party: Republican
- Education: University of Michigan

Richard T. Trelfa (July 5, 1918 – April 6, 2005) was an American politician. He served as a Republican member for the Grafton 2nd district of the New Hampshire House of Representatives.

== Life and career ==
Trelfa was born in Alpena, Michigan. He attended the University of Michigan.

In 1990, Trelfa defeated Dorothy E. Blodgett in the general election for the Grafton 2nd district of the New Hampshire House of Representatives, winning 77 percent of the votes. He then went on to be re-elected in 1992, 1994 and finally again in 1996 unopposed.

Trelfa died on April 6, 2005, at the age of 86 at regional hospital in Littleton, New Hampshire and was survived by his wife and three sons.
