= List of United States federal courthouses in New Hampshire =

Following is a list of current and former courthouses of the United States federal court system located in New Hampshire. Each entry indicates the name of the building along with an image, if available, its location and the jurisdiction it covers, the dates during which it was used for each such jurisdiction, and, if applicable the person for whom it was named, and the date of renaming. Dates of use will not necessarily correspond with the dates of construction or demolition of a building, as pre-existing structures may be adapted or court use, and former court buildings may later be put to other uses. Also, the official name of the building may be changed at some point after its use as a federal court building has been initiated.

== Courthouses ==
| Courthouse | City | Image | Street address | Jurisdiction | Dates of use | Named for |
|---|---|---|---|---|---|---|
| U.S. Post Office & Court House† | Concord | | 33 North State Street | D.N.H. | 1889–1967; Now the state's Legislative Office Building. | n/a |
| James C. Cleveland Federal Building and Courthouse | Concord | | 53 Pleasant Street | D.N.H. | 1968–1997 | U.S. Representative James C. Cleveland |
| Warren B. Rudman U.S. Courthouse | Concord | | 55 Pleasant Street | D.N.H. | 1997–present | U.S. Senator Warren Rudman |
| U.S. Post Office & Court House^{†} | Littleton | | 134 Main St. | D.N.H. | 1935–1982; Still in use as a post office. | n/a |
| U.S. Custom House & Post Office | Portsmouth | | 40 Pleasant Street | D.N.H. | 1860–1926; Now privately owned. | n/a |

== Key ==
| ^{†} | Listed on the National Register of Historic Places (NRHP) |
| ^{††} | NRHP-listed and also designated as a National Historic Landmark |
