= Dr. Edgar Everett Dean House =

Historic house in Massachusetts, United States

- U.S. National Register of Historic Places
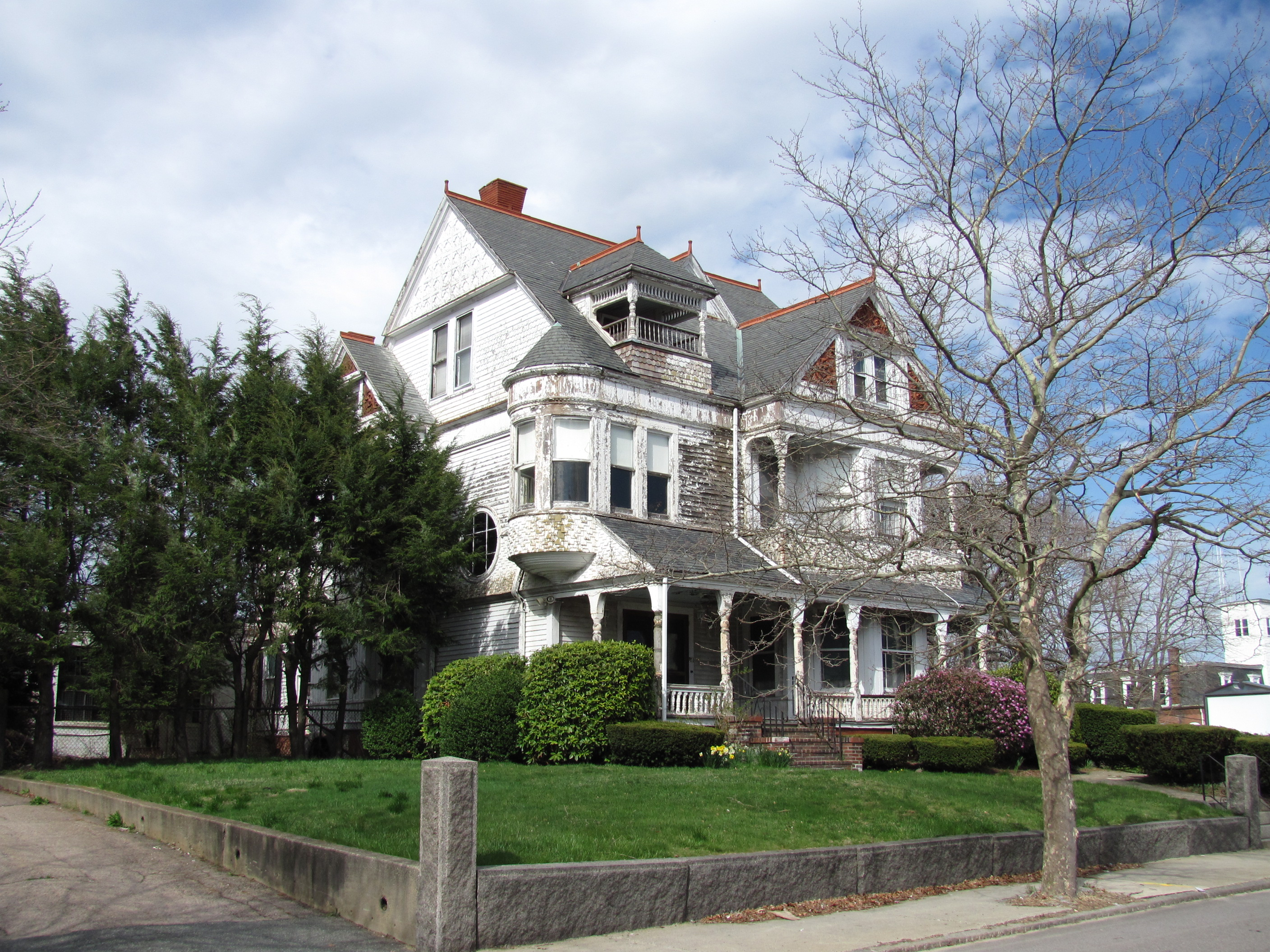
- Dr. Edgar Everett Dean House

- Location within Massachusetts Location within the United States
- Interactive map showing the location of Dr. Edgar Everett Dean House
- Location: Brockton, Massachusetts
- Coordinates: 42°5′5″N 71°1′22″W
- Built: 1884
- Architect: Wesley Lyng Minor
- Architectural style: Queen Anne
- NRHP reference No.: 78000471
- Added to NRHP: May 5, 1978

The Dr. Edgar Everett Dean House is a historic house located at 81 Green Street in Brockton, Massachusetts.

== Description and history ==
The 3-story wood-frame house was built in 1884 for Doctor Edgar Everett Dean, a prominent local physician. The Queen Anne Victorian is one of the few surviving residential designs of the locally prominent architect Wesley Lyng Minor, whose credits also include Brockton City Hall. From 1939 to 1993, the building was home to the Hall Funeral Home.

The house was listed on the National Register of Historic Places in 1978.

== See also ==
- National Register of Historic Places listings in Plymouth County, Massachusetts
