= W. V. Howard =

American architect

- Born: Waldo Vose Howard; October 2, 1841; Norton, Massachusetts
- Died: November 20, 1927 (aged 86)
- Occupation: Architect
- Practice: W. V. Howard; Howard & Austin
- Buildings: Central Fire Station; Littleton Town Hall; Moses A. Packard House; Washburn Library; Brockton Armory

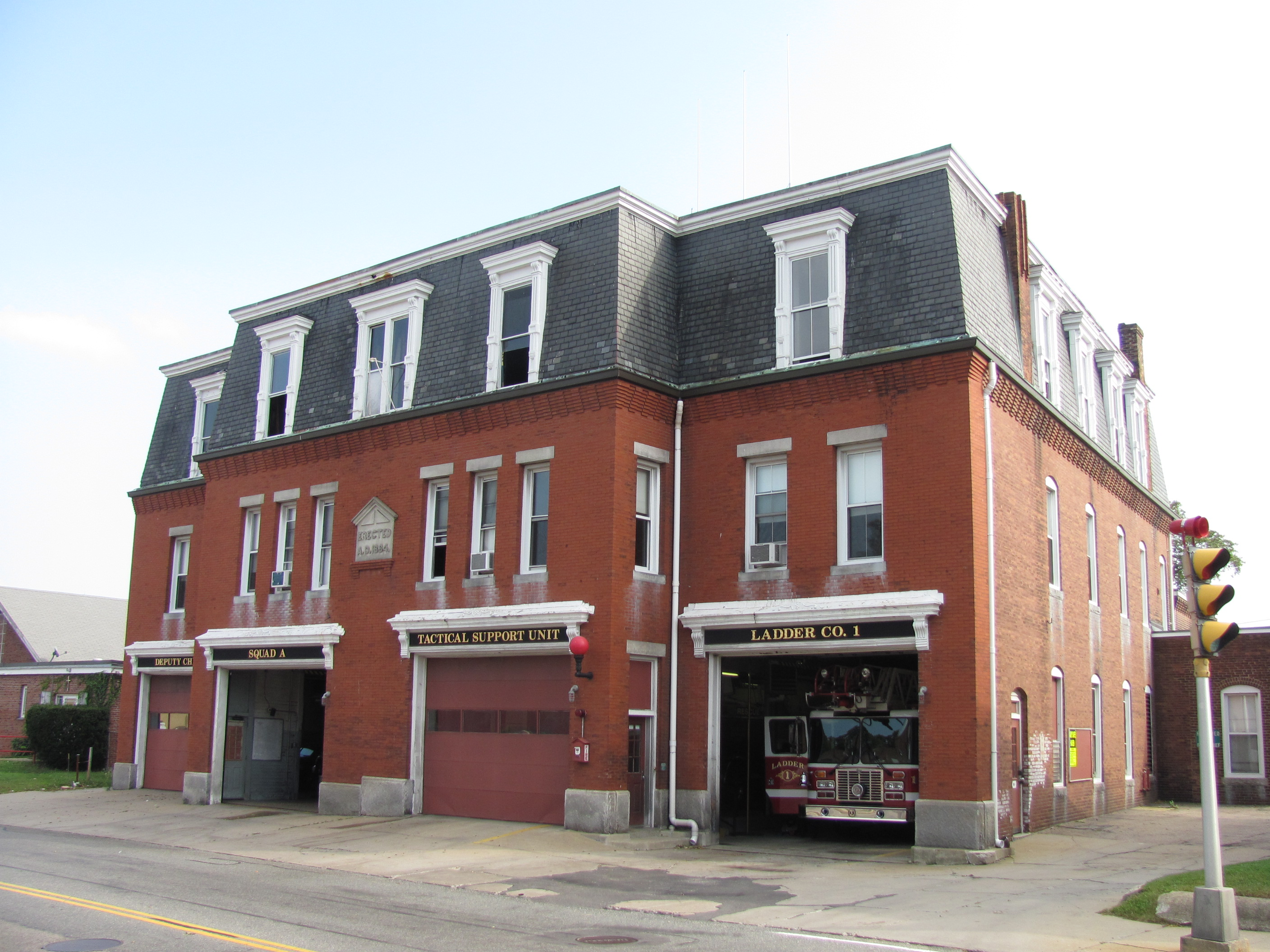
Central Fire Station, Brockton, 1884.

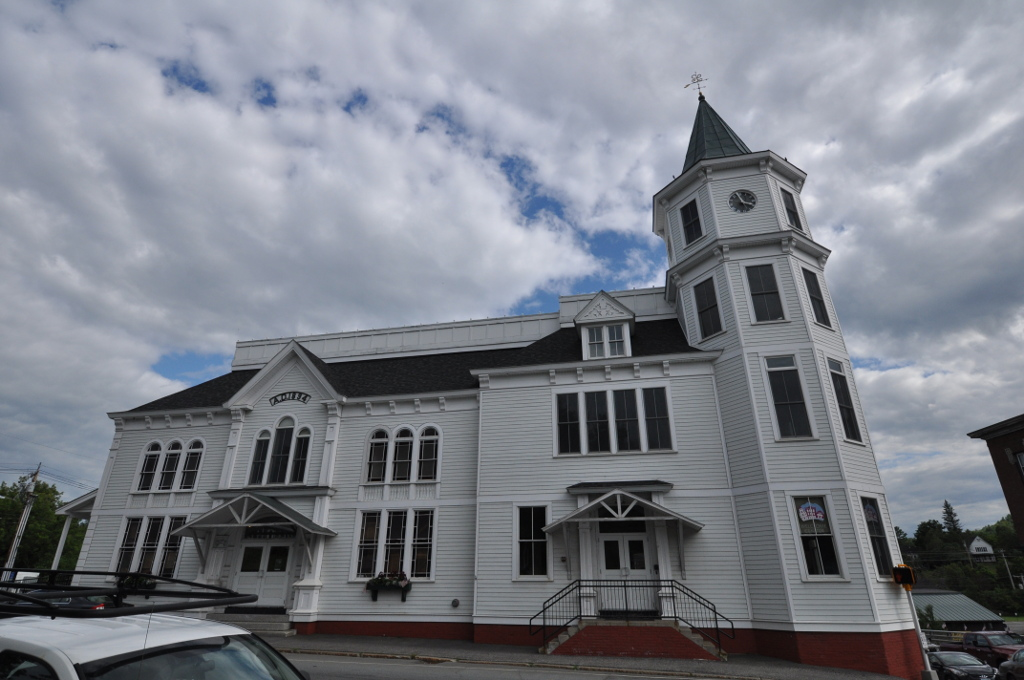
Littleton Town Hall, Littleton, 1894.

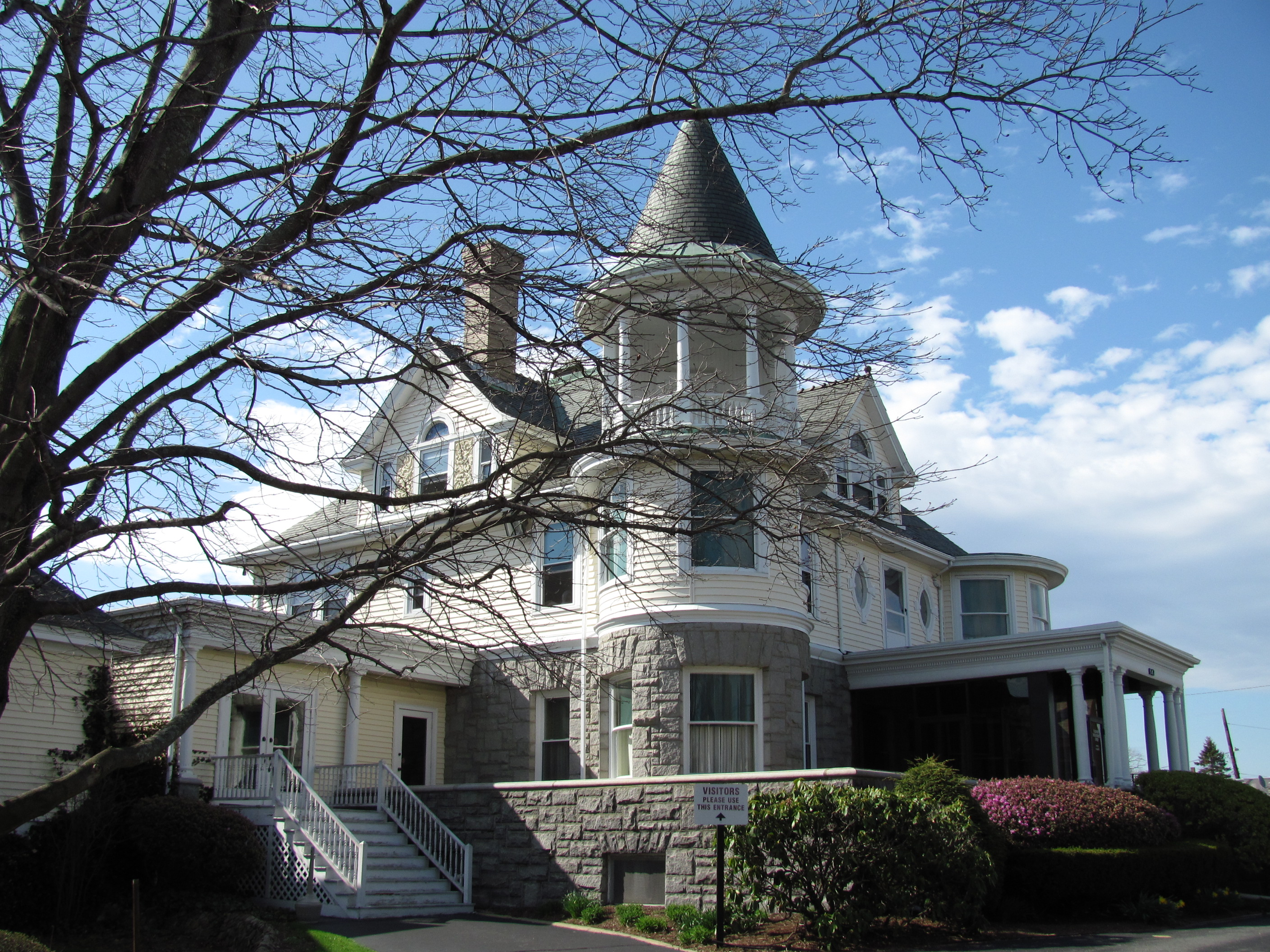
M. A. Packard House, Brockton, 1896-1897

Waldo Vose Howard (October 2, 1841 – November 20, 1927) was an American architect practicing in the city of Brockton, Massachusetts and its suburbs.

== Life ==
Howard was born in 1841 in Norton, Massachusetts. His father, Linus, was a farmer. In 1881, W. V. Howard married Mary (Eaton) Nutter, of Amesbury. They had no children. He had opened his office by 1882. In 1889, he took Fred T. Austin as partner in the firm of Howard & Austin. Austin left in 1896 to work alone, before becoming the partner of Charles A. Brigham (Austin & Brigham) in Boston that same year. In later life, Howard was appointed City Architect of Brockton. Howard died in 1927.

Howard was fairly prolific in Plymouth County, and was competent in the major late-nineteenth century styles. Howard worked in Brockton during the 1880s and 90s, with its population more than quadrupling during his career. He and fellow Brockton architect Wesley Lyng Minor designed most of the city's major structures during that period.

== Architectural works ==
=== W. V. Howard, until 1889 ===
- 1882 - Aaron M. Herrod House, 772 N. Main St, Brockton, Massachusetts
  - Demolished.
- 1882 - Robbins B. Grover House, 336 Main St, Brockton, Massachusetts
  - Demolished.
- 1883 - Joslyn Block, 23 Centre St, Brockton, Massachusetts
  - Demolished.
- 1884 - Central Fire Station, 40 Pleasant St, Brockton, Massachusetts.
- 1889 - First Universalist Church, 34 Cottage St, Brockton, Massachusetts

=== Howard & Austin, 1889-1896 ===
- 1889 - Kingman Block, 142 Main St, Brockton, Massachusetts
  - Replaced by Martin & Hall's Kennedy Building in 1916.
- 1890 - Gardner Block, 62 Centre St, Brockton, Massachusetts.
  - Demolished in 2013.
- 1894 - Littleton Town Hall, 125 Main St, Littleton, New Hampshire
- 1896 - Hyannis Yacht Club, Pleasant St, Hyannis, Massachusetts
  - Demolished.
- 1896 - Moses A. Packard House, 647 Main St, Brockton, Massachusetts.

=== W. V. Howard, after 1896 ===
- 1896 - Washburn Library, 32 Union St, East Bridgewater, Massachusetts
- 1897 - William L. Wright House, 162 Highland St, Brockton, Massachusetts
- 1898 - Fire Station No. 3, 914 N Main St, Brockton, Massachusetts.
- 1899 - Jenkins Block, 91 Washington St, Whitman, Massachusetts
  - Upper floors removed after a 1930 fire.
- 1905 - Brockton Armory, 233 Warren Ave, Brockton, Massachusetts
- 1907 - Gifford School, 285 W Main St, Avon, Massachusetts
  - Burned in 1952.
- 1908 - Center School, 155 W Center St, West Bridgewater, Massachusetts
  - Demolished.
- 1914 - Huntington School Annex, 1121 Warren Ave, Brockton, Massachusetts
- 1915 - George S. Paine School, 211 Crescent St, Brockton, Massachusetts
  - Now the Adult Learning Center.
