= United States Post Office and Courthouse–Littleton Main =

- US Post Office and Courthouse-Littleton Main
- U.S. National Register of Historic Places
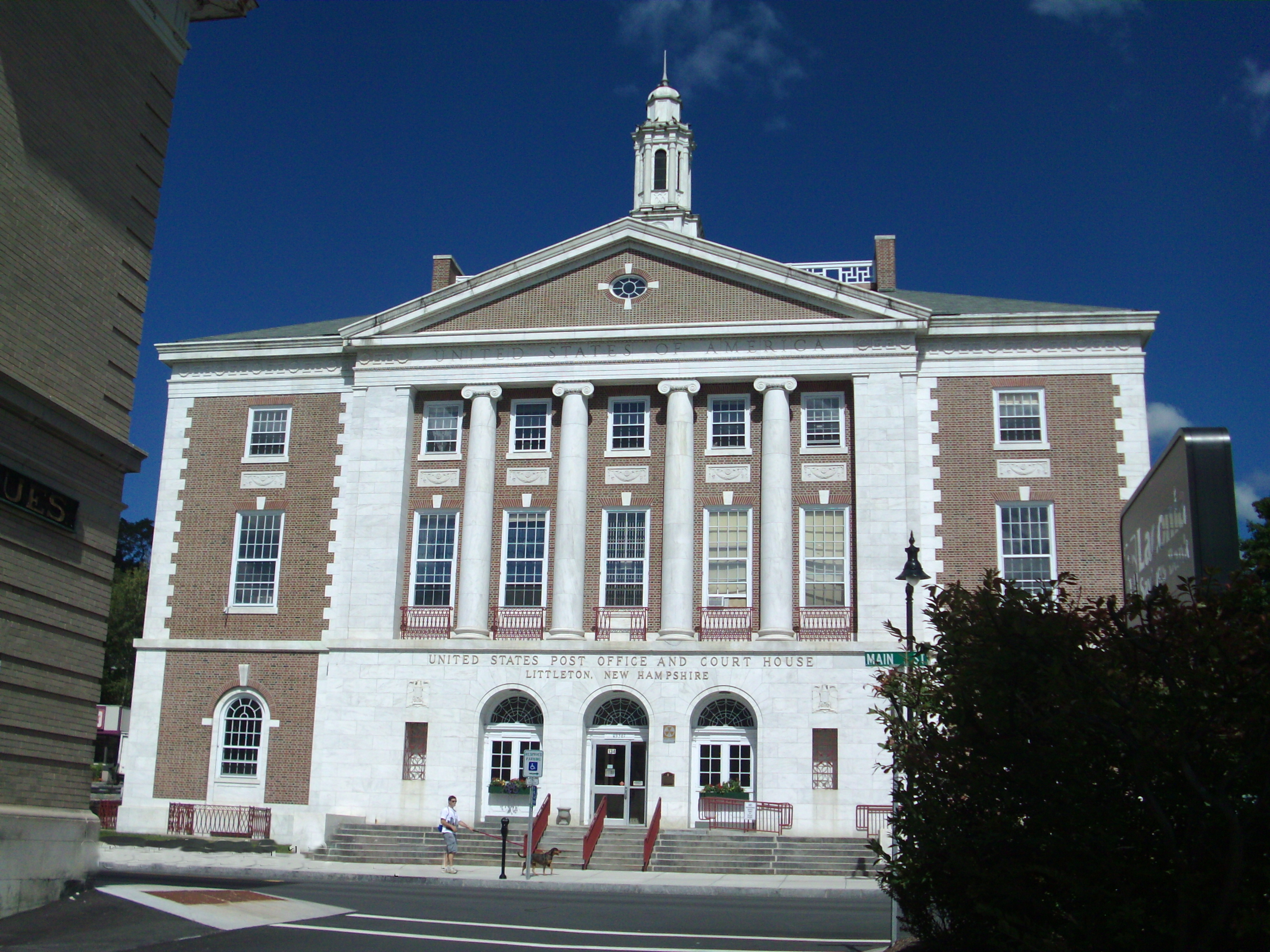

- Location within New Hampshire Location within the United States
- Location: 134 Main St., Littleton, New Hampshire
- Coordinates: 44°18′26″N 71°46′30″W
- Area: 0.8 acres (0.32 ha)
- Built: 1933
- Built by: V & M Construction Co.
- Architect: Office of the Supervising Architect under James A. Wetmore
- NRHP reference No.: 86002251
- Added to NRHP: July 17, 1986

The U.S. Post Office and Courthouse-Littleton Main, now serving as the Littleton Main Post Office and New Hampshire District Court, is a historic federal building at 134 Main Street in Littleton, New Hampshire. Built in 1933, it is one of the more architecturally sophisticated and imposing federal buildings built in New Hampshire in the 20th century. The building was listed on the National Register of Historic Places in 1986.

== Description and history ==
The Littleton Main Post Office is located in downtown Littleton, on the north side of Main Street just northwest of Thayer's Hotel, another local architectural landmark. It is an imposing three-story masonry structure, built out of variegated brick laid in English bond, and trimmed with white marble. Its Colonial Revival facade has a central projecting section that frames a recessed entranceway on the ground floor, and a full Doric temple front on the upper two floors. The interior lobby space is equally elaborate, with multicolored tile flooring bordered by gray marble, black marble wainscoting, and a fine mahogany stairway rail with wrought iron balusters.

The building was constructed in 1933 as part of a major Depression-era jobs program, and was designed by the Office of the Supervising Architect for the U.S. Treasury. It served historically as a post office, and as a courthouse of the United States District Court for the District of New Hampshire. Its use as a federal courthouse was discontinued in 1982; it still houses the main post office.

The building currently houses the Grafton County 2nd Circuit Court – Littleton District Division, which hears cases on matters pertinent to Littleton, Monroe, Lyman, Lisbon, Franconia, Bethlehem, Sugar Hill, and Easton.

== See also ==
- National Register of Historic Places listings in Grafton County, New Hampshire
- List of United States federal courthouses in New Hampshire
