= Wesley Lyng Minor =

American architect (1851–1935)

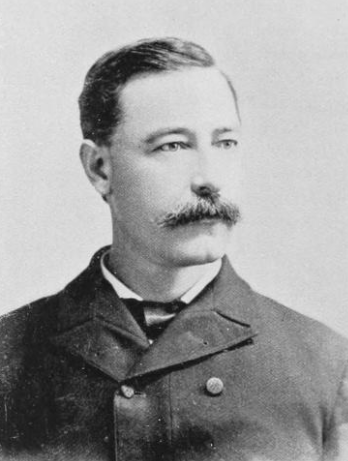
- Wesley L. Minor, circa 1896
- Born: January 8, 1851; Franklin, Louisiana
- Died: 1935 (aged 83 or 84)
- Occupation: Architect

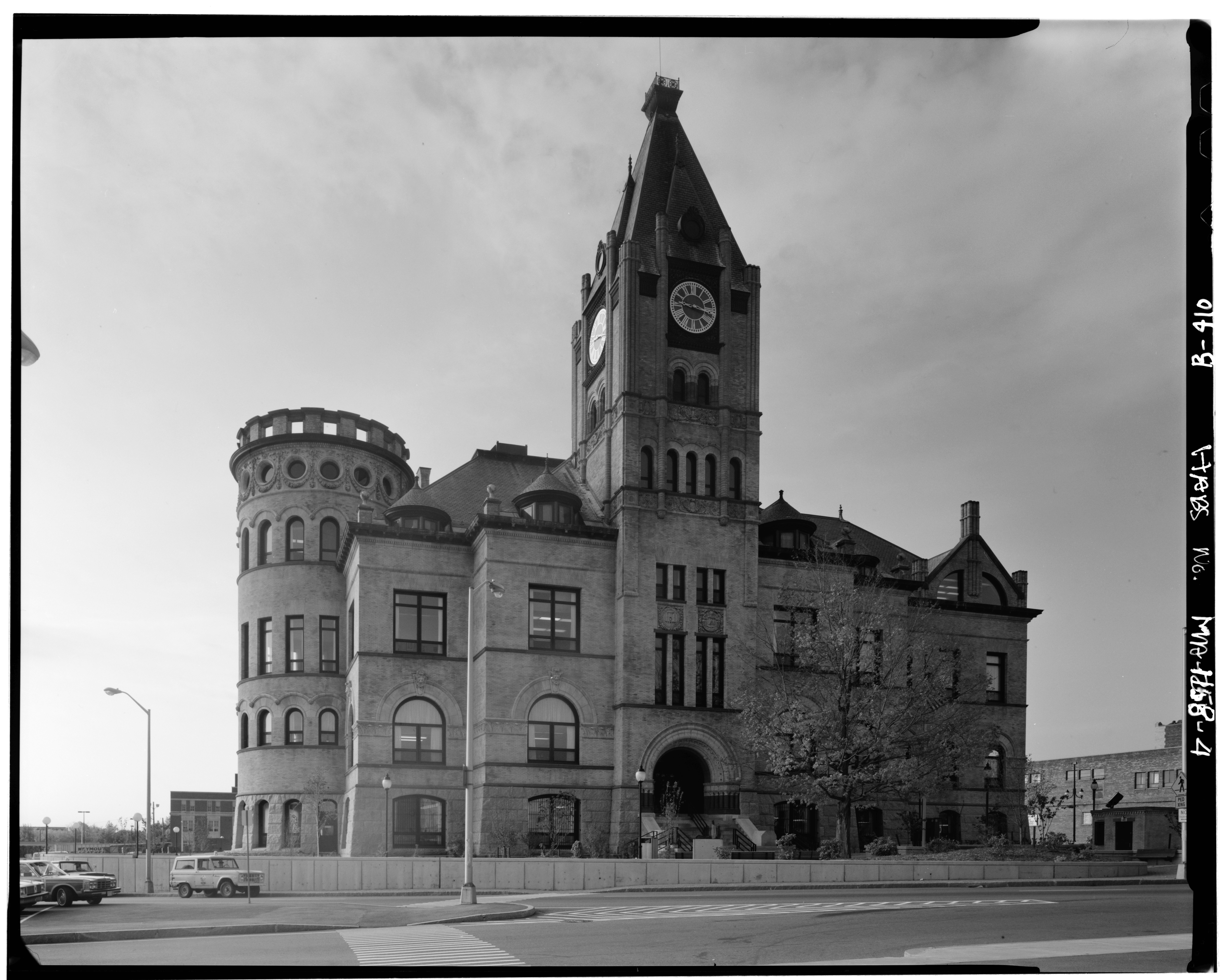
Brockton City Hall, designed by Minor and completed in 1894.

Wesley Lyng Minor (1851–1935) was an American architect in Massachusetts.

== Life and career ==
Minor was born in Franklin, Louisiana on January 8, 1851, but moved to New Bedford, Massachusetts with his family at the age of seven. They later moved to Marion and Middleborough. He began studying architecture with a retired carpenter who taught at the Pierce Academy. Three years later, he moved to Boston, where he worked for William R. Ware. After a few months he moved to Philadelphia, where he worked for John McArthur Jr. A year later he went to New York City and worked for Richard Morris Hunt. In Brockton, he was a contemporary of Waldo V. Howard.

In 1878, Minor established himself as an architect in Charleston, South Carolina. He also worked at Topeka, Denver, and Catlettsburg, never remaining long in any one place.

Around 1880, he moved back to New Bedford. In 1882, he formed a partnership with an unidentified New York architect, and agreed to open a Newport office. Stopping in Brockton, he believed that that city offered more opportunities. His New York partner disagreed, and Minor stayed in Brockton alone. By 1889 the Brockton office was secondary, as Minor had moved his main one to Boston, though he continued to live in Brockton. He later moved to Baltimore, where he had family.

Back in Boston, by 1914 he had formed a partnership with Max M. Kalman (Minor & Kalman) which lasted at least until 1916. He appears to have remained in Boston for the rest of his career. He died in 1935.

== Architectural works ==
- Bixby Block, 106 Main St., Brockton, MA (1883) - Altered.
- Edgar Everett Dean House, 81 Green St., Brockton, MA (1884, NRHP 1978)
- Gardner J. Kingman House, 309 Main St., Brockton, MA (1886, NRHP 1977)
- Middleborough High School, S. Main St., Middleborough, MA (1886) - Demolished.
- Brockton Enterprise Building, 60 Main St., Brockton, MA (1887)
- Centre School, 318 Broadway, Everett, MA (1888–89) - Demolished.
- William L. Douglas House, 306 W. Elm St., Brockton, MA (1891) - Altered.
- Brockton City Hall, 45 School St., Brockton, MA (1892–94, NRHP 1976)
- Brockton Times Building, 9 Main St., Brockton, MA (1897)

Minor & Kalman:

- Hanover Building, 224 Hanover St., Boston, MA (1915)
- Shute's Garage, 12 Garden St., Boston, MA (1916)

Private practice:

- Corowsky Apartments, 67-69 Washington St., Dorchester, MA (1925)
