= Edward H. Lane House =

Historic house in New Hampshire, United States

- U.S. National Register of Historic Places
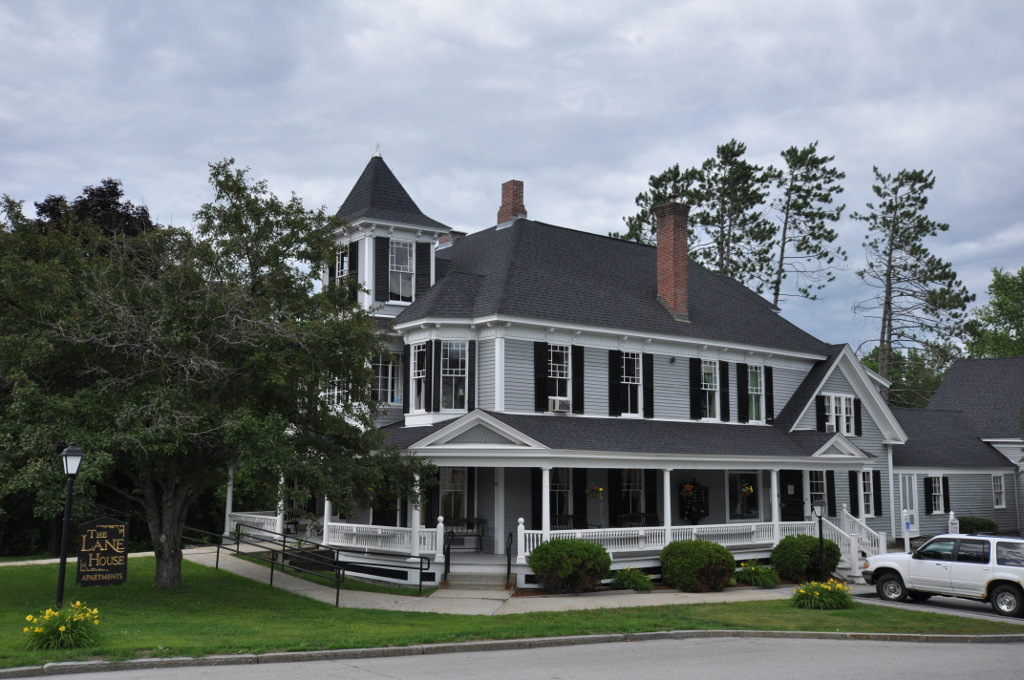

- Location within New Hampshire Location within the United States
- Location: 16 Cottage St., Littleton, New Hampshire
- Coordinates: 44°18′18″N 71°46′3″W
- Area: 4.5 acres (1.8 ha)
- Architectural style: Greek Revival, Queen Anne, Cape Cod
- NRHP reference No.: 80000286
- Added to NRHP: December 8, 1980

The Edward H. Lane House is an historic house located at 16 Cottage Street in Littleton, New Hampshire, United States. With a construction history dating to about 1830, it is a good architectural catalog of changing trends in local styles and economic circumstances. Its front portion, dating to the late 19th century, is a good example of Queen Anne Victorian architecture. The house was listed on the National Register of Historic Places in 1980.

== Description and history ==
The Edward H. Lane House is located just outside Littleton's commercial downtown area, on the east side of Cottage Street (U.S. Route 302) just south of the Ammonoosuc River. It is a somewhat typical connected New England farmstead, with a main house joined to a barn by a number of additions. The oldest portion of the farmstead is a 1 1/2 story wood frame Cape-style structure built c. 1830–50 in the Greek Revival period. It is now an ell to the larger Queen Anne main house, a more elaborately decorated 2 1/2 story wood-frame structure with turret and decorated gables. The older portion is joined to a late 19th century barn by a third addition.

The building reflects Littleton's growing prosperity during the 19th century. The oldest portion is a relatively modest structure suitable for what was at the time a primarily agrarian community. When Littleton's industries boomed in the late 19th century, the prosperity made possible the construction of the much larger and more elaborate front section, with its finely detailed cornices and porches. The building now houses apartments.

== See also ==
- National Register of Historic Places listings in Grafton County, New Hampshire
