= Moses Packard House =

Historic building in Boston, Massachusetts

- U.S. National Register of Historic Places
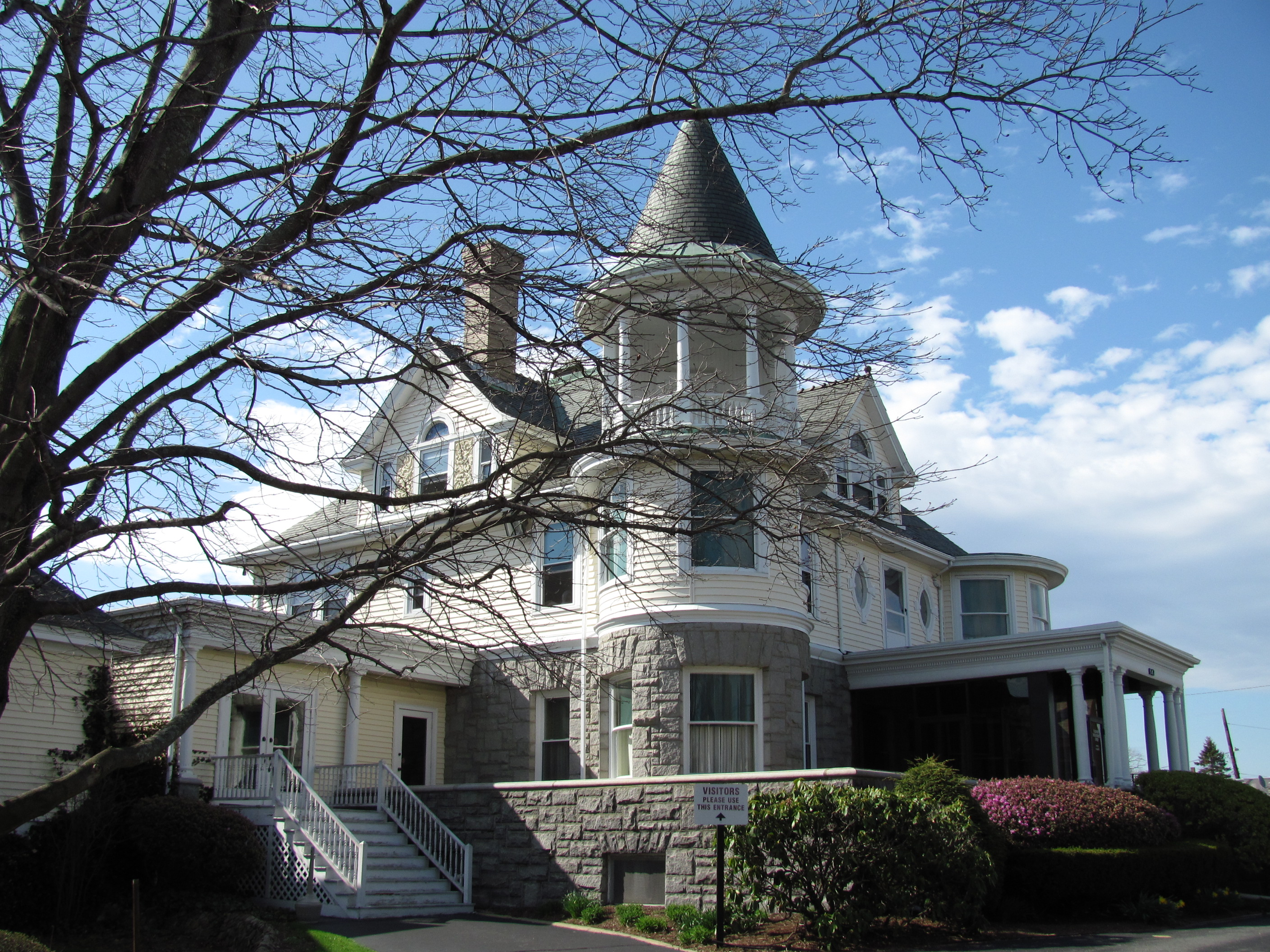
- Moses Packard House

- Location within Massachusetts Location within the United States
- Location: Brockton, Massachusetts
- Coordinates: 42°4′20″N 71°1′11″W
- Built: 1897
- Architect: Howard & Austin
- Architectural style: Queen Anne
- NRHP reference No.: 78000475
- Added to NRHP: February 17, 1978

The Moses Packard House is a historic house located at 647 Main Street in Brockton, Massachusetts.

== Description and history ==
It is a 2 1/2-story wood-frame structure, with a first floor finished in rusticated stone. The house has a variety of gables, projections, and porches, typical of the Queen Anne style, including a three-story turret capped by a conical roof. It was built in 1897 by Moses Packard, a prominent local shoemaker, and is one of the city's finest examples of Queen Anne architecture.

The house was listed on the National Register of Historic Places in 1978. The house now serves as the Dahlborg-MacNevin Funeral Home.

== See also ==
- National Register of Historic Places listings in Plymouth County, Massachusetts
