= Lisbon (CDP), New Hampshire =

Census-designated place in New Hampshire, United States

Lisbon, New Hampshire
- Census-designated place
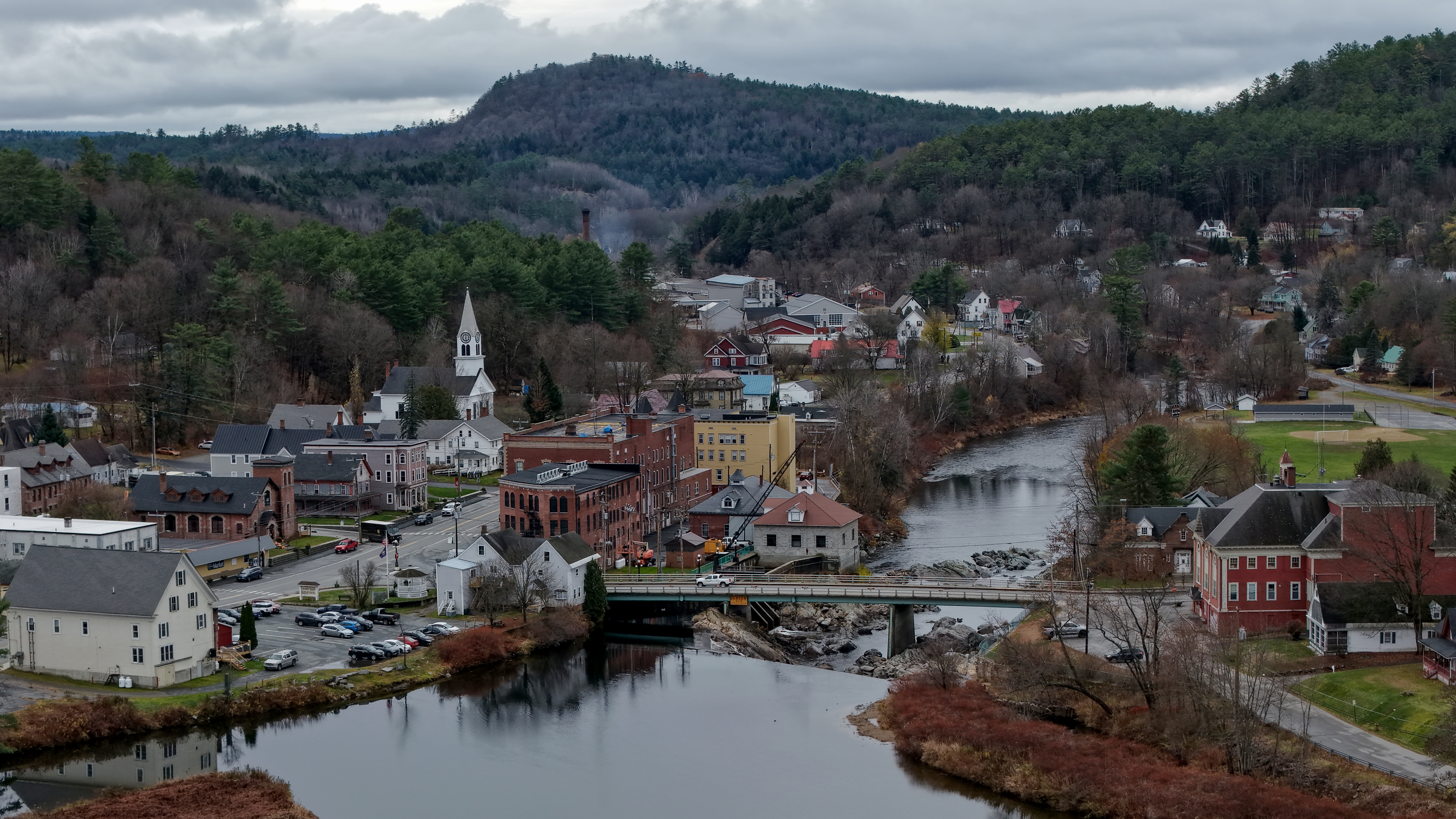
- Lisbon, New Hampshire, from the north

- Location within New Hampshire Location within the United States
- Coordinates: 44°12′45″N 71°54′32″W
- Country: United States
- State: New Hampshire
- County: Grafton
- Town: Lisbon

Area
  - Total: 3.41 sq mi (8.83 km^{2})
  - Land: 3.33 sq mi (8.63 km^{2})
  - Water: 0.077 sq mi (0.20 km^{2})
- Elevation: 633 ft (193 m)

Population (2020)
  - Total: 965
  - Density: 289.7/sq mi (111.85/km^{2})
- Time zone: UTC-5 (Eastern (EST))
  - Summer (DST): UTC-4 (EDT)
- ZIP code: 03585
- Area code: 603
- FIPS code: 33-41940
- GNIS feature ID: 2378077

Lisbon is a census-designated place (CDP) and the main village in the town of Lisbon, New Hampshire, United States. The population of the CDP was 965 at the 2020 census, out of 1,621 in the entire town.

== Geography ==
The CDP is in the southwestern corner of the town of Lisbon, on both sides of the Ammonoosuc River, a southwest-flowing tributary of the Connecticut River. The CDP is bordered to the south by the town of Landaff, to the southwest by the town of Bath, and to the northwest by the town of Lyman. The CDP extends east as far as Pearl Lake, and the eastern boundary of the CDP follows Pearl Lake Brook downstream to the Ammonoosuc. The CDP boundary follows the Ammonoosuc River upstream as far as the Ammonoosuc Country Club, then proceeds southwest to Parker Hill Road, excluding Crestview Drive. The boundary follows Brooks Road west to the Lyman town line.

U.S. Route 302 is the main road through Lisbon, leading northeastward up the Ammonoosuc River valley 10 miles (16 km) to Littleton and southwest (downriver) the same distance to Woodsville at the Connecticut River.

According to the U.S. Census Bureau, the Lisbon CDP has a total area of 3.4 square miles (8.8 km^{2}), of which 3.3 square miles (8.6 km^{2}) are land and 0.1 square miles (0.2 km^{2}), or 2.31%, are water.

== Demographics ==
Historical population
Census	Pop.	Note	%±
1950	1,372		—
1960	1,220		−11.1%
1970	1,247		2.2%
1980	1,151		−7.7%
1990	1,246		8.3%
2000	1,070		−14.1%
2010	980		−8.4%
2020	965		−1.5%
U.S. Decennial Census

As of the census of 2010, there were 980 people, 399 households, and 269 families residing in the CDP. There were 472 housing units, of which 73, or 15.5%, were vacant. The racial makeup of the CDP was 97.8% white, 0.3% African American, 0.1% Native American, 0.0% Asian, 0.0% Pacific Islander, 0.4% some other race, and 1.4% from two or more races. 1.2% of the population were Hispanic or Latino of any race.

Of the 399 households in the CDP, 32.3% had children under the age of 18 living with them, 46.9% were headed by married couples living together, 13.0% had a female householder with no husband present, and 32.6% were non-families. 26.1% of all households were made up of individuals, and 10.1% were someone living alone who was 65 years of age or older. The average household size was 2.46, and the average family size was 2.93.

25.1% of residents in the CDP were under the age of 18, 7.9% were from age 18 to 24, 24.2% were from 25 to 44, 29.2% were from 45 to 64, and 13.5% were 65 years of age or older. The median age was 39.9 years. For every 100 females, there were 97.2 males. For every 100 females age 18 and over, there were 94.7 males.

For the period 2011–15, the estimated median annual income for a household was $47,697, and the median income for a family was $52,574. Male full-time workers had a median income of $35,764 versus $31,146 for females. The per capita income for the CDP was $20,814. 17.4% of the population and 10.5% of families were below the poverty line, along with 34.1% of people under the age of 18 and 12.7% of people 65 or older.
