= Littleton Town Building =

- Littleton Opera House
- U.S. National Register of Historic Places
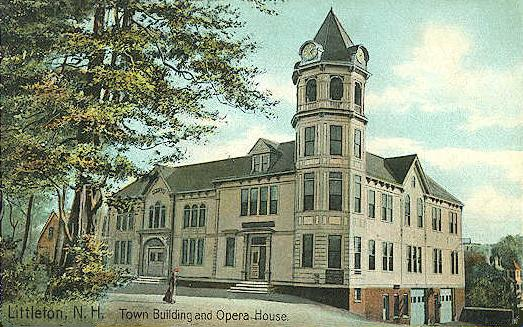
- 1908 postcard view

- Location within New Hampshire Location within the United States
- Location: 1 Union St., Littleton, New Hampshire
- Coordinates: 44°18′21″N 71°46′12″W
- Area: 0.3 acres (0.12 ha)
- Built: 1894
- Architect: Howard & Austin
- Architectural style: Late Victorian
- NRHP reference No.: 73000164
- Added to NRHP: May 07, 1973

The Littleton Town Building, also known as the Littleton Opera House, is a historic municipal building at 1 Union Street in Littleton, New Hampshire. Built on a steep embankment overlooking the Ammonoosuc River in 1894–5, it is a good example of a Late Victorian municipal building, which continues to serve that purpose today. The building was listed on the National Register of Historic Places in 1973.

== Description and history ==
The Littleton Town Building occupies a prominent position at the eastern end of its Main Street, standing at the southeast corner of Union and Cottage Streets on a lot fronting the Ammonoosuc River to the south. It is a wood-frame structure presenting five stories to its rear (facing the river) and three on the front, owing to the steeply sloping lot. Its most prominent feature is the six-sided tower rising above its northwest corner. It is covered by a truncated hip roof, with a wooden parapet encircling the central flat roof. The main roof eave is lined with brackets, with gabled wall dormers on the two street-facing facades. There are two primary entrances on the Union Street facade, each sheltered by Stick style gabled hoods supported by large triangular brackets. Windows on the upper level of the theater section have rounded tops.

The building was designed by Howard & Austin of Brockton, Massachusetts, and was completed in 1895. When built the structure housed all manner of municipal services, including fire, police, library, and town offices. The east end of the building is taken up by the opera house, a multi-galleried auditorium with a seating capacity of 750. It was originally used by a local concert organizer, and continues to serve as a major local venue for theatrical and musical events.

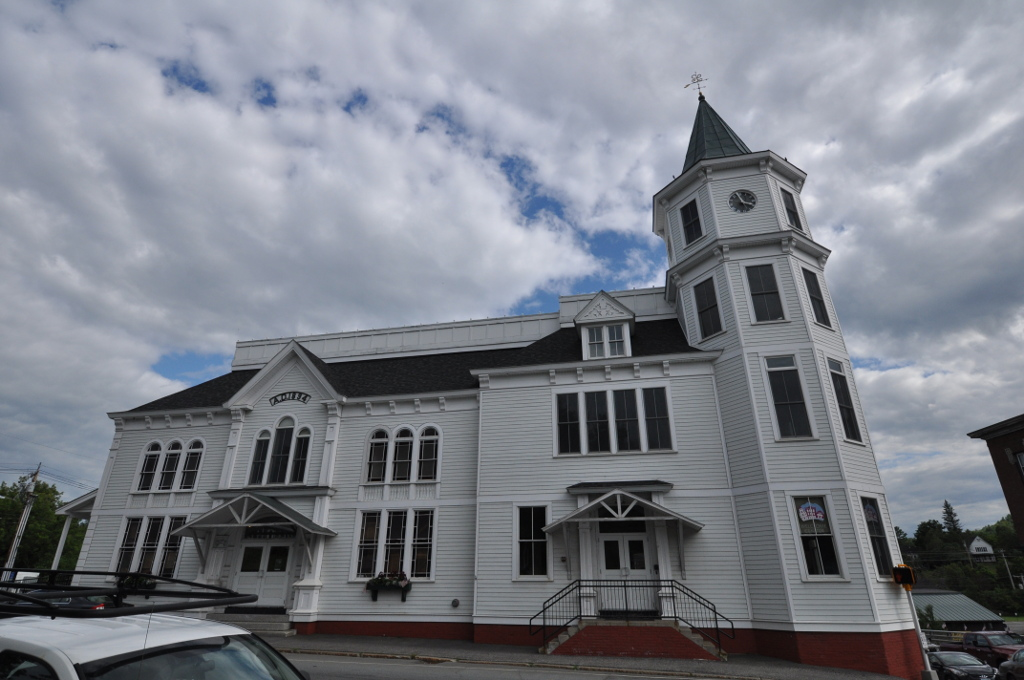
View in 2015

== See also ==
- National Register of Historic Places listings in Grafton County, New Hampshire
