= Central Fire Station (Brockton, Massachusetts) =

- U.S. National Register of Historic Places
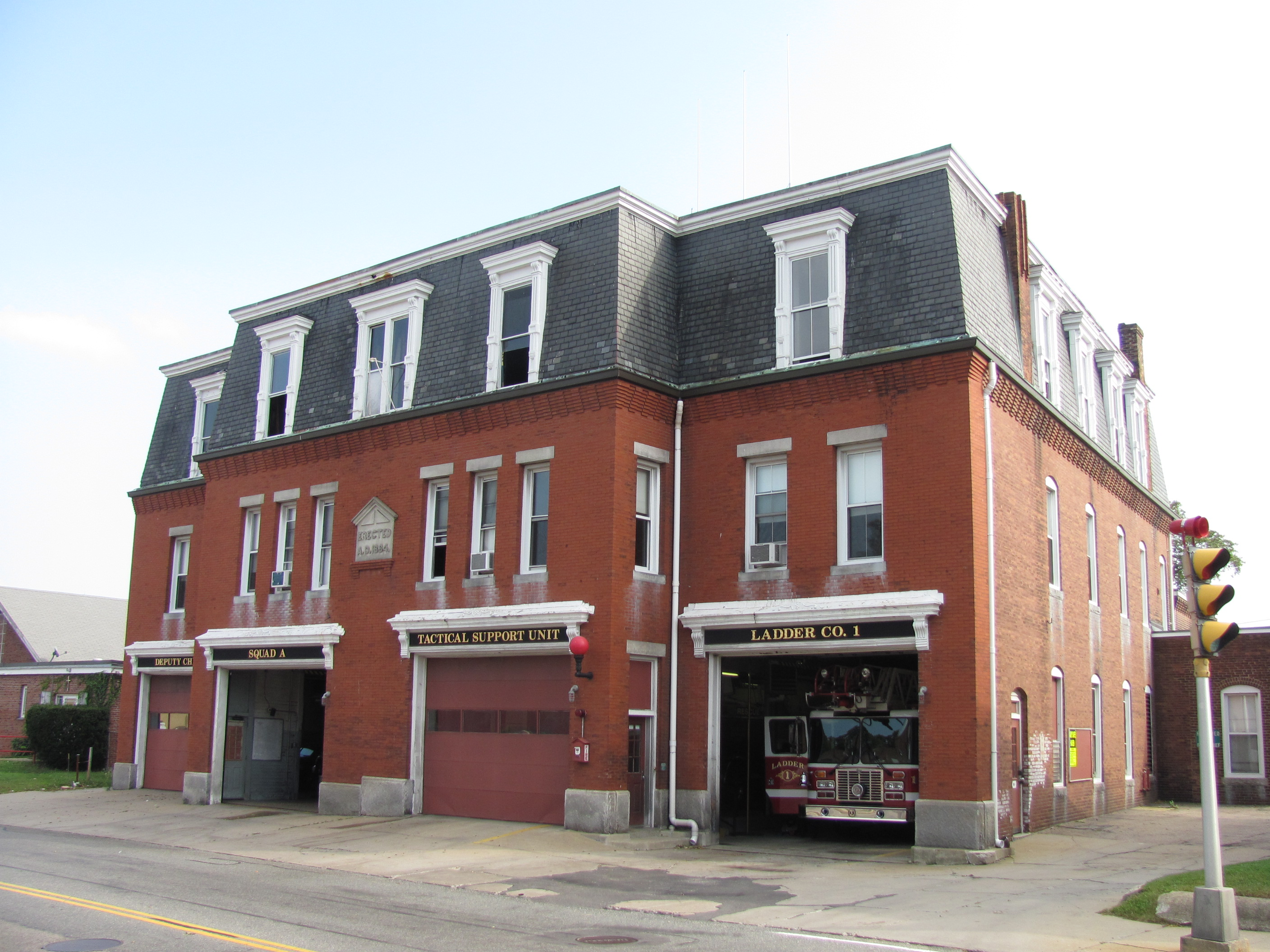
- Central Fire Station

- Location within Massachusetts Location within the United States
- Location: Brockton, Massachusetts
- Coordinates: 42°5′6″N 71°1′17″W
- Built: 1885
- Architect: Waldo V. Howard
- Architectural style: Second Empire
- NRHP reference No.: 77000193
- Added to NRHP: July 25, 1977

The Central Fire Station is a historic fire station on 40 Pleasant Street in Brockton, Massachusetts. Built in 1884–85, the three-story brick mansard-roofed Second Empire building included several "firsts". It was the first brick firehouse in the city, and it was the nation's first firehouse to be electrified, receiving its power via an underground cable from a nearby power plant that had been built under the supervision of Thomas Alva Edison.

The building was listed on the National Register of Historic Places in 1977.

Station 1 houses 4 fire apparatus, the Deputy Chief's command car, The Rescue, Squad A, and Ladder 1.

== See also ==
- National Register of Historic Places listings in Plymouth County, Massachusetts
