= Gardner J. Kingman House =

Historic house in Massachusetts, United States

- U.S. National Register of Historic Places
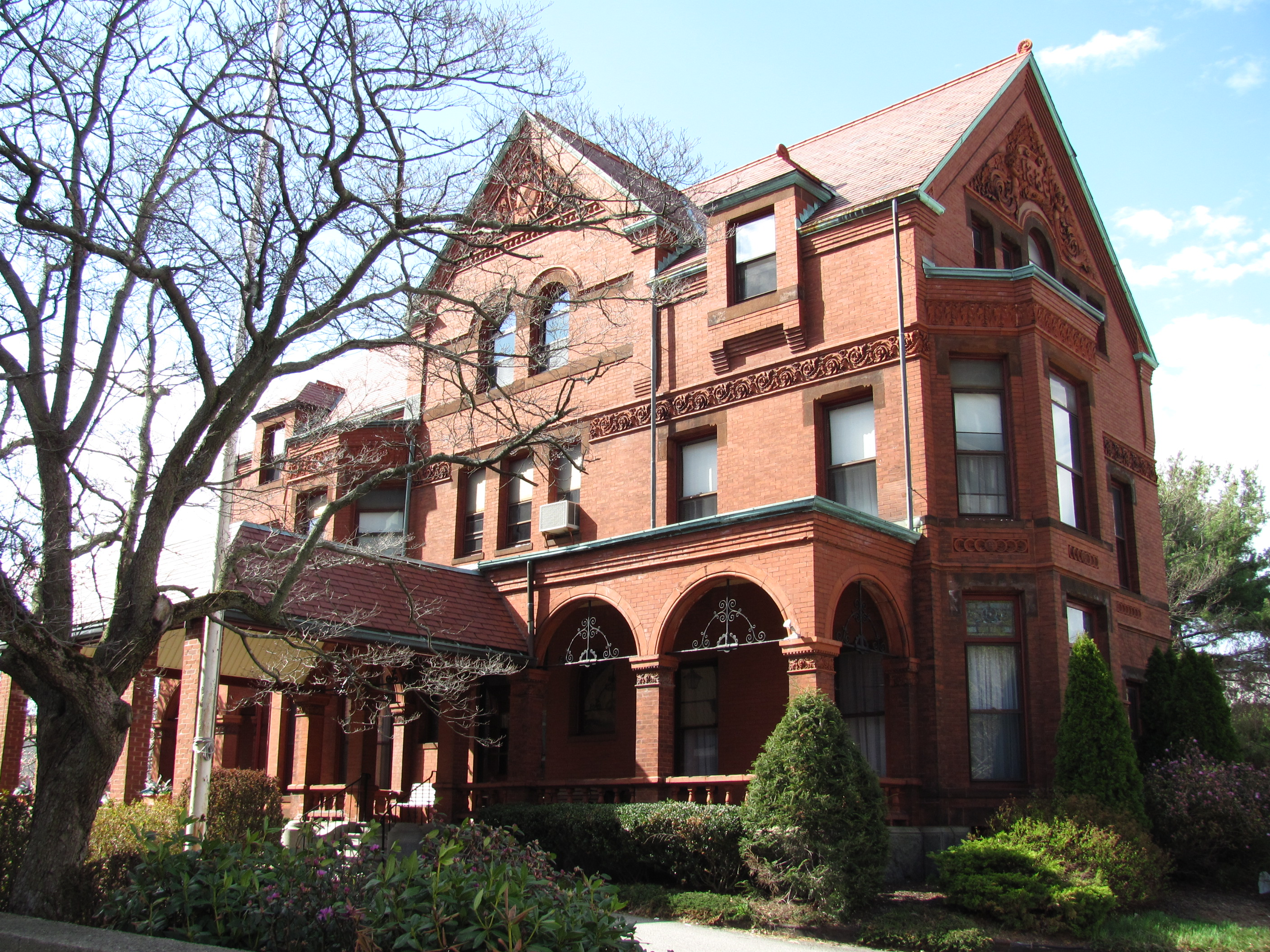

- Location within Massachusetts Location within the United States
- Location: Brockton, Massachusetts
- Coordinates: 42°4′45″N 71°1′15″W
- Built: 1886
- Architect: Wesley Lyng Minor
- Architectural style: Queen Anne
- NRHP reference No.: 77000196
- Added to NRHP: July 25, 1977

The Gardner J. Kingman House is a historic house located at 309 Main Street in Brockton, Massachusetts.

== Description and history ==
Built in 1886 to a design by the locally prominent architect Wesley Lyng Minor, this three story house was the first brick residence built in the city, and is one of its finest. It has Queen Anne styling, with a variety of projections, decorations, and gables, including its main front gable, which has a large terra cotta floral-patterned panel. The building was commissioned by Gardner Kingman, a businessman prominent in civic affairs and in the city's dominant shoe industry; it has served as a funeral home for many years.

The house was listed on the National Register of Historic Places on July 25, 1977.

== See also ==
- National Register of Historic Places listings in Plymouth County, Massachusetts
