= Thayer's Hotel =

- U.S. National Register of Historic Places
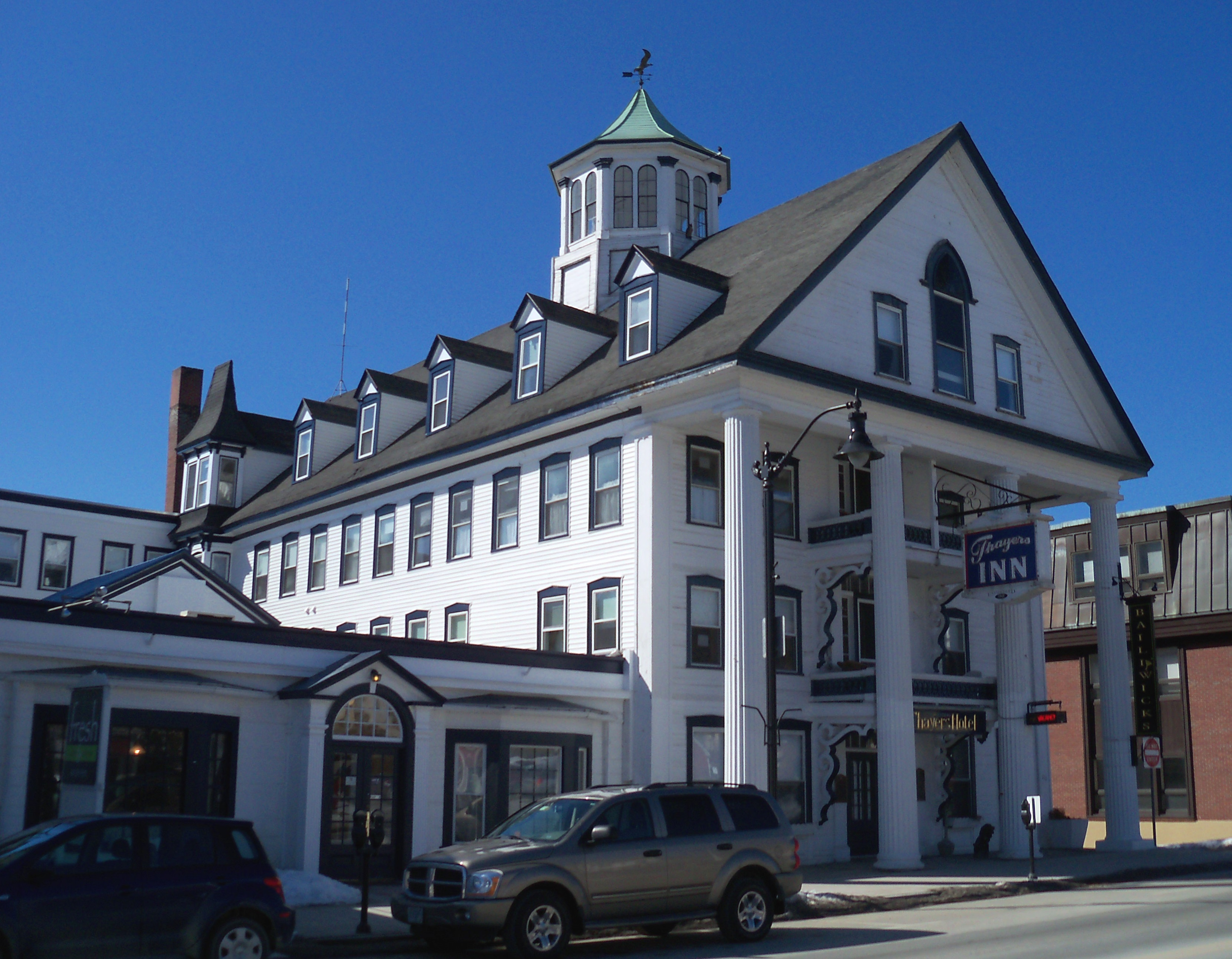

- Location within New Hampshire Location within the United States
- Location: 136 Main St., Littleton, New Hampshire
- Coordinates: 44°18′23″N 71°46′28″W
- Area: less than one acre
- Built: 1843
- Architectural style: Greek Revival
- NRHP reference No.: 82001678
- Added to NRHP: March 9, 1982

Thayer's Hotel is a historic hotel building at 136 Main Street in downtown Littleton, New Hampshire, United States. Built in 1843, it is a prominent precursor to the region's later grand resort hotels, and a distinctive example of Greek Revival architecture with a monumental temple front. The building was listed on the National Register of Historic Places in 1982. It is now operated as Thayer's Inn.

== Description and history ==
Thayer's Hotel is located in Littleton's downtown central business district, on the south side of Main Street near the post office. It is a 3 1/2-story wood-frame structure, with a gabled roof and clapboarded exterior. The roof's front gable is fully pedimented, and projects beyond the building face, supported by massive three-story fluted Doric columns. Behind this portico, the facade is five bays wide, with doorways at the center of each level, those on the upper floors opening onto balconies supported by elaborate carved brackets. The building is crowned by an octagonal cupola. The interior has retained its basic floorplan and many original finishes. Its attic level, originally a ballroom, was converted into bedrooms in the early 20th century.

The hotel was built in 1843, and was a precursor of the grand resort hotels that were later built in northern New Hampshire. It was built in anticipation of the arrival of the railroad, and was a social center of the town from its opening. It has served as a backdrop for political rallies dating from the Civil War to the late 20th century, and parts of its architecture were sought by Henry Ford for his museum of Americana in the 1930s.

== See also ==
- National Register of Historic Places listings in Grafton County, New Hampshire
