= Brockton City Hall =

- U.S. National Register of Historic Places
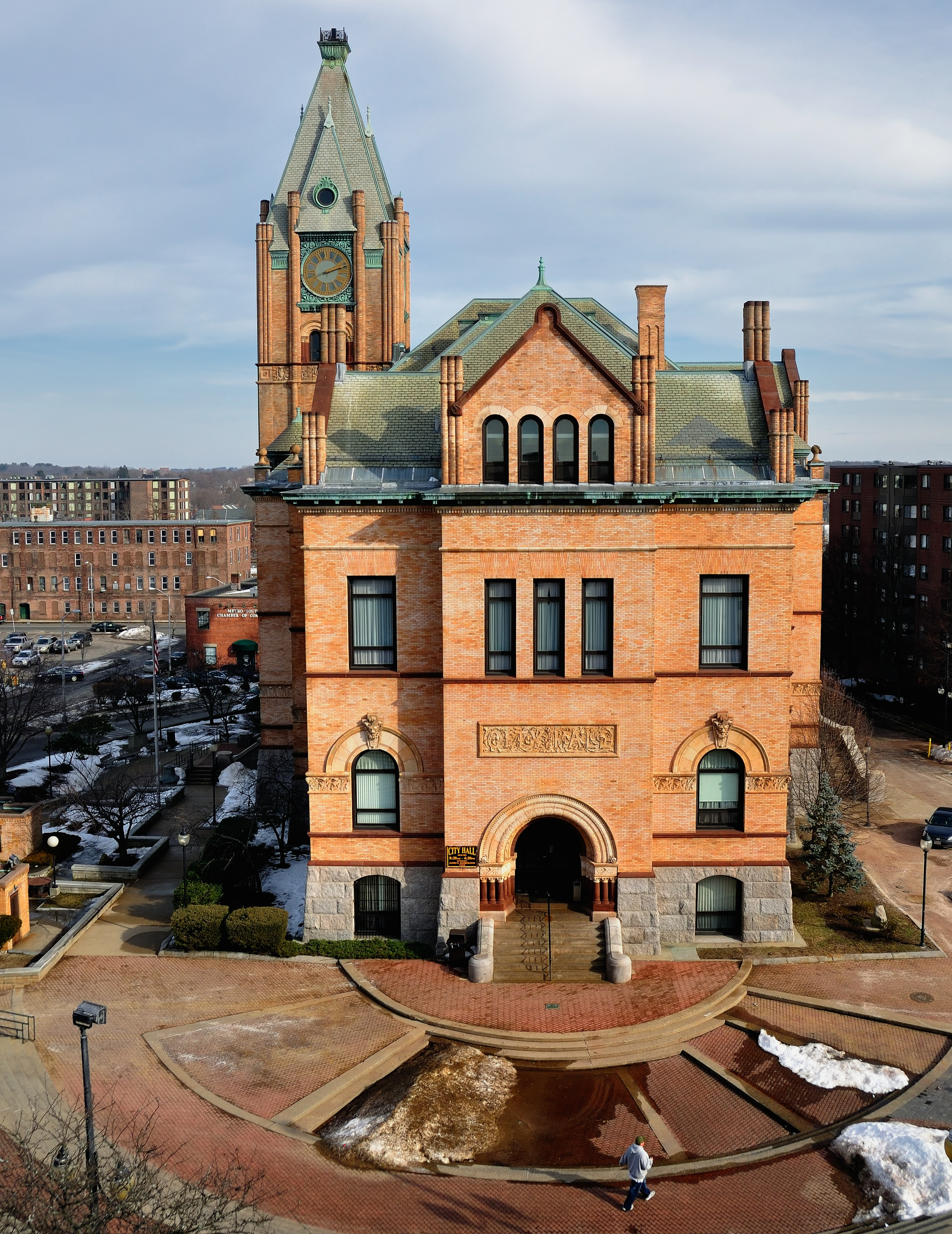
- City Hall

- Location within Massachusetts Location within the United States
- Location: Brockton, Massachusetts
- Coordinates: 42°4′56″N 71°1′7″W
- Area: 1.42 acres (0.57 ha)
- Built: 1892
- Architect: Wesley Lyng Minor
- NRHP reference No.: 76000296
- Added to NRHP: March 26, 1976

The city hall of Brockton, Massachusetts is located at 45 School Street. It is a predominantly brick 2 1/2-story building sited on an entire city block bounded by School Street, East Elm Street, and City Hall Square. The Romanesque Revival structure was designed by local architect Wesley Lyng Minor, and built in 1892–94. It has entrances on three sides, each under a round Richardsonian arch with carved voussoirs. Its most prominent feature is a five-story tower, decorated with terra cotta panels and topped by a steeply pitched Gothic style hip roof. The east elevation also has a three-story circular tower topped by a battlement. It was the first purpose-built building for housing the city's offices. The grand hall of the interior features murals depicting scenes of the American Civil War, painted by Richard Holland and Mortimer Lamb in 1893.

The building was listed on the National Register of Historic Places in 1976.

== See also ==
- National Register of Historic Places listings in Plymouth County, Massachusetts
