= Lisbon, New Hampshire =

- Town
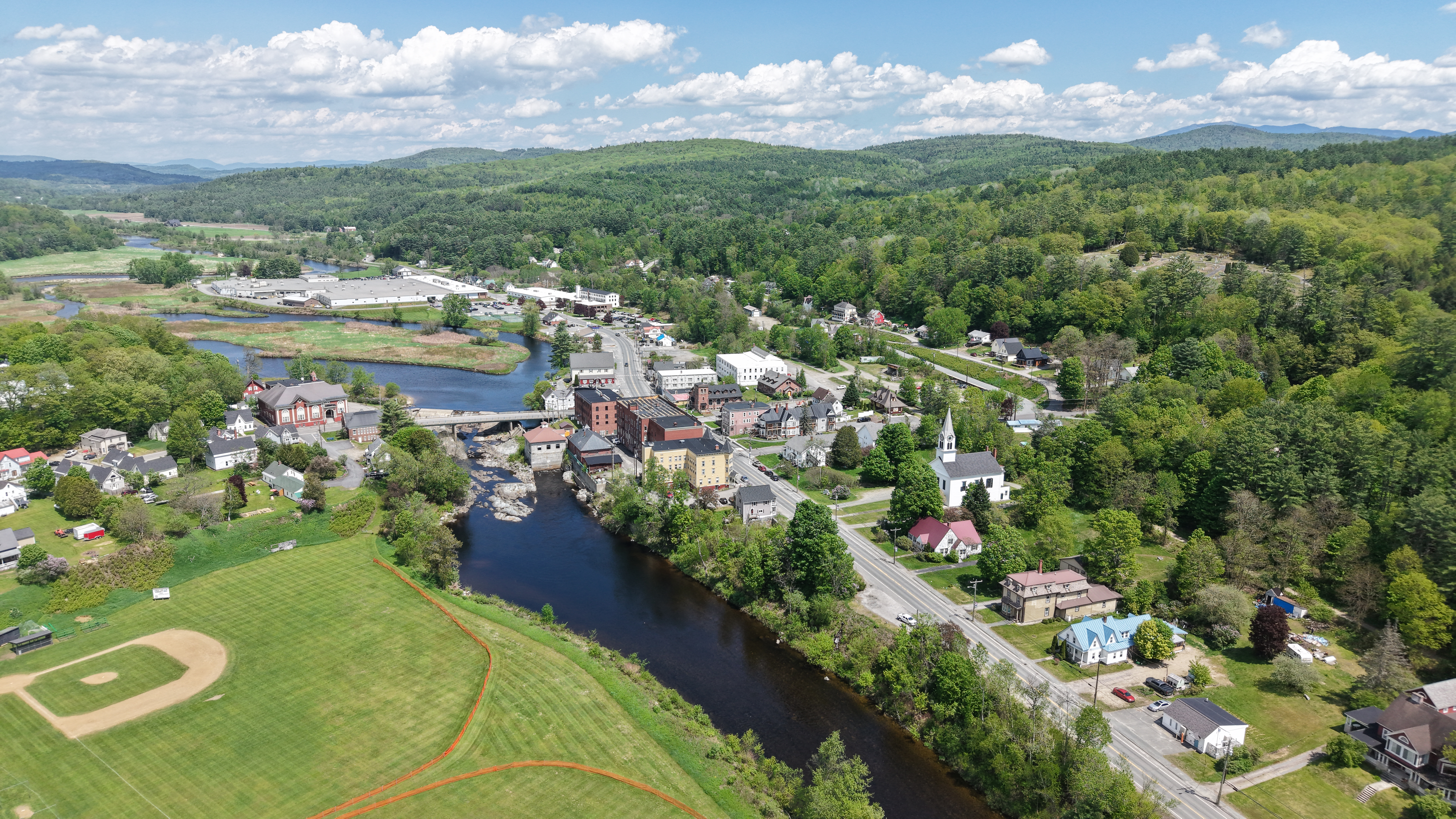
- Lisbon, NH, from the southwest

- Seal

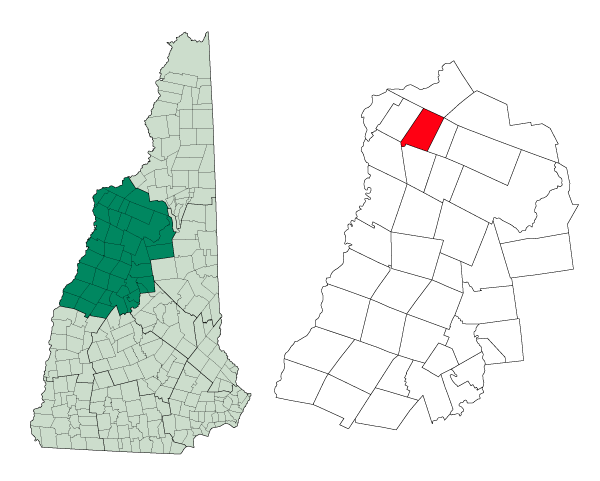
- Location in Grafton County, New Hampshire
- Coordinates: 44°14′23″N 71°51′46″W
- Country: United States
- State: New Hampshire
- County: Grafton
- Incorporated: 1763
- Villages: Lisbon; Barrett; Savageville

Area
  - Total: 26.7 sq mi (69.1 km^{2})
  - Land: 26.3 sq mi (68.0 km^{2})
  - Water: 0.42 sq mi (1.1 km^{2}) 1.60%
- Elevation: 794 ft (242 m)

Population (2020)
  - Total: 1,621
  - Density: 62/sq mi (23.9/km^{2})
- Time zone: UTC-5 (Eastern)
  - Summer (DST): UTC-4 (Eastern)
- ZIP code: 03585
- Area code: 603
- FIPS code: 33-42020
- GNIS feature ID: 873647
- Website: www.lisbonnh.org

Lisbon is a town in Grafton County, New Hampshire, United States. The population was 1,621 at the 2020 census. Lisbon hosts an annual lilac festival on Memorial Day weekend.

The main village, where 965 people resided at the 2020 census, is defined as the Lisbon census-designated place (CDP) and is located along U.S. Route 302 and the Ammonoosuc River in the southwestern corner of the town.

== History ==
Lisbon was first granted in 1763 by colonial Governor Benning Wentworth as "Concord". In 1764 the town was renamed "Chiswick", after the Duke of Devonshire's castle, while Rumford in central New Hampshire took the name "Concord" in 1765. In 1768, the town was settled and renamed again, this time to "Gunthwaite", after a relation of colonial Governor John Wentworth. The name "Lisbon" was selected by Governor Levi Woodbury when it was incorporated in 1824. His friend, Colonel William Jarvis, had been consul at Lisbon, Portugal. The town once included land that is now part of Littleton and Sugar Hill.

Charcoal-making was an early industry. Iron, gold and other minerals were mined here. The narrow, steep falls of the Ammonoosuc River provided water power for numerous watermills and factories, and the Parker Young Company was at one time the largest manufacturer of piano sounding boards in the world. Lisbon was the site of the first rope ski tow in New Hampshire.

The Lisbon Area Historical Society promotes the public's interest in and appreciation for the towns of Lisbon, Landaff and Lyman, and maintains the collection, preservation and cataloging of materials which establish or illustrate the history of the three towns, their indigenous history and heritage, their exploration, settlement and development, as well as their cultural and artistic heritage.

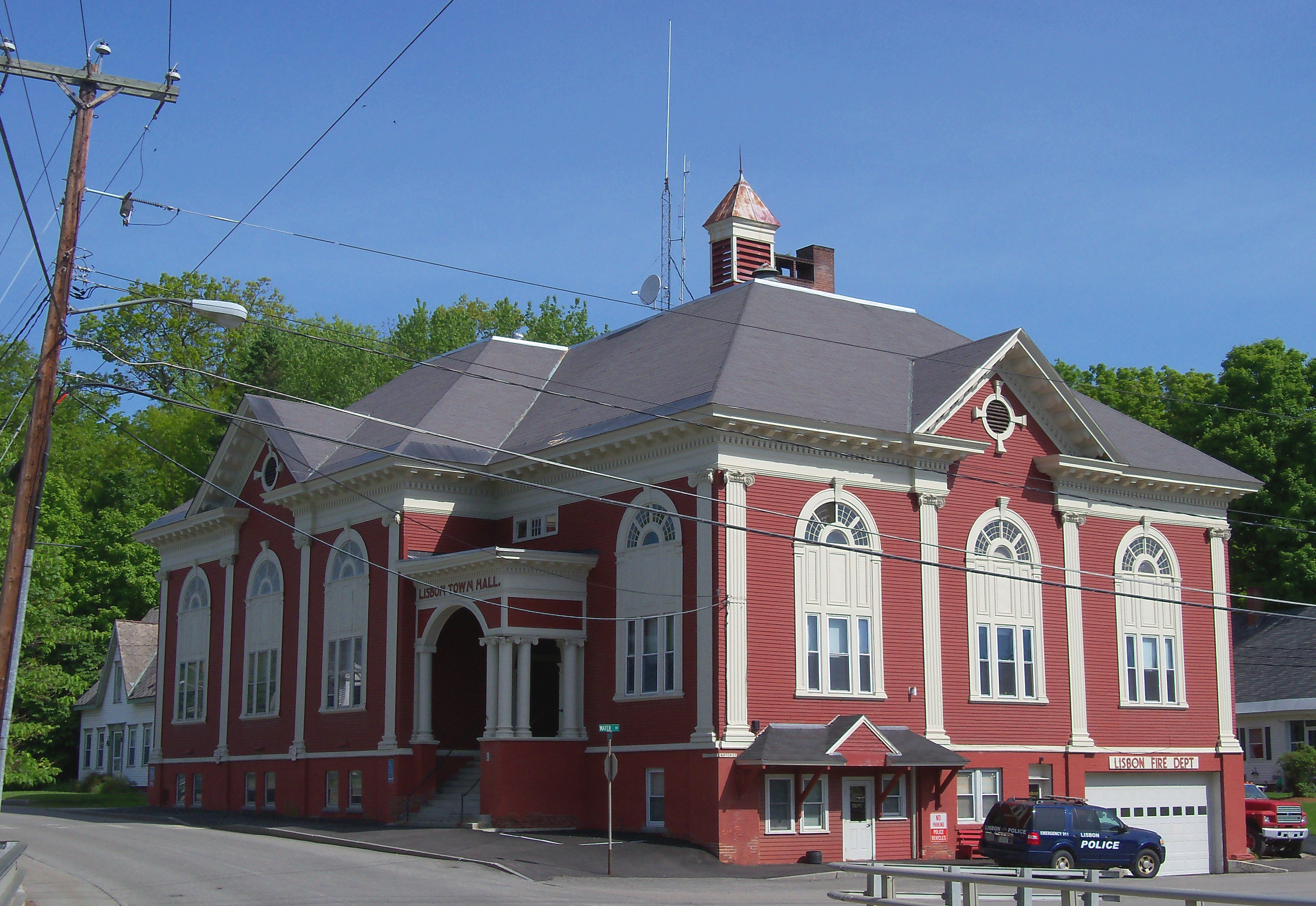
Old Lisbon Town Hall

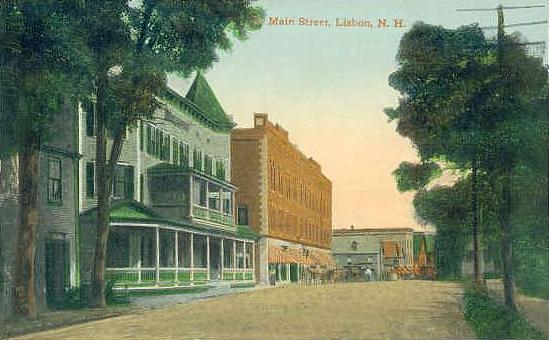
Main Street c. 1910

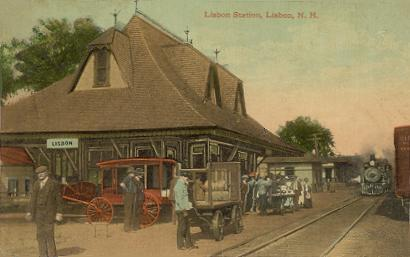
Lisbon Station in 1912

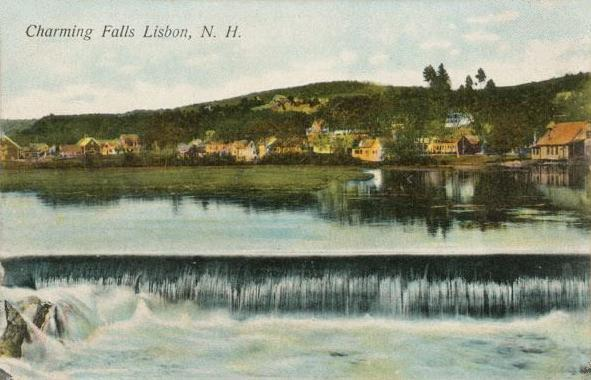
Falls in 1906

== Geography ==
According to the United States Census Bureau, the town has a total area of 26.7 square miles (69.1 km^{2}), of which 26.3 square miles (68.0 km^{2}) are land and 0.42 square miles (1.1 km^{2}) are water, comprising 1.60% of the town. The town is drained by the Ammonoosuc River and its tributary, the Gale River.

The highest point in town is an unnamed hill east of Pearl Lake which reaches 1,620 feet (490 m) above sea level.

== Demographics ==
Historical population
Census	Pop.	Note	%±
1830	1,485		—
1840	1,682		13.3%
1850	1,881		11.8%
1860	1,886		0.3%
1870	1,844		−2.2%
1880	1,807		−2.0%
1890	2,060		14.0%
1900	2,221		7.8%
1910	2,460		10.8%
1920	2,288		−7.0%
1930	2,324		1.6%
1940	2,103		−9.5%
1950	2,009		−4.5%
1960	1,788		−11.0%
1970	1,480		−17.2%
1980	1,517		2.5%
1990	1,664		9.7%
2000	1,587		−4.6%
2010	1,595		0.5%
2020	1,621		1.6%
U.S. Decennial Census

As of the census of 2010, there were 1,595 people, 659 households, and 439 families residing in the town. There were 809 housing units, of which 150, or 18.5%, were vacant. 81 of the vacant units were for seasonal or recreational use. The racial makeup of the town was 97.8% white, 0.2% African American, 0.2% Native American, 0.0% Asian, 0.0% Native Hawaiian or Pacific Islander, 0.4% some other race, and 1.4% from two or more races. 0.9% of the population were Hispanic or Latino of any race.

Of the 659 households, 30.8% had children under the age of 18 living with them, 48.7% were headed by married couples living together, 11.4% had a female householder with no husband present, and 33.4% were non-families. 25.5% of all households were made up of individuals, and 8.5% were someone living alone who was 65 years of age or older. The average household size was 2.42, and the average family size was 2.87.

In the town, 22.9% of the population were under the age of 18, 7.0% were from 18 to 24, 23.4% from 25 to 44, 32.3% from 45 to 64, and 14.3% were 65 years of age or older. The median age was 42.8 years. For every 100 females, there were 100.4 males. For every 100 females age 18 and over, there were 97.0 males.

For the period 2011–2015, the estimated median annual income for a household was $47,946, and the median income for a family was $53,700. Male full-time workers had a median income of $36,490 versus $31,845 for females. The per capita income for the town was $23,897. 16.6% of the population and 8.9% of families were below the poverty line. 27.8% of the population under the age of 18 and 11.0% of those 65 or older were living in poverty.

== Notable people ==
- Franklin Gilman (1825–1880), Wisconsin State Assemblyman and farmer; born in Lisbon
- Herbert Archer "H.A." Richardson (1852–1942), California pioneer, timber baron, shipping magnate
- C. C. Young (1869–1947), governor of California
