= Littleton (CDP), New Hampshire =

Census-designated place in New Hampshire, United States

Littleton, New Hampshire
- Census-designated place
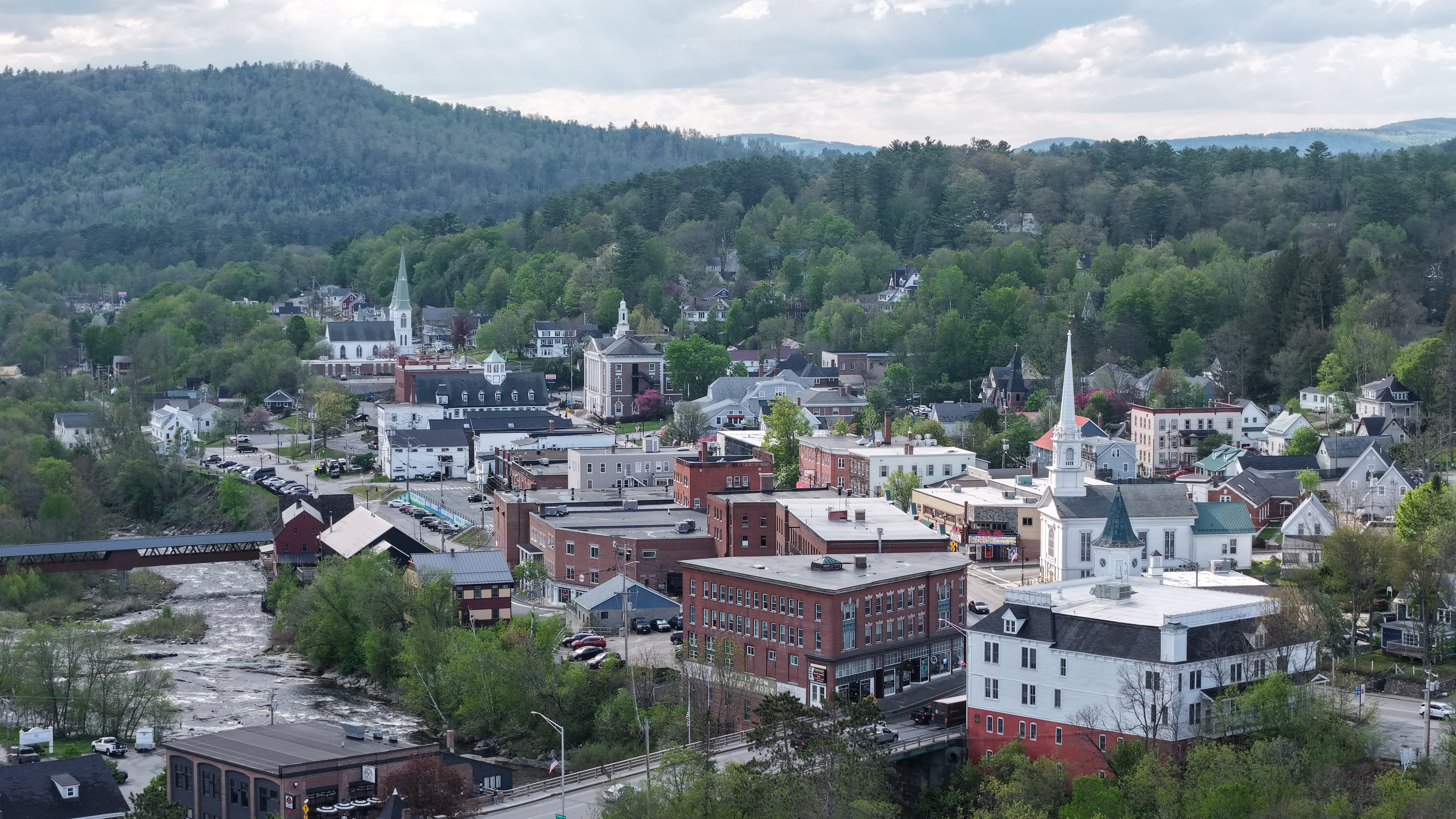
- Littleton, NH, from the southeast

- Location within New Hampshire Location within the United States
- Coordinates: 44°18′22″N 71°46′12″W
- Country: United States
- State: New Hampshire
- County: Grafton
- Town: Littleton

Area
  - Total: 8.54 sq mi (22.13 km^{2})
  - Land: 8.45 sq mi (21.89 km^{2})
  - Water: 0.093 sq mi (0.24 km^{2})
- Elevation: 968 ft (295 m)

Population (2020)
  - Total: 4,467
  - Density: 528.5/sq mi (204.05/km^{2})
- Time zone: UTC-5 (Eastern (EST))
  - Summer (DST): UTC-4 (EDT)
- ZIP code: 03561
- Area code: 603
- FIPS code: 33-42500
- GNIS feature ID: 2378078

Littleton is a census-designated place (CDP) and the main village in the town of Littleton, New Hampshire, United States. The population of the CDP was 4,467 at the 2020 census, out of 6,005 in the entire town.

== Geography ==
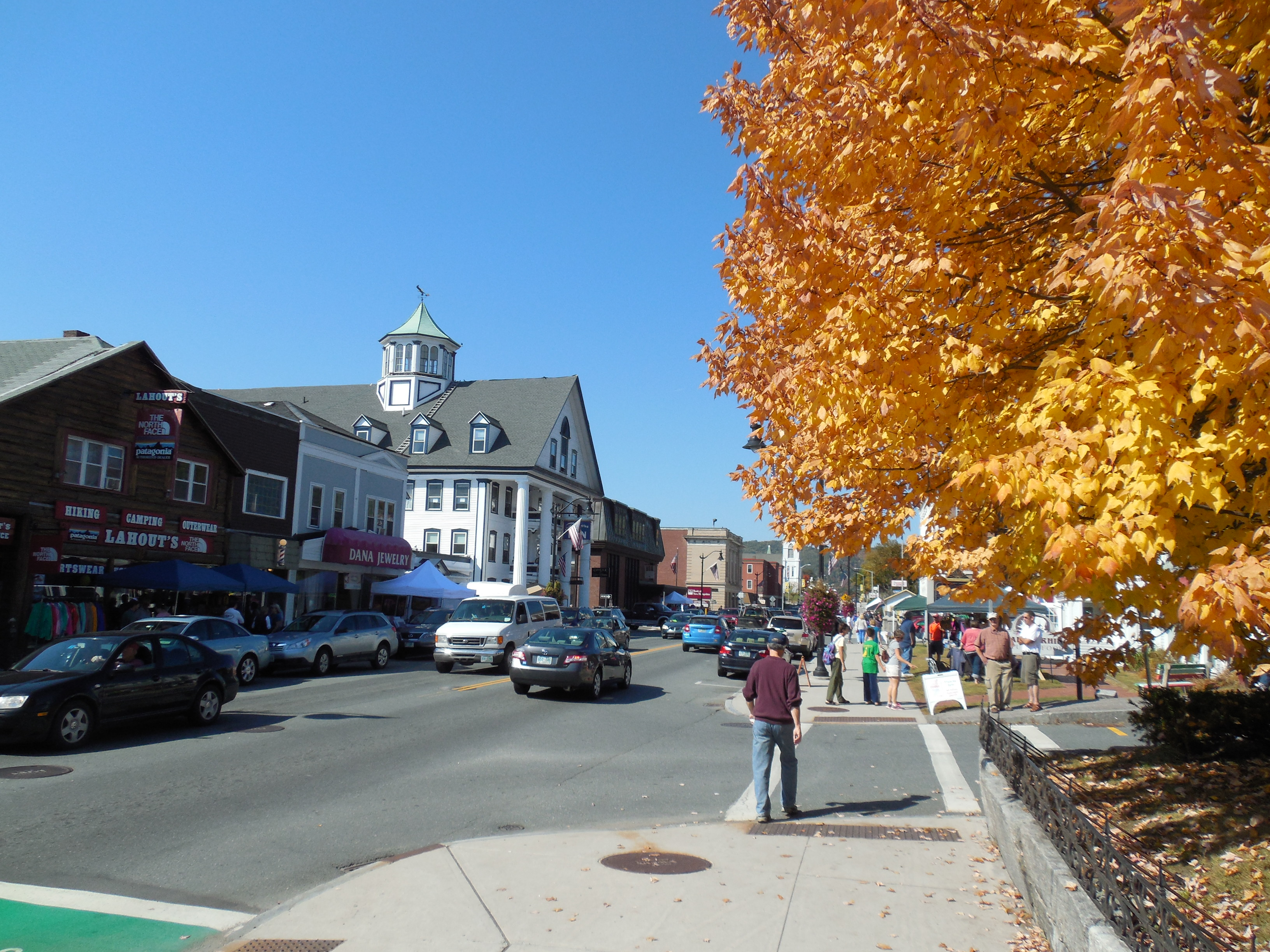
Main Street

The CDP is in the eastern part of the town of Littleton, on both sides of the Ammonoosuc River and extending north to include 1,905-foot (581 m) Parker Mountain. The CDP is bordered to the southeast by the town of Bethlehem and to the southwest by Interstate 93. The northern boundary of the CDP, starting at Interstate 93, follows West Main Street, Brickyard Road, Fox Ridge Road, Farr Hill Road, Broomstick Hill Road, Manns Hill Road and Fowler Brook to the Bethlehem town line just north of the Ammonoosuc River.

Interstate 93 runs along the southern edge of the CDP, with access from Exit 41 (Cottage Street/US 302) and Exit 42 (Meadow Street/US 302). I-93 leads northwest 19 miles (31 km) to St. Johnsbury, Vermont, and south through the White Mountains' Franconia Notch 85 miles (137 km) to Concord, the capital of New Hampshire. U.S. Route 302 is Littleton's Main Street. To the east it turns up Cottage Street and Bethlehem Road, leading 5 miles (8 km) to Bethlehem, while to the west it turns onto Meadow Street and leads southwest 21 miles (34 km) to Woodsville. New Hampshire Route 116 runs out of town on Union Street, leading northeast 10 miles (16 km) to Whitefield.

According to the U.S. Census Bureau, the Littleton CDP has a total area of 8.5 square miles (22.1 km^{2}), of which 8.5 square miles (21.9 km^{2}) are land and 0.1 square miles (0.2 km^{2}), or 1.07%, are water.

== Demographics ==
Historical population
Census	Pop.	Note	%±
1950	3,819		—
1960	3,355		−12.1%
1970	4,180		24.6%
1980	4,480		7.2%
1990	4,633		3.4%
2000	4,431		−4.4%
2010	4,412		−0.4%
2020	4,467		1.2%
U.S. Decennial Census

As of the census of 2010, there were 4,412 people, 2,013 households, and 1,154 families residing in the CDP. There were 2,253 housing units, of which 240, or 10.7%, were vacant. The racial makeup of the CDP was 96.1% white, 0.5% African American, 0.2% Native American, 1.0% Asian, 0.0% Pacific Islander, 0.5% some other race, and 1.6% from two or more races. 2.1% of the population were Hispanic or Latino of any race.

Of the 2,013 households in the CDP, 27.5% had children under the age of 18 living with them, 39.2% were headed by married couples living together, 13.8% had a female householder with no husband present, and 42.7% were non-families. 35.8% of all households were made up of individuals, and 14.9% were someone living alone who was 65 years of age or older. The average household size was 2.18, and the average family size was 2.78.

22.3% of residents in the CDP were under the age of 18, 7.6% were from age 18 to 24, 23.4% were from 25 to 44, 29.0% were from 45 to 64, and 17.7% were 65 years of age or older. The median age was 43.0 years. For every 100 females, there were 87.3 males. For every 100 females age 18 and over, there were 83.2 males.

For the period 2011–15, the estimated median annual income for a household was $36,550, and the median income for a family was $48,616. Male full-time workers had a median income of $37,099 versus $36,458 for females. The per capita income for the CDP was $24,176. 19.0% of the population and 11.7% of families were below the poverty line, along with 31.6% of people under the age of 18 and 14.3% of people 65 or older.

== Education ==
The municipality is in the Littleton School District, which operates Littleton High School.
