= Littleton, New Hampshire =

- Town
- Littleton, NH, from the west

- Seal

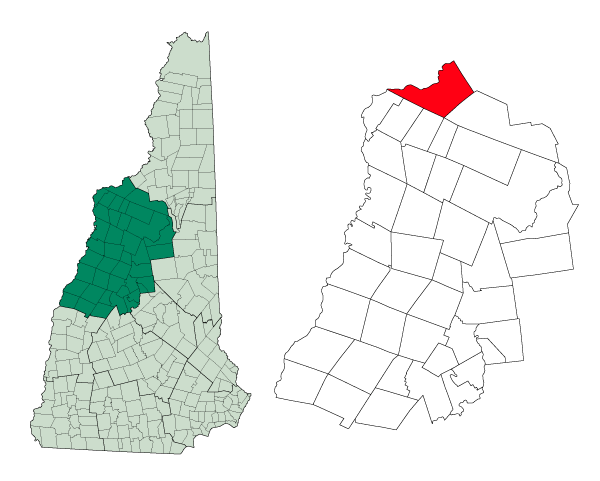
- Location in Grafton County, New Hampshire
- Coordinates: 44°19′56″N 71°48′35″W
- Country: United States
- State: New Hampshire
- County: Grafton
- Incorporated: 1784
- Villages: Littleton; Apthorp; North Littleton; Coreys Mobile Park; Newton Mobile Park; Gilman Mobile Park

Area
  - Total: 54.0 sq mi (139.9 km^{2})
  - Land: 50.0 sq mi (129.4 km^{2})
  - Water: 4.1 sq mi (10.5 km^{2}) 7.48%
- Elevation: 1,089 ft (332 m)

Population (2020)
  - Total: 6,005
  - Density: 120/sq mi (46.4/km^{2})
- Time zone: UTC-5 (Eastern)
  - Summer (DST): UTC-4 (Eastern)
- ZIP code: 03561
- Area code: 603
- FIPS code: 33-42580
- GNIS feature ID: 873649
- Website: www.townoflittleton.org

Littleton is a town in Grafton County, New Hampshire, United States. The population was 6,005 at the 2020 census. Situated at the northern edge of the White Mountains, Littleton is bounded on the northwest by the Connecticut River.

The main village in town, where 4,467 people lived at the 2020 census, is defined as the Littleton census-designated place (CDP); it is centered on the intersection of U.S. Route 302 with New Hampshire Route 116, along the Ammonoosuc River.

== History ==
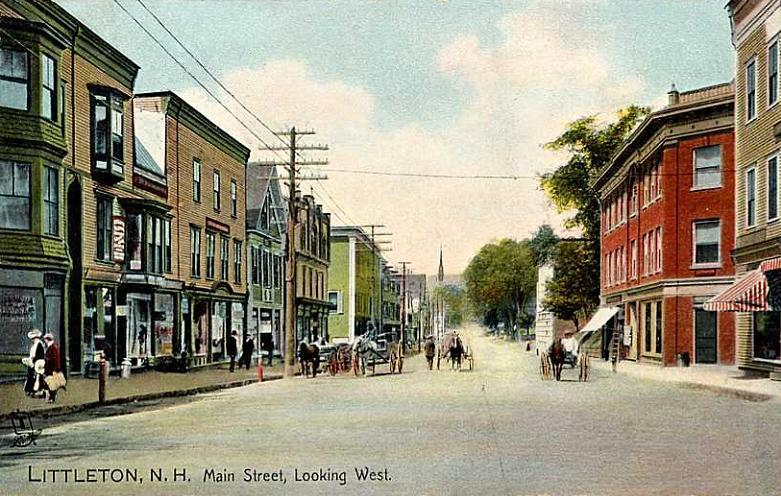
Main Street in 1908

Called "Chiswick" (Saxon for "Cheese Farm") in 1764, the area was settled in 1769. The town was part of Lisbon until 1770, when it was granted as "Apthorp" in honor of George Apthorp, head of one of the wealthiest mercantile establishments in Boston, Massachusetts. The land was later passed to the Apthorp family's associates from Newburyport, Massachusetts, headed by Colonel Moses Little. Colonel Little held the post of Surveyor of the King's Woods, and the town was named in his honor when it was incorporated in 1784, the same year New Hampshire became a state.

Located along the banks of the Ammonoosuc River is the Littleton Grist Mill. The historic mill first opened in 1798, and has been fully restored to its original appearance. Between 1867 and 1909, the local Kilburn Brothers factory published photographs and stereoviews, and sold stereoscopes, double-picture viewers popular in the Victorian age.

== Geography ==
According to the United States Census Bureau, the town has a total area of 54.0 square miles (139.9 km^{2}), of which 50.0 square miles (129.4 km^{2}) are land and 4.1 square miles (10.5 km^{2}) are water, comprising 7.48% of the town. The main village of Littleton, a census-designated place, has a total area of 8.6 square miles (22 km^{2}), of which 0.12% is water.

Littleton is drained by the Connecticut River and its tributary, the Ammonoosuc River. The Connecticut River serves as the state boundary with Vermont. The Moore Dam on the Connecticut forms Moore Reservoir in the north. The highest point in Littleton is the summit of Towns Mountain, at 2,203 feet (671 m) above sea level in the northeast part of town.

== Demographics ==
Historical population
Census	Pop.	Note	%±
1790	96		—
1800	381		296.9%
1810	873		129.1%
1820	1,096		25.5%
1830	1,435		30.9%
1840	1,778		23.9%
1850	2,008		12.9%
1860	2,292		14.1%
1870	2,446		6.7%
1880	2,936		20.0%
1890	3,365		14.6%
1900	4,066		20.8%
1910	4,069		0.1%
1920	4,239		4.2%
1930	4,558		7.5%
1940	4,571		0.3%
1950	4,817		5.4%
1960	5,003		3.9%
1970	5,290		5.7%
1980	5,558		5.1%
1990	5,827		4.8%
2000	5,845		0.3%
2010	5,928		1.4%
2020	6,005		1.3%
U.S. Decennial Census

As of the census of 2010, there were 5,928 people, 2,673 households, and 1,596 families residing in the town. The population density was 118.3 inhabitants per square mile (45.7/km^{2}). There were 3,065 housing units at an average density of 61.2 units/sq mi (23.6 units/km^{2}). The racial makeup of the town was 96.2% White, 0.4% African American, 0.3% Native American, 1.0% Asian, 0.5% some other race, and 1.6% from two or more races. 1.9% of the population were Hispanic or Latino of any race.

There were 2,673 households, out of which 26.9% had children under the age of 18 living with them, 43.5% were headed by married couples living together, 11.8% had a female householder with no husband present, and 40.3% were non-families. 33.1% of all households were made up of individuals, and 13.5% were someone living alone who was 65 years of age or older. The average household size was 2.21, and the average family size was 2.77.

In the town, the population was spread out, with 21.4% under the age of 18, 7.4% from 18 to 24, 23.3% from 25 to 44, 30.8% from 45 to 64, and 17.6% who were 65 years of age or older. The median age was 44.1 years. For every 100 females, there were 90.7 males. For every 100 females age 18 and over, there were 88.2 males.

For the time period 2007–2011, the estimated median annual income for a household in the town was $45,290, and the median income for a family was $50,921. Male full-time workers had a median income of $40,745 versus $32,972 for females. The per capita income for the town was $24,673. 7.5% of the population and 4.5% of families were below the poverty line. Out of the total people living in poverty, 7.9% were under the age of 18 and 10.1% were 65 or older.

== Arts and culture ==
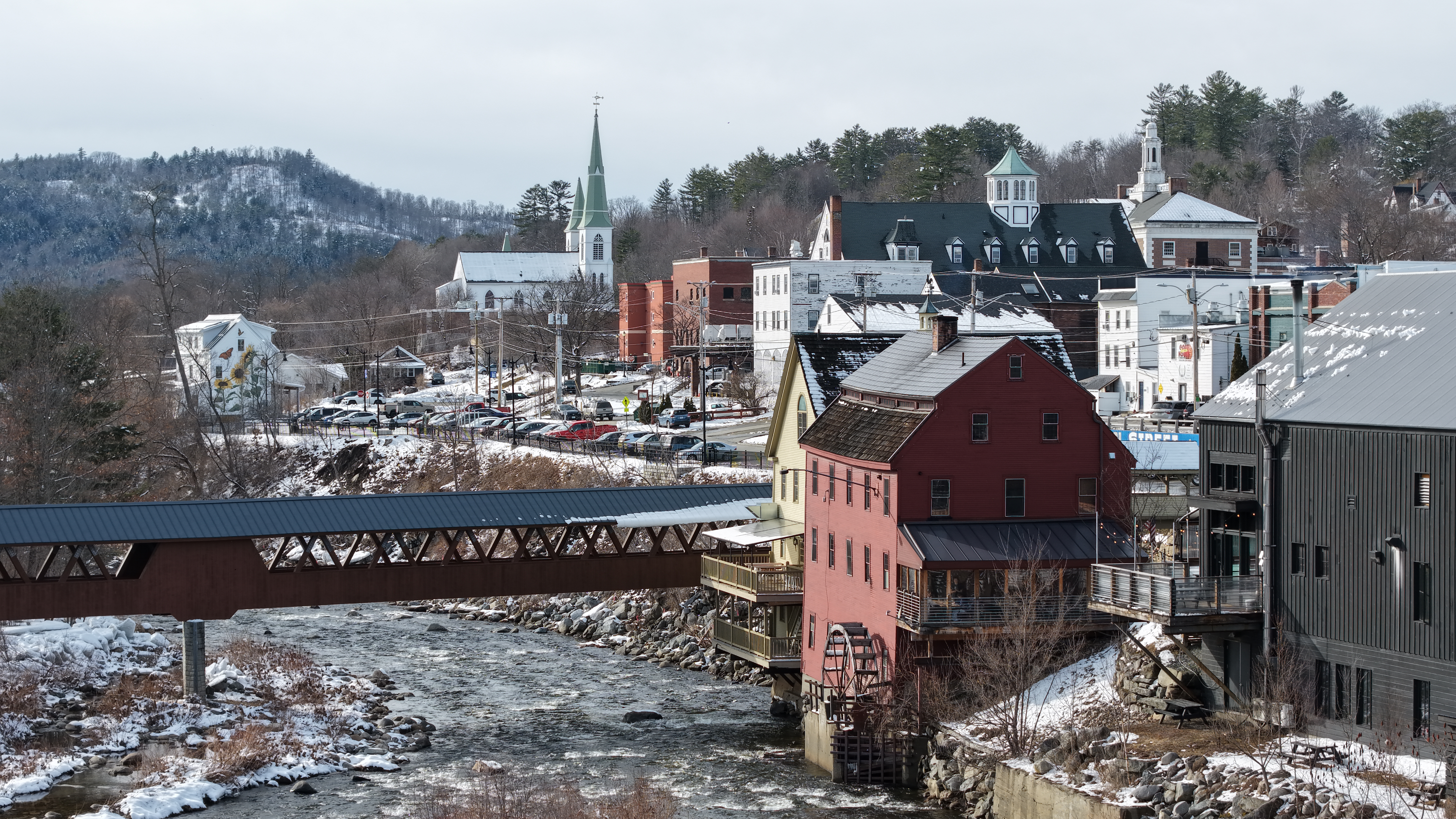
The Riverwalk Covered Bridge and the Ammonoosuc River, which runs through the town

=== Sites of interest ===
- Bronze statue of Eleanor H. Porter's creation, Pollyanna. It is located downtown, and was unveiled in 2002
- Kilburn Brothers Building – where stereo view cards were made
- The Riverwalk and Covered Bridge
- Downtown Historical Walk (marked by plaques on or near various buildings along Main Street)

=== On National Register of Historic Places ===
- Littleton Opera House
- United States Post Office and Courthouse–Littleton Main
- Edward H. Lane House
- Thayer's Hotel
- Littleton Community House & Annex

== Education ==
The municipality is in the Littleton School District, which operates Littleton High School.

== Infrastructure ==
=== Transportation ===
The center of Littleton is accessible from three exits of Interstate 93, and a fourth exit serves the western end of town near the Vermont border. U.S. Route 302 runs east–west through the town center as its Main Street. As of January 2006, Littleton is also served by a public transportation bus route connecting with Whitefield and Lancaster.

== Notable people ==
- Ann E. Bailie (born 1935), NASA mathematician
- Michael Cryans, member of the Executive Council of New Hampshire
- Rich Gale (born 1954), pitcher with five MLB teams
- Hugh Gallen (1924–1982), 74th governor of New Hampshire
- Geoffrey Hendricks (1931–2018), artist associated with Fluxus
- Erin Hennessey (born 1976), state senator
- Benjamin W. Kilburn (1827–1909), machinist, veteran and photographer
- Eleanor H. Porter (1868–1920), author of Pollyanna and Pollyanna Grows Up
- Melinda Rankin (1811–1888), missionary, teacher and writer
- Tor Seidler (born 1952), children's author
- Elizabeth Rowell Thompson (1821–1899), philanthropist
- Jack Tilton (1951–2017), art dealer

== See also ==
- Littleton Coin Company
