= Spaulding Turnpike =

Toll road in New Hampshire, US

Spaulding Turnpike
- Spaulding Turnpike highlighted in red

Route information
- Maintained by NHDOT
- Length: 33.26 mi (53.53 km)
- Existed: c. 1956–present
- Component highways: NH 16 entire length US 4 from Portsmouth to Dover

Major junctions
- South end: I-95 / US 1 Byp. in Portsmouth
- US 4 in Dover; NH 9 in Dover; US 202 / NH 11 in Rochester
- North end: NH 16 / NH 125 in Milton

Location
- Country: United States
- State: New Hampshire
- Counties: Rockingham, Strafford

Highway system
- New Hampshire Highway System; Interstate; US; State; Turnpikes

The Spaulding Turnpike is a 33.26-mile (53.53 km) controlled-access toll road in eastern New Hampshire. Its entire length is overlapped by New Hampshire Route 16 (NH 16). Its southern terminus is at the Portsmouth Traffic Circle (I-95/US 1 Byp.) in Portsmouth, a terminus it shares with US 4 and NH 16. Its northern terminus is at an interchange with NH 125 in Milton, where NH 16 continues north as a two-lane freeway.

The turnpike roughly parallels the Maine border. NH 16 was signed onto the Turnpike in the mid-1990s.

The turnpike is part of the New Hampshire Turnpike System operated by the New Hampshire Department of Transportation Bureau of Turnpikes. Along with I-95 between the Massachusetts state border and the Portsmouth Circle (Blue Star Turnpike), the two turnpikes are collectively known as the Eastern Turnpike.

== History ==
The turnpike is named for the Spaulding brothers of Rochester—Rolland H. Spaulding (1873–1942) and Huntley N. Spaulding (1869–1955)—who both served as Governor of New Hampshire. It was announced in August 1952 to connect Portsmouth and Rochester at a cost of $13.5 million. Work on the first section of the turnpike, between Portsmouth and Dover, started in 1954, with that segment opening in September 1956. The complete (as originally planned) 24-mile (39 km) route between Portsmouth and Rochester opened on August 29, 1957, the same day that the Everett Turnpike was dedicated. In 1977, the New Hampshire House of Representatives approved funding to extend the Spaulding Turnpike by 12 miles (19 km) north through Milton. Construction began in 1978, with the extension opening on August 20, 1981.

== Route description ==
The Spaulding Turnpike begins in Portsmouth, at I-95 northbound Exit 4. Access from I-95 south and US 1 Bypass is facilitated via Exit 5 (Portsmouth Traffic Circle). A northbound-only exit connects with Brady Drive, accessible only from the traffic circle. The Spaulding Turnpike becomes a six-lane freeway concurrent with US 4 and NH 16, with a 55 mph (90 km/h) speed limit. Exit 1 in Newington provides access to Pease International Tradeport and the Newington malls.

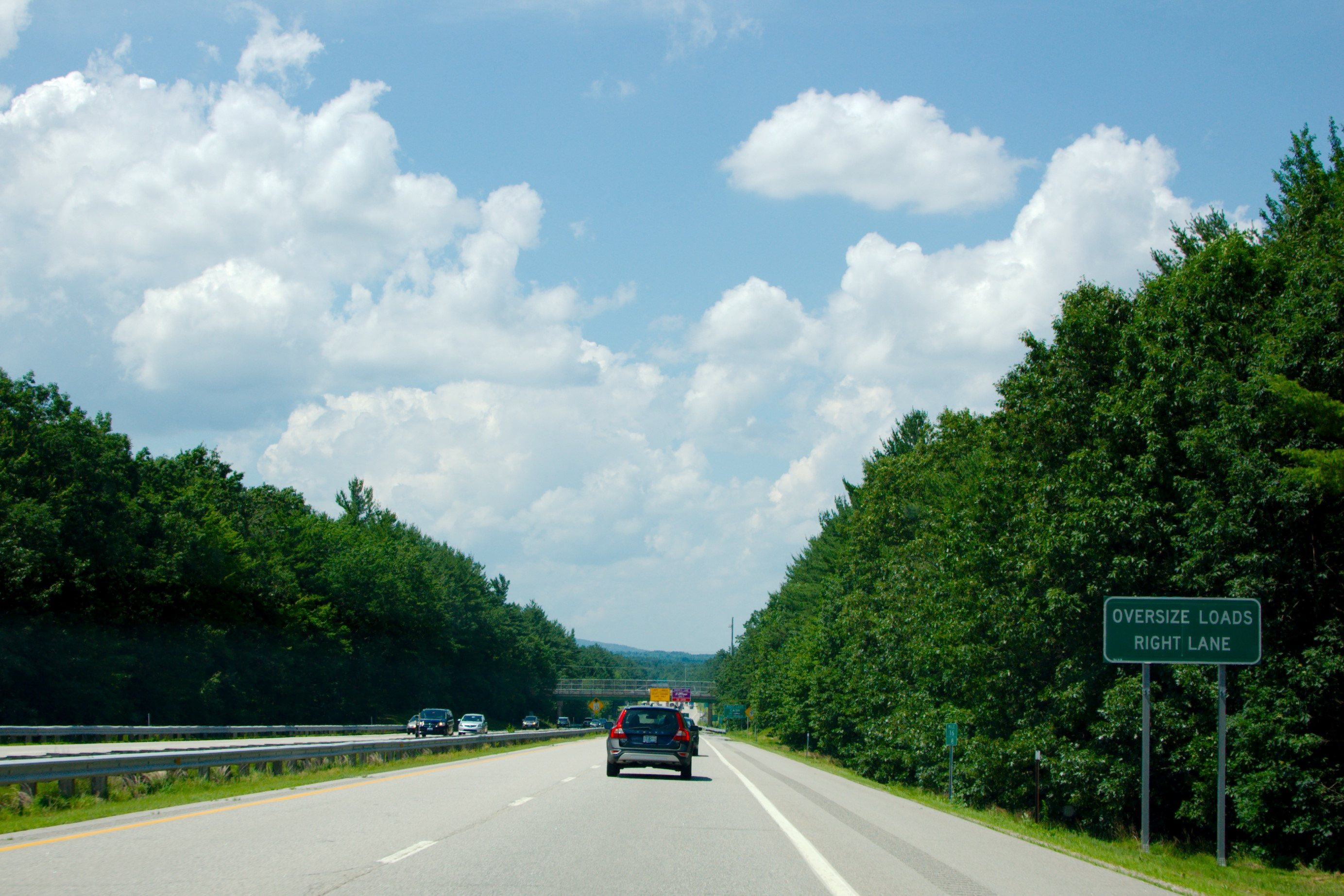
View along the Spaulding Turnpike approaching the Rochester toll

Exit 2, a northbound-only exit/entrance which facilitated access to the Mall at Fox Run and adjacent businesses, was closed permanently on July 19, 2015. Exit 3 is a full-access interchange with Woodbury Avenue, with a connection to Pease Tradeport via Arboretum Drive. Exit 4 provides access to Newington Village and businesses along Shattuck Way. The turnpike then crosses the Little Bay Bridge into Dover, with seven lanes (three northbound, and four southbound) for vehicles and a temporary pedestrian and bicycle path on the northbound shoulder of the bridge.

Exit 5 provides access to Hilton Park and Wentworth Terrace. This exit was permanently closed when the northbound lanes were shifted onto the permanent northbound alignment of the turnpike on November 28, 2018.

US 4 leaves the turnpike at Exit 6, with the Dover barrier toll located about 700 metres (770 yd) to the north. The reconstruction of Exit 6 into a full access diamond interchange between Dover and Durham was open to traffic on November 15, 2019. Before the reconstruction, there was no access from eastbound US 4 to the northbound turnpike or Dover Point Road north, nor from the southbound turnpike to Dover Point Road north. Traffic then had to utilise the Spaulding Turnpike southbound and turn around at Exit 4 in Newington in order to access the Spaulding Turnpike northbound or Dover Point Road north.

North of the toll gantry, the freeway passes west of downtown Dover. Exits 7 through 9 provide local access via NH 108, NH 9 and Indian Brook Drive, respectively. A park and ride facility is located on Indian Brook Drive just off Exit 9. North of Exit 9, the speed limit increases to 65 mph (105 km/h).

A gap in the exit numbering—there is no Exit 10—allows for future addition of an interchange with more direct access to Somersworth; such an exit has been under consideration "since the turnpike was built in the 1950s".

The turnpike continues north and crosses into Rochester, reaching the second barrier toll soon after. Exit 11 provides access to Old Dover Road, for northbound traffic only. The freeway expands to six lanes north of Exit 12 and bypasses downtown Rochester to the west. US 202 joins the freeway at Exit 13, near the site of a park and ride facility built in 2014. NH 11 joins the turnpike 1.6 miles (2.6 km) to the north at Exit 15. Both US 202 and NH 11 depart the turnpike at Exit 16 to East Rochester.

Immediately north of Exit 16, the turnpike becomes a two-lane freeway and the speed limit drops to 55 mph (90 km/h). The highway continues north into Milton, with Exits 17 and 18 providing local access via NH 75 and NH 125. The Spaulding Turnpike designation ends at Exit 18 near Union; NH 16 continues north as a two-lane freeway.

== Tolls ==
Two barrier tolls are present on the Spaulding Turnpike—one in Dover and one in Rochester. Travel anywhere south of exit 6, north of exit 11, or between the barrier tolls (exits 7 through 9) is free of charge.

=== Electronic tolling ===
In November 2021, the New Hampshire Department of Transportation announced the installation of all-electronic tolling and collection of funds using E-ZPass transponders that are scanned by sensors for payment.

=== Toll rates ===
Toll rates are determined by the class of vehicle (number of axles, single or dual rear tires). The NHDOT currently offers discounted tolls for customers utilizing E-ZPass transponders registered with the agency. The discount rates are 30 percent for Class 1-4 vehicles (single rear tires) and 10 percent for Class 5-12 vehicles (dual rear tires).

Class	Vehicle description	Cash fare	NH E-ZPass fare
1	2 axles, single rear tires	$0.75	$0.53
2	3 axles, single rear tires	$1.00	$0.70
3	4 axles, single rear tires	$1.25	$0.88
4	5 axles, single rear tires	$1.50	$1.05
5	2 axles, dual rear tires	$1.50	$1.35
6	3 axles, dual rear tires	$2.00	$1.80
7	4 axles, dual rear tires	$2.50	$2.25
8	5 axles, dual rear tires	$3.00	$2.70
9	6 axles, dual rear tires	$3.50	$3.15
10	7 axles, dual rear tires	$4.00	$3.60
11	8 axles, dual rear tires	$4.50	$4.05
12	9 axles, dual rear tires	$5.00	$4.50

== Exit list ==
County	Location	mi	km	Old exit	New exit	Destinations	Notes
Rockingham	Portsmouth	0.00– 0.77	0.00– 1.24		—	I-95 / US 1 Byp. – Portsmouth, Portland, Hampton, Boston US 4 begins / NH 16 begins	Southern terminus; southern terminus of NH 16; eastern terminus of US 4; Portsmouth Circle; exits 4-5 on I-95
Rockingham	Portsmouth	0.92	1.48		—	Brady Drive	Northbound exit and entrance; access from Portsmouth Circle only
Rockingham	Newington	1.59	2.56		1	Gosling Road – Pease International Tradeport	
Rockingham	Newington	2.38	3.83		2	Fox Run Road	Permanently closed July 16, 2015; access via exits 1 and 3
Rockingham	Newington	2.86	4.60		3	Woodbury Avenue	To Arboretum Drive and Pease International Tradeport
Rockingham	Newington	3.45	5.55		4	Nimble Hill Road / Shattuck Way – Newington Village	
Strafford	Dover	4.39	7.07		5	Hilton Park	Permanently closed on November 28, 2018; access via exit 6
Strafford	Dover	4.76	7.66	3	6	US 4 west / Dover Point Road – Durham, Concord	Northern end of US 4 concurrency; full-access interchange opened on November 15, 2019
Strafford	Dover	5.01	8.06		6N	Dover Point Road – Dover	Northbound exit only; closed on December 15, 2016 for widening of turnpike roadbed and construction of new exit 6; new exit 6 utilises footprint of existing off-ramp
Strafford	Dover	5.5	8.9	Dover Toll Gantry			
Strafford	Dover	9.14	14.71	4	7	NH 108 (Durham Road / Central Avenue) – Dover, Durham	
Strafford	Dover	9.45	15.21	5	8	NH 9 (Knox Marsh Road) to NH 155 – Downtown Dover, Madbury	Signed as exits 8E (east) and 8W (west)
Strafford	Dover	12.24	19.70	6	9	To NH 9 / NH 108 – Dover, Somersworth	Access via Indian Brook Drive
Strafford	Rochester	17.3	27.8	Rochester Toll Gantry			
Strafford	Rochester	18.20	29.29		11	Old Dover Road – Rochester	Northbound exit only
Strafford	Rochester	18.45	29.69	7	12	NH 125 (Gonic Road / Columbus Avenue) – Rochester, Gonic	
Strafford	Rochester	19.66	31.64	8	13	US 202 west (Washington Street) – Rochester, Concord	Southern end of US 202 concurrency
Strafford	Rochester	20.76	33.41	9	14	Ten Rod Road – Rochester	Northbound exit and southbound entrance
Strafford	Rochester	21.26	34.21	10	15	NH 11 west (Farmington Road) / North Main Street – Farmington, Alton	Southern end of NH 11 concurrency
Strafford	Rochester	22.02	35.44		16	US 202 east / NH 11 east to NH 125 – East Rochester, Sanford ME	Northern end of US 202/NH 11 concurrency
Strafford	Milton	27.40	44.10		17	NH 75 (Farmington Road) to NH 125 – Milton, Farmington	
Strafford	Milton	33.11	53.29		18	NH 125 (White Mountain Highway) – Union, Milton Mills	
Strafford	Milton	33.26	53.53			NH 16 north (White Mountain Highway) – Ossipee, Conway	Continuation north; northern end of NH 16 concurrency
1.000 mi = 1.609 km; 1.000 km = 0.621 mi: Closed/former; Concurrency terminus; Electronic toll collection; Incomplete access

Sourcing for old exit numbering:

== See also ==
- New Hampshire Highway System
