= New Hampshire Route 11 =

State highway in central New Hampshire, US

New Hampshire Route 11
- Map of central New Hampshire with NH 11 highlighted in red

Route information
- Maintained by NHDOT
- Length: 108.223 mi (174.168 km)

Major junctions
- West end: VT 11 at the Vermont state line in Charlestown
- I-89 in New London; US 4 in Andover; US 3 / NH 3A / NH 127 in Franklin; I-93 in Tilton; US 3 in Gilford; US 202 / NH 16 / Spaulding Turnpike in Rochester
- East end: US 202 / SR 11 at the Maine state line in Rochester

Location
- Country: United States
- State: New Hampshire
- Counties: Sullivan, Merrimack, Belknap, Strafford

Highway system
- New Hampshire Highway System; Interstate; US; State; Turnpikes
← NH 10A	→ NH 12
← Route 10	N.E.	→ Route 12

New Hampshire Route 11 is a 108.223-mile-long (174.168 km) east–west state highway in New Hampshire, running completely across the central part of the state. Its western terminus is at the Vermont state line in Charlestown, where it continues west as Vermont Route 11. The eastern terminus is at the Maine state line in Rochester, where it crosses the border with U.S. Route 202 and continues as Maine State Route 11.

Its number is derived from its original 1925 designation as New England Interstate Route 11.

The highway follows a generally southwest to northeast alignment from the Vermont state line until reaching Lake Winnipesaukee, then turns southeast for the remainder of its routing to the Maine state line.

There are 3 auxiliary routes, labeled 11A through 11C, all located along the shores of Lake Winnipesaukee, and an additional former auxiliary route, 11D, which is still known by that name.

== Route description ==
=== Charlestown to Newport ===
NH 11 begins on the western bank of the Connecticut River, where VT 11 crosses from Springfield, Vermont, into Charlestown, New Hampshire, just feet from its intersection with US 5. Just north of the town center, the highway meets and joins NH 12 north towards Claremont. NH 11 and NH 12 are cosigned for 9.9 miles (15.9 km). NH 12A, a western bypass of downtown Claremont, splits off just south of the city line. In downtown Claremont NH 11 leaves NH 12 and NH 103 joins eastbound, starting a longer 13.0-mile (20.9 km) concurrency. The two highways cross the Sugar River and meet the southern terminus of NH 120 before continuing east towards Newport. In downtown Newport, NH 11 and 103 briefly join NH 10 before turning east again to leave town. The two routes continue east for another 3.2 miles (5.1 km) before NH 103 splits off to the southeast.

=== Sunapee to Franklin ===
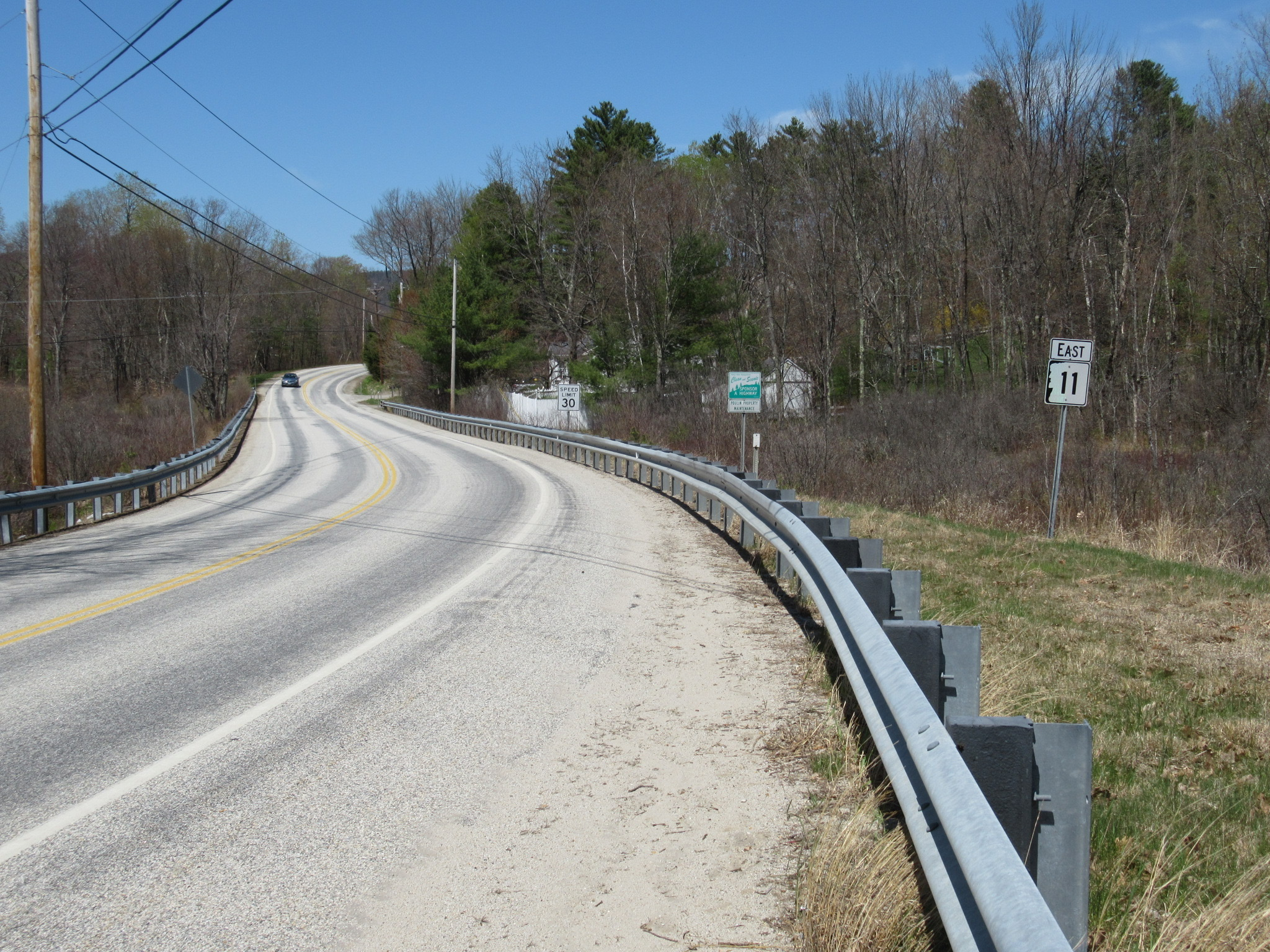
NH 11 in East Andover, NH

NH 11 continues east into Sunapee until reaching the town center, where it meets NH 103B, a connector to the Mount Sunapee Resort. NH 11 turns northward along the western side of Lake Sunapee and rounds the northern end of the lake at Georges Mills, turning back to the east. NH 11 enters the town of New London, meets the northern terminus of NH 103A (which runs along the east side of the lake) and immediately turns onto Interstate 89 south (at exit 12). NH 11 runs along I-89 for 3.0 miles (4.8 km) before departing at exit 11. After leaving I-89, NH 11 continues east, crossing NH 114 before entering the town of Wilmot. Continuing east into Andover, the highway meets the southern terminus of NH 4A then joins US 4 for 2.7 miles (4.3 km). NH 11 then splits off, continuing northeast into Franklin. The road meets NH 3A near the west bank of the Pemigewasset River, and NH 11 turns south along NH 3A into downtown Franklin.

=== Franklin to Gilford (duplex with US 3) ===
Upon reaching the town center, NH 3A ends while NH 11 turns east joining US 3 and NH 127 to cross the Pemigewasset where it meets the Merrimack River. NH 127 immediately splits off to the north, then US 3 and NH 11 continue east across the Winnipesaukee River, paralleling it into Tilton. In the center of Tilton, the road intersects with NH 132 just feet north of the Northfield town line. NH 132 joins US 3 and NH 11 as the road turns northeast, continuing to parallel the Winnipesaukee River's west side. The highway interchanges with Interstate 93 near the western terminus of NH 140, then NH 132 splits off to the north. Continuing northeast, US 3 and NH 11 cross Lake Winnisquam and skirt the northern tip of Belmont. Just before reaching the city line with Laconia, US 3 and NH 11 split off onto the Gilford-Laconia Bypass, a freeway bypass of those two towns (the historic surface alignment continues into downtown as NH 11A and US 3 Business). The freeway bypasses downtown Laconia to the south, interchanging with NH 106 and NH 107 before crossing into Gilford, where the road turns due north and interchanges with NH 11A. The freeway ends 1.5 miles (2.4 km) to the north, near Laconia Airport, and NH 11 splits off from US 3 after a 17.6-mile (28.3 km) concurrency.

=== Gilford to Rochester ===
After splitting from US 3, NH 11 intersects with NH 11C and NH 11B as it heads towards Lake Winnipesaukee. The highway turns southeast along the southern end of the lake and crosses into the town of Alton. NH 11 intersects the eastern terminus of NH 11A before continuing south along the west side of Alton Bay. This section of the highway has views of the bay and of Lake Winnipesaukee as a whole. Route 11D (formerly NH 11D) provides local residential access along this semi-limited access section. NH 11 descends into Alton village and intersects with NH 28A, which runs up the eastern side of the bay. NH 11 and NH 28A overlap through the downtown area (although NH 28A is only signed in the northbound/westbound direction), passing the eastern terminus of NH 140 before meeting NH 28 at a large roundabout, where NH 28A ends. NH 11 continues southeast through New Durham without any major intersections before continuing into Farmington. NH 11 bypasses downtown Farmington to the southwest, with NH 75 and NH 153 providing local access. The highway continues southeast and crosses into the city of Rochester. NH 11 as a standalone route ends at its interchange with the Spaulding Turnpike (NH 16) and US 202, where it leaves its surface alignment and joins the Turnpike at exit 15. NH 11 exits the Turnpike at exit 16 with US 202 after less than 1/4 mile (0.40 km) and interchanges with NH 125, which provides local access to downtown Rochester. US 202 and NH 11 continue through the district of East Rochester before crossing the Salmon Falls River into Lebanon, Maine. US 202 continues across the border while NH 11 becomes Maine State Route 11 and changes cardinal directions to north-south.

== Junction list ==
County	Location	mi	km	Destinations	Notes
Sullivan	Charlestown	0.000	0.000	VT 11 west (Charlestown Road) to I-91 – Springfield	Continuation into Vermont
Sullivan	Charlestown	0.938	1.510	NH 12 south (North Main Street) – Charlestown, Walpole	Western end of concurrency with NH 12
Sullivan	Charlestown	4.801	7.726	NH 12A north (River Road) – North Charlestown, Ascutney, VT	Southern terminus of NH 12A
Sullivan	Claremont	10.839	17.444	NH 12 north / NH 103 west (Main Street)	Eastern end of concurrency with NH 12; western end of concurrency with NH 103
Sullivan	Claremont	11.058	17.796	NH 120 north (Hanover Street) – Lebanon	Southern terminus of NH 120
Sullivan	Newport	20.465	32.935	NH 10 south (South Main Street) – Goshen, Keene	Western end of concurrency with NH 10
Sullivan	Newport	20.696	33.307	NH 10 north (North Main Street) – Grantham	Eastern end of concurrency with NH 10
Sullivan	Sunapee	23.842	38.370	NH 103 east – Newbury, Bradford	Eastern end of concurrency with NH 103
Sullivan	Sunapee	26.267	42.273	NH 103B south (Edgemont Road) – Newbury	Northern terminus of NH 103B
Merrimack	New London	31.336	50.430	NH 103A south (Lakeside Road) – Blodgett Landing, Newbury	Northern terminus of NH 103A
Merrimack	New London	31.791	51.163	I-89 north – Springfield, Lebanon	Exit 12 on I-89; western end of concurrency with I-89
Merrimack	New London	34.751	55.926	I-89 south – Sutton, Concord	Exit 11 on I-89; eastern end of concurrency with I-89
Merrimack	New London	36.393	58.569	NH 114 (Main Street / Sutton Road) – New London, North Sutton	
Merrimack	Andover	42.076	67.715	NH 4A north (Fourth New Hampshire Turnpike) – Wilmot, Enfield, Lebanon	Southern terminus of NH 4A
Merrimack	Andover	42.834	68.935	US 4 west (Depot Street) – Danbury, Grafton, Canaan	Western end of concurrency with US 4
Merrimack	Andover	45.596	73.380	US 4 east (Salisbury Highway) – Salisbury, Concord	Eastern end of concurrency with US 4
Merrimack	Franklin	54.516	87.735	NH 3A north (Hill Road) – Hill, Bristol	Western end of concurrency with NH 3A
Merrimack	Franklin	55.536	89.377	US 3 south / NH 127 south (South Main Street) – Salisbury, Concord NH 3A ends	Southern terminus of NH 3A; western end of concurrency with US 3/NH 127
Merrimack	Franklin	55.934	90.017	NH 127 north (West Bow Street) – New Hampton	Eastern end of concurrency with NH 127
Belknap	Tilton	59.154	95.199	NH 132 south (Park Street) to I-93 south – Northfield, Concord	Western end of concurrency with NH 132
Belknap	Tilton	60.432– 60.815	97.256– 97.872	I-93 – Canterbury, Concord, Boston, New Hampton, Plymouth	Exit 20 on I-93
Belknap	Tilton	60.755	97.776	NH 140 east (Tilton Road) – Belmont, Gilmanton	Western terminus of NH 140
Belknap	Tilton	60.907	98.020	NH 132 north (Sanborn Road) – Sanbornton	Eastern end of concurrency with NH 132
Belknap	Belmont	67.074	107.945	US 3 Bus. north / NH 11A east (Court Street) – Laconia downtown	Southern terminus of US 3 Business, western terminus of NH 11A. Start of Super 2 section (Laconia Bypass)
Belknap	Laconia	68.584	110.375	NH 106 (Belmont Road) to NH 107 – Laconia, Belmont, Concord	Partial interchange; no westbound exit to NH 106 north; no eastbound entrance from NH 106 south
Belknap	Laconia	69.228	111.412	NH 107 (Province Road) – Laconia, Gilmanton	Partial interchange; westbound exit and eastbound entrance
Belknap	Gilford	70.269	113.087	NH 11A (Gilford Avenue) – Gilford, Laconia	Interchange
Belknap	Gilford	73.121	117.677	US 3 north (Lake Shore Road) to NH 107 – Laconia, Weirs Beach, Meredith	Interchange; eastern end of concurrency with US 3 Northern terminus of Super 2 section (Laconia Bypass)
Belknap	Gilford	73.359	118.060	NH 11C north (Lily Pond Road) – Laconia Airport	Southern terminus of NH 11C
Belknap	Gilford	74.900	120.540	NH 11B (Weirs Road/Old Lake Shore Road) – Gilford, Weirs Beach	
Belknap	Alton	81.438	131.062	NH 11A west (Cherry Valley Road) – Gilford Vil.	Eastern terminus of NH 11A
Belknap	Alton	88.058	141.716	NH 28A north (East Side Drive)	Western end of concurrency with NH 28A, NH 28A not signed eastbound
Belknap	Alton	89.219	143.584	NH 140 west (Frank C. Gilman Highway) – Gilmanton	Eastern terminus of NH 140
Belknap	Alton	89.764– 90.038	144.461– 144.902	NH 28 (Suncook Valley Road) – Barnstead, Manchester, Wolfeboro, Ossipee NH 28A ends	Roundabout; southern terminus of NH 28A
Strafford	Farmington	98.277	158.162	NH 75 east (Central Street) – Farmington	Western terminus of NH 75
Strafford	Farmington	100.057	161.026	NH 153 north (South Main Street) – Farmington, Middleton, Union	Southern terminus of NH 153
Strafford	Rochester	104.973	168.938	US 202 west / NH 16 south / Spaulding Turnpike south – Dover, Portsmouth	Exit 15 on Spaulding Turnpike; western end of concurrency with US 202/NH 16
Strafford	Rochester	105.189	169.285	NH 16 north / Spaulding Turnpike north – Ossipee, Conway	Exit 16 on Spaulding Turnpike; eastern end of concurrency with NH 16
Strafford	Rochester	106.047	170.666	NH 125 (Milton Road) – Rochester, Milton	Interchange
Strafford	Rochester	108.223	174.168	US 202 east / SR 11 north (Carl Broggi Highway) – Sanford	Continuation into Maine
1.000 mi = 1.609 km; 1.000 km = 0.621 mi: Concurrency terminus; Incomplete access

== Suffixed routes ==
=== New Hampshire Route 11A ===
New Hampshire Route 11A
- Location: Belmont–Alton
- Length: 12.852 mi (20.683 km)

New Hampshire Route 11A is a 12.852-mile-long (20.683 km) east–west state highway. Its western terminus is at US 3 and NH 11 in Belmont, just west of the Laconia city line. Its eastern terminus is in the town of Alton at NH 11. Its western section in downtown Laconia is partly overlapped by US 3 Business and NH 107.

NH 11A passes through the center of Gilford. Gunstock Mountain Resort, a ski area, is also located along the route.

=== New Hampshire Route 11B ===
New Hampshire Route 11B
- Location: Gilford–Laconia
- Length: 5.185 mi (8.344 km)

New Hampshire Route 11B, is a 5.185-mile-long (8.344 km) north–south state highway in the Lakes Region. Its northern terminus is at US 3 in Laconia on the shore of Lake Winnipesaukee. The southern terminus is at NH 11A in Gilford.

=== New Hampshire Route 11C ===
New Hampshire Route 11C
- Location: Gilford
- Length: 1.734 mi (2.791 km)

New Hampshire Route 11C is a short north–south state highway running for 1.734 miles (2.791 km) entirely within the town of Gilford. Its southern terminus is at NH 11, just east of the northern end of the US 3 / NH 11 Super 2 freeway, and near the Laconia Municipal Airport. The northern terminus is at NH 11B. The road is named Lily Pond Road along its entire length.

== Former routes ==
=== New Hampshire Route 11D ===
New Hampshire Route 11D
- Location: Alton
- Length: 3.29 mi (5.29 km)

New Hampshire Route 11D was a short state highway running for 3.29 miles (5.29 km) entirely within the town of Alton. The road is no longer signed or maintained by the New Hampshire Department of Transportation, but the road is still named "Route 11D." It acts as a local-traffic loop parallel to NH 11 along Alton Bay.

== Concurrent routes ==
- New Hampshire Route 12: 9.9 miles (15.9 km), Charlestown to Claremont
- New Hampshire Route 103: 13.0 miles (20.9 km), Claremont to Newport
- New Hampshire Route 10: 0.23 miles (0.37 km), Newport
- Interstate 89: 3.0 miles (4.8 km), New London
- U.S. Route 4: 2.7 miles (4.3 km), Andover
- New Hampshire Route 3A: 1.02 miles (1.64 km), Franklin
- U.S. Route 3: 17.6 miles (28.3 km), Franklin to Gilford
- New Hampshire Route 127: 0.40 miles (0.64 km), Franklin
- New Hampshire Route 132: 1.75 miles (2.82 km), Tilton
- New Hampshire Route 28A: 1.71 miles (2.75 km), Alton
- Spaulding Turnpike (NH 16): 0.21 miles (0.34 km), Rochester
- U.S. Route 202: 3.25 miles (5.23 km), Rochester

== Related routes ==
- New England Interstate Route 11, the designation carried by NH 11 in the early 1920s
