= New Hampshire Route 153 =

State highway in eastern New Hampshire, US

New Hampshire Route 153
- Map of eastern New Hampshire with NH 153 highlighted in red

Route information
- Maintained by NHDOT and MaineDOT
- Length: 50.566 mi (81.378 km): New Hampshire: 48.613 mi (78.235 km); Maine: 1.953 mi (3.143 km)

Major junctions
- South end: NH 11 in Farmington
- NH 16 / NH 125 in Wakefield; NH 25 in Effingham
- North end: NH 16 / NH 113 in Conway

Location
- Country: United States
- State: New Hampshire
- Counties: Strafford, Carroll, York (ME)

Highway system
- New Hampshire Highway System; Interstate; US; State; Turnpikes
← NH 152	→ NH 155

New Hampshire Route 153 is a 50.566-mile-long (81.378 km) secondary north–south highway in Strafford and Carroll counties in eastern New Hampshire. The southern terminus is in Farmington at New Hampshire Route 11. The northern terminus is in Conway village (town of Conway) at New Hampshire Route 16 and New Hampshire Route 113.

Between the towns of Wakefield and Effingham, NH 153 crosses into Maine, running for 1.9 miles (3.1 km) within the town of Parsonsfield. The Maine Department of Transportation has installed Maine-style route shields along this section of the road, but the highway retains its New Hampshire designation. NH 153 is unrelated to Maine State Route 153, which is located over 150 miles (240 km) to the northeast.

NH 153 is one of two New Hampshire state highways that run within Maine; the other is NH 113B.

== Route description ==
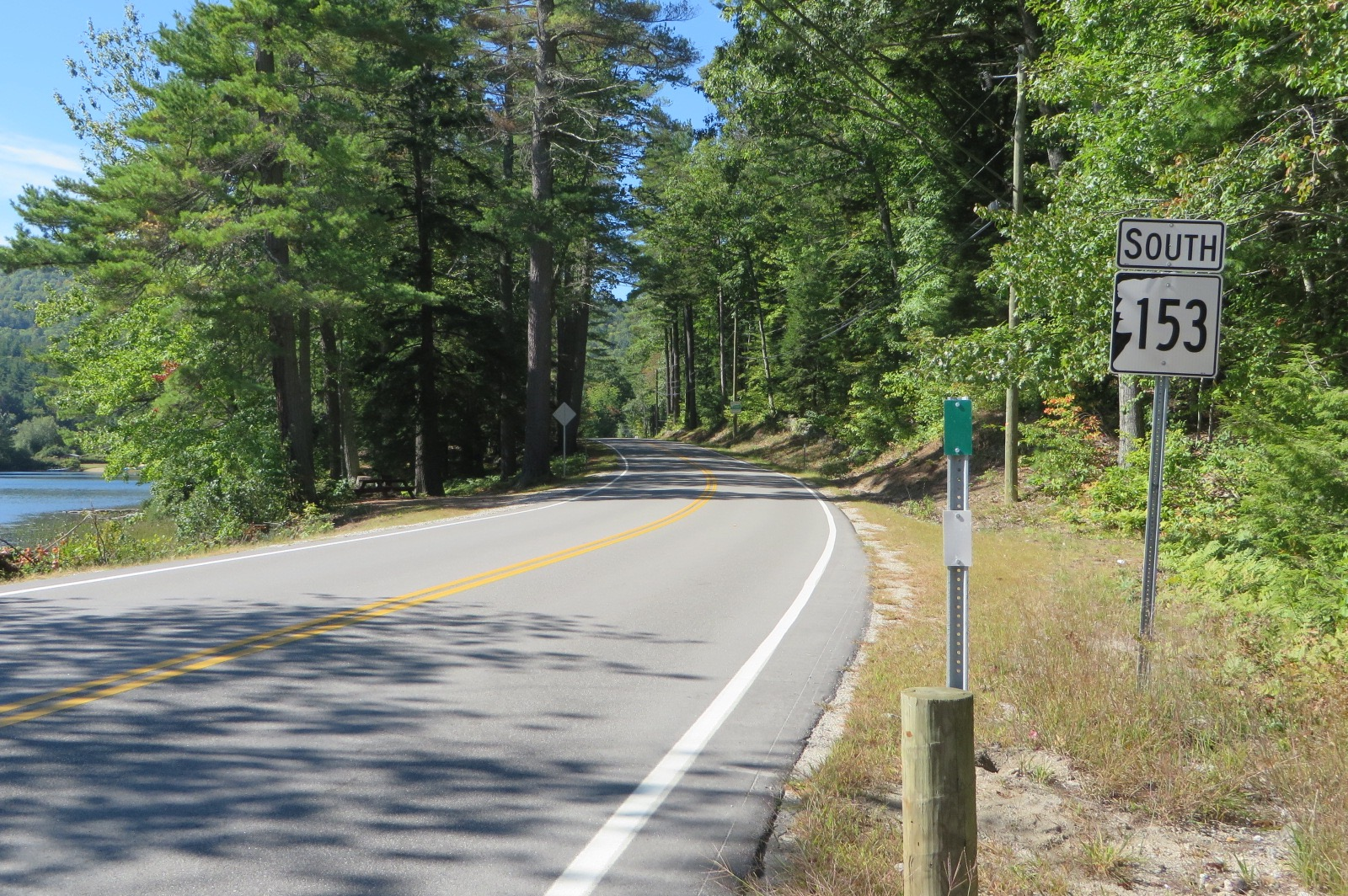
NH 153 in the town of Eaton

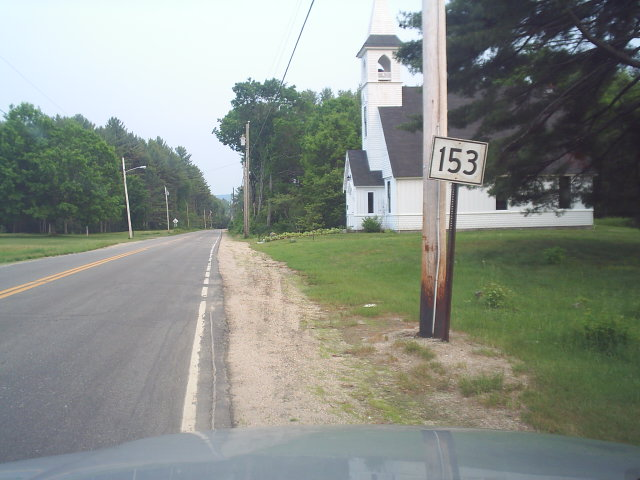
Maine-style shield on NH 153

NH 153 begins at NH 11 south of downtown Farmington and becomes the main road through town. NH 153 briefly overlaps with NH 75 in the center of town before continuing north. The highway skirts the western corner of Milton and continues into Middleton. Just south of downtown, NH 153 turns east and continues into Wakefield where it meets NH 125 in the village of Union. NH 125 and NH 153 are briefly cosigned before intersecting with NH 16 (the White Mountain Highway). NH 125 has its northern terminus here, while NH 153 continues north, paralleling NH 16 towards the village of Sanbornville. NH 153 briefly overlaps with NH 109 in the village center, then continues north towards East Wakefield. The highway approaches the state border near Province Lake, then crosses the border into Parsonsfield, Maine.

NH 153 passes the Province Lake Country Club and proceeds due north along the state border, before turning fully back into New Hampshire in the town of Effingham. The highway continues north, continuing to parallel the border until meeting NH 25 at the Ossipee River. NH 153 turns west along NH 25 for 0.9 miles (1.4 km), then turns north and crosses the river into Freedom. NH 153 continues through Freedom and Eaton without any major intersections, then crosses into the town of Conway, where it terminates in the center of Conway village at Main Street (NH 16 / NH 113).

== Major intersections ==
State	County	Location	mi	km	Destinations	Notes
New Hampshire	Strafford	Farmington	0.000	0.000	NH 11 – Rochester, Alton	Southern terminus; road continues as Meetinghouse Hill Road
New Hampshire	Strafford	Farmington	1.685	2.712	NH 75 east (Elm Street) – Milton	Southern end of concurrency with NH 75
New Hampshire	Strafford	Farmington	1.876	3.019	NH 75 west (Central Street) to NH 11	Northern end of concurrency with NH 75
New Hampshire	Carroll	Wakefield	9.997	16.089	NH 125 south (Main Street south) – Milton	Southern end of concurrency with NH 125
New Hampshire	Carroll	Wakefield	10.282	16.547	NH 125 begin / NH 16 (White Mountain Highway) – Ossipee, Rochester	Northern terminus of NH 125
New Hampshire	Carroll	Wakefield	14.058	22.624	NH 109 south (Lovell Lake Road) – Acton ME	Southern end of concurrency with NH 109
New Hampshire	Carroll	Wakefield	14.250	22.933	NH 109 north (Meadow Street) to NH 16 – Brookfield, Wolfeboro	Northern end of concurrency with NH 109
New Hampshire	Carroll	Wakefield	21.779– 21.803	35.050– 35.089	To SR 110 / Stevens Corner Road – West Newfield ME	
Shore of Province Lake			25.175	40.515	New Hampshire–Maine border	
Maine	York	Parsonsfield			No major junctions	
			27.128	43.658	Maine–New Hampshire border	
New Hampshire	Carroll	Effingham	34.552	55.606	NH 25 east (Porter Road) – Portland ME	Southern end of concurrency with NH 25
New Hampshire	Carroll	Effingham	35.430	57.019	NH 25 west (Ossipee Trail) – Center Ossipee, Meredith	Northern end of concurrency with NH 25
New Hampshire	Carroll	Conway	50.566	81.378	NH 16 / NH 113 (Main Street) – Portsmouth, North Conway, Fryeburg ME	Northern terminus; road continues as Washington Street
1.000 mi = 1.609 km; 1.000 km = 0.621 mi: Concurrency terminus
