= Northeast Pond =

Lake in the United States

- Location within Maine Location within New Hampshire Location within the United States
- Location: Strafford County, New Hampshire; York County, Maine
- Coordinates: 43°26′54″N 70°57′57″W
- Primary inflows: Salmon Falls River; Branch River
- Primary outflows: Salmon Falls River
- Catchment area: 102 square miles (260 km^{2})
- Basin countries: United States
- Max. length: 2.7 mi (4.3 km)
- Max. width: 0.9 mi (1.4 km)
- Surface area: 645 acres (2.61 km^{2})
- Average depth: 7 ft (2.1 m)
- Max. depth: 40 ft (12 m)
- Water volume: 6,938 acre⋅ft (8,558,000 m^{3})
- Residence time: 23.7 days
- Shore length^{1}: 9.6 mi (15.4 km)
- Surface elevation: 413 ft (126 m)
- Settlements: Milton, New Hampshire; Lebanon, Maine
- ^{1} Shore length is not a well-defined measure.

Northeast Pond is a 645-acre (2.61 km^{2}) water body located along the border between Strafford County, New Hampshire, and York County, Maine, in the northeastern United States. The lake lies in the towns of Milton, New Hampshire, and Lebanon, Maine. It connects with Milton Pond to the south, whose outlet is the Salmon Falls River. Together with Town House Pond, a northwestern arm of Milton Pond, the water bodies form a single lake network known as Milton Three Ponds.

The lake is classified as a cold- and warmwater fishery, with observed species including largemouth bass, smallmouth bass, chain pickerel, horned pout, white perch, yellow perch, and black crappie, and with rainbow and brown trout found in the deeper areas of the lakes.

== See also ==
- List of lakes in Maine
- List of lakes in New Hampshire
