= NH 16 =

NH 16 may refer to:

- National Highway 16 (India)
- New Hampshire Route 16, United States
