= NH 75 =

NH 75 may refer to:

- National Highway 75 (India)
- New Hampshire Route 75, United States
