= Farmington (CDP), New Hampshire =

Census-designated place in New Hampshire, United States

Farmington, New Hampshire
- Census-designated place
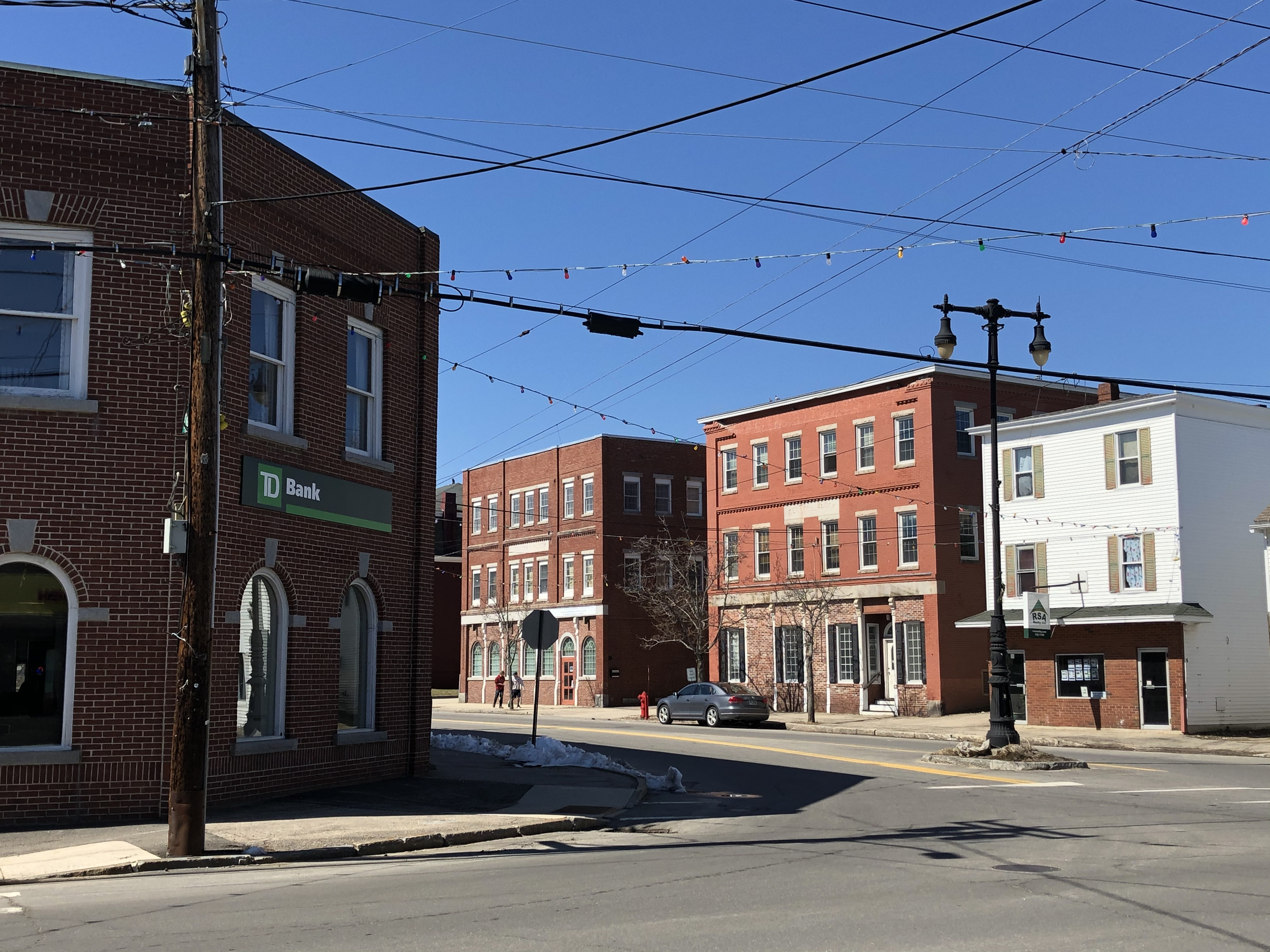
- Intersection of Central and Main streets in Farmington

- Location within New Hampshire Location within the United States
- Coordinates: 43°23′23″N 71°03′54″W
- Country: United States
- State: New Hampshire
- County: Strafford
- Town: Farmington

Area
  - Total: 6.26 sq mi (16.21 km^{2})
  - Land: 6.26 sq mi (16.21 km^{2})
  - Water: 0 sq mi (0.00 km^{2})
- Elevation: 440 ft (130 m)

Population (2020)
  - Total: 3,824
  - Density: 611.2/sq mi (235.97/km^{2})
- Time zone: UTC-5 (Eastern (EST))
  - Summer (DST): UTC-4 (EDT)
- ZIP code: 03835
- Area code: 603
- FIPS code: 33-25940
- GNIS feature ID: 2378064

Farmington is a census-designated place (CDP) and the main village in the town of Farmington, New Hampshire, United States. The population of the CDP was 3,824 at the 2020 census, out of 6,722 in the entire town.

== Geography ==
The CDP is in the northern part of the town of Farmington, in the valley of the Cocheco River and surrounding rural land. It is bordered to the northeast by the town of Milton, to the north by Middleton, and to the northwest by New Durham. New Hampshire Route 11 forms the southwestern border of the CDP, and Pokamoonshine Brook forms the southern border, while the Cocheco River forms part of the eastern border, along with Chestnut Hill Road and New Hampshire Route 75.

New Hampshire Route 11 leads southeast 7 miles (11 km) to Rochester and northwest 9 miles (14 km) to Alton. Route 75 passes through the center of Farmington as Central Street and Elm Street, leading northeast 5 miles (8 km) to Milton. New Hampshire Route 153 is Farmington's Main Street, leading north 8 miles (13 km) to Union.

According to the U.S. Census Bureau, the Farmington CDP has a total area of 6.3 square miles (16.2 km^{2}), all of it recorded as land. The Cocheco River passes through the western and southern parts of the CDP, flowing southeast to Rochester and Dover.

== Demographics ==
Historical population
Census	Pop.	Note	%±
1950	2,285		—
1960	2,241		−1.9%
1970	2,884		28.7%
1980	3,284		13.9%
1990	3,567		8.6%
2000	3,468		−2.8%
2010	3,885		12.0%
2020	3,824		−1.6%
U.S. Decennial Census

As of the census of 2010, there were 3,885 people, 1,510 households, and 1,000 families residing in the CDP. There were 1,645 housing units, of which 135, or 8.2%, were vacant. The racial makeup of the CDP was 96.4% white, 0.4% African American, 0.3% Native American, 0.7% Asian, 0.2% Pacific Islander, 0.1% some other race, and 1.9% from two or more races. 0.9% of the population were Hispanic or Latino of any race.

Of the 1,510 households in the CDP, 34.8% had children under the age of 18 living with them, 44.6% were headed by married couples living together, 15.0% had a female householder with no husband present, and 33.8% were non-families. 25.3% of all households were made up of individuals, and 9.1% were someone living alone who was 65 years of age or older. The average household size was 2.57, and the average family size was 3.01.

24.5% of residents in the CDP were under the age of 18, 9.7% were from age 18 to 24, 26.5% were from 25 to 44, 27.9% were from 45 to 64, and 11.5% were 65 years of age or older. The median age was 37.6 years. For every 100 females, there were 96.7 males. For every 100 females age 18 and over, there were 93.7 males.

For the period 2011–15, the estimated median annual income for a household was $36,136, and the median income for a family was $48,028. The per capita income for the CDP was $24,782. 15.5% of the population and 12.2% of families were below the poverty line, along with 29.3% of people under the age of 18 and 3.0% of people 65 or older.
