= Milton Town House =

Historic church in New Hampshire, United States

- U.S. National Register of Historic Places
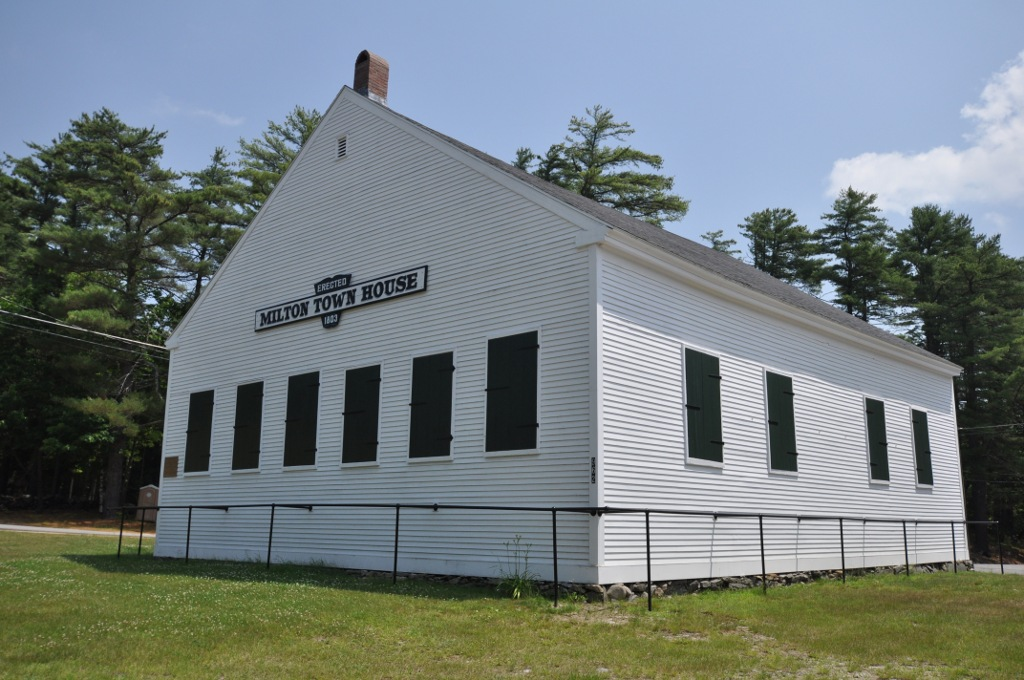

- Location within New Hampshire Location within the United States
- Location: NH 125 and Town House Rd., Milton, New Hampshire
- Coordinates: 43°26′27″N 70°59′5″W
- Area: less than one acre
- Built: 1803
- Built by: Multiple
- NRHP reference No.: 80000311
- Added to NRHP: November 26, 1980

The Milton Town House is a historic civic and religious building at the junction of Town House Road and New Hampshire Route 125 in Milton, New Hampshire. Built in 1803 as a meeting place for civic and religious uses, it has served as Milton's town meeting site since then. It ceased religious functions in 1855, when it was reduced to a single story. The building was listed on the National Register of Historic Places in 1980.

== Description and history ==
The Milton Town House is located in central eastern Milton, in the middle of the triangular junction of Town House Road and New Hampshire Route 125. It is a single-story wood-frame structure, with a gabled roof and clapboarded exterior. There are two entrances on the eastern facade, with flanking windows at a raised elevation, and a central window in the gable above. All of the building's windows have fully operable shutters that are normally closed when the building is not in use. An iron railing, originally intended as a means to tie up horses, extends around the north and west sides. The interior is finished in knotty pine, with a pressed tin ceiling.

The building was originally two full stories, and was built in 1803 (one year after the town was incorporated) to serve as a church and civic meeting space. The town purchased the building in 1855 after the local congregation became divided over religious issues and decided to sell the building. The town reduced it to a single story, and removed its interior religious trappings. The pulpit was reinstalled in 1965, but not at its original location, as a reminder of the building's religious past.

The National Register listing includes a rebuilt copy of the town's original animal pound, a unique circular fieldstone structure which stands across Route 125. It was built in 1804, rebuilt in 1823, and moved and rebuilt when the highway was widened in 1928. It is one of three surviving stone 19th-century pounds in New Hampshire.

== See also ==
- National Register of Historic Places listings in Strafford County, New Hampshire
