= Place, New Hampshire =

Unincorporated community in New Hampshire, United States

- Unincorporated community
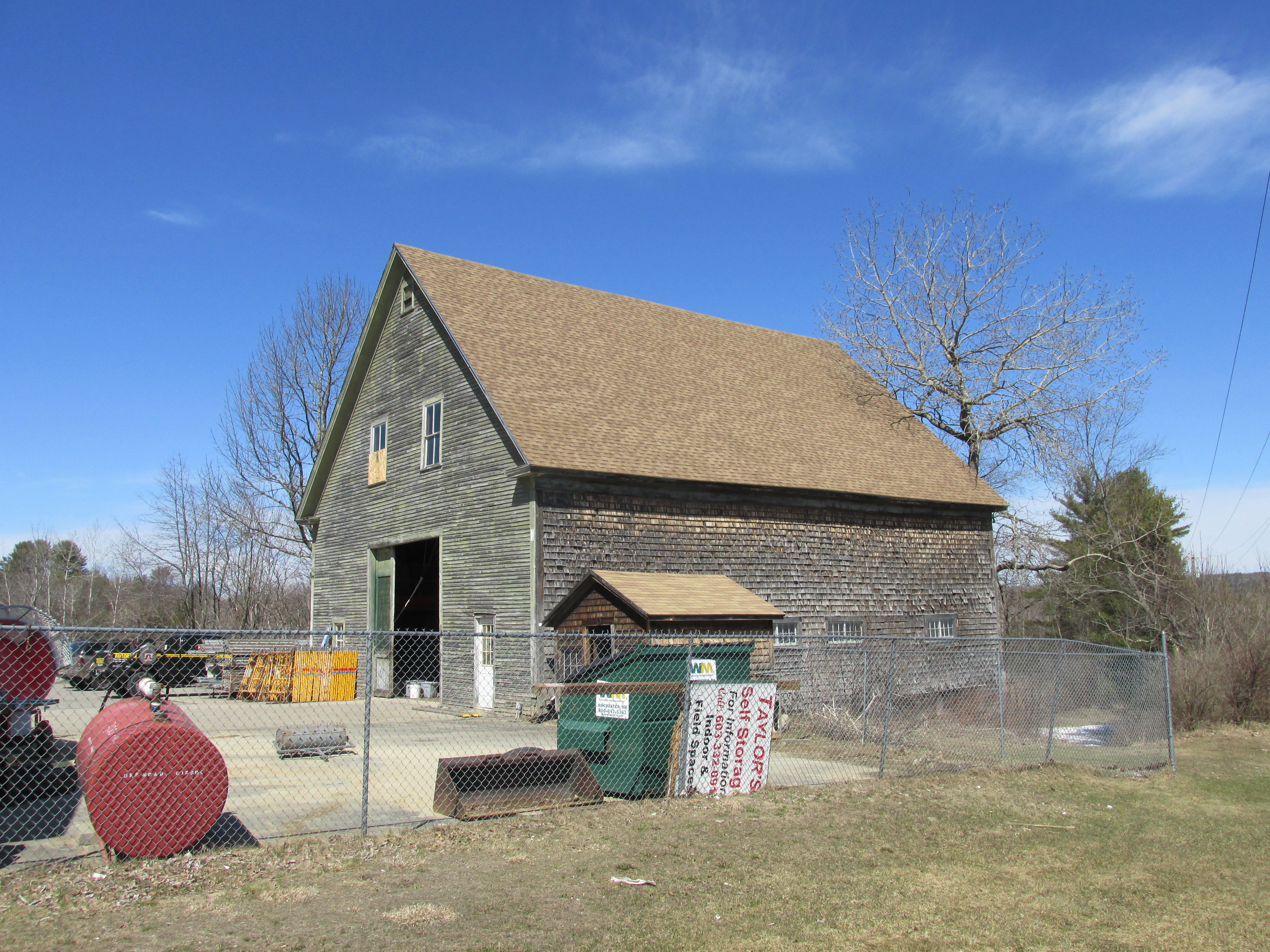
- Barn

- Location within New Hampshire Location within the United States
- Coordinates: 43°21′09″N 71°01′32″W
- Country: United States
- State: New Hampshire
- County: Strafford
- Town: Farmington
- Elevation: 269 ft (82 m)
- Time zone: UTC-5 (Eastern (EST))
  - Summer (DST): UTC-4 (EDT)
- Area code: 603
- GNIS feature ID: 869242

Place is an unincorporated community in the town of Farmington, Strafford County, New Hampshire, United States. Place is located on New Hampshire Route 11, 4.2 miles (6.8 km) northwest of Rochester.
