= Milton (CDP), New Hampshire =

Census-designated place in New Hampshire, United States

Milton, New Hampshire
- Census-designated place
- Location within New Hampshire Location within the United States
- Coordinates: 43°24′34″N 70°59′18″W
- Country: United States
- State: New Hampshire
- County: Strafford
- Town: Milton

Area
  - Total: 0.81 sq mi (2.10 km^{2})
  - Land: 0.81 sq mi (2.09 km^{2})
  - Water: 0 sq mi (0.00 km^{2})
- Elevation: 374 ft (114 m)

Population (2020)
  - Total: 593
  - Density: 733.9/sq mi (283.37/km^{2})
- Time zone: UTC-5 (Eastern (EST))
  - Summer (DST): UTC-4 (EDT)
- ZIP code: 03851
- Area code: 603
- FIPS code: 33-48580
- GNIS feature ID: 2629728

Milton is a census-designated place (CDP) and the primary village in the town of Milton, New Hampshire, United States. The population of the CDP was 593 at the 2020 census, out of 4,482 in the entire town.

== Geography ==
The CDP is in the southeastern part of the town of Milton, on the west side of the Salmon Falls River, which forms the New Hampshire–Maine state line. The CDP extends north (upriver) to the outlet of Milton Pond, and south (downriver) to the head of Spaulding Pond. The western limit of the CDP follows a power line that passes through forested land just west of the village.

New Hampshire Route 125 is the main road through the CDP, leading north 6 miles (10 km) to its terminus at Union and south 7 miles (11 km) to the center of Rochester. New Hampshire Route 75 has its eastern terminus in the southern part of the CDP and leads west 4 miles (6 km) to Farmington. New Hampshire Route 16 (the Spaulding Turnpike) passes just west of the CDP, with access from Exit 17 (Route 75). Route 16 leads north 55 miles (89 km) to North Conway and south 30 miles (48 km) to Portsmouth.

According to the U.S. Census Bureau, the Milton CDP has a total area of 0.81 square miles (2.1 km^{2}), of which 1.09 acres (4,419 m^{2}) are water, comprising 0.21% of the CDP. Via the Salmon Falls River, Milton is part of the Piscataqua River watershed, reaching the Atlantic Ocean at Portsmouth.

== Demographics ==
Historical population
Census	Pop.	Note	%±
2010	575		—
2020	593		3.1%
U.S. Decennial Census

As of the census of 2010, there were 575 people, 226 households, and 148 families residing in the CDP. There were 261 housing units, of which 35, or 13.4%, were vacant. The racial makeup of the CDP was 96.2% white, 0.9% African American, and 3.0% from two or more races. 1.2% of the population were Hispanic or Latino of any race.

Of the 226 households in the CDP, 38.5% had children under the age of 18 living with them, 43.4% were headed by married couples living together, 12.4% had a female householder with no husband present, and 34.5% were non-families. 27.0% of all households were made up of individuals, and 6.2% were someone living alone who was 65 years of age or older. The average household size was 2.54, and the average family size was 3.07.

28.2% of residents in the CDP were under the age of 18, 8.3% were from age 18 to 24, 27.3% were from 25 to 44, 27.5% were from 45 to 64, and 8.7% were 65 years of age or older. The median age was 35.9 years. For every 100 females, there were 109.0 males. For every 100 females age 18 and over, there were 100.5 males.

For the period 2011–15, the estimated median annual income for a household was $50,813, and the median income for a family was $58,281. The per capita income for the CDP was $18,159. 16.7% of the population and 8.1% of families were below the poverty line, along with 14.8% of people under the age of 18 and 0.0% of people 65 or older.
