= Gonic, New Hampshire =

Unincorporated community in New Hampshire, United States

- Unincorporated community
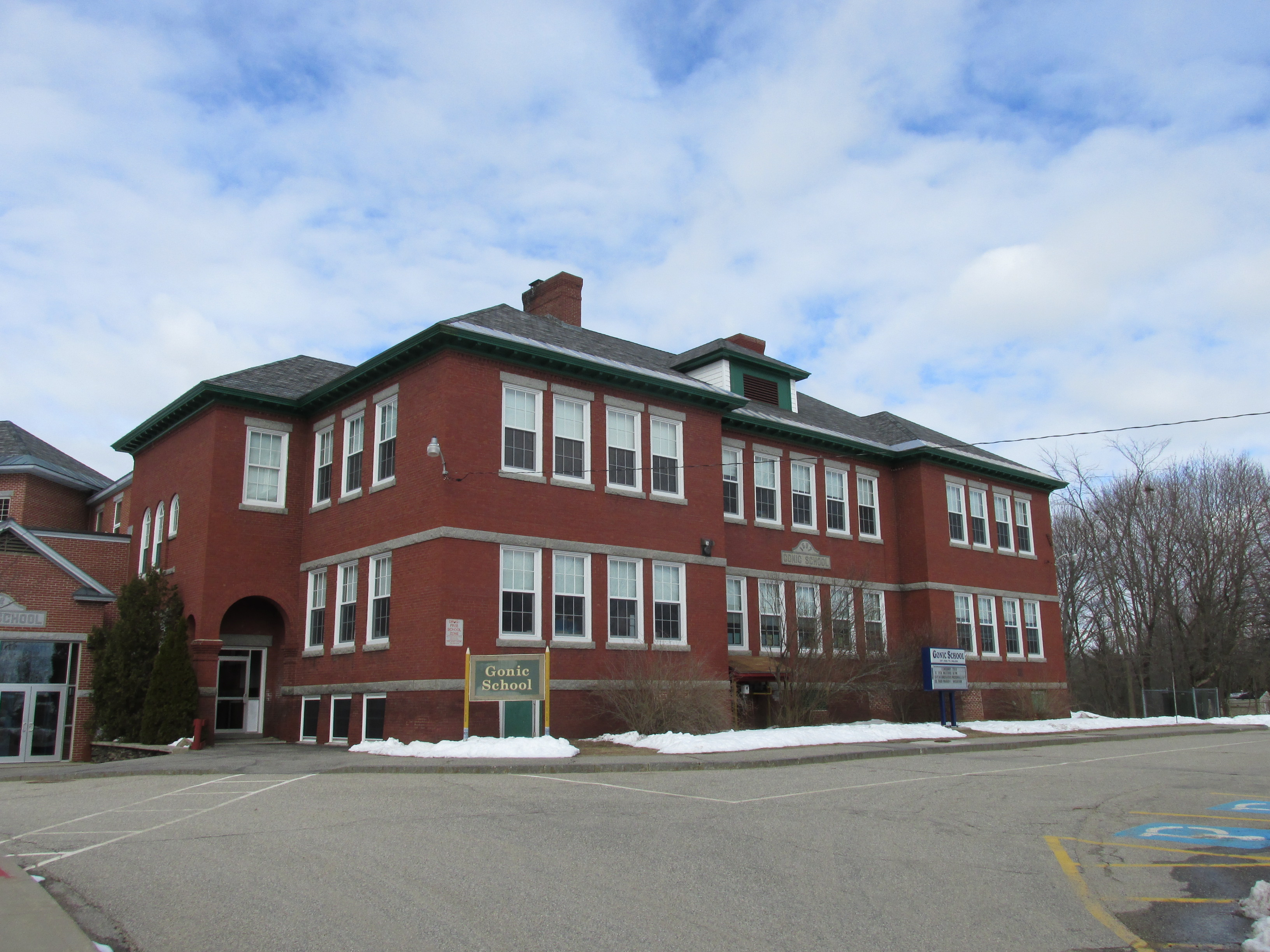
- Gonic School

- Location within New Hampshire Location within the United States
- Coordinates: 43°16′28″N 70°58′41″W
- Country: United States
- State: New Hampshire
- County: Strafford
- City: Rochester
- Elevation: 190 ft (58 m)
- Time zone: UTC-5 (Eastern (EST))
  - Summer (DST): UTC-4 (EDT)
- ZIP code: 03839
- Area code: 603
- GNIS feature ID: 867109

Gonic is a neighborhood in the city of Rochester in Strafford County, New Hampshire, United States. It is located around a dam on the Cocheco River, 2 miles (3 km) south of downtown Rochester. The community is separated from the downtown area of Rochester by New Hampshire Route 16, the Spaulding Turnpike. New Hampshire Route 125 passes to the west of the community, leading south towards East Barrington and the Lee traffic circle.

Gonic has a separate ZIP code (03839) from other parts of Rochester.

== In popular culture ==
- Rod Picott sings of selling scrap metal in Gonic in his song "All the Broken Parts" from the album Hang Your Hopes on a Crooked Nail.
