= Kennebunk Manufacturing Company =

Kennebunk Manufacturing Company

The Kennebunk Manufacturing Company made cases, boxes, valises, grips, and trunks from 1893 to 1906 in Kennebunk, Maine and from 1906 to 1936 in Milton, New Hampshire.

== History ==
Page from KEMACO Lunch Box catalog

The Kennebunk Manufacturing Company (KEMACO) was incorporated in Maine on July 23, 1893 with John R. Littlefield of Boston, Mass., President and J. B. Lara of Kennebunk, Me., Treasurer. The purpose of the Company was the “manufacturing and dealing in cases, boxes, valises, grips, and trunks.” The name, “Kennebunk Manufacturing Company” was the same name as that of an ill fated company that had tried to build a cotton mill at Kennebunk in 1825 and failed by 1828. The new Kennebunk Manufacturing Company merged with another Kennebunk manufacturer of similar travel items known as the Travelet Company after 1895. The merged companies were purchased by J. Spaulding & Sons Company in 1902 and its operations were moved to Milton, New Hampshire where they occupied the old N.B. Thayer & Co, shoe factory until 1936. While in Milton the Kennebunk Manufacturing Company, manufactured megaphones, radio speaker horns and violin cases in addition to its original line of lunch boxes and suit and sample cases.

In 1936 the operations of the Kennebunk Manufacturing Company were integrated with those of Spaulding & Perkins Company and the Spaulding Fibre Materials Handling Division was created at North Rochester, New Hampshire.
