= Union, New Hampshire =

Census-designated place in New Hampshire, United States

- Census-designated place
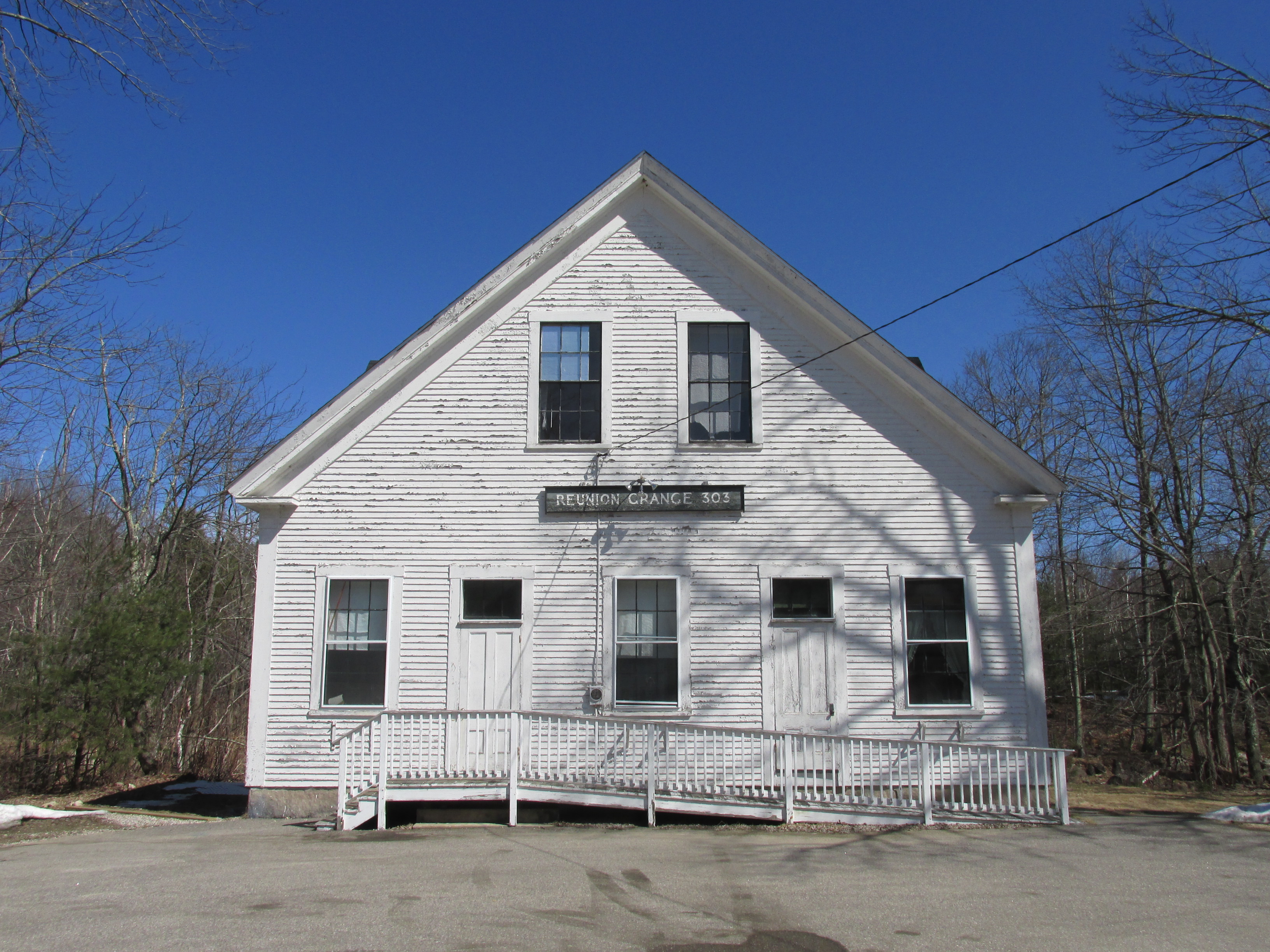
- Reunion Grange 303

- Location within New Hampshire Location within the United States
- Coordinates: 43°29′28″N 71°01′23″W
- Country: United States
- State: New Hampshire
- County: Carroll
- Town: Wakefield

Area
  - Total: 0.31 sq mi (0.81 km^{2})
  - Land: 0.31 sq mi (0.81 km^{2})
  - Water: 0 sq mi (0.00 km^{2})
- Elevation: 482 ft (147 m)

Population (2020)
  - Total: 196
  - Density: 630.6/sq mi (243.47/km^{2})
- Time zone: UTC-5 (Eastern (EST))
  - Summer (DST): UTC-4 (EDT)
- ZIP code: 03887
- Area code: 603
- FIPS code: 33-77780
- GNIS feature ID: 2629743

Union is a village and census-designated place (CDP) in the town of Wakefield, New Hampshire, United States. It had a population of 196 at the 2020 census.

Union has a separate ZIP code (03887) from the rest of the town of Wakefield.

== Geography ==
Union is in the southern corner of the town of Wakefield, along the Branch River, a tributary of the Salmon Falls River. It is bordered to the west by the town of Middleton and to the southeast by the town of Milton, both in Strafford County. New Hampshire Route 16 forms the northeastern edge of the CDP; the highway leads north 16 miles (26 km) to Ossipee and south 15 miles (24 km) to Rochester. New Hampshire Route 153 passes through the northern part of the village, leading north 4.5 miles (7.2 km) to Sanbornville and southwest 8 miles (13 km) to Farmington. New Hampshire Route 125 has its northern terminus in Union at Route 16, and leads southeast 5 miles (8 km) to Milton.

According to the U.S. Census Bureau, the Union CDP has a total area of 0.31 square miles (0.81 km^{2}), all of it recorded as land.

== Demographics ==
Historical population
| Census | Pop. | Note | %± |
|---|---|---|---|
| 2010 | 204 | | — |
| 2020 | 196 | | −3.9% |
U.S. Decennial Census

As of the census of 2010, there were 204 people, 84 households, and 56 families residing in the CDP. There were 93 housing units, of which 9, or 9.7%, were vacant. The racial makeup of the CDP was 98.5% white, 0.5% Native American and 1.0% "some other race". 1.0% of the population were Hispanic or Latino of any race.

Of the 84 households in the CDP, 25.0% had children under the age of 18 living with them, 47.6% were headed by married couples living together, 14.3% had a female householder with no husband present, and 33.3% were non-families. 21.4% of all households were made up of individuals, and 11.9% were someone living alone who was 65 years of age or older. The average household size was 2.43, and the average family size was 2.82.

16.7% of residents in the CDP were under the age of 18, 7.3% were from age 18 to 24, 20.6% were from 25 to 44, 38.7% were from 45 to 64, and 16.7% were 65 years of age or older. The median age was 48.4 years. For every 100 females, there were 98.1 males. For every 100 females age 18 and over, there were 104.8 males.
