= New Hampshire Route 75 =

State highway in Strafford County, New Hampshire, US

New Hampshire Route 75
- Map of Strafford County in southeastern New Hampshire with NH 75 highlighted in red

Route information
- Maintained by NHDOT
- Length: 5.453 mi (8.776 km)

Major junctions
- West end: NH 11 in Farmington
- NH 16 / Spaulding Turnpike in Milton
- East end: NH 125 in Milton

Location
- Country: United States
- State: New Hampshire
- Counties: Strafford

Highway system
- New Hampshire Highway System; Interstate; US; State; Turnpikes
← NH 63	→ NH 77

New Hampshire Route 75 (abbreviated NH 75) is a 5.453-mile-long (8.776 km) secondary east–west highway in Strafford County in southeastern New Hampshire. It runs from Farmington to Milton.

The western terminus of NH 75 is in Farmington at New Hampshire Route 11. The eastern terminus is in Milton at New Hampshire Route 125 just east of the Spaulding Turnpike.

== Junction list ==
The entire route is in Strafford County.

Location	mi	km	Destinations	Notes
Farmington	0.000	0.000	NH 11 (Henry Wilson Highway) – Rochester, New Durham	Western terminus
Farmington	0.674	1.085	NH 153 north (Main Street) – Middleton	Western end of NH 153 concurrency
Farmington	0.864	1.390	NH 153 south (Main Street) – Rochester	Eastern end of NH 153 concurrency
Milton	4.446– 4.689	7.155– 7.546	NH 16 / Spaulding Turnpike – Rochester, Conway	Exit 17 on Spaulding Turnpike
Milton	5.453	8.776	NH 125 (White Mountain Highway) – Rochester, Milton, Wakefield	Eastern terminus
1.000 mi = 1.609 km; 1.000 km = 0.621 mi: Concurrency terminus
