= Milton Mills, New Hampshire =

Census-designated place in New Hampshire, United States

- Census-designated place
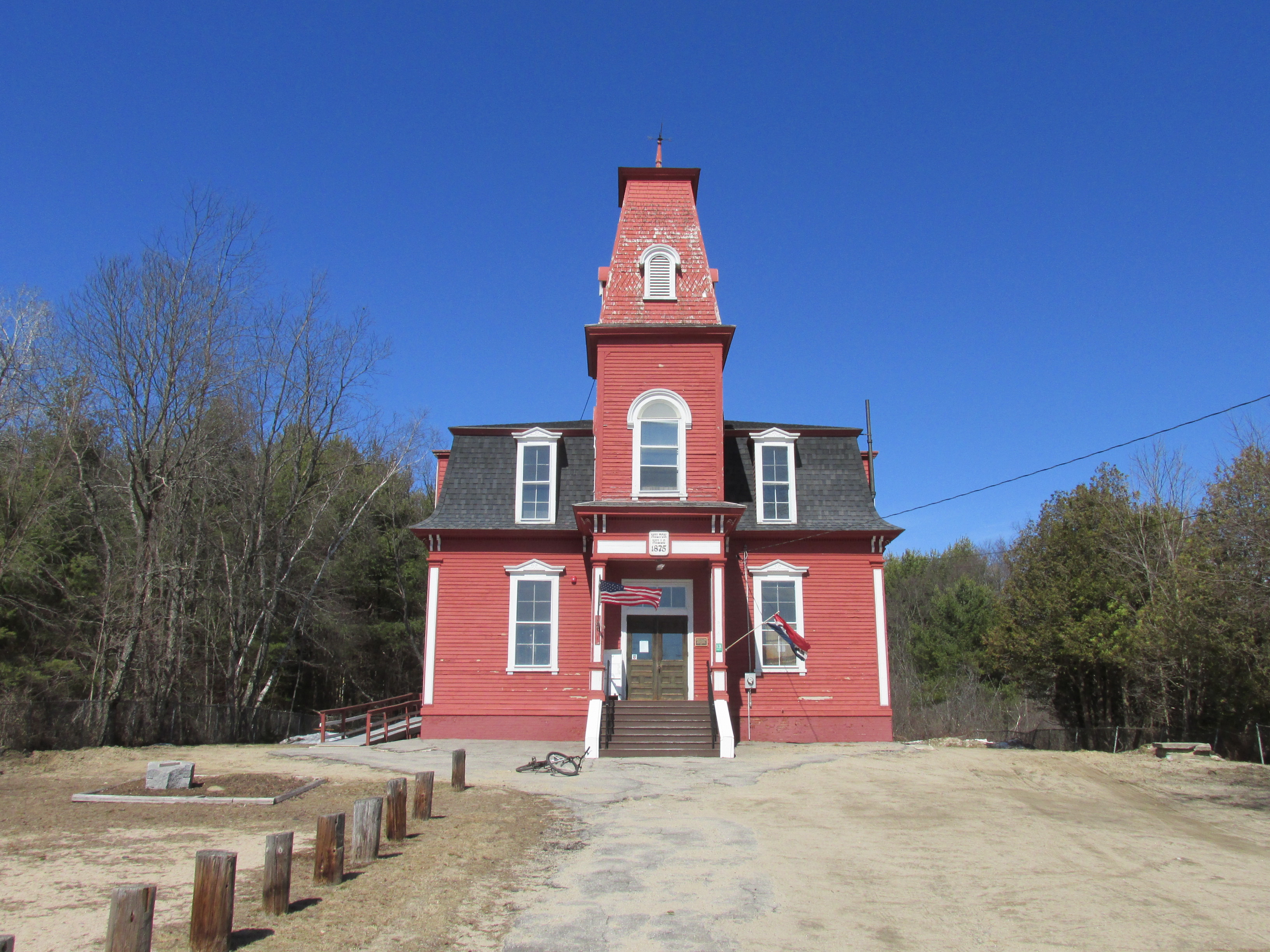
- Milton Free Public Library, listed on the New Hampshire State Register of Historic Places

- Location within New Hampshire Location within the United States
- Coordinates: 43°30′02″N 70°57′58″W
- Country: United States
- State: New Hampshire
- County: Strafford
- Town: Milton

Area
  - Total: 0.87 sq mi (2.25 km^{2})
  - Land: 0.86 sq mi (2.23 km^{2})
  - Water: 0.0077 sq mi (0.02 km^{2})
- Elevation: 492 ft (150 m)

Population (2020)
  - Total: 313
  - Density: 363.2/sq mi (140.25/km^{2})
- Time zone: UTC-5 (Eastern (EST))
  - Summer (DST): UTC-4 (EDT)
- ZIP code: 03852
- Area code: 603
- FIPS code: 33-48740
- GNIS feature ID: 2629729

Milton Mills is a small village and census-designated place in the town of Milton, New Hampshire, United States. It had a population of 313 at the 2020 census. Milton Mills has a separate ZIP code (03852) from the rest of the town of Milton.

== Geography ==
The village is located in the northern part of the town of Milton, adjacent to the Salmon Falls River, which forms the border between New Hampshire and Maine. Applebee Road leads southwest to New Hampshire Route 125 and the center of Milton, Willey Road leads northwest to Wakefield, Milton Mills Road leads east to Maine State Route 109 in Acton, Maine, and Foxes Ridge Road leads southeast to Lebanon, Maine, and U.S. Route 202.

According to the U.S. Census Bureau, the Milton Mills CDP has a total area of 0.8 square miles (2.2 km^{2}), of which 0.01 square miles (0.02 km^{2}), or 0.76%, are water. Via the Salmon Falls River, the community is part of the Piscataqua River watershed.

== Demographics ==
Historical population
Census	Pop.	Note	%±
2010	299		—
2020	313		4.7%
U.S. Decennial Census

As of the census of 2010, there were 299 people, 111 households, and 85 families residing in the CDP. There were 127 housing units, of which 16, or 12.6%, were vacant. The racial makeup of the CDP was 99.0% white and 1.0% from two or more races. None of the population were Hispanic or Latino of any race.

Of the 226 households in the CDP, 38.7% had children under the age of 18 living with them, 60.4% were headed by married couples living together, 13.5% had a female householder with no husband present, and 23.4% were non-families. 18.9% of all households were made up of individuals, and 6.3% were someone living alone who was 65 years of age or older. The average household size was 2.69, and the average family size was 3.05.

26.4% of residents in the CDP were under the age of 18, 8.2% were from age 18 to 24, 22.4% were from 25 to 44, 31.1% were from 45 to 64, and 12.0% were 65 years of age or older. The median age was 40.4 years. For every 100 females, there were 74.9 males. For every 100 females age 18 and over, there were 80.3 males.
