= New Hampshire Route 125 =

State highway in southeastern New Hampshire, US

New Hampshire Route 125
- Map of southeastern New Hampshire with NH 125 highlighted in red

Route information
- Maintained by NHDOT
- Length: 51.994 mi (83.676 km)

Major junctions
- South end: Route 125 at the Massachusetts state line in Plaistow
- NH 101 in Epping; US 4 in Lee; NH 16 / Spaulding Turnpike in Rochester and Milton; US 202 / NH 11 in Rochester
- North end: NH 16 / NH 153 in Wakefield

Location
- Country: United States
- State: New Hampshire
- Counties: Rockingham, Strafford, Carroll

Highway system
- New Hampshire Highway System; Interstate; US; State; Turnpikes
← NH 124	→ NH 126

New Hampshire Route 125 is a 51.994-mile-long (83.676 km) north–south state highway in Rockingham, Strafford and Carroll counties in southeastern New Hampshire. The southern terminus is in Plaistow at the Massachusetts state line, where the road continues south into Haverhill as Massachusetts Route 125. The northern terminus is in Wakefield at New Hampshire Route 16 and New Hampshire Route 153.

Although NH 125 is mostly an undivided two-lane highway, it regularly carries heavy truck and tourist traffic, especially in the summer months, when it is used as a toll-free alternative to Interstate 95 and the Spaulding Turnpike.

The Epping–Lee–Barrington section is known as the Calef Highway, named after state senator Austin L. Calef and family who owned the locally famous Calef's Country Store in Barrington for more than a century. The Milton section is the southernmost part of the White Mountain Highway. The Brentwood section is officially named the Officer Stephen Arkell Memorial Highway, named for a police officer of that community who was killed in the line of duty.

== History ==
The section of NH 125 between Epping and East Barrington (the intersection with NH 9) was built on the grade of the Boston and Maine Railroad Worcester, Nashua and Portland Division, opened by the Nashua and Rochester Railroad in 1876.

Calef's County Store, a locally famous shop in Barrington, is located near the intersection of NH 125 and NH 9. Founded in 1869 and operated by five generations of the Calef family until the mid-1990s, the store remains a popular destination.

The northern section of NH 125 between downtown Rochester and Wakefield occupies part of the original alignment of NH 16 (first designated as New England Interstate Route 16). The historic northern terminus of NH 125 was at the intersection of Columbus Avenue and South Main Street in downtown Rochester. When NH 16 was moved onto the Spaulding Turnpike in the early 1990s, the northern part of its old alignment in Rochester, as well as its entire alignment through Milton and into Wakefield, was redesignated as NH 125, extending NH 125 by over 16 miles (26 km).

== Route description ==
=== Plaistow, Kingston, Brentwood ===
The NH 125 designation begins on Plaistow Road where Massachusetts Route 125 crosses the state line from Haverhill, Massachusetts, into Plaistow, New Hampshire. NH 121A also begins here and splits off as Main Street towards downtown Plaistow. NH 125 stays to the west of town and is initially a four-lane divided highway serving as the local shopping strip. After bypassing the downtown area, NH 125 crosses over NH 121A, then turns northeast and transitions into an undivided two-lane rural highway before crossing into the town of Kingston. In Kingston, NH 125 is first joined by NH 111 which approaches from the west, then 1.6 miles (2.6 km) later by NH 107 which approaches from the east. Bypassing east of downtown Kingston, the three routes are overlapped for just over 1 mile (1.6 km) before NH 111 turns east towards Exeter. NH 107 and NH 125 continue northwest for another 1/2 mile (0.80 km), then NH 107 turns off towards Fremont while NH 125 continues north and crosses into the town of Brentwood. The highway has one major junction in Brentwood with NH 111A (the main road in town) and continues north towards Epping.

=== Epping, Lee, Barrington (Calef Highway) ===
Upon crossing into Epping, NH 125 becomes known as the Calef Highway and expands to four lanes before interchanging with the NH 101 freeway at exit 7. The highway turns northeast to bypass downtown and crosses NH 27 and the Lamprey River, narrowing back to two lanes thereafter. NH 125 meets the western terminus of NH 87 and the southern terminus of NH 155 before turning due north and entering Lee. NH 125 crosses NH 152 and turns slightly east, bypassing downtown Lee (which is directly served by NH 155) to the west. Continuing north, NH 125 then intersects with U.S. Route 4 at the Lee Traffic Circle, a major two-lane roundabout. NH 125 enters Barrington and stays along the town's east side, crossing the Bellamy River and then NH 9 further north. The highway continues north and enters the Rochester city limits.

=== Rochester ===
The Calef Highway moniker ends as NH 125 enters Rochester, and the road becomes known as Gonic Road (after the neighborhood of Gonic which NH 125 passes through). The highway crosses the Isinglass River and passes alongside the Rochester County Club as it continues north towards downtown Rochester. After passing through Gonic, NH 125 has a major interchange with the Spaulding Turnpike (NH 16) at exit 12, and the road becomes Columbus Avenue as it transitions into an urban route. The highway crosses the Cocheco River and crosses South Main Street (which carries NH 108 and NH 202A, both of which terminate here) just south of downtown. While NH 202A heads straight into the heart of town, NH 125 follows Columbus Avenue in a partial loop around the east side of downtown. On the north side of downtown, Columbus Avenue ends and NH 125 turns north onto Wakefield Street, which becomes Milton Road. NH 125 has an interchange with US 202 and NH 11, which provide access to the nearby Spaulding Turnpike at exit 16, as well as to points east in Maine. As NH 125 continues north, it begins to parallel the Salmon Falls River (which forms the border between New Hampshire and Maine) to the west, and the Spaulding Turnpike to the east. The highway transitions back into a rural route as it enters the town of Milton.

=== Milton, Wakefield ===
Upon crossing into Milton, NH 125 becomes known as the White Mountain Highway, in recognition of its former status as the major route north to the White Mountains Region (it carried the original alignment of NH 16 before the Spaulding Turnpike was built). The highway meets the eastern terminus of NH 75, which connects to the nearby turnpike at exit 17, before passing through downtown Milton, continuing to run along the western side of the Salmon Falls River. After leaving the downtown area, NH 125 turns slightly westward away from the river and continues winding north, running nearly adjacent to the turnpike. As it approaches the Branch River, a tributary of the Salmon Falls, NH 125 turns west and interchanges with the Spaulding Turnpike again at exit 18. This interchange marks the northern terminus of the Spaulding Turnpike, and the White Mountain Highway designation continues northward on NH 16. NH 125 crosses into Wakefield and passes through the village of Union as Main Street, then intersects with NH 153. NH 125 is overlapped with NH 153 on Main Street for 0.29 miles (0.47 km) (although this is only signed in the southbound direction) as the road bends around to the east to meet NH 16, where the NH 125 designation officially ends. The roadway continues north as NH 153 (Wakefield Road).

== Junction list ==
County	Location	mi	km	Destinations	Notes
Rockingham	Plaistow	0.000	0.000	Route 125 south (Plaistow Road) – Haverhill	Continuation into Massachusetts
Rockingham	Plaistow	0.035	0.056	NH 121A north (Main Street) – Plaistow Village	Southern terminus of NH 121A
Rockingham	Plaistow	2.324	3.740	NH 121A (Main Street) – Plaistow, East Hampstead	
Rockingham	Kingston	7.406	11.919	NH 111 west (Danville Road) – Salem, Nashua	Southern end of NH 111 concurrency
Rockingham	Kingston	9.127	14.688	NH 107 south (Depot Road) to NH 107A – East Kingston	Southern end of NH 107 concurrency
Rockingham	Kingston	10.170	16.367	NH 111 east (Exeter Road) – Exeter	Northern end of NH 111 concurrency
Rockingham	Kingston	10.701	17.222	NH 107 north (Marshall Road) – Fremont, Raymond	Northern end of NH 107 concurrency
Rockingham	Brentwood	12.960	20.857	NH 111A (Middle Road) – Fremont, Exeter	
Rockingham	Epping	16.389– 16.524	26.376– 26.593	NH 101 – Exeter, Hampton, Raymond, Manchester	Exit 7 on NH 101
Rockingham	Epping	17.188	27.661	NH 27 (Water Street / Exeter Road) – Epping	
Rockingham	Epping	18.899	30.415	NH 87 east (Hedding Road) – Hedding, Newfields	Western terminus of NH 87
Rockingham	Epping	20.724	33.352	NH 155 (Lee Hill Road) – Lee, Durham	Southern terminus of NH 155
Strafford	Lee	22.001	35.407	NH 152 (Harvey Mill Road / Wadleigh Falls Road) – Nottingham, Newmarket	
Strafford	Lee	26.086	41.981	US 4 (Concord Road) – Durham, Dover, Portsmouth, Northwood, Concord	Lee Traffic Circle
Strafford	Barrington	30.571	49.199	NH 9 (Franklin Pierce Highway / Littleworth Road) – Concord, Dover	
Strafford	Rochester	35.510– 35.747	57.148– 57.529	NH 16 / Spaulding Turnpike – Dover, Portsmouth, Boston, Alton, Ossipee, Sanford, ME	Exit 12 on Spaulding Turnpike
Strafford	Rochester	36.971	59.499	NH 108 south / NH 202A west (South Main Street)	Northern terminus of NH 108; eastern terminus of NH 202A
Strafford	Rochester	39.142– 39.446	62.993– 63.482	US 202 / NH 11 (Highland Street) to NH 16 / Spaulding Turnpike – Concord, Alton, East Rochester, Sanford, ME, Conway, Portsmouth	Interchange
Strafford	Milton	43.785	70.465	NH 75 west (Farmington Road) to NH 16 / Spaulding Turnpike – Farmington, Portsmouth, Conway	Eastern terminus of NH 75
Strafford	Milton	50.044– 50.279	80.538– 80.916	NH 16 / Spaulding Turnpike south – Rochester, Portsmouth, Ossipee, Conway	Exit 18 on Spaulding Turnpike
Carroll	Wakefield	51.708	83.216	NH 153 south (Middleton Hill Road) – Middleton, Farmington	Southern end of NH 153 concurrency
Carroll	Wakefield	51.994	83.676	NH 16 (White Mountain Highway) / NH 153 north (Wakefield Road) – Ossipee, Rochester, Sanbornville	Northern terminus; northern end of NH 153 concurrency
1.000 mi = 1.609 km; 1.000 km = 0.621 mi: Concurrency terminus
