= Milton Pond =

Lake in the United States

- Depot Pond
- Location within Maine Location within New Hampshire Location within the United States
- Location: Strafford County, New Hampshire; York County, Maine
- Coordinates: 43°25′17″N 70°58′46″W
- Primary inflows: Salmon Falls River
- Primary outflows: Salmon Falls River
- Catchment area: 107 sq mi (280 km^{2})
- Basin countries: United States
- Max. length: 2.0 mi (3.2 km)
- Max. width: 1.0 mi (1.6 km)
- Surface area: 271 acres (1.10 km^{2})
- Average depth: 18 ft (5.5 m)
- Max. depth: 52 ft (16 m)
- Water volume: 3,629 acre⋅ft (4,476,000 m^{3})
- Residence time: 11.1 days
- Shore length^{1}: 7.8 mi (12.6 km)
- Surface elevation: 413 ft (126 m)
- Settlements: Milton, New Hampshire; Lebanon, Maine
- ^{1} Shore length is not a well-defined measure.

Milton Pond, also known as Depot Pond, is a 271-acre (1.10 km^{2}) water body located along the border between Strafford County, New Hampshire, and York County, Maine, in the northeastern United States. The lake lies in the towns of Milton, New Hampshire, and Lebanon, Maine. It connects with Northeast Pond to the northeast, and with Town House Pond to the north. A dam at the outlet of Milton Pond controls the water level for all three lakes, known collectively as "Milton Three Ponds". Below the dam, the Salmon Falls River flows southeast along the Maine-New Hampshire border until it reaches the Piscataqua River.

The lake is classified as a cold- and warmwater fishery, with observed species including rainbow trout, brown trout, smallmouth and largemouth bass, chain pickerel, horned pout, white perch, and black crappie.

== See also ==
- List of lakes in Maine
- List of lakes in New Hampshire
