= Laconia Municipal Airport =

- IATA: LCI; ICAO: KLCI; FAA LID: LCI

Summary
- Airport type: Public
- Operator: City of Laconia
- Location: Gilford, New Hampshire
- Elevation AMSL: 545 ft (166 m)
- Coordinates: 43°34′22″N 71°25′08″W
- Website: www.laconiaairport.com

Map
- Interactive map of Laconia Municipal Airport

Runways
Direction	Length		Surface
Direction	ft	m	Surface
8/26	5,890	1,795	Asphalt

Laconia Municipal Airport (IATA: LCI, ICAO: KLCI, FAA LID: LCI) is a general aviation airport located three miles (5 km) northeast of the central business district (CBD) of Laconia, a city in Belknap County, New Hampshire, USA. It covers 502 acres (203 ha) and has one runway. It is included in the Federal Aviation Administration (FAA) National Plan of Integrated Airport Systems for 2017–2021, in which it is categorized as a regional general aviation facility.

Though it no longer supports a passenger airline, Laconia was once served by Northeast Express Regional Airlines. Northeast Express utilized an EAS (Essential Air Service) subsidy. Airline service was later provided by Skymaster Airlines, owned by Luke Smith. Smith transformed the service from piston prop Cessna 421-type planes to 15-passenger turbine Beech 99s. Skymaster expanded service from two cities (Laconia and Boston) to five, adding Keene, New Hampshire, Rutland, Vermont, and Newark, New Jersey. Skymaster was sold to three individuals who formed Atlantic North Airlines.

Laconia Airport sees frequent private jet travel, mainly because of its proximity to the wealthy Lake Winnipesaukee region, the Meadowbrook (Bank of New Hampshire) Pavilion, and New Hampshire Motor Speedway. KLCI has two primary fixed base operators (FBOs), Emerson Aviation and Sky Bright.

== See also ==
- List of airports in New Hampshire
