= East Rochester, New Hampshire =

Unincorporated community in New Hampshire, United States

- Unincorporated community
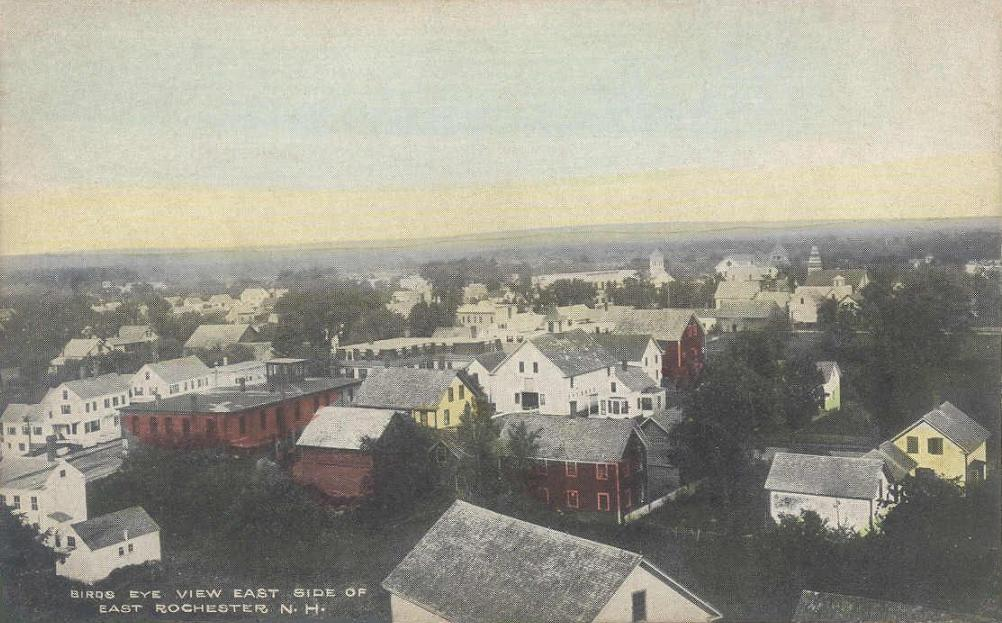
- Bird's-eye view c. 1905

- Location within New Hampshire Location within the United States
- Coordinates: 43°19′59″N 70°56′29″W
- Country: United States
- State: New Hampshire
- County: Strafford
- City: Rochester
- Elevation: 230 ft (70 m)
- Time zone: UTC-5 (Eastern (EST))
  - Summer (DST): UTC-4 (EDT)
- ZIP code: 03868
- Area code: 603
- GNIS feature ID: 866724

East Rochester is a neighborhood within the city of Rochester, New Hampshire, United States, located on the banks of the Salmon Falls River which separates Maine from New Hampshire. Home to approximately 3,600 residents, the community is located 3 miles (5 km) east of Rochester proper, and is one of two villages (the other being Gonic) within city limits.

== History ==
The area was a farming community which developed into a small textile and shoe manufacturing mill town during the Industrial Revolution. The Abenaki people called the area's river Newichawannock, meaning "river with many falls", which in the 19th century became the source of water power for two mills. The first was called the Cocheco Woolen Manufacturing Company, with the second smaller one built upstream and called the White Mill. Between the 1880s and 1920s, "Eastside" (as it is referred to by locals) achieved its maximum growth. It was served by the Nashua & Rochester Railroad, which later became part of the Boston & Maine Railroad. Called "Rindgemere", the depot was located on Autumn Street. But during the Great Depression, the mills began to decline, and finally folded in the 1970s. With its principal employers gone, East Rochester slipped in its quality of life. More recently, however, the district has enjoyed a rebirth. Located near major routes and industrial centers, its small village ambience has attracted new residents, and several beautiful Victorian buildings have been restored. East Rochester gets a good percentage of local business from just across the border in Lebanon, Maine.

== Geography ==
East Rochester consists of a main street (U.S. Route 202 and New Hampshire Route 11) with several small shops and a shopping center known as Shoreyville Plaza, named after the original settlement in the area. Portland Street crosses Routes 202 and 11 at the center of East Rochester; on it are two churches and a small library. In recent years, the old fire station (1902 till the early 1980s) has been converted into a museum, as fire services are now obtained from the main station in Rochester. A three-story block located on Portland Street once housed the post office and a clothing store until the early 1980s, when the post office moved into a two-story brick block further north on Portland Street. The area no longer has its post office, but East Rochester still has its own ZIP code (03868).
