= Milton, New Hampshire =

- Town
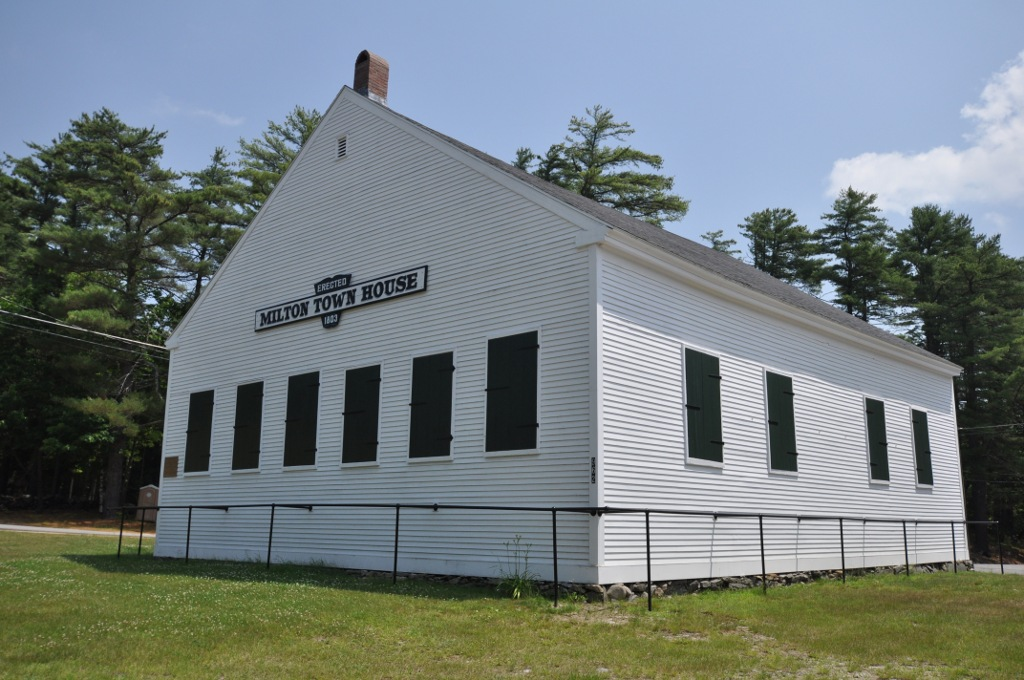
- Milton Town House

- Seal

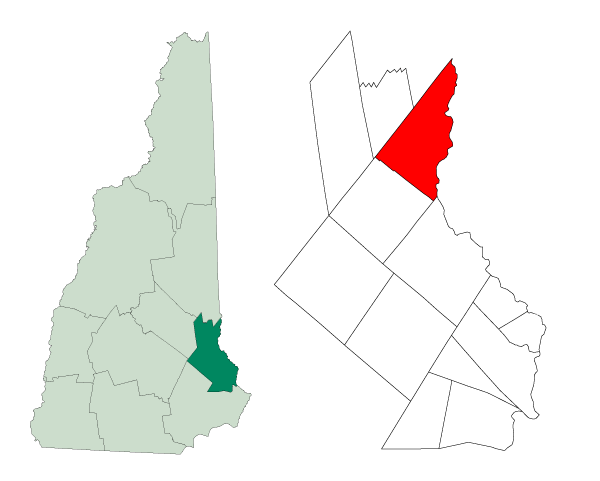
- Location in Strafford County, New Hampshire
- Coordinates: 43°26′58″N 71°0′27″W
- Country: United States
- State: New Hampshire
- County: Strafford
- Incorporated: 1802
- Communities: Milton; Milton Mills; Laskey Corner

Area
  - Total: 34.3 sq mi (88.8 km^{2})
  - Land: 33.1 sq mi (85.6 km^{2})
  - Water: 1.2 sq mi (3.2 km^{2})
- Elevation: 883 ft (269 m)

Population (2020)
  - Total: 4,482
  - Density: 136/sq mi (52.4/km^{2})
- Time zone: UTC-5 (Eastern)
  - Summer (DST): UTC-4 (Eastern)
- ZIP codes: 03851 (Milton); 03852 (Milton Mills)
- Area code: 603
- FIPS code: 33-48660
- GNIS feature ID: 873668
- Website: www.miltonnh-us.com

Milton is a town in Strafford County, New Hampshire, United States. The population was 4,482 at the 2020 census. A manufacturing, resort and residential town, Milton includes the village of Milton Mills. The primary village in town, where 593 people resided at the 2020 census, is defined as the Milton census-designated place (CDP), and is located along New Hampshire Route 125 and the Salmon Falls River, just north of Route 75.

== History ==
Kennebunk Manufacturing Company Fibre Lunch Box Catalog cover

Originally a part of Rochester variously called the "Northeast Parish", "Three Ponds" or "Milton Mills", the town was settled in 1760. It was set off and incorporated in 1802 as "Milton", the name either a contraction of "mill town", or else derived from a relative of the Wentworth colonial governors—William Fitzwilliam, Earl Fitzwilliam and Viscount Milton. The town of Fitzwilliam also bears his name.

The high concentration of water-powered industries in Milton caused Ira W. Jones to found and operate an engineering firm from offices on Main Street in Milton. The company did business as I W Jones Engineers.

In 1893 Jonas Spaulding opened a leatherboard mill in Milton, organizing the business as J. Spaulding and Sons. His sons were Leon C., Huntley N. and Rolland H., of whom Huntley and Rolland would serve as governors of New Hampshire. Jonas and his sons would undertake the construction of another leatherboard mill in North Rochester around 1900. Jonas died before the North Rochester mill became operational. The brothers continued to run the business successfully and brought the Spaulding Brothers leatherboard mill in Townsend Harbor, Massachusetts, under the J. Spaulding and Sons banner in 1902. They were successful with a machine to manufacture shoe counters and with experiments to make vulcanized fiber. In 1912 they opened a purpose-built facility to make vulcanized fiber in Tonawanda, New York. In 1913 J. Spaulding and Sons opened a second leatherboard mill in Milton. They also acquired the Kennebunk Manufacturing Company (KEMACO), which made lunch boxes and violin cases using leatherboard and vulcanized fiber and at one time had facilities in Milton as well.

The town contains some distinctive architecture, particularly the Milton Town House, built in 1808, and the Milton Free Public Library, a Second Empire former schoolhouse built at Milton Mills in 1875.

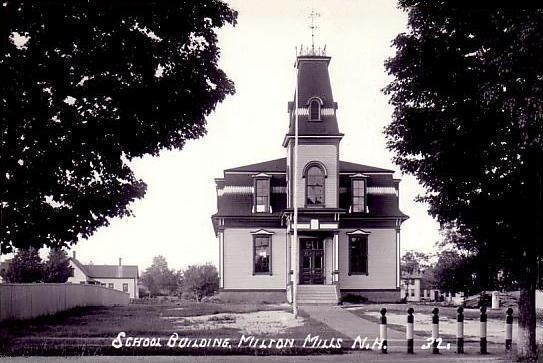
Free Public Library c. 1910

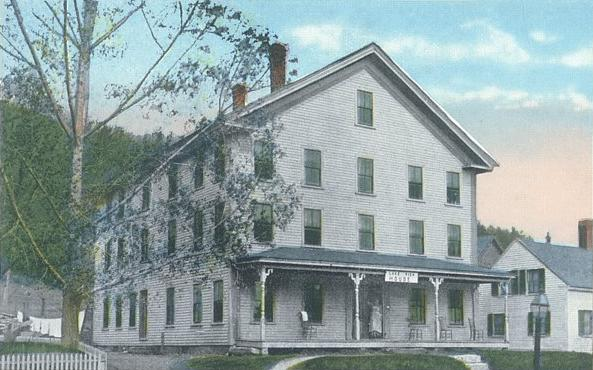
Lake View House c. 1915

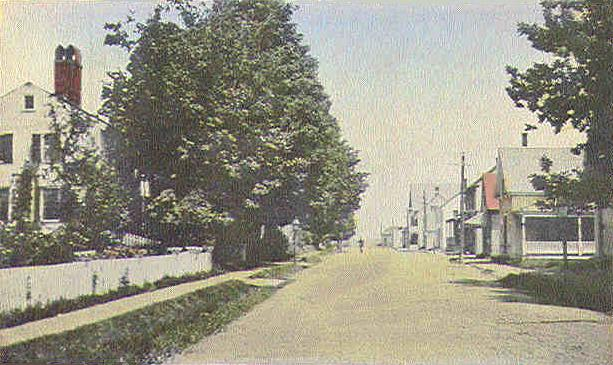
Street scene c. 1910

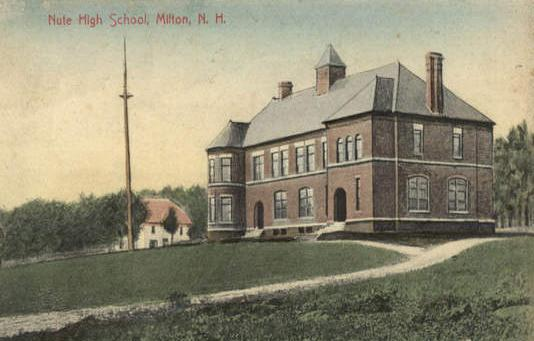
Nute High School in 1907

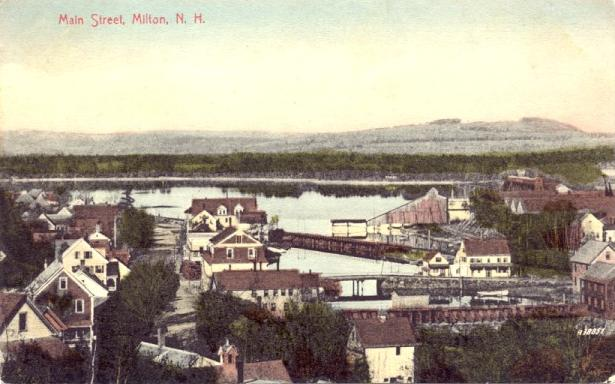
Main Street c. 1910

== Geography ==
The main village of Milton is in the southern part of the town, along the west side of the Salmon Falls River at the outlet of Milton Pond. The village of Milton Mills is in the northern part of the town, 7 miles (11 km) by road north of Milton village.

The Spaulding Turnpike (New Hampshire Route 16) runs north to south through Milton, with access from Exit 17 (New Hampshire Route 75) in the south, near Milton village, and from Exit 18 (New Hampshire Route 125) in the north, just south of the Wakefield town line.

According to the United States Census Bureau, the town has a total area of 34.3 square miles (88.8 km^{2}), of which 33.1 square miles (85.6 km^{2}) are land and 1.2 square miles (3.2 km^{2}) are water, comprising 3.57% of the town. Milton is drained by the Salmon Falls River, which forms the eastern boundary of the town and the New Hampshire–Maine state line. The town is part of the Piscataqua River watershed. Teneriffe Mountain is the highest point in Milton, with the summit reaching 1,090 feet (330 m) above sea level.

=== Adjacent municipalities ===
- Wakefield (north)
- Acton, Maine (northeast)
- Lebanon, Maine (east)
- Rochester (south)
- Farmington (southwest)
- Middleton (northwest)

== Demographics ==
Historical population
Census	Pop.	Note	%±
1810	1,005		—
1820	1,232		22.6%
1830	1,273		3.3%
1840	1,322		3.8%
1850	1,629		23.2%
1860	1,862		14.3%
1870	1,598		−14.2%
1880	1,516		−5.1%
1890	1,640		8.2%
1900	1,625		−0.9%
1910	1,542		−5.1%
1920	1,428		−7.4%
1930	1,206		−15.5%
1940	1,279		6.1%
1950	1,510		18.1%
1960	1,418		−6.1%
1970	1,859		31.1%
1980	2,438		31.1%
1990	3,691		51.4%
2000	3,910		5.9%
2010	4,598		17.6%
2020	4,482		−2.5%
U.S. Decennial Census

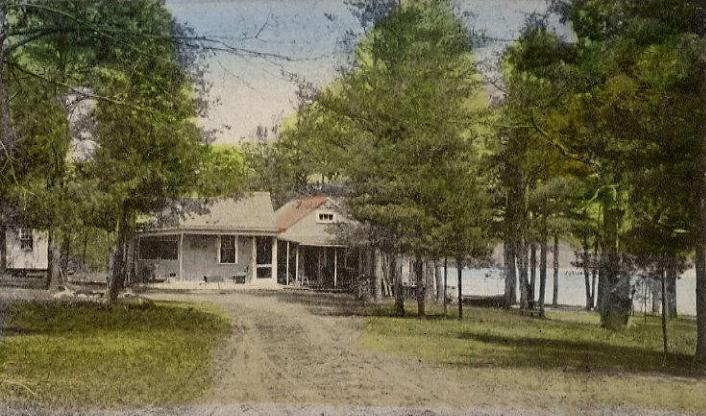
"The Camps" in 1910

As of the census of 2010, there were 4,598 people, 1,800 households, and 1,283 families residing in the town. There were 2,181 housing units, of which 381, or 17.5%, were vacant. 225 of the vacant units were for seasonal or recreational use. The racial makeup of the town was 97.4% white, 0.5% African American, 0.2% Native American, 0.2% Asian, 0.02% Native Hawaiian or Pacific Islander, 0.2% some other race, and 1.5% from two or more races. 0.9% of the population were Hispanic or Latino of any race.

Of the 1,800 households, 32.7% had children under the age of 18 living with them, 56.3% were headed by married couples living together, 9.6% had a female householder with no husband present, and 28.7% were non-families. 21.3% of all households were made up of individuals, and 5.8% were someone living alone who was 65 years of age or older. The average household size was 2.55, and the average family size was 2.93.

In the town, 22.9% of the population were under the age of 18, 7.3% were from 18 to 24, 25.4% from 25 to 44, 33.0% from 45 to 64, and 11.4% were 65 years of age or older. The median age was 41.3 years. For every 100 females, there were 96.9 males. For every 100 females age 18 and over, there were 96.9 males.

For the period 2011–2015, the estimated median annual income for a household was $60,000, and the median income for a family was $67,991. Male full-time workers had a median income of $55,324 versus $34,832 for females. The per capita income for the town was $33,495. 8.8% of the population and 4.6% of families were below the poverty line. 8.5% of the population under the age of 18 and 3.6% of those 65 or older were living in poverty.

== Sites of interest ==
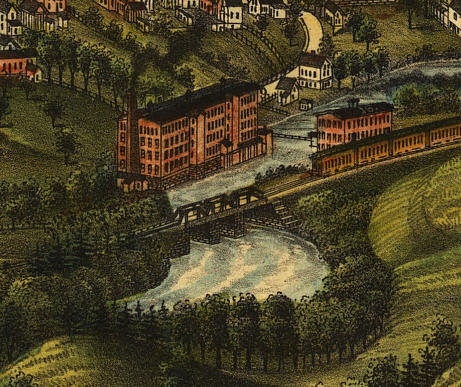
Mill and train in 1888

- New Hampshire Farm Museum
- The Milton Free Public Library (MFPL) in Milton Mills is housed in a building that was constructed in 1875 as a school house, and continued in this role until 1991, when its elementary grade students were bused daily down to Milton. It was the following year—1992—that MFPL relocated from smaller premises on Jug Hill Road to its current location. Before that the library was located at the current historical society, which was built in 1916 with the purpose of becoming a library. The land was donated by John E. Towsend, and did not become part of the town until September 26, 1921. The very first librarian that worked at this location was John Simes, and the first group of trustees were John E. Horne, Everett Fox, and Moses G. Chamberlain.

== Notable people ==
- Louise Bogan (1897–1970), Poet Laureate to the Library of Congress (1945)
- Robert Edmond Jones (1887–1954), theatrical designer
- Alonzo Nute (1826–1892), US congressman
- Richard Olney II (1871–1939), US congressman from Massachusetts
- Michael Stonebraker (born 1943), computer scientist
