= Strafford County, New Hampshire =

County in New Hampshire, United States

- County
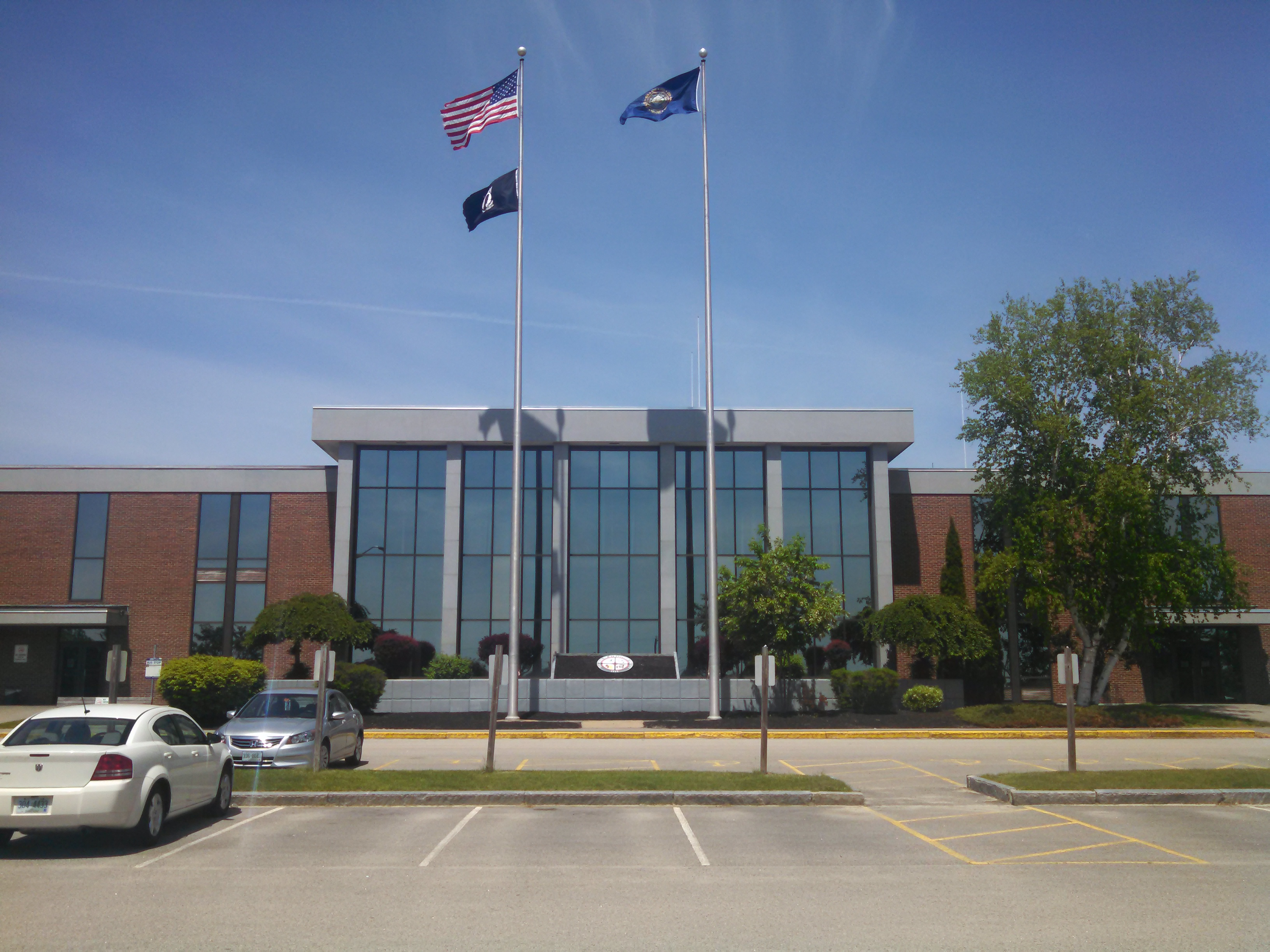
- Strafford County Courthouse

- Seal

- Location within the U.S. state of New Hampshire
- Coordinates: 43°15′30″N 70°58′34″W
- Country: United States
- State: New Hampshire
- Founded: 1771
- Named for: William Wentworth, 2nd Earl of Strafford
- Seat: Dover
- Largest city: Dover

Area
  - Total: 382.6 sq mi (991 km^{2})
  - Land: 367.6 sq mi (952 km^{2})
  - Water: 15.0 sq mi (39 km^{2}) 3.9%

Population (2020)
  - Total: 130,889
  - Estimate (2025): 135,043 ▲
  - Density: 356.1/sq mi (137.5/km^{2})
- Time zone: UTC−5 (Eastern)
  - Summer (DST): UTC−4 (EDT)
- Congressional district: 1st
- Website: straffordcounty.gov

Strafford County is a county in the U.S. state of New Hampshire. As of the 2020 census, the population was 130,889. Its county seat is Dover. Strafford County was one of the five original counties identified for New Hampshire in 1769. It was named after William Wentworth, 2nd Earl of Strafford in the mistaken belief that he was the ancestor of governor John Wentworth – although they were distantly related, William had no descendants. The county was organized at Dover in 1771. In 1840, the size of the original county was reduced with the creation of Belknap County.

Strafford County constitutes a portion of the Boston-Cambridge-Newton, MA-NH Metropolitan Statistical Area as well as of the greater Boston-Worcester-Providence, MA-RI-NH-CT Combined Statistical Area. It is estimated to be New Hampshire's county with the highest percentage growth over the 2010–2019 period.

== Geography ==
Strafford County is in southeastern New Hampshire, separated from York County in the state of Maine by the Salmon Falls River. The southern part of the Salmon Falls, from Rollinsford to Dover, is a tidal river that flows into the Piscataqua River.

According to the United States Census Bureau, the county has a total area of 384 square miles (990 km^{2}), of which 369 square miles (960 km^{2}) is land and 15 square miles (39 km^{2}) (3.9%) is water. It is the smallest county in New Hampshire by area.

=== Adjacent counties ===
- Carroll County (north)
- York County, Maine (east)
- Rockingham County (south)
- Merrimack County (west)
- Belknap County (northwest)

== Demographics ==
Historical population
Census	Pop.	Note	%±
1790	23,611		—
1800	32,614		38.1%
1810	41,595		27.5%
1820	51,117		22.9%
1830	58,910		15.2%
1840	61,127		3.8%
1850	29,374		−51.9%
1860	31,493		7.2%
1870	30,243		−4.0%
1880	35,558		17.6%
1890	38,442		8.1%
1900	39,337		2.3%
1910	38,951		−1.0%
1920	38,546		−1.0%
1930	38,580		0.1%
1940	43,553		12.9%
1950	51,567		18.4%
1960	59,799		16.0%
1970	70,431		17.8%
1980	85,408		21.3%
1990	104,233		22.0%
2000	112,233		7.7%
2010	123,143		9.7%
2020	130,889		6.3%
2025 (est.)	135,043	▲	3.2%
U.S. Decennial Census; 1790–1960 1900–1990; 1990–2000 2010–2020

=== 2020 census ===
As of the 2020 census, the county had a population of 130,889 and a median age of 38.9 years. Residents under the age of 18 made up 17.9% of the population while 16.5% were 65 years of age or older. For every 100 females there were 97.0 males, and for every 100 females age 18 and over there were 95.0 males.

In terms of race and ethnicity, 88.5% of residents identified as White, 1.2% as Black or African American, 0.2% as American Indian and Alaska Native, 3.4% as Asian, 0.0% as Native Hawaiian and Pacific Islander, 1.0% as some other race, and 5.5% as two or more races. Hispanic or Latino residents of any race made up 3.0% of the population.

Sixty-three point three percent of residents lived in urban areas, while 36.7% lived in rural areas.

There were 51,454 households in the county; 26.3% had children under the age of 18 living with them and 24.6% had a female householder with no spouse or partner present. About 27.8% of all households were made up of individuals and 10.6% had someone living alone who was 65 years of age or older. There were 55,706 housing units, of which 7.6% were vacant, and among occupied units 65.4% were owner-occupied while 34.6% were renter-occupied. The homeowner vacancy rate was 0.9% and the rental vacancy rate was 5.9%.

Strafford County, New Hampshire – Racial and ethnic composition Note: the US Census treats Hispanic/Latino as an ethnic category. This table excludes Latinos from the racial categories and assigns them to a separate category. Hispanics/Latinos may be of any race.
Race / Ethnicity (NH = Non-Hispanic)	Pop 2000	Pop 2010	Pop 2020	% 2000	% 2010	% 2020
White alone (NH)	107,364	114,210	114,599	95.66%	92.74%	87.55%
Black or African American alone (NH)	658	1,144	1,434	0.58%	0.92%	1.09%
Native American or Alaska Native alone (NH)	207	234	251	0.18%	0.19%	0.19%
Asian alone (NH)	1,535	3,171	4,473	1.36%	2.57%	3.41%
Pacific Islander alone (NH)	39	41	42	0.03%	0.03%	0.03%
Other race alone (NH)	113	108	403	0.10%	0.08%	0.30%
Mixed race or Multiracial (NH)	1,162	2,034	5,773	1.03%	1.65%	4.41%
Hispanic or Latino (any race)	1,155	2,201	3,914	1.02%	1.78%	2.99%
Total	112,233	123,143	130,889	100.00%	100.00%	100.00%

=== 2010 census ===
As of the 2010 United States census, there were 123,143 people, 47,100 households, and 29,862 families living in the county. The population density was 333.7 inhabitants per square mile (128.8/km^{2}). There were 51,697 housing units at an average density of 140.1 per square mile (54.1/km^{2}). The racial makeup of the county was 93.8% white, 2.6% Asian, 1.0% black or African American, 0.2% American Indian, 0.5% from other races, and 1.9% from two or more races. Those of Hispanic or Latino origin made up 1.8% of the population. In terms of ancestry, 24.4% were French or French Canadian, 19.7% were Irish, 17.4% were English, 9.5% were Italian, 8.7% were German, 5.2% were American, and 5.0% were Scottish.

Of the 47,100 households, 30.6% had children under the age of 18 living with them, 48.4% were married couples living together, 10.5% had a female householder with no husband present, 36.6% were non-families, and 26.3% of all households were made up of individuals. The average household size was 2.44 and the average family size was 2.93. The median age was 36.9 years.

The median income for a household in the county was $57,809 and the median income for a family was $72,286. Males had a median income of $50,489 versus $37,178 for females. The per capita income for the county was $28,059. About 6.7% of families and 11.3% of the population were below the poverty line, including 12.3% of those under age 18 and 8.0% of those age 65 or over.

=== 2000 census ===
As of the census of 2000, there were 112,233 people, 42,581 households, and 27,762 families living in the county. The population density was 304 inhabitants per square mile (117/km^{2}). There were 45,539 housing units at an average density of 124 units per square mile (48/km^{2}). The racial makeup of the county was 96.29% White, 0.63% Black or African American, 0.21% Native American, 1.39% Asian, 0.05% Pacific Islander, 0.30% from other races, and 1.14% from two or more races. 1.03% of the population were Hispanic or Latino of any race. 15.8% were of English, 14.9% Irish, 14.0% French, 10.5% French Canadian, 7.6% American, 6.3% Italian and 6.2% German ancestry. 93.7% spoke English and 3.2% French as their first language.

There were 42,581 households, out of which 32.60% had children under the age of 18 living with them, 51.10% were married couples living together, 10.00% had a female householder with no husband present, and 34.80% were non-families. 24.80% of all households were made up of individuals, and 8.20% had someone living alone who was 65 years of age or older. The average household size was 2.50 and the average family size was 2.98.

In the county, the population was spread out, with 23.70% under the age of 18, 13.60% from 18 to 24, 30.60% from 25 to 44, 20.90% from 45 to 64, and 11.20% who were 65 years of age or older. The median age was 34 years. For every 100 females, there were 94.30 males. For every 100 females age 18 and over, there were 91.10 males.

The median income for a household in the county was $44,803, and the median income for a family was $53,075. Males had a median income of $36,661 versus $26,208 for females. The per capita income for the county was $20,479. About 5.00% of families and 9.20% of the population were below the poverty line, including 9.10% of those under age 18 and 6.60% of those age 65 or over.

The largest cities in Strafford County are Dover (population) and Rochester (land area) .

== Politics and government ==
United States presidential election results for Strafford County, New Hampshire
Year	Republican		Democratic		Third party(ies)	
Year	No.	%	No.	%	No.	%
1876	4,052	54.64%	3,363	45.35%	1	0.01%
1880	4,634	53.78%	3,922	45.51%	61	0.71%
1884	4,370	52.74%	3,781	45.63%	135	1.63%
1888	4,580	51.28%	4,270	47.81%	82	0.92%
1892	4,666	51.68%	4,229	46.84%	134	1.48%
1896	5,483	68.58%	2,259	28.26%	253	3.16%
1900	4,987	55.32%	3,792	42.06%	236	2.62%
1904	4,869	56.58%	3,553	41.29%	183	2.13%
1908	4,822	56.25%	3,523	41.09%	228	2.66%
1912	2,962	37.66%	3,468	44.09%	1,436	18.26%
1916	4,037	49.58%	4,040	49.62%	65	0.80%
1920	8,700	60.37%	5,643	39.15%	69	0.48%
1924	9,167	56.63%	6,445	39.82%	575	3.55%
1928	10,470	58.36%	7,441	41.48%	28	0.16%
1932	9,060	47.44%	9,970	52.20%	68	0.36%
1936	8,215	41.71%	11,005	55.87%	477	2.42%
1940	8,996	41.18%	12,847	58.82%	0	0.00%
1944	9,388	42.87%	12,497	57.07%	13	0.06%
1948	9,988	45.87%	11,603	53.28%	185	0.85%
1952	13,729	53.88%	11,753	46.12%	0	0.00%
1956	15,494	61.58%	9,659	38.39%	7	0.03%
1960	13,539	48.57%	14,335	51.43%	0	0.00%
1964	8,342	31.99%	17,737	68.01%	0	0.00%
1968	12,427	47.28%	13,129	49.95%	727	2.77%
1972	16,846	57.83%	12,028	41.29%	255	0.88%
1976	14,569	48.86%	14,566	48.85%	680	2.28%
1980	16,399	50.41%	11,041	33.94%	5,091	15.65%
1984	20,452	61.31%	12,752	38.23%	152	0.46%
1988	20,636	54.74%	16,547	43.89%	515	1.37%
1992	16,028	33.72%	21,247	44.69%	10,264	21.59%
1996	14,484	33.81%	23,475	54.79%	4,884	11.40%
2000	21,108	42.73%	25,400	51.42%	2,885	5.84%
2004	25,825	43.56%	32,942	55.57%	514	0.87%
2008	25,021	39.19%	37,990	59.50%	837	1.31%
2012	26,729	41.78%	36,026	56.32%	1,214	1.90%
2016	29,072	42.13%	34,894	50.57%	5,034	7.30%
2020	30,489	41.31%	41,721	56.53%	1,595	2.16%
2024	33,162	43.24%	42,373	55.25%	1,165	1.52%

=== County Commission ===
The executive power of Strafford County's government is held by three county commissioners.

Name	Hometown	Party
George Maglaras	Dover	Democratic
Robert Watson	Rochester	Democratic
Deanna Rollo	Rollinsford	Democratic

In addition to the County Commission, there are five directly elected officials: they include County Attorney, Register of Deeds, County Sheriff, Register of Probate, and County Treasurer.

Office	Name
County Attorney	Thomas Velardi (D)
Register of Deeds	Catherine Berube (D)
County Sheriff	Joseph McGivern (D)
Register of Probate	Jan Nedelka (D)
County Treasurer	Pamela Arnold (D)

=== General court ===
The general court delegation of Strafford County is made up of all of the members of the New Hampshire House of Representatives from the county. There are 37 members from 25 different districts. After the 2020 elections, the party distribution of representatives for the county was as follows.

Affiliation	Members	Voting share
Democratic Party	24	64.9%
Republican Party	13	35.1%
Total	37	100%

== Communities ==
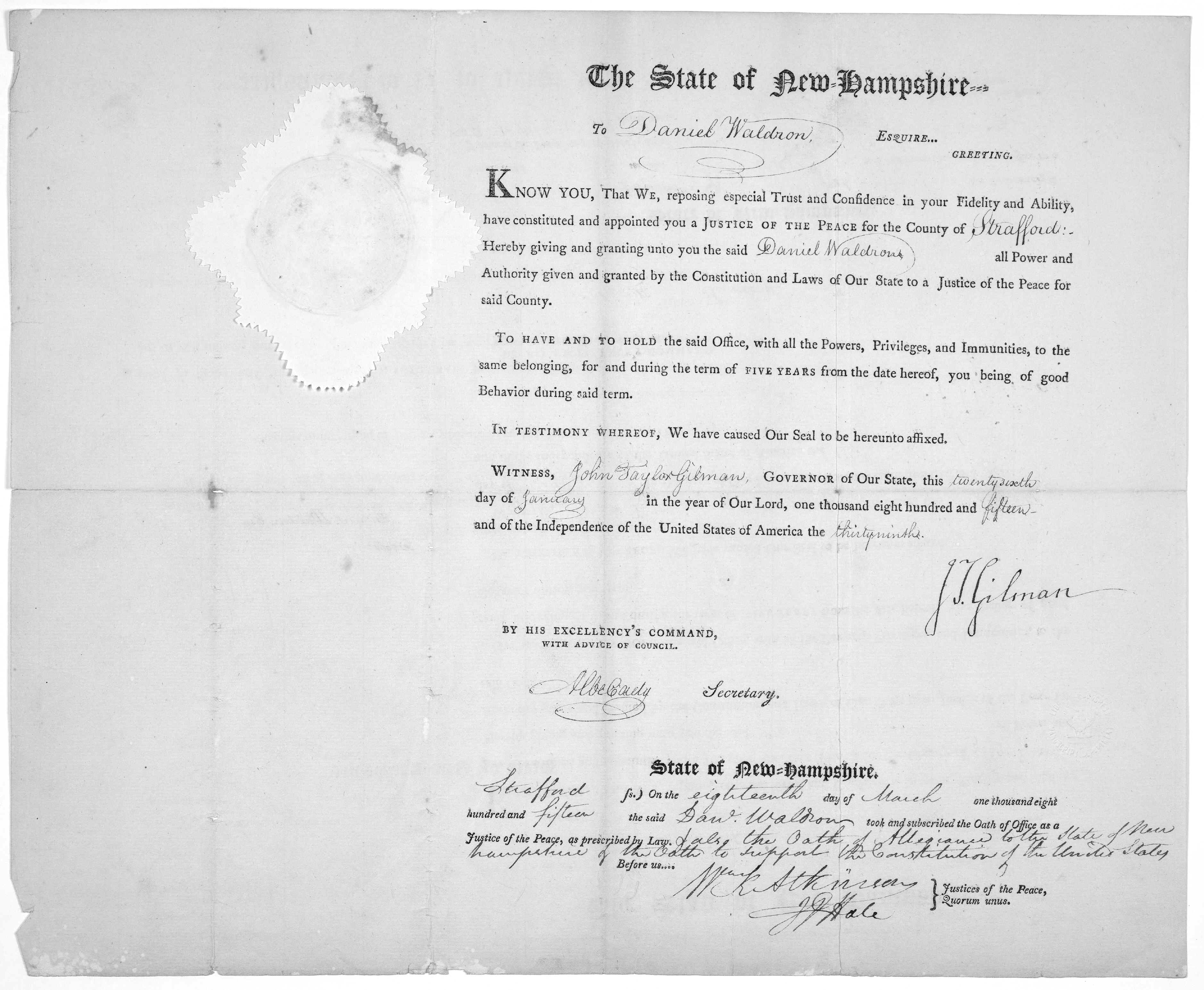
Order naming Daniel Waldron justice of the peace, Strafford County, 1815

=== Cities ===
- Dover (county seat)
- Rochester
- Somersworth

=== Towns ===
- Barrington
- Durham
- Farmington
- Lee
- Madbury
- Middleton
- Milton
- New Durham
- Rollinsford
- Strafford

=== Census-designated places ===
- Durham
- Farmington
- Milton
- Milton Mills

=== Villages ===
- Bow Lake Village
- Center Strafford
- East Rochester
- Gonic
- North Rochester
- Place

== See also ==
- National Register of Historic Places listings in Strafford County, New Hampshire
