= New Hampshire Route 4 =

State highway in Strafford County, New Hampshire, US

New Hampshire Route 4
- Map of Strafford County in southeastern New Hampshire with NH 4 highlighted in red

Route information
- Maintained by NHDOT
- Length: 3.78 mi (6.08 km)

Major junctions
- West end: NH 9 / NH 108 in Dover
- East end: SR 4 in South Berwick, ME

Location
- Country: United States
- State: New Hampshire
- Counties: Strafford

Highway system
- New Hampshire Highway System; Interstate; US; State; Turnpikes
← US 4	→ NH 4A

New Hampshire Route 4 (NH 4) is a 3.78-mile (6.08 km) state highway located in eastern Strafford County, New Hampshire. Its western terminus is at an intersection with New Hampshire Route 9 and New Hampshire Route 108 in Dover. Its northern terminus is at the Maine state border in Rollinsford, where it continues as Maine State Route 4.

For most of its length NH 4 is signed as an east–west highway. Signage in downtown Dover while overlapped with NH 9 and NH 108 is inconsistent as it is sometimes signed north–south. In general, NH 4 follows a southwest-to-northeast alignment.

NH 4 is not related to U.S. Route 4, which also enters the Dover city limits. They are the only non-linked highways to share a number in New Hampshire and remain under NHDOT maintenance. (Maine State Route 113 does cross into New Hampshire near NH 113, but remains completely under MaineDOT maintenance.)

== Route description ==
=== Western terminus ===
The western terminus of NH 4 is not readily apparent, but signage suggests it to be at the intersection of Central Avenue and Silver Street (where NH 9 and NH 108 split). Signage at the intersection of Silver Street and Central Avenue seems to indicate NH 4 continuing westbound along NH 9; however, no further signage for NH 4 exists west of this point.

=== Downtown Dover ===
From the intersection of Central Avenue and Silver Street, NH 4 is overlapped with NH 9 and NH 108 for 0.5 miles (0.80 km), until NH 4 splits off in the center of town. The exact routing differs depending on which direction one is traveling, due to the one-way streets it traverses in the downtown area.

In the eastbound direction, NH 4 is overlapped with NH 9 east / NH 108 north onto Main Street then splits off onto Portland Avenue, on which it remains.

However, in the westbound direction NH 4 (as signed) splits from Portland Avenue onto Chapel Street. It then turns right onto Saint John Street, left onto Broadway, then left onto Central Avenue (NH 9 west / NH 108 south).

Westbound Portland Avenue from Chapel Street to Main Street is signed as a truck route. To continue to the main route, traffic must turn right onto Main Street then make a left-hand U-turn to loop around onto Central Avenue.

=== Rollinsford ===
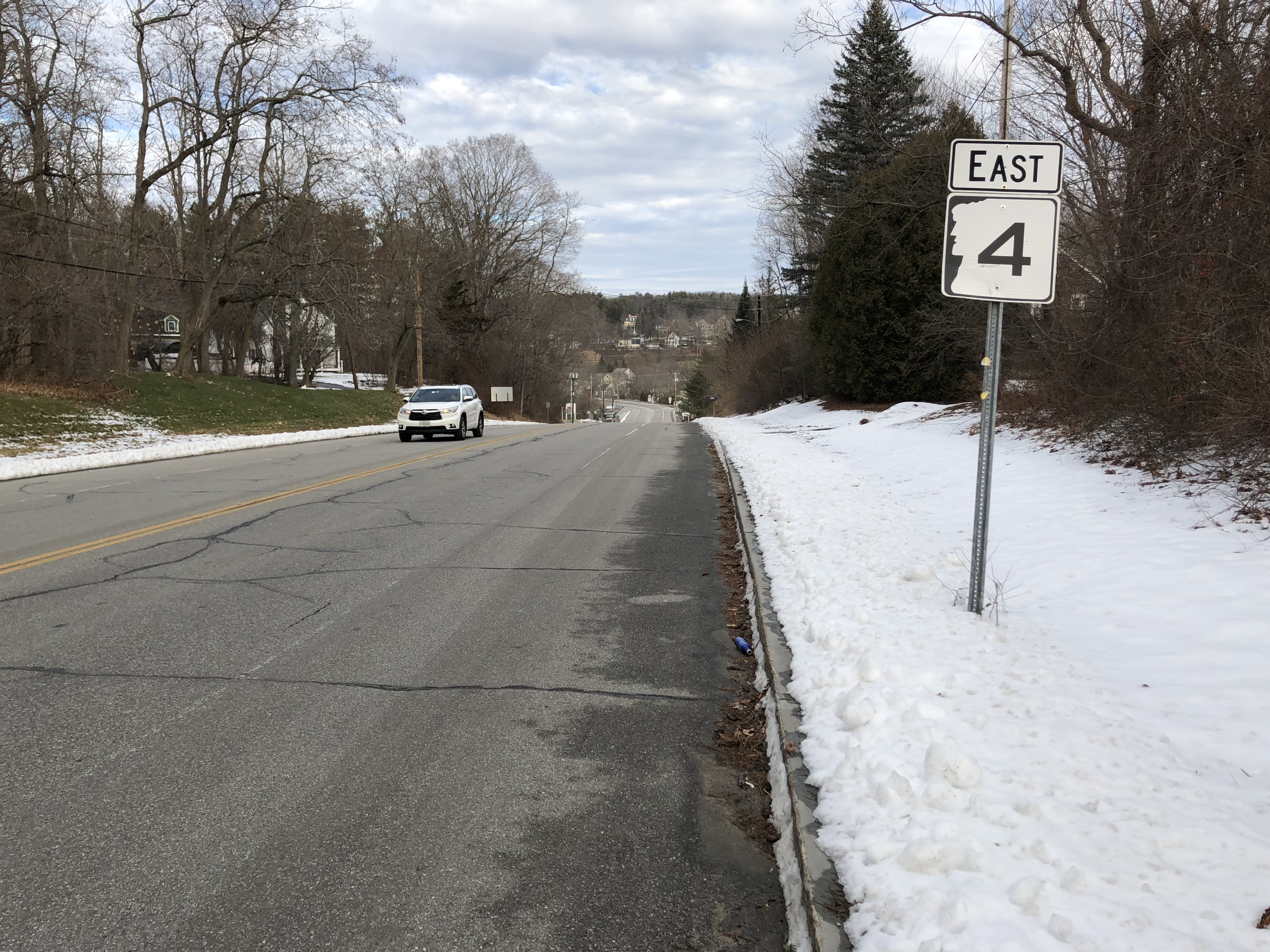
NH 4 in Rollinsford, with South Berwick, ME in the distance

After leaving downtown Dover, NH 4 crosses into the town of Rollinsford. It is the only state route to pass through Rollinsford and runs in the south-central part of town for about 2.5 miles (4.0 km). NH 4 then crosses the Salmon Falls River into the town of South Berwick, Maine, and becomes Maine State Route 4 (which is signed as a north–south highway).

NH 4 is named Portland Avenue in Rollinsford.

== History ==

NH 4 (and State Route 4 in Maine by extension) was originally intended to be a part of US 4, hence its number. However, US 4 was ultimately routed from Durham to the southern tip of Dover and along the Spaulding Turnpike to Portsmouth. While US 4 never entered Maine, the number 4 was retained for the resulting state highway in Maine. For continuity's sake, New Hampshire kept the number 4 on its section of the highway as well.

US 4 only travels through a small section of southern Dover (mostly along the Spaulding Turnpike) which is several miles from downtown, meaning it was unlikely that the two highways would be easily confused.

== Major intersections ==
The entire route is in Strafford County.

Location	mi	km	Destinations	Notes
Dover	0.000	0.000	NH 9 west (Silver Street) to NH 155 – Madbury, Lee NH 108 south (Central Avenue) to NH 16 (Spaulding Turnpike) – Durham, Portsmouth	Western terminus
Dover	0.5	0.80	NH 9 east / NH 108 north (Central Avenue) – Somersworth, Rochester	Northern end of concurrency with NH 9 / NH 108
Rollinsford	3.78	6.08	SR 4 north (Main Street) to SR 236 - South Berwick ME	Continuation into Maine
1.000 mi = 1.609 km; 1.000 km = 0.621 mi: Concurrency terminus

== Concurrent routes ==
- New Hampshire Route 9 / New Hampshire Route 108: 0.5 miles (0.80 km), Dover

== Suffixed routes ==
=== New Hampshire Route 4A ===

This route between Lebanon and Andover is an alternate route of US 4 and is not associated with NH 4.
