= New Hampshire Route 108 =

Highway in New Hampshire and Massachusetts

Route 108
- Map of southeastern New Hampshire and northeastern Massachusetts with NH 108 highlighted in solid red and with MA 108 highlighted in dotted red

Route information
- Maintained by NHDOT
- Length: 42.430 mi (68.284 km)

Major junctions
- South end: Route 110 in Haverhill, MA
- NH 101 in Exeter, NH; US 4 in Durham, NH; NH 16 / Spaulding Turnpike in Dover, NH; NH 4 / NH 9 in Dover, NH
- North end: NH 125 / NH 202A in Rochester, NH

Location
- Country: United States
- State: New Hampshire
- Counties: Essex (MA), Rockingham (NH), Strafford (NH)

Highway system
- New Hampshire Highway System; Interstate; US; State; Turnpikes
← NH 107A	→ NH 109
← Route 107	MA	→ Route 109

New Hampshire Route 108 is a 42.430-mile-long (68.284 km) north–south state highway in Rockingham and Strafford counties in southeastern New Hampshire. The southern terminus of NH 108 is at the Massachusetts state line in Plaistow. The northern terminus is at an intersection with New Hampshire Route 125 and New Hampshire Route 202A in downtown Rochester.

At its southern end, NH 108 connects to Massachusetts Route 108, a very short state route which continues south for 0.91 miles (1.46 km) to Massachusetts Route 110 in Haverhill.

NH 108 is notable in being one of two routes (the other being New Hampshire Route 9) to intersect both U.S. Route 4 and New Hampshire Route 4 (a rare case of two completely separate routes in one state having the same number).

== Route description ==
=== Massachusetts Route 108 ===
Route 108 begins at an intersection with Route 110 north of downtown Haverhill, Massachusetts, near Kenoza Lake. The highway proceeds due north, passing underneath I-495 less than 500 feet before crossing into Plaistow, New Hampshire, where it becomes NH 108.

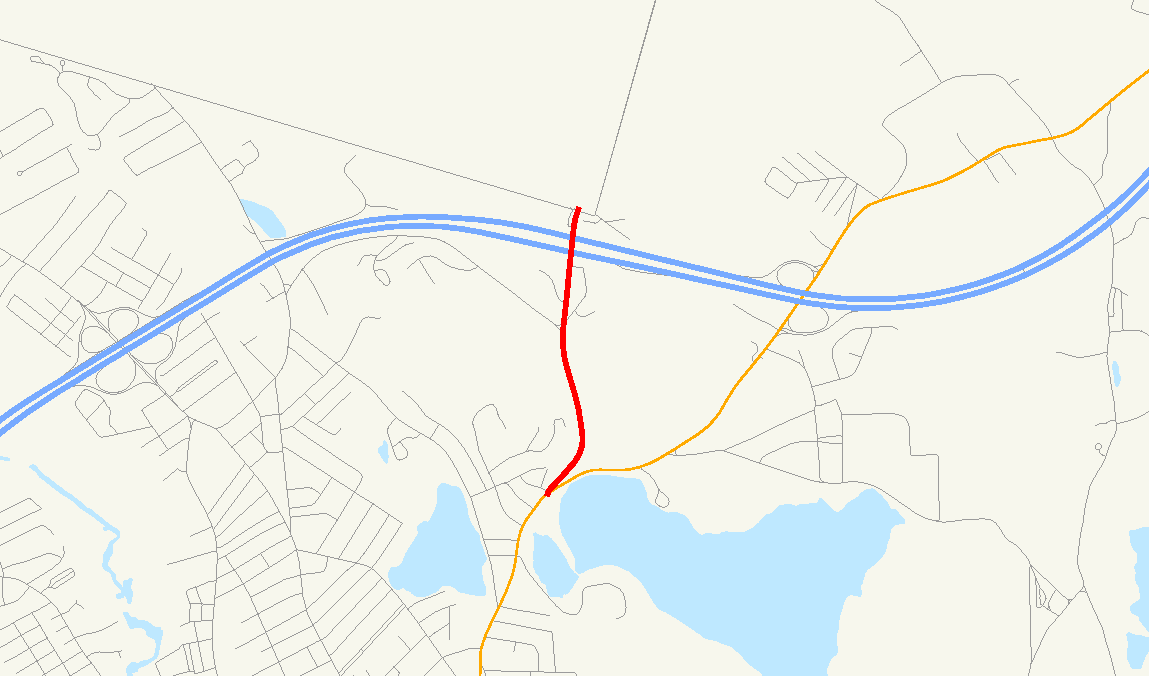
Map of Massachusetts Route 108, a southward extension of NH 108 into Haverhill

=== Plaistow to Exeter ===
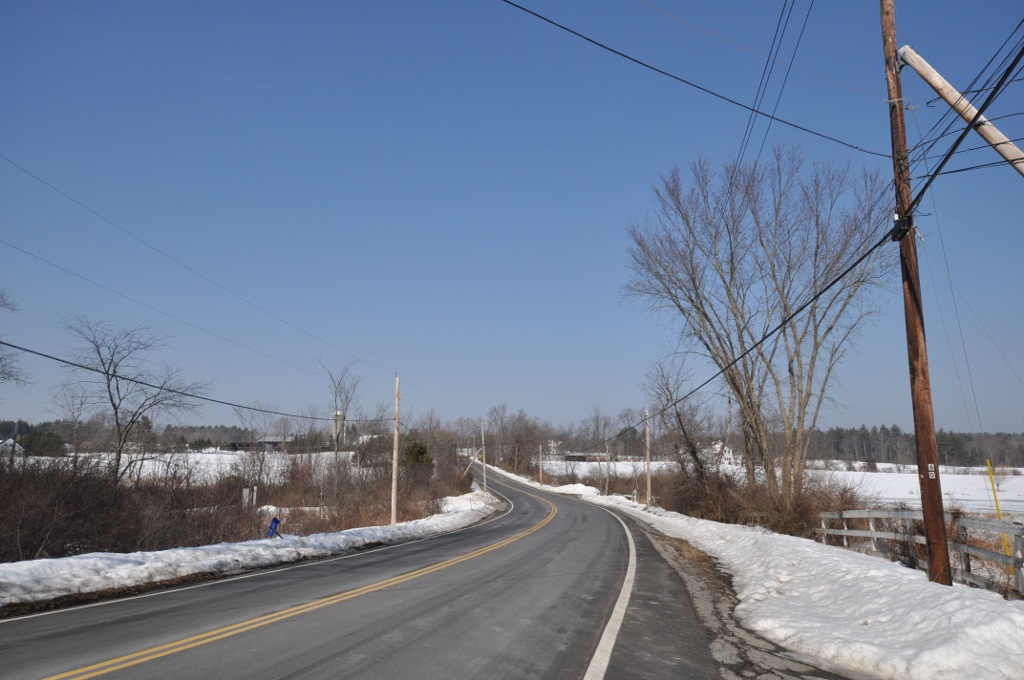
Looking north on Route 108 in East Kingston

NH 108 runs along the eastern edge of Plaistow, near the Massachusetts border, before crossing through Newton into East Kingston, where it crosses NH 107A, then turns eastward to form a brief wrong-way concurrency with NH 107. Continuing north, NH 108 passes through Kensington, where it meets the north end of NH 150 and continues north into Exeter. In Exeter, NH 108 meets NH 27, NH 111 and NH 111A, forming a very brief overlap with the former two routes. NH 108 meets the western end of NH 88, then interchanges with the NH 101 freeway at exit 11.

=== Stratham to Dover ===
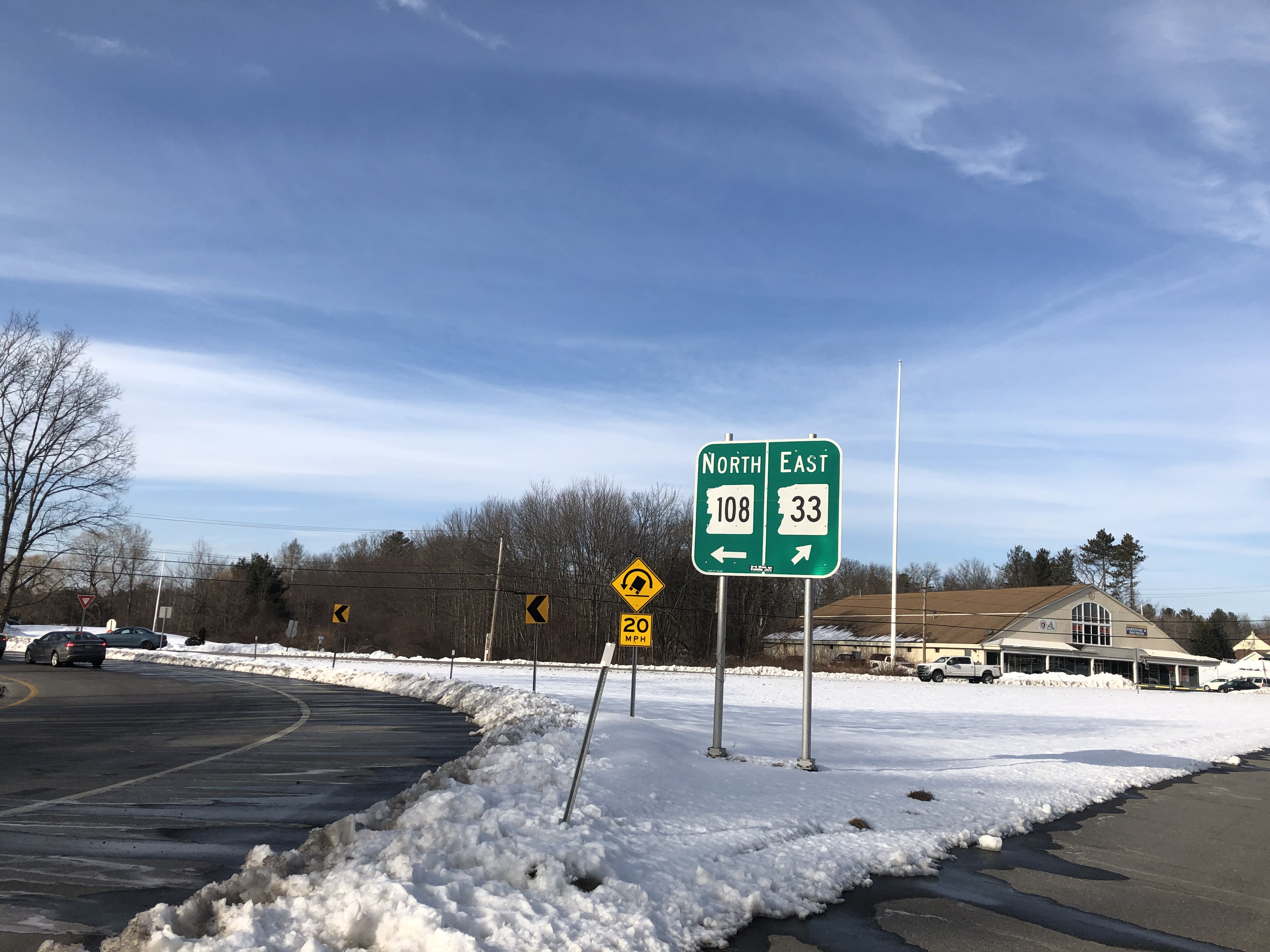
Route 108 at the traffic circle in Stratham, the western terminus of Route 33

NH 108 crosses into Stratham where it meets NH 33, a connector to US 1 in Portsmouth which also interchanges with I-95, at a traffic circle. Continuing northward, NH 108 passes through Newfields and Newmarket, intersecting with NH 85 and NH 152 along the way. The road crosses into Durham and Strafford County, passing through the center of town just east of the University of New Hampshire main campus, and then interchanging with US 4. NH 108 continues through eastern Madbury and into the city of Dover.

=== Dover to Rochester ===
NH 108 interchanges with the Spaulding Turnpike (NH 16) at exit 7, becoming Central Avenue, the main road in downtown Dover. The road intersects NH 9 and NH 4 at Silver Street. NH 4 has its western terminus here. The three routes briefly run concurrently in the center of Dover, before NH 4 splits off towards South Berwick, Maine via Portland Avenue. NH 9 and NH 108 continue north until NH 9 splits off towards Berwick, Maine, near an intersection with the Spaulding Turnpike at Exit 9 (via Indian Brook Drive). NH 108 continues north into the city limits of Somersworth, where it meets NH 236, a short connector to NH 9 bound for Berwick. NH 108 serves as Somersworth's industrial strip, then continues north into Rochester. NH 108 terminates at the intersection of South Main Street and Columbus Avenue (NH 125), a terminus it shares with NH 202A. South Main Street continues into downtown as NH 202A westbound.

The Dover to Rochester section of NH 108 is scheduled for a $11.36 million improvement project, to begin in 2022, "to improve safety and mobility for drivers, pedestrians, bikers and transit users," according to NHDOT.

== Major intersections ==
County	Location	mi	km	Destinations	Notes
Essex	Haverhill	0.00	0.00	Route 110 (Amesbury Road / Kenoza Avenue) – Amesbury, Lawrence	Southern terminus of Route 108
Massachusetts–New Hampshire state line		0.91 0.000	1.46 0.000	Route transition	
Rockingham	East Kingston	8.023	12.912	NH 107A (Powwow River Road / Burnt Swamp Road) – Kingston, South Hampton	
Rockingham	East Kingston	9.191	14.791	NH 107 north (Depot Road) – Kingston	Southern end of NH 107 concurrency
Rockingham	East Kingston	10.077	16.217	NH 107 south (East Road) – Kensington, Seabrook	Northern end of NH 107 concurrency
Rockingham	Kensington	13.399	21.564	NH 150 south (Amesbury Road) – Kensington, Amesbury MA	Northern terminus of NH 150
Rockingham	Exeter	15.252	24.546	NH 111 west (Front Street) – Kingston	Southern end of NH 111 concurrency
Rockingham	Exeter	15.336	24.681	NH 27 west / NH 111A west (Water Street) – Brentwood, Epping	Southern end of NH 27 concurrency; eastern terminus of NH 111A
Rockingham	Exeter	15.567	25.053	NH 27 east / NH 111 east (High Street) – Hampton, North Hampton	Northern end of NH 27/NH 111 concurrency
Rockingham	Exeter	16.515	26.578	NH 88 east (Holland Way) – Hampton Falls	Western terminus of NH 88
Rockingham	Stratham	16.586– 16.824	26.693– 27.076	NH 101 (Exeter-Hampton Expressway) to I-95 – Hampton, North Hampton, Epping, Manchester	Exit 11 on NH 101
Rockingham	Stratham	18.934	30.471	NH 33 east (Portsmouth Avenue) – Greenland, Portsmouth	Western terminus of NH 33
Rockingham	Newfields	20.615	33.177	NH 85 south (Main Street) to NH 87 – Newfields	Northern terminus of NH 85
Rockingham	Newmarket	23.266	37.443	NH 152 west (South Main Street) – Lee	Eastern terminus of NH 152
Strafford	Durham	27.997– 28.075	45.057– 45.182	US 4 (Piscataqua Road) – Concord, Portsmouth	Interchange
Strafford	Dover	31.382– 31.582	50.504– 50.826	NH 16 / Spaulding Turnpike – Portsmouth, Boston, Somersworth, Rochester	Exit 7 on Spaulding Turnpike
Strafford	Dover	32.189	51.803	NH 4 west / NH 9 west (Silver Street) / NH 155 – Madbury	Western terminus of NH 4; southern end of NH 9 concurrency
Strafford	Dover	32.717	52.653	NH 4 east (Portland Avenue) – Rollinsford, South Berwick ME	Northern end of NH 4 concurrency
Strafford	Dover	34.891	56.152	NH 9 east (Indian Brook Drive) to NH 16 / Spaulding Turnpike – Somersworth, Berwick, ME	Northern end of NH 9 concurrency
Strafford	Somersworth	38.168	61.425	NH 236 east (West High Street) – Somersworth, Berwick ME	Western terminus of NH 236
Strafford	Rochester	42.430	68.284	NH 125 (Columbus Avenue) / NH 202A west (South Main Street) – Gonic, Milton	Northern terminus of NH 108; eastern terminus of NH 202A
1.000 mi = 1.609 km; 1.000 km = 0.621 mi: Concurrency terminus; Route transition

== History ==
The designation for NH 108 was in use by 1927, essentially following its present-day route from the Massachusetts border to Dover.

Until the early 1990s, NH 108 ended in Dover at an intersection with NH 16 (locally, at the Central Avenue intersection with Stark Avenue / Dover Point Road). When NHDOT rerouted NH 16 onto the Spaulding Turnpike as a concurrency, the section of NH 16 from the noted intersection in Dover to NH 125 in Rochester became a northward extension of NH 108.
