= New Hampshire Route 152 =

State highway in southeastern New Hampshire, US

New Hampshire Route 152
- Map of southeastern New Hampshire with NH 152 highlighted in red

Route information
- Maintained by NHDOT
- Length: 15.449 mi (24.863 km)

Major junctions
- West end: US 4 in Northwood
- NH 125 in Lee
- East end: NH 108 in Newmarket

Location
- Country: United States
- State: New Hampshire
- Counties: Rockingham, Strafford

Highway system
- New Hampshire Highway System; Interstate; US; State; Turnpikes
← NH 151	→ NH 153

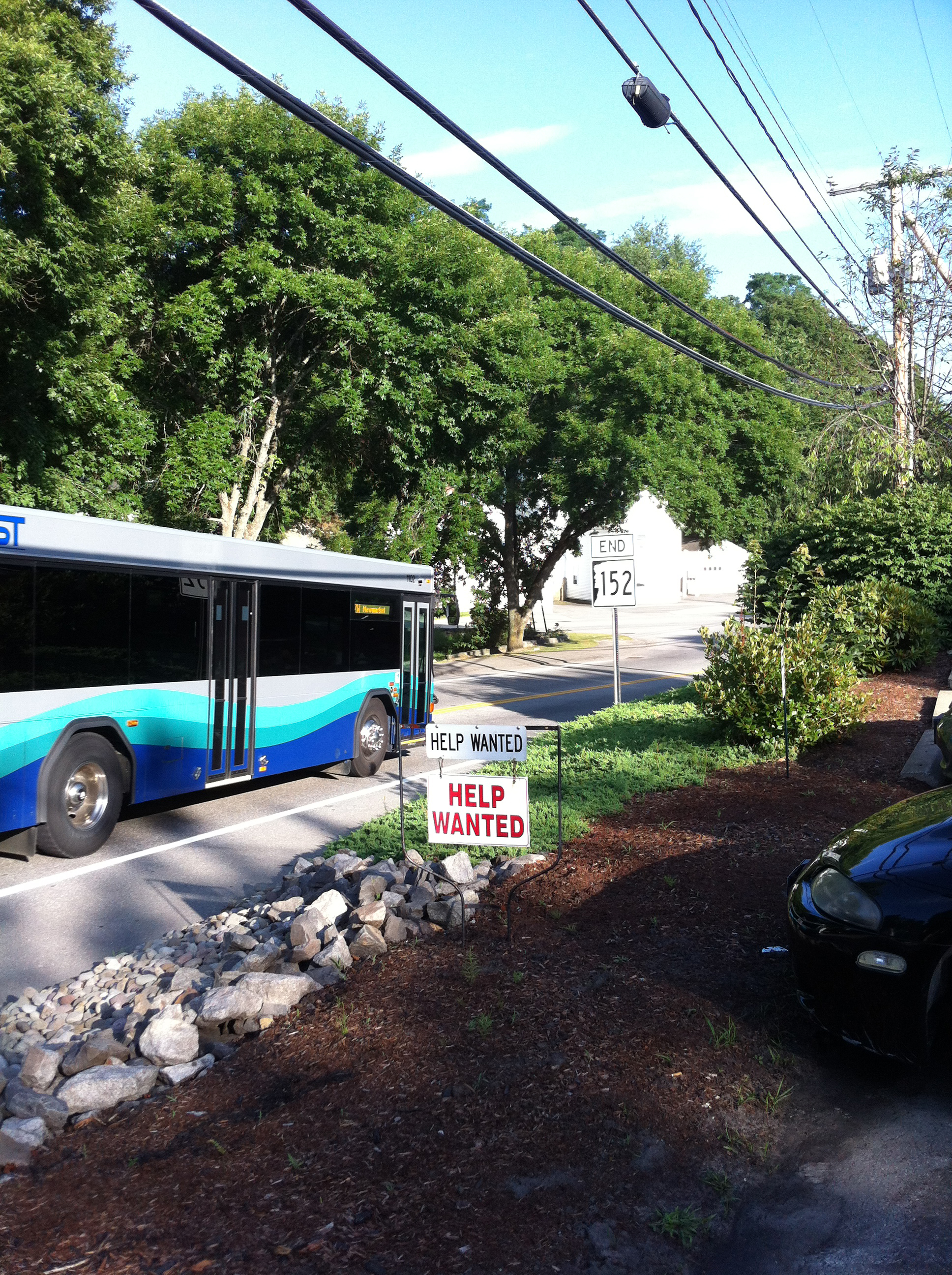
The eastern terminus of NH 152 in Newmarket. A COAST bus drives by.

New Hampshire Route 152 (abbreviated NH 152) is a 15.449-mile-long (24.863 km) east–west highway in Rockingham and Strafford counties in southeastern New Hampshire. It runs from an intersection with U.S. Route 4 near the Northwood/Nottingham town line east to an intersection with New Hampshire Route 108 in Newmarket.

== Route description ==
NH 152 begins at US 4 in Northwood, just yards west of the Nottingham town line. The highway proceeds southeast into the town center, where it intersects with NH 156, a short connector to Raymond to the south. NH 152 continues southeast into Lee, then turns due east and crosses NH 125, followed by NH 155 shortly thereafter. The highway traverses the southern edge of Lee, then crosses into Newmarket. NH 152 continues east into downtown Newmarket, terminating at NH 108 in the town center.

== Major intersections ==
County	Location	mi	km	Destinations	Notes
Rockingham	Northwood	0.000	0.000	US 4 (First New Hampshire Turnpike) to US 202 / NH 9 / NH 43 – Concord, Portsmouth	Western terminus
Rockingham	Nottingham	5.799	9.333	NH 156 south (Raymond Road) – Raymond	Northern terminus of NH 156
Strafford	Lee	9.346	15.041	NH 125 (Calef Highway) – Epping, Rochester	
Strafford	Lee	10.402	16.740	NH 155 (North River Road) – Madbury, Dover	
Rockingham	Newmarket	15.449	24.863	NH 108 (Main Street / Exeter Road) – Durham, Stratham	Eastern terminus
1.000 mi = 1.609 km; 1.000 km = 0.621 mi
