= NH 152 =

NH 152 may refer to:

- National Highway 152 (India)
- New Hampshire Route 152, United States
