= NH4 =

NH4 or NH 4 or NH-4 may refer to:

- Ammonium, the cation NH^{+}_{4} in chemistry
- National Highway 4 (India), new numbering for a National Highway in India
- National Highway 4 (India, old numbering), a major National Highway in western and southern India
- New Hampshire Route 4, a short state highway located in eastern Strafford County, New Hampshire, United States
