= New Hampshire Route 156 =

State highway in Rockingham County, New Hampshire, US

New Hampshire Route 156
- Map of Rockingham County in southeastern New Hampshire with NH 156 highlighted in red

Route information
- Maintained by NHDOT
- Length: 6.423 mi (10.337 km)

Major junctions
- South end: NH 27 / NH 107 in Raymond
- North end: NH 152 in Nottingham

Location
- Country: United States
- State: New Hampshire
- Counties: Rockingham

Highway system
- New Hampshire Highway System; Interstate; US; State; Turnpikes
| ← NH 155 | → NH 171 |

New Hampshire Route 156 (NH 156) is a 6.424-mile-long (10.338 km) secondary north–south highway in Rockingham County in southeastern New Hampshire. The road runs from Raymond to Nottingham.

The southern terminus of NH 156 is at New Hampshire Route 27 and New Hampshire Route 107 on the east side of Raymond. The northern terminus is in Nottingham at NH 152.

== Route description ==
NH 156 begins at an intersection with NH 27 and NH 107 in Raymond, located near the exit 5 interchange of NH 101. The short highway travels north in a generally northeastern direction. It passes by two cemeteries and Pawtuckaway Lake before reaching its northern terminus at an intersection with NH 152 in Nottingham.

== Major intersections ==
The entire route is in Rockingham County.

| Location | mi | km | Destinations | Notes |
|---|---|---|---|---|
| Raymond | 0.000 | 0.000 | NH 27 / NH 107 to NH 101 / NH 102 – Epping, Candia, Fremont | Southern terminus |
| Nottingham | 6.424 | 10.338 | NH 152 (Stage Road) – Northwood, Lee | Northern terminus |
1.000 mi = 1.609 km; 1.000 km = 0.621 mi
