= New Hampshire Route 126 =

State highway in eastern New Hampshire, US

New Hampshire Route 126
- Map of eastern New Hampshire with NH 126 highlighted in red

Route information
- Maintained by NHDOT
- Length: 15.265 mi (24.567 km)

Major junctions
- South end: NH 9 in Barrington
- US 202 in Barrington
- North end: NH 28 in Barnstead

Location
- Country: United States
- State: New Hampshire
- Counties: Strafford, Belknap

Highway system
- New Hampshire Highway System; Interstate; US; State; Turnpikes
← NH 125	→ NH 127

New Hampshire Route 126 (abbreviated NH 126) is a 15.265-mile-long (24.567 km) north–south state highway in eastern New Hampshire. It runs between the towns of Barrington and Barnstead.

The southern terminus of NH 126 is in Barrington at New Hampshire Route 9, where NH 126 is named Barnstead Road. The northern terminus is in the town of Barnstead at New Hampshire Route 28.

== Major intersections ==
County	Location	mi	km	Destinations	Notes
Strafford	Barrington	0.000	0.000	NH 9 (Franklin Pierce Highway) to US 202 – Northwood, Dover	Southern terminus
Strafford	Barrington	1.252	2.015	US 202 east (Washington Street) – Rochester	Southern end of concurrency with US 202
Strafford	Barrington	1.444	2.324	US 202 west (Washington Street) to NH 9 – Northwood	Northern end of concurrency with US 202
Strafford	Strafford	5.477	8.814	NH 202A east (Strafford Road) – Rochester	Southern end of concurrency with NH 202A
Strafford	Strafford	5.677	9.136	NH 202A west (Roller Coaster Road) – Northwood	Northern end of concurrency with NH 202A
Belknap	Barnstead	15.265	24.567	NH 28 (Suncook Valley Road) – Pittsfield, Alton	Northern terminus
1.000 mi = 1.609 km; 1.000 km = 0.621 mi: Concurrency terminus
