= NH 9 =

NH 9 may refer to:

- National Highway 9 (India)
- New Hampshire Route 9, United States
