= New Hampshire Route 236 =

State highway in Strafford County, New Hampshire, US

New Hampshire Route 236
- NH 236 highlighted in red

Route information
- Maintained by NHDOT
- Length: 2.589 mi (4.167 km)

Major junctions
- West end: NH 108 in Somersworth
- NH 9 in Somersworth
- East end: SR 9 at the Maine state line in Somersworth

Location
- Country: United States
- State: New Hampshire
- Counties: Strafford

Highway system
- New Hampshire Highway System; Interstate; US; State; Turnpikes
← NH 202A	→ NH 286

New Hampshire Route 236 (abbreviated NH 236) is a 2.589-mile-long (4.167 km) east–west state highway located entirely in the city of Somersworth, New Hampshire. Its western terminus is at an intersection with New Hampshire Route 108 west of downtown. Its eastern terminus is at the Maine state line, where the highway crosses the border into Berwick, Maine overlapped with New Hampshire Route 9. The roadway continues into Maine as Maine State Route 9.

Some older signs in downtown Somersworth show NH 236 as a north–south highway, but more recent signage is indicative of its east–west orientation.

== Route description ==
NH 236 begins at NH 108 in western Somersworth and initially travels due east. Upon reaching downtown, the highway turns to the north and intersects NH 9 (High Street). NH 236 joins NH 9 and the two routes continue through the downtown area, before crossing the Salmon Falls River into Berwick, Maine just 1/2 mile (0.80 km) to the north.

NH 236 ends, but its implied continuation, Maine State Route 236, begins less than 1/4 mile (0.40 km) past the state line, splitting from SR 9 in the town center of Berwick. No concurrency is signed on the Maine side, resulting in a short gap between the two highways signed solely as SR 9.

NH 236 runs through the western side of Somersworth, and is known as West High Street. The section cosigned with NH 9 downtown runs along High and Market Streets.

== Junction list ==
The entire route is in Somersworth, Strafford County.

mi	km	Destinations	Notes
0.000	0.000	NH 108 – Dover, Rochester	Western terminus
2.072	3.335	NH 9 west (High Street) – Dover	Western end of NH 9 concurrency
2.589	4.167	SR 9 east (School Street) to SR 236 south – Berwick, ME NH 9 ends	Continuation into Maine; eastern terminus of NH 9
1.000 mi = 1.609 km; 1.000 km = 0.621 mi: Concurrency terminus
