= New Hampshire Route 202A =

Highway in New Hampshire

New Hampshire Route 202A
- Map of southeastern New Hampshire with NH 202A highlighted in red

Route information
- Auxiliary route of US 202
- Maintained by NHDOT
- Length: 14.639 mi (23.559 km)

Major junctions
- West end: US 202 / NH 9 in Northwood
- East end: NH 108 / NH 125 in Rochester

Location
- Country: United States
- State: New Hampshire
- Counties: Rockingham, Strafford

Highway system
- New Hampshire Highway System; Interstate; US; State; Turnpikes
← US 202	→ NH 236

New Hampshire Route 202A (NH 202A) is a 14.639-mile-long (23.559 km) east–west state highway in Strafford and Rockingham counties in southeastern New Hampshire, serving as a northern loop of U.S. Route 202. Its western terminus is in Northwood at US 202 and New Hampshire Route 9, and its eastern terminus is in Rochester at New Hampshire Route 108 and New Hampshire Route 125.

== Route description ==
=== Northwood and Strafford ===
NH 202A begins in Northwood as an offshoot of US 202 (overlapped with NH 9) and proceeds due north towards the town of Strafford. The highway runs into the center of town, intersecting and briefly overlapping NH 126 before turning eastward. NH 202A continues east, passing briefly through the northern corner of Barrington before crossing into the city of Rochester.

=== Rochester ===
NH 202A enters Rochester as Strafford Road, then turns east onto Crown Point Road before becoming Walnut Street. The road proceeds east into downtown, passing under the Spaulding Turnpike (US 202 / NH 16) without an interchange. The nearest interchanges to the turnpike are located at exits 13, 14 or 15. Walnut Street ends at a five-way intersection with Washington and North Main streets; NH 202A continues east onto North Main Street, which becomes one-way eastbound after crossing the Cocheco River and transitions onto South Main Street. Due to the counter-clockwise one-way flow of traffic in downtown Rochester, westbound NH 202A traffic transitions from South Main onto Wakefield Street, then must turn left onto Union Street and right onto North Main Street. The NH 202A designation continues for 0.3 miles (0.48 km) before terminating at Columbus Avenue (NH 125). Traffic continuing on South Main Street transitions directly onto NH 108 southbound.

== Major intersections ==
County	Location	mi	km	Destinations	Notes
Rockingham	Northwood	0.000	0.000	US 202 / NH 9 (Rochester Road) to US 4 / NH 43 – Concord, Portsmouth	Western terminus
Strafford	Strafford	5.657	9.104	NH 126 north (Parker Mountain Road) – Barnstead	Western end of concurrency with NH 126
Strafford	Strafford	5.857	9.426	NH 126 south (Parker Mountain Road) – Barrington	Eastern end of concurrency with NH 126
Strafford	Rochester	14.639	23.559	NH 108 south (South Main Street) – Somersworth, Dover; NH 125 (Columbus Avenue) – Milton, Gonic	Eastern terminus; northern terminus of NH 108
1.000 mi = 1.609 km; 1.000 km = 0.621 mi: Concurrency terminus

== See also ==
- List of state highways in New Hampshire
- New Hampshire Historical Marker No. 191: Arched Bridge
