= Caroline E. Kelly Davis =

American writer (1831–1921)

- Born: March 29, 1831; Northwood
- Died: August 14, 1921 (aged 90); Everett
- Resting place: Exeter Cemetery
- Occupation: Writer

Caroline E. Kelly Davis (March 29, 1831 – August 14, 1921) was an American writer.

Caroline Emma Kelly was born on March 29, 1831 in Northwood, New Hampshire, the daughter of politician John Kelly and Susan Hilton Kelly. She married the Reverend William F. Davis in 1867.

Davis wrote dozens of Sunday School and children's books. One of these was The Yachtville Boys (1869), one of the earliest novels to depict baseball.

Caroline E. Kelly Davis died on 14 August 1921 in Everett, Massachusetts.

== Partial bibliography ==
- Little Apple Blossom. The Hillside Library. Boston: Henry Hoyt, 1863.
- The Yachtville Boys. Boston: Henry Hoyt, 1869.
- The Sunny Path. Nashville: Publishing House of the Methodist Episcopal Church, South, J. D. Barbee, Agent, ca. 1887.
