= Camp Yavneh =

Jewish summer camp in New Hampshire, US

- Location within New Hampshire
- Location: Northwood, New Hampshire
- Coordinates: 43°10′57″N 71°9′57″W
- Elevation: 496 ft
- Campus size: 65 acres
- Established: July 5, 1944; 82 years ago
- Website: campyavneh.org

Camp Yavneh (Hebrew: מחנה יבנה) is a 65-acre residential Jewish summer camp in Northwood, New Hampshire. It was established in 1944 by the Boston Hebrew Teacher College under the leadership of Louis and Leah Hurwich, initially as a Hebrew study camp. The current director for summer 2026 is Yair Cohen.

Yavneh is accredited by the American Camp Association. It offers children aged 8–17 a camp environment where Jewish values and activities are emphasized. The camp is not affiliated with one religious movement, considering itself K'lal Yisrael (lit. 'all Jews are one').

Rising 12th graders have the option to participate in a six-week educational trip to Israel. This trip is called "Na'aleh" (נאלה). The trip is usually staffed by one or two mature counselors, who have worked at the camp for multiple years.
