= Jenness Pond =

Lake in Rockingham County, New Hampshire, United States

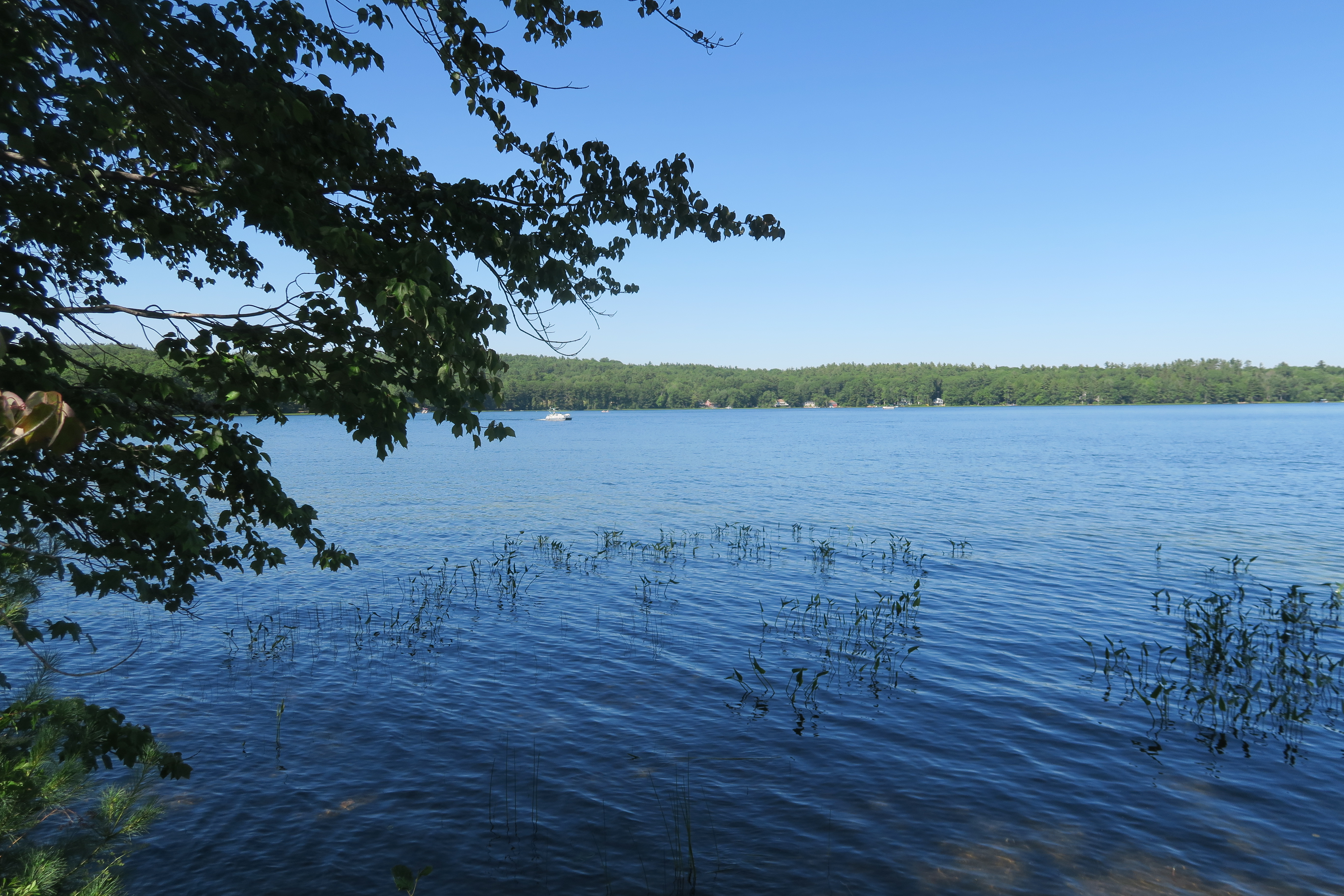

- Location within New Hampshire Location within the United States
- Location: Rockingham County and Merrimack County, New Hampshire
- Coordinates: 43°15′26″N 71°15′8″W
- Primary outflows: Jenness Brook
- Basin countries: United States
- Max. length: 1.1 mi (1.8 km)
- Max. width: 0.7 mi (1.1 km)
- Surface area: 267 acres (1.08 km^{2})
- Average depth: 9 feet (2.7 m)
- Max. depth: 28 feet (8.5 m)
- Surface elevation: 658 ft (201 m)
- Settlements: Northwood; Pittsfield

Jenness Pond is a 267-acre (108 ha) water body located primarily in Rockingham County in southern New Hampshire, United States, in the town of Northwood. A small portion of the pond at its northwest end lies in Pittsfield in Merrimack County. The pond's outlet, Jenness Brook (called Narrows Brook farther downstream), is a feeder of Northwood Lake, part of the Suncook River / Merrimack River / Gulf of Maine watershed.

The lake is classified as a warmwater fishery and contains largemouth and smallmouth bass, chain pickerel, and horned pout.

== See also ==
- List of lakes in New Hampshire
