= South Berwick (CDP), Maine =

South Berwick, Maine
- Census-designated place
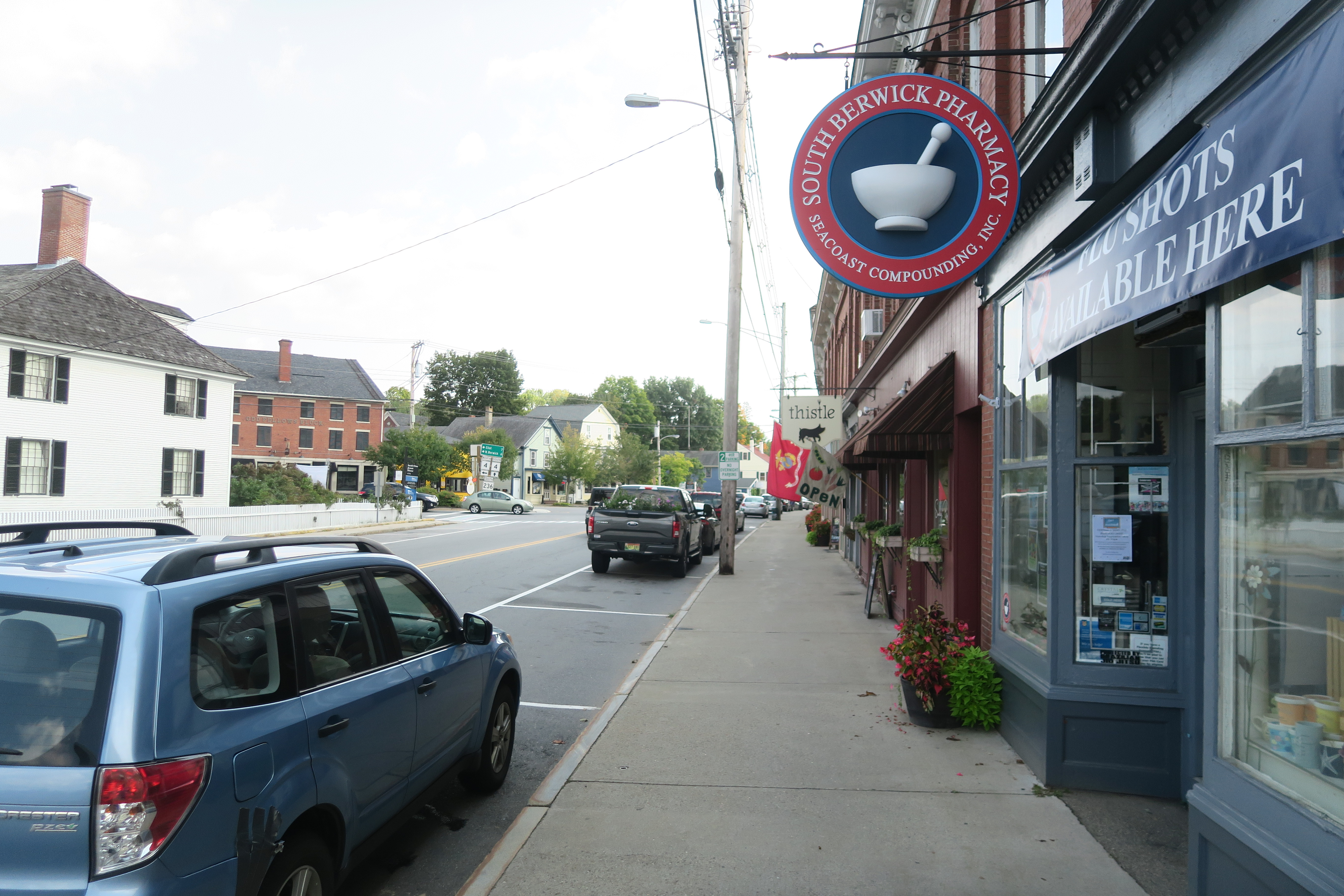
- Main Street

- Location within Maine Location within the United States
- Coordinates: 43°14′42″N 70°48′36″W
- Country: United States
- State: Maine
- County: York
- Town: South Berwick

Area
  - Total: 2.82 sq mi (7.30 km^{2})
  - Land: 2.75 sq mi (7.11 km^{2})
  - Water: 0.073 sq mi (0.19 km^{2})
- Elevation: 105 ft (32 m)

Population (2020)
  - Total: 3,825
  - Density: 1,394.0/sq mi (538.21/km^{2})
- Time zone: UTC-5 (Eastern (EST))
  - Summer (DST): UTC-4 (EDT)
- ZIP Code: 03908
- Area code: 207
- FIPS code: 23-69995
- GNIS feature ID: 2806296

South Berwick is a census-designated place (CDP) and the primary village in the town of South Berwick, York County, Maine, United States. It is in southwestern York County, in the northwestern corner of the town of South Berwick. It is bordered to the north by the town of Berwick, and to the southwest, across the Salmon Falls River, by the town of Rollinsford, New Hampshire.

Maine State Route 4 passes through the center of the village, leading north-northeast 17 miles (27 km) to Sanford, and southwest across the Salmon Falls River, where New Hampshire Route 4 continues 4 miles (6 km) to the city of Dover. State Route 236 leads northwest four miles to Berwick village and south 12 miles (19 km) to Kittery.

South Berwick was first listed as a CDP prior to the 2020 census.

== Demographics ==
Historical population
Census	Pop.	Note	%±
2020	3,825		—
U.S. Decennial Census
