= New Hampshire Route 155 =

State highway in southeastern New Hampshire, US

New Hampshire Route 155
- Map of southeastern New Hampshire with NH 155 highlighted in red

Route information
- Maintained by NHDOT
- Length: 11.259 mi (18.120 km)

Major junctions
- South end: NH 125 in Epping
- US 4 in Lee
- North end: NH 9 in Dover

Location
- Country: United States
- State: New Hampshire
- Counties: Rockingham, Strafford

Highway system
- New Hampshire Highway System; Interstate; US; State; Turnpikes
← NH 153	→ NH 156

New Hampshire Route 155 is an 11.259-mile-long (18.120 km) secondary north–south highway in southeastern New Hampshire, almost entirely within Strafford County. The highway runs from New Hampshire Route 125 in Epping to New Hampshire Route 9 in Dover.

A secondary loop of NH 155 runs into Durham, designated as New Hampshire Route 155A (see below).

== Route description ==
The southern terminus of NH 155 is in Epping at the junction with NH 125 (Calef Highway). Just 0.341 miles (0.549 km) to the north, the highway crosses the county line into Strafford County and the town of Lee, crossing NH 152 along the way. NH 155 travels through the center of Lee. A few miles later NH 155A splits off eastward into Durham while NH 155 turns northward towards Dover. Continuing north, NH 155 meets U.S. Route 4 at a half-diamond interchange, limiting access to two movements: US 4 eastbound to NH 155 and NH 155 to US 4 westbound. Access to US 4 eastbound is facilitated by nearby NH 155A, which rejoins its parent and runs east (signed south) to its own interchange with US 4. NH 155 continues north along the western edge of Durham and the eastern part of Madbury before crossing into the city of Dover. The highway continues north for another couple of miles before reaching NH 9, less than 1/4 mile (0.4 km) from the Spaulding Turnpike exit 8 interchange. The roadway continues as NH 9 eastbound towards downtown Dover.

== Major intersections ==
County	Location	mi	km	Destinations	Notes
Rockingham	Epping	0.000	0.000	NH 125 (Calef Highway) – Epping, Rochester	Southern terminus
Strafford	Lee	1.370	2.205	NH 152 (Wadleigh Falls Road) – Nottingham, Newmarket	
Strafford	Lee	5.126	8.249	NH 155A north (Mast Road) – Durham	Southern terminus of NH 155A
Strafford	Lee	6.036– 6.142	9.714– 9.885	US 4 west (Concord Road) – Northwood, Concord	Partial interchange; exit to US 4 west and entrance from US 4 east
Strafford	Lee	6.218	10.007	NH 155A south (Sherburne Road) to US 4 east – Durham, Portsmouth	Northern terminus of NH 155A
Strafford	Dover	11.259	18.120	NH 9 (Littleworth Road / Knox Marsh Road) to Spaulding Turnpike / NH 16 – Barrington, Dover	Northern terminus
1.000 mi = 1.609 km; 1.000 km = 0.621 mi: Incomplete access

== Suffixed routes ==
=== New Hampshire Route 155A ===
New Hampshire Route 155A
- Location: Lee
- Length: 3.699 mi (5.953 km)

New Hampshire Route 155A is a three-quarter loop of NH 155, running 3.699 miles (5.953 km) in the towns of Lee and Durham. It functions as a full-access point to US 4, as NH 155 intersects US 4 at a partial interchange. It is also the preferred method of accessing the University of New Hampshire Durham campus from US 4.

The southern terminus of NH 155A is in Lee at the intersection of Mast Road and Turtle Pond Road. NH 155 turns northward towards Madbury while NH 155A continues northeast on Mast Road and crosses into Durham. NH 155A runs into the western part of the UNH campus until reaching Main Street. The highway turns left on Main Street heading away from the center of campus and interchanges with US 4. NH 155A continues west, crosses back into Lee, and ends at NH 155 near the US 4 interchange.

The northern section of NH 155A in Lee is named Sherburne Road (formerly the Old Concord Turnpike).
