= New Hampshire Route 9 =

State highway in New Hampshire, United States

New Hampshire Route 9
- Map of southern New Hampshire with NH 9 highlighted in red

Route information
- Maintained by NHDOT
- Length: 109.910 mi (176.883 km)
- Existed: 1925–present

Major junctions
- West end: VT 9 at the Vermont state line near Chesterfield
- NH 10 / NH 12 / NH 101 in Keene; US 202 in Hillsborough; I-89 in Hopkinton; US 3 / US 202 in Concord; I-93 / Everett Turnpike in Concord; I-393 / US 4 / US 202 in Pembroke; US 4 / NH 43 in Northwood; US 202 in Barrington; NH 16 / Spaulding Turnpike in Dover; NH 4 / NH 108 in Dover
- East end: SR 9 at the Maine state line in Somersworth

Location
- Country: United States
- State: New Hampshire
- Counties: Cheshire, Hillsborough, Merrimack, Rockingham, Strafford

Highway system
- New Hampshire Highway System; Interstate; US; State; Turnpikes
| ← NH 4 | → NH 10 |
| ← Route 8 | N.E. | → Route 10 |

New Hampshire Route 9 (abbreviated NH 9 and also known as the Franklin Pierce Highway) is a 109.910-mile-long (176.883 km) state highway located in southern New Hampshire. It runs across the state from west to east and is a multi-state route with Vermont and Maine, part of 1920s-era New England Interstate Route 9.

The western terminus of NH 9 is at the Vermont state line in Chesterfield, where it connects to Vermont Route 9. Its eastern terminus is at the Maine state line in Somersworth, where it connects to Maine State Route 9.

Two large sections of NH 9, totaling 44.438 miles (71.516 km), are cosigned with U.S. Route 202. By combined mileage of the two sections, US 202 and NH 9 share the longest concurrency in New Hampshire.

== Route description ==
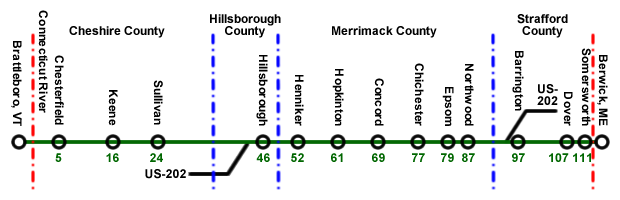
Straight-line map of NH 9 indicating the communities it passes through

=== Chesterfield to Concord ===
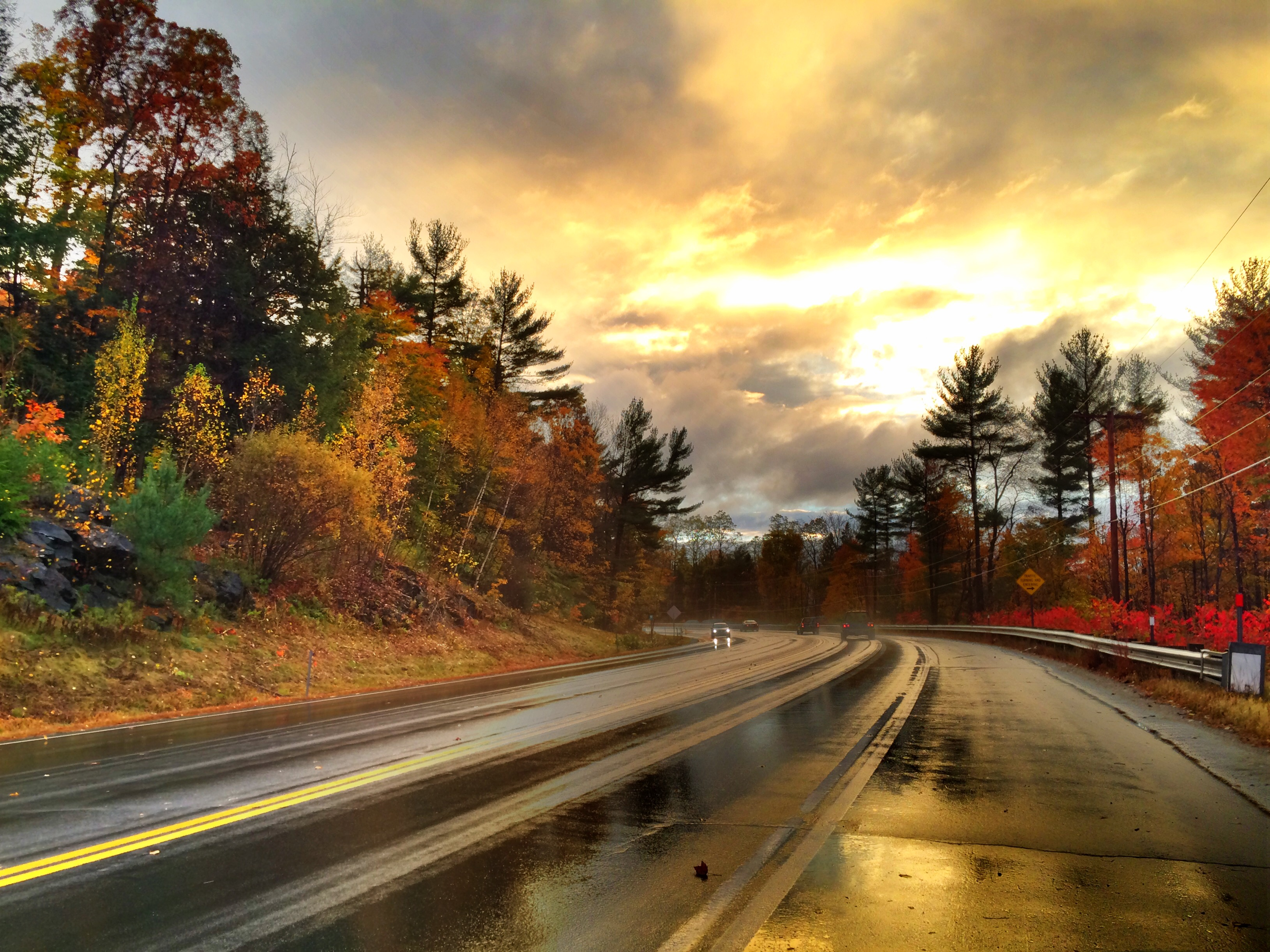
NH 9 westbound near West Chesterfield

NH 9 begins in the west where VT 9 crosses the Connecticut River from Brattleboro, Vermont, into Chesterfield, New Hampshire on the United States Navy Seabees Bridge. The highway meanders its way through the large town (by area) en route to Keene, home of Keene State College. NH 9 enters the southern part of the city and intersects with the triplex of NH 10, NH 12, and NH 101, the latter of which has its western terminus here. NH 9 joins NH 10 and NH 12, bypassing downtown Keene to the west. After about a mile, NH 12 splits off to the northwest. Two miles later, NH 10 follows suit and NH 9 continues northeast, crossing through parts of Roxbury, Sullivan, and Nelson en route to Stoddard, where NH 9 intersects with NH 123. The two routes overlap for about a mile before NH 123 splits northwest, while NH 9 continues east. The highway passes along the northern edge of Antrim, intersecting and overlapping with NH 31. The two routes cross into the town of Hillsborough, where NH 31 splits off to the northwest and NH 9 becomes a semi-limited access highway (not quite up to super-two standards due to a number of at-grade intersections). One mile (1.6 km) to the east, NH 9 interchanges with US 202 and the two routes form the first of two lengthy concurrencies. US 202 and NH 9 bypass downtown Hillsborough to the north, as well as the neighboring town of Henniker, before entering Hopkinton. US 202 and NH 9 intersect NH 127 near the town line and continue east to one of two partial interchanges with I-89. The first interchange allows the following movements: US 202/NH 9 east to I-89 south, US 202/NH 9 west to I-89 north, I-89 north to US 202/NH 9 west, and I-89 south to both directions of US 202/NH 9. The highway continues into town, intersecting the southern terminus of NH 103 (a secondary highway paralleling I-89 north) before intersecting I-89 again, with southbound-only access to the Interstate highway. US 202 and NH 9 enter the city of Concord from the west and roughly parallel I-89 until reaching downtown. The two highways intersect the northern terminus of NH 13 before meeting US 3 downtown. US 202 and NH 9 turn north onto US 3 for about six blocks before NH 9 turns east onto Loudon Road, intersecting with I-93 (US 202 continues along US 3 to meet I-393 just to the north). NH 9 runs as Loudon Road parallel to I-393 (which also carries US 4 and US 202), with access possible via NH 132 (East Side Drive) and NH 106 (Sheep Davis Road - NH 106 is also the route to New Hampshire Motor Speedway, which lies 9.5 miles (15 km) to the north). NH 9 crosses underneath I-393 and enters the extreme northern tip of Pembroke.

=== Pembroke to Somersworth ===
Upon crossing into Pembroke, I-393 ends and merges with NH 9. US 202 rejoins NH 9 at this point, as does US 4, and the triplex of routes immediately crosses into Chichester, followed by Epsom. The highway intersects with NH 28 at the Epsom Traffic Circle and continues eastward. Just feet before crossing into Northwood, NH 107 intersects with US 4, US 202, and NH 9, forming a four-route concurrency. After two miles, NH 107 splits off to the north while US 4, US 202, and NH 9 continue into Northwood. In the eastern part of town, the highway reaches an intersection with NH 43. At this intersection, US 202 and NH 9 split off US 4 towards Rochester, with US 4 continuing southeast towards Durham and Portsmouth. US 202 and NH 9 meet the western terminus of NH 202A (an alternate of US 202 toward Rochester), nick the extreme northwestern corner of Nottingham, and enter Barrington. In Barrington, US 202 and NH 9 split again; US 202 heads northeast towards Rochester, and NH 9 turns southeast, crossing NH 125 en route to Dover. NH 9 enters Dover from the southwest and intersects the northern terminus of NH 155, then turns northeast and immediately interchanges with the Spaulding Turnpike (NH 16) at exit 8. NH 9 continues into the heart of Dover as Silver Street and meets up with NH 108 (Central Avenue). NH 4 has its western terminus here. NH 9 and NH 108 traverse downtown Dover, with NH 4 splitting off towards Rollinsford along the way. The two routes split at the end of Central Avenue, north of downtown. Access to the Spaulding Turnpike exit 9 is available at this intersection NH 9 turns northeast and enters Somersworth. The road continues towards the Salmon Falls River at the heart of the city and intersects NH 236. NH 9 and NH 236 are cosigned along High and Market Streets in the downtown area. NH 9 crosses the Salmon Falls River into Berwick, Maine, and becomes Maine State Route 9. NH 236 ends at the border and is not directly connected to Maine State Route 236, but the two are linked via SR 9.

== History ==

=== New England Interstate Routes ===
Modern NH 9 was originally conceived as part of the New England Interstate system. It was first designated as New England Interstate Route 9 (NEI 9) in 1922, a designation which covered all of modern Vermont Route 9, NH 9, and Maine State Route 9 as far as Wells (SR 9 was extended in 1934), a distance of 167 miles (269 km). The New England Interstate system declined in the mid-1920s in favor of the modern U.S. Numbered Highways and all of NEI 9 was redesignated as state highways bearing the number 9. The three modern state routes now form one of the longest highways in New England to retain a single number, stretching from the New York state border in Bennington, Vermont to the Canadian border in Calais, Maine, a total distance of 447.3 miles (719.9 km).

The section of NH 9 cosigned with US 202 between Hillsborough and Henniker is part of former New England Interstate Route 32. NEI 32 was superseded in the mid-1930s by US 202 west of Henniker, and by sections of modern NH 114 and NH 103 north of Henniker. The section between Henniker and Hopkinton is concurrent with part of former New England Interstate Route 32A. NEI 32A, as originally designated, split from NEI 32 in Henniker (where modern NH 114 interchanges with US 202/NH 9) east along modern US 202/NH 9 to Hopkinton, then northwest along modern NH 103 to Mount Sunapee, then north along modern NH 103B to terminate at NEI 11 (modern NH 11).

== Junction list ==
| County | Location | mi | km | Destinations | Notes |
|---|---|---|---|---|---|
| Cheshire | Chesterfield | 0.000 | 0.000 | VT 9 west (Chesterfield Road) – Brattleboro | Continuation into Vermont |
| Cheshire | Chesterfield | 5.400 | 8.690 | NH 63 – Westmoreland, Chesterfield | |
| Cheshire | Chesterfield | 5.956 | 9.585 | NH 9A east (South Shore Road) – Spofford | Western terminus of NH 9A |
| Cheshire | Chesterfield | 8.096 | 13.029 | NH 9A west – Spofford | Eastern terminus of NH 9A |
| Cheshire | Keene | 14.394 | 23.165 | NH 10 south / NH 12 south / NH 101 east – Peterborough, Winchester | Western end of concurrency with NH 10 / NH 12; western terminus of NH 101 |
| Cheshire | Keene | 15.139 | 24.364 | West Street - Keene | Interchange |
| Cheshire | Keene | 15.594 | 25.096 | NH 12 north – Walpole | Interchange; eastern end of concurrency with NH 12 |
| Cheshire | Keene | 18.335 | 29.507 | NH 10 north – Gilsum, Newport | Eastern end of concurrency with NH 10 |
| Cheshire | Nelson | 24.901 | 40.074 | Granite Lake Road – Nelson, Harrisville | Interchange |
| Cheshire | Stoddard | 30.449 | 49.003 | NH 123 south – Hancock, Peterborough | Western end of concurrency with NH 123 |
| Cheshire | Stoddard | 31.569 | 50.805 | NH 123 north – Stoddard, Marlow | Eastern end of concurrency with NH 123 |
| Hillsborough | Antrim | 37.552 | 60.434 | NH 31 south (Clinton Road) – Antrim | Western end of concurrency with NH 31 |
| Hillsborough | Hillsborough | 41.254 | 66.392 | NH 31 north (2nd New Hampshire Turnpike) – Hillsborough Upper Village, Washington | Eastern end of concurrency with NH 31 |
| Hillsborough | Hillsborough | 43.302 | 69.688 | US 202 west (Antrim Road) to NH 149 – Hillsborough, Peterborough | Interchange; western end of concurrency with US 202 |
| Hillsborough | Hillsborough | 45.255 | 72.831 | Henniker Street to West Main Street – Hillsborough | Interchange |
| Merrimack | Henniker | 49.550 | 79.743 | NH 114 (Bradford Road/Maple Street) – Henniker, Bradford | Interchange |
| Merrimack | Hopkinton | 53.701 | 86.423 | NH 127 north (Maple Street) – West Hopkinton, Contoocook | Southern terminus of NH 127 |
| Merrimack | Hopkinton | 54.150 | 87.146 | Hatfield Road / Country Club Road | Interchange |
| Merrimack | Hopkinton | 56.939– 57.610 | 91.634– 92.714 | I-89 to I-93 (Everett Turnpike) / US 4 – Concord, Seacoast, Contoocook, Warner, Lebanon | No westbound access to I-89 south; exit 5 on I-89 |
| Merrimack | Hopkinton | 58.520 | 94.179 | NH 103 west (Hopkinton Road) – Contoocook, Warner | Eastern terminus of NH 103 |
| Merrimack | Hopkinton | 59.316 | 95.460 | I-89 south – Bow | Exit 4 on I-89 |
| Merrimack | Concord | 65.835 | 105.951 | NH 13 south (South Street) | Northern terminus of NH 13 |
| Merrimack | Concord | 65.996 | 106.210 | US 3 south (South Main Street) | Western end of concurrency with US 3 |
| Merrimack | Concord | 66.291 | 106.685 | US 3 north / US 202 east (North Main Street) | Eastern end of concurrency with US 3 / US 202 |
| Merrimack | Concord | 66.463– 66.552 | 106.962– 107.105 | I-93 (Everett Turnpike south) to I-89 north / I-393 east (US 4 / US 202) – Manchester, Lebanon, Plymouth, Portsmouth | Exit 14 on I-93 |
| Merrimack | Concord | 67.997 | 109.431 | NH 132 north (East Side Drive) | Southern terminus of NH 132 |
| Merrimack | Concord | 70.140 | 112.879 | NH 106 (Sheep Davis Road) to I-393 – Loudon, Pembroke | |
| Merrimack | Pembroke | 71.319 | 114.777 | I-393 west / US 4 west / US 202 west to I-89 north / I-93 – Concord | Eastern terminus of I-393; westbound exit and eastbound entrance; western end of concurrency with US 4/US 202 |
| Merrimack | Epsom | 76.399 | 122.952 | NH 28 (Suncook Valley Highway) – Pittsfield, Allenstown | Epsom Traffic Circle |
| Merrimack | Epsom | 80.059 | 128.842 | NH 107 south (North Road) – Deerfield, Raymond | Western end of concurrency with NH 107 |
| Rockingham | Northwood | 81.968 | 131.915 | NH 107 north (School Street) – Pittsfield | Eastern end of concurrency with NH 107 |
| Rockingham | Northwood | 87.812 | 141.320 | US 4 east (1st New Hampshire Turnpike) / NH 43 south (Mountain Avenue) – Lee, Durham, Portsmouth, Deerfield, Candia | Eastern end of concurrency with US 4; northern terminus of NH 43 |
| Rockingham | Northwood | 88.161 | 141.881 | NH 202A east (Strafford Road) – Bow Lake, Strafford | Western terminus of NH 202A |
| Strafford | Barrington | 92.768 | 149.296 | US 202 east – Rochester | Eastern end of concurrency with US 202 |
| Strafford | Barrington | 94.073 | 151.396 | NH 126 west (Church Street) – Center Strafford, Barnstead | Eastern terminus of NH 126 |
| Strafford | Barrington | 96.803 | 155.789 | NH 125 (Calef Highway) – Rochester, Epping | |
| Strafford | Dover | 102.742 | 165.347 | NH 155 south (Knox Marsh Road) – Madbury, Durham | Northern terminus of NH 155 |
| Strafford | Dover | 102.804– 103.241 | 165.447– 166.150 | NH 16 / Spaulding Turnpike – Portsmouth, Somersworth, Rochester | Exit 8 on Spaulding Turnpike |
| Strafford | Dover | 103.918 | 167.240 | NH 108 south (Central Avenue) NH 4 begins | Western end of concurrency with NH 108; western terminus of NH 4 |
| Strafford | Dover | 104.446 | 168.090 | NH 4 east (Portland Avenue) – Rollinsford | Eastern end of concurrency with NH 4 |
| Strafford | Dover | 106.620 | 171.588 | NH 108 north (New Rochester Road) to NH 16 / Spaulding Turnpike – Rochester | Eastern end of concurrency with NH 108; access to NH 16 via Indian Brook Drive |
| Strafford | Somersworth | 109.392 | 176.049 | NH 236 west (West High Street) – Rochester | Western end of concurrency with NH 236 |
| Strafford | Somersworth | 109.910 | 176.883 | SR 9 east to SR 236 south – Berwick NH 236 ends | Continuation into Maine; eastern terminus of NH 236 |
1.000 mi = 1.609 km; 1.000 km = 0.621 mi: Concurrency terminus; Incomplete access

== Suffixed routes ==
=== New Hampshire Route 9A ===
New Hampshire Route 9A
- Location: Chesterfield
- Length: 2.320 mi (3.734 km)

New Hampshire Route 9A is a 2.320-mile-long (3.734 km) secondary road in Chesterfield, not far from the Vermont border, and is the lone auxiliary route of NH 9. Signed east-west, the short highway terminates at NH 9 at both ends and provides access to Spofford Lake.

== See also ==
- List of state highways in New Hampshire
