= United States Navy Seabees Bridge =

United States Navy Seabees Bridge and Justice Harlan Fiske Stone Bridge
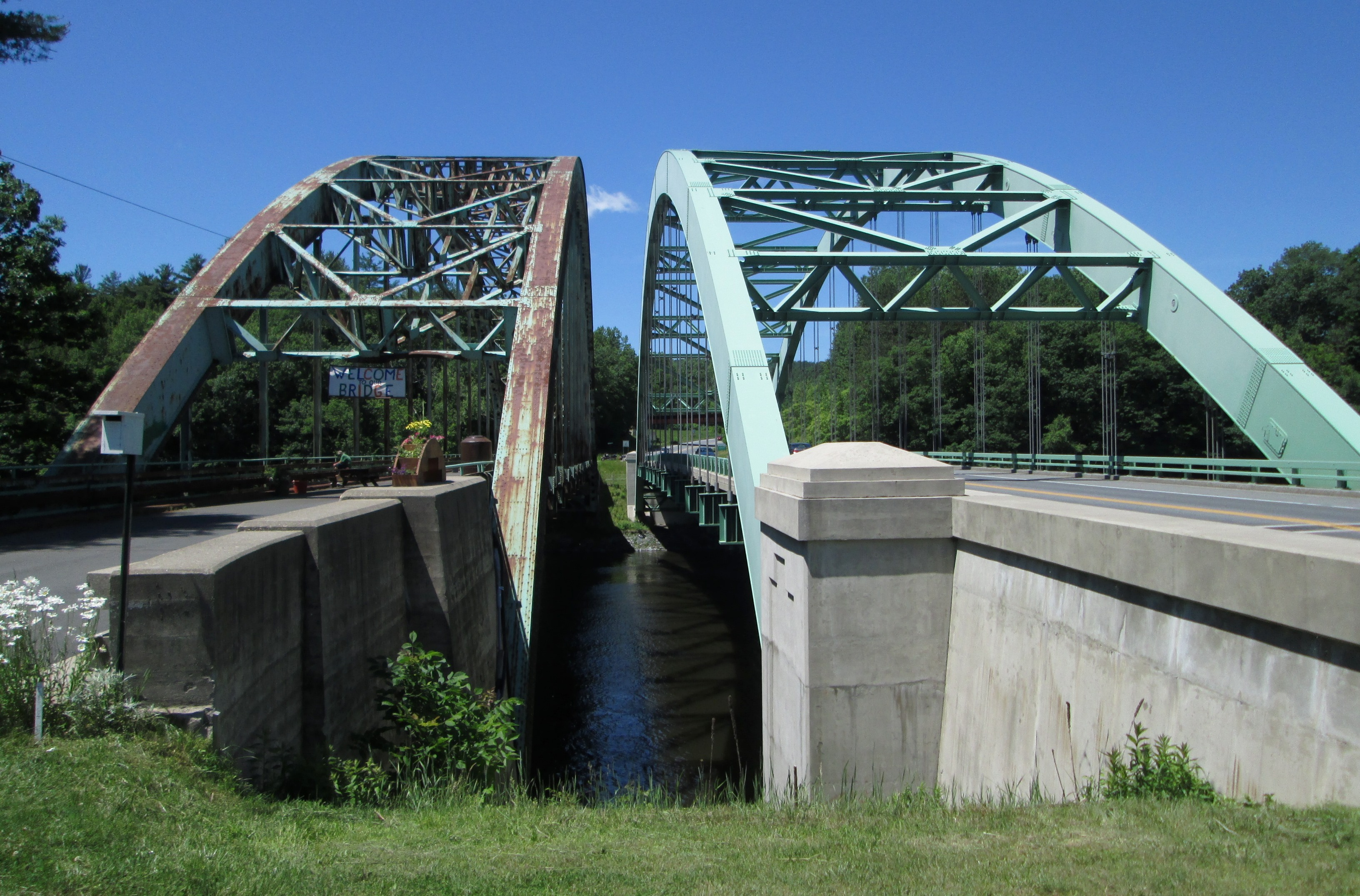
- 1937 bridge on the left, 2003 bridge on the right, from the New Hampshire side (2013)
- Coordinates: 42°53′02″N 72°33′07″W
- Carries: NH 9
- Crosses: Connecticut River
- Locale: Brattleboro, Vermont to Chesterfield, New Hampshire

Characteristics
- Design: steel two-hinged through arch bridge

History
- Opened: 1888, 1937, 2003

The United States Navy Seabees Bridge is a through-steel two-hinged arch bridge over the Connecticut River located between Brattleboro, Vermont, and Chesterfield, New Hampshire. It carries the Franklin Pierce Highway, New Hampshire Route 9, which connects to Vermont Route 9 on the Vermont side. It runs parallel to the Justice Harlan Fiske Stone Bridge which it replaced, but which has been retained as a pedestrian and bicycle bridge.

== History and construction ==
In 1888, a suspension bridge was built over the Connecticut River between Brattleboro and Chesterfield. It lasted until it was heavily damaged by a flood in March 1936. Divers have confirmed that pieces of the old bridge still lie on the riverbed under the current bridges.

In 1937, a steel arch bridge was constructed as a replacement. That same year, it received from the American Institute of Steel Construction the "Annual Award for Merit for Most Beautiful Steel Bridge, Class C".

In 2003 a new steel arch bridge was built, because of concerns about the safety of the old bridge. The new bridge was built for heavier loads. It has a wider deck, more overhead clearance, and utilizes suspender cables instead of thin suspender beams. The old bridge was retained as a pedestrian and bicycle bridge, and in 2010 was named by the State of New Hampshire for the former Chief Justice of the United States Supreme Court Harlan Fiske Stone, who was born in Chesterfield.

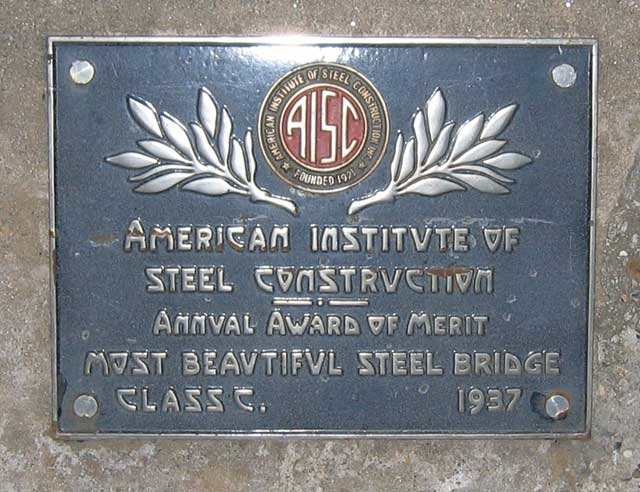
1937 bridge's award plaque

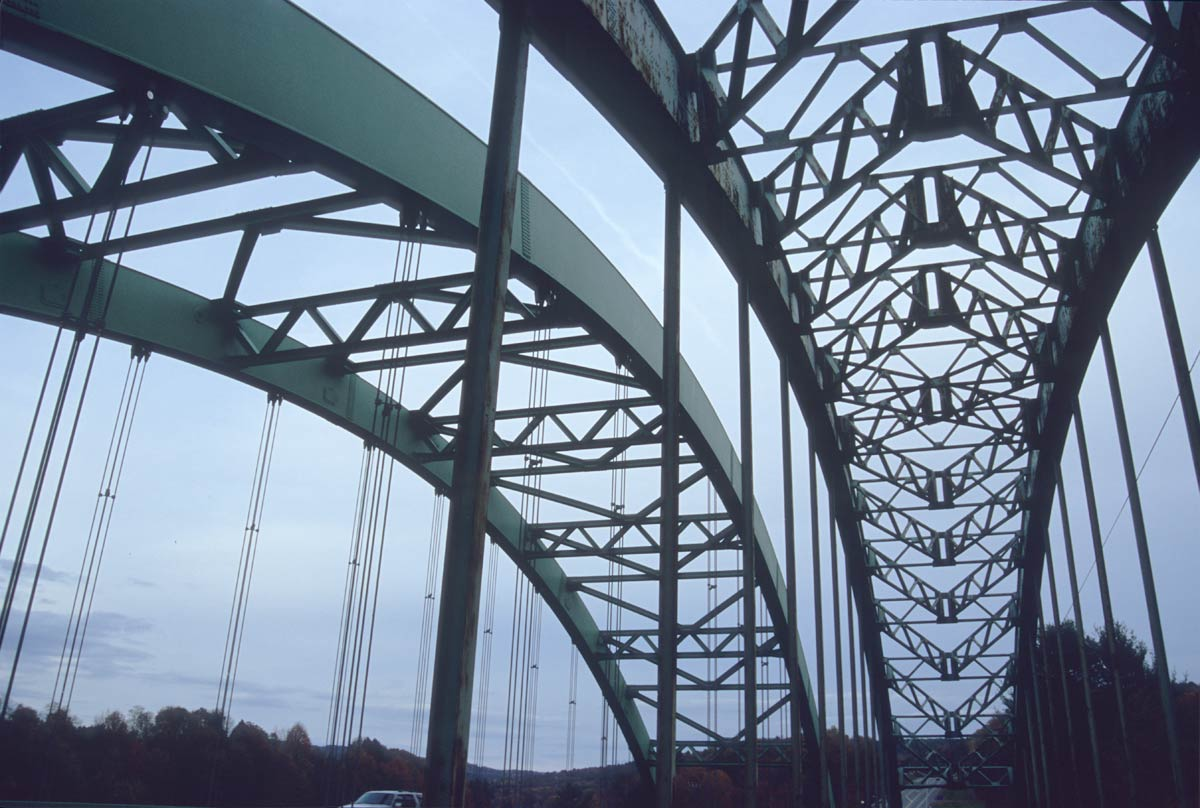
Both bridges from the road of the 1937 bridge, looking up

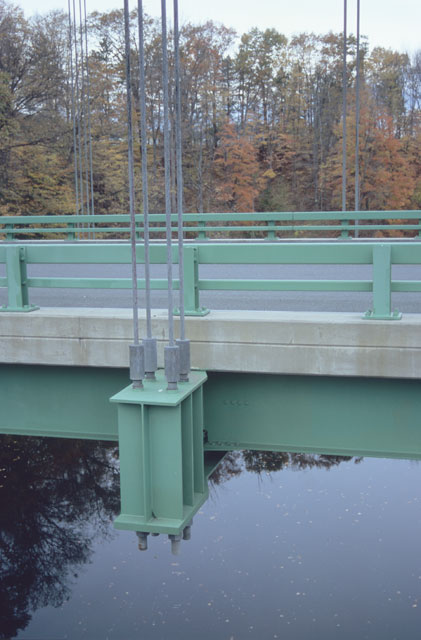
Suspender cable attach point on the 2003 bridge

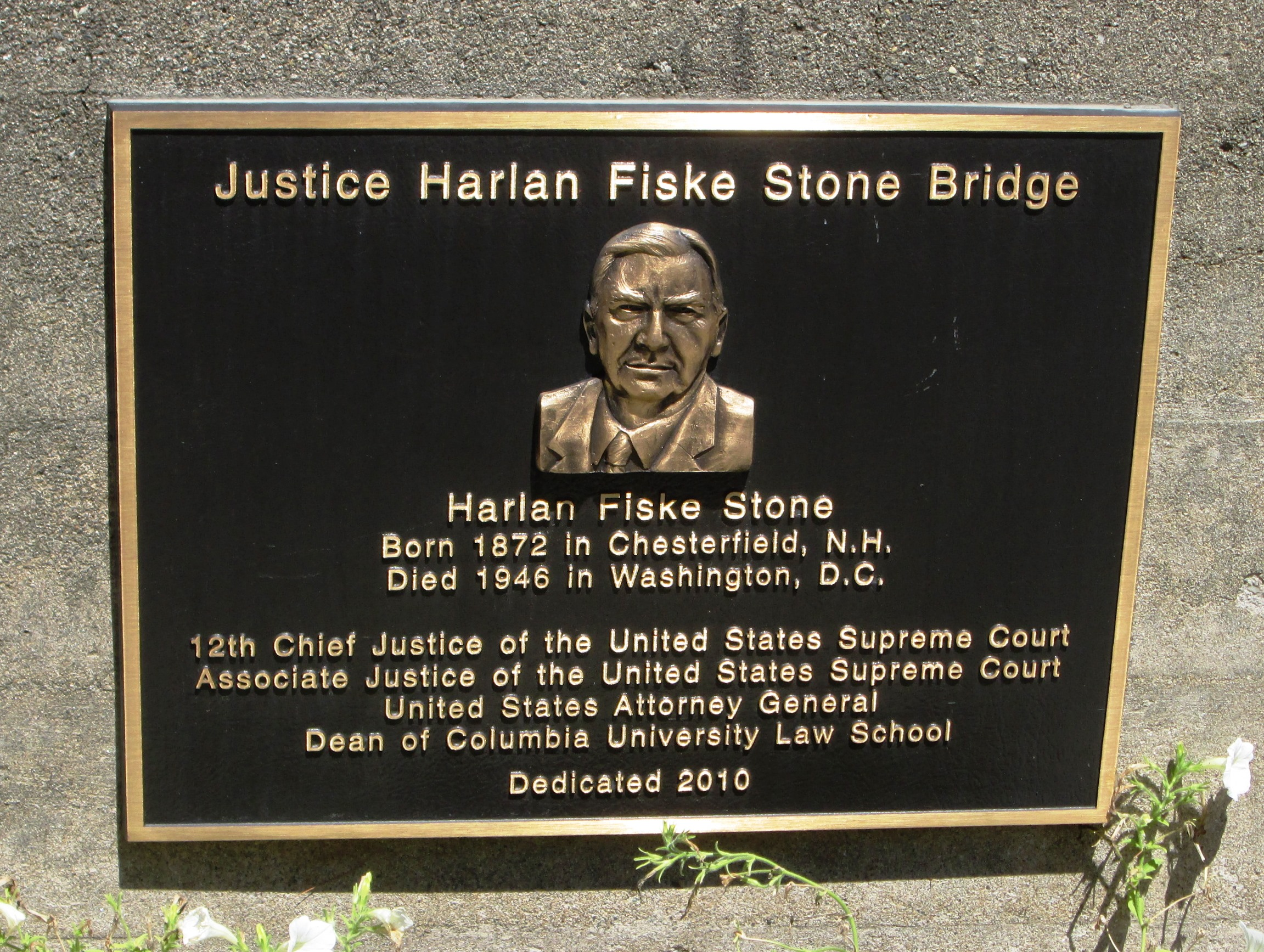
Plaque re-dedicating the old bridge

== See also ==
- List of crossings of the Connecticut River
