= Somersworth, New Hampshire =

- City
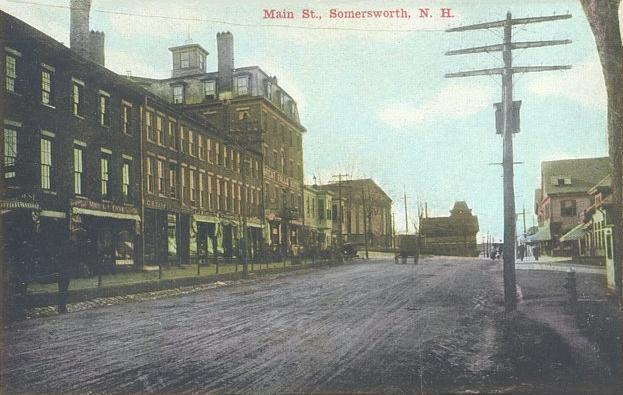
- Main Street c. 1910

- Flag Seal

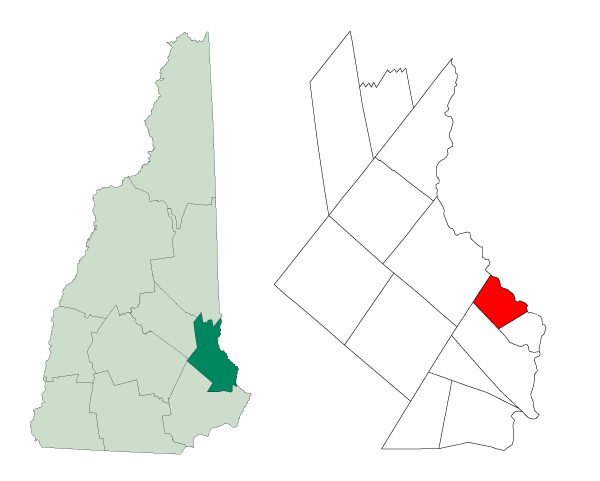
- Location in Strafford County, New Hampshire
- Coordinates: 43°14′52″N 70°52′32″W
- Country: United States
- State: New Hampshire
- County: Strafford
- Settled: before 1700
- Incorporated (town): 1754
- Incorporated (city): 1893

Area
  - Total: 10.00 sq mi (25.89 km^{2})
  - Land: 9.80 sq mi (25.39 km^{2})
  - Water: 0.20 sq mi (0.51 km^{2})
- Elevation: 207 ft (63 m)

Population (2020)
  - Total: 11,855
  - Density: 1,210/sq mi (467/km^{2})
- Time zone: UTC−5 (EST)
  - Summer (DST): UTC−4 (EDT)
- ZIP code: 03878
- Area code: 603
- FIPS code: 33-69940
- GNIS feature ID: 873721
- Website: www.somersworthnh.gov

Somersworth is a city in Strafford County, New Hampshire, United States. The population was 11,855 at the 2020 census. Somersworth has the smallest area and third-lowest population of New Hampshire's 13 cities.

== History ==
Prior to European settlement, the area that is now Somersworth was central-south Abenaki land. These Algonquian speaking peoples of the Wabanaki Confederacy lived along what they called Newichwanook, now the Salmon Falls River. Colonists from Britain arriving before 1700 named the area "Sligo", after Sligo in Ireland and settled there as a part of Dover. The community was organized in 1729 as the parish of "Summersworth", meaning "summer town", because during that season the ministers preached there. It was set off and incorporated in 1754 by colonial governor Benning Wentworth, and until 1849 included Rollinsford. A clerical error at incorporation contracted the name to "Somersworth". It was incorporated as a city in 1893, before which it was also known as "Great Falls".

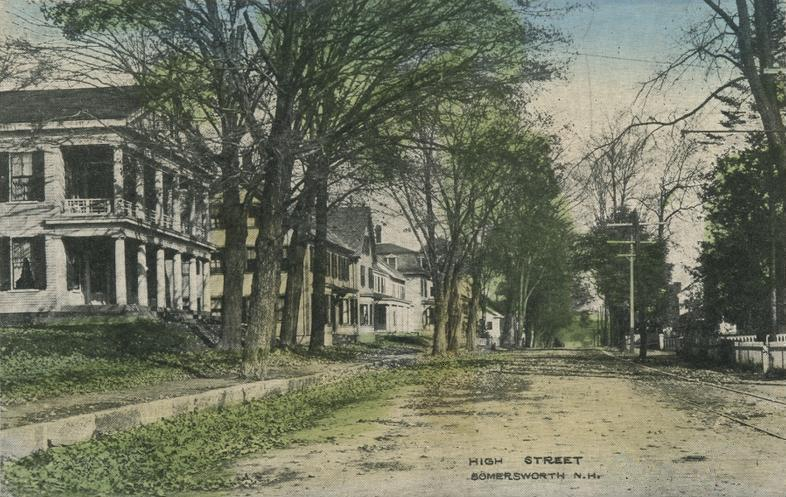
High Street, c. 1910

Situated where the Salmon Falls River drops 100 feet (30 m) over a mile, Somersworth early became a mill town, beginning with gristmills and sawmills. In 1822, the brothers Isaac and Jacob Wendell of Boston purchased for $5,000 a gristmill with its water rights at the Great Falls. They established the Great Falls Manufacturing Company, a textile business that expanded to include three mills for spinning thread and weaving cotton and woolen fabrics, specializing in "drillings, shirtings and sheetings". Throughout the 19th century, other expansive brick mill buildings, including a bleachery and dye works, were erected beside the river. The bleachery became the longest running textile operation in Somersworth. The building housed the operations that took the buff-colored fabric produced in the seven mills and transformed it into a sparkling white material that could be dyed or printed according to the buyer's wishes. The gate house at the dam directed water as needed, regulating the flow either into the river or a company canal, which itself had gates sending it under the mill. Water power turned the wheels and belts that operated mill machinery. The railroad arrived in the early 1840s, before which goods were carted to Dover.

At first, millworkers came from surrounding farms, including those in Berwick, Maine, directly across the bridge, many of whom were women. But as the need for labor grew, immigrants arrived from Ireland, and later Quebec. Brick tenement row houses were rented by the company to employee families, many of whose members worked in the mills beside their parents before passage of child labor laws. For relaxation, workers found entertainment at the Opera House or at Central Park, an amusement park beside Willand Pond. In the early 1870s, the Portsmouth, Great Falls & Conway Railroad began excursions to the White Mountains. The Electric Street Railway came in 1890, allowing trolley rides to York Beach, Maine.

In 1922, Somersworth was affected by the 1922 New England Textile Strike, shutting down the mills in the city over an attempted wage cut and hours increase.

But the New England textile industry went into decline later in the 20th century. Water power was replaced with newer forms of energy, and cotton could be manufactured where it grew, saving transportation costs. Labor was also cheaper in the South, which did not have New Hampshire's inventory tax that levied commodities like coal and cotton at the plants. The Great Depression sent many regional textile firms into bankruptcy, when some local facilities were adapted for shoemaking. The Great Falls Manufacturing Company's big mill was renovated for other uses in the 1980s, although the bleachery suffered a devastating fire in November 2003, which required assistance from 23 fire departments from New Hampshire and Maine. Aclara Technologies operates a factory (previously owned by General Electric Company) that manufactures electric meters for the energy business.

Somersworth's heyday was during the mill era. Although frequently overshadowed by the larger neighboring cities of Dover and Rochester, Somersworth retains a quantity of Victorian architecture from its prosperous age. Some antique residences, most notably within the historic district known as "The Hill", have been restored. The municipality is today largely a bedroom community for other cities and the Portsmouth Naval Shipyard. The upper end of High Street, however, continues to develop as a retail center, with several big-box chain stores.

One ship of the United States Navy was named after the city; the USS Somersworth (PCE(R)-849) was a PCE-842-class patrol craft. Commissioned in April 1944, it was named after the city in February 1956, and remained in service until decommissioned in September 1965. The ship was present at the surrender of Japan in Tokyo Bay at the end of World War II.

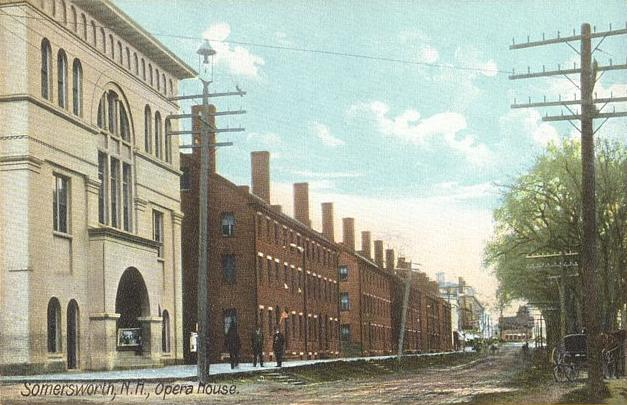
Opera House c. 1908

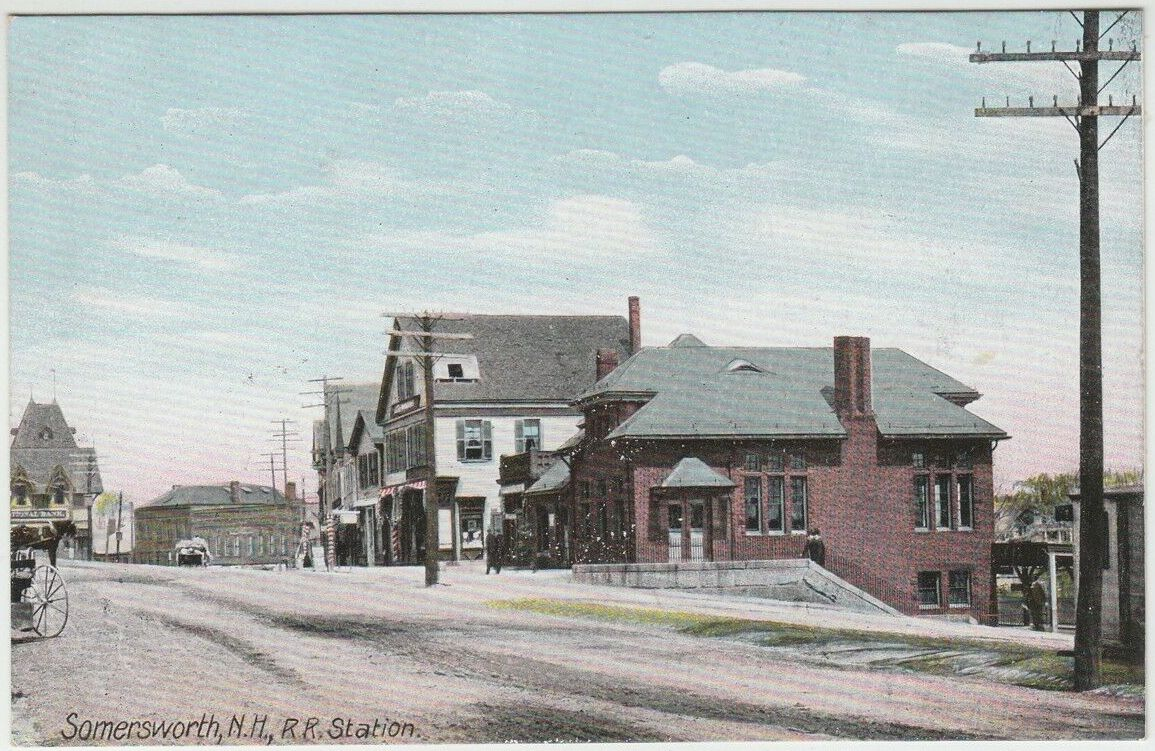
R. R. Station c. 1908

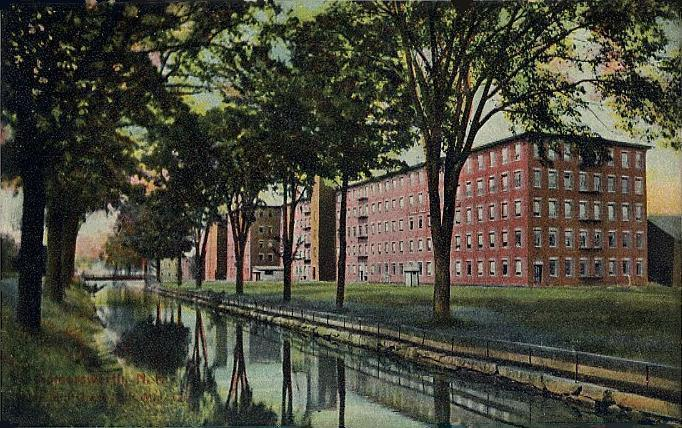
Mill No. 1 c. 1906

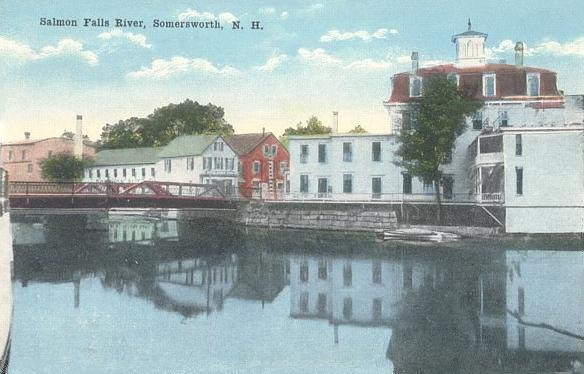
Salmon Falls River c. 1915, looking to Berwick, Maine

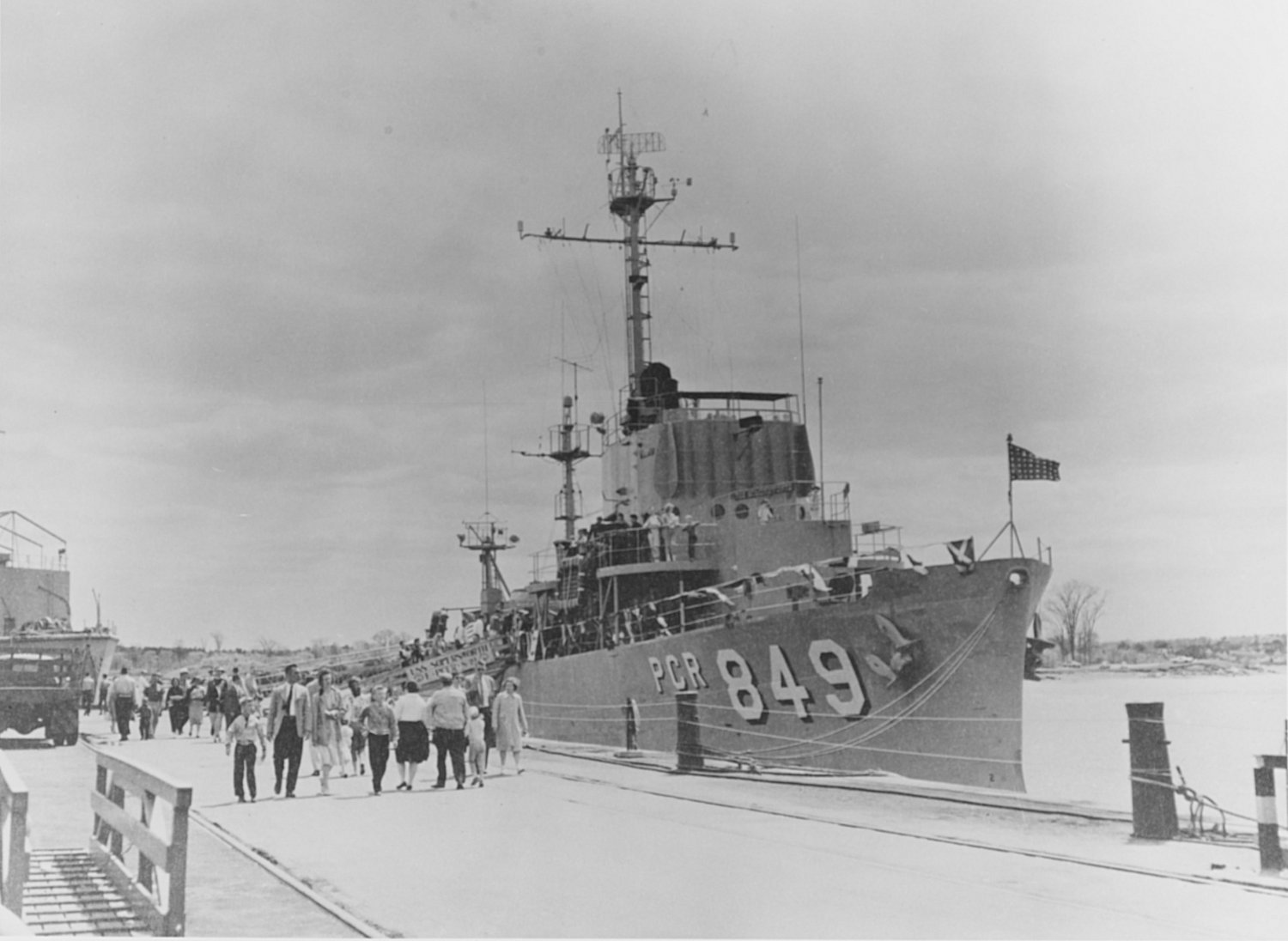
USS Somersworth c. 1960s

== Geography ==
Somersworth is located in eastern Strafford County.

According to the United States Census Bureau, the city has a total area of 10.0 square miles (25.9 km^{2}), of which 9.8 square miles (25.4 km^{2}) are land and 0.2 square miles (0.5 km^{2}) are water, comprising 1.96% of the city. Somersworth is bordered to the northeast by the Salmon Falls River, which is also the state boundary with Maine. The highest point in Somersworth is Prospect Hill rising just west of the city center, on which the city reservoir is built. The hill's elevation is approximately 310 feet (94 m) above sea level.

New Hampshire Route 9 (High Street) is the main road through the city, leading north into Berwick, Maine, and south into Dover. New Hampshire Route 108 passes through a western portion of the city, leading northwest to Rochester and south to Dover. New Hampshire Route 236 (West High Street) leads west out of downtown to NH 108.

=== Adjacent municipalities ===
- Berwick, Maine (north)
- Rollinsford (southeast)
- Dover (southwest)
- Rochester (northwest)

== Demographics ==
Historical population
Census	Pop.	Note	%±
1790	943		—
1800	932		−1.2%
1810	878		−5.8%
1820	841		−4.2%
1830	3,090		267.4%
1840	3,283		6.2%
1850	4,943		50.6%
1860	4,787		−3.2%
1870	4,504		−5.9%
1880	5,586		24.0%
1890	6,207		11.1%
1900	7,023		13.1%
1910	6,704		−4.5%
1920	6,688		−0.2%
1930	5,680		−15.1%
1940	6,136		8.0%
1950	6,927		12.9%
1960	8,529		23.1%
1970	9,026		5.8%
1980	10,350		14.7%
1990	11,249		8.7%
2000	11,477		2.0%
2010	11,766		2.5%
2020	11,855		0.8%
U.S. Decennial Census

=== 2020 census ===
As of the 2020 census, Somersworth had a population of 11,855. The median age was 39.4 years. 19.4% of residents were under the age of 18 and 15.0% of residents were 65 years of age or older. For every 100 females there were 97.3 males, and for every 100 females age 18 and over there were 96.0 males age 18 and over.

98.3% of residents lived in urban areas, while 1.7% lived in rural areas.

There were 5,082 households in Somersworth, of which 26.5% had children under the age of 18 living in them. Of all households, 41.4% were married-couple households, 21.0% were households with a male householder and no spouse or partner present, and 27.0% were households with a female householder and no spouse or partner present. About 29.3% of all households were made up of individuals and 10.5% had someone living alone who was 65 years of age or older.

There were 5,325 housing units, of which 243 were vacant (4.6%). The homeowner vacancy rate was 0.9% and the rental vacancy rate was 4.8%.

Racial composition as of the 2020 census
Race	Number	Percent
White	9,753	82.3%
Black or African American	212	1.8%
American Indian and Alaska Native	31	0.3%
Asian	871	7.3%
Native Hawaiian and Other Pacific Islander	6	0.1%
Some other race	254	2.1%
Two or more races	728	6.1%
Hispanic or Latino (of any race)	509	4.3%

=== 2010 census ===
As of the census of 2010, there were 11,766 people, 4,862 households, and 3,044 families residing in the city. There were 5,199 housing units, of which 337, or 6.5%, were vacant. The racial makeup of the city was 89.4% white, 1.4% African American, 0.3% Native American, 5.3% Asian, 0.02% Pacific Islander, 0.9% some other race, and 2.6% from two or more races. 2.5% of the population were Hispanic or Latino of any race.

Of the 4,862 households in the city, 31.6% had children under the age of 18 living with them, 43.9% were headed by married couples living together, 13.5% had a female householder with no husband present, and 37.4% were non-families. 28.5% of all households were made up of individuals, and 10.2% were someone living alone who was 65 years of age or older. The average household size was 2.42, and the average family size was 2.95.

23.2% of residents in the city were under the age of 18, 8.1% were from age 18 to 24, 29.2% were from 25 to 44, 27.7% were from 45 to 64, and 11.8% were 65 years of age or older. The median age was 37.8 years. For every 100 females, there were 91.3 males. For every 100 females age 18 and over, there were 89.3 males.

=== Income and poverty ===
For the period 2011–2015, the estimated median annual income for a household was $54,868, and the median income for a family was $66,086. Male full-time workers had a median income of $47,865 versus $36,935 for females. The per capita income for the city was $25,527. 13.6% of the population and 10.2% of families were below the poverty line, along with 20.0% of people under the age of 18 and 6.9% of people 65 or older.

== Education ==
The Somersworth School District consists of Somersworth High School (grades 9–12), Somersworth Middle School (grades 6–8), and two elementary schools, Idlehurst Elementary School and Maple Wood Elementary School.

Somersworth's first high school (pictured above) opened in 1850 and was located at 17 Grand Street. Hilltop School, built at the same location in 1927, replaced the original high school. Later it would be converted to an elementary school.

In 1999, after numerous fire code violations were identified with the Hilltop School by the New Hampshire State Fire Marshal, the City of Somersworth was granted waivers for a period of three years to address the state's concerns. Despite the failure of the school district to address the numerous code violations during the probation period, the waivers continued to be extended past their originally intended three-year period. In August 2007, the upper floors of the school were closed by the New Hampshire State Fire Marshall after the city neglected to fix code violations they were warned about in November 2006.

The closure of the upper floors came just weeks before neighborhood students were scheduled to return from summer vacation. This resulted in the start of school being delayed by over two weeks for Hilltop students. Three portable classrooms were brought in for "2 years" in 2007. Students were still occupying the three portable classrooms surpassing the time allotted as of August 18, 2010.

In the spring of 2007, the Somersworth School Board voted to build a new school to replace Hilltop. On February 17, 2009, the Somersworth City Council voted to approve bonding in the amount of $19.9 million for the construction of a new elementary school. The new school has been named Idlehurst, and has been functioning in the SAU 56 school system as of the start of the 2011–2012 school year.

In May 2019, Somersworth Middle School was awarded 2019 Middle School of the Year by the New Hampshire Department of Education. The middle school, led by Principal Dana Hilliard, was awarded this award for excellence in education for its ability to engage students and support their social and emotional growth.

== Notable people ==
- Fred H. Brown (1879–1955), US senator, 59th governor of New Hampshire
- Stuart Chase (1888–1985), economist, engineer
- John Alfred Hayes (1839–1913), Civil War surgeon, officer
- Edward H. Rollins (1824–1889), businessman, politician
- John Sullivan (1740–1795), Continental Army major general
- John Wentworth Jr. (1745–1787), served as a New Hampshire delegate to the Continental Congress
- Hopley Yeaton (1739–1812), first commissioned officer of the Revenue Cutter Service

== Sites of interest ==
- Summersworth Historical Society and Museum (157 Main Street)
- Somersworth Historic District
- Noble Pines
- Somersworth River Walk

== Transportation ==
Public transportation is provided by the Cooperative Alliance for Seacoast Transportation.
