= Madbury, New Hampshire =

- Town
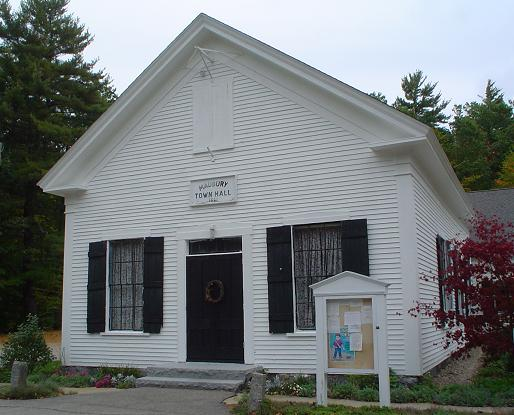
- Town Hall

- Flag Seal

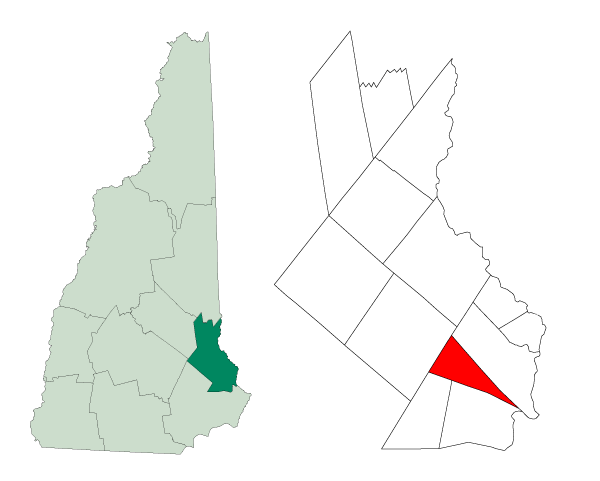
- Location within Strafford County, New Hampshire
- Coordinates: 43°10′09″N 70°55′26″W
- Country: United States
- State: New Hampshire
- County: Strafford
- Settled: 1699
- Incorporated: 1775

Area
  - Total: 12.2 sq mi (31.6 km^{2})
  - Land: 11.6 sq mi (30.1 km^{2})
  - Water: 0.58 sq mi (1.5 km^{2})
- Elevation: 184 ft (56 m)

Population (2020)
  - Total: 1,918
  - Density: 165/sq mi (63.7/km^{2})
- Time zone: UTC-5 (EST)
  - Summer (DST): UTC-4 (EDT)
- ZIP code: 03823
- Area code: 603
- FIPS code: 33-44820
- GNIS feature ID: 873656
- Website: www.madbury.gov

Madbury is a town in Strafford County, New Hampshire, United States. The population was 1,918 at the 2020 census.

== History ==
Madbury was originally a part of Dover called "Barbadoes", after the West Indies island of Barbados with which settlers conducted trade, sending wood and lumber in exchange for sugar, molasses, slaves and other commodities. The name survives at Barbadoes Pond. Garrison houses were built as protection against the Native Americans. Later it was part of Durham, a Dover parish which organized in 1716 and then incorporated in 1735. Madbury was once the farm of Sir Francis Champernowne of Greenland, and named after his ancient family's mansion at Modbury in Devon, England.

The name Madbury Parish was first recorded in a 1755 grant made by colonial governor Benning Wentworth, with full town privileges granted in 1768 by his successor, Governor John Wentworth. A lumbering and farming community, Madbury was incorporated in 1775. Jackson in Carroll County was first settled in 1778 as "New Madbury" by residents of the town. Today, Madbury is residential, its inhabitants generally employed elsewhere. Numerous faculty of the nearby University of New Hampshire reside here.

== Geography ==
The town of Madbury is shaped like a wedge, extending from the southeastern tip of the town touching Cedar Point on Little Bay to the town's border with Barrington to the northwest. According to the United States Census Bureau, the town has a total area of 12.2 square miles (31.6 km^{2}), of which 11.6 square miles (30.1 km^{2}) are land and 0.58 square miles (1.5 km^{2}) are water, comprising 4.65% of the town. The highest point of land is the summit of Hicks Hill, at 331 feet (101 m) above sea level, located close to the center of town.

Although a branch of the Oyster River rises in western Madbury, the Bellamy River is the only river of size in town. Bellamy Reservoir, fed by the Bellamy River together with Mallego Brook, covers 382 acres (1.5 km^{2}) and provides 60% of the water supply for Portsmouth. It was created in 1960 with a dam built by the Army Corps of Engineers.

=== Adjacent municipalities ===
- Dover (northeast)
- Durham (south)
- Lee (southwest)
- Barrington (west)

== Transportation ==
Madbury is served by state routes 9, 108 and 155.

The Western Mainline of Pan Am Railways (CSX Transportation as of 2022), which runs north–south through the center of Madbury, reached the town between 1840 and 1843. At one point Madbury had its own passenger station and depot, built in 1881 and extant until at least 1993. The station building was located near Route 155 and the W. H. Elliot Rose Greenhouses, which were constructed in 1901. The Elliot greenhouses provided many jobs, especially at the nearby railroad depot. Glass and greenhouse supplies, in addition to several carloads of coal, came to the Madbury Station each week. Roses were shipped to destinations throughout the northeast United States.

== Demographics ==
Historical population
| Census | Pop. | Note | %± |
|---|---|---|---|
| 1790 | 592 | | — |
| 1800 | 544 | | −8.1% |
| 1810 | 582 | | 7.0% |
| 1820 | 559 | | −4.0% |
| 1830 | 510 | | −8.8% |
| 1840 | 489 | | −4.1% |
| 1850 | 483 | | −1.2% |
| 1860 | 496 | | 2.7% |
| 1870 | 408 | | −17.7% |
| 1880 | 397 | | −2.7% |
| 1890 | 367 | | −7.6% |
| 1900 | 336 | | −8.4% |
| 1910 | 331 | | −1.5% |
| 1920 | 326 | | −1.5% |
| 1930 | 358 | | 9.8% |
| 1940 | 401 | | 12.0% |
| 1950 | 489 | | 21.9% |
| 1960 | 556 | | 13.7% |
| 1970 | 704 | | 26.6% |
| 1980 | 987 | | 40.2% |
| 1990 | 1,404 | | 42.2% |
| 2000 | 1,509 | | 7.5% |
| 2010 | 1,771 | | 17.4% |
| 2020 | 1,918 | | 8.3% |
U.S. Decennial Census

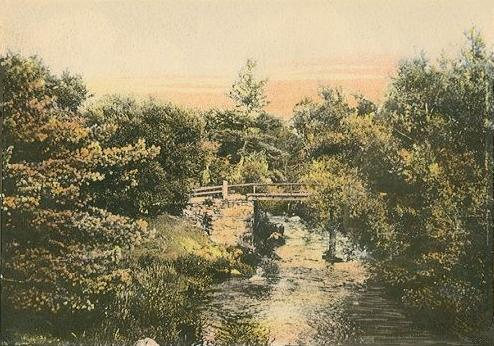
Mill Hill Road Bridge c. 1905

As of the census of 2000, there were 1,509 people, 534 households, and 411 families residing in the town. The population density was 129.2 inhabitants per square mile (49.9/km^{2}). There were 543 housing units at an average density of 46.5 per square mile (18.0/km^{2}). The racial makeup of the town was 96.62% White, 0.40% African American, 0.27% Native American, 1.26% Asian, 0.40% from other races, and 1.06% from two or more races. Hispanic or Latino of any race were 0.46% of the population.

There were 534 households, out of which 42.3% had children under the age of 18 living with them, 63.1% were married couples living together, 9.6% had a female householder with no husband present, and 23.0% were non-families. 15.0% of all households were made up of individuals, and 5.2% had someone living alone who was 65 years of age or older. The average household size was 2.83 and the average family size was 3.13.

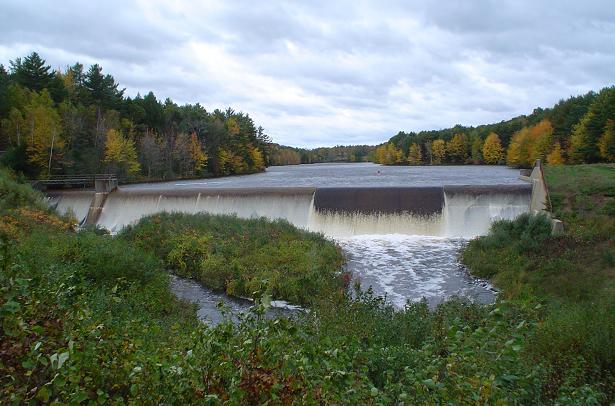
Dam at the Bellamy Reservoir

In the town, the population was spread out, with 30.0% under the age of 18, 6.4% from 18 to 24, 32.3% from 25 to 44, 23.7% from 45 to 64, and 7.6% who were 65 years of age or older. The median age was 36 years. For every 100 females, there were 99.6 males. For every 100 females age 18 and over, there were 97.2 males.

The median income for a household in the town was $57,981, and the median income for a family was $67,981. Males had a median income of $47,969 versus $30,000 for females. The per capita income for the town was $26,524. About 3.9% of families and 5.8% of the population were below the poverty line, including 4.1% of those under age 18 and 3.4% of those age 65 or over.

== Schools ==
Madbury is part of the Oyster River Cooperative School District, along with the towns of Durham and Lee. One of the two elementary schools in the district, Moharimet Elementary School, is located in Madbury on Route 155. It was named after a 17th-century Native American chief from the region.

== Madbury Day ==
Madbury Day was traditionally celebrated the second Saturday in June. After taking two years off during COVID (in 2020 and 2021), it returned in 2022 to now be held on the Saturday after Labor Day. Main activities include the parade, community yard sale, BBQ, and face-painting. The parade begins at 12pm at the intersection of Cherry Lane and Town Hall Road, making its way towards the Town Hall. Participants of the parade typically include antique cars, fire engines, the Oyster River Middle School Jazz Band, clowns on unicycles, women of the Madbury Community Club, and adolescents on bicycles.

== Notable person ==
- Jeanne Shaheen, U.S. senator; former governor of New Hampshire and state senator
