= Northwood, New Hampshire =

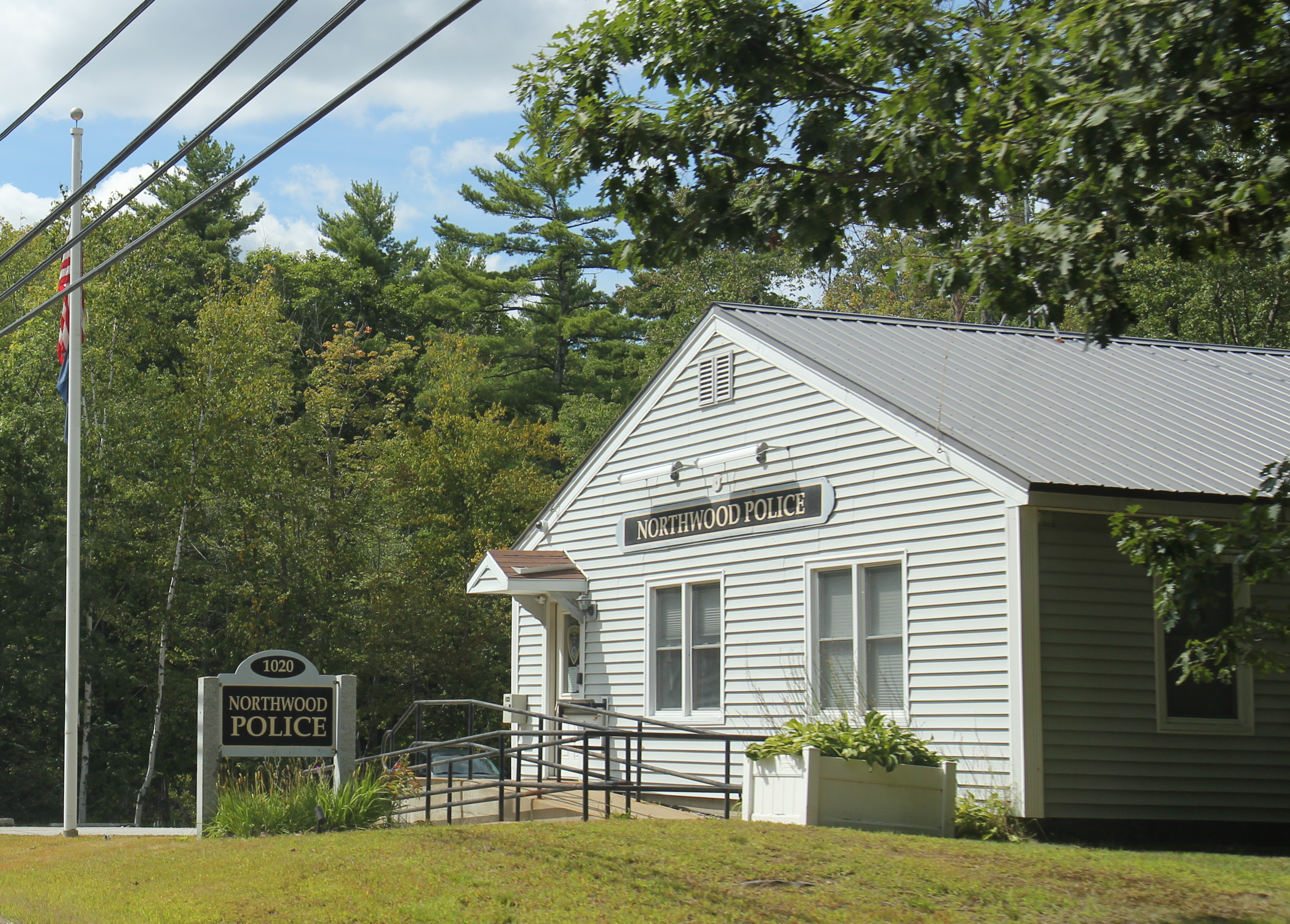
- Northwood Police Station

- Seal

- Location in Rockingham County and the state of New Hampshire
- Coordinates: 43°12′48″N 71°12′35″W
- Country: United States
- State: New Hampshire
- County: Rockingham
- Incorporated: 1773
- Villages: Northwood; Northwood Center; Northwood Narrows; Northwood Ridge

Area
  - Total: 30.2 sq mi (78.3 km^{2})
  - Land: 28.1 sq mi (72.9 km^{2})
  - Water: 2.1 sq mi (5.4 km^{2}) 6.92%
- Elevation: 614 ft (187 m)

Population (2020)
  - Total: 4,641
  - Density: 165/sq mi (63.6/km^{2})
- Time zone: UTC-5 (Eastern)
  - Summer (DST): UTC-4 (Eastern)
- ZIP code: 03261
- Area code: 603
- FIPS code: 33-56820
- GNIS feature ID: 873689
- Website: www.northwoodnh.org

Northwood is a town in Rockingham County, New Hampshire, United States. The population was 4,641 at the 2020 census.

== History ==
First settled in 1763, Northwood was incorporated on February 6, 1773, by colonial governor John Wentworth, when a large tract of land called "North Woods" was separated from Nottingham. Around 1800, the Portsmouth to Concord Turnpike was built, and the town began to prosper. Numerous taverns accommodated sledge and stage passengers. At one time, there were some twelve sawmills in the town, five of which were replaced by shoe factories during the latter half of the 19th century. By 1920, however, the last shoe factory had closed. More recently, the town has been a popular vacation spot, being home to nine lakes and many antique shops.

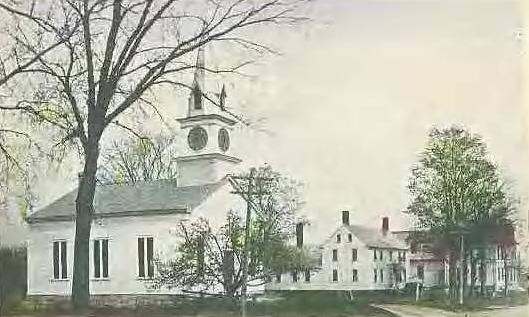
East Northwood c. 1910

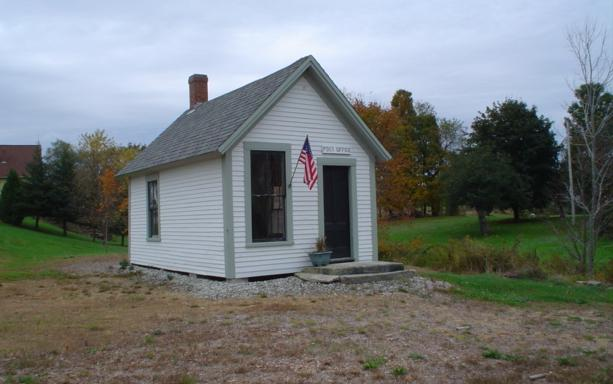
Old post office

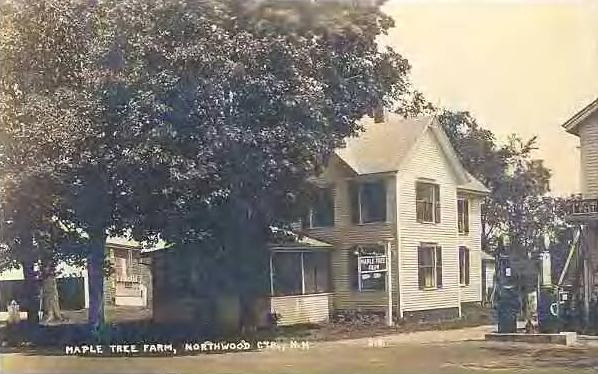
Maple Tree Farm, 1912

== Geography ==
According to the United States Census Bureau, the town has a total area of 30.2 square miles (78.3 km^{2}), of which 28.1 square miles (72.9 km^{2}) are land and 2.1 square miles (5.4 km^{2}) are water, comprising 6.92% of the town. Northwood is well known for its lakes, with both seasonal and year-round residences. The larger lakes and ponds include Bow Lake, which drains to the east via the Isinglass River and is part of the Piscataqua River drainage basin, and Northwood Lake, Pleasant Lake, Jenness Pond, Harvey Lake, and Long Pond, all of which drain west to the Suncook River, a tributary of the Merrimack River. Meadow Lake near the center of Northwood is at the headwaters of the south-flowing Lamprey River, part of the Piscataqua River watershed, and the east side of town contains the headwaters of the Bean River and North River, tributaries of the Lamprey. The highest point in Northwood is Saddleback Mountain, at 1,150 feet (350 m) above sea level near the town's southern border.

The climate of Northwood is a temperate, humid continental climate, with warm summers and cold, snowy winters.

== Demographics ==
Historical population
Census	Pop.	Note	%±
1790	744		—
1800	950		27.7%
1810	1,095		15.3%
1820	1,260		15.1%
1830	1,342		6.5%
1840	1,182		−11.9%
1850	1,308		10.7%
1860	1,502		14.8%
1870	1,430		−4.8%
1880	1,345		−5.9%
1890	1,478		9.9%
1900	1,304		−11.8%
1910	1,059		−18.8%
1920	891		−15.9%
1930	872		−2.1%
1940	873		0.1%
1950	966		10.7%
1960	1,034		7.0%
1970	1,526		47.6%
1980	2,175		42.5%
1990	3,124		43.6%
2000	3,640		16.5%
2010	4,241		16.5%
2020	4,641		9.4%
U.S. Decennial Census

As of the census of 2000, there were 3,640 people, 1,347 households, and 1,000 families residing in the town. The population density was 130.1 inhabitants per square mile (50.2/km^{2}). There were 1,905 housing units at an average density of 68.1 per square mile (26.3/km^{2}). The racial makeup of the town was 97.53% White, 0.30% African American, 0.30% Native American, 0.66% Asian, 0.14% Pacific Islander, 0.19% from other races, and 0.88% from two or more races. Hispanic or Latino of any race were 0.55% of the population.

There were 1,347 households, out of which 36.7% had children under the age of 18 living with them, 62.0% were married couples living together, 7.7% had a female householder with no husband present, and 25.7% were non-families. 18.0% of all households were made up of individuals, and 5.1% had someone living alone who was 65 years of age or older. The average household size was 2.70 and the average family size was 3.07.

In the town, the population was spread out, with 27.1% under the age of 18, 6.6% from 18 to 24, 32.1% from 25 to 44, 25.2% from 45 to 64, and 9.0% who were 65 years of age or older. The median age was 37 years. For every 100 females, there were 100.3 males. For every 100 females age 18 and over, there were 99.3 males.

The median income for a household in the town was $50,675, and the median income for a family was $53,953. Males had a median income of $36,161 versus $27,721 for females. The per capita income for the town was $21,491. About 1.5% of families and 4.2% of the population were below the poverty line, including 3.0% of those under age 18 and 3.0% of those age 65 or over.

== Arts and culture ==
Four Northwood districts along Route 4 are considered historic sections of town. They are, from east to west, East Northwood, Northwood Ridge, Northwood Center and Northwood Narrows.

== Parks and recreation ==
Northwood is home to Camp Yavneh, a Jewish summer camp founded in 1944 on Lucas Pond, and Wah-Tut-Ca Scout Reservation, a Boy Scout Camp run by the Spirit of Adventure Council.

== Education ==
The town is home to Coe-Brown Northwood Academy, founded in 1867.

== Infrastructure ==
Highways include:

- New Hampshire Route 9
- U.S. Route 4
- U.S. Route 202
- NH 43
- NH 107
- NH 202A
- NH 152

== Notable people ==
- John Lauris Blake (1788–1857), clergyman and bestselling author; born in Northwood
- Albert O. Brown (1852–1937), politician, 58th governor of New Hampshire; born in Northwood
- William Burleigh (1785–1827), member of Congress, representing Maine; born in Northwood
- Ella Knowles Haskell (1860–1911), lawyer, suffragist, and politician; born in Northwood
- Hall J. Kelley (1790–1874), settler and writer; born in Northwood
- Bert Weeden (1882–1939), professional baseball player; born and died in Northwood
