= Berwick (CDP), Maine =

Berwick, Maine
- Census-designated place
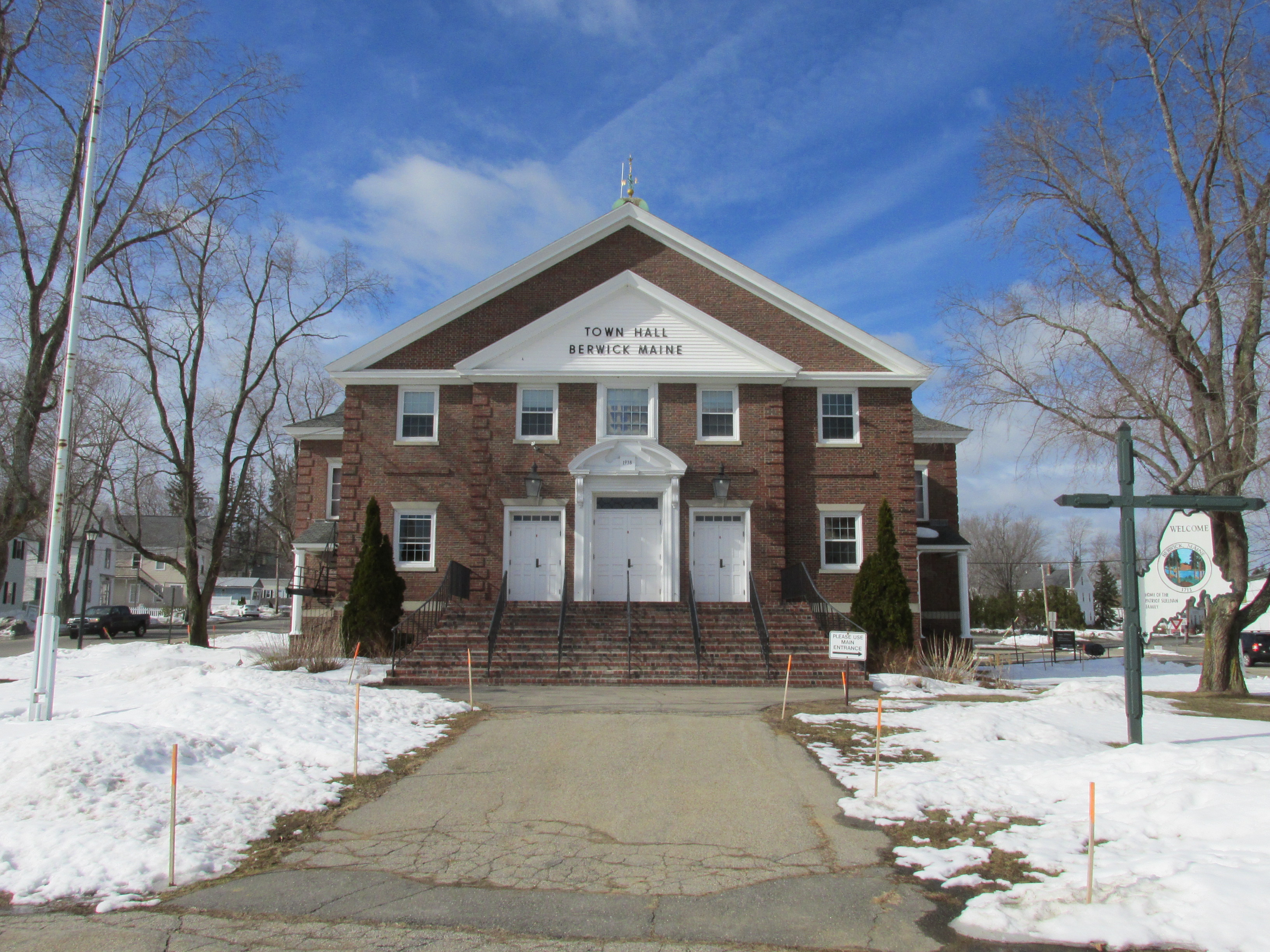
- Town Hall

- Location within Maine Location within the United States
- Coordinates: 43°16′18″N 70°52′26″W
- Country: United States
- State: Maine
- County: York

Area
  - Total: 1.60 sq mi (4.15 km^{2})
  - Land: 1.57 sq mi (4.07 km^{2})
  - Water: 0.031 sq mi (0.08 km^{2})
- Elevation: 190 ft (58 m)

Population (2020)
  - Total: 2,277
  - Density: 1,447.9/sq mi (559.02/km^{2})
- Time zone: UTC-5 (Eastern (EST))
  - Summer (DST): UTC-4 (EDT)
- ZIP code: 03901
- Area code: 207
- FIPS code: 23-04685
- GNIS feature ID: 2377889

Berwick is a census-designated place (CDP) in the town of Berwick in York County, Maine, United States. The population was 2,187 at the 2010 census, out of a total of 7,246 in the entire town. It is part of the Portland–South Portland–Biddeford, Maine Metropolitan Statistical Area.

== Geography ==
According to the United States Census Bureau, the CDP has a total area of 1.60 square miles (4.14 km^{2}), of which 1.57 square miles (4.07 km^{2}) is land and 0.027 square miles (0.07 km^{2}), or 1.77%, is water.

== Demographics ==
Historical population
Census	Pop.	Note	%±
2020	2,277		—
U.S. Decennial Census

As of the census of 2000, there were 1,993 people, 776 households, and 506 families residing in the CDP. The population density was 1,301.7 inhabitants per square mile (502.6/km^{2}). There were 806 housing units at an average density of 526.4 per square mile (203.2/km^{2}). The racial makeup of the CDP was 96.24% White, 0.85% Black or African American, 0.25% Native American, 1.10% Asian, 0.05% Pacific Islander, 0.10% from other races, and 1.40% from two or more races. Hispanic or Latino of any race were 0.75% of the population.

There were 776 households, out of which 36.9% had children under the age of 18 living with them, 43.4% were married couples living together, 17.5% had a female householder with no husband present, and 34.7% were non-families. 27.1% of all households were made up of individuals, and 9.4% had someone living alone who was 65 years of age or older. The average household size was 2.52 and the average family size was 3.05.

In the CDP, the population was spread out, with 28.3% under the age of 18, 8.8% from 18 to 24, 32.4% from 25 to 44, 19.0% from 45 to 64, and 11.5% who were 65 years of age or older. The median age was 34 years. For every 100 females, there were 91.1 males. For every 100 females age 18 and over, there were 87.0 males.

The median income for a household in the CDP was $30,294, and the median income for a family was $41,985. Males had a median income of $38,050 versus $23,450 for females. The per capita income for the CDP was $16,822. About 17.4% of families and 17.5% of the population were below the poverty line, including 23.2% of those under age 18 and 16.9% of those age 65 or over.

== Early history ==
Ambrose Gibbens was the first white settler in Berwick, circa 1630. He made a settlement and established a trading post at Newichawannok (Old Berwick) near Quampeagan Falls, the head of navigation on the Piscataqua. The region hosted numerous pine trees and was one of the attractions to early settlers. As such, the first sawmill in America—called Gibbens' Sawmill—was set up at Newichawannok, on the Great Works River. That one sawmill quickly grew to 18 and the Native Americans called it "the place of great works".

The area soon grew into a bustling community of more than 200 people. By 1647, the settlements at Kittery had become the first town in Maine. Old Kittery included what is now Eliot, South Berwick, and Berwick. Newichawannok (Old Berwick) became the parish of Unity and was also called Kittery Commons, and Kittery, North Parish. Over time, townspeople ceased using the name Unity and began to refer to this area as "Barwick".
