= Robert Leavitt =

Robert Leavitt may refer to:

- Robert Leavitt (hurdler) (1883-1954), American athlete; winner of 110 m hurdles at the 1906 Summer Olympics
- Robert Greenleaf Leavitt (1865–1942), American botanist
- Robert Keith Leavitt (1895–1967), American Sherlock Holmes scholar; son of Robert Greenleaf Leavitt
