= Robert Keith Leavitt =

American novelist

Robert Keith Leavitt (1895–1967) was a Harvard-educated New York City advertising copywriter who turned to non-fiction writing. He was the author of many books, including a history of Webster's Dictionary and "The Chip on Grandma's Shoulder" (1954.) 'Bob' Leavitt was also the longtime historian of the original The Baker Street Irregulars, devoted to all things Holmesian, about which he wrote in his "The Origins of 221B Worship."

== Background ==
Leavitt was born on August 20, 1895, in Cambridge, Massachusetts, to Dr. Robert Greenleaf Leavitt, a Harvard-trained botanist, researcher, author and later college and high school teacher, and his wife Janet. Dubbed "the fiscal Holmes" by another member of the Baker Street Irregulars, Robert Keith Leavitt showed an early aptitude for ferreting out information. He attended the State Model School in Trenton, New Jersey, where his father was teaching, and graduated from Harvard College in 1917. Shortly afterwards, Leavitt joined the armed forces as 2nd Lieutenant in the 302nd Infantry, where he commanded the Prisoners of War Escort Company 223, with custody of 425 German prisoners.

After the war Leavitt returned home, and found work writing copy for a New York City advertising agency. He spent 13 years in advertising, including a stint as Secretary-Treasurer of the Association of National Advertisers, before turning to a career as a freelance writer. From the beginning Leavitt focused on historical, offbeat subjects. He wrote for a range of publications, including a 1933 article for Business Week – during the height of the Depression – on What we shall sell when the upturn comes – and to whom? Leavitt sold articles to many publications, including Forum and Century, Advertising and Selling, The American Magazine, Forbes and others. In 1946 he wrote a 66-page booklet entitled Your Pay Envelope – and how it gets that way. To make ends meet, Leavitt wrote corporate histories, including that of the Pennsylvania Salt Manufacturing Company, and he wrote for publications of the Great Northern Railway. The former copywriter also continued to dabble in advertising and public relations.

The corporate biographies Leavitt wrote to garner a paycheck included titles like Prologue to Tomorrow: A History of the First Hundred Years in the Life of the Pennsylvania Salt Manufacturing Company (1950); Goods Roads about the General Motors Overseas operations (1949); Foundation for the Future: History of the Stanley Works for Stanley Tools (1951); and 1954's Life at Tung-Sol 1904–1954: An Informal Story of the First Half-century of Tung-Sol Electric Inc. Leavitt also found time to produce books on lighter subjects, notably The Chip on Grandma's Shoulder, a memoir about his Maine grandmother Susan C. (Blazo) Keith, published by J. B. Lippincott in 1954, and Common Sense About Fund Raising (Stratford Press, 1949).

But the book for which Leavitt is remembered is Noah's Ark, New England Yankees, and the Endless Quest: A Short History of the Original Webster Dictionaries, with Particular Reference to Their First Hundred Years as Publications of G. & C. Merriam Company. Although a corporate history—published by G. & C. Merriam Company of Springfield, Massachusetts, in 1947 -- Noah's Ark explores the history of Noah Webster and his competitor Joseph Emerson Worcester. The book's first half examines Webster's life and lexicography; the second half etches the "War of the Dictionaries", the struggle for supremacy between Webster's and his competitor Worcester's dictionaries. Leavitt laid out the history of Webster's publishing house after its eponymous title was sold to the Merriam family (today's Merriam-Webster).

In Noah's Ark Leavitt plumbed the shoals of international lexicography and usage. "In considering the influence of Webster's American Dictionary outside the United States", writes David Micklethwait in Noah Webster and the American Dictionary, "Leavitt says that Webster was 'increasingly the arbiter of definitions in British life', until the appearance of John Ogilvie's Imperial Dictionary in 1850, 'itself largely indebted to the American source.'" Leavitt's work remains the definitive history of Noah Webster and his legacy.

When not writing articles and books, Leavitt indulged his passion for Sherlock Holmes, helping found, with his friend Christopher Morley, The Baker Street Irregulars, an informal group of Arthur Conan Doyle devotees. Records do not reflect when the author's affinity for Sherlock Holmes began, but his works show he was a close reader of Sir Arthur Conan Doyle's oeuvre. It was in Leavitt's writings as historian of the Irregulars that he seemed most at home, his imagination prowling Arthur Conan Doyle's intricate plots, sniffing for clues about the Scottish-born author and his fictional sleuth. In an article entitled Annie Oakley in Baker Street, for instance, Leavitt examined Sherlock Holmes's choice of handgun: Leavitt theorized from Doyle's description that Holmes's sidearm was a Webley Metropolitan Police Model, with 2 1/2-inch barrel – the smallest handgun available, and subject to concealment without a holster.

The voracious Leavitt mined Holmes's adventures for monographs of his own. He authored The Curious Matter of the Anonymous Latin Epitaph, The Cardboard Box and others. In an essay in The Baker Street Journal, the Baker Street Irregulars's periodical, Leavitt thought fit to question the marksmanship of the revered detective. In Annie Oakley in Baker Street, Leavitt claimed that Dr. Watson's revolver shot had toppled the villain Tonga from the deck of the Aurora into the River Thames, and not Holmes's. In another piece Leavitt explored the hazy question of whether Dr. John Watson had remarried. Leavitt was a frequent contributor to The Baker Street Journal, published by Ben Abramson, proprietor of Manhattan's Argus Book Shop and a Holmes aficionado, who published musings of the best-known Sherlockians.

Within the close-knit Irregulars, Leavitt was known for his expertise in ballistics, optics and finances, sometimes combining them to examine the deeds of Conan Doyle's legendary hero.

When not writing about Holmes, Leavitt chose the company of friends like fellow Baker Street Irregulars Christopher Morley and Elmer Davis, as well as other writers, reporters, advertising men and artists of the day.

Leavitt had one brother, Russell Greenleaf Leavitt, who graduated from Harvard College in 1917, and who subsequently received a deferment from the military for poor eyesight. But Russell Leavitt joined the U.S. Navy and eventually wangled an assignment driving an ambulance for the U.S. Army Ambulance Corps during the First World War. Russell Leavitt drove his ambulance on the front lines for 11 months, piloting his vehicle at Verdun and Flanders, and eventually serving in the Chemical Warfare Service Laboratory at Paris.

Bob Leavitt died at Scarsdale, New York, in 1967. He was 72. His botanist father had died in 1942 while walking in Parsonsfield, Maine. His mother, Janet (Shumway) Leavitt, died of pneumonia in 1902 when Leavitt was seven.

== See also ==
- Blazo-Leavitt House
- Robert Greenleaf Leavitt
