= Old Meeting House =

Old Meeting House, Old Meeting-house, or Old Meetinghouse may refer to:

- Old Allenstown Meeting House or Allenstown Meeting House, in Allenstown, New Hampshire
- Old Haverford Friends Meetinghouse, in Havertown, Pennsylvania
- Old Indian Meeting House, in Mashpee, Massachusetts
- Old Jewry Meeting-house, in London, England
- Old Kennett Meetinghouse, in Kennett Township, Chester County, Pennsylvania
- Old Meetinghouse of the Bethany or Old Bethany Church, in Bethany, West Virginia
- Old Mulkey Meetinghouse, in Tompkinsville, Kentucky
- Old North Meeting House or Rockingham Meeting House, in Rockingham, Vermont
- Old Presbyterian Meeting House, in Alexandria, Virginia
- Old Quaker Meeting House (Queens), in Queens, New York
- Old South Meeting House, in Boston, Massachusetts
- Old Town Friends' Meetinghouse, in Baltimore, Maryland
- Old Union Meetinghouse, in Farmington, Maine
- Old Webster Meeting House, in Webster, New Hampshire
- Old White Meeting House Ruins and Cemetery, in Summerville, South Carolina
- Porter Old Meetinghouse, in Porter, Maine
- Sandown Old Meetinghouse, in Sandown, New Hampshire
