= Effingham Academy =

Coordinates: 43.7400°N 71.009°W

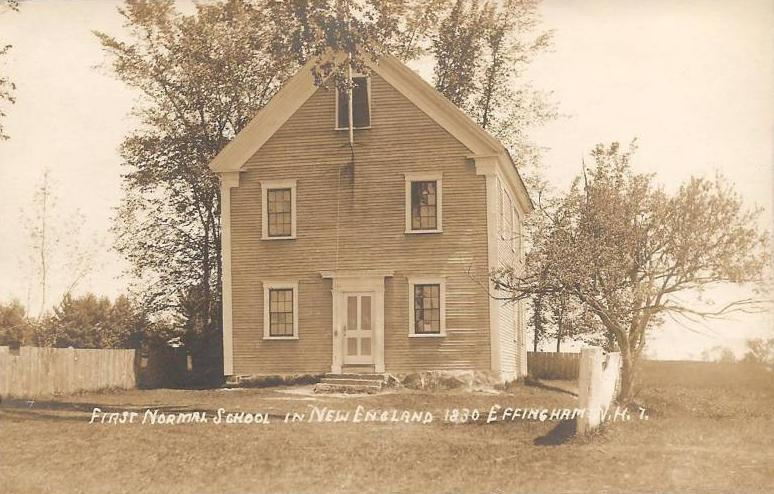
Effingham Union Academy building, now home to the Effingham Historical Society

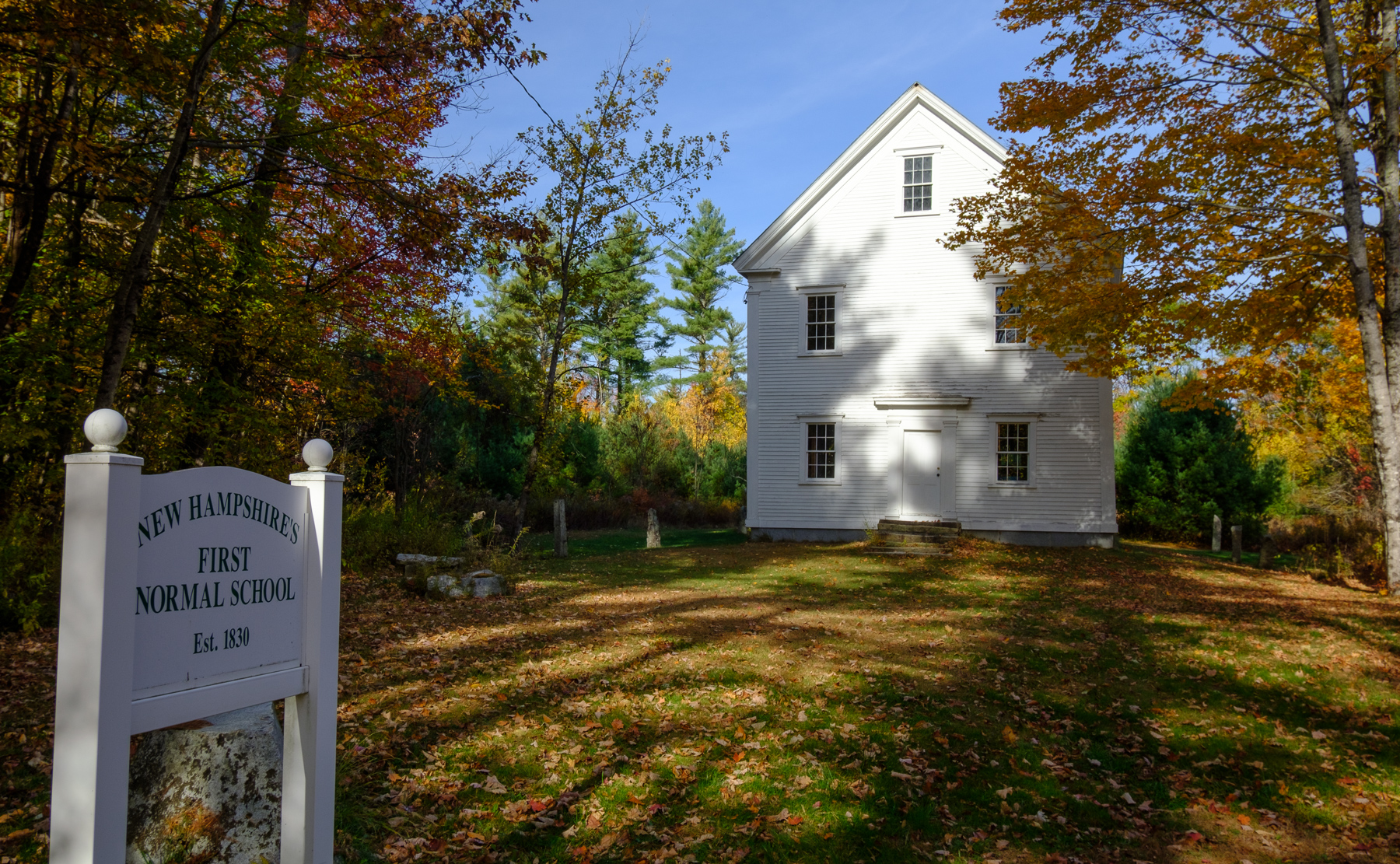
Lord's Hill Historic District, Effingham, New Hampshire

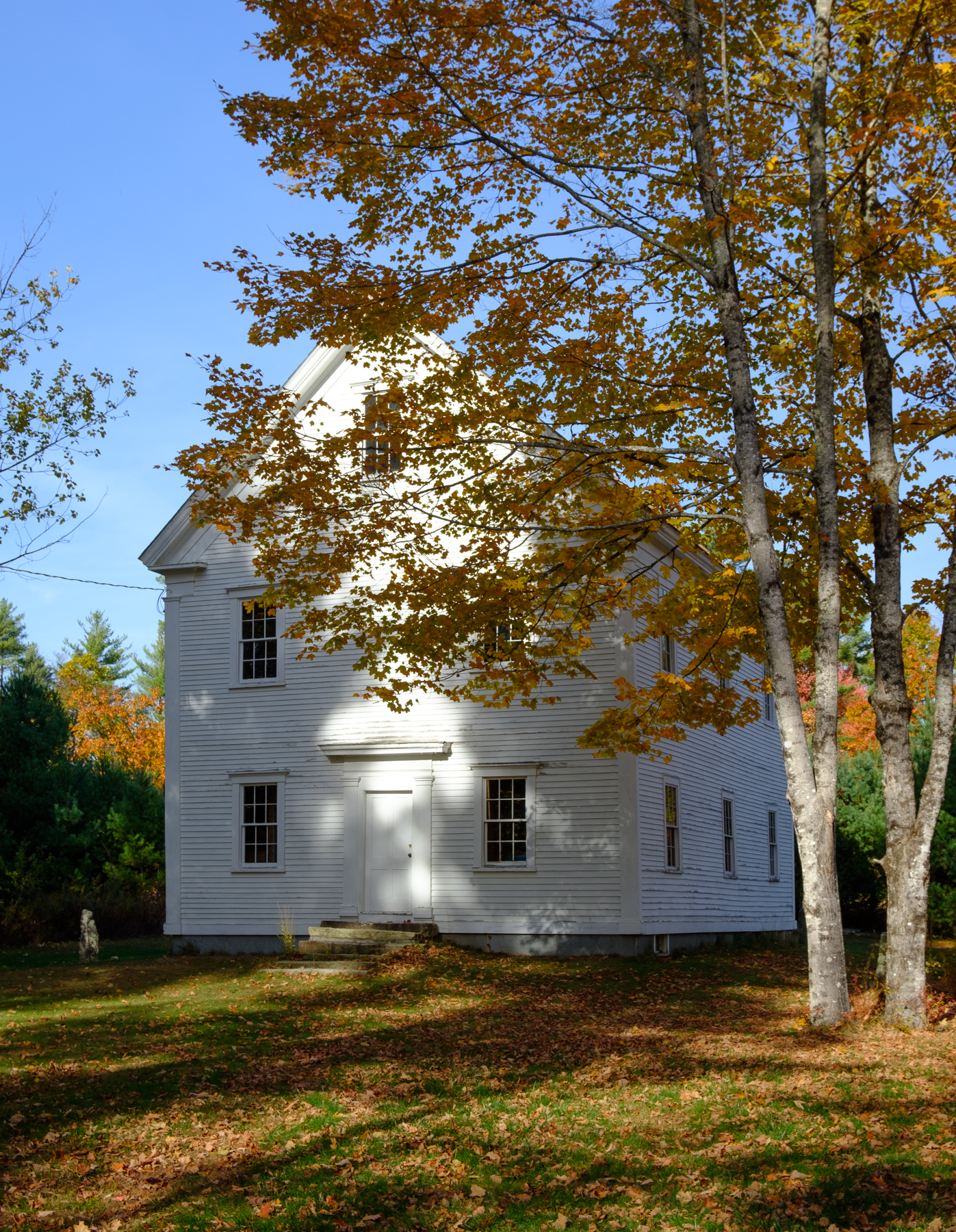
Lord's Hill Historic District, Effingham, New Hampshire

Effingham Academy, also known as Effingham Union Academy, was founded on June 18, 1819 in Effingham, New Hampshire and opened in a new school building in 1820. Rev. Thomas Jameson A.M. was preceptor. A normal school for the training of teachers was established on the school building's second floor in 1830. James W. Bradbury, a Bowdoin graduate, headed it. After 1845 the building became a district schoolhouse. The school was in what is now the Lord's Hill Historic District. Alumni include Amos Tuck. The building is now an Effingham Historical Society property. The Academy is featured on a New Hampshire historical marker, number 83, in Effingham.
