= Capt. James Morison House =

Historic house in Maine, United States

- U.S. National Register of Historic Places
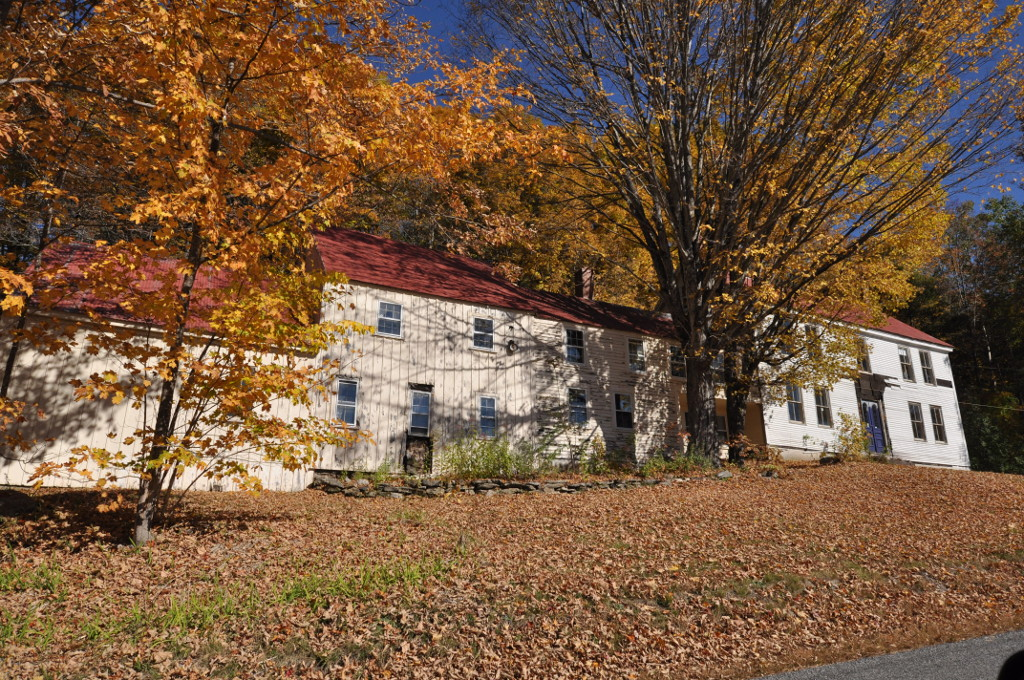

- Location within Maine Location within the United States
- Nearest city: Parsonsfield, Maine
- Coordinates: 43°41′30″N 70°52′49″W
- Area: 1 acre (0.40 ha)
- Built: 1785
- Muralist: Jonathan D. Poor
- NRHP reference No.: 78000335
- Added to NRHP: July 12, 1978

The Capt. James Morison House is a historic house on South Road in Parsonsfield, Maine. Built about 1785 by a veteran of the American Revolutionary War, it is a well-preserved example of early Federal architecture, and is further noted for the murals painted by the itinerant artist Jonathan D. Poor on its walls. It was listed on the National Register of Historic Places in 1978.

== Description and history ==
The Morison House is located in rural southeastern Parsonsfield, on the north side of South Road east of South Parsonsfield. It is traditional New England connected farmstead, with a main house, ell, barn, and shed, which are oriented roughly southeast to northwest. All parts are topped by gable roofs and rest on granite foundations. The main house is a rectangular 2 1/2-story wood-frame structure, with a five-bay main facade facing southwest. It is symmetrically arranged, with a center entrance sheltered by a mid-19th century Italianate bracketed hood. The ell is four bays long and two stories tall, and connects the house to the barn, which is finished in board-and-batten siding. The barn's gable is at right angles to that of the ell and main house, and it is extended to the north by a shed-roof section.

The interior of the main house retains original Federal period woodwork, including a center stairway with delicately carved balusters. The walls of the stairwell and second floor hallway are decorated with murals painted by Jonathan D. Poor. Poor was well known in northern New England for his work, which he learned from his uncle, Rufus Porter. The work in this house is notable for bearing Poor's signature.

James Morison, of Scottish descent, moved to Parsonsfield in 1785, the year it was incorporated. He served in the American Revolutionary War on the staff of General Charles Lee in the New York and New Jersey campaign of 1776, and was wounded in the 1777 Battle of Brandywine. The murals, and other later stylistic elements were probably added to the house by Seth Chellis, who owned one of the area's largest farms in the mid-19th century.

== See also ==
- National Register of Historic Places listings in York County, Maine
