= Province Lake =

Lake in Maine and New Hampshire, United States

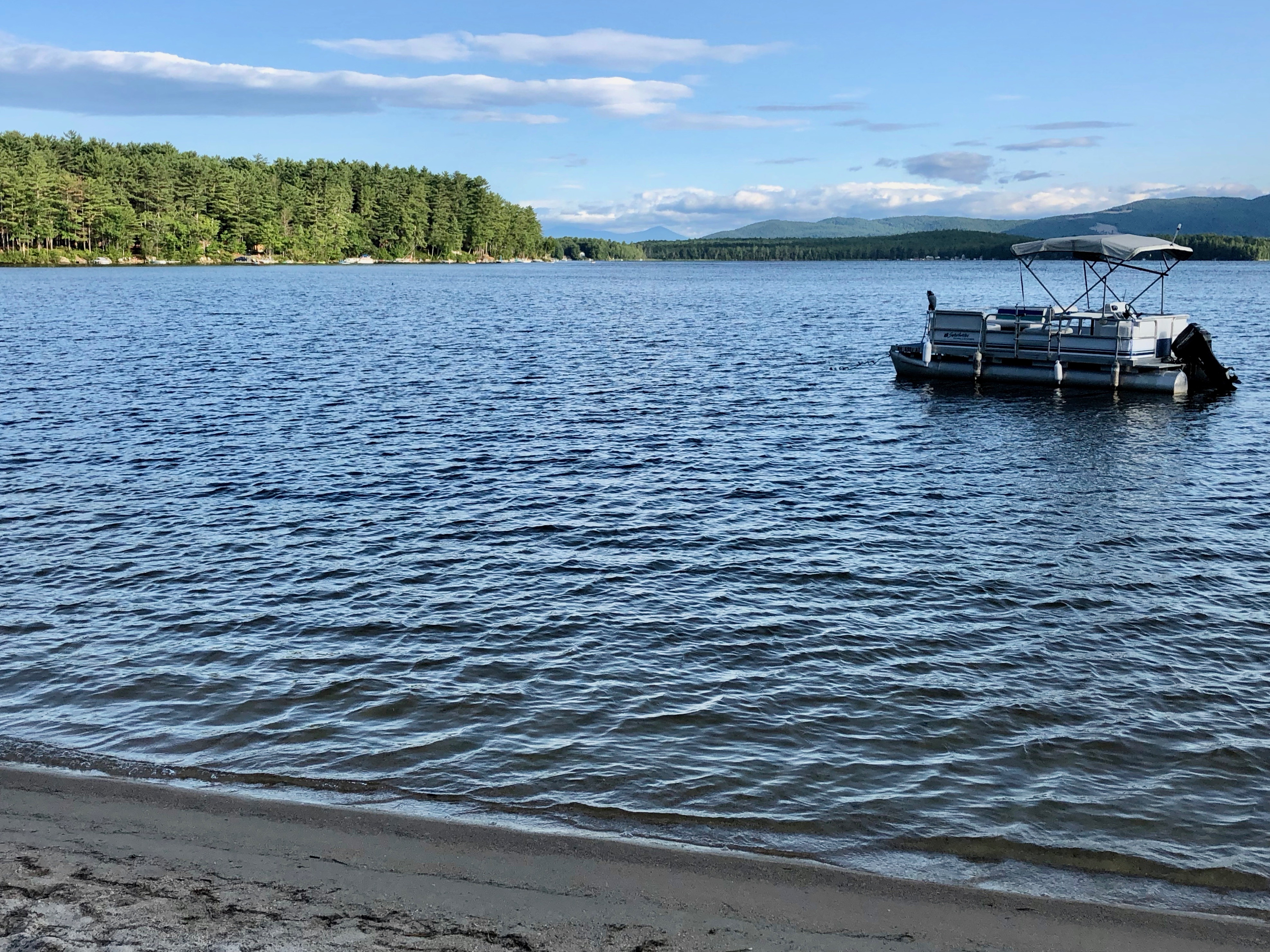
- Province Lake viewed from NH Route 153

- Location within Maine Location within New Hampshire Location within the United States
- Location: Carroll County, New Hampshire; York County, Maine
- Coordinates: 43°41′24″N 70°59′32″W
- Type: eutrophic
- Primary inflows: Hobbs Brook
- Primary outflows: South River
- Catchment area: 7.1 square miles (18 km^{2})
- Basin countries: United States
- Max. length: 1.7 mi (2.7 km)
- Max. width: 1.4 mi (2.3 km)
- Surface area: 968 acres (392 ha)
- Average depth: 9 feet (2.7 m)
- Max. depth: 17 ft (5.2 m)
- Surface elevation: 480 ft (150 m)
- Settlements: South Effingham and Wakefield, New Hampshire; Parsonsfield, Maine

Province Lake is a 968-acre (392 ha) water body located on the border between New Hampshire and Maine in the United States. Approximately 950 acres (380 ha) of the lake lie in the towns of Effingham and Wakefield, New Hampshire, with the remainder in Parsonsfield, Maine. Its outlet is the South River, flowing north to the Ossipee River, a tributary of the Saco River.

Province Lake's maximum depth is between 15 and 17 feet (4.6 and 5.2 m), quite shallow for a New Hampshire lake, so there are no coldwater fish within. It is fed by several wetland areas, one named stream (Hobbs Brook), and by underwater springs. The quality of the water is high. The lake is classified as a warmwater fishery, with observed species including smallmouth and largemouth bass, chain pickerel, and horned pout. Loons, great blue heron, occasional mergansers and bald eagles are seen at the lake.

== See also ==
- List of lakes in Maine
- List of lakes in New Hampshire
