= New England Masonic Charitable Institute =

- U.S. National Register of Historic Places
- NH State Register of Historic Places

- Location within New Hampshire Location within the United States
- Location: 30 Town House Rd., Effingham, New Hampshire
- Coordinates: 43.73956°N 71.01153°W
- Built: 1858
- Architectural style: Italianate
- NRHP reference No.: 100004415

Significant dates
- Added to NRHP: September 19, 2019
- Designated NHSRHP: April 29, 2002

The New England Masonic Charitable Institute is a historic building on Town House Road in Effingham, New Hampshire. It was listed on the National Register of Historic Places in 2019, and the New Hampshire State Register of Historic Places in 2002.

It was founded by the Charter Oak Lodge No. 58 of Free and Accepted Masons. Although some Masonic buildings in other states provided space for schools on their first floors, this is the only school in the United States known to have been run by the Masons.

It is a two-and-a-half story building, built in Italianate style. The Lodge's temple space within the building have trompe-l'œil murals painted by Boston painter Philip A. Butler. The murals depict classic sculptures, architectural details and Masonic symbols, including the All-Seeing Eye. The murals were water-damaged in the late 1980s but have since been restored.

The building now houses the public library for the town of Effingham.

== See also ==
- National Register of Historic Places listings in Carroll County, New Hampshire
