= Thomas Hutson Gregorie =

American physician (1807–1886)

Personal details
- Born: September 27, 1807 Beaufort, South Carolina, U.S.
- Died: January 7, 1886 (aged 78) Grahamville, Beaufort County, South Carolina, U.S.
- Spouse: Martha H. Gillison (m. 1845)
- Children: 11
- Education: Yale College; Medical College in Charleston (MD)
- Occupation: Physician; politician

Thomas Hutson Gregorie (September 27, 1807 – January 7, 1886) was an American medical doctor and politician from South Carolina. He served as a member of the South Carolina State Legislature.

== Early life ==
Thomas Hutson Gregorie was born on September 27, 1807, in Beaufort, South Carolina. He graduated from Yale College in 1828. He received the degree of M.D. from the Medical College in Charleston in 1831.

== Career ==
After graduating, Gregorie practiced medicine in St. Luke's Parish in Beaufort County.

Gregorie served as a member of the South Carolina State Legislature for several years.

== Personal life ==
Gregorie married Martha H. Gillison on July 18, 1845, in Gillisonville. They had 11 children, including six daughters and two sons. His daughter Louisa H. married Henry W. Bradbury, son of James W. Bradbury.

Gregorie died on January 7, 1886, in Grahamville, Beaufort County.
