= Blazo–Leavitt House =

Historic house in Maine, United States

- U.S. National Register of Historic Places
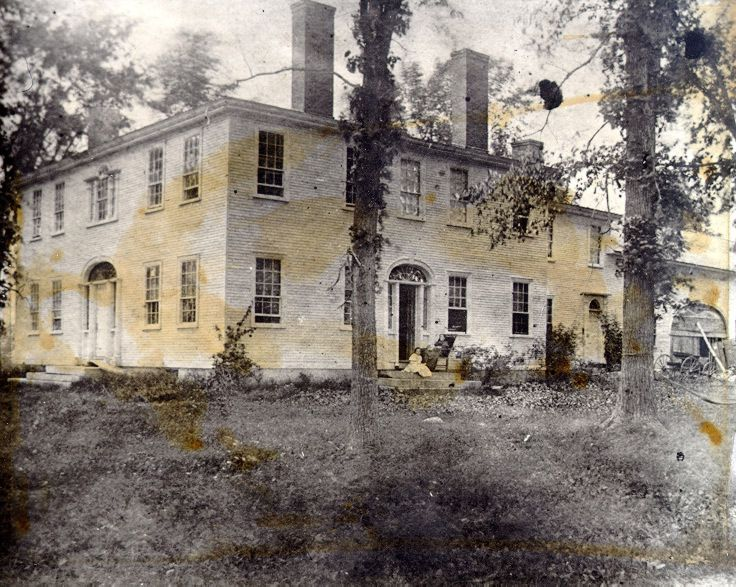
- Photograph ca. 1900

- Location within Maine Location within the United States
- Location: ME 160, Parsonsfield, Maine
- Coordinates: 43°45′43″N 70°56′24″W
- Built: 1812
- Architectural style: Federal
- NRHP reference No.: 82000791
- Added to NRHP: February 19, 1982

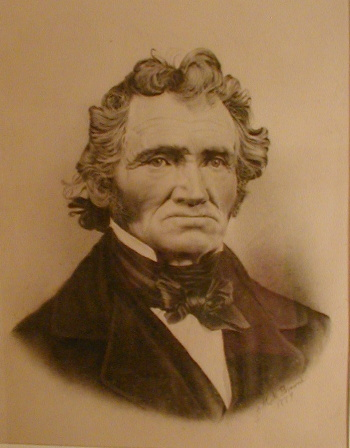
Robert Tibbetts Blazo ca. 1860

The Blazo–Leavitt House is a historic house on Maine State Route 160 in Parsonsfield, Maine, United States. The large two-story house was built in 1812, and is one of the finest Federal period houses in northern York County. The house was listed on the National Register of Historic Places in 1982.

== Description and history ==
The Blazo–Leavitt House is a large two-story mansion built in Parsonsfield, Maine, in 1812 by William Blazo, uncle to prominent Parsonsfield lawyer Robert Tibbetts Blazo. Oral tradition holds that Robert T. Blazo, as a young man of fifteen in 1812, and later aged twenty in 1817, had helped with the construction of his uncle's house. This story seems credible because Robert had been bound out to his uncle William when Robert's father (William's brother) Daniel Blazo fell from a beam at a barn raising in 1802 and broke his neck. Later, ownership of the house passed to the nephew, Robert T. Blazo. The house next was passed on to Robert Blazo's two daughters, Susan Blazo Leavitt and Emily Blazo Browne. Emily's daughter Maude Browne left no descendants, and the house eventually passed into the hands of Susan Blazo Leavitt's son, Robert Greenleaf Leavitt, his wife Ida Ruggli Leavitt, and his three children Russell Greenleaf Leavitt, Robert Keith Leavitt, and Constance Ruggli Leavitt Hanson. Thus it is called the Blazo–Leavitt house. Designed by architect Thomas Eaton, according to both family tradition and affirmed by a Maine preservationist, the home is on the National Register of Historic Places.

The Blazo–Leavitt house has five large brick chimneys and ten fireplaces. The home also boasts elaborately carved and pillared entrances with leaded glass fans and sidelights, panelled doors, and small-paned windows. A complete description of the interior of the house is described in a long narrative poem entitled "Flora Visits Parsonsfield" by Mary Freeman, a resident of the house for thirty years and great, great granddaughter of Robert and Mary Blazo. The main ell of the home was built in 1812, the main part of house being constructed five years later in 1817. William Blazo was son of Amos Blazo, who in turn was son of William Blazo of Bordeaux, France, who emigrated to America sometimes before 1727, settling first in Greenland, New Hampshire, and later in Epsom. Amos Blazo is recorded in the History of Parsonsfield as having been North Parsonsfield's first settler, clearing the fields at "Blazo's Corner" in March 1778. Amos Blazo had five sons, four of whom settled on nearby farms. It was Amos's son William who built the Blazo House, later selling it to his nephew, and Amos's grandson, Robert Tibbetts Blazo.

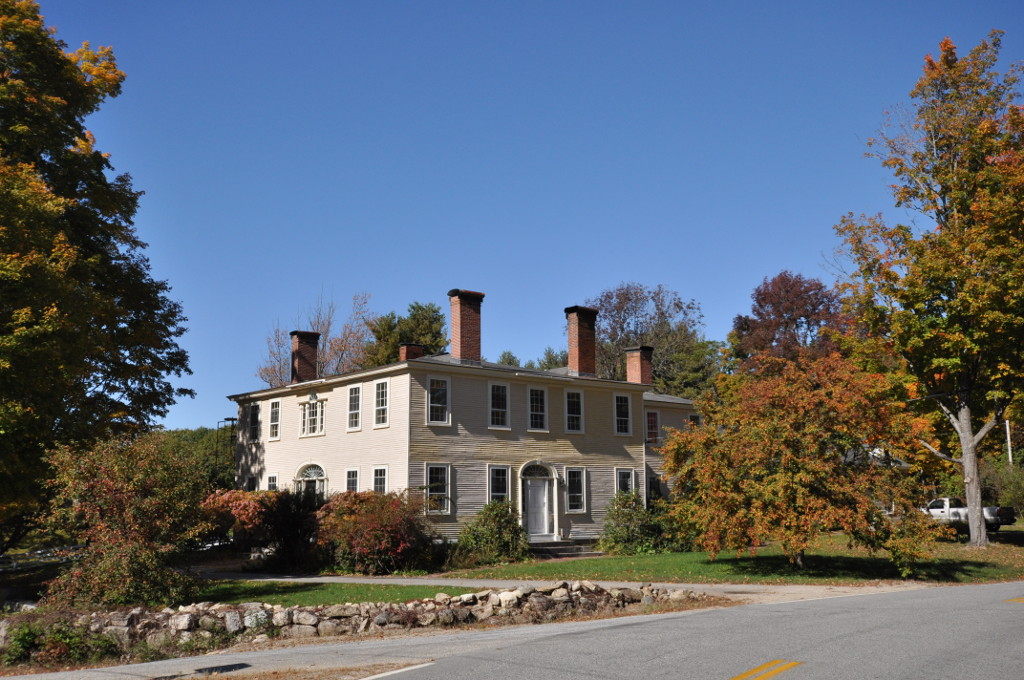
The house in 2015

Robert Tibbetts Blazo had begun his career as a schoolmaster. One of his pupils was fifteen-year-old Mary Freeman of Sandwich, New Hampshire, who would become his bride eight years later. Before the marriage Robert Blazo practiced law for a time in Moultonborough, New Hampshire, but eventually the couple settled in Parsonsfield where Blazo practiced law, and was for many decades Justice of the Peace and Post Master. The couple had four children: Susan, Daniel, Charles and Emily. Descendants of Daniel still reside in the Daniel Blazo house directly across from the Blazo–Leavitt house at Blazo's Corner.

All four Blazo children attended Parsonsfield Seminary, to which their father had conveyed the land and helped establish. Here Susan Blazo met John Greenleaf Leavitt, a fellow student from Buckfield, Maine, who had come to Parsonfield to prepare for Waterville College (today's Colby College). The couple married, and moved into the Blazo house with her parents; they had one child, Robert Greenleaf Leavitt. Emily Blazo married Howard Hiram Browne, and they too took up residence in the house; they had one child, Maude Browne, who later became a portrait artist. Because Maude Browne was unable to have children, eventually ownership of the house came to the Leavitts and to their son Robert Greenleaf Leavitt, a well-known Harvard-educated botanist and educator. After Robert G. Leavitt's death in 1942, Robert's wife Ida and their children, and grandchildren, and great grandchildren, continued living in it every summer. Robert Greenleaf Leavitt's daughter, Constance Leavitt Hanson, with great regret, sold the house in 1973.

The Blazo and Leavitt family have been associated with Parsonsfield Seminary, which is located directly across the road from the house. Robert Tibbetts Blazo, second owner of the Blazo–Leavitt House, conveyed land on which Seminary was built and helped found the Seminary.

The Blazo–Leavitt house faces south, and its western side faces Green Mountain, an isolated mountain in Effingham, New Hampshire and part of the foothills of the White Mountains. Nearby is the Leavitt Plantation Forest (connected with another branch of the Leavitt family), an 8,603-acre (3,482 ha) tract that is the largest contiguous block of forest land south of Sebago Lake. Leavitt Plantation Forest covers 20 percent of Parsonsfield's land. With the support of The Nature Conservancy, the State of Maine has purchased a permanent conservation easement to ensure sustainable forest practices and public pedestrian access for recreation. The easement also prohibits development activity on the property. The land remains as working commercial forest.

== See also ==
- National Register of Historic Places listings in York County, Maine

== See also ==
- Robert Greenleaf Leavitt, Parsonsfield Seminary
