= Kezar Falls, Maine =

Villiage in Maine, United States of America

Coordinates: 43°48′30″N 70°53′20″W

Kezar Falls is an Unincorporated community and Census-designated place (CDP) on the Ossipee River in the towns of Porter and Parsonsfield in Oxford County, Maine, United States. As of the 2020 census, the population of the CDP was 736.

== History ==
An eighteenth-century settler in the area was George Kezar. Kezar's hunting ability became the a subject of local folklore. One tradition says Kezar survived hand-to-hand combat with a bear, another that he sent a pack of wolves "scampering towards Canada" by hanging a bell around the neck of one of them. Although neither George Kezar nor his progeny lived in what became the village of Kezar Falls, he established a rock-to-rock footbridge across the Ossipee River, resulting in the nearby falls being named Kezar Falls, as was the village settlement that grew up around the falls.

Kezar Falls proved a good source of water power, which eventually was harnessed to drive woolen mills, and to generate electricity for the village.

Kezar Falls was incorporated as "Porter Kezar Falls Village Corporation in the Town of Porter" by the Maine State Legislature. A portion of Hiram, Maine also in Oxford County was added to the Porter Kezar Falls Village Corporation in 1913 as an amendment to Chapter 217 to increase the corporate limits of the Porter Kezar Falls Village Corporation.

Historically, there were two Kezar Falls Village Corporations: one at Porter and the other at Parsonsfield in York County, across the Ossipee River. However, the Parsonsfield Kezar Falls Village Corporation was formally repealed by the 107th Legislature of the State of Maine and accepted at Parsonsfield Town Meeting in 1975.

County Population: 211,972

Geographical Features: Ossipee River, 60 lakes, various terrain.
