= Nathaniel Burbank =

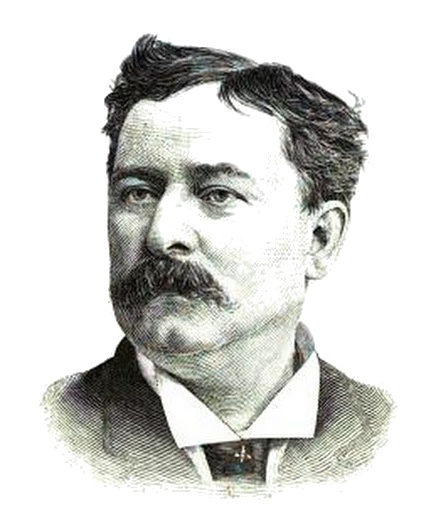

Nathaniel C. Burbank (April 14, 1838 – January 10, 1901) was an American humorist, drama critic, and newspaper editor who for over 20 years was managing editor of the New Orleans Picayune.

Born in Parsonsfield, Maine, at age fourteen he became a printer's apprentice in Dover, New Hampshire. After three years he moved to Boston to continue as a printer.

During the Civil War, he served in Massachusetts and Louisiana, later under General Winfield Scott Hancock, achieving the rank of lieutenant.

Burbank resigned at the end of the war and joined the staff of the New Orleans Republican, where he first became known for humorous writing that was quoted in newspapers throughout the country. In 1878 he joined the editorial staff of the Picayune, and on November 9, 1882, married Ella Burbank, daughter of a wealthy Louisiana planter. He died of acute heart disease in New Orleans in 1901.
