= Freedom, New Hampshire =

- Town
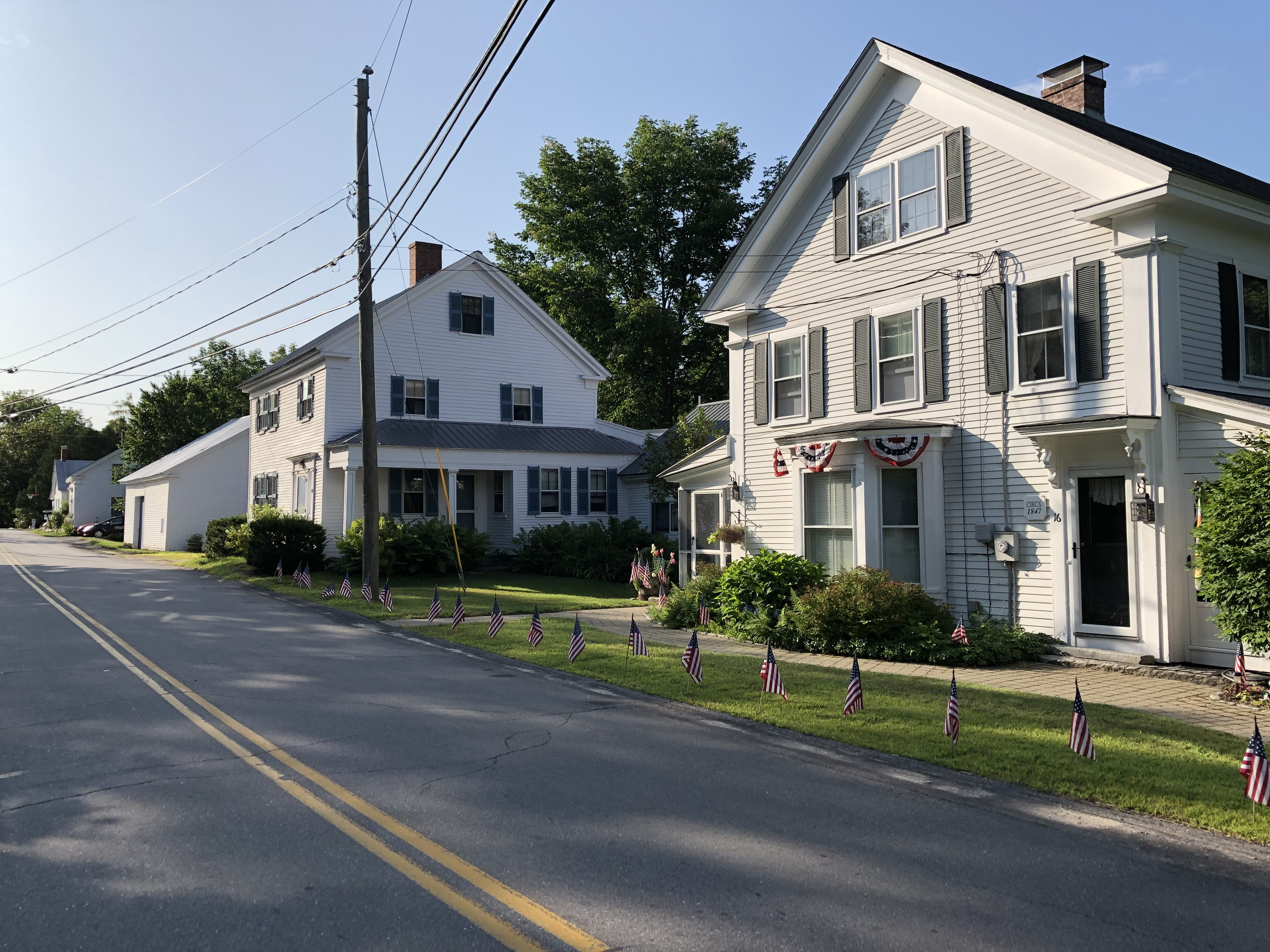
- Houses along Old Portland Road in the town center

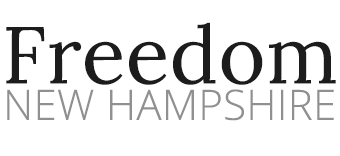
- Seal Logo

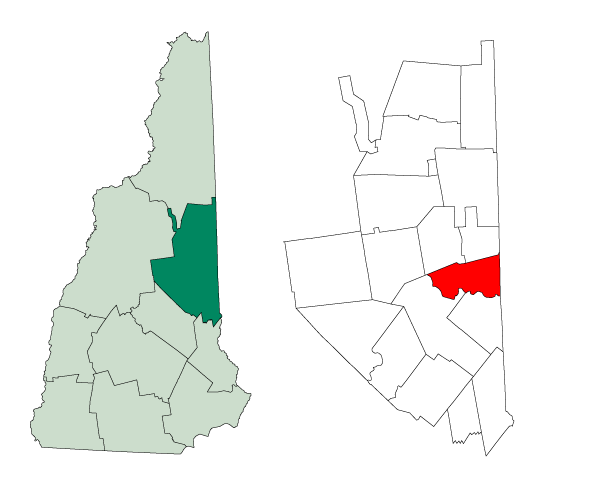
- Location in Carroll County, New Hampshire
- Coordinates: 43°49′34″N 71°04′18″W
- Country: United States
- State: New Hampshire
- County: Carroll
- Incorporated: 1831

Area
  - Total: 37.9 sq mi (98.2 km^{2})
  - Land: 34.7 sq mi (90.0 km^{2})
  - Water: 3.2 sq mi (8.2 km^{2}) 8.37%
- Elevation: 528 ft (161 m)

Population (2020)
  - Total: 1,689
  - Density: 49/sq mi (18.8/km^{2})
- Time zone: UTC-5 (Eastern)
  - Summer (DST): UTC-4 (Eastern)
- ZIP code: 03836
- Area code: 603
- FIPS code: 33-27700
- GNIS feature ID: 873601
- Website: townoffreedomnh.gov

Freedom is a town located in Carroll County, New Hampshire, United States. The population was 1,689 at the 2020 census, and an estimated 1,707 in 2025, up from 1,489 at the 2010 census. The town's eastern boundary runs along the Maine state border. Ossipee Lake, with a resort and camps, is in the southwest of the town.

== History ==
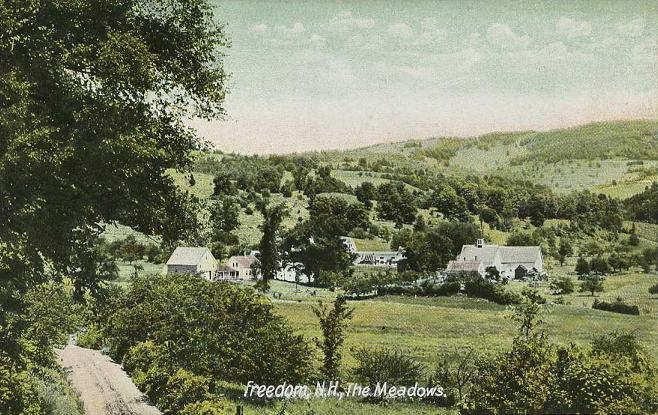
The Meadows c. 1910

The town was once a part of Effingham called "North Effingham". Following an influx of new settlers from Maine, there was a conflict of culture and religion between them and people from the New Hampshire seacoast area who already populated Effingham. As a result, North Effingham separated into a town of its own. The community, incorporated in 1831, was named "Freedom" to commemorate its separation from Effingham.

== Geography ==
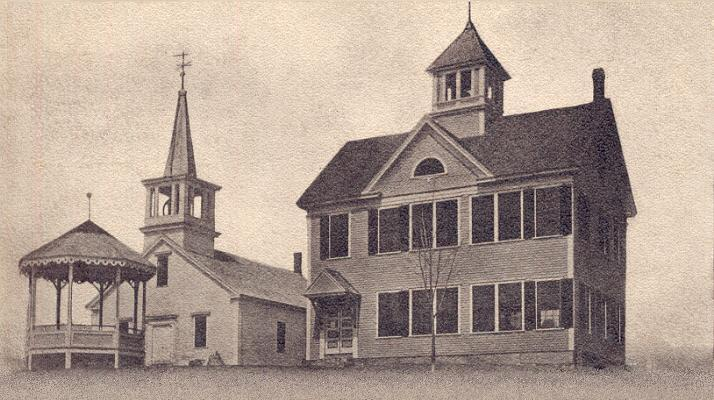
Freedom Village Grammar School in 1911

Freedom is situated between the Lakes Region and the White Mountains. According to the United States Census Bureau, the town has a total area of 37.9 square miles (98.2 km^{2}), of which 34.7 square miles (90.0 km^{2}) are land and 3.2 square miles (8.2 km^{2}) are water, comprising 8.37% of the town. The highest point in Freedom is the summit of Cragged Mountain in the northeastern corner of the town, at 1,806 feet (550 m) above sea level. Freedom is drained by the Ossipee River and lies fully within the Saco River watershed.

Freedom is one of several sites for Nature's Classroom. It is also home to one of the permanent campsites of the Luethi-Peterson Camps and to Cragged Mountain Farm, a co-ed summer camp on Cragged Mountain started by Dr. Henry Utter in 1927, and still owned by the Utter family.

=== Adjacent municipalities ===
- Eaton (northeast)
- Porter, Maine (east)
- Effingham (south)
- Ossipee (southwest)
- Madison (northwest)

== Demographics ==
Historical population
Census	Pop.	Note	%±
1840	926		—
1850	910		−1.7%
1860	917		0.8%
1870	737		−19.6%
1880	714		−3.1%
1890	630		−11.8%
1900	594		−5.7%
1910	542		−8.8%
1920	467		−13.8%
1930	390		−16.5%
1940	352		−9.7%
1950	315		−10.5%
1960	363		15.2%
1970	387		6.6%
1980	720		86.0%
1990	935		29.9%
2000	1,303		39.4%
2010	1,489		14.3%
2020	1,689		13.4%
2024 (est.)	1,716		1.6%
U.S. Decennial Census

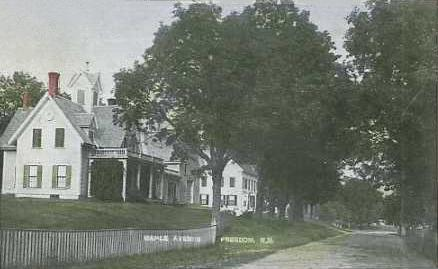
Street scene c. 1910

As of the census of 2010, there were 1,489 people, 699 households, and 457 families residing in the town. The population density was 42.5 inhabitants per square mile (16.4/km^{2}). There were 1,580 housing units at an average density of 45.1 per square mile (17.4/km^{2}). The racial makeup of the town was 98.8% White, 0.1% African American, 0.3% Asian, 0.1% some other race, and 0.7% from two or more races.

There were 699 households, out of which 19.0% had children under the age of 18 living with them, 56.9% were headed by married couples living together, 5.7% had a female householder with no husband present, and 34.6% were non-families. 28.9% of all households were made up of individuals, and 14.5% were someone living alone who was 65 years of age or older. The average household size was 2.12, and the average family size was 2.57.

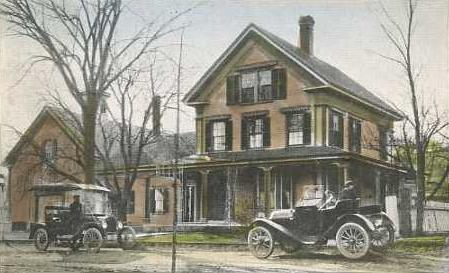
Philbrick House in 1916

In the town, the population was spread out, with 15.6% under the age of 18, 4.9% from 18 to 24, 16.8% from 25 to 44, 35.9% from 45 to 64, and 26.9% who were 65 years of age or older. The median age was 53.1 years. For every 100 females, there were 101.5 males. For every 100 females age 18 and over, there were 97.8 males.

For the period 2007–2011, the estimated median annual income for a household in the town was $47,375, and the median income for a family was $50,769. Male full-time workers had a median income of $40,536 versus $33,958 for females. The per capita income for the town was $32,537. About 6.0% of families and 7.2% of the population were below the poverty line, including 13.4% of those under the age of 18 and 3.6% of those 65 and older.

The largest ancestry groups in Freedom as of 2007–2011 were:

- 29.8% English
- 27.2% Irish
- 22.0% French and French Canadian
- 9.6% Scottish
- 7.7% Swedish
- 7.5% German
- 5.7% Scotch-Irish
- 5.2% Italian

== Sites of interest ==
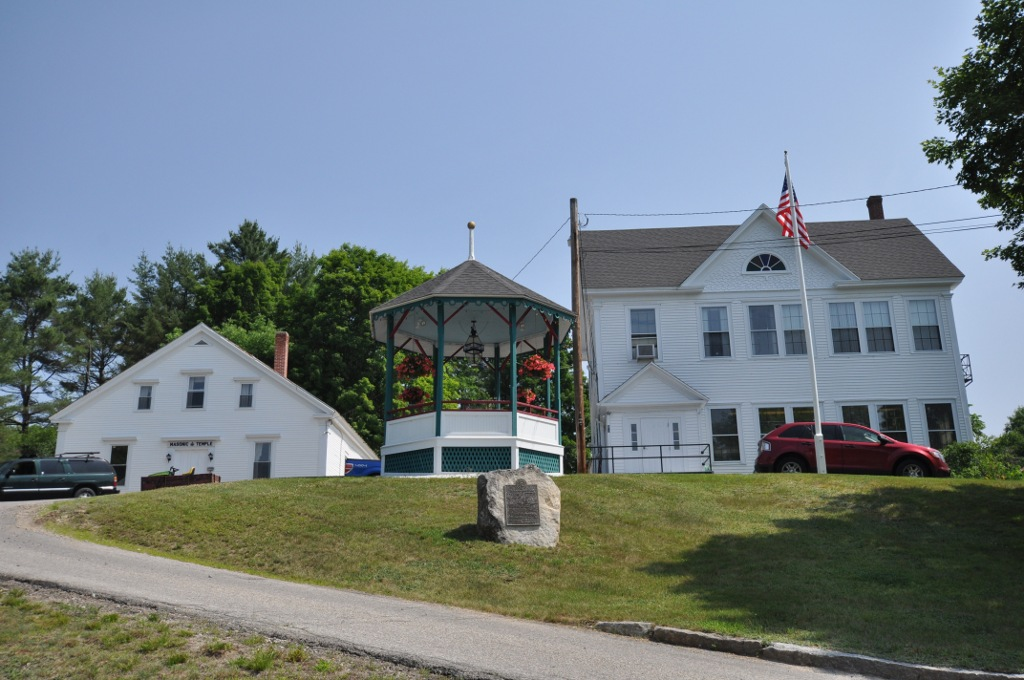
Town hall

- Allard House & Works Museum, Freedom Historical Society

== Cultural references ==
- The town was the setting for the children's fantasy book The Enormous Egg by Oliver Butterworth, first published in 1956 but reissued years later.
- "House on Loon Lake", a 2001 episode of This American Life, depicted an abandoned house explored by young boys in town for summer camp at Loon Lake.

== Notable person ==
- Frank S. Black (1853–1913), 32nd governor of New York
