= Charles Augustus Hilton =

Union Army soldier

- Born: July 22, 1845; Parsonsfield, Maine
- Died: October 24, 1912 (aged 67); Minneapolis, Minnesota
- Military career
- Allegiance: United States of America; Union
- Branch: Union Army
- Service years: 1862-63; 1864-65
- Rank: private, corporal
- Units: 27th Maine Infantry, 6th MA Infantry, 12th MA Light Artillery Ind Batt

Charles Augustus Hilton (July 22, 1845 – October 24, 1912) was a Union soldier in the American Civil War and later became a Free Will Baptist preacher. Hilton, New York, a village in the town of Parma, was named after him in 1896. He was born on July 22, 1845, in Parsonsfield, Maine, the son of George and Abigail F (Ricker) Hilton, and died in Minneapolis, MN on October 24, 1912. He was married on April 21, 1872, in Frankfort, Illinois, to Sarah Adelaide Carpenter, the daughter of Josiah and Frances (Haradon) Carpenter. She was born on January 21, 1853, in Frankfort, Illinois, and died in Minneapolis, Minnesota, on October 8, 1944.

He first enlisted in the 27th Maine Infantry on September 30, 1862, having just turned 17 that summer (papers say age 18). Following his mustering out in July 1863, he moved to Lowell, Massachusetts, and was working as a clerk there when he re-enlisted twice. He served as a private first class in the 6th Massachusetts Infantry for a 100-day service call (7 July 1864 to 27 Oct, 1864), followed by his service with the 12th Independent Battery of Massachusetts Light Artillery (14 Nov, 1864 - 25 July 1865). During one of these military stints, he became sick with disease, as noted in his biography in the History of Parsonsfield. He filed for a pension immediately after the War, on 20 Oct, 1866.

Beginning in 1868, Charles entered the ministry as a Free Will Baptist preacher, though having no theological training except for his own self-teaching. In his first year, he was a pastor in nearby Ross Corner (Shapleigh), Maine, but then removed to Frankfort, Illinois. It was during his five years here as a school teacher and minister that he met his wife Sarah and had two of their three children. In 1874, he accepted a position at the Free Baptist Church in Parma, New York. His service to the village was deemed so memorable in the 7 and a half years he was there, that they renamed their village after him in 1896.

His biography again mentions his poor health, forcing him to "accept a field where the demands upon him would not be so exacting" (a smaller church membership perhaps?), and settled at East Kendall, New York, in 1882. Only remaining here a year, he then returned to New England and to a church in Haverhill, Massachusetts. The two-page biography of him in the Parsonsfield history ends in 1887, with him still in Haverhill. From here, likely in 1888, he went to Chelsea, Massachusetts, and was there during the time of the 1890 census (and Veteran Schedule). Street directories show his residence there through 1893, but he removed to Randolph, Massachusetts, by 1900.

His final pastorate began around 1904, when he was certified on 10 February as a Congregational minister and began work at the church on Fremont Ave in Minneapolis, MN. Charles had moved to the city c. Sept, 1903. It was in this city where Charles and his wife died, presumably buried here.

Charles and Sarah had three children: Edna, George Fay, and Ruth
