= South River (Ossipee River tributary) =

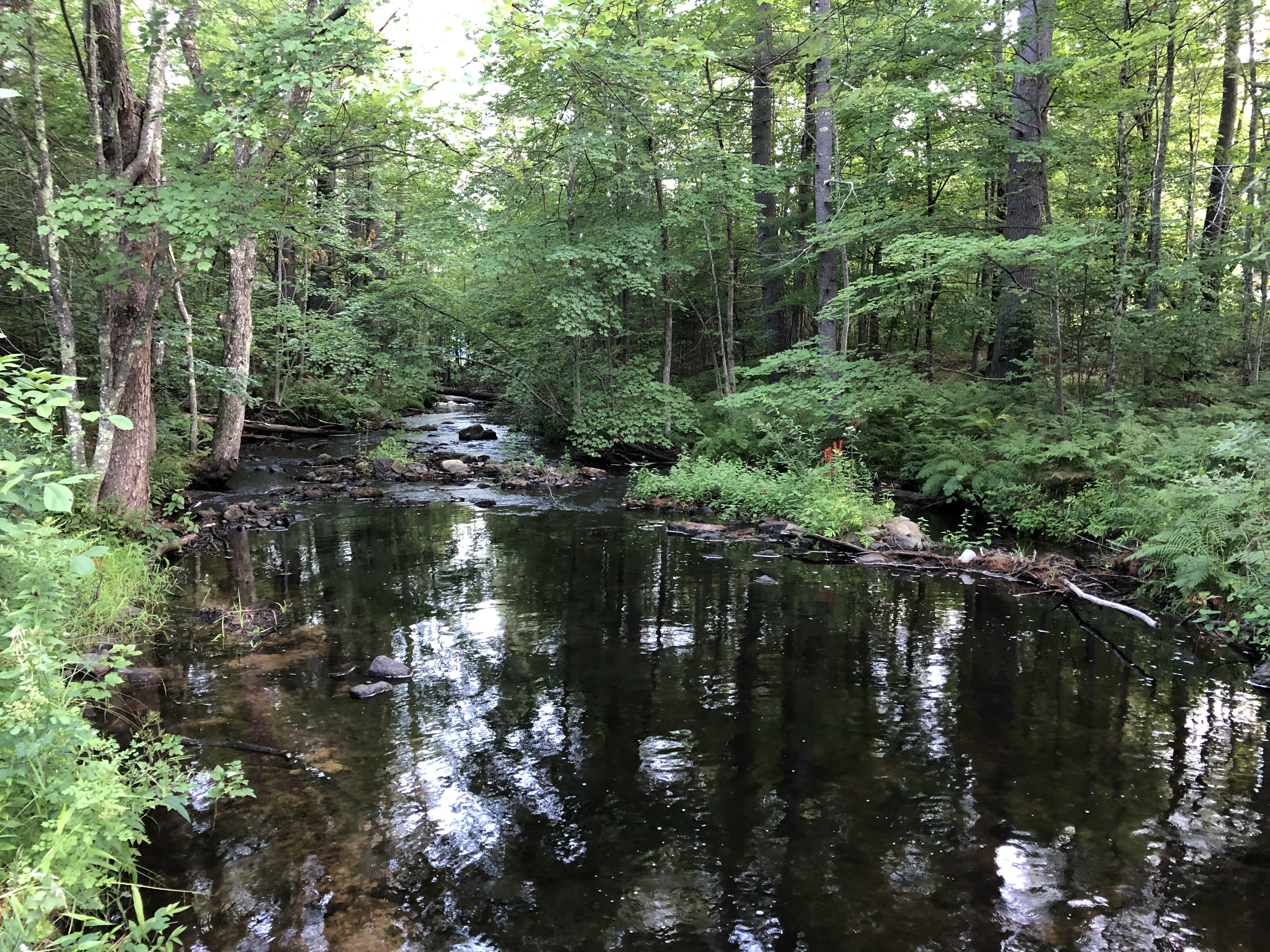
- The South River south of Center Effingham, NH

- Location within Maine Location within New Hampshire Location within the United States

Location
- Country: United States
- States: New Hampshire, Maine
- Counties: Carroll, NH, York, ME
- Towns: Effingham, NH, Parsonsfield, ME

Physical characteristics
- Source: Province Lake
  - location: Effingham, NH
  - coordinates: 43°42′0″N 70°59′50″W
  - elevation: 480 ft (150 m)
- Mouth: Ossipee River
  - location: Parsonsfield, ME
  - coordinates: 43°47′5″N 70°57′24″W
  - elevation: 375 ft (114 m)
- Length: 10.6 mi (17.1 km)

Basin features
- Tributaries
  - left: Salmon Brook, Hobbs Brook
  - right: Emerson Brook

The South River is a 10.6-mile-long (17.1 km) river in eastern New Hampshire and western Maine in the United States. It is a tributary of the Ossipee River, which flows east to the Saco River and ultimately the Atlantic Ocean.

The South River begins at the outlet of Province Lake in the town of Effingham, New Hampshire, and proceeds north past the village of Center Effingham. Jogging east, the river enters Parsonsfield, Maine, then turns north again to reach the Ossipee River.

== See also ==
- List of rivers of New Hampshire
