= James W. Bradbury =

American politician (1802–1901)

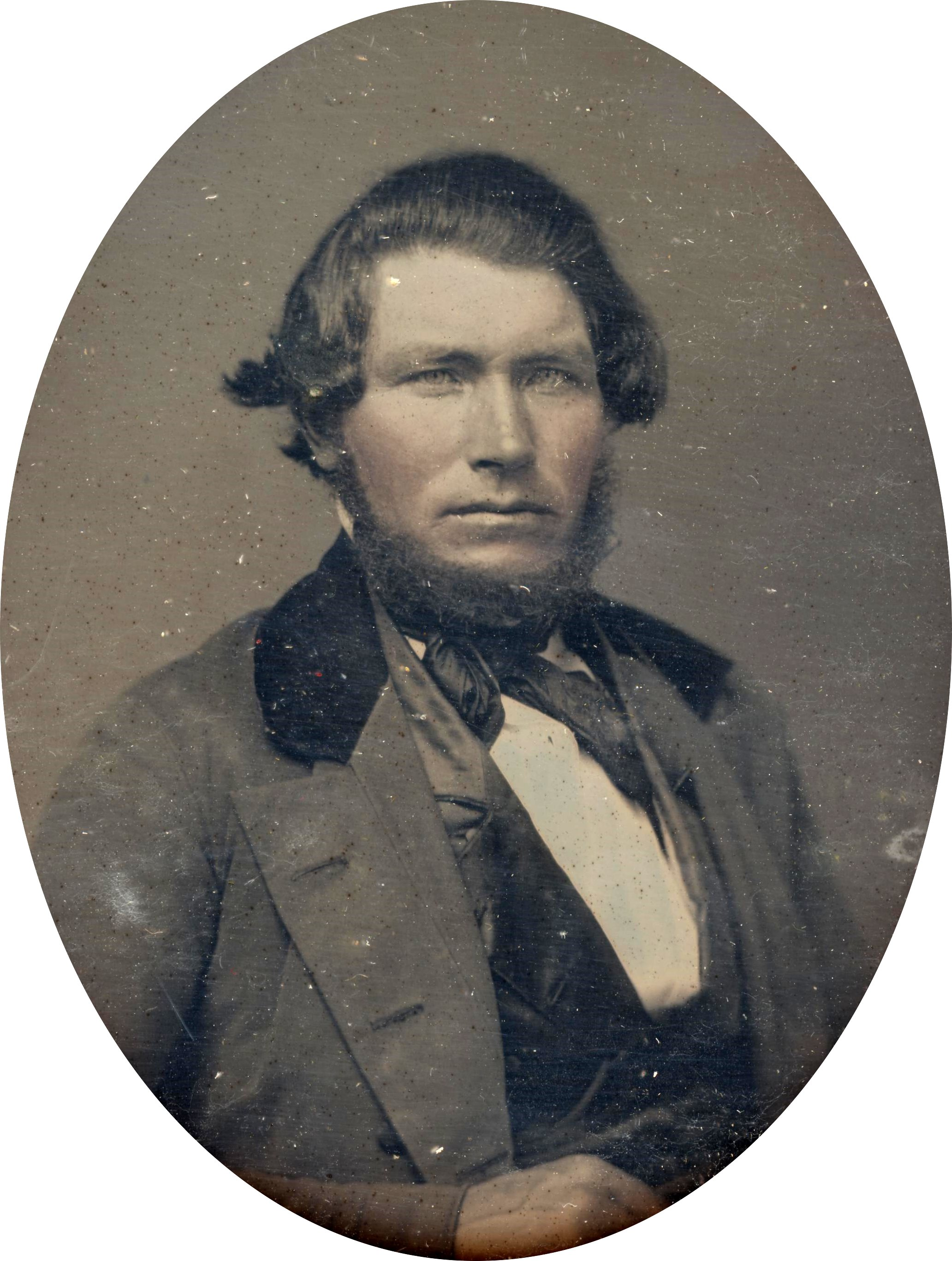

United States Senator from Maine
- In office March 4, 1847 – March 3, 1853
- Preceded by: George Evans
- Succeeded by: William P. Fessenden

County Attorney of Kennebec County, Maine
- In office January 17, 1834 – March 27, 1838
- Preceded by: Robert Goodenow
- Succeeded by: Henry W. Paine

Personal details
- Born: June 10, 1802 Parsonsfield, Maine, U.S.
- Died: January 6, 1901 (aged 98) Augusta, Maine, U.S.
- Resting place: Forest Grove Cemetery, Augusta, Maine, U.S.
- Party: Democratic
- Spouse: Eliza Ann Westbrook (m. 1834)
- Children: 4
- Education: Bowdoin College
- Profession: Attorney

James Ware Bradbury (June 10, 1802 – January 6, 1901) was an American attorney and politician from Maine. A Democrat, he served as a United States Senator from 1847 to 1853.

== Early life ==
James W. Bradbury was born in Parsonsfield, Maine on June 10, 1802, the eldest son of Dr. James Bradley and Ann (Moulton) Bradbury. He attended the local schools of Parsonfield, academies in Saco, Maine and Limerick, Maine, Gorham Academy in Gorham, Maine, and Effingham Academy in Effingham, New Hampshire. He then attended Bowdoin College, from which he received a Bachelor of Arts degree in 1825. Bradbury graduated third in his class, was selected for Phi Beta Kappa, and was chosen to deliver a graduation ceremony oration. Among his classmates were Henry Wadsworth Longfellow, Josiah S. Little, Jonathan Cilley, Nathaniel Hawthorne, John Stevens Cabot Abbott, and George B. Cheever. During his college years, Bradbury also developed a friendship with Franklin Pierce, a member of Bowdoin's Class of 1824.

== Start of career ==
Bradbury taught school after graduating from Bowdoin and became principal of the academy in Hallowell, Maine. In 1828, he received a Master of Arts from Bowdoin. In 1829, he founded New Hampshire's first normal school on the second floor of Effingham Academy in Effingham. While teaching school, he began to study law with attorneys Rufus McIntire of Parsonfield and Ether Shepley of Portland. He was admitted to the bar in 1830 and began to practice in Augusta, Maine. During his career as an attorney, Bradbury practiced at different times in partnership with Horatio D. Bridge, Richard D. Rice, Lot M. Morrill, Joseph H. Meserve, and his son, James W. Bradbury Jr. In the late 1830s, he lobbied the Maine Legislature for passage of the charter for the Portland, Saco and Portsmouth Railroad. In the 1840s, he shepherded passage of a charter for the Atlantic and St. Lawrence Railroad.

A Democrat in politics, in addition to practicing law he was for a year the editor of the Maine Patriot, a Democratic newspaper. He was prosecuting attorney for Kennebec County from 1834 until 1838. He was a delegate to the 1844 Democratic National Convention, which nominated James K. Polk for the presidency.

== U.S. Senator ==
Bradbury was elected to the United States Senate in 1846 and served one term, March 4, 1847, until March 3, 1853. During his senate career, he served as chairman of the Committee On Printing and was a member of the Judiciary Committee and the Committee on Claims. In addition, he served on a special committee that worked to resolve the French Spoliation cases, claims against France for losses incurred during the Quasi-War between the U.S. and France in the late 1700s.

In the senate, Bradbury also oversaw passage of the first bill appropriating funds for improving the Kennebec River. Like most other Democrats, he was a supporter of U.S. participation in the Mexican–American War and opposed efforts to end or limit the spread of slavery on the grounds that slavery was constitutional. Bradbury declined to be a candidate for reelection in 1852, and resumed the practice of law in Augusta.

== Later life ==
Bradbury continued practicing law until well into his nineties, earning a reputation for attention to detail and effective courtroom advocacy. According to biographer and historian Edward Stanwood, Franklin Pierce's selection as the Democratic nominee for president in 1852 was the result of a plan originated by Bradbury. In 1846, he was elected to the Bowdoin College board of overseers. In 1861 he was elected to Bowdoin's board of trustees, and he served as chairman of the board's finance committee for more than 20 years. He was a member of the Maine Historical Society beginning in the 1840s, and was the organization's president from 1867 to 1887. In 1872, Bradbury received the honorary degree of LL.D. from Bowdoin College.

Upon the death of former Iowa senator George Wallace Jones in 1896, Bradbury became the last living person who served in the Senate during the 32nd Congress. Bradbury died in Augusta on January 6, 1901. He was buried at Forest Grove Cemetery in Augusta.

== Family ==
On November 25, 1834, Bradbury married Eliza Ann Westbrook of Augusta. They were the parents of four sons, and she died in 1879. His son Henry W. married Louisa H. Gregorie, daughter of Thomas Hutson Gregorie.

== See also ==
- New Hampshire Historical Marker No. 83: First Normal School in New Hampshire

== Sources ==
- United States Congress. "James W. Bradbury (id: B000734)". Biographical Directory of the United States Congress.

U.S. Senate
Preceded by George Evans	U.S. senator (Class 2) from Maine; March 4, 1847 – March 3, 1853; Served alongside: John Fairfield, Wyman B. S. Moor, Hannibal Hamlin	Succeeded by William P. Fessenden
Honorary titles
Preceded by David Meriwether	Oldest living U.S. senator April 4, 1893 – January 6, 1901	Succeeded by Daniel T. Jewett
Preceded by Simon Cameron	Most senior living U.S. senator (Sitting or former) with Alpheus Felch until 1896; June 26, 1889 – January 6, 1901	Succeeded by John Henderson
