= Porter, Maine =

Town in Maine, United States

- Town
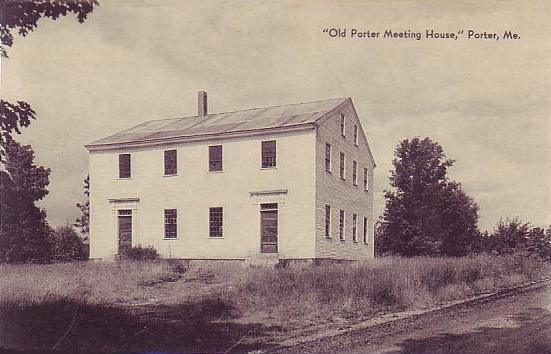
- Old Porter Meeting House (built 1828), c. 1922

- Seal

- Location within Maine Location within the United States
- Coordinates: 43°51′42″N 70°56′23″W
- Country: United States
- State: Maine
- County: Oxford
- Incorporated: 1807

Area
  - Total: 32.87 sq mi (85.13 km^{2})
  - Land: 31.50 sq mi (81.58 km^{2})
  - Water: 1.37 sq mi (3.55 km^{2})
- Elevation: 725 ft (221 m)

Population (2020)
  - Total: 1,600
  - Density: 51/sq mi (19.6/km^{2})
- Time zone: UTC-5 (Eastern (EST))
  - Summer (DST): UTC-4 (EDT)
- ZIP code: 04068
- Area code: 207
- FIPS code: 23-60405
- GNIS feature ID: 582682
- Website: portermaine.org

Porter is a town in Oxford County, Maine, United States. It is included in the Portland-South Portland-Biddeford, Maine metropolitan New England City and Town Area. Porter includes Porter village and part of Kezar Falls. The population was 1,600 at the 2020 census.

== History ==
The land was once territory of Pequawket, the Abenaki village at what is now Fryeburg. It was purchased from the Massachusetts General Court in September 1795 by Dr. Aaron Porter of Biddeford and others. Terms of the grant offered 100 acres (40 ha) to each man who settled before January 1, 1784. First called Portersfield Plantation, it was incorporated as a town on February 20, 1807, named for its principal proprietor. Land was set off to Brownfield in 1831, 1832 and 1855.

Although farmers found the town's surface uneven, the hillsides offered excellent pasturage for cattle. Porter became noted for its orchards. Outlets of ponds provided sites for mills, with the best water power on the Ossipee River at Kezar Falls, where part of the village lies in Parsonsfield. The town had numerous sawmills, a gristmill, furniture factory, bobbin factory and a boot and shoe factory. In 1870, the population was 1,104.

== Geography ==
According to the United States Census Bureau, the town has a total area of 32.87 square miles (85.13 km^{2}), of which 31.50 square miles (81.58 km^{2}) is land and 1.37 square miles (3.55 km^{2}) is water. Porter is drained by the Ossipee River.

The town is crossed by state routes 25 and 160. Porter borders the towns of Eaton and Freedom, New Hampshire to the west, Brownfield to the north, Hiram to the east, and Parsonsfield to the south.

== Demographics ==
Historical population
Census	Pop.	Note	%±
1810	292		—
1820	487		66.8%
1830	841		72.7%
1840	1,133		34.7%
1850	1,208		6.6%
1860	1,240		2.6%
1870	1,104		−11.0%
1880	1,095		−0.8%
1890	1,015		−7.3%
1900	886		−12.7%
1910	864		−2.5%
1920	820		−5.1%
1930	883		7.7%
1940	892		1.0%
1950	1,052		17.9%
1960	975		−7.3%
1970	1,115		14.4%
1980	1,222		9.6%
1990	1,301		6.5%
2000	1,438		10.5%
2010	1,498		4.2%
2020	1,600		6.8%
U.S. Decennial Census

=== 2010 census ===
As of the census of 2010, there were 1,498 people, 621 households, and 416 families living in the town. The population density was 47.6 inhabitants per square mile (18.4/km^{2}). There were 816 housing units at an average density of 25.9 per square mile (10.0/km^{2}). The racial makeup of the town was 97.2% White, 0.8% African American, 0.2% Native American, 0.5% Asian, 0.2% Pacific Islander, 0.1% from other races, and 1.0% from two or more races. Hispanic or Latino of any race were 0.6% of the population.

There were 621 households, of which 28.0% had children under the age of 18 living with them, 49.3% were married couples living together, 11.3% had a female householder with no husband present, 6.4% had a male householder with no wife present, and 33.0% were non-families. 25.8% of all households were made up of individuals, and 9.7% had someone living alone who was 65 years of age or older. The average household size was 2.41 and the average family size was 2.83.

The median age in the town was 44.4 years. 20.2% of residents were under the age of 18; 8.1% were between the ages of 18 and 24; 22.6% were from 25 to 44; 33.6% were from 45 to 64; and 15.5% were 65 years of age or older. The gender makeup of the town was 50.5% male and 49.5% female.

=== 2000 census ===
As of the census of 2000, there were 1,438 people, 562 households, and 1,410 families living in the town. The population density was 45.7 inhabitants per square mile (17.6/km^{2}). There were 742 housing units at an average density of 23.6 per square mile (9.1/km^{2}). The racial makeup of the town was 97.01% White, 0.35% African American, 0.49% Native American, 0.35% Asian, 0.21% from other races, and 1.60% from two or more races. Hispanic or Latino of any race were 0.70% of the population.

There were 562 households, out of which 31.9% had children under the age of 18 living with them, 54.6% were married couples living together, 12.6% had a female householder with no husband present, and 27.0% were non-families. 21.5% of all households were made up of individuals, and 8.0% had someone living alone who was 65 years of age or older. The average household size was 2.56 and the average family size was 2.92.

In the town, the population was spread out, with 25.9% under the age of 18, 8.6% from 18 to 24, 28.2% from 25 to 44, 24.0% from 45 to 64, and 13.4% who were 65 years of age or older. The median age was 38 years. For every 100 females, there were 96.2 males. For every 100 females age 18 and over, there were 93.8 males.

The median income for a household in the town was $33,802, and the median income for a family was $37,552. Males had a median income of $25,739 versus $23,000 for females. The per capita income for the town was $15,271. About 12.9% of families and 14.8% of the population were below the poverty line, including 20.3% of those under age 18 and 11.0% of those age 65 or over.

== Local schools ==
- Sacopee Valley Middle School
- Sacopee Valley High School

== Notable people ==
- Samuel W. Gould, US congressman
- Harry Lord (1882–1948), baseball player for the Boston Red Sox

== Sites of interest ==
- Parsonsfield-Porter Bridge, a two-span covered bridge built in 1876
- Parsonsfield-Porter Historical Society & Museum
- Maine Teen Camp
- Old Porter Meeting House
