= East Parsonsfield, Maine =

- Village
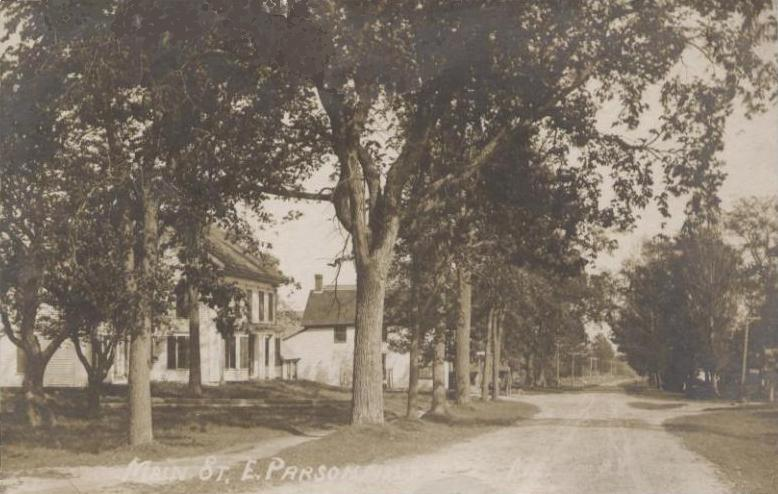
- East Parsonsfield in 1917

- Location within Maine
- Coordinates: 43°44′00″N 70°50′36″W
- Country: United States
- State: Maine
- County: York
- Elevation: 643 ft (196 m)
- Time zone: UTC-5 (Eastern (EST))
  - Summer (DST): UTC-4 (EDT)
- ZIP code: 04028
- Area code: 207
- GNIS feature ID: 565653

East Parsonsfield is an unincorporated village in the town of Parsonsfield, York County, Maine, United States. The community is located along Maine State Route 160 near the town's eastern border with Cornish. East Parsonsfield has a post office with ZIP code 04028.
