= Effingham, New Hampshire =

Town in New Hampshire, United States

- Town
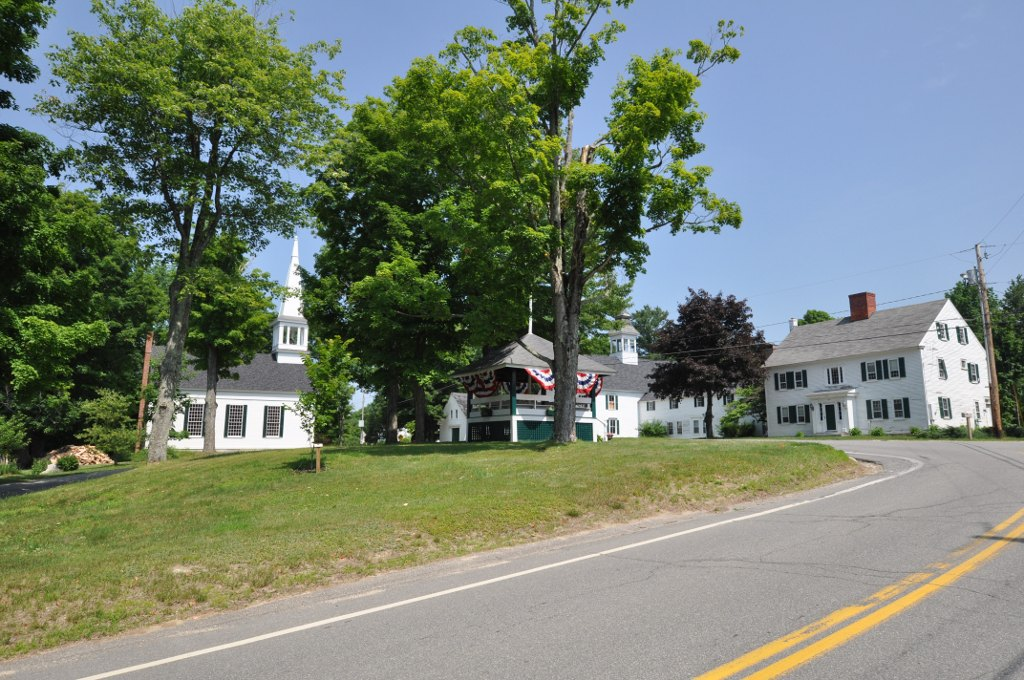
- Lord's Hill Historic District, one of the village centers of Effingham

- Seal

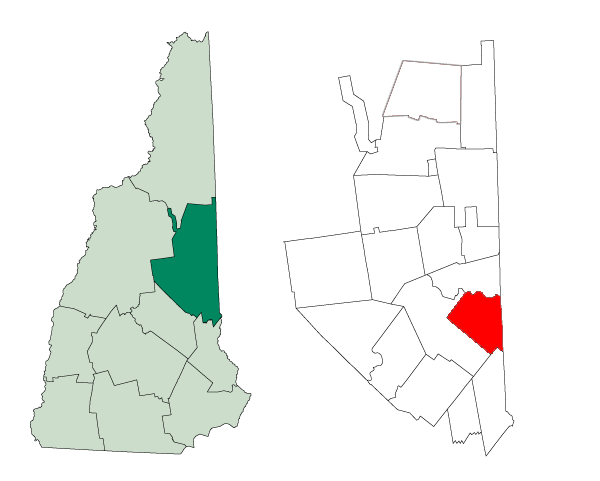
- Location in Carroll County, New Hampshire
- Coordinates: 43°44′54″N 71°03′20″W
- Country: United States
- State: New Hampshire
- County: Carroll
- Incorporated: 1778
- Villages: Effingham; Center Effingham; Effingham Falls; South Effingham

Area
  - Total: 39.9 sq mi (103.4 km^{2})
  - Land: 38.8 sq mi (100.4 km^{2})
  - Water: 1.2 sq mi (3.0 km^{2}) 2.87%
- Elevation: 548 ft (167 m)

Population (2020)
  - Total: 1,691
  - Density: 44/sq mi (16.8/km^{2})
- Time zone: UTC−5 (Eastern)
  - Summer (DST): UTC−4 (Eastern)
- ZIP Codes: 03882 (Effingham); 03864 (Ossipee)
- Area code: 603
- FIPS code: 33-23620
- GNIS feature ID: 873588
- Website: www.effinghamnh.net

Effingham is a town in Carroll County, New Hampshire, United States. The population was 1,691 at the 2020 census, and an estimated 1,819 in 2025, up from 1,465 at the 2010 census. Effingham includes the villages of Effingham Falls, Effingham (Lord's Hill), Center Effingham (Drake's Corner), and South Effingham. Pine River State Forest is in the south.

== History ==
The town was settled by members of the Leavitt family of Hampton, New Hampshire, led by Captain John Leavitt, a soldier whose father, Moses, was a prosperous Hampton tavern keeper. From them the settlement first took the name "Leavitt's Town". In 1749, the land was granted by Governor Benning Wentworth, and he renamed it "Effingham" for the Howard family, who were Earls of Effingham and who were related to the Wentworths by marriage. The town was incorporated in 1778.

North Effingham was set off in 1831 and incorporated as Freedom. By 1859, when the population was 1,252, Effingham Falls had developed into a small mill town, with a woolen factory, five sawmills, three gristmills, and a carriage factory.

Per a New Hampshire historical marker, number 83: Effingham was home to the first normal school in New Hampshire, established in 1830 on the second floor of the Effingham Union Academy building, erected in 1819. James W. Bradbury, later a U.S. senator from Maine, took charge of the school only on condition that it should be for the "instruction and training of teachers". The idea was his own and, at that time, entirely novel.

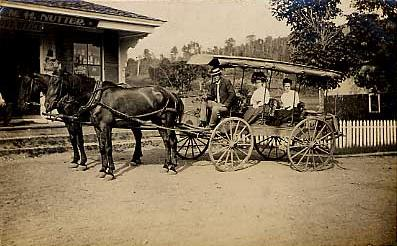
Post Office in 1908

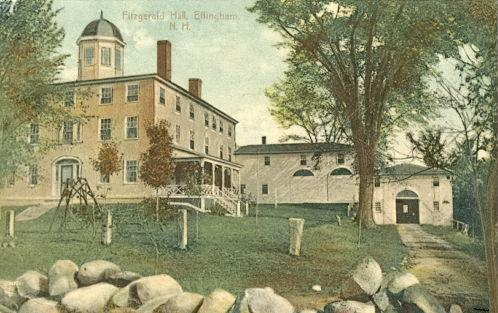
Lord Mansion in 1908

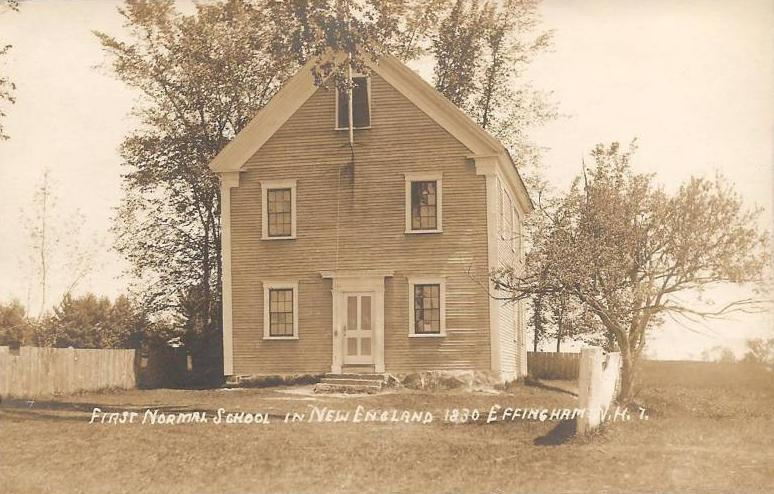
Normal School in 1910

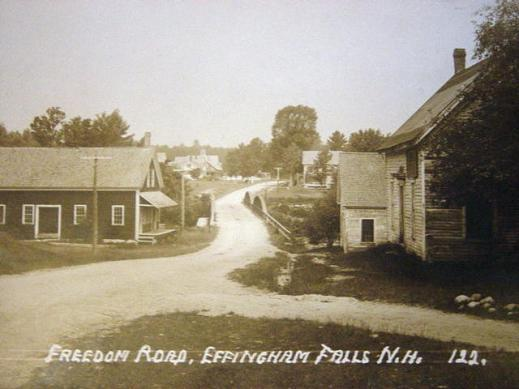
Effingham Falls in 1915

== Geography ==
According to the United States Census Bureau, the town of Effingham has a total area of 39.9 square miles (103.4 km^{2}), of which 38.8 square miles (100.4 km^{2}) are land and 1.2 square miles (3.0 km^{2}) are water, comprising 2.87% of the town. Green Mountain, elevation 1,884 feet (574 m), is the highest point in town. Effingham is drained by the Ossipee River and the Ossipee's tributaries, the Pine and South rivers. Province Lake lies partially within the town's borders to the south, and small portions of Ossipee Lake (Broad Bay and Berry Bay) are contained to the north. The community is bounded on the east by the Maine state line, and on the north by the Ossipee River. Effingham lies fully within the Saco River watershed. The Ossipee River subwatershed, partially in Effingham, is home to the largest stratified-drift aquifer in New Hampshire. Much of Effingham's land serves as aquifer recharge areas.

The town is served by state routes 25 and 153.

=== Adjacent municipalities ===
- Freedom (north)
- Parsonsfield, Maine (east)
- Wakefield (southeast)
- Ossipee (west)

== Demographics ==
Historical population
Census	Pop.	Note	%±
1790	154		—
1800	451		192.9%
1810	876		94.2%
1820	1,368		56.2%
1830	1,911		39.7%
1840	1,195		−37.5%
1850	1,252		4.8%
1860	1,209		−3.4%
1870	904		−25.2%
1880	865		−4.3%
1890	720		−16.8%
1900	600		−16.7%
1910	558		−7.0%
1920	393		−29.6%
1930	352		−10.4%
1940	377		7.1%
1950	341		−9.5%
1960	329		−3.5%
1970	360		9.4%
1980	599		66.4%
1990	941		57.1%
2000	1,273		35.3%
2010	1,465		15.1%
2020	1,691		15.4%
2024 (est.)	1,795		6.2%
U.S. Decennial Census

As of the census of 2000, there were 1,273 people, 490 households, and 336 families residing in the town. The population density was 33.0 inhabitants per square mile (12.7/km^{2}). There were 791 housing units at an average density of 20.5 per square mile (7.9/km^{2}). The racial makeup of the town was 98.35% White, 0.39% African American, 0.31% Native American, 0.24% Asian, 0.08% from other races, and 0.63% from two or more races. Hispanic or Latino of any race were 0.39% of the population.

There were 490 households, out of which 29.0% had children under the age of 18 living with them, 53.5% were married couples living together, 10.6% had a female householder with no husband present, and 31.4% were non-families. Of all households, 23.3% were made up of individuals, and 7.6% had someone living alone who was 65 years of age or older. The average household size was 2.43 and the average family size was 2.88.

In the town, the population was spread out, with 26.0% under the age of 18, 6.6% from 18 to 24, 29.2% from 25 to 44, 25.6% from 45 to 64, and 12.6% who were 65 years of age or older. The median age was 38 years. For every 100 females, there were 106.7 males. For every 100 females age 18 and over, there were 106.1 males.

The median income for a household in the town was $36,000, and the median income for a family was $38,000. Males had a median income of $29,650 versus $22,188 for females. The per capita income for the town was $17,089. About 8.1% of families and 15.3% of the population were below the poverty line, including 13.4% of those under age 18 and 6.3% of those age 65 or over.

== Notable person ==
- David Burbank (1821 – 1895), real estate investor; founder and namesake of Burbank, California; born in Effingham

== See also ==
- New England Masonic Charitable Institute
