= Robert Greenleaf Leavitt =

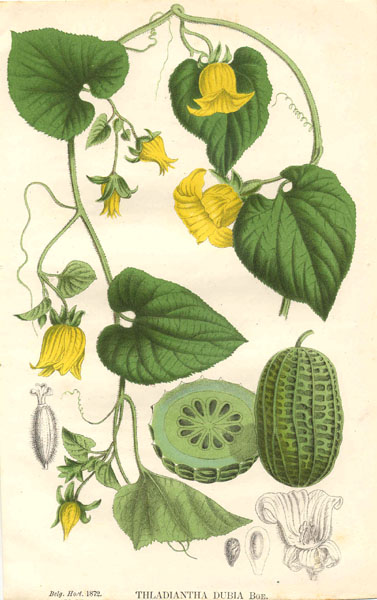
Early botanical illustration, 1872, unidentified 19th-century artist

Dr. Robert Greenleaf Leavitt (1865–1942) was an early American Harvard-educated botanist and widely published author in the field of botany, as well as an early college and high school educator in the natural sciences. Leavitt also worked for nine years as a botanical researcher at the Ames Botanical Laboratory in North Easton, Massachusetts.

== Biography ==
Dr. Leavitt was born in Parsonsfield, Maine. His parents were Susan Chapman Blazo and John Greenleaf Leavitt, a Congregational minister, who had been married in the early 1860s. Hean early botany professor at Harvard College, where he had graduated in the class of 1889 after attending Worcester Academy. Then went to Harvard College, living in Cambridge. While there he went in for athletics and became intercollegiate pole vault champion as well as a prize-winning jumper. He was graduated AB in June 1889. He taught school at DeVeaux School in Niagara Falls, N.Y., then at Williston Seminary in Easthampton, Mass. Following his Harvard education, Leavitt began publishing widely in the field of botany, including articles in The American Naturalist, The Botanical Gazette, Science magazine (the official publication of the American Association for the Advancement of Science), the Boston Society of Natural History magazine as well as other publications in the field. In 1899 Leavitt was named assistant professor at Harvard.

Leavitt subsequently earned his Doctor of Philosophy in biology at Harvard in 1904. He wrote Leavitt's Outlines of Botany,a standard text book at the time; it was published by the Harvard University Press. Leavitt spent some nine years at the Ames Botanical Laboratory in study, research, writing and collecting specimens, including trips to Cuba and Europe. Following his time at the Ames Botanical Laboratory, Leavitt became a high school botany teacher in Massachusetts and later in New Jersey. "College teaching is the least interesting," Leavitt wrote his Harvard classmates, "normal school the most interesting."

As the head of the biological department of the New Jersey Normal and Model Schools, Dr. Leavitt served as a high school teacher in Trenton, New Jersey, as well as overseeing statewide efforts to teach botany and the natural sciences.

"I expect to put in the rest of my time before I retire to my farm in Maine in helping to improve the schools of this State System," Leavitt wrote to his Harvard class. "At 60 I expect to retire for 40 years of research, with special reference to fruits adaptable to Maine, at my experiment station in a beautiful country among the foothills of the White Mountains. (My great great grandfather was a man of God-given taste in scenery)."

In the following years, Leavitt authored many textbooks in the field of botany, many for high school students, including his Outlines of Botany for the High School Laboratory and Classroom, which was widely reprinted.

Robert Greenleaf Leavitt was the son of John Greenleaf Leavitt, an early student at Parsonsfield Seminary at Parsonsfield, Maine, who returned to his alma mater in 1861 to serve as the school's principal for one year, when he married Susan C. Blazo, daughter of one of the Seminary's co-founders. (Dr. Leavitt served as a trustee for the Parsonsfield Seminary.) Rev. J. Greenleaf Leavitt later spent his life as a Congregationalist minister at Webster, Massachusetts. The home built by his wife's Blazo ancestors descended in the family of Rev. Greenleaf Leavitt. (The Blazo-Leavitt House is listed on the National Register of Historic Places.)

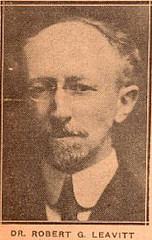
Dr. Robert Greenleaf Leavitt

Dr. Leavitt married Ida Gertrude (Ruggli) Leavitt, a 1901 graduate of Radcliffe College, at Arlington, Massachusetts in 1906, following the death of his first wife Janet (Shumway). Robert Greenleaf Leavitt and his first wife had two sons, Robert and Russell, both of whom attended Harvard College. Dr. Leavitt and his second wife Ida Ruggli had two daughters, Rosamund, who died in infancy, and Constance. Following his service as a high school teacher in New Jersey, Robert Greenleaf Leavitt retired to his farm in Maine, where he raised 40 varieties of apples.

== Books ==
- Robert Greenleaf Leavitt. Outlines of botany for the high school laboratory and classroom (based on Gray's Lessons in botany) 1901 [Hardcover]. Publisher: Facsimile Publisher (2015)
- Robert Greenleaf Leavitt. The Geographic Distribution Of Closely Related Species. Publisher: Nabu Press (13 April 2012)
- Robert Greenleaf Leavitt.The Forest Trees of New England. Publisher: The Arnold Arboretum of Harvard University (1932)
- Robert Greenleaf Leavitt.Trichomes of the Root in Vascular Cryptogams and Angiosperms (Classic Reprint). Publisher: Forgotten Books (26 Nov. 2016)
- Robert Greenleaf Leavitt.Proceedings of the Boston Society of Natural History, Vol. 31, No. 7, p.273-313, pl. 16-19; Trichomes of the Root in Vascular Cryptogams and Angiosperms. Publisher: Leopold Classic Library (20 Oct. 2015)

== See also ==
- Robert Keith Leavitt
- Blazo-Leavitt House
