= Lord's Hill Historic District =

Historic district in New Hampshire, United States

- U.S. National Register of Historic Places
- U.S. Historic district
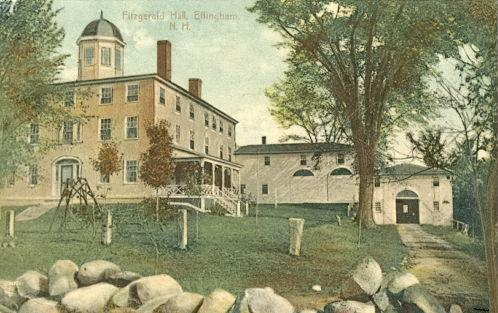
- The Isaac Lord Mansion, 1908 postcard view

- Location within New Hampshire Location within the United States
- Location: NH 153, Effingham, New Hampshire
- Coordinates: 43°45′49″N 70°59′51″W
- Area: 31.9 acres (12.9 ha)
- Architect: Multiple
- Architectural style: Greek Revival, Georgian, Federal
- NRHP reference No.: 85002162
- Added to NRHP: September 12, 1985

The Lord's Hill Historic District encompasses a historic village center in Effingham, New Hampshire. Located along New Hampshire Route 153 on a hill in northern Effingham, it is a well-preserved late 18th and early 19th-century rural village. It is named for Isaac Lord, a leading figure in its development in the early 19th century. The district was listed on the National Register of Historic Places in 1985.

== Description and history ==
The area that is now the village of Lord's Hill was first settled in the 1770s, its hilltop position located along one of the area's range roads (laid out by surveyors). The village became locally prominent in the 1790s, when Isaac Lord built his large Federal-style house, and operated a tavern there. He was instrumental in securing the town's meeting house for the village, which promoted further growth. In 1822 the Effingham Union Academy opened; its building is now a historical society property. The village has seen relatively little alteration since the mid-19th century.

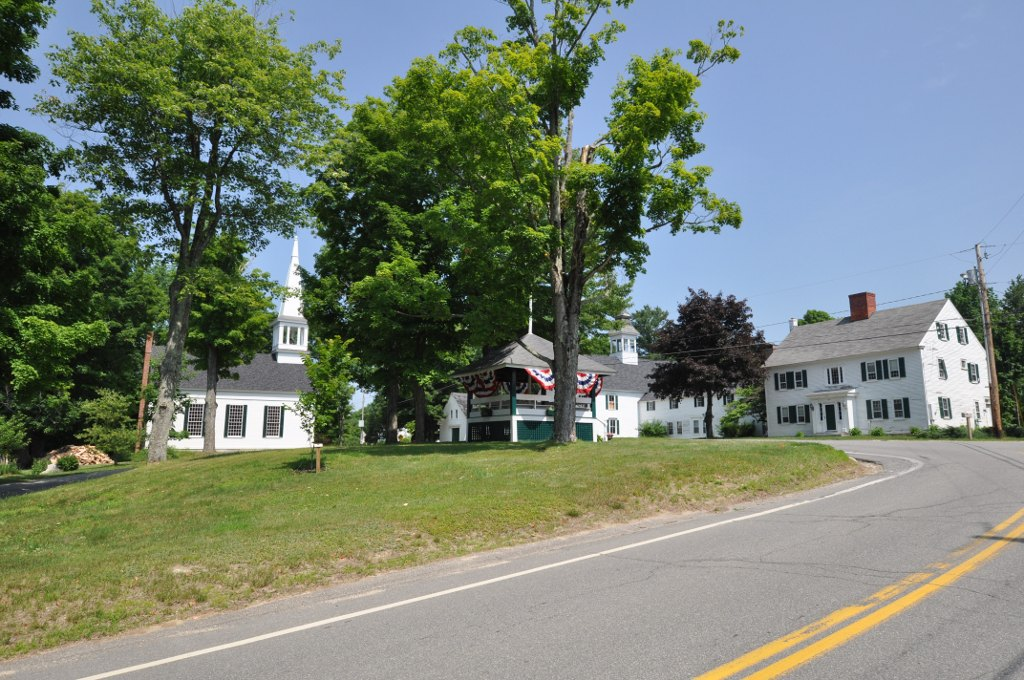
A more recent view of the district

The historic district covers about 32 acres (13 ha), extending from the junction of NH 153 with Plantation Road in the south (the latter a continuation of the historic range road) northward to another junction with Hobbs Road (also a continuation of the range road). It then extends for a short distance along both Hobbs Road and NH 153. At the southern junction is a triangular park around which houses and civic buildings, including the academy and church, are arrayed. The large and stylish house of Isaac Lord is set on the north side of NH 153 just east of the junction with Hobbs Road. Most of the district's 21 properties are residential properties; there are also five small cemeteries. The church was built by Isaac Lord in 1798, and extensively restyled in the 1840s to achieve its present Greek Revival appearance.

== See also ==
- National Register of Historic Places listings in Carroll County, New Hampshire
