= Ossipee River =

River in New Hampshire and Maine, United States

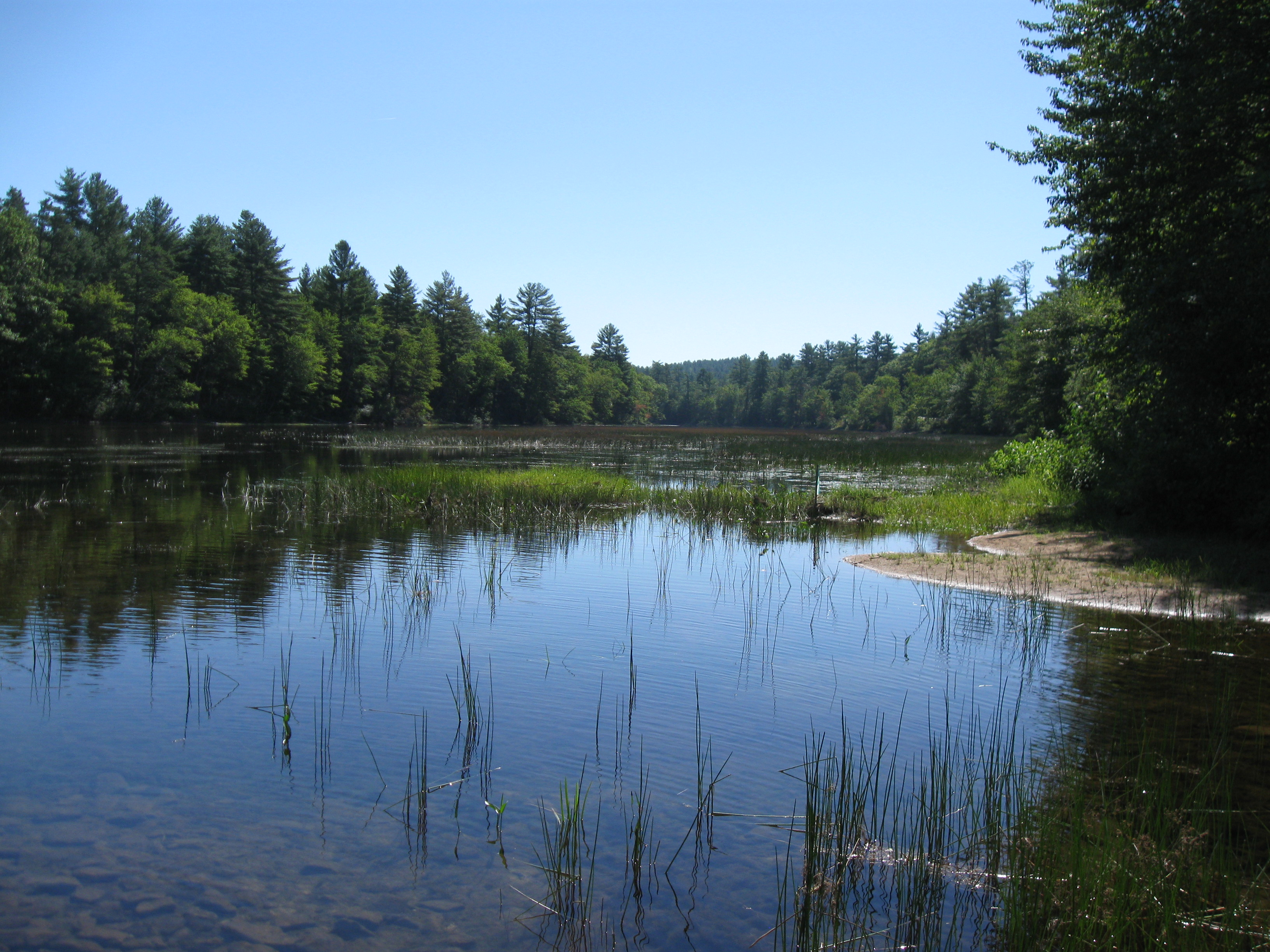
- The Ossipee River in Freedom, New Hampshire

- Location within New Hampshire Location within Maine Location within the United States

Location
- Country: United States
- States: New Hampshire, Maine
- Counties: Carroll, NH; Oxford, ME; York, ME
- Towns: Effingham, NH; Freedom, NH; Parsonsfield, ME; Porter, ME; Hiram, ME; Cornish, ME

Physical characteristics
- Source: Ossipee Lake
  - location: Effingham Falls, NH
  - coordinates: 43°47′38″N 71°3′48″W
  - elevation: 407 ft (124 m)
- Mouth: Saco River
  - location: Cornish, ME
  - coordinates: 43°48′49″N 70°46′58″W
  - elevation: 275 ft (84 m)
- Length: 18.3 mi (29.5 km)

Basin features
- Tributaries
  - left: Cold Brook, Mill Brook, Ridlon Brook, Wadsworth Brook
  - right: South River, Great Brook, Wedgwood Brook, Little River

The Ossipee River is an 18.3-mile-long (29.5 km) river in eastern New Hampshire and western Maine in the United States. It is a tributary of the Saco River, which flows southeast to the Atlantic Ocean at Saco, Maine.

The Ossipee River begins at the village of Effingham Falls, New Hampshire, at the outlet of Berry Bay, the farthest downstream of a chain of lakes connected to Ossipee Lake. The river, flowing east, forms the border between the towns of Effingham and Freedom. Entering Maine, the river continues to serve as a municipal boundary, first between Porter and Parsonsfield, and then between Hiram and Cornish. The river also forms the boundary between York County to the south and Oxford County to the north. Kezar Falls, a village in the town of Porter, forms a significant community along the river, with two dam impoundments.

Route 25 (New Hampshire and Maine) follows the river for its entire length.

== See also ==
- Little Ossipee River, a separate tributary of the Saco River
- List of rivers of New Hampshire
- List of rivers of Maine
