= Porter Old Meetinghouse =

Historic church in Maine, United States

- U.S. National Register of Historic Places
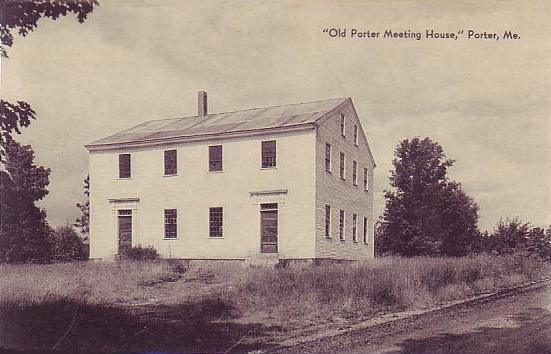
- Postcard view, c. 1922

- Location within Maine Location within the United States
- Nearest city: Porter, Maine
- Coordinates: 43°49′5″N 70°56′50″W
- Area: 1 acre (0.40 ha)
- Built: 1818
- NRHP reference No.: 73000267
- Added to NRHP: April 02, 1973

The Porter Old Meetinghouse is a historic meeting house on Old Meetinghouse Road in Porter, Maine, United States. Built in 1818-24, it is a well-preserved example of a meeting house in rural Maine, serving as a center of local religious and civic activities. The building was listed on the National Register of Historic Places in 1973.

== Description and history ==
The meetinghouse is a wood frame structure, 2-1/2 stories in height, with a side gable roof and a granite foundation. It is 44.5 feet (13.6 m) wide and about 36.5 feet (11.1 m) deep, with four bays on each side. The main facade first floor has doorways in the outer bays and windows on the inner bays, with sash windows in all of the remaining bays. There are also two smaller sash windows in the gable ends. The walls are clapboarded, and the roof is corrugated metal. The two doorways, each reached by granite steps, are flanked by pilasters and topped by four-light transom windows, with an entablature above.

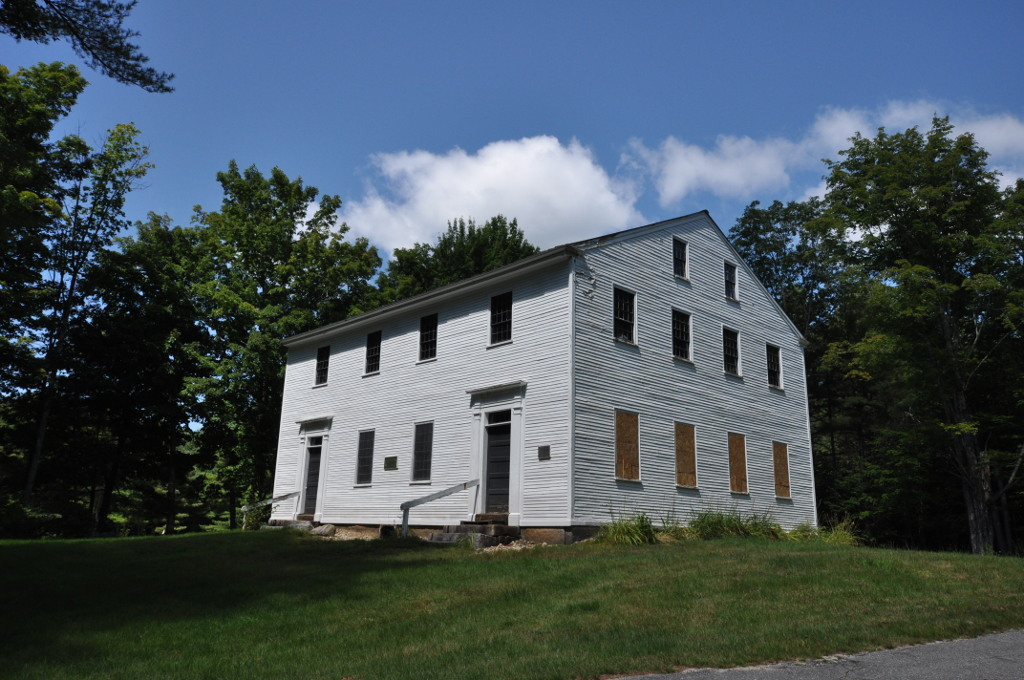
The meetinghouse in 2014

The interior is essentially a single large chamber with a gallery on three sides. The walls are plaster, much of it original, with trowel marks visible. The main floor is populated with original box pews. The pulpit is not original, having been reconstructed from plans made by the Historic American Buildings Survey in 1969, using parts from the original.

Main construction of the meetinghouse was completed in 1818-19, although it was not completely finished until 1824. The original congregation was a Freewill Baptist organization led by Reverend Jeremiah Bullock, and were known locally as "Bullockites". The building has also been used for municipal functions. It is presently owned by the Town of Porter.

== See also ==
- National Register of Historic Places listings in Oxford County, Maine
