= Parsonsfield, Maine =

Town in Maine, United States

- Town
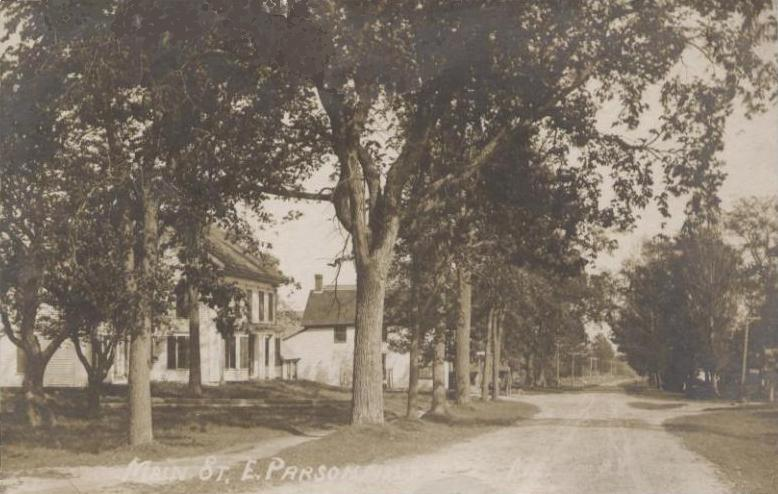
- East Parsonsfield in 1917

- Location within the state of Maine
- Coordinates: 43°44′08″N 70°54′40″W
- Country: United States
- State: Maine
- County: York
- Incorporated: 1785

Area
  - Total: 59.91 sq mi (155.17 km^{2})
  - Land: 58.89 sq mi (152.52 km^{2})
  - Water: 1.02 sq mi (2.64 km^{2})
- Elevation: 860 ft (260 m)

Population (2020)
  - Total: 1,791
  - Density: 30/sq mi (11.7/km^{2})
- Time zone: UTC-5 (Eastern (EST))
  - Summer (DST): UTC-4 (EDT)
- ZIP Codes: 04047 (Parsonsfield); 04028 (East Parsonsfield)
- Area code: 207
- FIPS code: 23-56870
- GNIS feature ID: 582662
- Website: https://www.parsonsfield.org/

Parsonsfield is a town in York County, Maine, United States. The population was 1,791 at the 2020 census. Parsonsfield includes the villages of Kezar Falls, Parsonsfield, and North, East and South Parsonsfield. It is part of the Portland-South Portland-Biddeford metropolitan area.

== History ==
This was part of a large tract of land sold on November 28, 1668, by Newichewannock Indian Chief Sunday (or Wesumbe) to Francis Small, a trader from Kittery. The price was two large Indian blankets, two gallons of rum, two pounds of gunpowder, four pounds of musket balls and twenty strings of Indian beads. Small then sold half his interest to Major Nicholas Shapleigh of what is now Eliot. In 1771, heirs sold the township to Thomas Parsons and 39 associates, upon which it was surveyed into 100-acre (0.40 km^{2}) lots. Called Parsonstown Plantation, it was first settled in 1772 by 12 families.

On August 29, 1785, the town was incorporated as Parsonsfield after Thomas Parsons, one of the largest proprietors. The Blazo-Leavitt House, a fine example of the Federal style, was built in 1812. Parsonsfield Seminary was founded in 1832 and closed in 1949.

The surface of the town is rough and hilly, its soil rocky but fertile for farming. Chief crops were grain and hay. Mills were built at pond outlets and on the South River. The largest water power source was on the Ossipee River at Kezar Falls, where the village of Kezar Falls straddled the stream into Porter. Parsonsfield had seven sawmills and seven gristmills. In 1880, John Devereux and George W. Towle built the Kezar Falls Woolen Mill, a woolen textile factory which became the most important business in Parsonsfield.

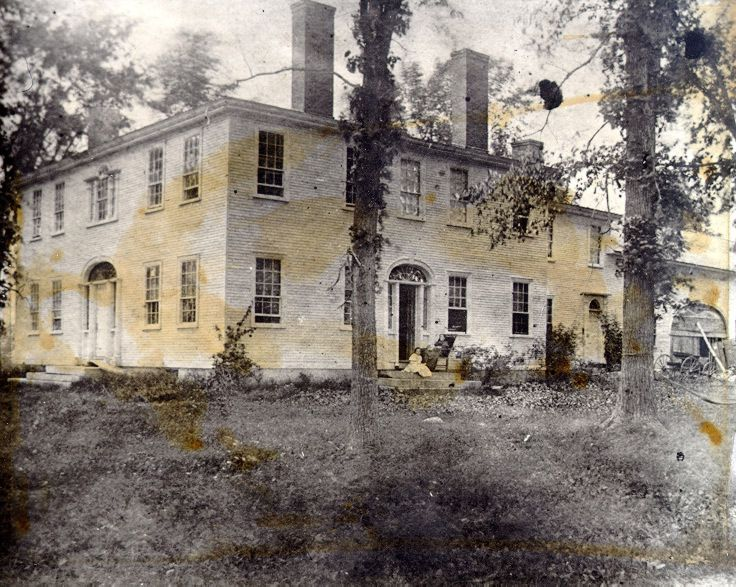
Blazo-Leavitt House c. 1900

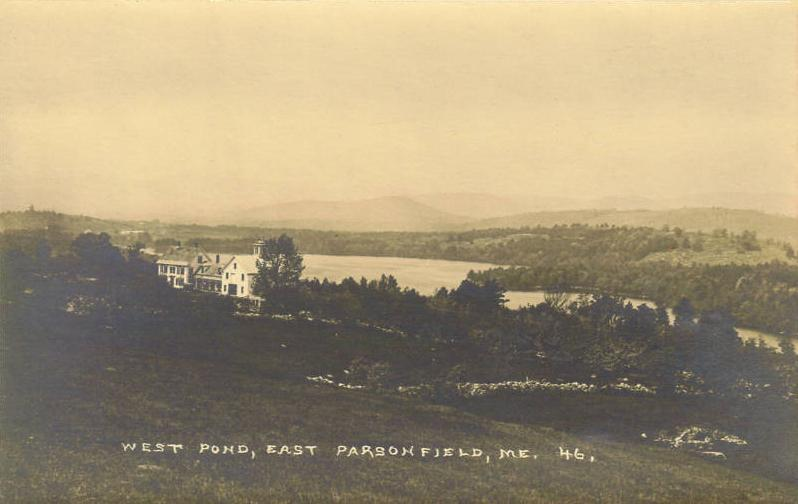
West Pond c. 1915

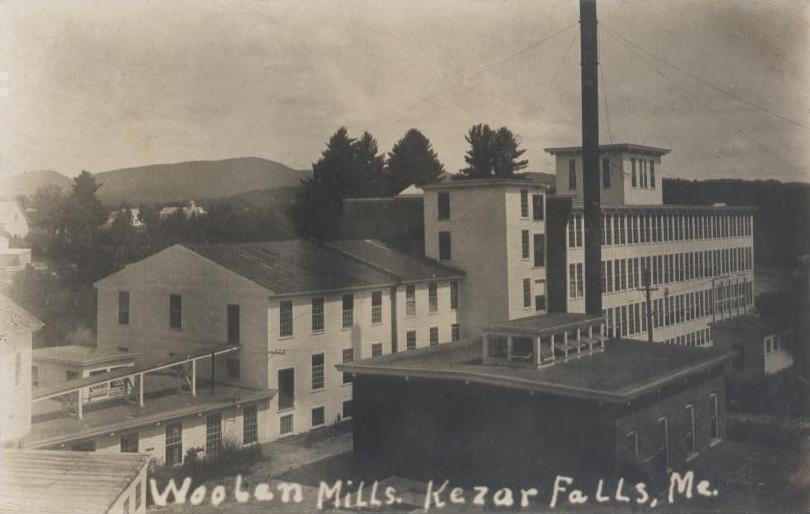
Kezar Falls Woolen Co. mill in 1907

== Geography ==
According to the United States Census Bureau, the town has a total area of 59.91 square miles (155.17 km^{2}), of which 58.89 square miles (152.52 km^{2}) is land and 1.02 square miles (2.64 km^{2}) is water. Parsonsfield is drained by the South River and Ossipee River. The town's highest point is Wiggin Mountain, 1,300 feet (400 m) above sea level.

The town is crossed by state routes 25, 160, and NH 153. It is bordered by Effingham and Wakefield, New Hampshire to the west, Porter and Hiram to the north, Cornish and Limerick to the east, and Newfield to the south.

== Demographics ==
Historical population
Census	Pop.	Note	%±
1790	654		—
1800	1,350		106.4%
1810	1,763		30.6%
1820	2,355		33.6%
1830	2,492		5.8%
1840	2,442		−2.0%
1850	2,322		−4.9%
1860	2,125		−8.5%
1870	1,894		−10.9%
1880	1,613		−14.8%
1890	1,398		−13.3%
1900	1,131		−19.1%
1910	1,057		−6.5%
1920	1,062		0.5%
1930	897		−15.5%
1940	946		5.5%
1950	958		1.3%
1960	869		−9.3%
1970	971		11.7%
1980	1,089		12.2%
1990	1,472		35.2%
2000	1,584		7.6%
2010	1,898		19.8%
2020	1,791		−5.6%
U.S. Decennial Census

=== 2020 Census ===
As of the census of 2020, there were 1,791 people, 694 households, and 508 families residing in the town. The population density was 30 inhabitants per square mile (11.7/km2). There were 1,166 housing units in total. The racial makeup of the town was 94.1% White, 0.3% African American, 0.5% Native American, 0.5% Asian, 0.4% from other races, and 4.2% from two or more races. Hispanic or Latino of any race were 1.3% of the population.

There were 694 households, of which 20.6% had children under the age of 18 living with them, 54% were married couples living together, 26.1% had a female householder with no husband present, 15.6% had a male householder with no wife present, and 26.8% were non-families. 22.5% of all households were made up of individuals, and 8.8% had someone living alone who was 65 years of age or older. The average household size was 2.48 and the average family size was 2.92.

=== 2010 census ===
As of the census of 2010, there were 1,898 people, 764 households, and 514 families residing in the town. The population density was 32.2 inhabitants per square mile (12.4/km^{2}). There were 1,174 housing units at an average density of 19.9 per square mile (7.7/km^{2}). The racial makeup of the town was 97.0% White, 0.2% African American, 0.4% Native American, 0.4% Asian, 0.4% from other races, and 1.7% from two or more races. Hispanic or Latino of any race were 1.1% of the population.

There were 764 households, of which 29.5% had children under the age of 18 living with them, 49.5% were married couples living together, 11.9% had a female householder with no husband present, 5.9% had a male householder with no wife present, and 32.7% were non-families. 24.6% of all households were made up of individuals, and 8.6% had someone living alone who was 65 years of age or older. The average household size was 2.48 and the average family size was 2.89.

The median age in the town was 42.4 years. 22.4% of residents were under the age of 18; 7% were between the ages of 18 and 24; 24.3% were from 25 to 44; 31.5% were from 45 to 64; and 14.8% were 65 years of age or older. The gender makeup of the town was 50.3% male and 49.7% female.

=== 2000 census ===
As of the census of 2000, there were 1,584 people, 634 households, and 438 families residing in the town. The population density was 26.9 inhabitants per square mile (10.4/km^{2}). There were 996 housing units at an average density of 16.9 per square mile (6.5/km^{2}). The racial makeup of the town was 98.17% White, 0.13% African American, 0.25% Native American, 0.19% Asian, 0.06% from other races, and 1.20% from two or more races. Hispanic or Latino of any race were 0.82% of the population.

There were 634 households, out of which 30.6% had children under the age of 18 living with them, 54.7% were married couples living together, 9.3% had a female householder with no husband present, and 30.8% were non-families. 24.3% of all households were made up of individuals, and 10.6% had someone living alone who was 65 years of age or older. The average household size was 2.48 and the average family size was 2.89.

In the town, the population was spread out, with 25.4% under the age of 18, 5.8% from 18 to 24, 28.2% from 25 to 44, 25.3% from 45 to 64, and 15.3% who were 65 years of age or older. The median age was 39 years. For every 100 females, there were 99.7 males. For every 100 females age 18 and over, there were 96.8 males.

The median income for a household in the town was $32,214, and the median income for a family was $36,016. Males had a median income of $30,815 versus $20,917 for females. The per capita income for the town was $16,968. About 10.5% of families and 12.1% of the population were below the poverty line, including 14.0% of those under age 18 and 9.4% of those age 65 or over.

== Geographical description in 1888 ==
Note: The following section is largely copied from the book "History of Parsonsfield, Maine: 1771–1888," published by Brown Thurston & Company, 1888.

The town of Parsonsfield is in the extreme northwest corner of York County, Maine. Center Square, on the northern slope of Cedar Mountain, is about 30 miles (48 km) from the ocean, at Old Orchard and thirty-two from Wells Beach on an air line, and 33 miles (53 km) west-north-west from Portland.

Its northern boundary is the Great Ossipee River (Ossipee signifies "River of Pines" in the Indian dialect.) The towns of Porter and Hiram are north of the river. Effingham and Wakefield, NH, are on the western border, Newfield is on the south, Limerick and Cornish on the east. The outer lines of the town have been measured several times, giving an area from 62.23 to 64 square miles (161 to 166 km^{2}). The length of the western line is nearly 8.5 miles (8.0 km), the eastern something over 9 miles (14 km), the northern and southern about 7.3 miles (4.8 km).

The surface of Parsonsfield is quite broken, or more properly, rises into high swells. Ricker's Mountain, in the southwest, is the highest, it being not far from 1,600 feet (490 m) above the level of the sea. Cedar Mountain, in the center, comes up within one hundred feet of Ricker's, while Randall's Mountain in the east, may fall 100 feet (30 m) below Cedar. The Seminary varies but little from 1,200 feet (370 m) above sea level, while the average altitude of the town is estimated at 1,000 feet (300 m). After Parsonsfield Seminary burned in 1854, Bates College was founded as a replacement.

Ricker's Mountain takes its name from Dea. Dominicus Ricker, who lived and died near the summit. Cedar is so called from the mountain cedar growing there. A legend tells how a hunter named Randall perished from cold on the mountain called by his name. Another tradition goes something like this: "Many years ago a famous hunter, named Randall, hunted hereaway among these mountains and caught much game. He usually reposed on the top of the high mountain by the rivulet, where it is supposed he was murdered by another hunter for his furs. The supposed murderer was absent only a few days from the settlements and returned heavily laden with valuable skins."

The high ridge, of which Cedar Mountain is the apex, runs east and west across the town. It is the water-shed, or divide, between the Great and Little Ossipee Rivers. The town is dotted all over with hills and swells, some of them hard to climb, but generally productive.

The principal river is the Great Ossipee. By estimation, the average yearly discharge is nine billion cubic feet (8 m^{3}/s), the length 33 miles (53 km), draining an area of about 240 square miles (620 km^{2}). There is an excellent water power at Kezar Falls, the descent being 50 feet per mile (9.5 m/km).

South River is next in size. It enters the Ossipee above Porter Bridge. The privilege at Lord's mills is the best within the town. The Bickford and Blaisdall mill streams run into the Little Ossipee. Smaller brooks are found in all parts of the town. It would be hard to find a lot of land not having one or more living springs, and as many never failing rivulets.

A small part of Province Pond is in Parsonsfield. The state line is one-quarter of an mile (0.40 km) from the eastern shore, and the distance across, by that line, is about one mile (1.6 km). Long Pond, in the northeast, is a beautiful sheet of water, 1.5 miles (2.4 km) long, and about one-third (800 m) that in width. West Pond, separated from Long Pond by a ridge, is nearly half as large. Smaller ponds are found among the hills.

Coarse granite rock projects here and there, but surface ledges cover only a small part of the town. Less than half the wells extend down to the rock bed. The prevailing soil may be denominated granite. There are patches of sand, but clay, even of inferior quality, is scarce. From one to two feet (300 to 600 mm) below the surface there is a hard pan or subsoil.

Parsonfield does not have many swamps or bog meadows. The geography instead lends itself to many brooks and rivers.

There are very few farms without stones enough to fence them. A large surplus of this imperishable fence material is the rule.

The original forest growth was maple, beech, hemlock, pine, birch, oak, and ash, with scores of other trees interspersed. Each variety prevailing in its favored locality, but not holding exclusive possession of a single farm. Where a second growth has been allowed to spring up, the soft woods in many cases have succeeded the hard, while the hard has been followed by soft. It is known that the present growth is a little more mixed than the first.

Roughly 20 percent of the town of Parsonsfield falls within the 8,603-acre (34.82 km^{2}) Leavitt Plantation Forest, the largest contiguous block of forest land south of Sebago Lake. When the tract of forest was slated to be sold into smaller parcels, the Nature Conservancy and the state of Maine intervened, purchasing a conservation easement on the entire parcel and keeping it intact. That easement will protect Leavitt Plantation in perpetuity, while allowing sustainable forestry practices.

== Local schools ==
- Sacopee Valley Middle School
- Sacopee Valley High School

== Sites of interest ==
- Parsonsfield-Porter Bridge, a 2 span covered bridge built in 1876
- Parsonsfield-Porter Historical Society & Museum (in Porter)
- West End House Boys Camp - on Long Pond since 1908. Founded by James Storrow. Attended by Leonard Nimoy, Dan Andelman, Reggie Bird (basketball player), Louis Kane (former owner of Au Bon Pain), Hatchet Harry, musician “Yonas” and musician Jeremy Zucker.

== Notable people ==
Parsonsfield Seminary building, erected 1857 after the original burnt in 1854

- James W. Bradbury, senator
- Contessa Brewer, news anchor
- Nathaniel Burbank, journalist
- John Buzzell, clergyman, writer
- Oren B. Cheney, clergyman, educator
- Carolyn Chute, writer
- Luther Orlando Emerson, musician, composer, music publisher
- Charles Augustus Hilton, preacher
- Louise Lamprey, writer, journalist
- Jerry Korn, pilot, author
- Robert Greenleaf Leavitt, botanist
- Rufus McIntire, US congressman
- Daniel Page, politician, businessman
- Alzina Parson Stevens, labor leader
- Lorenzo De Medici Sweat, US congressman
- Amos Tuck, US congressman
