= Newichawannock Canal =

Canal in Maine and New Hampshire, US

- Great Falls Company Newichawannock Canal Historic District
- U.S. National Register of Historic Places
- U.S. Historic district
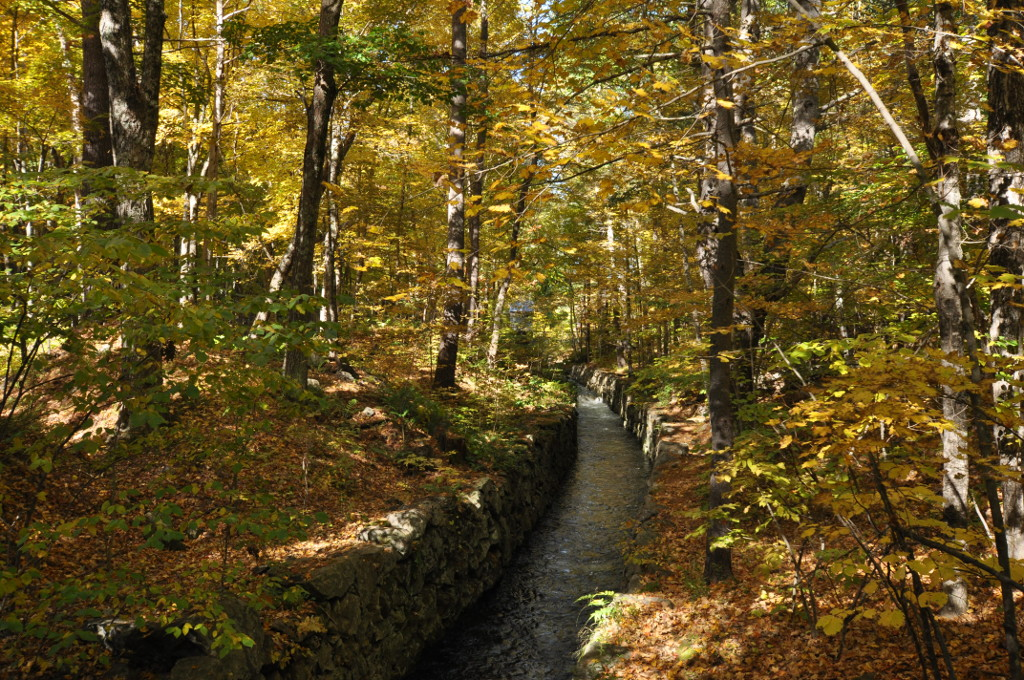

- Location within New Hampshire Location within Maine Location within the United States
- Location: Wakefield, New Hampshire and Acton, Maine
- Coordinates: 43°34′10″N 70°58′16″W
- Built: c. 1850
- NRHP reference No.: 14000460
- Added to NRHP: August 6, 2014

The Newichawannock Canal is a man-made canal which drains Great East Lake into Horn Pond at the border between Wakefield, New Hampshire, and Acton, Maine, in the northeastern United States. It is at the head of the Salmon Falls River, which the Abenaki called Newichawannock, meaning "river with many falls". Begun in 1850 by the Great Falls Company to increase the water available for its mills in Somersworth, New Hampshire, the 0.75-mile (1.21 km) canal is unusual as it was built for strictly industrial purposes in an area remote from the actual industrial site. The canal forms the boundary between the states of New Hampshire and Maine, and is spanned by a stone bridge built at the same time. The canal and bridge, along with related artifacts, were listed on the National Register of Historic Places in 2014.

== Description and history ==
The Newichawannock Canal is located between Great East Lake to the north and Horn Pond to the south, on the southern portion of the north–south border between Maine and New Hampshire. The canal is 13 feet (4.0 m) wide and about 16 feet (4.9 m) deep, and is lined with unmortared stone. An unmortared stone-arch bridge, built at the same time, carries Canal Road over the waterway. Also located in the area are piles of stone, apparently left over from the canal construction, and a second canal that lies submerged in Great East Lake. Horn Pond is the source of the Salmon Falls River, a tributary of the Piscataqua River, both of which form the New Hampshire-Maine border south of the pond.

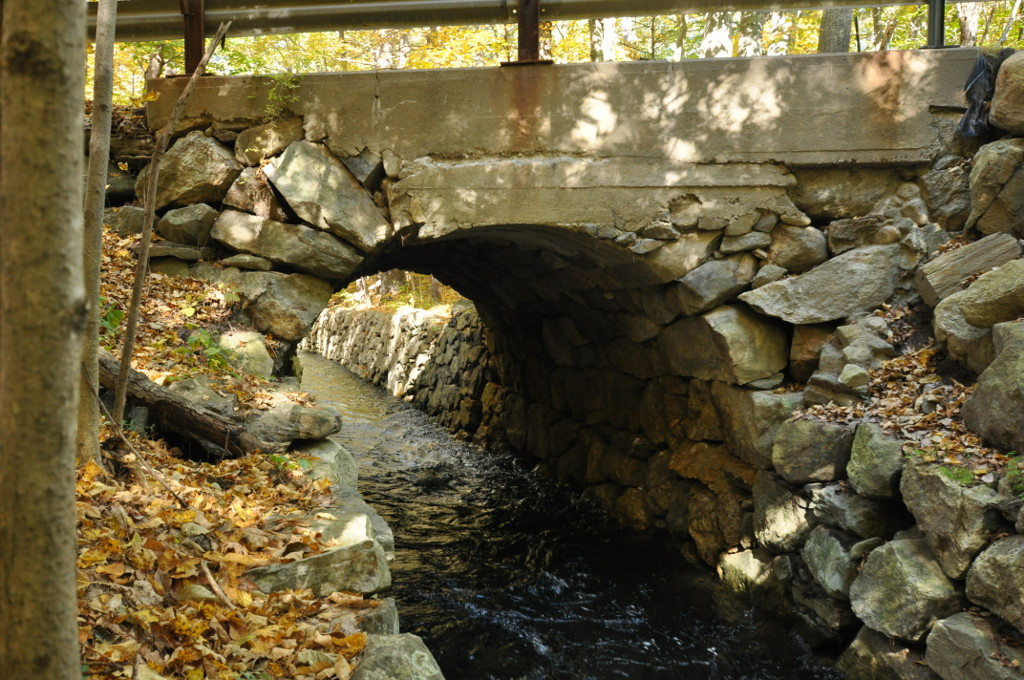
The bridge over the canal

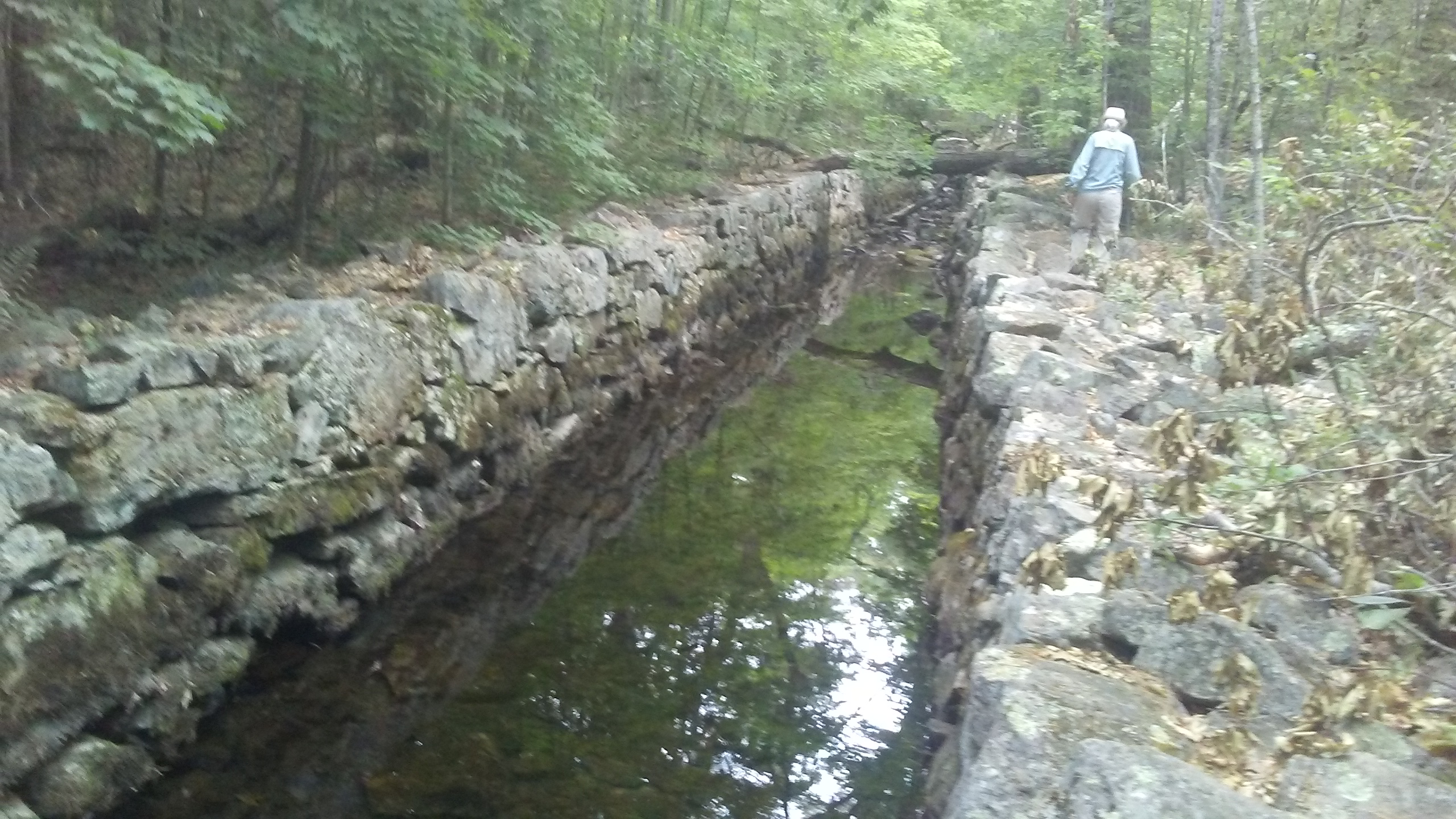
A portion of the canal, June 2020

The Great Falls Company was founded in 1823 to operate textile mills using the water power of the Salmon Falls River at Somersworth, New Hampshire. By about 1860 the mill complex there had grown to include six large buildings and employed 1,500 workers. In order to increase water flow at the mills, the company purchased water rights at Great East Lake and Horn Pond, and began construction of the canal in the 1850s. Other mills, such as Cocheco Woolen Mills in East Rochester, benefited in subsequent decades. The canal was not completed until the 1860s due in part to the Civil War. The canal was built by Hiram Paul, a civil engineer who lived in Wakefield and operated a tavern.

As of 2020, the northern half of the canal is largely blocked by collapsed sides but the southern half is navigable, reached from Horn Pond. The Great East Lake Improvement Association has a "Save the Newichawannock Canal" program.

== See also ==
- National Register of Historic Places listings in Carroll County, New Hampshire
- National Register of Historic Places listings in York County, Maine
