= Jones Brook =

- Location within New Hampshire Location within the United States

Location
- Country: United States
- State: New Hampshire
- Counties: Carroll, Strafford
- Towns: Brookfield, Middleton, Milton

Physical characteristics
- Source: Moose Mountains
  - location: Brookfield
  - coordinates: 43°30′34″N 71°6′15″W
  - elevation: 1,000 ft (300 m)
- Mouth: Branch River
  - location: Milton
  - coordinates: 43°28′57″N 71°0′24″W
  - elevation: 420 ft (130 m)
- Length: 10.6 mi (17.1 km)

Basin features
- Tributaries
  - left: Horn Brook
  - right: Hart Brook

Jones Brook is a 10.6-mile-long (17.1 km) stream in eastern New Hampshire in the United States. It is a tributary of the Branch River, which leads to the Salmon Falls River, part of the Piscataqua River watershed leading to the Atlantic Ocean.

Jones Brook rises in the Moose Mountains, on the border between Brookfield and Middleton, New Hampshire, and flows southeast through Middleton. Upon entering Milton, the stream turns back to the north and joins the Branch River downstream from the village of Union.

== See also ==
- List of rivers of New Hampshire
