= Middleton, New Hampshire =

- Town
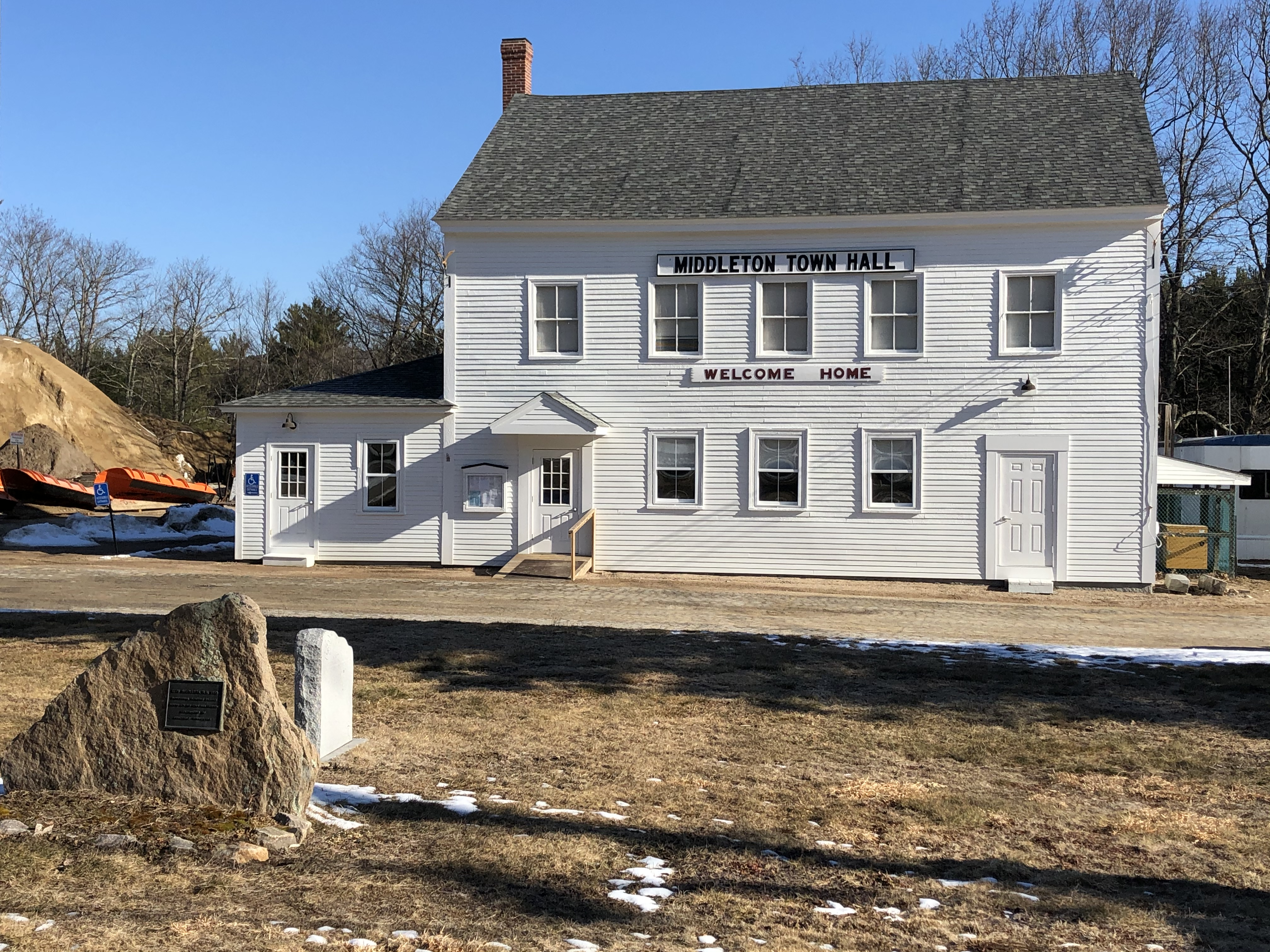
- Historic Middleton Town Hall in 2020

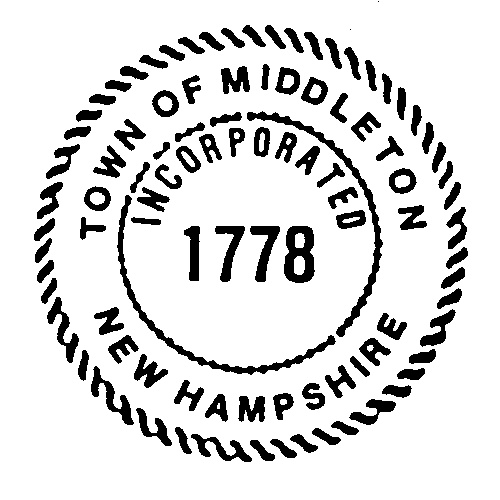
- Seal

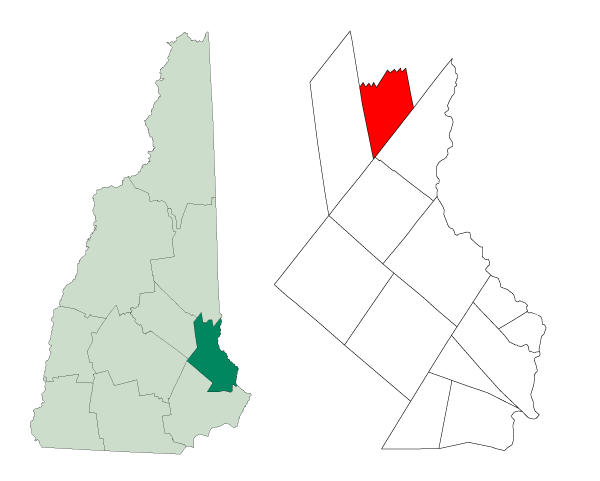
- Location within Strafford County, New Hampshire
- Coordinates: 43°28′59″N 71°04′07″W
- Country: United States
- State: New Hampshire
- County: Strafford
- Settled: 1749
- Incorporated: 1778
- Village: Middleton Corners

Area
  - Total: 18.5 sq mi (47.9 km^{2})
  - Land: 18.1 sq mi (46.8 km^{2})
  - Water: 0.42 sq mi (1.1 km^{2})
- Elevation: 715 ft (218 m)

Population (2020)
  - Total: 1,823
  - Density: 101/sq mi (38.9/km^{2})
- Time zone: UTC-5 (EST)
  - Summer (DST): UTC-4 (EDT)
- ZIP code: 03887
- Area code: 603
- FIPS code: 33-47700
- GNIS feature ID: 873664
- Website: www.middletonnh.gov

Middleton is a town in Strafford County, New Hampshire, United States. The population was 1,823 at the 2020 census.

== History ==
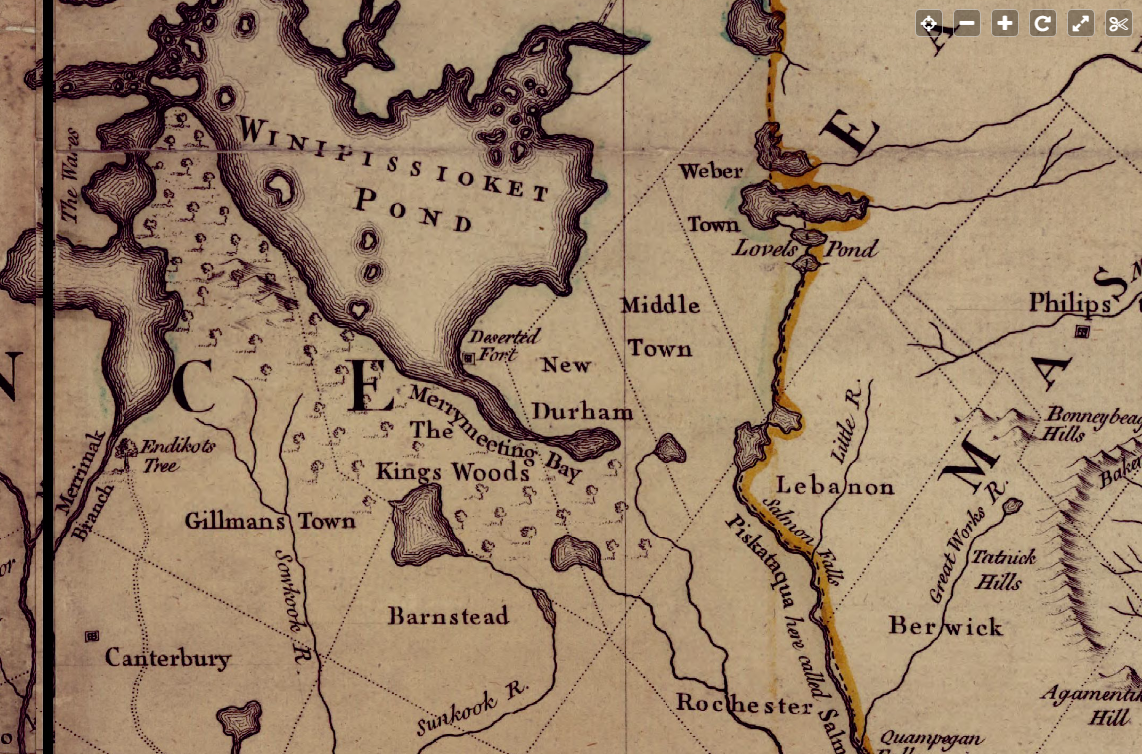
Middle Town, New Hampshire, from 1755 map

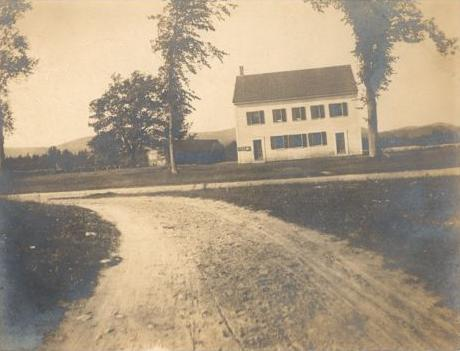
Town Hall in 1907

Granted by the Masonian Proprietors in 1749, the town was named after Sir Charles Middleton, 1st Baron Barham, who was in charge of convoy service between Barbados and the colonies. The land was first settled shortly before the Revolutionary War by settlers from Lee and Rochester. Soon after the war, its population was challenged when a number of Quaker families led by the town auditor, Nicholas Austin, left for the more peaceful setting of Austin, Quebec. Although the soil is rocky and unsuited for cultivation, cider was made in considerable quantities, and maple syrup to some extent.

Middleton was situated on the road between the New Hampshire Seacoast and Wolfeboro, the location of colonial governor John Wentworth's summer home, "Kingswood". (Today the road survives as "Governors Road" in northern Rochester and Milton and continues as "Kings Highway" through Middleton.) Neglect of the road caused the governor to bill the proprietors for repairs he had to make for safe travel to Kingswood, built in 1771. Middleton was incorporated on March 4, 1778, and originally included Brookfield, which was split off in December 1794.

Middleton's old Town Hall, located on King's Highway, was built in 1795 as a meetinghouse on Ridge Road. It was moved to its current location in 1812, jacked-up on the new site, and the Town Hall added underneath. The original stucco painting, a wrap-around landscape mural of trees and scenery, was painted by John Avery in 1811 and touched up in 1841.

== Geography ==
According to the United States Census Bureau, the town has a total area of 18.5 square miles (47.9 km^{2}), of which 18.1 square miles (46.8 km^{2}) are land and 0.42 square miles (1.1 km^{2}) are water, comprising 2.33% of the town. That water is primarily contained by Sunrise Lake, previously known as the Old Dump Reservoir, near the southern corner of the town. Sunrise Lake drains south toward the Cocheco River in Farmington, while the rest of the town drains eastward toward the Branch River, a tributary of the Salmon Falls River. Jones Brook flows through the center of town and joins the Branch River in the northern part of Milton. The entire town is part of the Piscataqua River watershed. The Moose Mountains, which separate Middleton from Brookfield, have a series of 1,600-to-1,700-foot (490 to 520 m) peaks, including the highest point in Middleton at an elevation of 1,670 feet (510 m) above sea level.

The town is served by New Hampshire Route 153.

== Demographics ==
Historical population
Census	Pop.	Note	%±
1790	617		—
1800	431		−30.1%
1810	439		1.9%
1820	482		9.8%
1830	562		16.6%
1840	483		−14.1%
1850	476		−1.4%
1860	530		11.3%
1870	476		−10.2%
1880	355		−25.4%
1890	207		−41.7%
1900	300		44.9%
1910	291		−3.0%
1920	174		−40.2%
1930	176		1.1%
1940	236		34.1%
1950	255		8.1%
1960	349		36.9%
1970	430		23.2%
1980	734		70.7%
1990	1,183		61.2%
2000	1,440		21.7%
2010	1,783		23.8%
2020	1,823		2.2%
U.S. Decennial Census

As of the census of 2000, there were 1,440 people, 514 households, and 389 families residing in the town. The population density was 79.6 inhabitants per square mile (30.7/km^{2}). There were 706 housing units at an average density of 39.0 per square mile (15.1/km^{2}). The racial makeup of the town was 98.54% White, 0.14% African American, 0.21% Native American, 0.56% Asian, and 0.56% from two or more races. Hispanic or Latino of any race were 0.35% of the population.

There were 514 households, out of which 38.1% had children under the age of 18 living with them, 63.0% were married couples living together, 6.6% had a female householder with no husband present, and 24.3% were non-families. 16.5% of all households were made up of individuals, and 3.9% had someone living alone who was 65 years of age or older. The average household size was 2.80 and the average family size was 3.13.

In the town, the population was spread out, with 28.8% under the age of 18, 6.5% from 18 to 24, 34.1% from 25 to 44, 20.3% from 45 to 64, and 10.3% who were 65 years of age or older. The median age was 37 years. For every 100 females, there were 110.8 males. For every 100 females age 18 and over, there were 106.4 males.

The median income for a household in the town was $43,942, and the median income for a family was $48,529. Males had a median income of $32,014 versus $26,336 for females. The per capita income for the town was $18,415. About 4.5% of families and 7.3% of the population were below the poverty line, including 5.6% of those under age 18 and 6.3% of those age 65 or over.

== Adjacent municipalities ==
- Brookfield (north)
- Wakefield (northeast)
- Milton (southeast)
- Farmington (south)
- New Durham (west)
