= Horn Pond =

Pond in Maine and New Hampshire, US

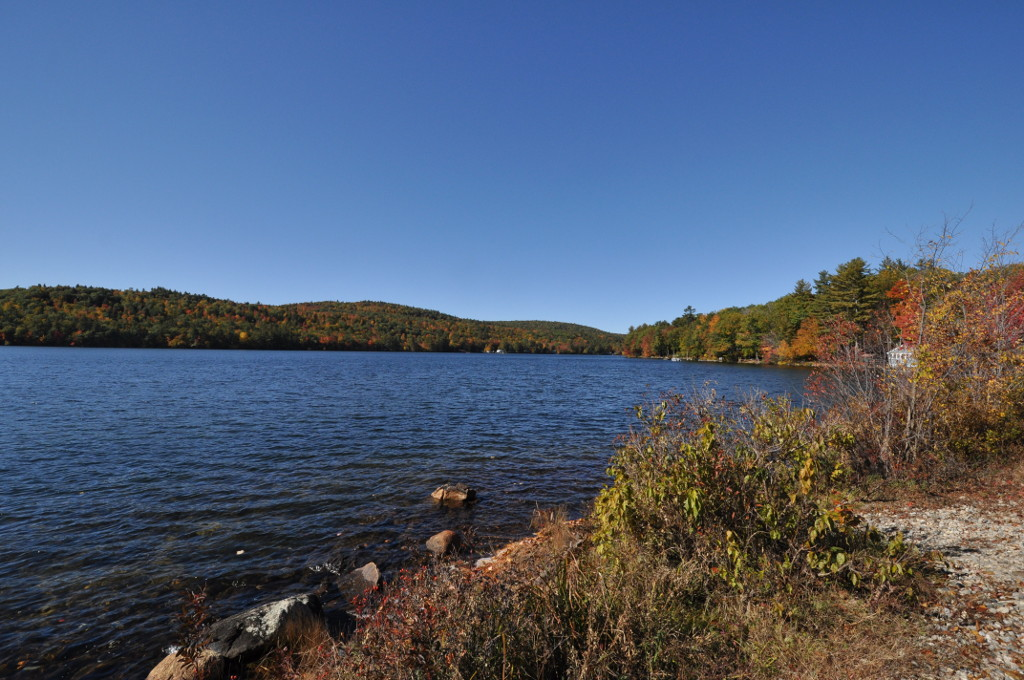
- View looking west from New Bridge Road in Acton, Maine

- Location within Maine Location within New Hampshire Location within the United States
- Location: York County, Maine; Carroll County, New Hampshire
- Coordinates: 43°33′43″N 70°57′30″W
- Type: Oligotrophic
- Primary inflows: Great East Lake; Wilson Lake
- Primary outflows: Salmon Falls River
- Catchment area: 1,139 acres (1.780 mi^{2})
- Basin countries: United States
- Max. length: 1.2 mi (1.9 km)
- Max. width: 0.4 mi (0.64 km)
- Surface area: 227 acres (0.92 km^{2})
- Average depth: 13 ft (4.0 m); Average transparency: 6.6 m (22 ft)
- Max. depth: 30 ft (9.1 m)
- Water volume: 3,155,000 m^{3} (111,417,773.5 ft^{3})
- Residence time: 0.1 years
- Shore length^{1}: 4.8 mi (7.7 km)
- Surface elevation: 551 ft (168 m)
- Settlements: Acton, ME; Wakefield, NH
- References: Midas number: 3924
- ^{1} Shore length is not a well-defined measure.

Horn Pond is a 227-acre (92 ha) water body located on the border of Acton, Maine, and Wakefield, New Hampshire, in the United States. The lake is both spring-fed and fed by the outflows of Great East Lake to the north and Wilson Lake to the east. Horn Pond's outlet is the Salmon Falls River which forms a natural border between Maine and New Hampshire and empties into the Piscataqua River east of Dover, New Hampshire, and ultimately the Gulf of Maine.

Horn Pond is classified as "Potentially Non-supporting" under the New Hampshire Department of Environmental Services' revised water quality standards for oligotrophic lakes. The Horn Pond watershed covers 1,139 acres (461 ha) that is primarily forested (70%). Only 6% of the watershed is developed, with 34% buildable area. The shoreline of Horn Pond is composed primarily of low density houses and camps (51%) and undeveloped shoreline (44%). 70% of the structures along the shoreline are within 50 feet (15 m) of the water's edge.

Horn Pond water quality monitoring has been collected since 1982. During this period, 11 years of secchi disk transparency data, 7 years of total phosphorus (TP) data, 2 years of chlorophyll-a (Chl-a) data, and 5 years of dissolved oxygen (DO) data has been collected. From this data, the median TP concentration is 8.0 parts per billion (ppb) and the mean transparency is 6.6 m (21.7 ft).

The Horn Pond Association has been recently redeveloped and aims to protect and improve the water quality of Horn Pond.

The lake is classified as a warm- and coldwater fishery and contains brook trout, rainbow trout, brown trout, largemouth and smallmouth bass, Eastern chain pickerel, brown bullhead, white perch and bluegill.

== See also ==
- List of lakes in Maine
- List of lakes in New Hampshire
