= Wilson Lake (Maine) =

Lake in York County, Maine, US

- Location within Maine Location within the United States
- Location: Franklin County, Maine
- Coordinates: 43°33′27″N 70°56′19″W
- Type: olgiotrophic
- Primary inflows: spring fed
- Primary outflows: Salmon Falls River
- Catchment area: 2,479 acres (10.0 km^{2})
- Basin countries: United States
- Max. length: 5,274 ft (1,608 m)
- Max. width: 3,741 ft (1,140 m)
- Surface area: 308 acres (125 ha)
- Average depth: 17 ft (5.2 m); Average transparency: 19 ft (5.8 m)
- Max. depth: 44 ft (13 m)
- Water volume: 238,648,300 cu ft (6,757,766 m^{3})
- Residence time: 1.2 years
- Shore length^{1}: 19,419 ft (5,919 m)
- Surface elevation: 571 ft (174 m)
- Settlements: Acton, Maine
- References: Midas number: 3920
- ^{1} Shore length is not a well-defined measure.

Wilson Lake is a 308 acres (0.5 mi^{2}; 1.2 km^{2}) waterbody located in York County, Maine in the United States. The lake is spring-fed and drains to Horn Pond which flows into the Salmon Falls River and eventually empties into the tidal waters of the Piscataqua River in Portsmouth, NH, Great Bay and the Gulf of Maine.

Wilson Lake is classified as "good" under the Maine Department of Environmental Protection water quality parameters. The Wilson Lake watershed covers 2,479 acres (3.9 mi^{2}). The watershed is currently 79% forested, 8% developed, and has 49% buildable area. The Wilson Lake shoreline is primarily composed of low density residential houses and camps (63%). The majority of structures (70%) are within 50 feet of the shoreline.

Wilson Lake water quality has been measured since 1977. During this period 29 years of secchi disk transparency data, 9 years of phosphorus data, 5 years of chlorophyll-a (Chl-a) data, and 17 years of dissolved oxygen (DO) data has been taken. From this data, the median total phosphorus (TP) concentration in 2008 was 6.5 parts per billion (ppb) and mean secchi disk transparency was 5.9 m (19.4 ft).

The Wilson Lake Association was established to maintain a program that will reverse any trend of degrading water quality. The associations also encourages all of the lake's stakeholders to be involved and support cooperative efforts to reduce or eliminate the impact of contaminants on lake water quality.
