= Wakefield Public Library =

- Wakefield public library
- U.S. National Register of Historic Places
- U.S. Historic district – Contributing property
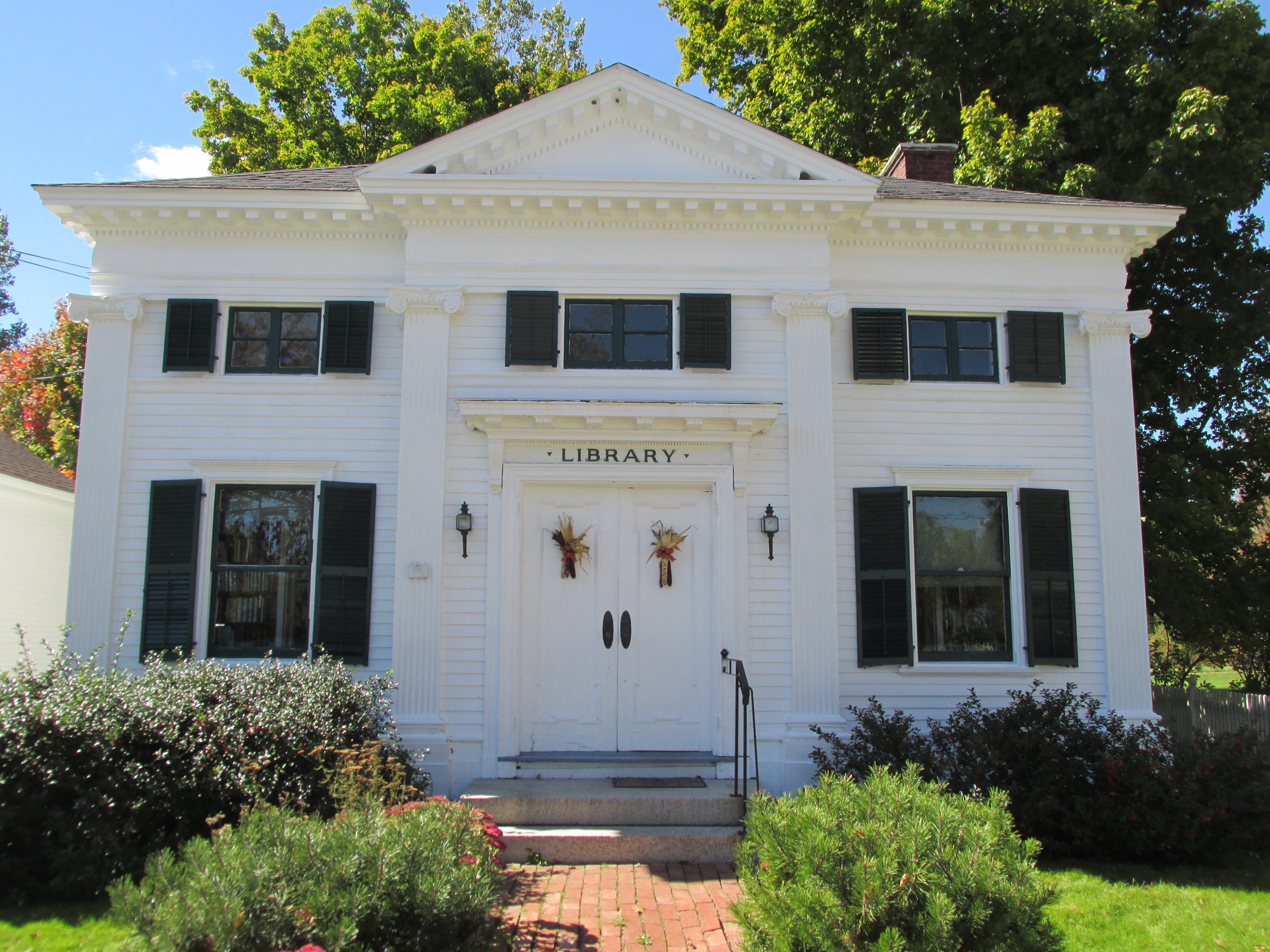

- Location within New Hampshire Location within the United States
- Location: 2699 Wakefield Rd., Wakefield, New Hampshire
- Coordinates: 43°34′9″N 71°1′48″W
- Area: 0.1 acres (0.040 ha)
- Built: 1894
- Architect: Greene, Ernest
- Architectural style: Colonial Revival
- Part of: Wakefield Village Historic District (ID84002521)
- NRHP reference No.: 83001132

Significant dates
- Added to NRHP: September 8, 1983
- Designated CP: March 15, 1984

The Wakefield Public Library serves the town of Wakefield, New Hampshire. It is located at 2699 Wakefield Road in the Wakefield Village, in an architecturally distinguished Colonial Revival building donated to the town by educator and politician Seth Low. The building was listed on the National Register of Historic Places in 1984.

== Architecture and history ==
The Wakefield Public Library is located in the southern portion of Wakefield Village, on the west side of Wakefield Road a short way north of its junction with New Hampshire Route 153. It is a two-story wood-frame structure, with a truncated hip roof, clapboarded exterior, and granite foundation. It has fluted corner pilasters with composite capitals rising to an encircling entablature, and a gabled entry projecting at the enter of the main facade. The gable is fully pedimented and adorned with modillion blocks, which are also found along the main roof cornice. The main entrance is a double-leaf door, flanked by narrow boards and topped by a bracketed entablature with modillions. First-floor windows are regular sash, while those on the second floor are short casement windows.

Seth Low was an educator and politician best known as president of Columbia University and as Mayor of New York City. He was a native of Wakefield, and maintained regular relations with family that remained in the town. He was instrumental in helping found the Wakefield Public Library in 1879, and in securing its operating charter in 1895. In that year he donated a small law office building in the village to house its collection. By 1902, the library had outgrown those quarters, and Low donated the costs associated with construction of this building, which was completed in 1902. It was built in his mother, Ellen Almira Dow Low's honor. She died in childbirth when he was born. It is a small replica of the library he built at Columbia University, in honor of his father. It was designed by Ernest Greene, an architect from New York City with ties to Wakefield, and is one of the town's finest examples of Colonial Revival architecture.

== See also ==
- National Register of Historic Places listings in Carroll County, New Hampshire
