= Sanbornville, New Hampshire =

Census-designated place in New Hampshire, United States

- Census-designated place
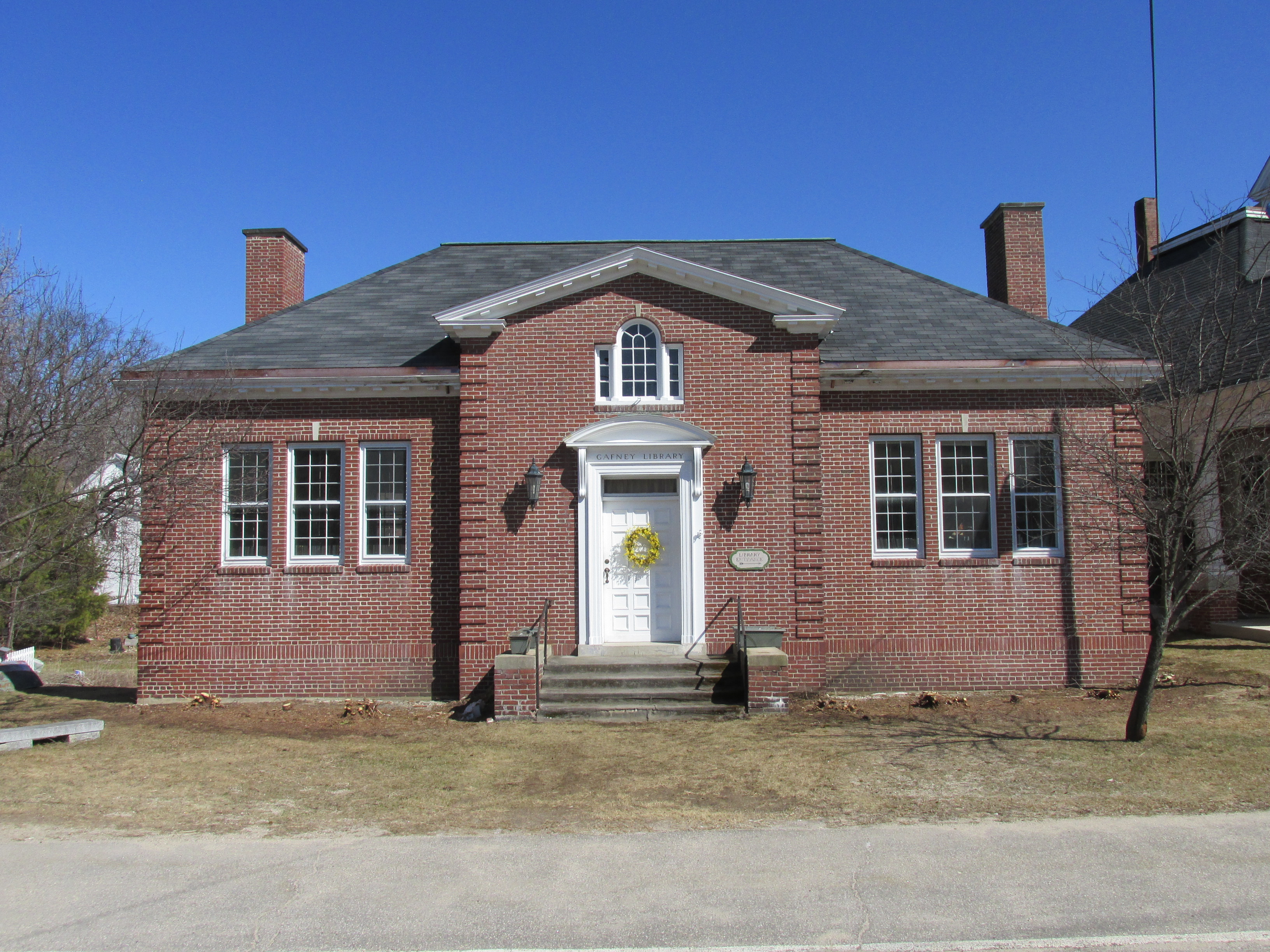
- Gafney Library

- Location within New Hampshire Location within the United States
- Coordinates: 43°33′09″N 71°01′47″W
- Country: United States
- State: New Hampshire
- County: Carroll
- Town: Wakefield

Area
  - Total: 1.61 sq mi (4.18 km^{2})
  - Land: 1.61 sq mi (4.18 km^{2})
  - Water: 0 sq mi (0.00 km^{2})
- Elevation: 574 ft (175 m)

Population (2020)
  - Total: 963
  - Density: 597/sq mi (230.4/km^{2})
- Time zone: UTC-5 (Eastern (EST))
  - Summer (DST): UTC-4 (EDT)
- ZIP code: 03872
- Area code: 603
- FIPS code: 33-67460
- GNIS feature ID: 2629738

Sanbornville is a census-designated place (CDP) and the primary village in the town of Wakefield, New Hampshire, United States. It had a population of 963 at the 2020 census.

== Geography ==
Sanbornville is in the southwestern part of the town of Wakefield, south of Wakefield village and north of Union. New Hampshire Route 16 forms the western edge of the CDP; the highway runs north 10 miles (16 km) to Ossipee and south 20 miles (32 km) to Rochester. New Hampshire Route 153 runs through the center of Sanbornville, leading north 17 miles (27 km) to Effingham and south 12 miles (19 km) to Farmington. New Hampshire Route 109 also passes through the center of Sanbornville, leading west 13 miles (21 km) to Wolfeboro and southeast 18 miles (29 km) to Sanford, Maine.

According to the U.S. Census Bureau, the Sanbornville CDP has a total area of 1.6 square miles (4.2 km^{2}), all of it recorded as land. The village is at the outlet of Lovell Lake, which forms the eastern edge of the CDP. The Branch River flows westward from the lake through the village before turning south on its course towards the Salmon Falls River.

== Demographics ==
Historical population
Census	Pop.	Note	%±
2010	1,056		—
2020	963		−8.8%
U.S. Decennial Census

As of the census of 2010, there were 1,056 people, 417 households, and 280 families residing in the CDP. There were 482 housing units, of which 65, or 13.5%, were vacant. 35 of the vacant units were for seasonal or recreational use. The racial makeup of the CDP was 97.9% white, 0.6% African American, 0.6% Asian, and 0.9% two or more races. 0.7% of the population were Hispanic or Latino of any race.

Of the 417 households in the CDP, 32.9% had children under the age of 18 living with them, 49.4% were headed by married couples living together, 11.5% had a female householder with no husband present, and 32.9% were non-families. 26.6% of all households were made up of individuals, and 12.3% were someone living alone who was 65 years of age or older. The average household size was 2.53, and the average family size was 3.03.

23.9% of residents in the CDP were under the age of 18, 8.4% were from age 18 to 24, 24.5% were from 25 to 44, 31.1% were from 45 to 64, and 12.3% were 65 years of age or older. The median age was 40.9 years. For every 100 females, there were 94.1 males. For every 100 females age 18 and over, there were 88.3 males.

For the period 2011–15, the estimated median annual income for a household was $45,352, and the median income for a family was $55,655. The per capita income for the CDP was $25,007.
