= Lovell Lake =

Lake in Carroll County, New Hampshire, US

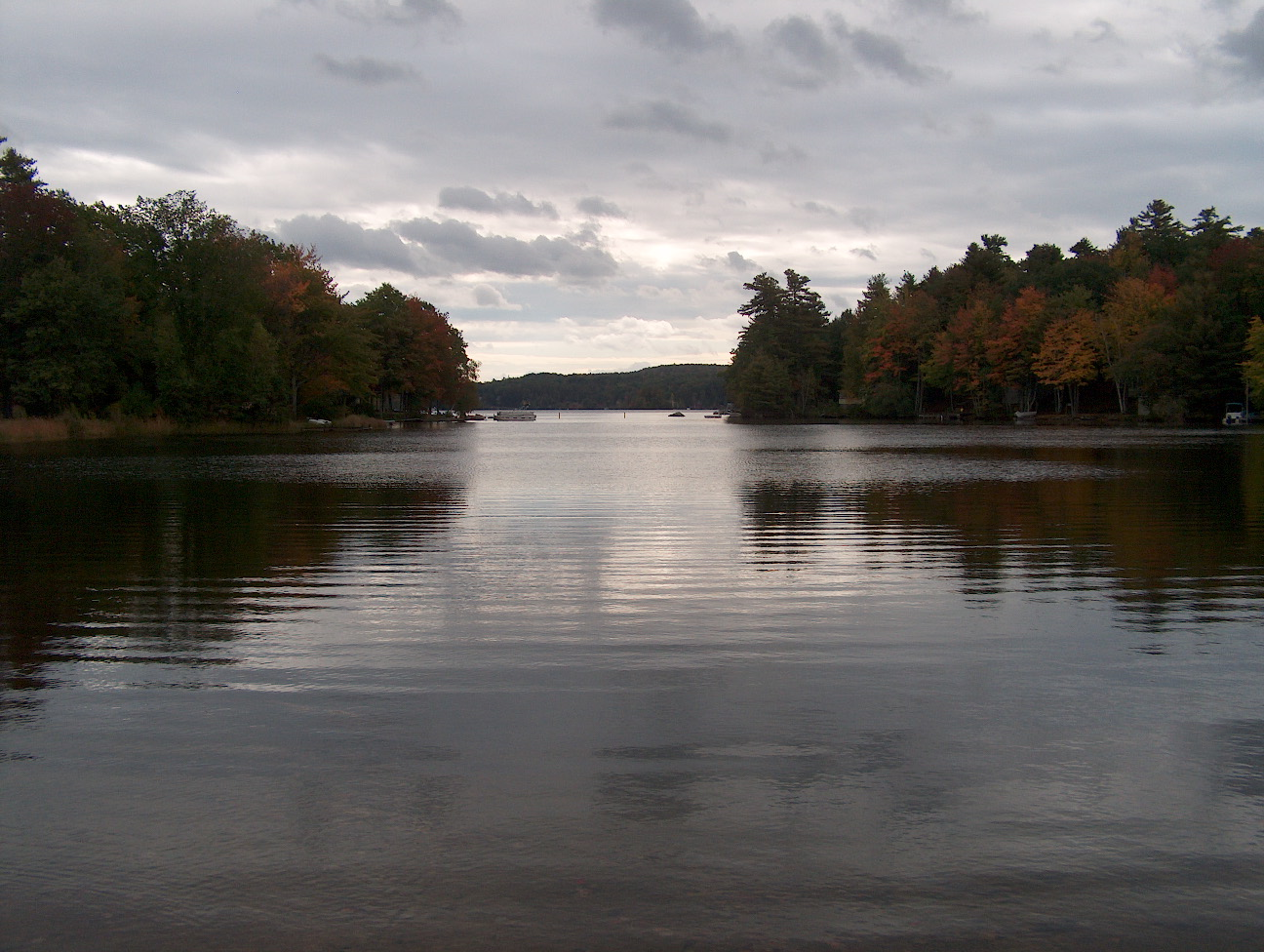
- Near the outlet in Sanbornville, New Hampshire

- Location within New Hampshire Location within the United States
- Location: Wakefield, Carroll County, New Hampshire
- Coordinates: 43°32′27″N 71°0′15″W
- Type: oligotrophic
- Primary inflows: Horse Brook
- Primary outflows: Branch River
- Catchment area: 3,076 acres (12.4 km^{2})
- Basin countries: United States
- Max. length: 2.5 mi (4.0 km)
- Max. width: 0.7 mi (1.1 km)
- Surface area: 538 acres (2.18 km^{2})
- Average depth: 18 ft (5.5 m)
- Max. depth: 40 ft (12.2 m)
- Water volume: 8,623,000 m^{3} (304,518,371.1 cu ft)
- Residence time: 1.4 years
- Shore length^{1}: 6.6 mi (10.6 km)
- Surface elevation: 571 ft (174 m)
- Islands: 3
- Settlements: Sanbornville (town of Wakefield)
- ^{1} Shore length is not a well-defined measure.

Lovell Lake is a 538-acre (2.18 km^{2}) water body in Carroll County in eastern New Hampshire, United States, in the town of Wakefield. The lake is both spring-fed and fed by small streams including Horse Brook. The outlet of the lake, located at the village of Sanbornville, is the beginning of the Branch River. From here, the Branch River flows through Milton where it joins the Salmon Falls River on the Maine-New Hampshire border. The Salmon Falls River empties into the tidal waters of the Piscataqua River northwest of Portsmouth, New Hampshire, then into the Gulf of Maine.

Lovell Lake is defined as a "Tier 1" water body and is designated as "fully supporting" according to the New Hampshire Department of Environmental Services. The Lovell Lake watershed covers 3,076 acres (1,244.8 ha). Its watershed is currently 64% forested, 14% developed, and contains 37% buildable area. The Lovell Lake shoreline is composed of primarily low density residential houses and camps (87%). The majority of these structures (68%) are within 50 feet (15 m) of the shoreline. Although the lake is designated as a high quality water lake, shoreline development and proximity of structures have led to increased polluted runoff that threatens the lake's water quality.

Lovell Lake water quality has been measured since 1979 at station 1 and 1989 at station 2. This includes 19 years of secchi disk data (transparency), 19 years of phosphorus data, 16 years of chlorophyll-a (Chl-a) data, and 3 years of dissolved oxygen (DO) data. From this data, the median total phosphorus (TP) concentration in 2008 was 7.5 parts per billion (ppb) and mean secchi disk transparency was 6.3 m (20.7 ft).

Several organizations are currently in place that aim to protect and improve the water quality of Lovell Lake. The Lovell Lake Association is dedicated to preserving the lake. Lovell Lake also has a courtesy boat inspection program run by the NH Lake Host Program that inspects over 500 boats annually. There is also a weed watchers program that searches the shores for invasive aquatic plants.

The lake is classified as a warmwater fishery and contains rainbow trout, smallmouth and largemouth bass, chain pickerel, horned pout, white perch, and walleye.

== See also ==
- List of lakes in New Hampshire
