= District No. 2 Schoolhouse =

- U.S. National Register of Historic Places
- U.S. Historic district – Contributing property
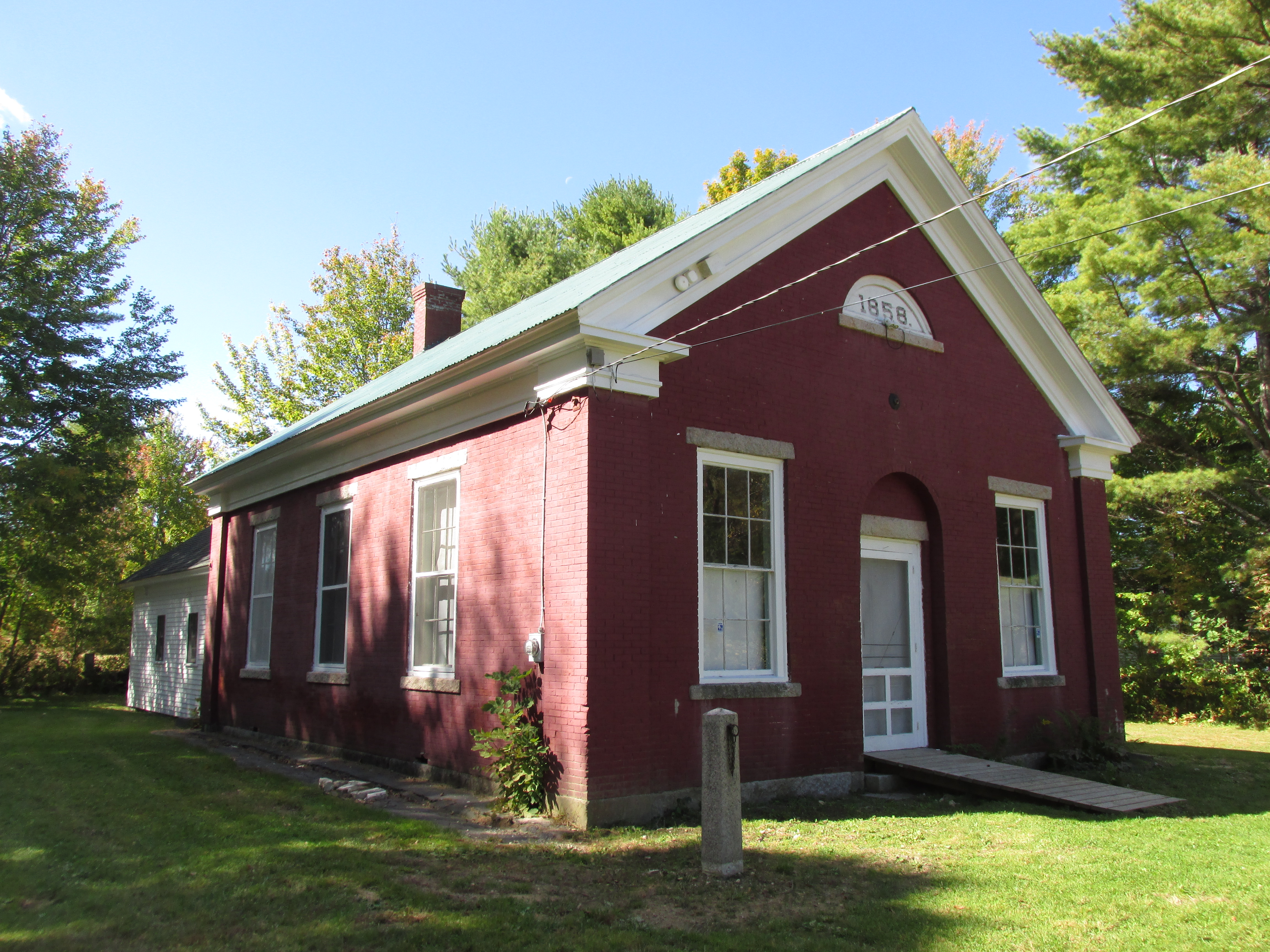

- Location within New Hampshire Location within the United States
- Location: 2851 Wakefield Rd., Wakefield, New Hampshire
- Coordinates: 43°34′23″N 71°1′58″W
- Area: 0.5 acres (0.20 ha)
- Built: 1858
- Architectural style: Greek Revival, Federal
- Part of: Wakefield Village Historic District (ID84002521)
- NRHP reference No.: 80000270

Significant dates
- Added to NRHP: October 3, 1980
- Designated CP: March 15, 1984

The District No. 2 Schoolhouse, also known as the Little Red Schoolhouse, is a historic one-room schoolhouse at 2851 Wakefield Road in Wakefield, New Hampshire. Built in 1858–59, it was at the time one of the finest district schoolhouses in rural New Hampshire. It was used as a school until 1941, and now houses the museum of the local historical society. The building was listed on the National Register of Historic Places in 1980.

== Description and history ==
The former District No. 2 Schoolhouse stands near the northern end of the elongated village of Wakefield, on the southwest side of Wakefield Road a short way south of its junction with East Side Road. It is a 1 1/2-story brick structure, with a gabled roof and granite foundation. Its corners have brick pilasters, which rise to entablatures running along the sides. The main entrance is set in a round-arch opening, and there is a half-round opening in the gable end, filled with a wooden panel marked with the year of construction, 1858. A single-story wood-frame ell extends to the rear. The property includes a privy and a fully outfitted 19th-century cobbler's shop.

The school was built in 1858, after the previous school was destroyed by fire. Apparently as a consequence of that fire, the town decided to rebuild in brick, creating what was then noted as one of the finest district schools in the region. It was used as a public school building until 1941. In 1950 the town leased the building to the Wakefield-Brookfield Historical Society, which purchased it outright in 1956. It now serves as a museum and meeting space for the society.

== See also ==
- National Register of Historic Places listings in Carroll County, New Hampshire
