= Wakefield Village Historic District =

Historic district in New Hampshire, United States

- U.S. National Register of Historic Places
- U.S. Historic district
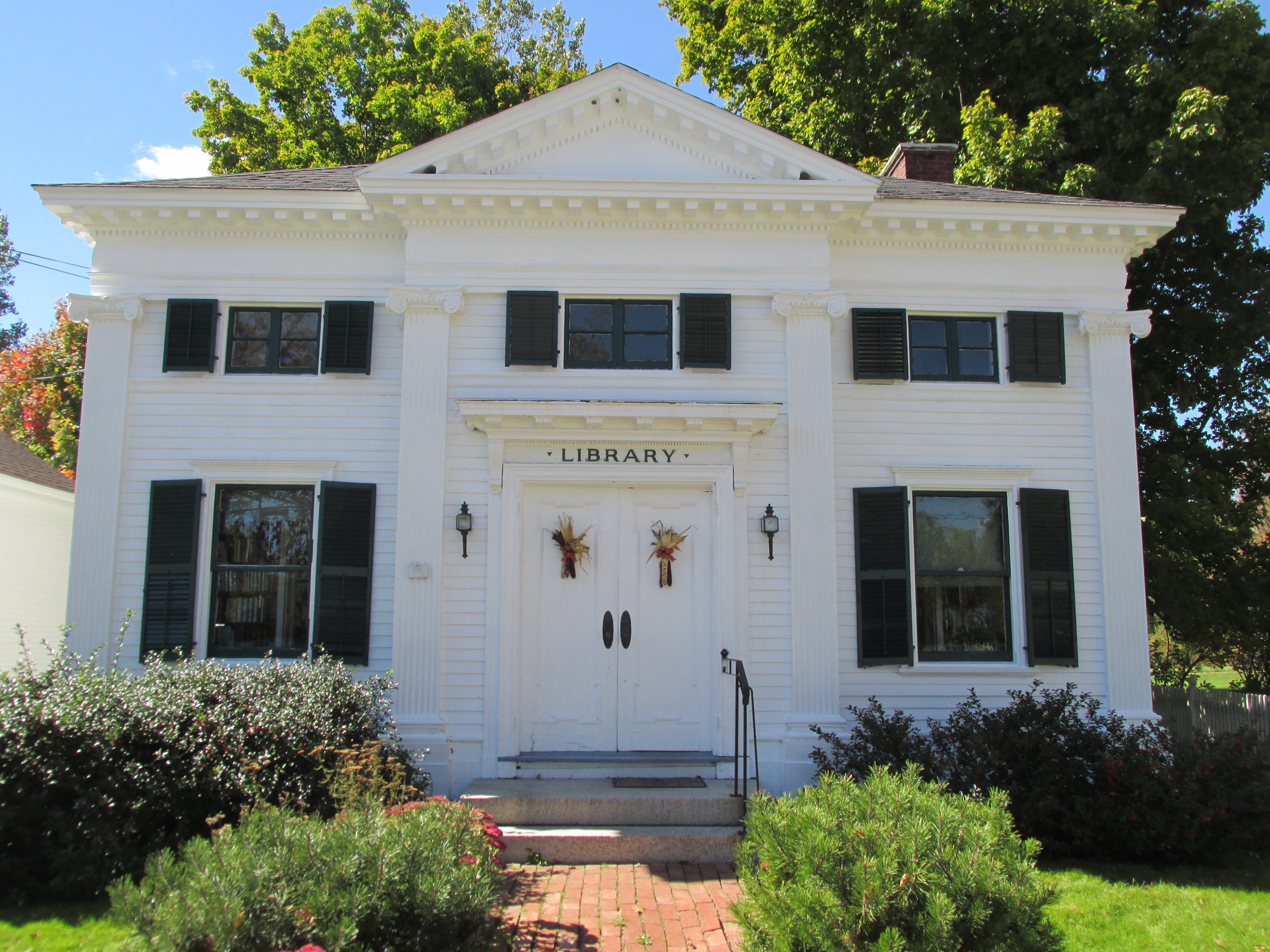
- Wakefield Public Library

- Location within New Hampshire Location within the United States
- Location: Off NH 153, Wakefield, New Hampshire
- Coordinates: 43°34′7″N 71°1′46″W
- Area: 79.5 acres (32.2 ha)
- Architectural style: Greek Revival, Federal
- NRHP reference No.: 84002521
- Added to NRHP: March 15, 1984

The Wakefield Village Historic District encompasses the historic village center of Wakefield, New Hampshire. It is centered at the junction of New Hampshire Route 153 and Mountain Laurel Road, which was historically the major north–south route in Carroll County. The district consists mainly of residential properties dating from the 18th to early 20th centuries, and also includes the 1836 town hall (supplanted in 1895 by the current town hall in Sanbornville), public library¸ Grange Hall, and a one-room schoolhouse that now houses the local historical society. The district was listed on the National Register of Historic Places in 1984.

The junction around which the village grew was created in 1778, when the road branching northeast was laid out in the direction of Parsonsfield, Maine. Most of the houses in the district date roughly from this time to the 1820s, and are either vernacular or Federal in style. The notable exceptions are "Westlook", a Colonial Revival house built in 1929, and the Jackson Horne House, built in 1875 and remodeled in 1865. The oldest house in the district is believed to be "The Anchorage", a vernacular Cape style house that appears to date to the 1770s.

The Old Town Hall was built in 1836, and hosted the town's meetings until 1895, when the new town hall was built. It has since been leased to the Congregational Church, which uses it for social service functions. The Lovell Grange Hall was built in 1918 for a chapter organized in 1892. It is a rectangular wood frame clapboarded structure mounted on concrete piers. The old portion of Wakefield Library building began as a lawyer's office in the 1860s, and was acquired by the town in 1895 as a gift from Seth Low. The newer portion, also donated by Low, was built in 1902–03. The Colonial Revival Congregational Church was built in 1958, replacing an 1831 church that burned in 1956; it is not historically significant.

== See also ==
- National Register of Historic Places listings in Carroll County, New Hampshire
