= East Wakefield, New Hampshire =

Unincorporated community in New Hampshire, United States

- Unincorporated community
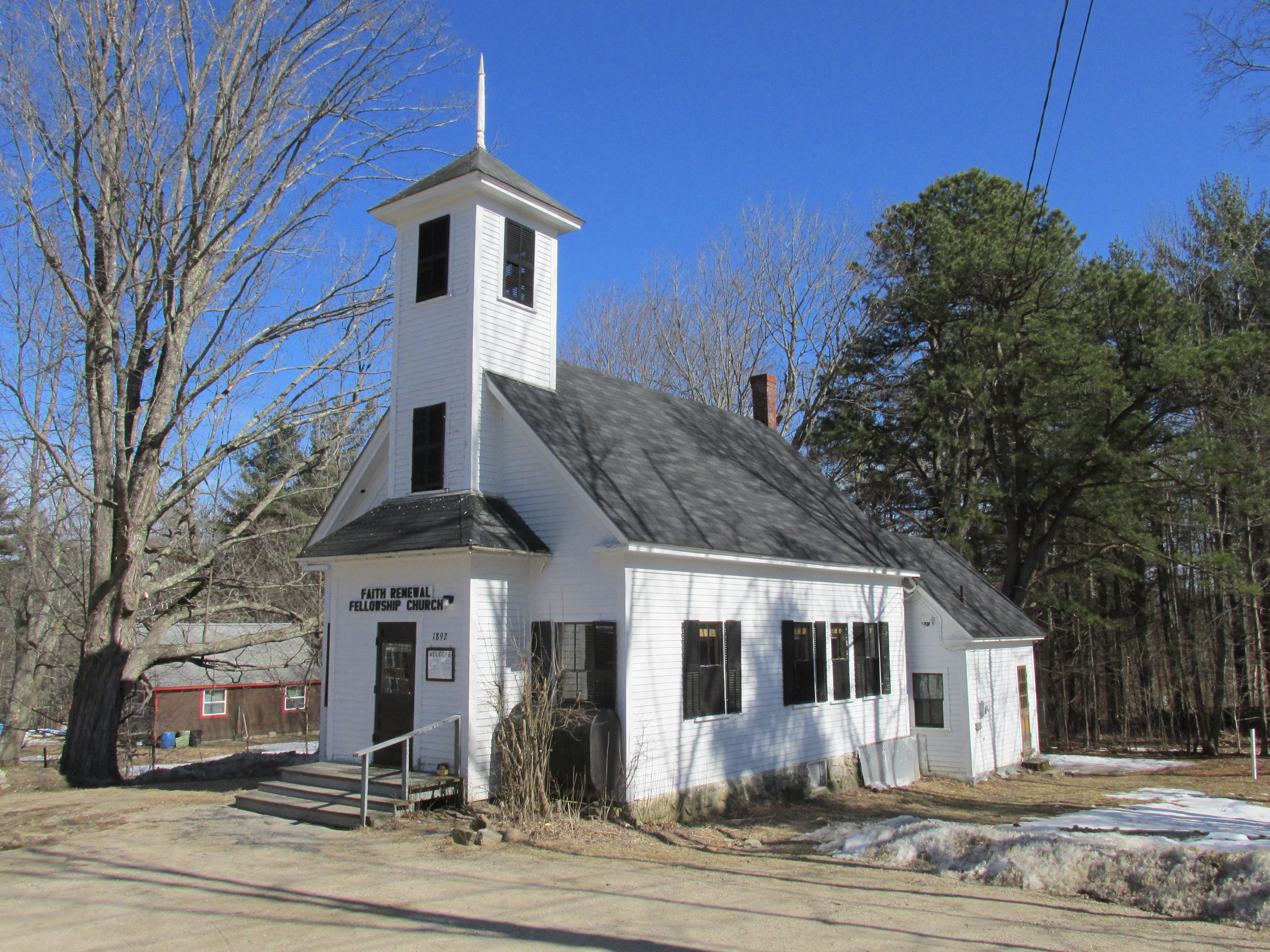
- The former Faith Renewal Fellowship Church

- Location within New Hampshire Location within the United States
- Coordinates: 43°36′51″N 71°00′20″W
- Country: United States
- State: New Hampshire
- County: Carroll
- Town: Wakefield
- Elevation: 686 ft (209 m)
- Time zone: UTC-5 (Eastern (EST))
  - Summer (DST): UTC-4 (EDT)
- ZIP code: 03830
- Area code: 603
- GNIS feature ID: 866732

East Wakefield is an unincorporated community in the town of Wakefield in Carroll County, New Hampshire. It is located in the eastern part of Wakefield along New Hampshire Route 153, 3 miles (5 km) northeast of Wakefield village and directly south of Pine River Pond. Balch Pond and Ivanhoe Pond are also nearby. The area is a popular summer home location.

East Wakefield has a different ZIP code (03830) from the rest of the town of Wakefield.
