= George A. Wentworth =

American teacher and textbook author (1835–1906)

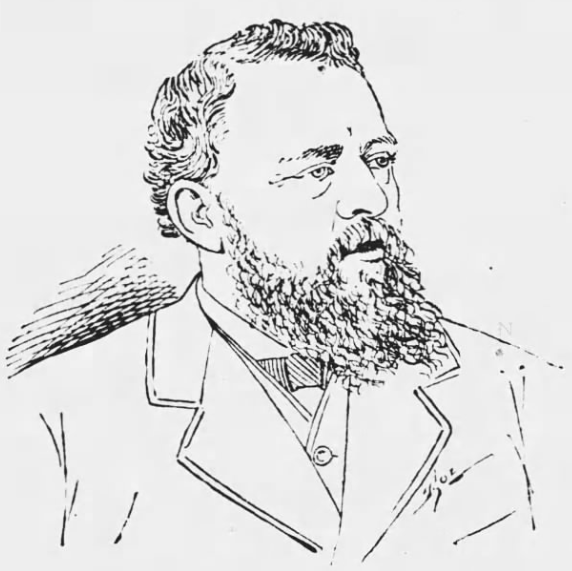
- A drawing of Wentworth published in 1886
- Born: July 31, 1835; Wakefield, New Hampshire, U.S.
- Died: May 24, 1906 (aged 70); Dover, New Hampshire, U.S.
- Education: Phillips Exeter Academy
- Alma mater: Harvard College
- Occupation(s): Teacher, textbook writer
- Known for: Textbooks on mathematics
- Spouse: Emily Hatch (m. 1864; died 1895)
- Children: 3

George Albert Wentworth (July 31, 1835 – May 24, 1906) was an American teacher and author of textbooks on mathematics including algebra, geometry, and trigonometry.

== Biography ==
Wentworth was born in 1835 in Wakefield, New Hampshire, the youngest of eight children. He enrolled at Phillips Exeter Academy (PEA) in Exeter, New Hampshire, in 1852 and went on to graduate from Harvard College in 1858. While an undergraduate at Harvard he began teaching at PEA, and was appointed professor of mathematics there on March 23, 1858. One of his early students was Robert Todd Lincoln, who enrolled at PEA in the fall of 1859, and was visited in Exeter by his father, Abraham Lincoln, the following spring. When the future president spoke in Exeter on March 3, 1860, Wentworth was toastmaster at the event.

Wentworth wrote a series of textbooks on mathematics, of which The Boston Globe noted in 1886, "his Complete Algebra and Elements of Geometry are used extensively by many of the more important schools in America, and doubtless will, with but very few changes, be employed as standard works for a half century to come."

Wentworth remained at PEA for over 30 years, including serving as interim principal in 1889. He resigned his position as a professor in 1892, after which he continued to write textbooks. He was named a PEA trustee in 1899. Wentworth was also involved in banking, serving as a director of the National Granite State Bank; later, he became president of the Exeter Banking Company upon its formation in 1894. In 1903, Wentworth and George S. Morison donated the funding for construction of a new dormitory at PEA, Hoyt Hall, named after a former mathematics instructor. Wentworth was considered "a leading citizen in many activities."

In 1900, while Wentworth was visiting New Orleans, The Times-Picayune wrote, "There are not many young people of this generation, who have reached the age of discretion, who have not seen a Wentworth's arithmetic, an algebra, geometry, trigonometry, or an analytical trigonometry." A 1904 update to his textbook Plane and Solid Geometry was lauded for its discussion of limits, "believed to be the best presentation of the subject in any elementary geometry."

Wentworth died in 1906 in Dover, New Hampshire. His wife, Emily née Hatch from Covington, Kentucky, had died in 1895. He was survived by two sons and a daughter. His estate was estimated to have a value over $1 million ($35 million in 2024). One of his sons continued to update the textbooks and issued new ones. In 1920, Wentworth's textbooks were still in active use and were considered "one of the notable successes of the textbook history."

In 1925, PEA named Wentworth Hall, one of three new dormitories, in his honor. The school maintains a "George Albert Wentworth Professor in Mathematics" position, which is held by Gwynneth Coogan as of January 2024. Since 1962, Wentworth has been honored on a New Hampshire historical marker in his hometown of Wakefield.

== Works ==
Wentworth's textbooks include:

- First Steps in Number
- Mental Arithmetic
- Primary Arithmetic
- Elementary Arithmetic
- Grammar School Arithmetic
- High School Arithmetic
- Exercises in Arithmetic
- First Steps in Algebra
- School Algebra
- Elements of Algebra
- Complete Algebra
- College Algebra
- Higher Algebra
- Exercises in Algebra
- New Plane Geometry
- New Plane and Solid Geometry
- New Solid Geometry
- Exercises in Geometry
- Analytic Geometry
- Logarithmic and Trigonometric Tables

Wentworth co-wrote some textbooks with George Anthony Hill (1842–1916), an assistant professor of physics at Harvard.
