= George Anthony Hill =

American teacher and textbook author (1842–1916)

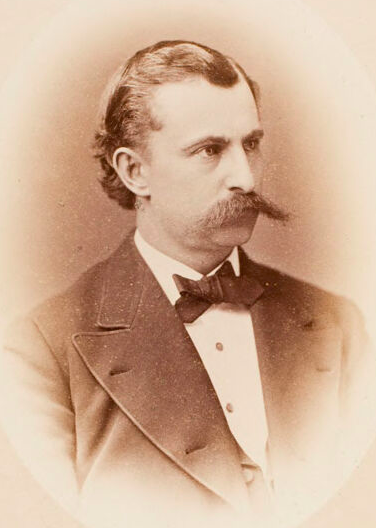
- Photograph of Hill by William Notman, c. 1868–1870
- Born: August 25, 1842; Sherborn, Massachusetts, U.S.
- Died: August 17, 1916 (aged 73); Cambridge, Massachusetts, U.S.
- Resting place: Sherborn, Massachusetts, U.S.
- Education: Harvard University
- Occupations: College professor, private tutor, textbook writer
- Known for: Textbooks on physics and mathematics

George Anthony Hill (August 25, 1842 – August 17, 1916) was an American professor at Harvard and author of textbooks, primarily about physics and mathematics.

== Biography ==
Hill was born in 1842 in Sherborn, Massachusetts. He received a bachelor's degree from Harvard in 1865, and a master's degree there in 1870. His education included time spent at the University of Glasgow studying under Lord Kelvin.

Hill was appointed an assistant professor of physics at Harvard, effective September 1, 1871, a role he held until 1876. He then spent two years studying in Germany. Upon his return, he focused on writing textbooks while also acting as a private tutor at Harvard. In 1898, he became director of a tutoring school in Cambridge, Massachusetts, where he worked for 16 years until his retirement in 1914.

Hill wrote various textbooks, primarily on physics and mathematics. At the time of his death, The Boston Post noted that some of Hill's textbooks were "standard works, particularly his first book, Geometry for Beginners, written in 1880." Hill co-wrote some textbooks with George A. Wentworth (1835–1906), a teacher of mathematics at Phillips Exeter Academy.

Hill died in August 1916 in a hospital in Cambridge. His estate was valued at $28,000 ($828,440 in 2025). Hill was buried in his hometown of Sherborn.

== Works ==
Hill's textbooks include:

- Geometry for Beginners
- Lessons in Geometry
- Exercise Manuals in Arithmetic, Algebra and Geometry
- Examination Manuals in Arithmetic, Algebra and Geometry
- Essentials of Physics
- Text Book of Physics (with G. A. Wentworth)
- First Steps in Geometry (with G. A. Wentworth)
