= Acton School Department =

School district in York County, Maine, United States

- 700 Milton Mills Road Acton, Maine, 4001

District information
- Type: Public
- Grades: PreK–12
- NCES District ID: 2302220

Students and staff
- Students: 217
- Teachers: 21.0
- Staff: 31.2
- Student–teacher ratio: 10.33

Other information
- Website: www.actonschool.org

Acton School Department is the school district serving Acton, Maine.

== Schools ==
Acton School is an elementary school which educates students in kindergarten through eighth grade, and is the only public school in Acton. It enrolls approximately 300 students each year.

The school has a teacher/student ratio of 1:10, below the state average of 1:14. 98% of the students enrolled in the school are white. The school principal is Tricia Boivin, who replaced Kyle Rhoads, who had previously replaced Carol A. Eddy. The school's mascot is the wildcat and their school colors are blue and white.

Students in ninth grade through twelfth grade attend Sanford High School in nearby Sanford, Maine.
