= Balch Pond =

- Stump Pond
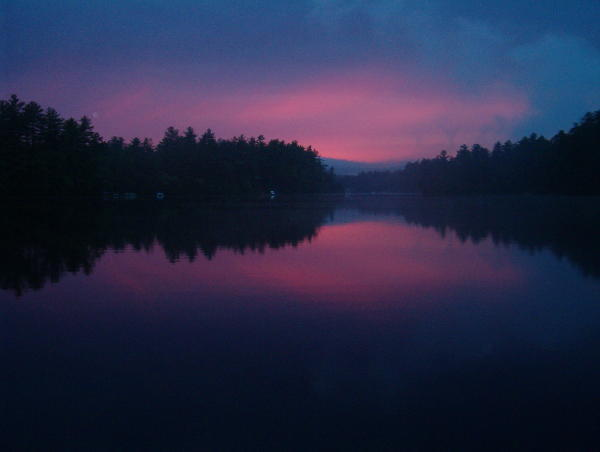

- Location within Maine Location within New Hampshire Location within the United States
- Location: Carroll County, New Hampshire; York County, Maine
- Coordinates: 43°36′58″N 70°58′39″W
- Type: Lake
- Primary outflows: Little Ossipee River
- Catchment area: 14.3 square miles (37 km^{2})
- Basin countries: United States
- Max. length: 3.7 mi (6.0 km)
- Max. width: 1.7 mi (2.7 km)
- Surface area: 577 acres (2.34 km^{2})
- Average depth: 10 ft (3.0 m)
- Max. depth: 46 ft (14 m)
- Water volume: 6,578 acre⋅ft (8,114,000 m^{3})
- Residence time: 136 days
- Shore length^{1}: 10.1 miles (16.3 km)
- Surface elevation: 558 ft (170 m)
- Settlements: Wakefield, New Hampshire; Acton and Newfield, Maine
- ^{1} Shore length is not a well-defined measure.

Balch Pond is a 577-acre (2.34 km^{2}) water body located on the New Hampshire-Maine border, in the towns of Wakefield, New Hampshire, and Acton and Newfield, Maine. A northwest portion of the lake in New Hampshire is known as Stump Pond. Water flows from the eastern end of Balch Pond into the Little Ossipee River, a tributary of the Saco River.

The lake is classified as a warmwater fishery, with observed species including largemouth bass, chain pickerel, brown bullhead, black crappie, yellow perch, and sunfish.

== See also ==
- List of lakes in Maine
- List of lakes in New Hampshire
