= Great East Lake =

Lake of the United States

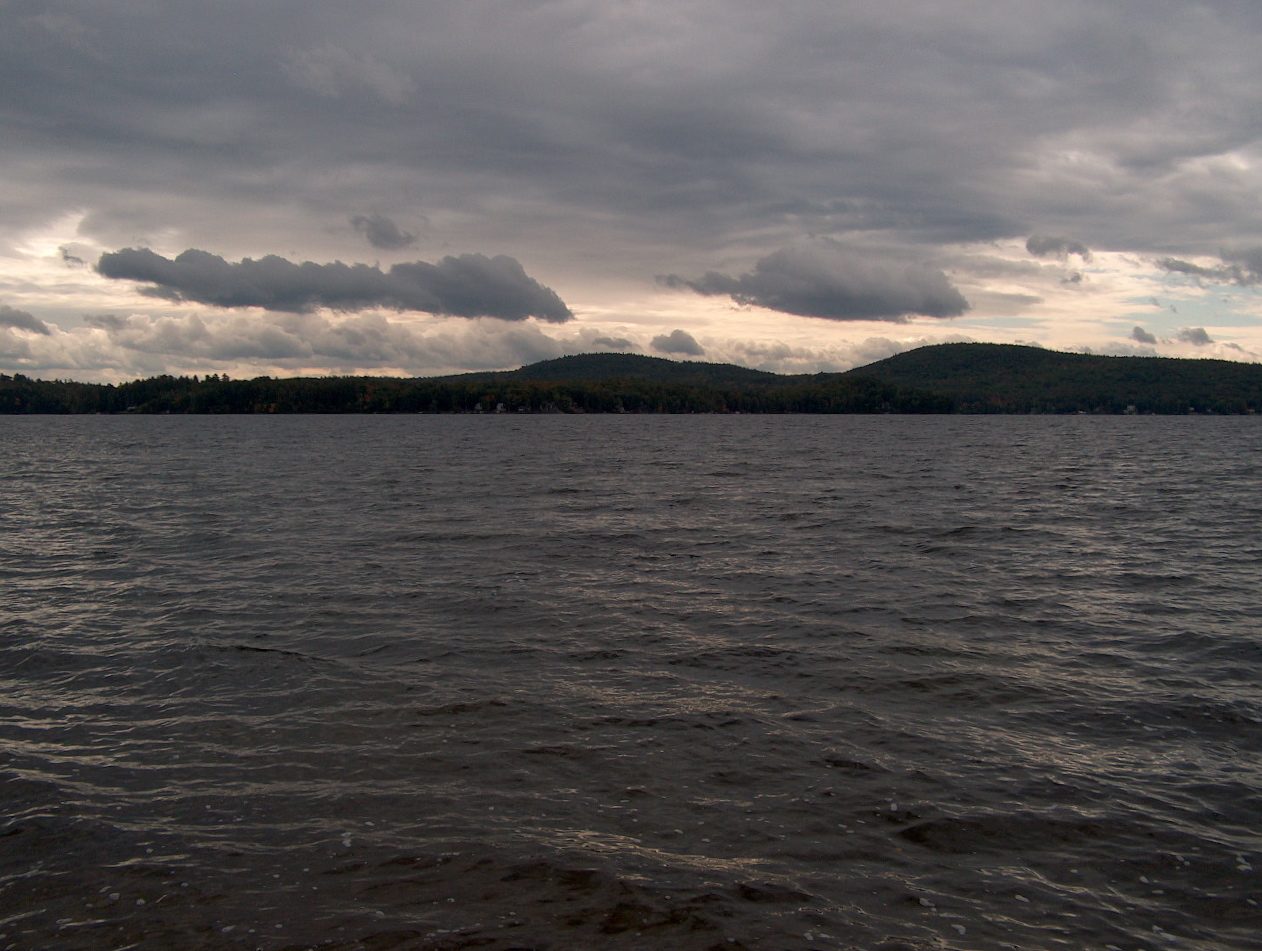

- Location within Maine Location within New Hampshire Location within the United States
- Location: Carroll County, New Hampshire; York County, Maine
- Coordinates: 43°35′2″N 70°58′39″W
- Type: oligotrophic
- Primary inflows: Copp Brook; Scribner Brook
- Primary outflows: Salmon Falls River
- Catchment area: 15.5 square miles (40 km^{2})
- Basin countries: United States
- Max. length: 5.5 mi (8.9 km)
- Max. width: 1.1 mi (1.8 km)
- Surface area: 1,825 acres (7.4 km^{2})
- Average depth: 35 ft (11 m); Average transparency: 30 ft (9.2 m)
- Max. depth: 102 ft (31 m)
- Water volume: 59,993 acre⋅ft (74,000,000 m^{3})
- Residence time: 3.3 years
- Shore length^{1}: 18.02 mi (29.00 km)
- Surface elevation: 571 ft (174 m)
- Settlements: Wakefield, New Hampshire; Acton, Maine
- ^{1} Shore length is not a well-defined measure.

Great East Lake is an 1,825-acre (7.4 km^{2}) water body located in Carroll County, New Hampshire, and York County, Maine, in the United States. The lake is shared by the towns of Wakefield, New Hampshire, and Acton, Maine, with 45% of its surface area in Acton and 55% in Wakefield. The lake is the farthest upstream of the five headwater lakes of the Salmon Falls River, a tributary of the Piscataqua River. Water from Great East Lake flows out its dam and through the 800-foot (240 m) Newichawannock Canal into Horn Pond, then into the Salmon Falls River below Horn Pond.

The widest part of the lake is in New Hampshire. The lake narrows to the east in Maine, creating the First, Second and Third basins. Great East Lake is the largest of the Salmon Falls headwater lakes.

Great East Lake supports abundant wildlife, and 21 fish species including lake trout (togue), rainbow trout, smallmouth bass, largemouth bass, American eel, hornpout, white perch, black crappie and chain pickerel.

Water quality monitoring data has been collected since 1974, including 29 years of secchi disk transparencies, 23 years of total phosphorus (TP) data, 20 years of chlorophyll-a (Chl-a) data and 7 years of dissolved oxygen (DO) profiles. Sampling results from Station 1 (1974-2008) show a median TP concentration of 6.4 parts per billion (ppb), a mean secchi disk transparency of 9.2 m (30.2 ft), and a mean Chl-a concentration of 1.2 ppb. The data indicates that Great East Lake is a high quality water by both the Maine Department of Environmental Protection and New Hampshire Department of Environmental Services standards.

The Great East Lake watershed is located in Acton, Maine, and Wakefield, New Hampshire, and covers approximately 9,939 acres (40.2 km^{2}). Great East Lake is part of the Piscataqua River major drainage basin and the Salmon Falls River subdrainage basin. Great East Lake flows into Horn Pond which in turn starts the Salmon Falls River at its outflow. The Salmon Falls River then flows into the Piscataqua River and into the Great Bay estuary and the Gulf of Maine.

The Great East Lake watershed is currently 66% forested, 9% developed, and 52% buildable area. The shoreline of Great East Lake is composed of primarily medium density residential houses and camps (77%). The majority of these structures (64%) are within 50 feet (15 m) of the shoreline.

The Great East Lake Improvement Association (GELIA) was founded in 1932 and has been dedicated to the welfare of Great East Lake, its wildlife, and environment. The nonprofit organization sees education as its primary function to help protect the lake.

Great East Lake has several other programs and organizations dedicated to protecting its pristine water quality. A boat inspection program is run by the NH Lake Host Program where over 1,000 boats are inspected annually for invasive aquatic plants. There is also a weed watchers program (similar to the Invasive Plants Patrollers Program in Maine).

== See also ==
- List of lakes in Maine
- List of lakes in New Hampshire
