= Brookfield, New Hampshire =

- Town
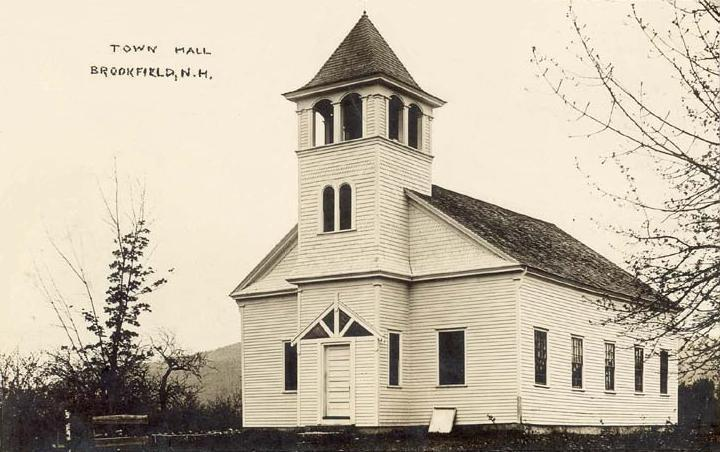
- Brookfield Town Hall in 1915

- Seal

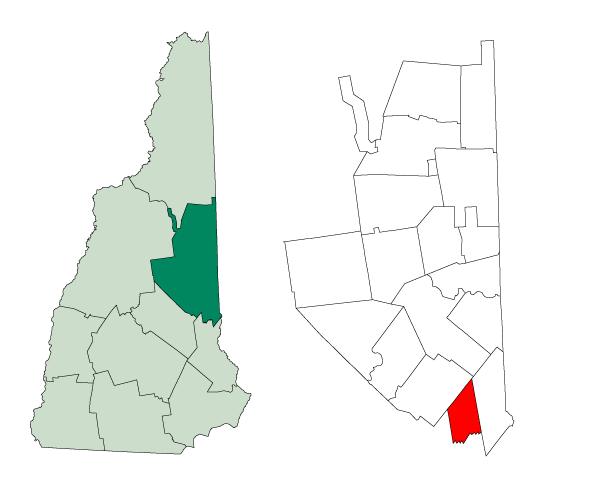
- Location in Carroll County, New Hampshire
- Coordinates: 43°33′43″N 71°04′59″W
- Country: United States
- State: New Hampshire
- County: Carroll
- Incorporated: December 12, 1794

Area
  - Total: 23.2 sq mi (60.2 km^{2})
  - Land: 22.8 sq mi (59.1 km^{2})
  - Water: 0.42 sq mi (1.1 km^{2}) 1.82%
- Elevation: 650 ft (200 m)

Population (2020)
  - Total: 755
  - Density: 33/sq mi (12.8/km^{2})
- Time zone: UTC-5 (Eastern)
  - Summer (DST): UTC-4 (Eastern)
- ZIP code: 03872
- Area code: 603
- FIPS code: 33-07940
- GNIS feature ID: 873553
- Website: www.brookfieldnh.gov

Brookfield is a town in Carroll County, New Hampshire, United States. The population was 755 at the 2020 census, and an estimated 825 in 2025.

== History ==
Settled in 1726 by Scots-Irish immigrants, the town was first named "Coleraine" after the Protestant-majority town of that name in County Londonderry in what has since become Northern Ireland. Fertile ground made it popular with farmers. It was later renamed "Brookfield", after Brookfield, Massachusetts, and made a part of the town of Middleton. However, in 1785, Brookfield petitioned, unsuccessfully, to be set off from Middleton. This was due to the division of the original town of Middleton into two parts by the long, high ridge of the Moose Mountains, then a considerable obstacle to travel. Town meetings, traditionally held in the muddy season of March, were particularly difficult to attend for those beyond the ridge. In 1794, however, permission was granted, and Brookfield was incorporated. In 1840, when Carroll County was set off from Strafford County, Brookfield went with Carroll, and Middleton remained with Strafford.

In 1874, the Wolfeborough Branch Railroad passed through this town.

== Geography ==
According to the United States Census Bureau, the town has a total area of 23.2 square miles (60.2 km^{2}), of which 22.8 sq mi (59.1 km^{2}) are land and 0.42 sq mi (1.1 km^{2}) are water, comprising 1.82% of the town. Brookfield is drained primarily by the Branch River and Pike Brook, within the Piscataqua River (coastal) watershed, though the western edge of the town is in the Merrimack River watershed and the northernmost tip of the town is in the Saco River watershed. Copple Crown Mountain, along the western border of Brookfield and the highest point in town, has an elevation of 1,868 feet (569 m) above sea level.

Brookfield is served by New Hampshire Route 109.

== Demographics ==
Historical population
Census	Pop.	Note	%±
1800	504		—
1810	657		30.4%
1820	690		5.0%
1830	679		−1.6%
1840	553		−18.6%
1850	552		−0.2%
1860	510		−7.6%
1870	416		−18.4%
1880	428		2.9%
1890	349		−18.5%
1900	296		−15.2%
1910	247		−16.6%
1920	186		−24.7%
1930	166		−10.8%
1940	142		−14.5%
1950	159		12.0%
1960	145		−8.8%
1970	198		36.6%
1980	385		94.4%
1990	518		34.5%
2000	604		16.6%
2010	712		17.9%
2020	755		6.0%
2024 (est.)	824		9.1%
U.S. Decennial Census

As of the census of 2000, there were 604 people, 236 households, and 180 families residing in the town. The population density was 26.4 inhabitants per square mile (10.2/km^{2}). There were 280 housing units at an average density of 12.2 per square mile (4.7/km^{2}). The racial makeup of the town was 99.01% White, 0.33% Native American, 0.17% Pacific Islander, and 0.50% from two or more races. Hispanic or Latino of any race were 0.33% of the population.

There were 236 households, out of which 30.5% had children under the age of 18 living with them, 66.5% were married couples living together, 6.8% had a female householder with no husband present, and 23.7% were non-families. 18.2% of all households were made up of individuals, and 7.2% had someone living alone who was 65 years of age or older. The average household size was 2.56 and the average family size was 2.93.

In the town, the population was spread out, with 23.3% under the age of 18, 5.5% from 18 to 24, 25.3% from 25 to 44, 29.1% from 45 to 64, and 16.7% who were 65 years of age or older. The median age was 43 years. For every 100 females, there were 94.2 males. For every 100 females age 18 and over, there were 91.3 males.

The median income for a household in the town was $52,132, and the median income for a family was $54,688. Males had a median income of $36,154 versus $26,719 for females. The per capita income for the town was $25,745. About 1.1% of families and 1.5% of the population were below the poverty line, including none of those under age 18 and 1.9% of those age 65 or over.

=== Adjacent municipalities ===
- Wolfeboro (north)
- Wakefield (east)
- Middleton (south)
- New Durham (southwest)
