= Branch River (New Hampshire) =

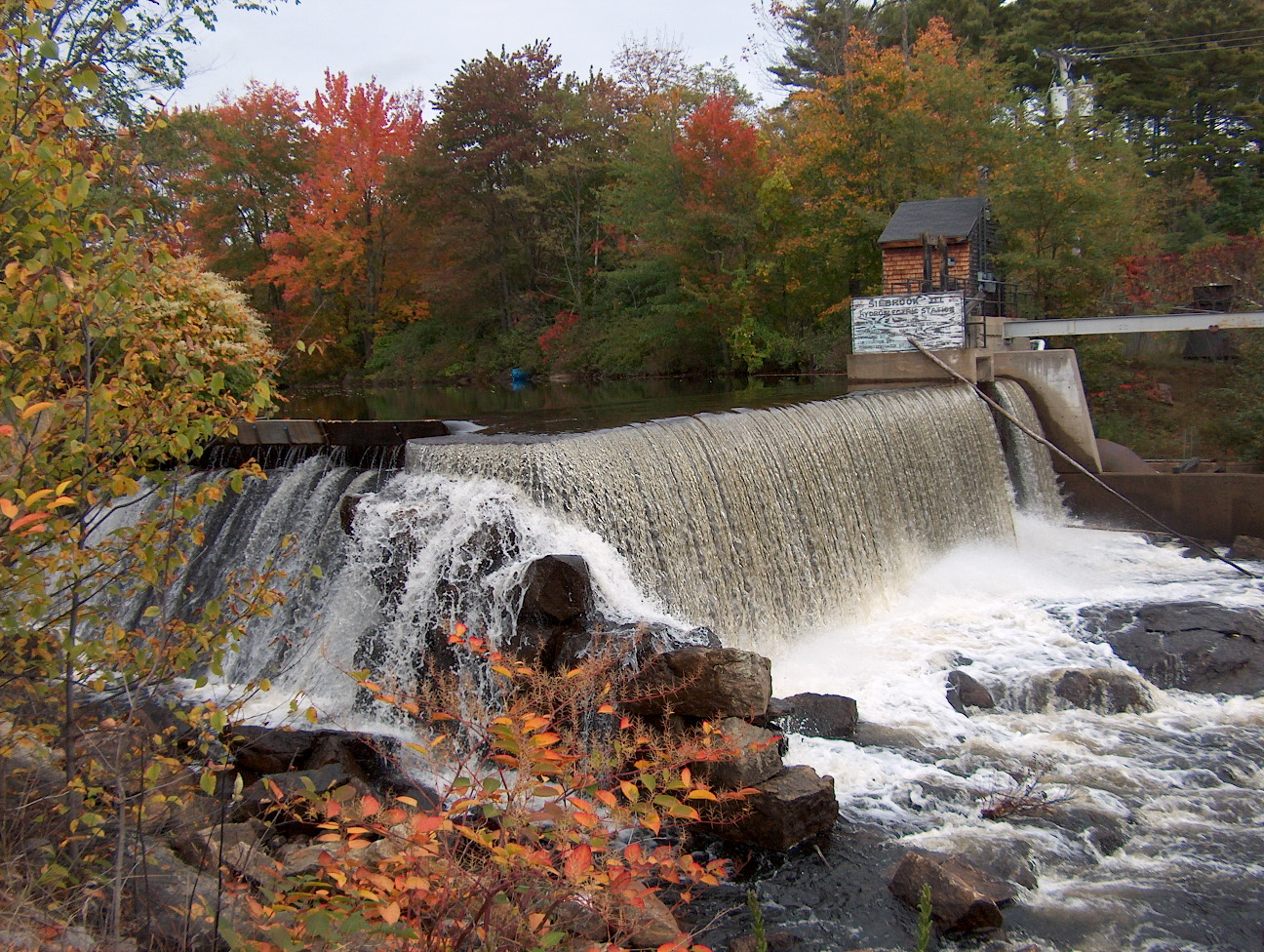
- Branch River in Union, New Hampshire (2008)

- Location within New Hampshire Location within the United States

Location
- Country: United States
- State: New Hampshire
- Counties: Carroll, Strafford
- Towns: Wakefield, Milton

Physical characteristics
- Source: Lovell Lake
  - location: Sanbornville
  - coordinates: 43°33′9″N 71°1′31″W
  - elevation: 572 ft (174 m)
- Mouth: Salmon Falls River/Northeast Pond
  - location: Milton
  - coordinates: 43°27′44″N 70°58′22″W
  - elevation: 413 ft (126 m)
- Length: 11.9 mi (19.2 km)

Basin features
- Tributaries
  - right: Churchill Brook/Pike Brook, Jones Brook

The Branch River is an 11.9-mile (19.2 km) long river located in eastern New Hampshire in the United States. It is a tributary of the Salmon Falls River, part of the Piscataqua River watershed leading to the Atlantic Ocean.

The river begins at the outlet of Lovell Lake at Sanbornville, a village in the town of Wakefield, New Hampshire. The river turns south, paralleling New Hampshire Route 16, passes through the village of Union, and turns southeast to reach the Salmon Falls River in Northeast Pond, within the town of Milton.

A significant tributary is Jones Brook.

== See also ==
- List of rivers of New Hampshire
