= Wakefield, New Hampshire =

- Town
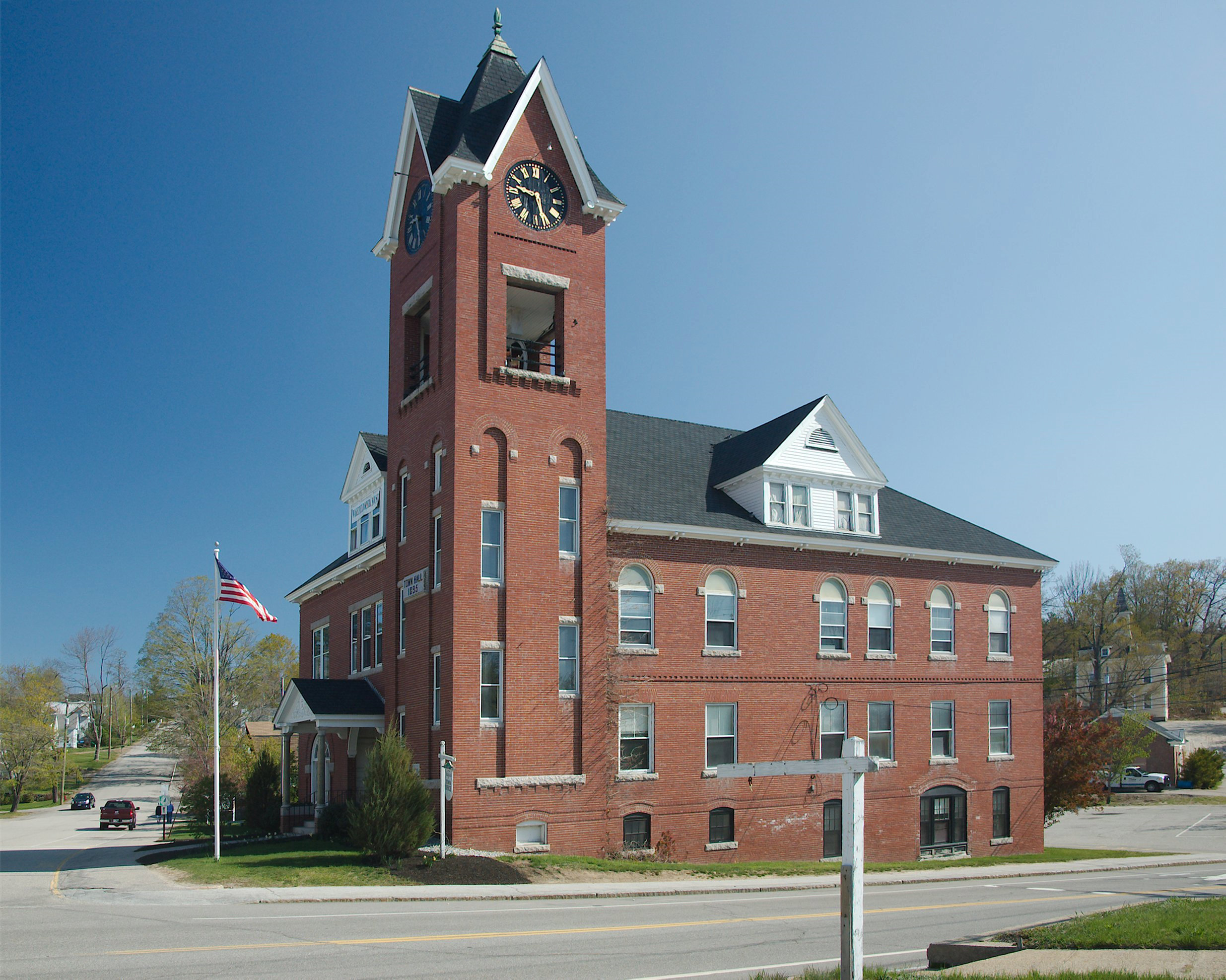
- Wakefield Town Hall

- Flag Seal

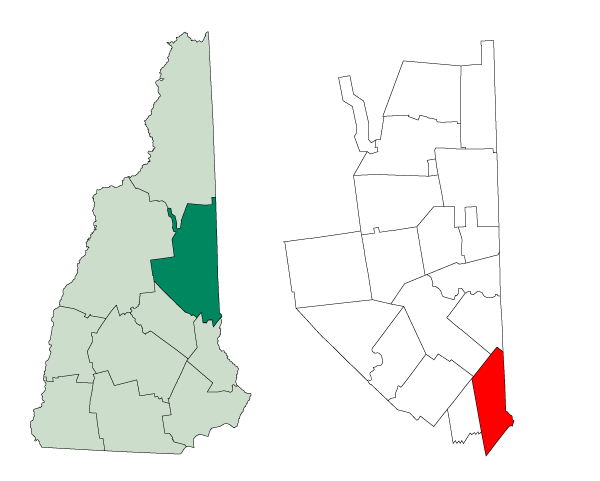
- Location in Carroll County, New Hampshire
- Coordinates: 43°34′06″N 71°00′35″W
- Country: United States
- State: New Hampshire
- County: Carroll
- Incorporated: 1774
- Villages: East Wakefield; North Wakefield; Province Lake; Sanbornville; Union; Wakefield Corner; Woodman

Area
  - Total: 44.9 sq mi (116.3 km^{2})
  - Land: 39.6 sq mi (102.6 km^{2})
  - Water: 5.3 sq mi (13.6 km^{2}) 11.71%
- Elevation: 610 ft (190 m)

Population (2020)
  - Total: 5,201
  - Density: 131/sq mi (50.7/km^{2})
- Time zone: UTC-5 (Eastern)
  - Summer (DST): UTC-4 (Eastern)
- ZIP codes: 03830 (East Wakefield); 03872 (Sanbornville); 03887 (Union)
- Area code: 603
- FIPS code: 33-78180
- GNIS feature ID: 873743
- Website: www.wakefieldnh.gov

Wakefield is a town in Carroll County, New Hampshire, United States. The population was 5,201 at the 2020 census, and an estimated 5,558 in 2025. The town includes the villages of Wakefield Corner (the original town center), East Wakefield, North Wakefield, Sanbornville, Union, Woodman and Province Lake. Wakefield Corner, popular with tourists, is a picturesque hilltop village of antique buildings. The state of Maine forms the eastern border of Wakefield.

== History ==
Initially a native settlement, Wakefield was attacked by John Lovewell during Father Rale's War. Settled later by colonists from Dover and Somersworth, the town was granted in 1749 by John Mason. It was called "East Town" before being incorporated as Wakefield in 1774 by Governor John Wentworth. Wakefield, in Yorkshire, England, is near Wentworth Castle, the home of the Wentworth ancestors.

The New Hampshire town developed as an important sledge and stage stop between the seacoast and the White Mountains. The Wakefield Inn, built in 1804 beside the principal trade route through Wakefield Corner, remains operating today.

Although the soil was considered "stubborn", farmers made it productive. Lumber became a chief product, and by 1859 there were five sawmills, five gristmills, and ten shingle, clapboard and planing mills. Shoemaking was another local industry. When the Portsmouth, Great Falls and Conway Railroad arrived in 1871, the center of Wakefield shifted from Wakefield Corner to Sanbornville, which today remains the retail district of town.

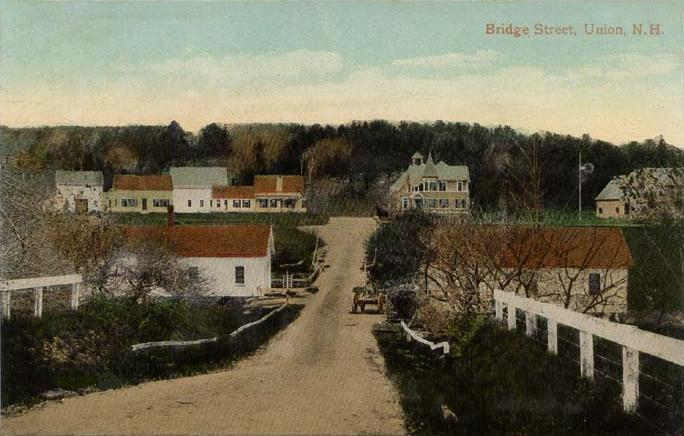
Bridge Street in 1916 (Union)

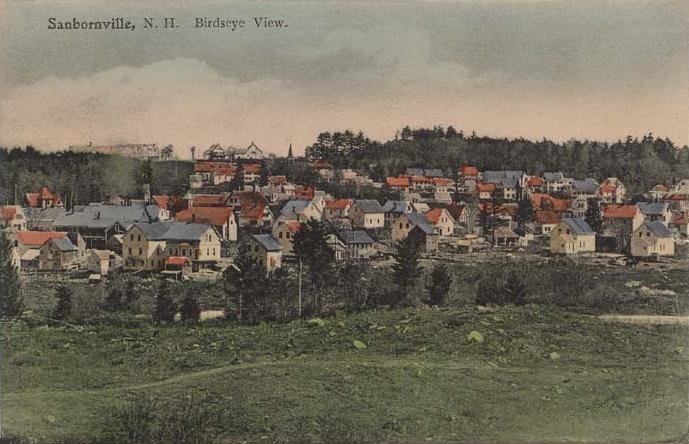
Bird's-eye View in 1908 (Sanbornville)

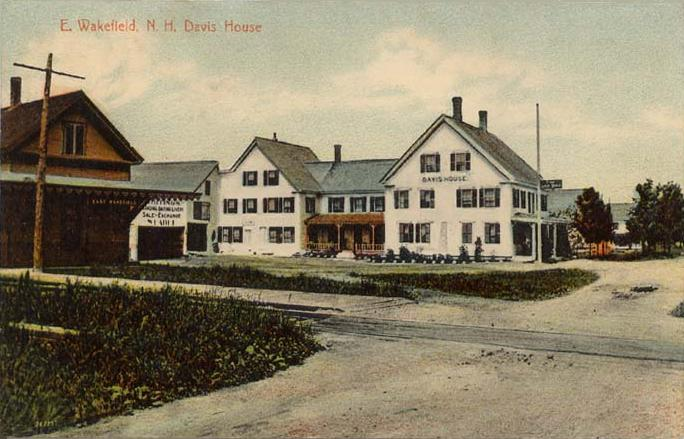
Davis House Inn in 1909 (East Wakefield)

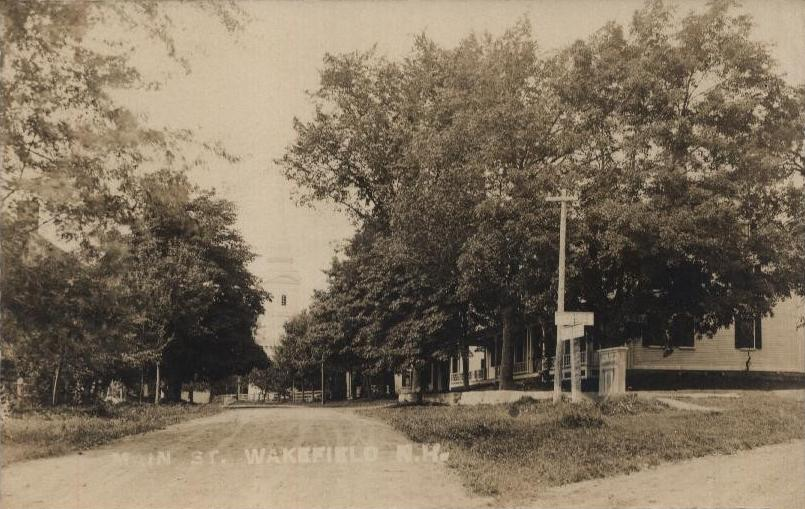
Main Street in 1909

== Geography ==
According to the United States Census Bureau, the town has a total area of 44.9 square miles (116.3 km^{2}), of which 39.6 square miles (102.6 km^{2}) are land and 5.3 square miles (13.6 km^{2}) are water, comprising 11.71% of the town.

Wakefield is at the head of several river systems. The northwestern part of the town is drained by the Pine River, a northwestward-flowing tributary of Ossipee Lake, which flows out to the east as the Ossipee River. Pine River Pond in Wakefield serves as the river's headwaters. The northernmost corner of town is in Province Lake, which drains north into the South River, a tributary of the Ossipee River. Belleau Lake and Balch Pond drain the northeastern part of the town, flowing east into the Little Ossipee River in Maine, another tributary of the Ossipee River. Via the Ossipee, the north half of Wakefield is part of the Saco River watershed. Great East Lake is in the southeastern part of Wakefield, extending into Maine. The lake's outlet is the headwaters of the Salmon Falls River, forming the New Hampshire-Maine boundary, and flowing south into Horn Pond. Lovell Lake, in the south-central part of the town, flows out to the west via the Branch River through Sanbornville. The river then turns south through Union Meadows in the southernmost part of the town, on its way to join the Salmon Falls River in Milton. Via the Salmon Falls, the southern half of Wakefield is part of the Piscataqua River watershed, reaching the Atlantic Ocean at Portsmouth. Of Wakefield's lakes, Province, Balch, Great East, and Horn Pond span the Maine border. The highest point in Wakefield is the summit of Long Mountain, at 1,110 feet (340 m) above sea level, along the town's western border.

Five named villages are within the town limits: Sanbornville, Wakefield village proper ("Wakefield Corner"), East Wakefield, North Wakefield and Union. Sanbornville, the primary settlement in the town, lies at the west end of Lovell Lake, next to the lake's outlet. The village is at the intersection of New Hampshire Routes 109 and 153. Route 16 bypasses the village to the west. Wakefield village occupies a hill just north of Sanbornville on Route 153. The village of Union occupies the southernmost corner of the town, at the intersection of Route 153 and Route 16 (at the northern end of the Spaulding Turnpike). East Wakefield is on Route 153, containing the land east of Pine River Pond and north to the Effingham town line. North Wakefield lies along Route 16 on the west side of Pine River Pond near the town line with Ossipee.

=== Adjacent municipalities ===
- Effingham (north)
- Parsonsfield, Maine (northeast)
- Newfield, Maine (east)
- Acton, Maine (east)
- Milton (south)
- Middleton (southwest)
- Brookfield (west)
- Wolfeboro (northwest)
- Ossipee (northwest)

== Demographics ==
Historical population
Census	Pop.	Note	%±
1790	646		—
1800	835		29.3%
1810	1,166		39.6%
1820	1,518		30.2%
1830	1,470		−3.2%
1840	1,596		8.6%
1850	1,405		−12.0%
1860	1,478		5.2%
1870	1,185		−19.8%
1880	1,392		17.5%
1890	1,528		9.8%
1900	1,645		7.7%
1910	1,543		−6.2%
1920	1,335		−13.5%
1930	1,186		−11.2%
1940	1,158		−2.4%
1950	1,267		9.4%
1960	1,223		−3.5%
1970	1,420		16.1%
1980	2,237		57.5%
1990	3,057		36.7%
2000	4,252		39.1%
2010	5,078		19.4%
2020	5,201		2.4%
2024 (est.)	5,508		5.9%
U.S. Decennial Census

As of the census of 2000, there were 4,252 people, 1,685 households, and 1,213 families residing in the town. The population density was 108.1 inhabitants per square mile (41.7/km^{2}). There were 3,331 housing units at an average density of 84.7 per square mile (32.7/km^{2}). The racial makeup of the town was 98.21% White, 0.09% African American, 0.45% Native American, 0.19% Asian, 0.19% from other races, and 0.87% from two or more races. Hispanic or Latino of any race were 0.56% of the population.

There were 1,685 households, out of which 31.0% had children under the age of 18 living with them, 60.1% were married couples living together, 8.0% had a female householder with no husband present, and 28.0% were non-families. 21.8% of all households were made up of individuals, and 10.3% had someone living alone who was 65 years of age or older. The average household size was 2.52 and the average family size was 2.92.

In the town, the population was spread out, with 25.7% under the age of 18, 5.2% from 18 to 24, 28.4% from 25 to 44, 25.7% from 45 to 64, and 15.0% who were 65 years of age or older. The median age was 40 years. For every 100 females, there were 97.9 males. For every 100 females age 18 and over, there were 95.2 males.

The median income for a household in the town was $42,500, and the median income for a family was $45,774. Males had a median income of $35,804 versus $24,898 for females. The per capita income for the town was $21,507. About 5.1% of families and 7.1% of the population were below the poverty line, including 8.9% of those under age 18 and 5.8% of those age 65 or over.

== Notable people ==
- Melissa Fifield (born 1992), racing driver
- Joshua G. Hall (1828–1898), US congressman
- Joseph Kenney (born 1960), member of the Executive Council of New Hampshire
- Harry Libbey (1843–1913), US congressman
- Freddy Meyer (born 1981), defenseman for four NHL teams
- William Nathaniel Rogers (1892–1945), US congressman
- George A. Wentworth (1835–1906), teacher and author of textbooks
