= Salmon Falls River =

River in New Hampshire, United States

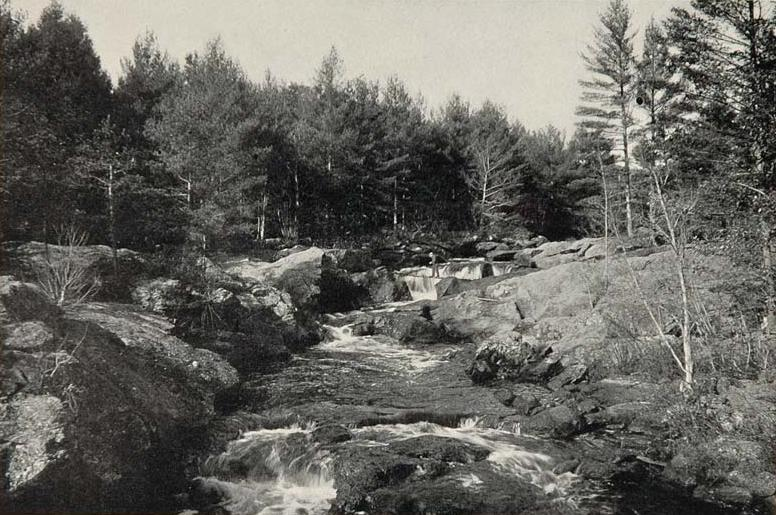
- Salmon Falls River c. 1903

- Location within New Hampshire Location within Maine Location within the United States

Location
- Country: United States
- States: New Hampshire, Maine
- Counties: Carroll, NH, Strafford, NH, York, ME
- Towns and cities: Wakefield, NH, Acton, ME, Milton, NH, Lebanon, ME, Rochester, NH, Berwick, ME, Somersworth, NH, Rollinsford, NH, South Berwick, ME, Dover, NH, Eliot, ME

Physical characteristics
- Source: Horn Pond
  - location: Wakefield, NH/Acton, ME
  - coordinates: 43°33′10″N 70°57′13″W
  - elevation: 560 ft (170 m)
- Mouth: Piscataqua River
  - location: Dover, NH/Eliot, ME
  - coordinates: 43°10′33″N 70°49′26″W
  - elevation: 0 ft (0 m)
- Length: 38 mi (61 km)

Basin features
- Tributaries
  - left: Little River, Great Works River
  - right: Branch River

The Salmon Falls River is a tributary of the Piscataqua River in the U.S. states of Maine and New Hampshire. It rises at Great East Lake, Newichawannock Canal, and Horn Pond and flows south-southeast for approximately 38 miles (61 km), forming the border between York County, Maine, and Strafford County, New Hampshire.

The Salmon Falls River joins the Cochecho River near Dover, New Hampshire, to form the Piscataqua River.

It provides hydroelectric power at the New Hampshire towns of Milton, North Rochester, East Rochester, New Hampshire, Somersworth, and Rollinsford, and in Maine at Berwick and South Berwick. The final three miles of the river, from South Berwick to the Piscataqua, are tidal.

Local Abenaki Indians called the river Newichawannock (New-ik-a-WAN-nok), meaning "river with many falls". See Newichawannock Canal

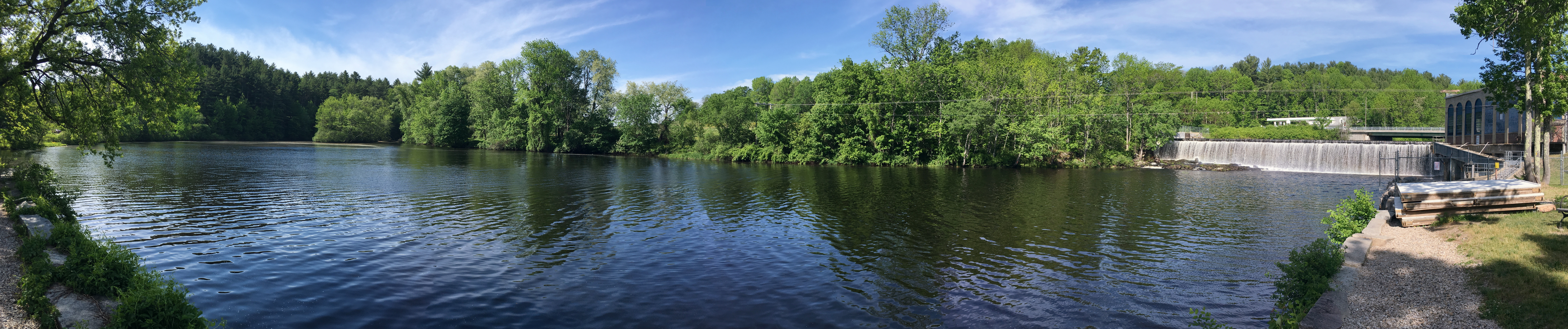
Salmon Falls River between South Berwick and Rollinsford

== See also ==
- List of rivers of Maine
- List of rivers of New Hampshire
