= Acton, Maine =

Town in Maine, United States

- Town
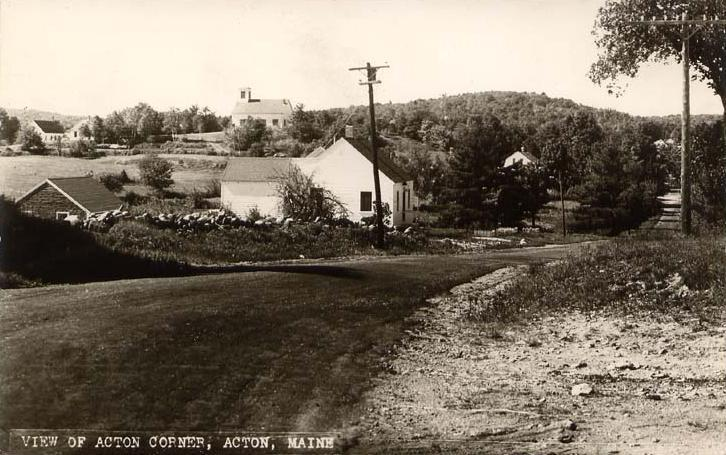
- Acton Corner c. 1920

- Logo

- Location within Maine
- Coordinates: 43°30′05″N 70°54′05″W
- Country: United States
- State: Maine
- County: York
- Incorporated: 1830

Government
  - Type: Board of Selectmen

Area
  - Total: 41.11 sq mi (106.47 km^{2})
  - Land: 37.72 sq mi (97.69 km^{2})
  - Water: 3.39 sq mi (8.78 km^{2})
- Elevation: 745 ft (227 m)

Population (2020)
  - Total: 2,671
  - Density: 71/sq mi (27.3/km^{2})
- Time zone: UTC-5 (Eastern (EST))
  - Summer (DST): UTC-4 (EDT)
- ZIP code: 04001
- Area code: 207
- FIPS code: 23-00275
- GNIS feature ID: 582315
- Website: www.actonmaine.org

Acton is a town in York County, Maine, United States. The population was 2,671 at the 2020 census. It includes the villages of Acton, Miller Corner and South Acton. The town is home to the Acton Fairground, which holds the Acton Fair every late summer. It is part of the Portland-South Portland-Biddeford metropolitan area.

== History ==
It was part of the extensive Ossipee Tract sold on November 28, 1668, by Newichawannock Chief Captain Sunday (or Wesumbe) to Francis Small, a trader from Kittery. Small sold a half interest in the tract to Major Nicholas Shapleigh of Eliot. In 1770, heirs found the unrecorded deed and divided the land, with Shapleigh's descendants awarded one half of Limerick and all of Parsonsfield and Shapleigh. First called Hubbardstown Plantation, Shapleigh was in 1785 incorporated and named in honor of Nicholas Shapleigh. Its western portion was set off and incorporated on March 6, 1830, as Acton, named after Acton, England.

The town was first settled at Acton village in 1776 by Benjamin Kimens, Clement Steele and John York, all from York. In 1779, Joseph Parsons built a gristmill on the Salmon Falls River near Wakefield, New Hampshire. Other mills followed at Acton's various water power sites, including sawmills, gristmills, a hemp mill, a carding mill, a felt mill, a tannery and a shoe factory. In 1877, a vein of silver was discovered near Goding Creek and the Lebanon border. Prospectors dug mines during the 1880s, after which the enterprise declined.

Although much of the soil was poor for farming, the ridges yielded good crops. In 1866, the Shapleigh & Acton Agricultural Society was formed and commenced sponsoring an annual fair and cattle show. It continues each late summer as the Acton Fair.

The last living member of the Battle of Bunker Hill, Ralph Farnham, lived in Acton for 80 years before his death in 1860 at the age of 104.

== Geography ==
According to the United States Census Bureau, the town has a total area of 41.11 square miles (106.47 km^{2}), of which 37.72 square miles (97.69 km^{2}) is land and 3.39 square miles (8.78 km^{2}) is water. Acton is drained by the Little Ossipee River, the Mousam River and the Salmon Falls River. The highest elevation in town is Hussey Hill, 1,051 feet (320 m) above sea level. Hussey Hill is also Maine's southernmost 1,000-foot (300-meter) mountain and only elevation above 1,000 feet in town.

The town is crossed by State Route 109. Acton borders the towns of Newfield to the north, Shapleigh to the east, Lebanon to the south, Sanford to the southeast, and the New Hampshire towns of Milton to the west and Wakefield to the northwest.

== Demographics ==
Historical population
| Census | Pop. | Note | %± |
|---|---|---|---|
| 1830 | 1,398 | | — |
| 1840 | 1,401 | | 0.2% |
| 1850 | 1,359 | | −3.0% |
| 1860 | 1,218 | | −10.4% |
| 1870 | 1,008 | | −17.2% |
| 1880 | 1,050 | | 4.2% |
| 1890 | 878 | | −16.4% |
| 1900 | 778 | | −11.4% |
| 1910 | 603 | | −22.5% |
| 1920 | 499 | | −17.2% |
| 1930 | 449 | | −10.0% |
| 1940 | 392 | | −12.7% |
| 1950 | 473 | | 20.7% |
| 1960 | 501 | | 5.9% |
| 1970 | 697 | | 39.1% |
| 1980 | 1,228 | | 76.2% |
| 1990 | 1,727 | | 40.6% |
| 2000 | 2,145 | | 24.2% |
| 2010 | 2,447 | | 14.1% |
| 2020 | 2,671 | | 9.2% |

=== 2010 census ===
As of the census of 2010, there were 2,447 people, 1,014 households, and 689 families living in the town. The population density was 64.9 inhabitants per square mile (25.1/km^{2}). There were 2,199 housing units at an average density of 58.3 units per square mile (22.5 units/km^{2}). The racial makeup of the town was 98.0% White, 0.4% African American, 0.4% Native American, 0.3% Asian, 0.4% from other races, and 0.5% from two or more races. Hispanic or Latino of any race were 1.2% of the population.

There were 1,014 households, of which 27.9% had children under the age of 18 living with them, 56.9% were married couples living together, 6.6% had a female householder with no husband present, 4.4% had a male householder with no wife present, and 32.1% were non-families. 25.0% of all households were made up of individuals, and 9.6% had someone living alone who was 65 years of age or older. The average household size was 2.41 and the average family size was 2.87.

The median age in the town was 45.7 years. 20.9% of residents were under the age of 18; 6.4% were between the ages of 18 and 24; 21.8% were from 25 to 44; 35.2% were from 45 to 64; and 15.8% were 65 years of age or older. The gender makeup of the town was 51.0% male and 49.0% female.

=== 2000 census ===
As of the census of 2000, there were 2,145 people, 855 households, and 615 families living in the town. The population density was 57.0 inhabitants per square mile (22.0/km^{2}). There were 1,910 housing units at an average density of 50.7 units per square mile (19.6 units/km^{2}). The racial makeup of the town was 98.41% White, 0.09% African American, 0.33% Native American, 0.23% Asian, and 0.93% from two or more races. Hispanic or Latino of any race were 0.89% of the population.

There were 855 households, out of which 30.3% had children under the age of 18 living with them, 62.5% were married couples living together, 6.0% had a female householder with no husband present, and 28.0% were non-families. 22.0% of all households were made up of individuals, and 8.7% had someone living alone who was 65 years of age or older. The average household size was 2.51 and the average family size was 2.91.

In the town, the population was spread out, with 25.4% under the age of 18, 4.1% from 18 to 24, 28.2% from 25 to 44, 26.7% from 45 to 64, and 15.6% who were 65 years of age or older. The median age was 41 years. For every 100 females, there were 101.0 males. For every 100 females age 18 and over, there were 98.1 males.

The median income for a household in the town was $39,036, and the median income for a family was $45,353. Males had a median income of $32,500 versus $24,643 for females. The per capita income for the town was $19,447. About 7.0% of families and 10.5% of the population were below the poverty line, including 16.1% of those under age 18 and 3.2% of those age 65 or over.

Voter Registration and Party Enrollment as of November 2012
| Party | Total Voters | Percentage |
|---|---|---|
| Unenrolled | 751 | 39.4% |
| Republican | 593 | 31.1% |
| Democratic | 478 | 25.1% |
| Green Independent | 84 | 4.4% |
| Total | 1,906 | 100% |

== Education ==
The children of Acton in grades Pre-K–8 go to Acton Elementary School, which is part of the Acton Schools Department. High school students go to Sanford High School.

== Site of interest ==
- Acton-Shapleigh Historical Society & Museum

== Notable people ==
- Richard Nass, State Senator
- Nathan Clifford Ricker, architect and professor at the University of Illinois
