= Circumferential Highway (Nashua) =

Road in New Hampshire, US

Coordinates: 42°43′27.0″N 71°26′16.5″W

- Map of Hillsborough County in southern New Hampshire with Circumferential Highway highlighted in red

Route information
- Length: 1.3 mi (2.1 km)

Major junctions
- West end: US 3 / Everett Turnpike in Nashua
- East end: NH 3A in Hudson

Location
- Country: United States
- State: New Hampshire
- Counties: Hillsborough

Highway system
- New Hampshire Highway System; Interstate; US; State; Turnpikes

The Circumferential Highway is the common name for a freeway bypass around the city of Nashua in southern New Hampshire, most of which has not yet been built. The purpose of the highway was to provide easier access to the F.E. Everett Turnpike and U.S. Route 3 in Nashua.

Most of the highway was planned to be built in Hudson, with small sections also built through the towns of Litchfield and Merrimack, as well as the city of Nashua. In March 2026, the New Hampshire Department of Transportation announced plans to cancel the remaining portion of the project.

The extant road does not have a state route designation, and is signed as "TO US 3 / Everett Turnpike" in the westbound direction and "TO NH 3A" in the eastbound direction.

== Route description ==
The only segment built is a short 2-mile-long (3.2 km) freeway between US 3, the Daniel Webster Highway, and NH Route 3A. This section utilizes the Sagamore Bridge, one of the two bridges over the Merrimack River connecting Hudson to Nashua. The completed section begins at US 3, has a single interchange with the D.W. Highway, crosses the river, and terminates at NH Route 3A in Hudson.

== History ==
=== Justification ===
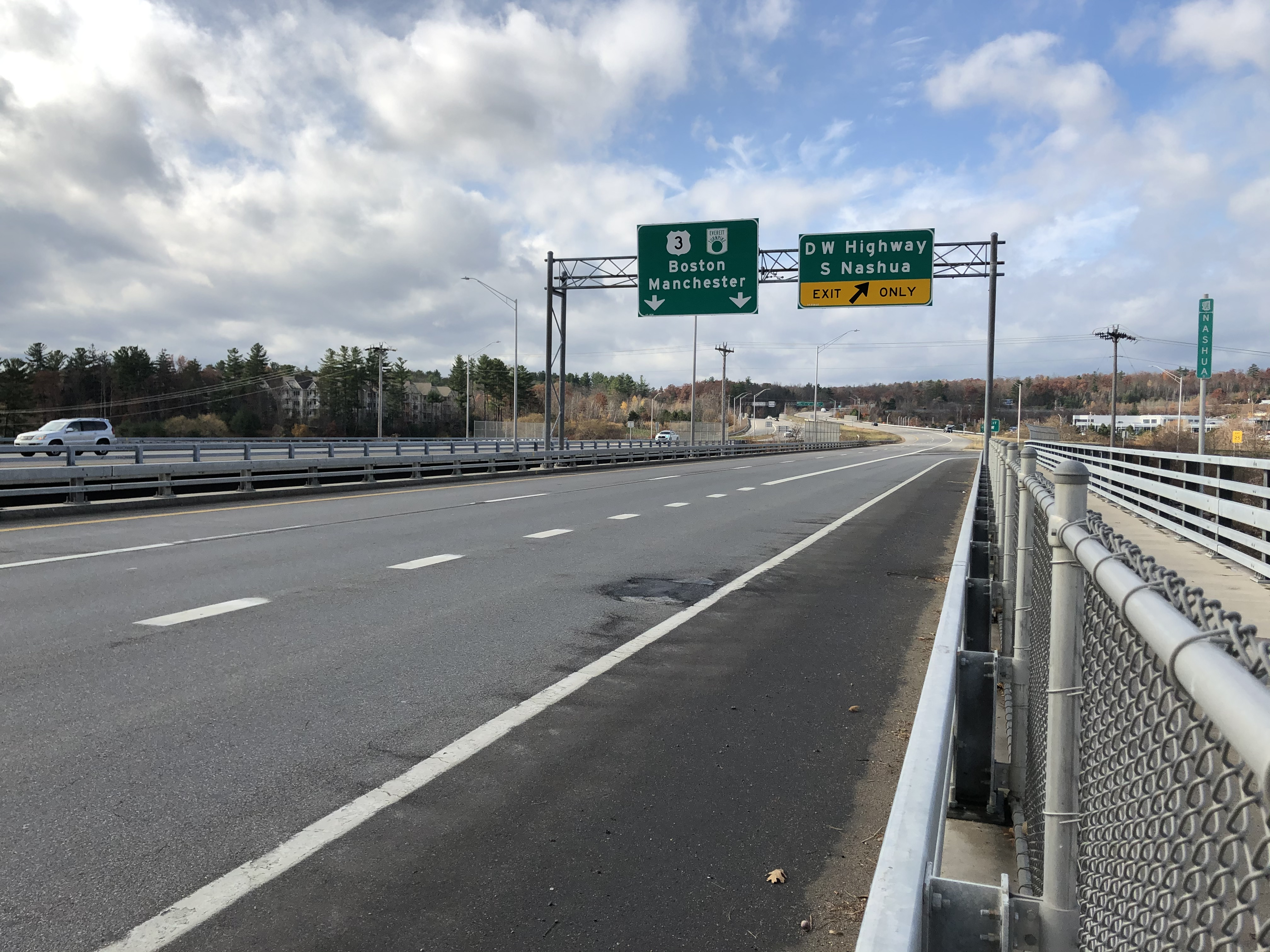
The Circumferential Highway where it crosses the Merrimack River on the Sagamore Bridge

The Circumferential Highway has been planned since the 1950s, as the need for such a road has been apparent for a long time. To date, however, only a short 2-mile (3.2 km) segment has been built. One of the major provisions of the plan for the highway is to provide a new crossing over the Merrimack River. Currently there are four bridges over the Merrimack River between Lowell, Massachusetts, and Manchester, New Hampshire. Drivers wishing to access U.S. Route 3 from the east side of the river have the following options (listed here from south to north):

- The Tyngsborough Bridge, which provides access to US 3 via Massachusetts Route 113.
- The Sagamore Bridge, connecting the Everett Turnpike (US 3) to New Hampshire Route 3A in Hudson, with an intermediate exit at the Daniel Webster Highway in the South Nashua retail district.
- The Taylor Falls/Veterans Memorial Bridges (a.k.a. The Hudson Bridge), which puts traffic through the city streets of Nashua, such as Hollis Street and Canal Street, streets which cross several train tracks, and which lack the capacity to handle the demand.
- Raymond Wieczorek Drive via the Pearl Harbor Memorial Bridge to the Manchester Airport (built in 2011). This provides a connection between NH Route 3A in the southern tip of Manchester, a few miles south of Interstate 293, and the Everett Turnpike in the southern corner of Bedford, with an interchange connecting the road with US 3.

The Circumferential Highway would provide an additional river crossing between Nashua and Manchester, where one does not exist. The Sagamore Bridge crossing south of downtown Nashua was expanded and forms the only portion of the Circumferential Highway that has been constructed.

=== Opposition ===
The project has not been without controversy. Political and environmental roadblocks have caused delays for years. The highway would be built mostly through the town of Hudson, as well as small portions of Litchfield and Merrimack. This would require the seizure and destruction of many homes, and the filling in of several wetlands. A 1993 report by the EPA expressed an "intent to veto" the project as it was then planned, all but killing the full highway. Of particular concern is the impact on the Pennichuck Brook watershed, a series of ponds and creeks along the Nashua/Merrimack border. A second study has been ongoing since 1995, but no action has been made on it.

Additionally, despite the population boom, there may no longer be the need for the entirety of the road as planned. The part of the highway that has been built, including the Sagamore Bridge rebuild, has bypassed the worst traffic problem, and allows easy access to U.S. 3 as well as the D.W. Highway shopping district. Widening of Route 3A in Hudson has alleviated a lot of the traffic problem as well. Travellers also have alternate routes, especially for longer distance north–south travel. Drivers heading north of Manchester or south of Lowell can take I-93 to the east. Also, US 3 in Nashua has been extensively rebuilt and widened, improving access and capacity.

=== Proposed alternatives ===
Ten different alternatives have been proposed to the road. A brief description of some of them:

- A "No Build" option, which leaves the entire situation at the current status quo.
- Alternatives to the northern crossing, planned in the vicinity of the Pennichuck Watershed, by choosing a less damaging crossing site. This could possibly include crossings that do not include connections to the Everett Turnpike.
- Rather than a four lane freeway, the road could be built as a "super-two" highway, with at-grade crossings, a lower speed limit, and limited driveway access.
- A southern crossing that may also include the removal of the Taylor Falls/Veterans Memorial bridges connecting Hudson and Nashua. This option may alleviate much of the traffic problems, but would also generate considerable social and economic stress.

== Future ==
Although recent road improvements have helped alleviate some of the traffic problems, other problems that the Circumferential Highway project is supposed to remedy still have not been addressed:

- There is still no river crossing between the Taylor Falls/Veterans Memorial Bridges and the Pearl Harbor Memorial bridge in Manchester. Residents of Litchfield or Merrimack must travel 5 to 6 miles (8.0 to 9.7 km) in either direction to cross the river. This has been cited as the major cause for keeping the project going despite years of historical setbacks.
- Use of the Taylor Falls/Veterans Memorial Bridges still causes problems. East Hollis Street can still be a huge traffic problem, especially with the train crossings so close to the bridge. The US 3 Exit 5 rebuild and expansion has helped access at the highway, but getting to and from the highway can still create problems.
- Though eminent domain has been cited as a possible concern, the towns of Hudson and Litchfield have specifically avoided zoning for additional construction near the proposed path of the highway. Though no official right-of-way has been established, this has created a virtual right-of-way for most of the proposed course.

As of 2013, the northern terminus plan was considered abandoned by the New Hampshire Department of Transportation (NHDOT). In Merrimack, former easements are being reclaimed as buildable land.

As of March 2026, NHDOT is proposing to cancel the project.

== Exit list ==
The entire route is in Hillsborough County. All exits are unnumbered.

Location	mi	km	Destinations	Notes
Nashua	0.0	0.0	US 3 / Everett Turnpike / Spit Brook Road – Boston, Manchester, Concord	Western terminus; exit 2 on Everett Turnpike
Nashua	0.4	0.64	Daniel Webster Highway – South Nashua	Former US 3
Merrimack River	0.5	0.80	Sagamore Bridge	
Hudson	1.3	2.1	NH 3A – Hudson, Tynsborough, MA	Eastern terminus; at-grade intersection
1.000 mi = 1.609 km; 1.000 km = 0.621 mi

== See also ==
Several other road improvement projects have been considered to complement the Circumferential Highway:

- The now completed Broad Street Parkway along a realigned NH 130 was closely tied to this project. It has been completed as a two-lane road, and allows more direct access between the northwest Nashua commercial district along Broad and Amherst streets and central Nashua, allowing drivers to bypass several congested intersections.
- Amherst Street (NH 101A) widening is included in all proposals for the Circumferential Highway.
- Raymond Wieczorek Drive, completed in 2011, is a spur off the Everett Turnpike and provides a crossing of the Merrimack River a few miles south of I-293 in Manchester. It includes interchanges with US 3 and NH Route 3A.
