= Circumferential Highway =

Circumferential Highway may refer to one of the following beltways/orbital roads/ring roads:

== Barbados ==
- The ABC Highway, roughly defines the boundary of metropolitan capital city Bridgetown.

== Canada ==
- Nova Scotia Highway 111, known as the Dartmouth Circumferential Highway ("The Circ")
- Manitoba Highway 100 and 101, an orbital highway that circles Winnipeg, known as the Perimeter Highway. The southern portion (Hwy 100), is a four-lane divided highway that makes up the bypass route of the Trans-Canada Highway, and is heavily travelled. Much of it has been upgraded to freeway standards, but there remain several at-grade signalized intersections. The northern portion (Hwy 101), is a mix of two-lane and four-lane divided highway, with a most intersections being grade-separated. An incomplete Turbo Interchange currently exists at Hwy 101 and Lagimodiere (Hwy 59).

== Italy ==
- A90, known as the G.R.A. or Grande Raccordo Anulare ("Great Ring Road")

== Philippines ==
There are 6 Circumferential Roads in the Metro Manila area of the Philippines. See Major roads in Metro Manila.

== Puerto Rico ==
- Puerto Rico Highway 9, known as Ponce's Rafael (Churumba) Cordero Santiago Circumferential Highway, the Circumferential Highway of Ponce, Puerto Rico

== United States ==
- Circumferential Highway (Nashua), a partially built unnumbered bypass route around Nashua, New Hampshire, that has only been built as a short east-west connector road between U.S. 3/the Everett Turnpike in Nashua and Route 3A in Hudson, with one intersection at the Daniel Webster Highway in Nashua
- Massachusetts Route 128, originally known as (and sometimes still known as) the Circumferential Highway around Boston; most of it is concurrent with Interstate 95 or Interstate 93; the latter portion is no longer posted with 128 signage
- Vermont Route 289, the Chittenden County Circumferential Highway
- Interstate 495 around Washington, D.C. was known as the Circumferential Highway during its planning
- Interstate 465 around Indianapolis
