= Raymond Wieczorek Drive =

Road in Manchester, and New Hampshire

- Length: 2.994 mi (4.818 km)
- Location: Hillsborough, Rockingham
- West end: US 3 / Everett Turnpike in Bedford
- East end: Airport Road / Galaxy Way in Londonderry

Construction
- Inauguration: November 10, 2011

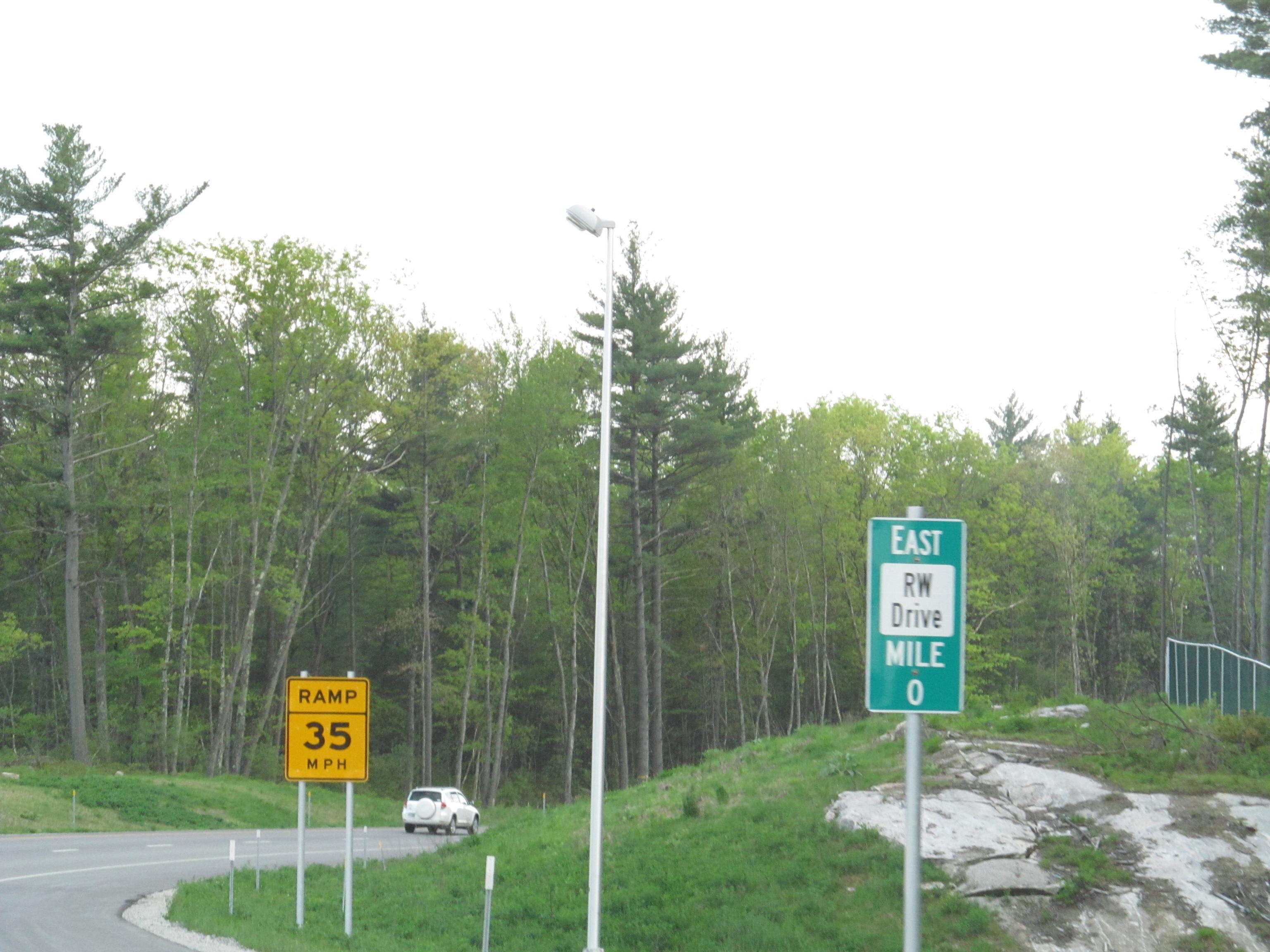
Mile 0 marker

Raymond Wieczorek Drive (RW Drive) is a 3-mile-long (5 km) expressway in Bedford, Manchester, and Londonderry, New Hampshire, connecting the Everett Turnpike to Manchester–Boston Regional Airport. The highway is named for Raymond Wieczorek, a five-term mayor of Manchester. The road opened to the public on November 10, 2011.

== Route description ==
Raymond Wieczorek Drive begins at an interchange in Bedford on the Everett Turnpike, adjacent to the Bedford Toll Plaza. The drive passes under the turnpike, then comes to an interchange with U.S. Route 3 (South River Road). The drive then crosses the Pearl Harbor Memorial Bridge over a set of railroad tracks, the Merrimack River, and New Hampshire Route 3A (Brown Avenue), entering the city of Manchester at the midpoint of the river. The drive, immediately when the bridge ends, enters the town of Londonderry. The drive then passes through a traffic-light controlled intersection with Roundstone Drive and Pettengill Road (opened December 21, 2015), then crosses the Sora-Currier USMC Memorial Bridge over a small valley. The drive passes through a roundabout intersecting Commerce Avenue and Executive Drive. Raymond Wieczorek Drive ends at a second roundabout, intersecting Airport Road and Galaxy Way.

== Exit list ==
All exits are unnumbered.

| County | Location | mi | km | Destinations | Notes |
|---|---|---|---|---|---|
| Hillsborough | Bedford | 0.000 | 0.000 | Everett Turnpike to I-293 / NH 101 – Bedford, Manchester, Nashua, Boston | Western terminus; exit 13 on Everett Turnpike |
| Hillsborough | Bedford | 0.962 | 1.548 | US 3 (South River Road) – Merrimack | |
| Hillsborough | Manchester | 1.271 | 2.045 | Pearl Harbor Memorial Bridge | |
| Rockingham | Londonderry | 1.748 | 2.813 | Roundstone Drive / Pettengill Road to NH 3A – Litchfield | At-grade intersection |
| Rockingham | Londonderry | 2.156 | 3.470 | Sora-Currier USMC Memorial Bridge | |
| Rockingham | Londonderry | 2.262 | 3.640 | Commerce Avenue / Executive Drive | Roundabout |
| Rockingham | Londonderry | 2.863 | 4.608 | Airport Road / Galaxy Way to NH 3A / Perimeter Road – Manchester-Boston Regional Airport | Roundabout; eastern terminus |
1.000 mi = 1.609 km; 1.000 km = 0.621 mi
