= New Hampshire Route 130 =

State highway in Hillsborough County, New Hampshire, US

New Hampshire Route 130
- Map of Hillsborough County in southern New Hampshire with NH 130 highlighted in red

Route information
- Maintained by NHDOT
- Length: 12.739 mi (20.501 km)

Major junctions
- West end: NH 13 in Brookline
- US 3 / Everett Turnpike in Nashua
- East end: NH 101A in Nashua

Location
- Country: United States
- State: New Hampshire
- Counties: Hillsborough

Highway system
- New Hampshire Highway System; Interstate; US; State; Turnpikes
← NH 129	→ NH 132

New Hampshire Route 130 (abbreviated NH 130) is a 12.739-mile-long (20.501 km) secondary east–west state highway in New Hampshire. The road runs between Brookline and Nashua, passing through the town of Hollis in the middle.

The western terminus of NH 130 is at the junction with New Hampshire Route 13 in Brookline as Milford Street. The eastern terminus of NH 130 is in Nashua at New Hampshire Route 101A (Amherst Street), at which point NH 130 is named Broad Street.

== Major intersections ==
The entire route is in Hillsborough County.

Location	mi	km	Destinations	Notes
Brookline	0.000	0.000	NH 13 – Townsend, MA, Milford, Manchester	Western terminus
Hollis	6.140	9.881	NH 122 – Amherst, Pepperell, MA	
Nashua	11.947– 12.039	19.227– 19.375	US 3 / Everett Turnpike – Boston, Merrimack, Manchester	Exit 6 on Everett Turnpike
Nashua	12.739	20.501	NH 101A	Eastern terminus
1.000 mi = 1.609 km; 1.000 km = 0.621 mi
