= Daniel Webster Highway =

Sections of U.S. Route 3 in New Hampshire

Coordinates: 43.837°N 71.658°W

U.S. Route 3
- Daniel Webster Highway

Route information
- Maintained by NHDOT
- Existed: May 16, 1922 (104 years ago)–present

Major junctions
- South end: Middlesex Road in Tyngsboro, MA
- I-93 in Franconia Notch State Park
- North end: R-257 in Chartierville, Quebec

Location
- Country: United States
- State: New Hampshire

Highway system
- United States Numbered Highway System; List; Special; Divided; New Hampshire Highway System; Interstate; US; State; Turnpikes
Auto trails

Daniel Webster Highway (also known as D.W. Highway or Webster Highway) is the name for several sections of U.S. Route 3 (or former alignments) in New Hampshire. The highway is named after 19th century statesman Daniel Webster, a New Hampshire native, and was dedicated on May 16, 1922.

== Extent ==
The following sections (or former sections) of U.S. Route 3 are named "Daniel Webster Highway":

1. From the Massachusetts state line to the south end of Main St. in Nashua (formerly U.S. 3)
2. From the southern boundary of Merrimack to the northern boundary of Bedford
3. From Webster St. in northern Manchester to the northern boundary of Hooksett
4. From U.S. Route 4 in the center of Boscawen to the southern boundary of Franklin
5. In Belmont from the boundary with Tilton to the Laconia Bypass
6. From Endicott St. in Weirs Beach, through Meredith, to the northern boundary of Center Harbor
7. From Bridgewater at its boundary with Ashland to the south end of Main St. in Plymouth
8. From the north end of Main St. in Plymouth, through Campton and Thornton, to the south end of Main St. in North Woodstock
9. From the southern boundary of Lincoln to the merge with Interstate 93 in Franconia Notch
10. From Interstate 93 north of Franconia Notch to Union St. in Whitefield
11. From the southern boundary of Stratford to the northern boundary of Columbia
12. From the southern boundary of Clarksville to the west end of Main St. in Pittsburg
13. From the east end of Main St. in Pittsburg to the Canada–United States border

== Sections ==
=== South Nashua ===
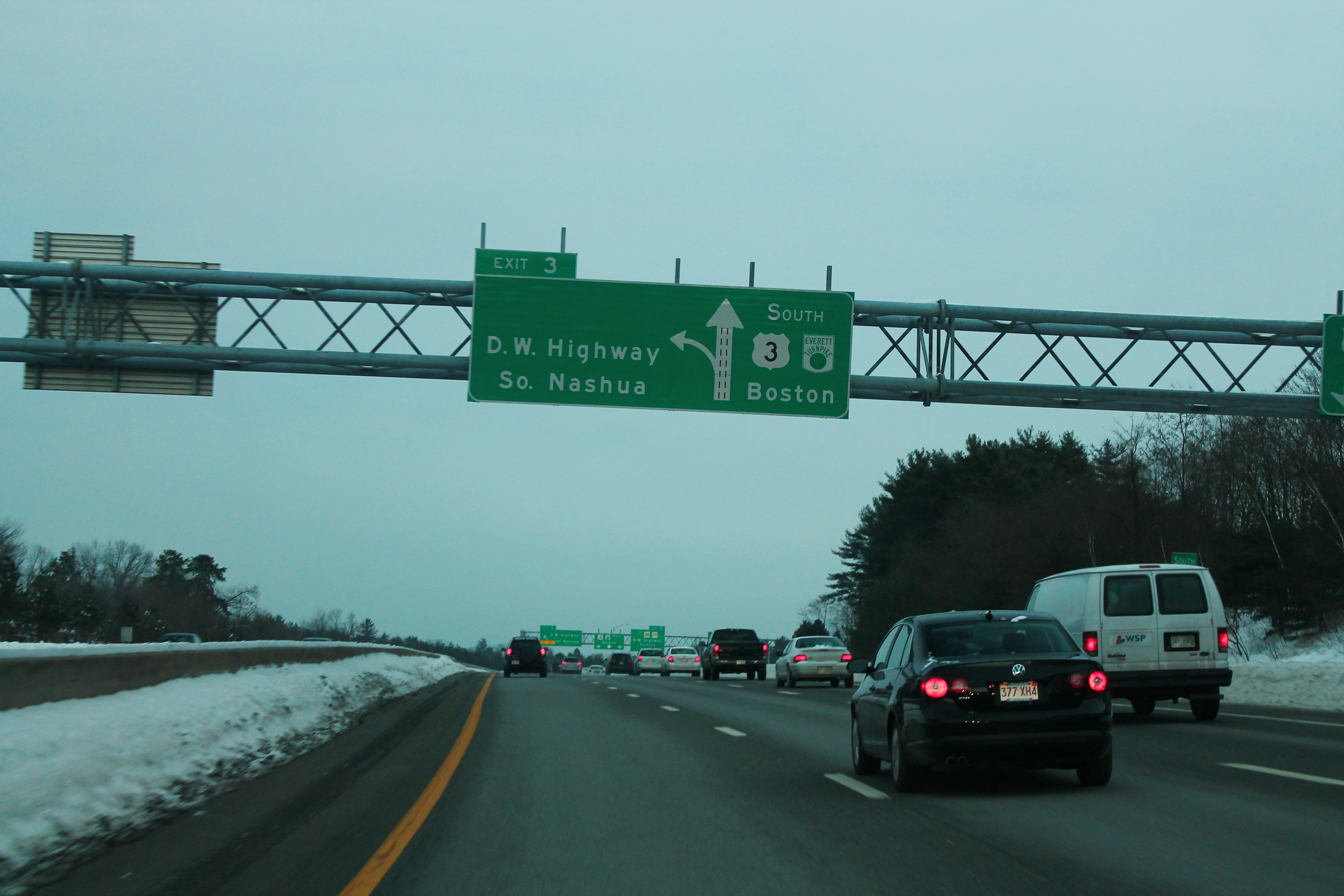
Signage for "D.W. Highway" in Nashua in 2013

Running from Tyngsborough, Massachusetts, up to the junction of Main Street, South Main Street, and East Dunstable Road, D.W. Highway in Nashua is the main thoroughfare for the South Nashua Commercial District in the southeastern portion of the city. Before the construction of the Everett Turnpike, this was also designated as U.S. Route 3. Access between the D.W. Highway and Route 3/Everett Turnpike:

- Full access via East Dunstable Road at Turnpike Exit 4.
- Partial access at Turnpike Exit 3; there is no Turnpike exit on the northbound side.
- Full access between the two roads at Turnpike Exit 2 (Circumferential Highway).
- Full access via Spit Brook Road at Turnpike Exit 1.
- Partial access at Route 3 Massachusetts Exit 91 (Middlesex Road); there is no southbound Route 3 exit here.

=== Merrimack and Bedford ===
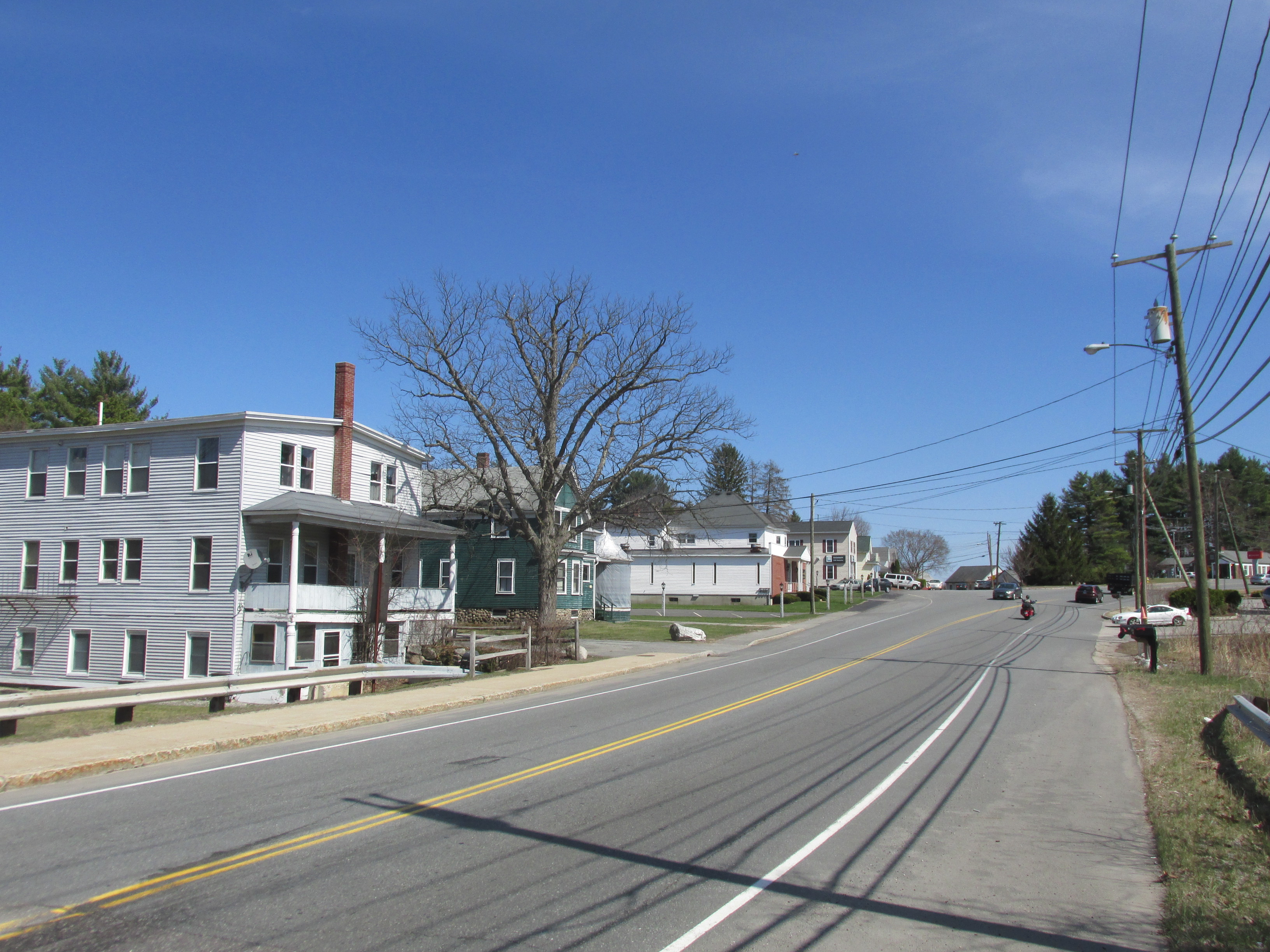
A section of the highway in Merrimack in 2014

The main road in Merrimack, the highway runs from the southeastern to northeastern portion of town, just east of the Everett Turnpike. It continues into Bedford, crossing to the west of the Everett Turnpike, and passing through the town's main commercial district, ending at the town's northern border with Manchester, where it becomes Second Street. Access between the D.W. Highway and the Turnpike:

- At Turnpike Exit 7 via the Henri Burque Highway to Concord Street.
- At Turnpike Exit 10 (Industrial Drive)
- At Turnpike Exit 11 (Continental Boulevard)
- At Turnpike Exit 12 (Bedford Road)
- At New Hampshire Route 101 in Bedford, just west of Interstate 293 Exit 3 (where it merges with the Everett Turnpike)

=== North of Manchester into Hooksett ===
Beginning at Webster Street near Livingston Park in north Manchester, heading past Interstate 93, this D.W. Highway is the main commercial thoroughfare in Hooksett, continuing northbound east of the Merrimack River to the town boundary with Allenstown, where US 3 becomes Allenstown Road.

=== Pittsburg ===
In Pittsburg, the highway passes, in order proceeding northbound, to the north of Lake Francis, to the east of Back Lake, to the west of both the First Connecticut Lake and Second Connecticut Lake, and to the east of the Third Connecticut Lake. The highway reaches its northern terminus at the border with Canada, where the Pittsburg–Chartierville Border Crossing is located. Travel northward from that point is via Quebec Route 257.

The section of the highway from the Second Connecticut Lake to the Canadian border was constructed to provide access to the border station, which first opened on July 30, 1939. The 10 miles (16 km) of roadway, originally unpaved, was built by the Civilian Conservation Corps (CCC). This northernmost section of the highway was formally dedicated on September 24, 1939. A sign noting that date, along with the name of the road's key proponent, local politician George D. Roberts, can be seen along the road approximately 200 yards (180 m) south of the border.
