= List of crossings of the Merrimack River =

This is a list of bridges and other crossings of the Merrimack River from its mouth in the Gulf of Maine at Newburyport, Massachusetts, upstream to its source at the merger of two rivers in Franklin, New Hampshire. Some pedestrian bridges and abandoned bridges are also listed.

River mouth
River source

== Crossings ==
Crossing	Carries	Location	Built	Coordinates	References
=== Massachusetts ===
Gillis Memorial Bridge	US 1 / Route 1A	Newburyport and Salisbury		42°48′57.89″N 70°52′24.29″W	
Newburyport Railroad Bridge	Newburyport Railroad	Newburyport and Salisbury		42°48′57.40″N 70°52′22.27″W	
Chain Bridge	Spofford Street (south bank to Deer Island)	Newburyport and Amesbury		42°50′1.19″N 70°54′24.53″W	
Derek S. Hines Memorial Bridge	Spofford Street (north bank to Deer Island)	Newburyport and Amesbury		42°50′7.53″N 70°54′26.97″W	
John Greenleaf Whittier Bridge	I-95	Newburyport and Amesbury	2019 (Replaces bridge built in 1951)	42°50′4.12″N 70°54′42.24″W	
Rocks Village Bridge	East Main Street	Haverhill and West Newbury		42°48′38.54″N 70°59′59.69″W	
Bates Bridge	Groveland Street	Haverhill and Groveland		42°45′49.88″N 71°2′2.92″W	
Basiliere Bridge	Route 125 (Main Street / South Main Street)	Haverhill		42°46′25.43″N 71°4′34.46″W	
	MBTA Commuter Rail: Haverhill Line	Haverhill		42.77099°N 71.08621°W	
Joseph C. Comeau Bridge	Railroad Avenue	Haverhill		42°46′14.08″N 71°5′13.03″W	
Antonio Franciosa Memorial Bridge	I-495	Haverhill		42°45′15.98″N 71°7′38.37″W	
O'Reilly Memorial Bridge	I-495	Lawrence and North Andover		42°42′23.93″N 71°8′18.78″W	
Duck Bridge	South Union Street	Lawrence		42°42′15.51″N 71°9′12.14″W	
Joseph W. Casey Bridge	Parker Street	Lawrence		42°42′12.77″N 71°9′37.34″W	
E.F. O'Leary Bridge	Route 28 (Broadway)	Lawrence		42°42′4.32″N 71°9′55.93″W	
Merrimack-Methuen Bridge	I-93	Lawrence	Methuen and Andover	42°42′1.82″N 71°12′35.27″W	
Hunts Falls Bridge	Route 38	Lowell	1959	42°38′48.76″N 71°17′57.39″W	
John E. Cox Memorial Bridge	Bridge Street	Lowell	1937 (Crossing dates to 1830s)	42°38′53.30″N 71°18′18.55″W	
Ouellette Memorial Bridge	Aiken Street / Aiken Avenue	Lowell	1883	42°39′17.01″N 71°18′55.51″W	
Richard P. Howe Bridge	University Avenue	Lowell	2013	42°39′5.76″N 71°19′29.14″W	
O'Donnell Bridge	School Street / Mammoth Rd	Lowell	2005 (Rebuilt from a bridge built in 1917, crossing dates to 1792)	42°38′58.36″N 71°19′49.98″W	
Rourke Bridge	Wood Street	Lowell	1983	42°38′18.58″N 71°21′24.31″W	The bridge is a "temporary" structure, but it might be replaced by a permanent structure soon.
Tyngsborough Bridge	Route 3A / Route 113	Tyngsborough	1932, Rebuilt 1975	42°40′33.66″N 71°25′16.33″W	
=== New Hampshire ===
Sagamore Bridge	Circumferential Highway	Nashua and Hudson	1973 (twinned in 2000)	42°43′27″N 71°26′17″W	
WN&R / B&M RR Bridge		Nashua and Hudson	1847	42°45′29″N 71°44′26″W	WN&R Railroad - Abutments remain
Taylor Falls Bridge	NH 111	Nashua and Hudson	1970 (Taylor Falls/eastbound span) & 1973 (Veterans Memorial/westbound span)	42°45′48″N 71°26′37″W	
Pearl Harbor Memorial Bridge	Manchester Airport Access Road (Raymond Wieczorek Drive)	Bedford and Manchester	2011	42°54′48″N 71°27′11″W	
Queen City Bridge	US 3	Manchester	1923	42°58′27″N 71°28′19″W	
Granite Street Bridge		Manchester	1981	42°59′7″N 71°28′11″W	
Notre Dame Bridge		Manchester	1988 (twinned in 1990)	42°59′39″N 71°28′10″W	
Amoskeag Memorial Bridge		Manchester	1970	43°0′13″N 71°28′11″W	
Main Street Bridge		Hooksett	1976	43°5′44″N 71°27′52″W	
Korea Veterans Memorial Bridge	US 3	Concord	1998	43°11′35″N 71°31′26″W	
World War II Veterans Memorial Bridge	NH 9	Concord	1966	43°12′32″N 71°31′50″W	
Vietnam & Gulf War Veterans Memorial Bridge	I-393 / US 4 / US 202	Concord	1978	43°13′10″N 71°31′23″W	
Sewalls Falls Road Bridge		Concord	1915	43°16′16″N 71°33′53″W	
New Hampshire Veterans Memorial Bridge	US 4	Penacook	2005	43°17′24″N 71°35′15.43″W	
Boscawen-Canterbury Bridge	Boscawen and Canterbury		1907	43°19′3.32″N 71°37′5″W	Bridge removed in 2014

River source at confluence of the Pemigewasset and Winnipesaukee rivers in Franklin, New Hampshire, at 43°26′12″N 71°38′54″W.

River source
- An italicized entry in the "name" column means that the real name is missing.
