= The Mall of New Hampshire =

Shopping mall in Manchester, New Hampshire, United States

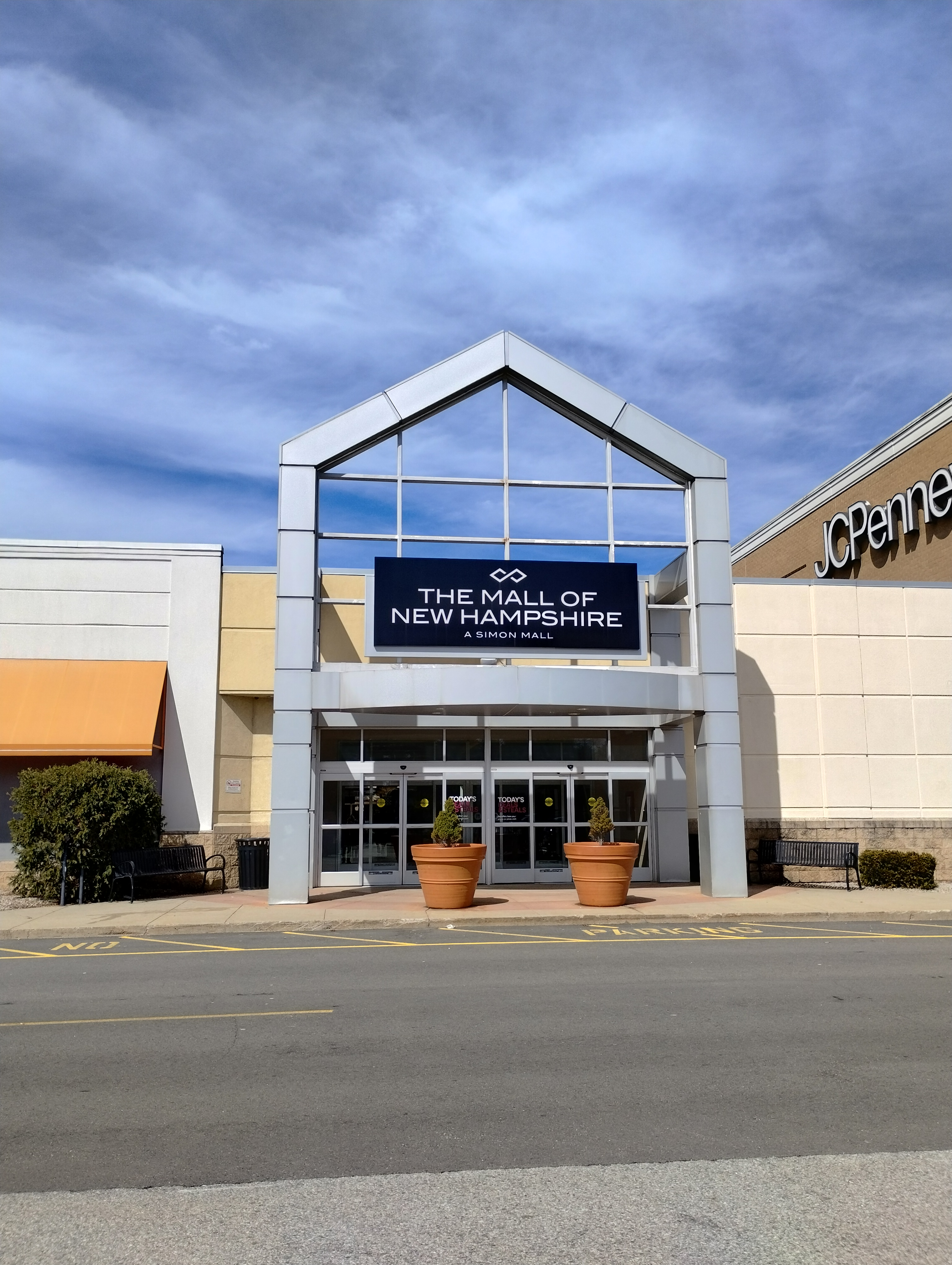
- An entrance to The Mall of New Hampshire, March 2025
- Location: Manchester, New Hampshire, United States
- Coordinates: 42°57′22″N 71°25′58″W
- Address: 1500 South Willow Street
- Opened: August 1977
- Manager: Simon Property Group
- Owner: Simon Property Group (56.4%); CPP Investment Board (44.0%)
- Num. of stores: 125
- Num. of anchor tenants: 6
- Floor area: 798,881 square feet (74,218.5 m^{2})
- Floors: 1 (2 in Macy's and JCPenney)
- Website: Mall of New Hampshire

The Mall of New Hampshire is a shopping mall located in the Lower South Willow neighborhood of Manchester, New Hampshire. Its major anchoring stores are Macy's, Old Navy, JCPenney, Dick's Sporting Goods, Best Buy, and Dave & Buster's. The mall has 125 stores as well as a large food court and is 798,881 square feet (74,218.5 m^{2}), making it the third largest mall in New Hampshire after the Mall at Rockingham Park in Salem, and the Pheasant Lane Mall in Nashua, which opened in 1991 and 1986, respectively. This was the first large-scale shopping mall in New Hampshire; initial construction of the mall was completed in August 1977, though it has since been dramatically expanded.

The Mall of New Hampshire is managed by Simon Property Group, which owns 56.4 percent of it. The mall is also 44 percent owned by the CPP Investment Board, which manages the Canada Pension Plan national pension system.

The mall is located just off the South Willow Street exit (Exit 1) of Interstate 293, and has convenient access from the entire Golden Triangle of New Hampshire and portions of northeastern Massachusetts. Because of its location in south-central New Hampshire, the mall, along with other area malls draw a significant portion of its customer base from Massachusetts citizens, as well as residents of neighboring Maine and Vermont, wishing to take advantage of New Hampshire's lack of sales tax.

== History ==
The Mall of New Hampshire opened in August 1977 with Sears, Filene's, and Lechmere as anchors.

The mall underwent a huge expansion and remodeling from late 1996 to early 1998. Sears was expanded in 1997 and remodeled. The original 60,000-square-foot (5,600 m^{2}) Filene's was relocated to a newly built 160,000-square-foot (15,000 m^{2}) store in a newer wing of the mall in early 1997. The original Filene's was demolished and rebuilt into a 2-level JCPenney in early 1998. The Lechmere closed in 1997 and became in 1998 a Best Buy and a Kitchen ETC. The food court was renovated in early 1998 and changed to a 550-seat food court. In 2006, as a result of the Federated/May merger, all Filene's locations, including the one at the mall, were closed, followed by most of them, including the Mall of New Hampshire location changing over to Macy's.

In April 2013, JCPenney went under another big renovation on both the top and bottom levels of their store, adding in a Sephora to help ease customers from going to the locations down at the Mall at Rockingham Park and the Pheasant Lane Mall.

In 2015, Sears Holdings spun off 235 of its properties, including the Sears at Mall of New Hampshire, into Seritage Growth Properties.

On August 22, 2018, it was announced that Sears would be closing as part of a plan to 46 stores nationwide. The store closed in November 2018. On December 8, 2018, it was announced that Dick's Sporting Goods would be opening in half of the former Sears. The other half of the former Sears will become Dave & Buster's. Dick's Sporting Goods opened on October 30, 2019, and Dave & Buster's was originally scheduled to open on March 30, 2020, however it was delayed to August 24, 2020 due to the COVID-19 pandemic. The former Sears Auto Center was demolished for more parking spaces.
