= New Hampshire Route 3A =

Highway in New Hampshire

New Hampshire Route 3A
- Route 3A highlighted in blue

Route information
- Auxiliary route of US 3
- Maintained by NHDOT

Southern segment
- Length: 39.412 mi (63.427 km)
- South end: Route 3A at the Massachusetts state line
- Major intersections: I-293 / NH 101 in Manchester; I-293 / Everett Turnpike / US 3 / NH 114A in Manchester; I-89 in Bow
- North end: US 3 in Concord

Northern segment
- Length: 31.015 mi (49.914 km)
- South end: US 3 / NH 11 / NH 127 in Franklin
- Major intersections: US 3 / NH 25 in Plymouth
- North end: I-93 in Plymouth

Location
- Country: United States
- State: New Hampshire
- Counties: Hillsborough, Merrimack, Grafton

Highway system
- New Hampshire Highway System; Interstate; US; State; Turnpikes
← US 3	→ US 4
← Route 5	N.E.	→ Route 7

Old style Route 3A shield, still seen widely throughout the state

New Hampshire Route 3A is a designation held by two separate state highways in New Hampshire. The two segments, although not directly connected, are linked by U.S. Route 3, from which they derive their route number.

== Route description ==
=== Southern segment ===
The southern terminus of the 39.40-mile-long (63.41 km) southern segment is at the Massachusetts state line in Hudson, where it continues south as Massachusetts Route 3A. The northern terminus is in the city of Concord at US 3. This segment of NH 3A follows the Merrimack River for its entire length. The route begins in Hudson at the Massachusetts line and shortly intersects the eastern end of the Nashua Circumferential Highway, which provides access to US 3 and the F.E. Everett Turnpike. NH 3A passes through Hudson Village, the historic center of town, where it intersects with NH 111 just across the river from downtown Nashua. NH 102 begins at this intersection and is cosigned with NH 3A for its first mile, before 3A splits to the north west, while 102 continues on towards Londonderry. NH 3A continues along the eastern bank of the river, through Litchfield and into the city of Manchester, where it crosses under I-293/NH 101 and follows a short surface alignment in the southwest section of town. NH 3A intersects with US 3 and is actually cosigned with it (in a wrong-way concurrency) on Queen City Avenue across the river, where the two routes intersect NH 114A at its eastern terminus. At this point, NH 3A leaves US 3 and merges onto I-293 northbound (which also carries the Everett Turnpike) at exit 4. NH 3A is concurrent with I-293 for 3 miles (5 km), departing at exit 7 and crossing into Hooksett. The highway immediately interchanges with I-93 (which it parallels for the remainder of its length) near the northern terminus of I-293, and continues north (now paralleling on the west side of the river). Hackett Hill Road provides another access point to I-93, while nearby Main Street connects to US 3/NH 28 across the river. NH 3A enters Bow and meets the southern end of the I-89 freeway before crossing into the city limits of Concord. The highway interchanges with I-93 one last time before ending at US 3 just south of downtown Concord.

=== Northern segment ===
The southern terminus of the 30.93-mile-long (49.78 km) northern segment is in the city of Franklin at US 3, NH 11, and NH 127. Where US 3 takes a more easterly route from here, NH 3A continues due north, following the western bank of the Pemigewasset River along North Main Street. North of Franklin, it enters the town of Hill, continuing to follow the Pemigewasset, passing through the William H. Thomas State Forest on the way to the town of Bristol. It forms the main commercial thoroughfare through Bristol, with a brief concurrency with NH 104 in the center of town, following first South Main Street, then Pleasant Street, and finally Lake Street. At Bristol, 3A leaves the Pemigewasset, which turns east here, and continues north into Bridgewater and the southern shores of Newfound Lake. Following the Mayhew Turnpike along the eastern side of Newfound Lake through Bridgewater, 3A continues through rural areas on the eastern side of Hebron and the western side of Plymouth. In Plymouth, the route joins with NH 25 and heads due east to rejoin US 3 at an interchange with Interstate 93, US 3 and NH 25, which is the northern terminus of this segment.

== History ==

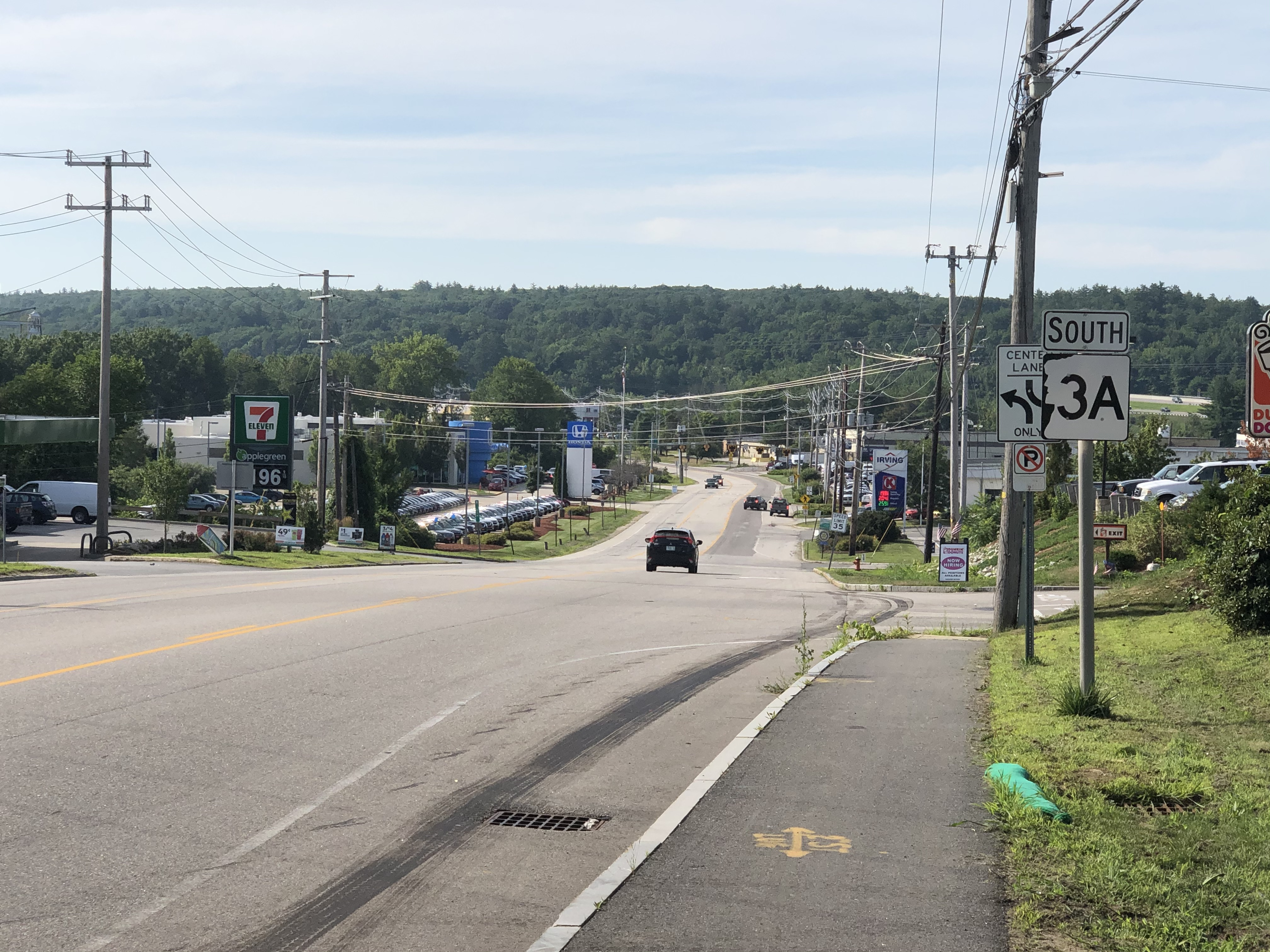
NH 3A in the town of Bow

From 1922 to 1926, Route 3A was part of the New England road marking system as New England Route 6A (NE-6A). In 1926, all roads designated as NE-6A were changed to New Hampshire Route 3A and Massachusetts Route 3A to accommodate the change of New England Route 6 to U.S. Route 3.

== Major intersections ==
=== Southern segment ===
County	Location	mi	km	Destinations	Notes
Hillsborough	Hudson	0.000	0.000	Route 3A south (Frost Road) – Tyngsborough	Continuation into Massachusetts
Hillsborough	Hudson	2.170	3.492	To US 3 / Everett Turnpike – Boston, South Nashua	Access via Circumferential Highway
Hillsborough	Hudson	5.036	8.105	NH 111 (Ferry Street) – Nashua NH 102 begins	Western terminus of NH 102
Hillsborough	Hudson	6.044	9.727	NH 102 east (Derry Road) – Derry	Northern end of NH 102 concurrency
Hillsborough	Manchester	16.82	27.07	To US 3 / Everett Turnpike / Raymond Wieczorek Drive – Manchester Airport, Merrimack, Bedford	Access via Roundstone Drive
Hillsborough	Manchester	19.214– 19.314	30.922– 31.083	I-293 / NH 101 – Salem, Concord, Portsmouth, Bedford, Nashua	Exit 2 on I-293
Hillsborough	Manchester	21.257	34.210	US 3 north (Elm Street)	Southern end of US 3 concurrency
Hillsborough	Manchester	21.900– 21.918	35.245– 35.274	I-293 south / Everett Turnpike south / US 3 south (Second Street) / NH 114A – Boston	Northern end of US 3 concurrency; southern end of I-293 / Turnpike concurrency; exit 4 on I-293; eastern terminus of NH 114A
Hillsborough	Manchester	23.290	37.482	Granite Street – West Manchester	Exit 5 on I-293
Hillsborough	Manchester	24.472	39.384	Amoskeag Street / Goffstown Road	Exit 6 on I-293
Hillsborough	Manchester	24.908	40.086	I-293 north / Everett Turnpike north	Exit 7 on I-293; northern end of I-293 / Turnpike concurrency; northbound exit and southbound entrance
Merrimack	Hooksett	27.298– 27.673	43.932– 44.535	I-93 – Salem, Boston, Concord, Plymouth	Exit 10 on I-93
Merrimack	Hooksett	30.867	49.676	To I-93 / Everett Turnpike – Concord, Manchester	Access via Hackett Hill Road
Merrimack	Bow	37.601	60.513	I-89 north – Bow, Lebanon	Southern terminus of I-89
Merrimack	Concord	38.003– 38.340	61.160– 61.702	I-93 (Everett Turnpike) to I-89 north – Plymouth, Littleton, Manchester, Lebanon (Note: The Everett Turnpike is unsigned along I-93 from the I-293 interchange to its northern terminus in Concord at exit 14.)	Exit 12 on I-93
Merrimack	Concord	39.412	63.427	US 3 (Water Street / South Main Street) to US 202 / NH 9	Northern terminus
1.000 mi = 1.609 km; 1.000 km = 0.621 mi: Concurrency terminus; Incomplete access

=== Northern segment ===
County	Location	mi	km	Destinations	Notes
Merrimack	Franklin	0.000	0.000	US 3 (South Main Street) / NH 11 east (Central Street) / NH 127 – Downtown Franklin, Tilton, Laconia, Salisbury, Concord	Southern terminus; southern end of NH 11 concurrency
Merrimack	Franklin	1.020	1.642	NH 11 west (Webster Lake Road) – Andover	Northern end of NH 11 concurrency
Grafton	Bristol	13.109	21.097	NH 104 east (Summer Street) to I-93 – New Hampton	Southern end of NH 104 concurrency
Grafton	Bristol	13.305	21.412	NH 104 west (Pleasant Street) – Danbury	Northern end of NH 104 concurrency
Grafton	Plymouth	27.009	43.467	NH 25 west – Rumney, Woodsville	Southern end of NH 25 concurrency
Grafton	Plymouth	30.547	49.161	US 3 / NH 25 east (Main Street) – Plymouth, Campton	Interchange; northern end of NH 25 concurrency
Grafton	Plymouth	31.015	49.914	I-93 (Styles Bridges Highway) – Campton, Littleton, Ashland, Concord	Northern terminus; exit 26 on I-93
1.000 mi = 1.609 km; 1.000 km = 0.621 mi: Concurrency terminus

== See also ==
- New Hampshire Route 132, once designated New Hampshire Route 3B
