= Everett Turnpike =

Toll road in New Hampshire

Everett Turnpike
- Central New Hampshire Turnpike
- Everett Turnpike highlighted in red

Route information
- Maintained by NHDOT Bureau of Turnpikes
- Length: 39.867 mi (64.160 km)
- Existed: c. 1955–present
- Component highways: US 3 from Massachusetts state line to Nashua; I-293 from Manchester to Hooksett; I-93 from Hooksett to Concord

Major junctions
- South end: US 3 at the Massachusetts state line
- US 3 / Raymond Wieczorek Drive in Bedford; I-293 / NH 101 / US 3 in Bedford; I-93 in Hooksett; I-89 in Bow
- North end: I-93 / NH 9 in Concord

Location
- Country: United States
- State: New Hampshire
- Counties: Hillsborough, Merrimack

Highway system
- New Hampshire Highway System; Interstate; US; State; Turnpikes

The Frederick E. Everett Turnpike, also called the Central New Hampshire Turnpike, is a controlled-access toll road in the U.S. state of New Hampshire, running 44 miles (71 km) from the Massachusetts border at Nashua north to Concord. The Everett Turnpike is named for Frederick Elwin Everett, the first commissioner of the New Hampshire Department of Transportation.

The turnpike is part of the New Hampshire Turnpike System, and is operated by the New Hampshire Department of Transportation's Bureau of Turnpikes. There are two tolled sections, a southern one in Bedford and a northern tolled section in Hooksett; the remainder of the turnpike is toll-free. Each of the tolled segments costs a maximum of $1.00 for passenger cars passing through the mainline tollbooths, with lower rates charged on the ramp tolls for traveling shorter distances. A 30% discount is also offered for NH E-ZPass account holders only.

Built prior to the Interstate Highway System, the route was completed in the mid-1950s as a single highway from Nashua to Concord. Today, the route is overlaid with portions of several other routes: U.S. Route 3 from the Massachusetts border to New Hampshire Route 101A in Nashua, unnumbered from there until New Hampshire Route 101 in Bedford, I-293 from there until I-93 in Hooksett, and I-93 from Hooksett to Concord. There is also a short segment concurrent with New Hampshire Route 3A in Manchester.

== Route description ==
Much of the turnpike's length has been overlapped by other numbered routes. Portions of the road are shared with US-3, I-93, and I-293. The southern portion of the turnpike, in Nashua, is posted as US-3, serving as an extension of the US-3 freeway (Northwest Expressway) from Burlington, Massachusetts. North of Exit 7 in Nashua, the turnpike runs by itself and has no number, but parallels US-3, which is a toll-free local road variously known as Concord Street (within the city of Nashua) and the Daniel Webster Highway (within Merrimack and Bedford). Approaching Bedford in the Manchester area, the turnpike is joined by I-293 which, splits off from a concurrency with NH-101. At Exit 4 (exits are numbered for I-293 on this stretch), NH-3A joins the freeway, and the concurrency passes through Manchester, near the downtown area of the city. Upon passing Manchester, Route 3A splits off at Exit 7, I-293's last northbound exit. The freeway passes into Hooksett, and I-293 ends at an interchange with I-93. The Everett Turnpike ceases to be signed at this interchange, but joins I-93 northbound and continues towards Concord, interchanging with the southern terminus of I-89 along the way. No definitive northern terminus for the turnpike exists as far as signage is concerned. This endpoint was originally at a traffic circle next to downtown Concord that has since been replaced by Exit 14 with NH-9.

There are two mainline toll plazas on the turnpike, in Bedford and Hooksett, that each charge $1.00 for cash and out of state E-ZPass users. The Bedford mainline toll plaza, located between Exit 13 and I-293, replaced the Merrimack toll plaza (formerly located at what is now Exit 11) on January 4, 1989. Ramp tolls also exist at I-93 Exit 11 at the mainline toll plaza in Hooksett. E-ZPass readers were installed in all toll locations in 2005, and the state currently offers a 30% discount for using an NHDOT issued E-ZPass. Major rest areas combined with state-run liquor stores are located on either side of the highway in Hooksett just north of the mainline toll plaza on I-93. On July 18, 2014, the Exit 12 ramp tolls in Merrimack were removed, and on January 1, 2020, the Merrimack Exit 11 ramp tolls were removed. Toll collection at Exit 10 in Merrimack ended on December 31, 2021.

The proposed (but mostly unbuilt) Circumferential Highway around the east side of Nashua is defined as part of the turnpike. Henri A. Burque Highway, the surface road that US-3 uses to get between exit 7 of the turnpike and the Daniel Webster Highway in northern Nashua, is also part of it.

== Signage ==
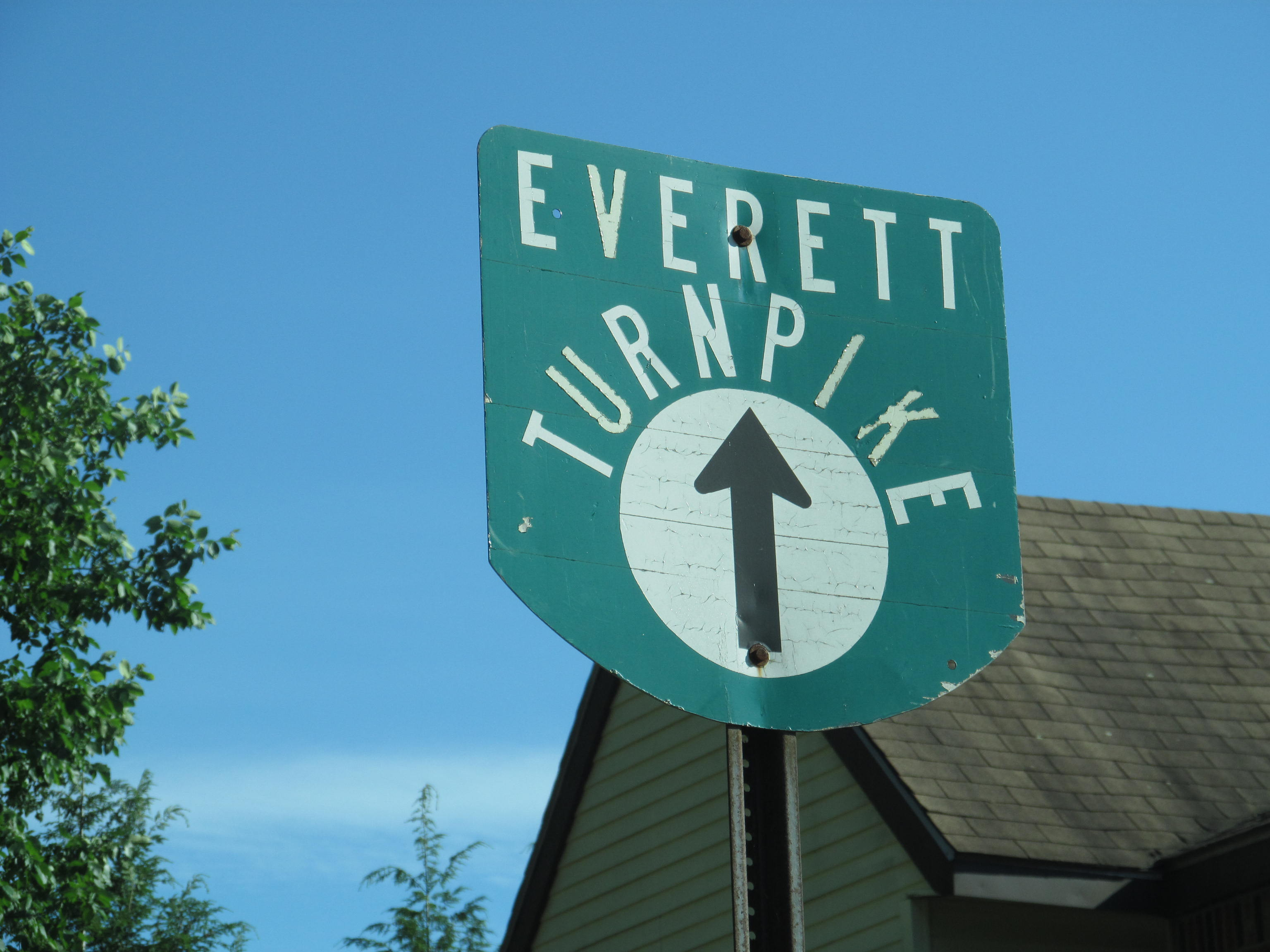
Road sign showing access to the Everett Turnpike

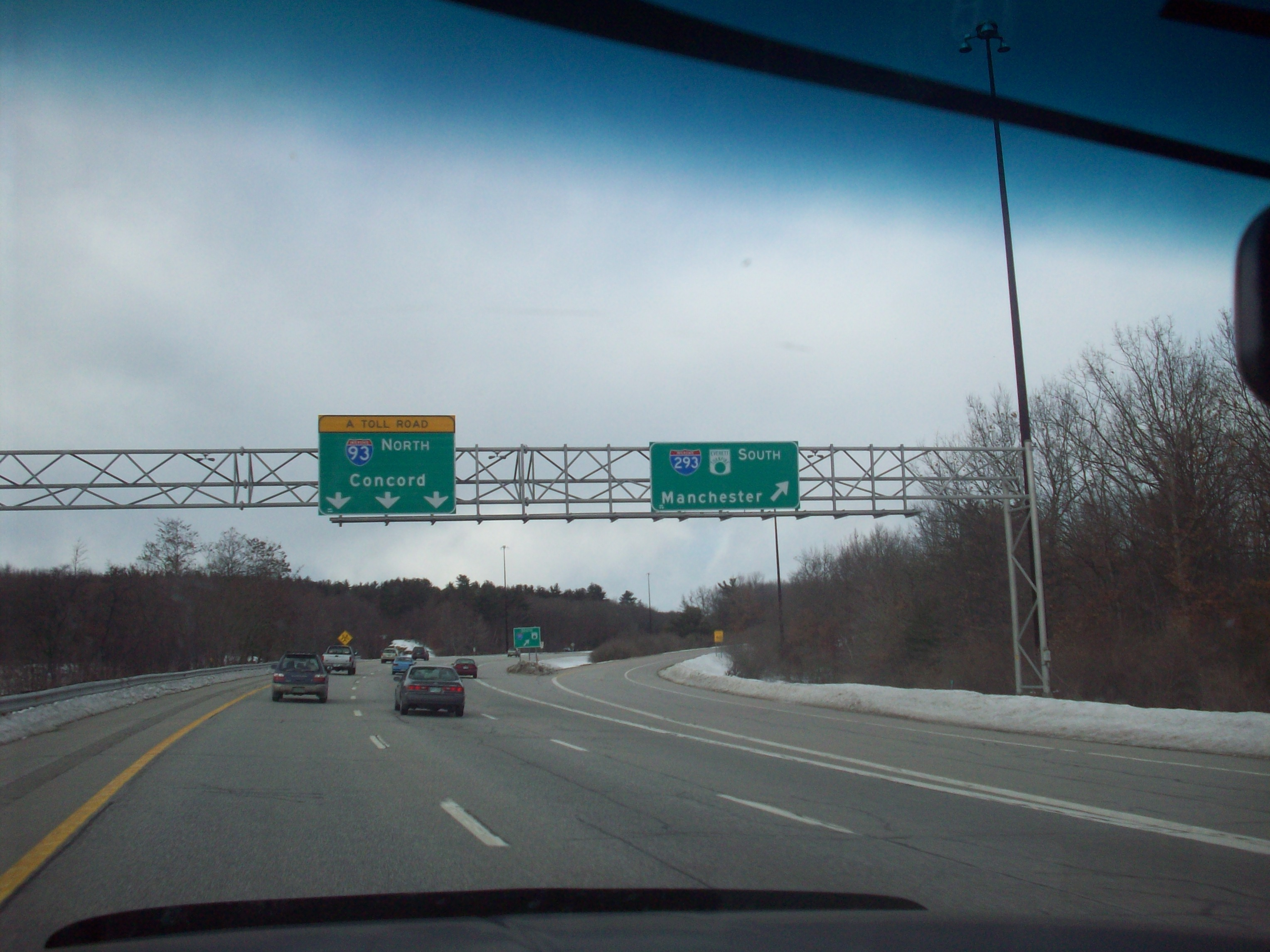
The northern end of I-293 as viewed from I-93 northbound. The Everett Turnpike joins I-93 North at this interchange, but no sign indicates this.

Signs for the Everett Turnpike consist of a rectangle with a rounded bottom, a green circle, and green text that says "Everett Turnpike" above the circle, with the word "Turnpike" curved along the top edge of the circle; this signage is similar in design to that for other New Hampshire turnpikes. For the US 3 segment in Nashua, there is an Everett Turnpike sign in Massachusetts just south of the border northbound alongside the US 3 shield on an overhead sign, and several others along overhead signs through Nashua. Mile markers also contain the Everett Turnpike shield in Nashua, and combined US 3 and Everett Turnpike shields are posted along the side of the road on stand-alone posts, though most on-ramp signage only indicates US 3.

Signs for the turnpike are most prominent on the Merrimack-Bedford segment, which lacks any concurrent US or Interstate route. Along this section, the Everett Turnpike shield appears on on-ramp direction signs, along the side of the highway on signposts, and on overhead reassurance signs.

Along the I-293 segment in Manchester, signage is similar to the Nashua US 3 section, though mile markers have the I-293 shield instead of the Everett Turnpike shield.

Though the turnpike continues north to Concord, it is not signed north of the I-293 merge in Hooksett. On I-93 North, the exit for I-293 is signed as I-293/Everett Turnpike South, while the mainline is signed as "I-93 North (a toll road)". On I-293 North, Everett Turnpike signs stop at the merge, with I-93 North signed by itself. There is no indication of the northern terminus on I-93 in either direction. Southbound, the first emergence of turnpike signage is after the exit onto I-293. The sole mention of the Everett Turnpike north of the I-293 merge is on New Hampshire Route 3A at the intersection with Hackett Hill Road leading to exit 11 in Hooksett. A sign with the Turnpike and I-93 shields notes the highway as leading north to Concord and south to Manchester. North of Exit 11, there are no turnpike signs on intersecting highways, including I-89.

There are turnpike mile markers only from the Massachusetts state line to the interchange with I-293 and Route 101. North of there, the mile markers and sequential exit numbers relate to the concurrent Interstate highways.

== History ==
The highway first opened in 1955, from the Daniel Webster Highway (modern exit 3) in South Nashua to Queen City Avenue (modern I-293 Exit 4) in Manchester, with a single exit between the termini at NH 101A/Amherst Street in Nashua (modern exit 7). There was one toll booth at Thornton's Ferry in Merrimack. In 1957, a second portion was opened from Queen City Avenue north to Manchester Street (US 3) in Concord (modern I-93 exit 13). The second segment had a toll booth installed at Hooksett. In 1958, the section from Hooksett northwards was incorporated into I-93. Two additional exits (modern exits 5 and 6) were added in 1960 and one more (modern exit 4) in 1964. Finally, the last segment of the route, an extension from the then-southern terminus at Daniel Webster Highway to the Massachusetts border to meet the Northwest Expressway, was completed in 1966.

Little additional work was done on the turnpike for the next 12 years. In 1978, the turnpike was widened from four lanes to six between the Hooksett tolls and I-89 in Bow. In 1986, a new exit was opened at Somerset Parkway in Nashua, exit 8 (formerly exit 7W), providing a bypass of the congested exit 7 interchange, which carried access to Amherst Street and Henri Burque Highway (US 3). In 1990 and 1993, two new exits were opened in Merrimack, exit 10 (Industrial Drive) and exit 11 (Continental Boulevard), along with the relocation of the mainline toll booth from Merrimack to Bedford. In the late 1990s, work began on the southern segment of the route through Nashua from the Massachusetts border to exit 8 (Somerset Parkway) as it was widened to six lanes, and the entire route south of Daniel Webster Highway (exit 3) was rebuilt, including a new exit (exit 1A-2) to connect to the Sagamore Bridge to Hudson, a rebuild of exit 1 (Spit Brook Road), and a set of collector distributor lanes. The project was completed in 2002.

In the mid 2000s, I-293 exit 5 was rebuilt, adding additional ramps and widening the northbound side to three lanes from just south of exit 5 to exit 7 (NH 3A). Finally, in 2011, Raymond Wieczorek Drive (exit 13), a connector from the Everett Turnpike from just south of the I-293 merge to Manchester–Boston Regional Airport, was built.

== Exit list ==
County	Location	mi	km	Old exit	New exit	Destinations	Notes
Hillsborough	Nashua	0.00	0.00			US 3 south (Northwest Expressway)	Continuation into Massachusetts; southern end of US 3 concurrency
Hillsborough	Nashua	0.50	0.80		1	Spit Brook Road – South Nashua	
Hillsborough	Nashua	1.49	2.40		2	To NH 3A / Daniel Webster Highway – Hudson	Access via Circumferential Highway; signed as exit 1A from northbound collector–distributor lane
Hillsborough	Nashua	2.59	4.17	1	3	Daniel Webster Highway – South Nashua	Southbound left exit and northbound entrance
Hillsborough	Nashua	3.18	5.12		4	East Dunstable Road	
Hillsborough	Nashua	4.69	7.55	2	5	NH 111 / NH 111A west – Nashua, Hudson, Pepperell, MA	Signed as exits 5E (east) and 5W (west); eastern terminus of NH 111A
Hillsborough	Nashua	5.13	8.26	5E-A	5A	Simon Street	Northbound exit only
Hillsborough	Nashua	6.22	10.01		6	NH 130 (Broad Street) – Hollis	
Hillsborough	Nashua	6.74	10.85		7	US 3 north / NH 101A – Nashua Downtown, Amherst, Milford	Signed as exits 7E (north/east) and 7W (west); northern end of US 3 concurrency
Hillsborough	Nashua	7.66	12.33	7W	8	To NH 101A west – Amherst, Milford	Access via Somerset Parkway
Hillsborough	Merrimack	9.83	15.82		10	Industrial Drive to US 3	Formerly tolled northbound exit and southbound entrance
Hillsborough	Merrimack	11.10	17.86	8	11	US 3 – Merrimack	Formerly tolled northbound exit and southbound entrance; access via Greeley Street
Hillsborough	Merrimack	14.94	24.04		12	US 3 / Bedford Road	Northbound exit and southbound entrance; formerly tolled
Hillsborough	Bedford	17.1	27.5		13	US 3 (South River Road) / Raymond Wieczorek Drive east – Manchester–Boston Regional Airport	Western terminus of Raymond Wieczorek Drive; interchange opened November 10, 2011
Hillsborough	Bedford	17.2	27.7	Bedford Toll Plaza			
Hillsborough	Bedford	19.39	31.21	10	3	I-293 south / NH 101 / US 3 to NH 114 – Portsmouth, Exeter, Bedford, Milford	No direct northbound access to US 3; southern end of I-293 concurrency; exit number not signed
Hillsborough	Manchester	21.22	34.15	6	4	US 3 (Second Street / Queen City Avenue) / NH 3A south / NH 114A – Manchester	Southern end of NH 3A concurrency
Hillsborough	Manchester	21.96	35.34		5	Granite Street – West Manchester	
Hillsborough	Manchester	23.27	37.45	7	6	Amoskeag Street / Goffstown Road	
Hillsborough	Manchester	24.25	39.03		7	NH 3A north – Hooksett	Northbound exit and southbound entrance; northern end of NH 3A concurrency
Merrimack	Hooksett	27.18	43.74		—	I-93 south – Salem, Boston I-293 ends	Southern end of I-93 concurrency; northern terminus of I-293; last northbound exit before toll
Merrimack	Hooksett	29.15– 30.07	46.91– 48.39	8	11	To NH 3A – Hooksett	Access via Hackett Hill Road
Merrimack	Hooksett	29.15– 30.07	46.91– 48.39			Hooksett Toll Plaza	
Merrimack	Bow	36.24	58.32		—	I-89 north – Lebanon, White River Junction, VT	Southern terminus of I-89; last southbound exit before toll
Merrimack	Concord	36.91	59.40		12	NH 3A (South Main Street) to I-89 north – Bow Junction	Signed as exits 12N (north) and 12S (south); I-89 not signed southbound
Merrimack	Concord	38.08	61.28		13	US 3 (Manchester Street) – Downtown Concord	
Merrimack	Concord	39.20	63.09		14	NH 9 (Loudon Road) – State Offices	
Merrimack	Concord	39.20	63.09			I-93 north – Plymouth	Continuation north; northern end of I-93 concurrency
1.000 mi = 1.609 km; 1.000 km = 0.621 mi: Concurrency terminus; Incomplete access; Tolled

== See also ==
- New Hampshire Highway System
