= New Hampshire Highway System =

Highway system in United States

- Standard highway markers for Interstate 93, U.S. Route 3, New Hampshire Route 16, and the Everett Turnpike

System information
- Length: 4,814 mi (7,747 km)
- Notes: NHDOT maintains 17,029 mi (27,406 km) of roads in total

Highway names
- Interstates: Interstate X (I-X)
- US Highways: U.S. Route n (US X or Route X)
- State: New Hampshire Route X (NH X or Route X)

System links
- New Hampshire Highway System; Interstate; US; State; Turnpikes

The New Hampshire Highway System is the public roads system of the U.S. state of New Hampshire containing approximately 17,029 miles (27,406 km) maintained by the New Hampshire Department of Transportation (NHDOT). All public roads in the state are called "highways", thus there is no technical distinction between a "road" or a "highway" in New Hampshire.

== Overview ==
The state maintains 4,814 miles (7,747 km) of roads, of which 2,567 miles (4,131 km) are numbered routes and 1,465 miles (2,358 km) are unnumbered roadways making up the state's secondary roadway system. The state has 557 miles (896 km) of primary highways, which it defines as highways that "connect population centers, other NHS routes within the state, and other NHS routes in the surrounding states: Vermont, Maine and Massachusetts." The remaining 12,215 miles (19,658 km) of roads are maintained typically by the towns and cities traversed by these roads.

Highways assigned a number by the NHDOT are officially known as "New Hampshire Route X", often abbreviated "NH Route X" or simply "NH X".

Many minor state highways are not assigned numbers, only local names.

- The longest highway in New Hampshire is its segment of US 3, which runs for 241.953 miles (389.386 km) in the Granite State.
- The longest state highway is NH 16, which runs for 154.771 miles (249.080 km).
- The shortest highway in New Hampshire is NH 10A, which runs for 0.548 miles (0.882 km).

=== Interstate Highways ===
A total of 224.2 miles (360.8 km) of roadway in New Hampshire are part of the Interstate Highway System.

- Three primary Interstates pass through New Hampshire: I-89, I-93, and I-95.
- Two secondary Interstates are located in New Hampshire, I-293 and I-393.

=== U.S. Numbered Highways ===
A total of 585.1 miles (941.6 km) of roadway in New Hampshire are designated as United States Numbered Highways.

- Four primary routes pass through New Hampshire: US 1, US 2, US 3 and US 4.
- Two spur routes pass through New Hampshire, US 202 and US 302.
- Three special routes are designated in New Hampshire:
  - US 1 Bypass, a bypass of US 1 in Portsmouth and Kittery, Maine.
  - US 3 Business, a business route of US 3 in Laconia which runs along parts of existing NH 11A and NH 107.
  - US 302 Business, an unsigned loop of US 302 and NH 16 in Bartlett that is completely concurrent with NH 16A.

=== Turnpike system ===
The NHDOT Bureau of Turnpikes is responsible for maintenance of the public toll roads in New Hampshire:

- The Frederick E. Everett Turnpike (also known as the Central Turnpike) runs from the Massachusetts state line in Nashua north to Concord. It is cosigned with US 3 in Nashua until Exit 7, then runs by itself north to Manchester, where it interchanges with I-293 and NH 101. The Everett Turnpike is cosigned with I-293 from the NH 101 interchange north to I-93 in Hooksett, then has an unsigned concurrency with I-93 to its northern terminus in Concord at Exit 14 (NH 9).
- The Eastern Turnpike is composed of the following two connecting turnpikes:
  - The Blue Star Turnpike (unsigned; also known as the New Hampshire Turnpike) runs 14.3 miles (23.0 km) from the Massachusetts border in Seabrook north to the Portsmouth Traffic Circle, where it connects with the southern end of the Spaulding Turnpike. The Blue Star Turnpike is signed solely as I-95 and comprises most of its length in New Hampshire.
  - The Spaulding Turnpike, which begins at an interchange with I-95 in Portsmouth and runs northward, paralleling the Maine state line, to Milton. Originally a standalone route, NH 16 is now overlapped with all but the southernmost 0.8 miles (1.3 km) of the Spaulding Turnpike. US 4 also runs along the southern section of the turnpike, between I-95 and exit 6.

=== National Highway System ===
782 miles (1,259 km) of state-maintained roads are a part of the National Highway System (NHS). Of the NHS roads in the state, 225 miles (362 km) are Interstate highways (35 miles (56 km) of which are also on the New Hampshire Turnpike System); 52 miles (84 km) are non-interstate turnpike highways; and 505 miles (813 km) are non-interstate and non-turnpike highways.

== Classification of state highways ==
New Hampshire RSA 229:5, "Classification", sets out the seven different classes of highways in the state:

- Class I – all portions of the turnpikes and the national system of interstate and defense highways, and all existing or proposed highways on the primary state highway system, excepting all portions of highways within the compact sections of the cities and towns listed in RSA 229:5, V., which aren't part of the state or national turnpike system or are defense highways
- Class II – all existing or proposed highways on the secondary state highway system, excepting all portions of such highways within the compact sections of the cities and towns listed in RSA 229:5, V.
- Class III – all recreational roads leading to, and within, state reservations designated by the General Court
- Class III-a – boating access highways from any existing highway to any public water in this state.
- Class IV – all highways within the compact sections of cities and towns listed in RSA 229:5, V., which are not Class I or II highways
- Class V – all other traveled highways which a town has the duty to maintain regularly and shall be known as town roads
- Class VI – all other existing public ways, including all highways discontinued as open highways and made subject to gates and bars, except Class III-a roads, and all highways which have not been maintained and repaired by the town for travel thereon for 5 or more successive years

Under RSA 229:5, V, the Commissioner of Transportation may establish compact sections (Note: Defined as: "...the territory within such city or town where the frontage on any highway, in the opinion of the commissioner of transportation, is mainly occupied by dwellings or buildings in which people live or business is conducted, throughout the year and not for a season only.") in the following cities and towns:

- Amherst
- Bedford
- Berlin
- Claremont
- Concord
- Derry
- Dover
- Durham
- Exeter
- Franklin
- Goffstown
- Hampton
- Hanover
- Hudson
- Keene
- Laconia
- Lebanon
- Londonderry
- Manchester
- Merrimack
- Milford
- Nashua
- Pelham
- Portsmouth
- Rochester
- Salem
- Somersworth

=== Routes crossing state lines ===
Two New Hampshire state routes cross state lines while retaining their designations and NHDOT maintenance:

- NH 113B, a loop of Maine State Route 113 unrelated to NH 113 (despite their relatively close proximity), runs within the towns of Chatham, New Hampshire and Stow, Maine.
- NH 153 crosses into the town of Parsonsfield, Maine for 1.1 miles (1.8 km) to go around Province Lake, then runs directly on the state border between Parsonsfield and Effingham, New Hampshire for another 0.8 miles (1.3 km) before returning to New Hampshire.

Maine State Route 113 crosses into and out of New Hampshire twice. It runs for 1.4 miles (2.3 km) within the town of Conway and for 4.6 miles (7.4 km) within the town of Chatham. SR 113 remains under MaineDOT maintenance along both of these stretches.

== Signage practices ==
=== State highways ===

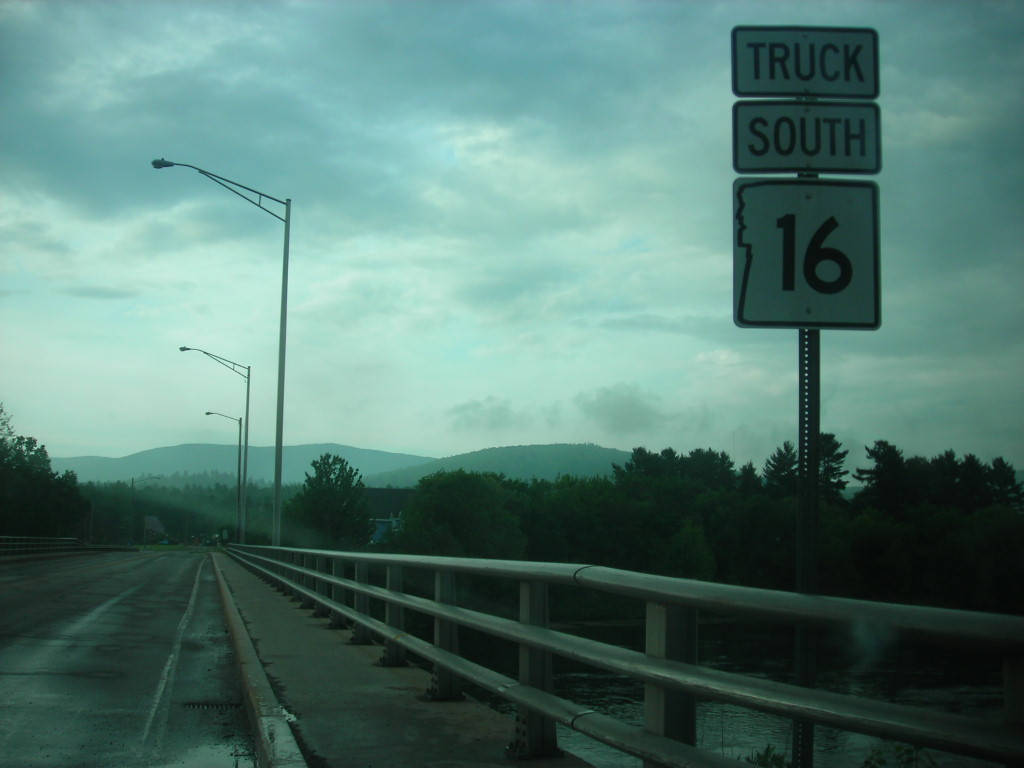
NH 16 truck route signage

State highways in New Hampshire are marked using square route shields depicting the Old Man of the Mountain. Unlike its neighboring states, New Hampshire does not use elongated shields for route markers, but uses condensed fonts for three-digit routes instead.

Alternates of two- and three- digit routes (e.g. NH 115A) are signed with the parent highway's number over the letter of the alternate. For multiple alternates of the same route, the state generally uses sequential letters. With the exception of the US 1 Bypass in Portsmouth, alternates of U.S. Highways are signed as state routes.

For example:

- Besides the US 1 Bypass, US 1 has two other alternates designated NH 1A and NH 1B.
- NH 11 has four alternates designated NH 11A, NH 11B, NH 11C and NH 11D.
- NH 25 has three alternates designated NH 25A, NH 25B and NH 25C.

NH 101E in Hampton is an exception. Despite being an implied alternate of NH 101, NH 101E has never connected to NH 101 or any of its current or former alternates.

Three instances of duplicated route numbers exist in New Hampshire:

- Two separate segments of highway are designated as NH 3A. They are separated by a 19.1-mile (30.7 km) section of US 3.
- US 4 and NH 4 are two separate highways which both run within the city limits of Dover. NH 4 was originally supposed to have been part of US 4, but is instead a southward extension of Maine State Route 4.
- Two separate loops of NH 16 are both designated NH 16A but located only 3.4 miles (5.5 km) apart.

New Hampshire has a few special state routes. Known examples are:

- NH 28 Bypass, marked with a standard shield including "BYPASS" over the numeral.
- NH 101 Business in the Raymond area, which is no longer signed.
- In the Berlin area, truck routes are marked for NH 16 and NH 110 with a "TRUCK" sign mounted over standard shields.

=== U.S. Numbered Highways ===

New Hampshire uses the standard U.S. Route shield, a six-point white shield over a black square background. New Hampshire contains parts of the four lowest-numbered primary US highways: US 1, US 2, US 3 and US 4. US 2 is the only primary US highway within New Hampshire with any spur routes in the state, of which two are present: US 202 and US 302. New Hampshire does not use elongated route shields for U.S Routes, except on the occasional guide sign from a freeway and on some newer signage. Condensed fonts are used instead.

- US 1 Bypass in Portsmouth is marked with a standard shield including "BYPASS" over the numeral.
- US 3 Business in Laconia uses separate banners and US 3 shields, but only a few exist. It is otherwise signed as either NH 11A or NH 107.
- US 302 Business in Bartlett is unsigned - the road is signed only as NH 16A.
- All other alternates of U.S. Highways are signed as state routes.

=== Interstate highways ===

New Hampshire uses standard-issue Interstate shields for its two-digit Interstate highways, of which there are three: I-89, I-93 and I-95.

Elongated shields were not initially used for auxiliary Interstates, but such shields have appeared on newer signage. New Hampshire no longer uses its state name on Interstate shields, but older signs with the state name do exist. New Hampshire contains the only two auxiliaries of I-93: I-293 and I-393. They are both completely overlapped by other routes.

=== Turnpikes ===

New Hampshire uses a special shield on the Spaulding Turnpike and the Everett Turnpike. Both contain the name of the turnpike over a colored circle, within a rectangular shield with an arced bottom edge. The Spaulding Turnpike uses a blue color, while the Everett Turnpike uses a green color. Older shields used inverted colors, with white text and circle inside of a colored background.

There is no shield for the Blue Star Turnpike, as it is only signed as I-95. However, when it was called the New Hampshire Turnpike it was signed with shields similar to those of the Spaulding and Everett turnpikes, blue in color and reading as "N.H. Turnpike".

=== Exit numbering ===
New Hampshire is one of the few states that still uses sequential exit numbering on its freeways, including all Interstate highways, the Turnpike routes, as well as the NH 101 freeway between Manchester and Hampton. Exits to Interstate Highways are not assigned numbers, with the exception of I-93's Exit 15E to I-393 in Concord, which existed as such before I-393 was designated, and retained its exit number.

There are a few sequential numbering anomalies:

- Exit 3 on I-293 (the interchange with NH 101 and the Everett Turnpike) is not signed.
- Exits 2 and 5 on the Spaulding Turnpike were eliminated as part of a reconstruction and widening project in the late 2010s.
- Exit 9 on the Everett Turnpike has never existed.
- Exit 10 on the Spaulding Turnpike has never existed - the number was intentionally skipped to allow for future construction of an additional interchange between Dover and Rochester.
- Exit 21 on I-93 has never existed.

=== Major junctions and route concurrencies ===
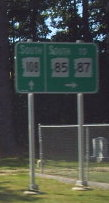
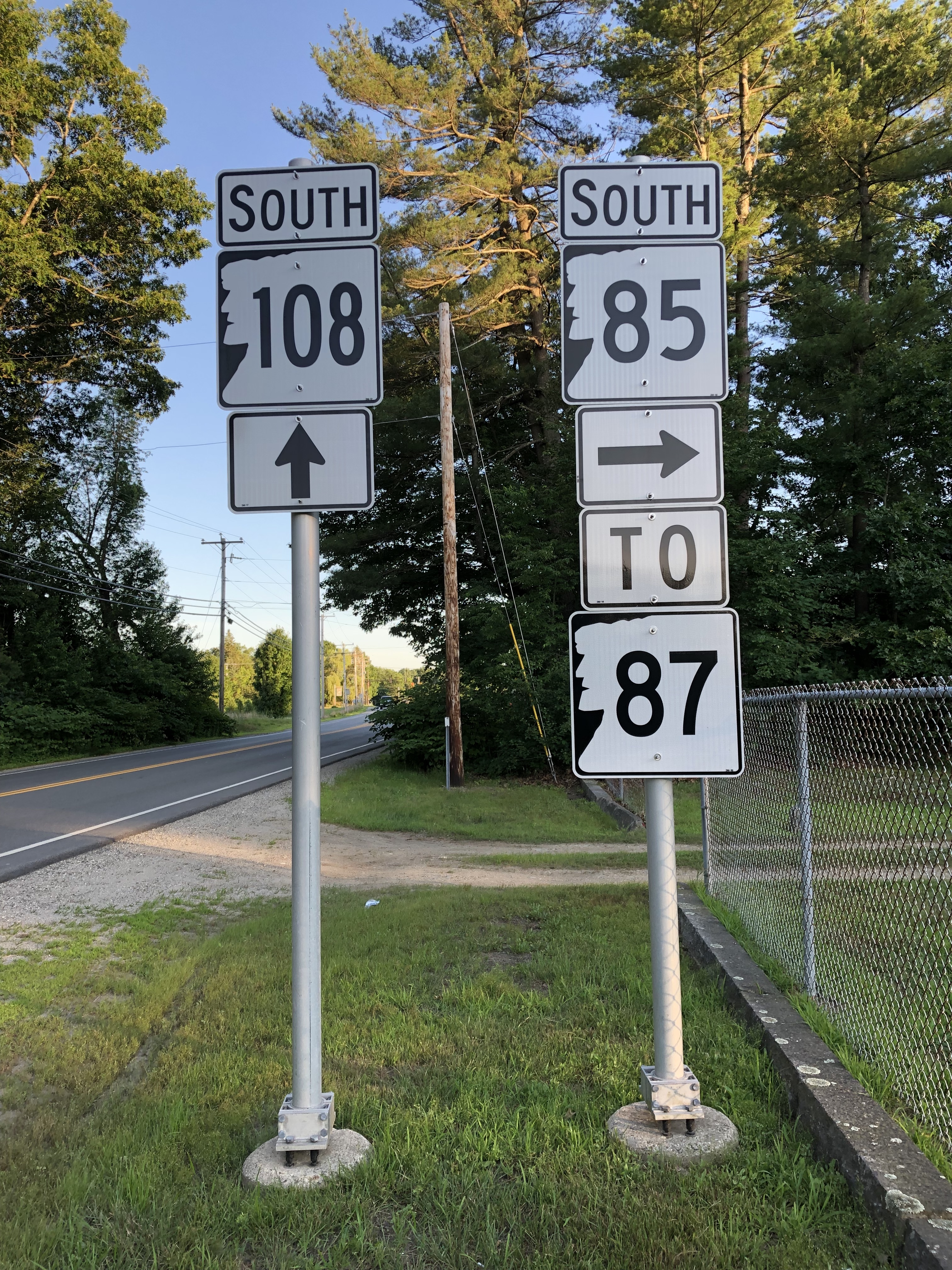
Junction signage in Newfields, as seen in 2005 (left) and 2019

New Hampshire, unlike most other states, has traditionally signed route junctions and concurrencies using green guide signs (similar to those normally found on freeways) instead of individual sign and shield assemblies. However, as signs are being replaced, they are now more often replaced with traditional sign assemblies, especially on non-freeway routes.

== Unnumbered state highways ==
Several unnumbered roads also are maintained by the state, including:

- The Circumferential Highway in Nashua & Hudson (the portion that is built)
- Daniel Webster Highway in South Nashua
