= List of Interstate Highways in New Hampshire =

Interstate Highways of the New Hampshire Highway System
- Highway marker for Interstates 93 and 293
- Interstate Highways highlighted in red

System information
- Formed: August 14, 1957

Highway names
- Interstates: Interstate nn (I-nn)

System links
- New Hampshire Highway System; Interstate; US; State; Turnpikes

The Interstate Highways in New Hampshire comprise three current primary Interstate Highways and two auxiliary Interstates. In addition, one auxiliary Interstate number has been decommissioned along with a lone business Interstate.

== List ==
Number	Length (mi)	Length (km)	Southern or western terminus	Northern or eastern terminus	Formed	Removed	Notes
I-89	60.864	97.951	I-93 & NH 3A in Bow	I-89 at Hartford, VT	1967	current	Highway continues north into Vermont.
I-89 BL	3.9	6.3	I-89 at Enfield	I-89 at Lebanon	1968	2000	From I-89 Exit 17 to Exit 19 along current US 4. Only one shield remained for the route in July 2000 and it was taken down by 2004. It was the only Interstate Business route in New Hampshire.
I-93	131.764	212.054	I-93 at Methuen, MA	I-93 at Waterford, VT	1957	current	Partially tolled between Manchester and Concord as part of the Everett Turnpike. Continues south into Massachusetts and north in Vermont.
I-95	16.193	26.060	I-95 at Salisbury, MA	I-95 at Kittery, ME	1957	current	Tolled as the New Hampshire Turnpike. Continues south into Massachusetts and north into Maine.
I-193	3.291	5.296	I-93/NH 101 in Manchester	Everett Tpk. in Bedford	1961	1976	Southern leg of what is now designated I-293.
I-293	11.771	18.944	I-93/NH 101 in Manchester	I-93/Everett Tpk. in Hooksett	1976	current	Southern leg formerly designated I-193 (1961-1976).
I-393	4.594	7.393	US 202 in Concord	US 4/US 202/NH 9 in Pembroke	1979	current	Concurrent with US 4/US 202 the entire length
Former
