= Interstate 293 =

Highway in New Hampshire

Interstate 293
- I-293 highlighted in red

Route information
- Auxiliary route of I-93
- Maintained by NHDOT
- Length: 11.18 mi (17.99 km)
- NHS: Entire route

Major junctions
- South end: I-93 / NH 101 in Manchester
- NH 28 in Manchester; US 3 / NH 101 / Everett Turnpike in Bedford; US 3 / NH 3A in Manchester
- North end: I-93 / Everett Turnpike in Hooksett

Location
- Country: United States
- State: New Hampshire
- Counties: Hillsborough, Merrimack

Highway system
- Interstate Highway System; Main; Auxiliary; Suffixed; Business; Future; New Hampshire Highway System; Interstate; US; State; Turnpikes
← NH 286	→ US 302
← NH 175A	→ US 202

Interstate 293 (I-293) is an 11-mile-long (18 km) auxiliary Interstate Highway surrounding Manchester, New Hampshire, roughly shaped like two sides of a triangle. Completing the loop in the northeast (the third side of the triangle) is I-93. The southern portion of the loop shares the road with New Hampshire Route 101 (NH 101) and passes near Manchester–Boston Regional Airport and The Mall of New Hampshire. The western portion of the loop shares the road with the Everett Turnpike, but there are no tolls on this portion of the turnpike.

== Route description ==
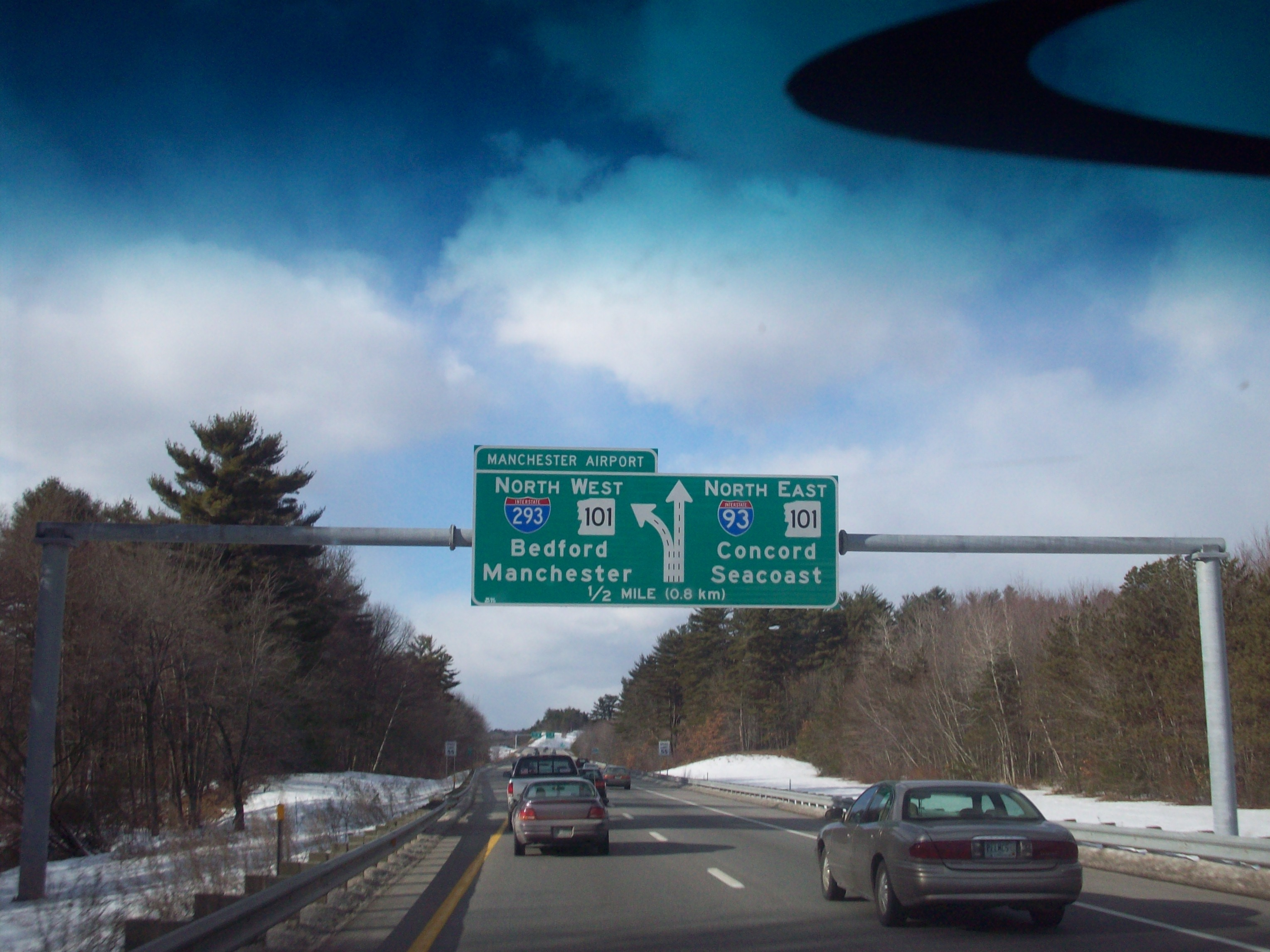
View from I-93 northbound approaching the southern terminus of I-293

I-293 begins at a directional T interchange in the southeast of Manchester, where NH 101 west leaves I-93. I-293 is signed as a north–south road, but, along the section concurrent with NH 101, the road travels in an entirely westerly direction. Exits 1 and 2 provide access to The Mall of New Hampshire area and Manchester–Boston Regional Airport respectively. After crossing the Merrimack River, I-293 enters the modified cloverleaf exit 3 interchange where I-293, NH 101, and the Everett Turnpike intersect. At exit 3, NH 101 leaves I-293 and continues west as a four-lane freeway to its junction with NH 114. I-293 makes a nearly 90-degree turn here, joining the Everett Turnpike and traveling north along the west bank of the Merrimack River. The I-293/Everett Turnpike concurrency heads in to downtown Manchester and is joined by NH 3A at exit 4. Exits 5 and 6 intersect local roads near bridges across the Merrimack River, allowing travelers access to both east and west sides of Manchester. At exit 7, NH 3A leaves the concurrency, while I-293 and the turnpike continue north to the end of I-293 at another interchange with I-93, just south of the Hooksett barrier toll plaza. From here, I-93 and the Everett Turnpike are concurrent to the turnpike's northern end in Concord.

As of June 16, 2008, the project to complete exit 5 as a full interchange was complete. Drivers are now able to exit and enter exit 5 both southbound and northbound. This exit is a single-point urban interchange, the third in New Hampshire.

Like I-393, the other auxiliary Interstate Highway in New Hampshire, I-293 is signed in concurrency with other routes along its entire length and never runs alone other than on transition ramps between NH 101 and the Everett Turnpike. This is due to the I-293 designation having been added to already existing routes, NH 101, and the Everett Turnpike.

== History ==
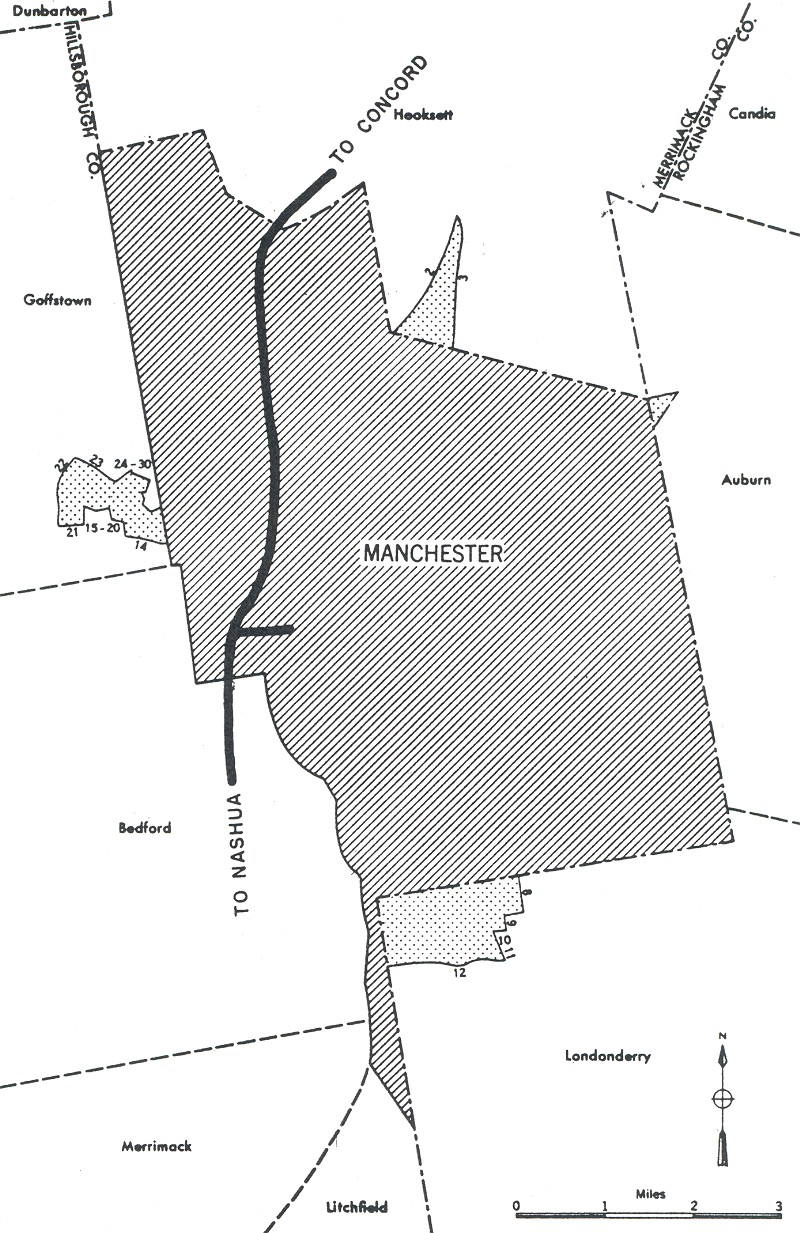
This image shows I-93's proposed route through Manchester. Most of this route would later become I-293.

I-293 overlays portions of two earlier routes that were upgraded to provide the route an Interstate designation. NH 101 was the main east–west route across southern New Hampshire, connecting Keene with (at the time) Portsmouth, and passed through southern Manchester. The Everett Turnpike was an early toll highway connecting the three cities of the Merrimack Valley: Nashua, Manchester, and Concord. When it was accepted into the Interstate Highway System, the short NH 101 freeway from I-93 to the Everett Turnpike was numbered I-193 from 1961 to 1977. When I-93 was completed in 1977, the Everett Turnpike from NH 101 to I-93 was added to the route and it was renumbered as I-293. The NH 101 to Everett Turnpike interchange was later rebuilt to provide a free-flowing transition between the two legs.

== Exit list ==
County	Location	mi	km	Exit	Destinations	Notes
Hillsborough	Manchester	0.000	0.000	–	I-93 / NH 101 east – Salem, Boston, Concord, Portsmouth	Southern terminus; southern end of NH 101 concurrency
Hillsborough	Manchester	1.291	2.078	1	NH 28 (South Willow Street)	Mall of New Hampshire
Hillsborough	Manchester	2.742	4.413	2	NH 3A (Brown Avenue)	Formerly signed for access to Manchester–Boston Regional Airport and town of Litchfield
Hillsborough	Bedford	3.291	5.296	3	US 3 / NH 101 west / Everett Turnpike south to NH 114 – Merrimack, Nashua, Bedford, Milford	No direct northbound access to US 3; northern end of NH 101 concurrency; southern end of Everett Tpke. concurrency; exit number not signed
Hillsborough	Manchester	4.892	7.873	4	US 3 (Queen City Avenue / Second Street) / NH 3A south / NH 114A	Southern end of NH 3A concurrency
Hillsborough	Manchester	5.947	9.571	5	Granite Street – West Manchester	
Hillsborough	Manchester	7.431	11.959	6	Amoskeag Street / Goffstown Road	
Hillsborough	Manchester	8.430	13.567	7	NH 3A north (Front Street) – Hooksett	Northbound exit and southbound entrance; northern end of NH 3A concurrency
Merrimack	Hooksett			–	I-93 south – Salem	Northbound exit and southbound entrance
Merrimack	Hooksett	11.771	18.944	–	I-93 Toll north (Everett Turnpike) – Concord	Northern terminus; northern end of Everett Tpke. concurrency
1.000 mi = 1.609 km; 1.000 km = 0.621 mi: Concurrency terminus; Incomplete access; Tolled
