= Bow, New Hampshire =

- Town
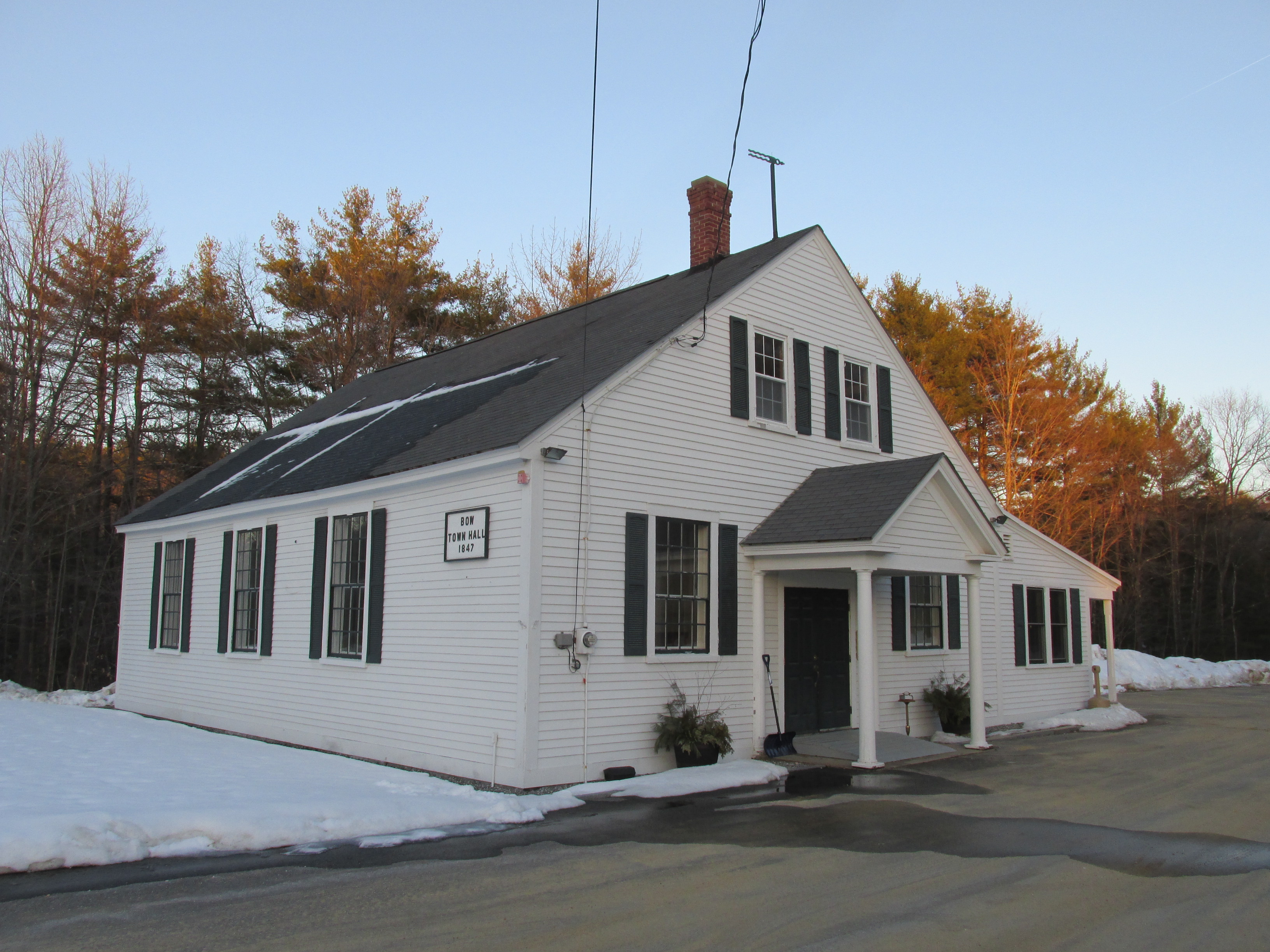
- Bow Town Hall

- Seal

- Location in Merrimack County and the state of New Hampshire
- Coordinates: 43°07′55″N 71°32′57″W
- Country: United States
- State: New Hampshire
- County: Merrimack
- Incorporated: 1727
- Villages: Bow Mills; Bow Center; Bow Bog

Area
  - Total: 28.55 sq mi (73.94 km^{2})
  - Land: 28.17 sq mi (72.96 km^{2})
  - Water: 0.37 sq mi (0.97 km^{2}) 1.32%
- Elevation: 577 ft (176 m)

Population (2020)
  - Total: 8,229
  - Density: 292/sq mi (112.8/km^{2})
- Time zone: UTC-5 (Eastern)
  - Summer (DST): UTC-4 (Eastern)
- ZIP code: 03304
- Area code: 603
- FIPS code: 33-06500
- GNIS feature ID: 873548
- Website: www.bownh.gov

Bow is a town in Merrimack County, New Hampshire, United States. The population was 8,229 at the 2020 census, up from 7,519 at the 2010 census, an increase of 9.4%.

== History ==
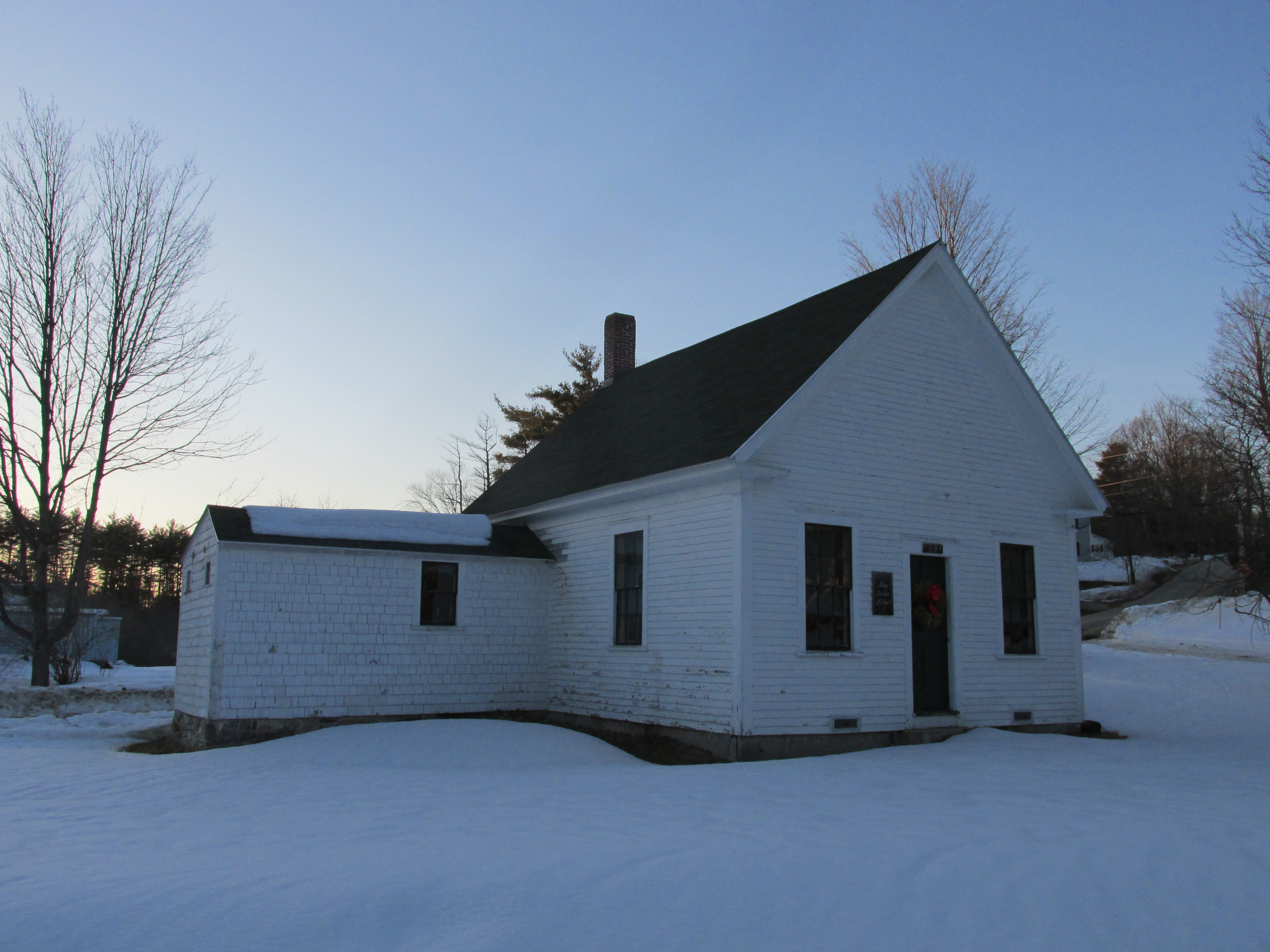
Bow Center School (1894)

The town was granted by the authorities of New Hampshire to Jonathan Wiggin and others in 1727, and was originally 9 miles (14 km) square, covering nearly all the territory granted to Ebenezer Eastman and others by the authorities of Massachusetts two years previous, under the name of "Pennacook" (now Concord). Massachusetts claimed to hold authority over a large portion of the territory of New Hampshire for many years, until the final boundary line was established in 1741, giving New Hampshire more territory than it had ever claimed.

These complicated lines of the two towns coming from two different authorities were not settled decisively until after the final separation of the two colonial provinces. The government of New Hampshire gave Bow the preference in its grant of 1727, and did not recognize the title of the Pennacook grantees, and in the bill giving a charter for the parish of Concord, it was worded as "taking a part of the town of Bow," etc. Although Concord was granted and surveyed before Bow, its final organization was 38 years after it. Bow gained a victory over Concord in its original title; still it was obliged to yield over two-thirds of its territory to Concord, Pembroke and Hopkinton, establishing their final boundary lines at different times, from 1759 to 1765.

The town's name comes from its establishment along a bend, or "bow", in the Merrimack River. The first census, taken in 1790, reported 568 residents.

In 1874, the Concord Railroad passed along the eastern border of Bow. It is now the New England Southern Railroad.

On September 28, 2019, hundreds of climate activists protested in Bow against Merrimack Station, one of the last remaining coal-fired power plants in New England. 67 people, who carried buckets signifying their intent to physically remove coal from the site, were arrested by state police. The power plant closed permanently on September 12, 2025. The plant will be converted into a clean energy plant.

== Geography ==
According to the United States Census Bureau, the town has a total area of 28.5 square miles (73.9 km^{2}), of which 28.2 square miles (73.0 km^{2}) are land and 0.39 square miles (1.0 km^{2}) is water, comprising 1.32% of the town. The highest point in Bow is Picked Hill, at 915 feet (279 m) above sea level, in the southern part of town. Nearby, Wood Hill and Brown Hill also top 900 feet (270 m). Bow lies fully within the Merrimack River watershed. The Merrimack River forms the northeastern border of the town.

== Demographics ==
Historical population
Census	Pop.	Note	%±
1790	568		—
1800	719		26.6%
1810	729		1.4%
1820	935		28.3%
1830	1,065		13.9%
1840	1,001		−6.0%
1850	1,055		5.4%
1860	909		−13.8%
1870	745		−18.0%
1880	734		−1.5%
1890	725		−1.2%
1900	617		−14.9%
1910	676		9.6%
1920	568		−16.0%
1930	780		37.3%
1940	942		20.8%
1950	1,062		12.7%
1960	1,340		26.2%
1970	2,479		85.0%
1980	4,015		62.0%
1990	5,500		37.0%
2000	7,138		29.8%
2010	7,519		5.3%
2020	8,229		9.4%
U.S. Decennial Census

At the 2000 census there were 7,138 people in 2,304 households, including 2,045 families, in the town. The population density was 254.3 inhabitants per square mile (98.2/km^{2}). There were 2,330 housing units at an average density of 83.0 per square mile (32.0/km^{2}). The racial makeup of the town was 97.79% White, 0.13% African American, 0.10% Native American, 1.04% Asian, 0.29% from other races, and 0.66% from two or more races. Hispanic or Latino of any race were 0.49%.

For the 2015-2019 period, the median household income was $122,230. The per capita income for the town was $48,900. About 2.0% of families and 1.8% of the population were below the poverty line, including 0.6% of those under age 18 and 4.2% of those age 65 or over.

Of the 2,304 households 49.1% had children under the age of 18 living with them, 81.0% were married couples living together, 5.9% had a female householder with no husband present, and 11.2% were non-families. 8.6% of households were one person and 3.6% were one person aged 65 or older. The average household size was 3.10 and the average family size was 3.28.

The age distribution was 32.6% under the age of 18, 4.4% from 18 to 24, 27.3% from 25 to 44, 27.2% from 45 to 64, and 8.4% 65 or older. The median age was 39 years. For every 100 females, there were 99.5 males. For every 100 females age 18 and over, there were 93.7 males.

== Government ==
Bow is a part of New Hampshire's 2nd congressional district. Bow is currently represented by Democrat Maggie Goodlander in the United States House of Representatives. In the New Hampshire Senate, Bow is a part of New Hampshire's 15th State Senate district, currently represented by Tara Reardon (D-Concord). In the New Hampshire House of Representatives, Bow sits in District 9 and is represented by Eleana Marie Colby, Muriel Hall, David Luneau, and James Newson.

Like many suburban communities in southeastern New Hampshire, Bow historically leaned Republican. Over the past decade Democrats have improved, with Hillary Clinton and Joe Biden greatly exceeding their statewide margins of victory in the town.

Bow town presidential vote
Year	Democratic	Republican
2020	59.1% 3,256	39.4% 2,167
2016	52.1% 2,570	42.9% 2,119
2012	51.0% 2,504	47.9% 2,352
2008	53.4% 2,585	46.0% 2,227

== Education ==
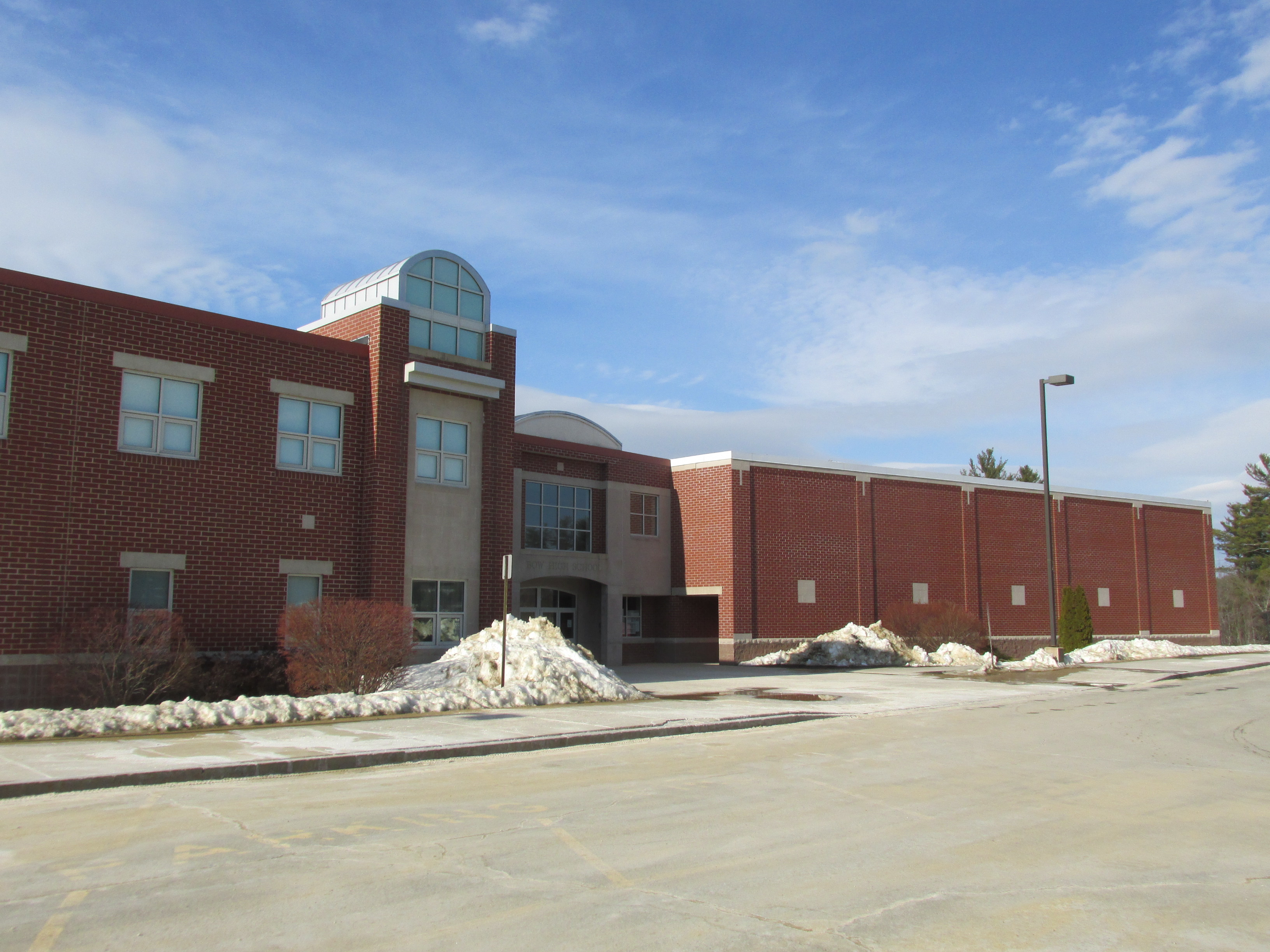
Bow High School

In 1997, Bow built its first high school, Bow High School, adjacent to Turee Pond off White Rock Hill Road. Bow Memorial School (a middle school) and Bow Elementary School are located nearby.

== Infrastructure ==
=== Transportation ===
Two New Hampshire State Routes and two Interstate Highways cross Bow: NH 3A, NH 13, Interstate 93, and Interstate 89.

== Notable people ==
- Jamie Aube (born 1953), NASCAR driver
- Henry M. Baker (1841-1912), U.S. representative
- Austin Brummett (born 2004), soccer player
- Mary Baker Eddy (1821–1910), founder of the Church of Christ, Scientist; born in Bow
- Sam Knox (1910–1981), American football player
- James M. Langley (1894–1969), editor of the Concord Monitor and ambassador of the United States to Pakistan (1957 to 1959)
- John Ordway (1775–1817), member of the Lewis and Clark Expedition
- Caleb Scofield (1978–2018), bassist/vocalist for Cave In, Old Man Gloom, Zozobra
- Dick Swett (born 1957), former U.S. representative
