= Litchfield, New Hampshire =

- Town
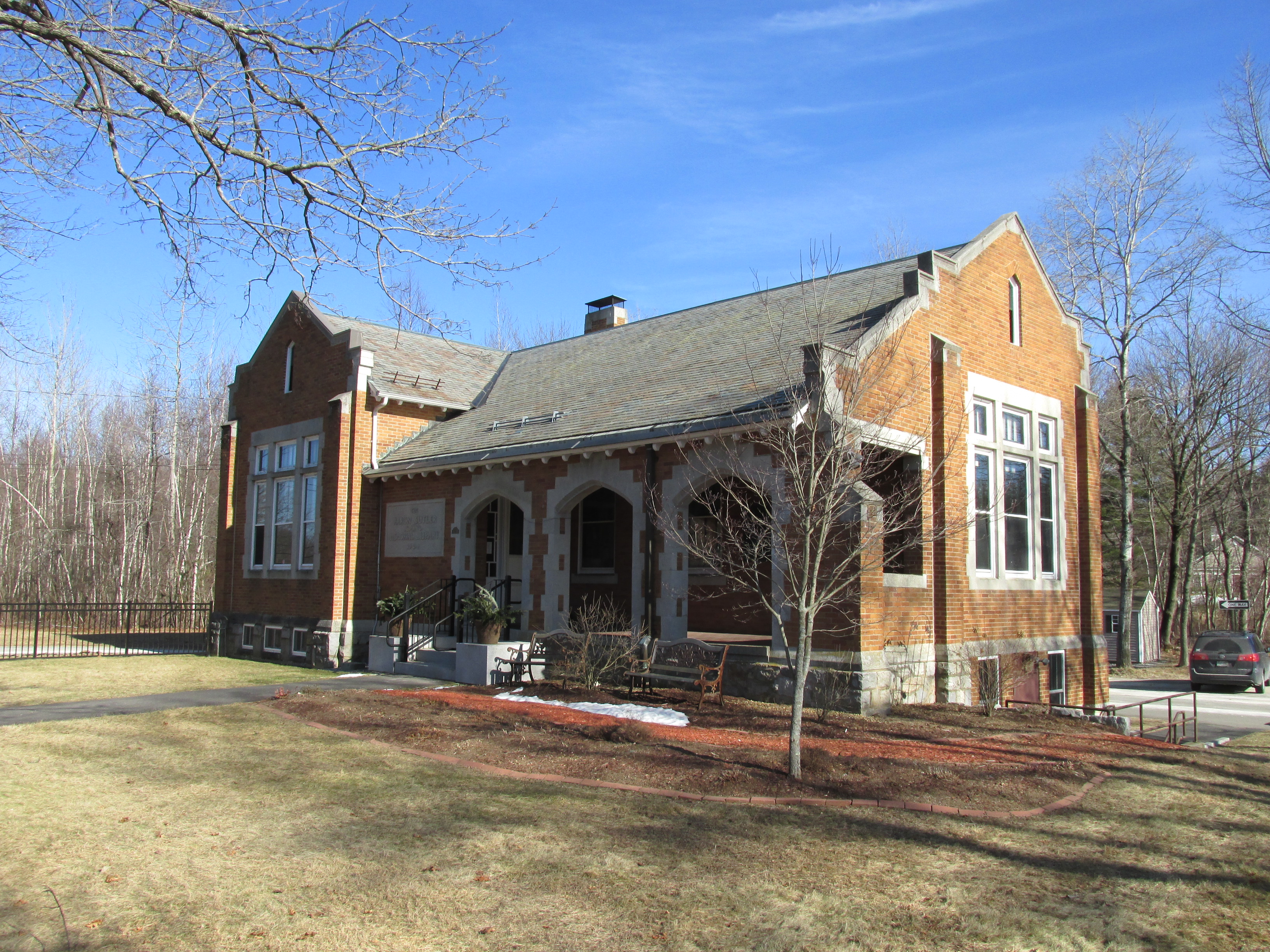
- Aaron Cutler Memorial Library

- Flag Seal

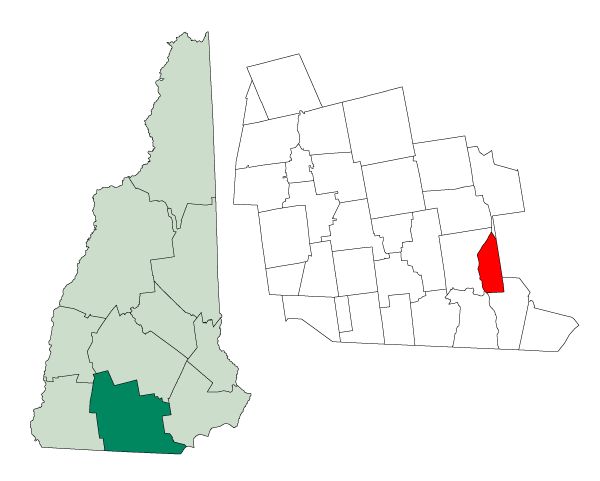
- Location in Hillsborough County, New Hampshire
- Coordinates: 42°51′29″N 71°27′17″W
- Country: United States
- State: New Hampshire
- County: Hillsborough
- Incorporated: 1734 in Massachusetts, 1749 in New Hampshire

Government
  - Type: Town Meeting (SB2)

Area
  - Total: 15.31 sq mi (39.64 km^{2})
  - Land: 14.92 sq mi (38.65 km^{2})
  - Water: 0.38 sq mi (0.99 km^{2}) 2.50%
- Elevation: 203 ft (62 m)

Population (2020)
  - Total: 8,478
  - Density: 568/sq mi (219.3/km^{2})
- Time zone: UTC−5 (Eastern)
  - Summer (DST): UTC−4 (Eastern)
- ZIP code: 03052
- Area code: 603
- FIPS code: 33-42260
- GNIS feature ID: 873648
- Website: litchfieldnh.gov

Litchfield is a town in Hillsborough County, New Hampshire, United States. The population was 8,478 at the 2020 census.

== History ==
Prior to European settlement, the area was populated by the Abenaki people. They were skilled with fishing and were adept in agriculture as well. The New Hampshire Archaeological Society has located over 30 Native American sites along the shore of the Merrimack River in Litchfield, with artifacts several thousands of years old being uncovered.

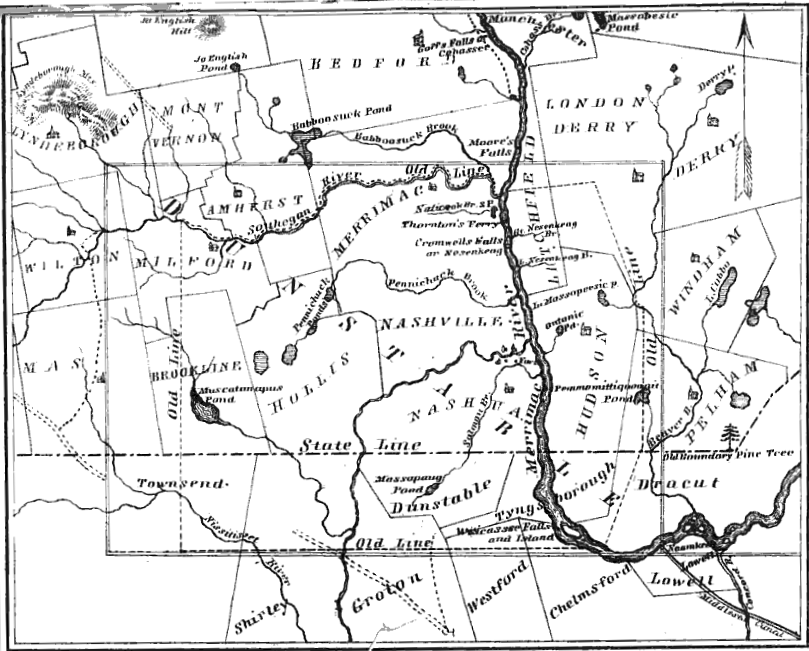
Extent of Old Dunstable (dashed line), which included much of modern-day Litchfield

Most of Litchfield was part of the large town known as Dunstable, which was organized in the 1600s and included land along both sides of the disputed New Hampshire-Massachusetts boundary, and out of which were carved several towns and cities in both states. The area which became Litchfield was originally known as "Naticook". In 1656, William Brenton, colonial governor of Rhode Island, was granted land which included much of present-day Litchfield. The name was changed to "Brenton's Farm" in 1729. The town was first incorporated into Massachusetts on July 4, 1734. The first town meeting was held on Monday, July 29, 1734, at 1 pm at the house of Aquila Underwood to choose town officers. In 1749, the land was granted to another group of settlers and named "Litchfield" after George Henry Lee, Earl of Lichfield. Litchfield was incorporated into the Province of New Hampshire on June 5, 1749.

Litchfield lacks any major population center or central village. Historically farmland, the town experienced steep population growth starting in the 1970s, along with the rest of southern New Hampshire, as a bedroom community and exurb for Greater Boston. The original town hall was located along New Hampshire Route 3A in the east-central portion of the town; the current town hall lies at the town's geographic center at the intersection of Hillcrest Road and Albuquerque Avenue. There are no large commercial districts in the town, though a few small industrial parks, convenience stores, and small restaurants dot the landscape.

On December 12, 1991, a cross burning took place in Litchfield, but no one was hurt. In 1995, Russell Trim was arrested and charged with the crime.

== Geography ==
According to the United States Census Bureau, the town has a total area of 15.3 square miles (39.6 km^{2}), of which 14.9 square miles (38.7 km^{2}) are land and 0.4 square miles (1.0 km^{2}) is water, comprising 2.50% of the town. The highest point in Litchfield is the summit of Rocky Hill, near the center of town in Litchfield State Forest, at 357 feet (109 m) above sea level. The town is bordered to the north by Manchester, to the east by Londonderry in Rockingham County, to the south by Hudson, to the west by Merrimack, and to the extreme southwest by Nashua, with the Merrimack River separating Litchfield from both Merrimack and Nashua. There is no bridge connecting Litchfield and Merrimack; the closest river crossings are to the south between Nashua and Hudson, and to the north between Manchester and Bedford.

There are two islands in the Merrimack River within the borders of Litchfield. The islands have been called "Minnewawa" and "Nunnehaha", the Naticook Islands, and Reed's Islands. The northern island is located within Litchfield, while the southern island is essentially split down the middle by the boundary between Litchfield and Merrimack, forming the only land border between the two towns. Merrimack owns both islands.

=== Adjacent municipalities ===
- Manchester (north)
- Londonderry (east)
- Hudson (south & southeast)
- Nashua (southwest)
- Merrimack (west)

== Demographics ==
Historical population
Census	Pop.	Note	%±
1790	357		—
1800	372		4.2%
1810	382		2.7%
1820	465		21.7%
1830	505		8.6%
1840	481		−4.8%
1850	447		−7.1%
1860	352		−21.3%
1870	345		−2.0%
1880	291		−15.7%
1890	252		−13.4%
1900	243		−3.6%
1910	255		4.9%
1920	213		−16.5%
1930	286		34.3%
1940	341		19.2%
1950	427		25.2%
1960	721		68.9%
1970	1,420		96.9%
1980	4,150		192.3%
1990	5,516		32.9%
2000	7,360		33.4%
2010	8,271		12.4%
2020	8,478		2.5%
2024 (est.)	8,554		0.9%
U.S. Decennial Census

As of the census of 2000, there were 7,360 people, 2,357 households, and 2,031 families residing in the town. The population density was 487.5 inhabitants per square mile (188.2/km^{2}). There were 2,389 housing units at an average density of 160.1 per square mile (61.8/km^{2}) accounting for actual land area available. The racial makeup of the town was 97.72% White, 0.53% African American, 0.29% Native American, 0.57% Asian, 0.15% from other races, and 0.75% from two or more races. Hispanic or Latino of any race were 0.83% of the population.

There were 2,357 households, out of which 53.4% had children under the age of 18 living with them, 75.3% were married couples living together, 7.4% had a female householder with no husband present, and 13.8% were non-families. 9.5% of all households were made up of individuals, and 1.4% had someone living alone who was 65 years of age or older. The average household size was 3.12 and the average family size was 3.35.

In the town, the population was spread out, with 33.4% under the age of 18, 5.4% from 18 to 24, 37.8% from 25 to 44, 19.9% from 45 to 64, and 3.5% who were 65 years of age or older. The median age was 33 years. For every 100 females, there were 101.1 males. For every 100 females age 18 and over, there were 98.1 males.

The median income for a household in the town was $73,302, and the median income for a family was $76,931. Males had a median income of $46,809 versus $33,488 for females. The per capita income for the town was $25,203. About 2.2% of families and 2.1% of the population were below the poverty line, including 1.6% of those under age 18 and 12.1% of those age 65 or over.

== Education ==
There are three public schools in Litchfield:

- Griffin Memorial School (K–4)
- Litchfield Middle School (5–8)
- Campbell High School (9–12)

== Transportation ==
Two New Hampshire state highways cross Litchfield:

- New Hampshire Route 3A closely parallels the Merrimack River, entering the town from Hudson in the south, and leaving the town into Manchester in the north. It is known as the Charles Bancroft Highway through the town.
- New Hampshire Route 102 (Derry Road) crosses the extreme southeast corner of town. It enters Hudson at both borders.

Though the town borders Merrimack on the west, it cannot be directly accessed as there are no bridges across the river. Access to Londonderry, to the east of Litchfield, is primarily via Hillcrest Road, which is the main east–west thoroughfare across central Litchfield.

Litchfield has no air or rail transport within the town limits. The nearest commercial airport is Manchester–Boston Regional Airport along the border of Londonderry and Manchester, which is close to the northern border of Litchfield. The nearest rail service is the Lowell Line of the MBTA Commuter Rail system, which can be accessed at the Charles A. Gallagher Transit Terminal in Lowell, Massachusetts. The nearest Amtrak stations are Boston's North Station or South Station. There was a trolley that ran through Litchfield in the early 20th century, but it was long since discontinued and fallen into disrepair. There are few remnants left, including a portion of rail trail and a dilapidated trolley bridge within Parker Park.

== Government and municipal services ==
The town of Litchfield operates a waste management and transfer station on Hillcrest Road, located near the geographical center of Litchfield and the "new" town hall, police and fire station. The historical center of Litchfield is on the Charles Bancroft Highway (New Hampshire Route 3A). Today the first church in Litchfield, the Litchfield Community Television studio, and the Litchfield Historical Society are located there in and around the old town hall and fire station. The town's new fire station opened on Liberty Way in May 2019.

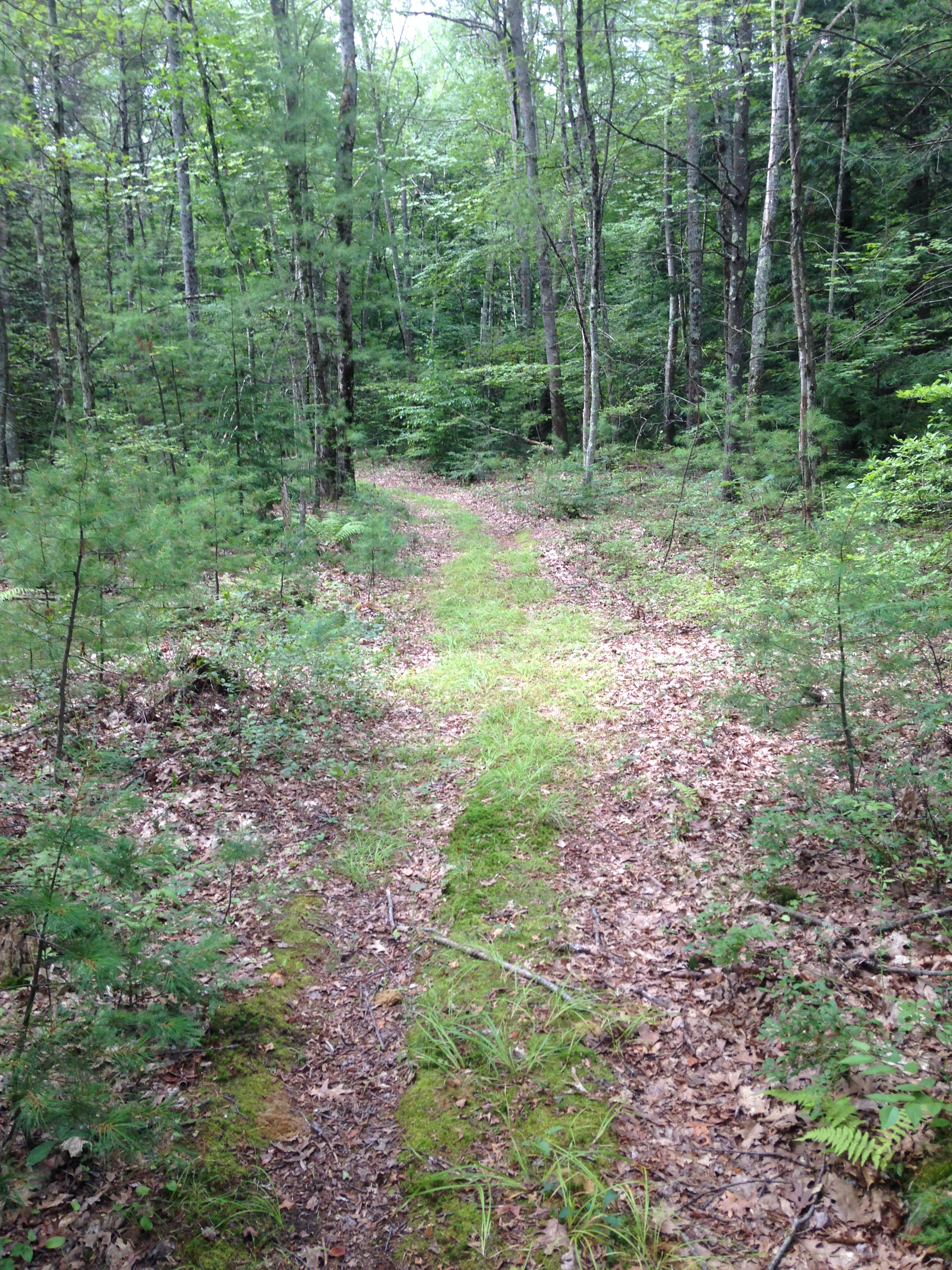
A trail in a conservation area in Litchfield

Several public parks, including Roy Memorial Park and the Litchfield State Forest, are open year-round to the public. Municipal parks are managed by the Litchfield Recreation Commission. The state forest is managed by the New Hampshire Department of Natural and Cultural Resources, among other agencies.

The Litchfield Mosquito Control District was featured on Last Week Tonight with John Oliver. The episode featured segments from a televised town meeting from September 17, 2015, which had no members of the public in attendance.

The town has several conservation areas, including Moore's Falls, Parker Park, the Community Garden, and the John Bryant River Access. The Litchfield Conservation Commission holds the responsibility of managing these lands for the preservation and proper utilization of natural resources in town.

== Notable people ==
- Clifton Clagett (1762–1829), US congressman
- Jack McQuesten (1836–1909), Alaskan and Yukon pioneer and explorer
- Jennifer Simard (born 1970), Tony Award nominated actress
