= New Hampshire Route 127 =

State highway in central New Hampshire, US

New Hampshire Route 127
- Map of central New Hampshire with NH 127 highlighted in red

Route information
- Maintained by NHDOT
- Length: 31.636 mi (50.913 km)

Major junctions
- South end: US 202 / NH 9 in Hopkinton
- I-89 in Hopkinton; US 4 in Salisbury; US 3 / NH 3A / NH 11 in Franklin; I-93 in Sanbornton
- North end: NH 132 in Sanbornton

Location
- Country: United States
- State: New Hampshire
- Counties: Merrimack, Belknap

Highway system
- New Hampshire Highway System; Interstate; US; State; Turnpikes
← NH 126	→ NH 128

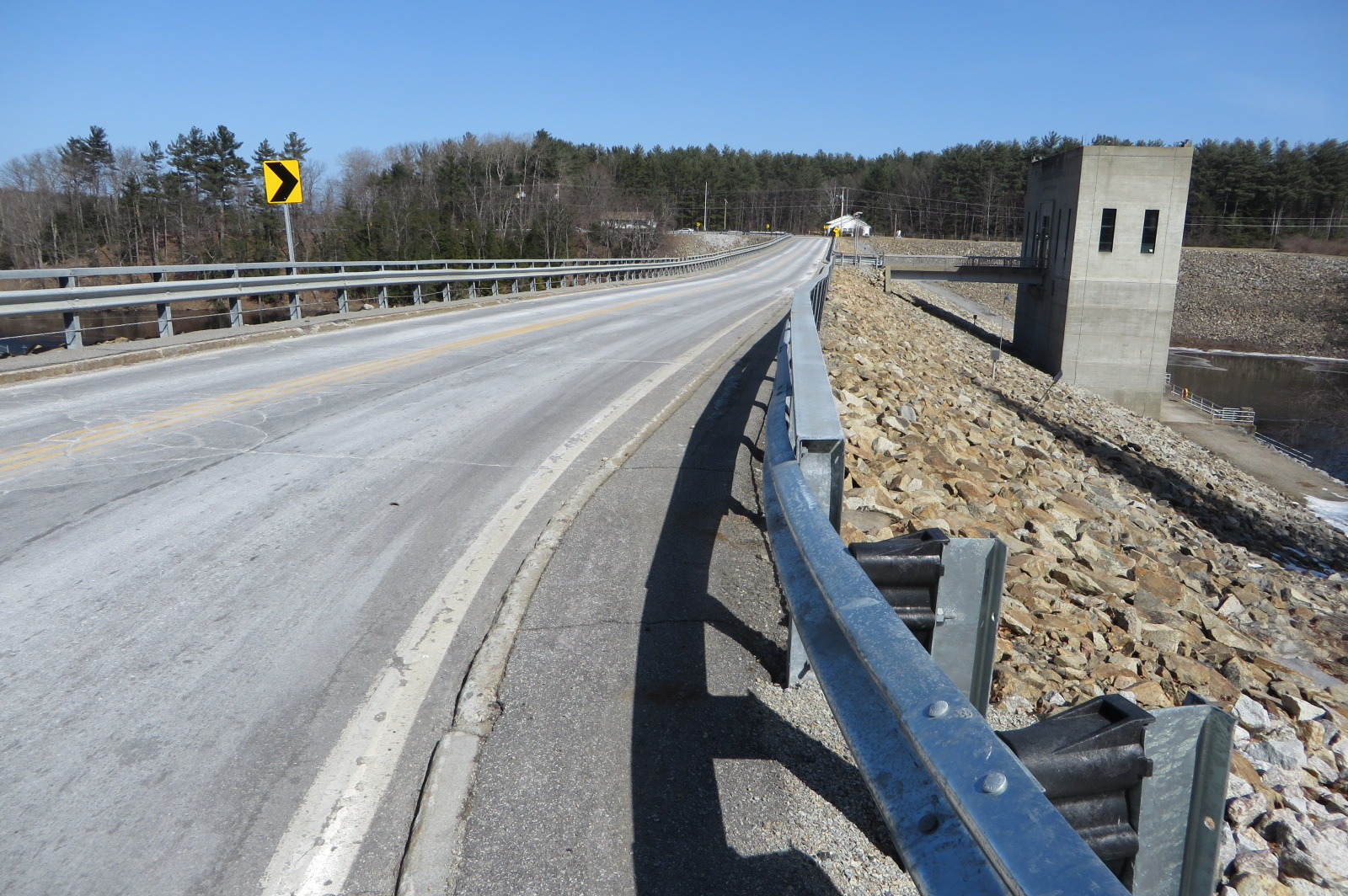
NH 127 crossing the Hopkinton Dam, West Hopkinton, NH

New Hampshire Route 127 (abbreviated NH 127) is a 31.636-mile-long (50.913 km) north–south state highway in central New Hampshire. The highway runs from Hopkinton in Merrimack County northward to Sanbornton in Belknap County.

The southern terminus of NH 127 is at U.S. Route 202 and New Hampshire Route 9 in Hopkinton, where the highway is known as Maple Street. The northern terminus of NH 127 is in Sanbornton at New Hampshire Route 132 as New Hampton Road.

== Major intersections ==
County	Location	mi	km	Destinations	Notes
Merrimack	Hopkinton	0.000	0.000	US 202 / NH 9 – Concord, Henniker, Hillsborough	Southern terminus
Merrimack	Hopkinton	3.316– 3.570	5.337– 5.745	I-89 – Hopkinton, Concord, Lebanon	Exit 6 on I-89
Merrimack	Hopkinton	4.848	7.802	NH 103 east – Hopkinton	Southern end of concurrency with NH 103
Merrimack	Warner	6.975	11.225	NH 103 west – Warner	Northern end of concurrency with NH 103
Merrimack	Salisbury	17.818	28.675	US 4 – Andover, Concord	
Merrimack	Franklin	23.350	37.578	US 3 south – Concord	Southern end of concurrency with US 3
Merrimack	Franklin	24.012	38.644	NH 3A north / NH 11 west – Bristol, Andover	Southern terminus NH 3A (northern segment); southern end of concurrency with NH 11
Merrimack	Franklin	24.460	39.365	US 3 north / NH 11 east – Tilton, Laconia	Northern end of concurrency with US 3 / NH 11
Belknap	Sanbornton	29.702– 29.945	47.801– 48.192	I-93 – Tilton, Concord, Ashland, Plymouth	Exit 22 on I-93
Belknap	Sanbornton	31.636	50.913	NH 132 – New Hampton, Sanbornton, Tilton	Northern terminus
1.000 mi = 1.609 km; 1.000 km = 0.621 mi: Concurrency terminus
