= Union Lake =

Union Lake may refer to:

- Union Lake (Polk County, Minnesota)
- Union Lake (Rice County, Minnesota)
- Union Lake, Michigan, an unincorporated community
- Union Lake (Michigan), a lake
- Union Lake, also known as Swains Lake in New Hampshire

== See also ==
- Lake Union, Seattle, Washington
