= U.S. Route 4 in New Hampshire =

Segment of American highway

U.S. Route 4
- US 4 highlighted in red

Route information
- Maintained by NHDOT
- Length: 106.834 mi (171.933 km)
- Existed: 1926–present

Major junctions
- West end: US 4 at the Vermont state line in West Lebanon
- I-89 in Lebanon; US 3 in Boscawen; I-93 in Penacook; I-93 / US 202 in Concord; US 202 / NH 9 in Northwood; NH 16 / Spaulding Turnpike in Dover
- East end: I-95 / US 1 Byp. in Portsmouth

Location
- Country: United States
- State: New Hampshire
- Counties: Grafton, Merrimack, Rockingham, Strafford

Highway system
- United States Numbered Highway System; List; Special; Divided; New Hampshire Highway System; Interstate; US; State; Turnpikes
| ← NH 3B | → NH 4 |
| ← NH 4 | → NH 9 |

U.S. Route 4 in New Hampshire runs for 106.834 miles (171.933 km) across the central and southern part of the state, stretching from Lebanon on the Connecticut River border with Vermont southeast to Portsmouth on the eastern coast.

== Route description ==
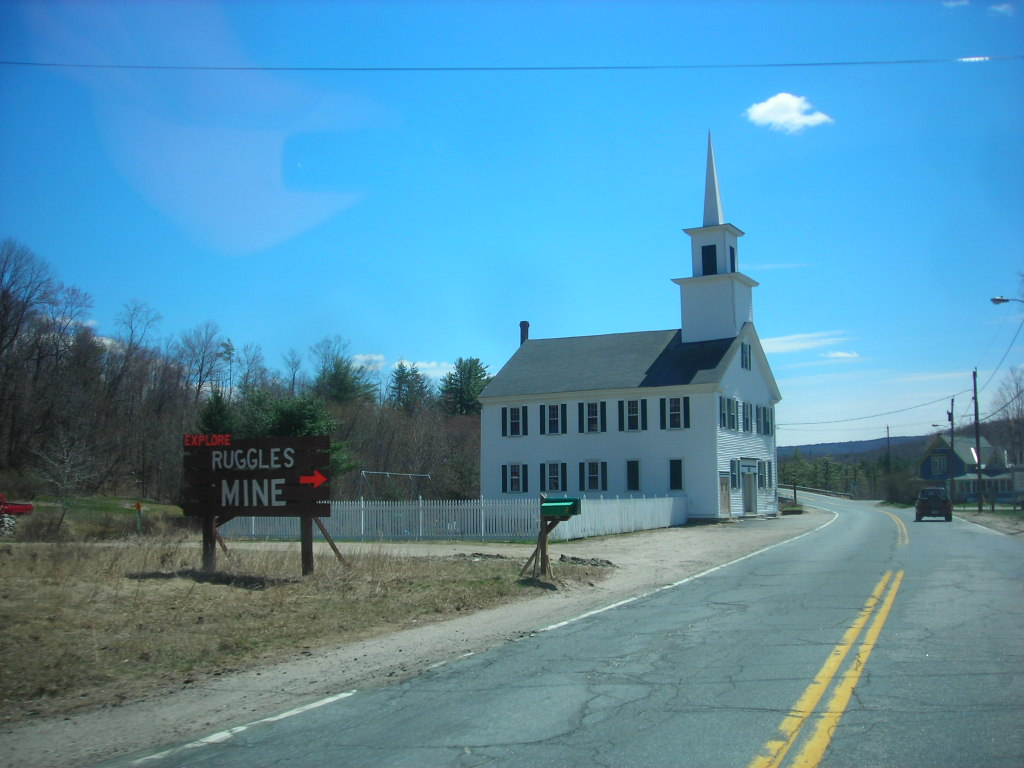
Route 4 in Grafton near the entrance to Ruggles Mine

US 4 crosses the Connecticut River into New Hampshire in the community of West Lebanon, where it immediately intersects New Hampshire Route 10 (NH 10) which runs parallel to the river. US 4 turns south onto NH 10, and the two routes turn south, meeting NH 12A before turning toward and interchanging with Interstate 89 (I-89). At this point, NH 10 joins the I-89 freeway southbound, while US 4 continues east into downtown Lebanon. The road crosses NH 120, continues east, and interchanges with I-89/NH 10 again. US 4 continues east away from the freeway near Mascoma Lake, where NH 4A splits off to the southeast. US 4 continues east through Enfield and into Canaan, where it meets the southern end of NH 118. The road turns to the south at this point, passing through Grafton and Danbury, where US 4 meets the west end of NH 104 and continues south into Andover. In Andover, US 4 turns back to the east and meets NH 11 near NH 4A's eastern terminus. US 4 and NH 11 run concurrently through Andover for about two miles (3.2 km) before splitting, NH 11 to the northeast and US 4 to the southeast. US 4 enters the town of Salisbury and crosses NH 127, before continuing into Boscawen and intersecting with US 3. US 3 and US 4 share a short concurrency (about a mile [1.6 km]), before US 4 turns east to interchange with I-93 at Exit 17.

US 4 joins I-93 southbound and runs along the freeway until exit 15E in Concord. At this interchange, US 4 leaves I-93 and joins I-393 and US 202 which run eastbound out of the city. The two U.S. Routes overlap I-393 to its terminus in the northern corner of Pembroke. I-393 then ends, and US 4/US 202 merge onto NH 9 eastbound through Chichester and into Epsom. The road crosses NH 28 at the Epsom Traffic Circle, then continues east and intersects NH 107, forming a two-mile-long (3.2 km) four-route concurrency into Northwood, where NH 107 splits off to the northwest. US 4, US 202, and NH 9 continue through Northwood, and US 202 and NH 9 split from US 4 at an intersection with NH 43.

US 4 continues east, meeting the west end of NH 152 and proceeding into Nottingham and then into Lee, where US 4 meets NH 125 at a two-lane roundabout. After leaving this interchange, US 4 crosses into Durham and becomes a semi-limited-access highway. US 4 has a partial eastbound interchange with NH 155 and a diamond interchange with NH 155A down the road, providing access to the University of New Hampshire campus in Durham. US 4 has one more interchange, with NH 108, before becoming a full-access highway again. US 4 continues east toward the coast and crosses the tidal Bellamy River to enter Dover, then interchanges with the Spaulding Turnpike (NH 16). US 4 joins the turnpike southbound, closely paralleling the Maine state border and crossing the Little Bay Bridge into the town of Newington before continuing into the city of Portsmouth. US 4 terminates just south of the Maine state line at the final southbound interchange with I-95, where the turnpike splits to merge with I-95 south, and NH 16 continues south to end at the Portsmouth Traffic Circle, providing access to I-95 north and US 1 Bypass.

== History ==
The section of US 4 from the Vermont state line to Andover (and NH 11 from Andover to Franklin) was first numbered in 1925 as an eastern extension of Route 14. From Franklin to Concord, the road was designated as Route 6 (now US 3), and, from Concord to Northwood, it was Route 9 (now NH 9). Between Northwood and Dover, the road was previously not numbered. From Dover to its eastern terminus at Portsmouth, the road used part of Route 16 (now NH 16).

== Junction list ==
| County | Location | mi | km | Exit | Destinations | Notes |
|---|---|---|---|---|---|---|
| Grafton | Lebanon | 0.000 | 0.000 | | US 4 west (Bridge Street) to US 5 / VT 14 north – White River Junction | Continuation into Vermont |
| Grafton | Lebanon | 0.247 | 0.398 | | NH 10 north (North Main Street) – Hanover | Western end of concurrency with NH 10 |
| Grafton | Lebanon | 0.587 | 0.945 | | NH 12A south (South Main Street) | Northern terminus of NH 12A |
| Grafton | Lebanon | 2.230 | 3.589 | | I-89 / NH 10 south – Enfield, Concord, Vermont | Exit 19 on I-89; eastern end of concurrency with NH 10 |
| Grafton | Lebanon | 3.811– 3.934 | 6.133– 6.331 | | NH 120 (Hanover Street / School Street) – Hanover, Meriden, Claremont | |
| Grafton | Lebanon | 6.091 | 9.803 | | I-89 / NH 10 – Grantham, Concord, Lebanon, Hanover, Vermont | Exit 17 on I-89 / NH 10 |
| Grafton | Lebanon | 7.858 | 12.646 | | NH 4A south – Enfield Center, Andover | Northern terminus of NH 4A |
| Grafton | Canaan | 17.695 | 28.477 | | NH 118 north (Dorchester Road) – Dorchester, Rumney | Southern terminus of NH 118 |
| Merrimack | Danbury | 31.624 | 50.894 | | NH 104 east (Ragged Mountain Highway) – Bristol | Western terminus of NH 104 |
| Merrimack | Andover | 38.639 | 62.183 | | NH 11 west (Main Street) – New London | Western end of concurrency with NH 11 |
| Merrimack | Andover | 41.401 | 66.628 | | NH 11 east (Franklin Highway) – Franklin | Eastern end of concurrency with NH 11 |
| Merrimack | Salisbury | 47.442 | 76.350 | | NH 127 (South Road / Franklin Road) – Webster, Franklin | |
| Merrimack | Boscawen | 53.880 | 86.711 | | US 3 north (Daniel Webster Highway) – Franklin | Western end of concurrency with US 3 |
| Merrimack | Boscawen | 55.155 | 88.763 | | US 3 south (North Main Street) – Penacook | Eastern end of concurrency with US 3 |
| Merrimack | Concord | 57.937 | 93.241 | 17 | I-93 north (Styles Bridges Highway) / Hoit Road to NH 132 – Tilton, Plymouth | Western end of concurrency with I-93 |
| Merrimack | Concord | 61.233 | 98.545 | 16 | NH 132 (East Side Drive) – East Concord | Via West Portsmouth St. |
| Merrimack | Concord | 63.413 | 102.053 | 15 | I-93 south (Styles Bridges Highway) / US 202 to I-89 west / US 3 (North Main Street) – Manchester, Lebanon, Downtown I-393 begins | Eastern end of concurrency with I-93; western terminus of I-393; western end of concurrency with US 202; exit number not signed westbound |
| Merrimack | Concord | 63.670 | 102.467 | 1 | Fort Eddy Road – NHTI Community College | |
| Merrimack | Concord | 63.965 | 102.942 | Veterans Memorial Bridge over the Merrimack River | | |
| Merrimack | Concord | 64.730 | 104.173 | 2 | NH 132 (East Side Drive) | |
| Merrimack | Concord | 66.557 | 107.113 | 3 | NH 106 (Sheep Davis Road) to NH 9 – Laconia, Pembroke | |
| Merrimack | Pembroke | 68.008 | 109.448 | | NH 9 west – Concord Hgts. Business District I-393 ends | Eastern terminus of I-393; western end of concurrency with NH 9; westbound exit and eastbound entrance |
| Merrimack | Epsom | 73.088 | 117.624 | | NH 28 (Suncook Valley Highway) – Pittsfield, Allenstown | Roundabout |
| Merrimack | Epsom | 76.748 | 123.514 | | NH 107 south – Deerfield, Raymond | Western end of concurrency with NH 107 |
| Rockingham | Northwood | 78.657 | 126.586 | | NH 107 north (School Street) – Pittsfield | Eastern end of concurrency with NH 107 |
| Rockingham | Northwood | 84.501 | 135.991 | | US 202 east / NH 9 east (Rochester Road) / NH 43 south (Mountain Avenue) – Dover, Rochester, Deerfield, Candia | Eastern end of concurrency with US 202 / NH 9; northern terminus of NH 43 |
| Rockingham | Northwood | 85.163 | 137.057 | | NH 152 east (Nottingham Road) – Nottingham, Lee | Western terminus of NH 152 |
| Strafford | Lee | 92.597 | 149.020 | | NH 125 (Calef Highway) – Epping, Kingston, Manchester, Barrington, Rochester | Roundabout |
| Strafford | Lee | 93.968 | 151.227 | | NH 155 (Turtle Pond Road) – Lee, Madbury | Eastbound exit and westbound entrance |
| Strafford | Durham | 95.292 | 153.358 | | NH 155A (Main Street) – Durham, Lee | Interchange |
| Strafford | Durham | 98.325 | 158.239 | | NH 108 (Dover Road) – Durham, Dover, Newmarket | Interchange |
| Strafford | Dover | 102.525 | 164.998 | 6 | NH 16 north / Spaulding Turnpike north – Somersworth, Rochester, Conway | Western end of concurrency with NH 16. Full-access interchange opened on Friday, 15 November 2019. |
| Rockingham | Newington | 103.67 | 166.84 | 4 | Shattuck Way – Newington Village | |
| Rockingham | Newington | 104.20 | 167.69 | 3 | Woodbury Avenue | |
| Rockingham | Newington–Portsmouth line | 105.325 | 169.504 | 1 | Gosling Road (Pease Tradeport; Portsmouth Intl. Airport) | |
| Rockingham | Portsmouth | 106.83 | 171.93 | | I-95 / US 1 Byp. – Hampton, Boston, Portsmouth, Maine Points NH 16 ends / Spaulding Turnpike ends | Portsmouth Circle; eastern terminus; southern terminus of NH 16; exits 4-5 on I-95 |
1.000 mi = 1.609 km; 1.000 km = 0.621 mi: Concurrency terminus; Incomplete access

== Special routes ==
- US 4 Alt.: Andover to Boscawen
- US 4 Byp.: Concord
- US 4 Alt.: East Northwood to Dover

== Suffixed routes ==
New Hampshire Route 4A
- Location: Lebanon–Andover
- Length: 23.955 mi (38.552 km)

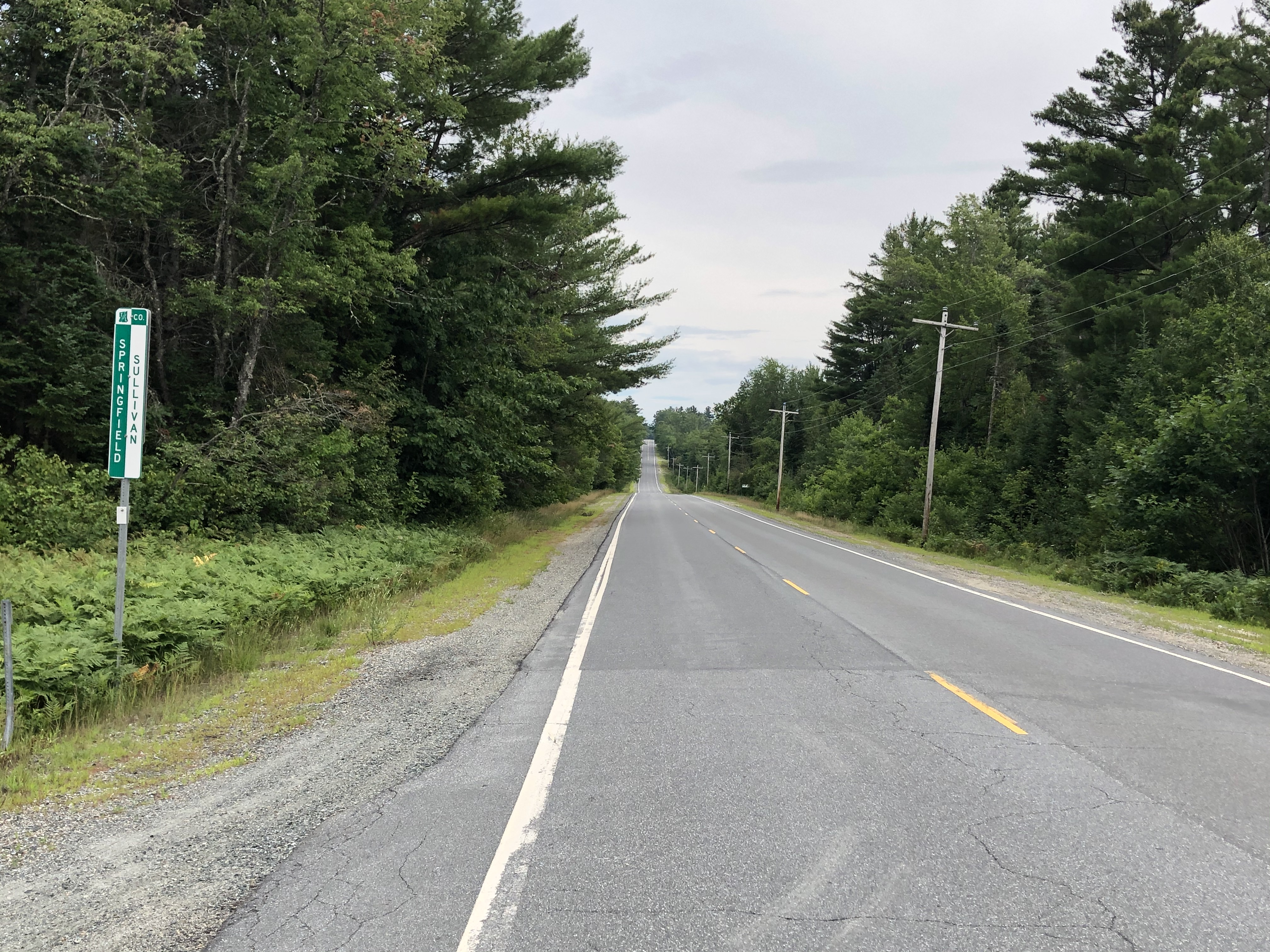
NH 4A entering Sullivan County

New Hampshire Route 4A (NH 4A) is a 24-mile-long (39 km) route between Lebanon and Andover, New Hampshire, serving as a shortcut around several villages on US 4. Until I-89 was built in the early 1970s, this was part of the main route between the Lebanon–Hanover area and the southeastern portion of New Hampshire. Today, traffic is very light on this road.

NH 4A is signed as a north–south highway, although its orientation is more southeast–northwest. The northern terminus is in Lebanon at US 4, near the western tip of Lake Mascoma. The southern terminus is in the town of Andover at NH 11, about 0.75 miles (1.21 km) southwest of its intersection with US 4. This highway is locally named the 4th New Hampshire Turnpike.

NH 4A is an alternate route of US 4, and not of NH 4, a completely different route located in Dover.

== See also ==
- New Hampshire Historical Marker No. 165: The Alexander Scammell Bridge over the Bellamy River
- New Hampshire Historical Marker No. 181: First New Hampshire Turnpike

U.S. Route 4
| Previous state: Vermont | New Hampshire | Next state: Terminus |
