= U.S. Route 3 =

North-south U.S. highway from Massachusetts to New Hampshire

U.S. Route 3
- US 3 highlighted in red and US 3 Bus. highlighted in blue

Route information
- Length: 277.90 mi (447.24 km)
- Existed: 1926–present

Major junctions
- South end: Route 2A / Route 3 in Cambridge, MA
- Route 2 / Route 16 in Cambridge, MA; I-95 / Route 128 / Route 3A in Burlington, MA; I-495 / Lowell Connector in Chelmsford, MA; NH 101A / Everett Turnpike in Nashua, NH; I-293 / Everett Turnpike / NH 101 near Manchester, NH; US 202 / US 4 in Concord, NH; I-93 in Franconia, NH; US 302 in Carroll, NH; US 2 in Lancaster, NH
- North end: R-257 at the Canadian border near Chartierville, QC

Location
- Country: United States
- States: Massachusetts, New Hampshire
- Counties: MA: Middlesex; NH: Hillsborough, Merrimack, Belknap, Grafton, Coös

Highway system
- United States Numbered Highway System; List; Special; Divided
- Massachusetts State Highway System; Interstate; US; State
- New Hampshire Highway System; Interstate; US; State; Turnpikes
← US 2	US	→ US 4
← Route 2A	MA	→ Route 3
← US 2	NH	→ NH 3A
← Route 5	N.E.	→ Route 6A

U.S. Route 3 (US 3) is a United States Numbered Highway running 277.90 miles (447.24 km) from Cambridge, Massachusetts, through New Hampshire, to the Canada–United States border near Third Connecticut Lake, where it connects to Quebec Route 257.

Massachusetts Route 3 connects to the southern terminus of US 3 in Cambridge and continues south to Cape Cod. Though it shares a number, it has never been part of US 3. Both routes, which connect end-to-end, are treated as a single 91.3-mile (146.9 km) state highway by the Massachusetts Department of Transportation (MassDOT). From Cambridge to Burlington, US 3 is routed on surface streets through the dense suburbs in the Greater Boston area. After a brief concurrency with Interstate 95 (I-95) and Route 128, the route follows its own freeway northwest, bypassing Lowell and entering New Hampshire at Nashua, becoming the Everett Turnpike.

In New Hampshire, current and former parts of US 3 are known as the Daniel Webster Highway. From Burlington, Massachusetts, to Nashua, New Hampshire, US 3 is a freeway. The segment in New Hampshire is a free portion of the Everett Turnpike, while the portion in Massachusetts is known as the Northwest Expressway. From where it leaves the Everett Turnpike in Nashua northward, US 3 is generally a two-to-four lane at-grade road, though there are two super-two freeway portions in northern New Hampshire, one on the Laconia Bypass, and one where US 3 and I-93 use the Franconia Notch Parkway. The route serves as a major local arterial, connecting many of the cities of the densely populated Merrimack Valley. North of the White Mountains, the route serves as one of the only north–south roads connecting the communities of the Great North Woods Region and has New Hampshire's only border crossing between the US and Canada.

== Route description ==
Lengths
	mi	km
MA	35.70	57.45
NH	241.953	389.386
Total	277.653	446.839

=== Massachusetts ===
==== Cambridge to Burlington ====
US 3 begins in the south along Memorial Drive in Cambridge, along the Charles River, at an interchange with Massachusetts Avenue (Route 2A). The road continues as southbound Route 3 toward Downtown Boston, while northbound US 3 heads west, then north along the river toward Harvard University, joining with Route 2 along the way. It runs along the north bank of the Charles River, opposite Soldiers Field Road in Allston along this stretch. Passing south of Harvard Square, US 3 and Route 2 transition onto the Fresh Pond Parkway and join Route 16. Near Alewife station, Route 2 splits off as a freeway to the west (Concord Turnpike), while US 3 and Route 16 stay on the Alewife Brook Parkway. Shortly thereafter, US 3 splits from the parkway (which continues as Route 16) and joins Route 2A (Massachusetts Avenue) westbound, crossing into Arlington. In the center of town, US 3 and Route 2A split from Massachusetts Avenue and overlap briefly with Route 60 before continuing along Mystic Street. Route 2A splits from US 3 just to the north. US 3 continues through parts of Winchester and Woburn without any major intersections before entering Burlington and interchanging with I-95 and Route 128 (Yankee Division Highway) at exit 51A. US 3 joins the freeway to connect with the Northwest Expressway, while its historic surface alignment continues as Route 3A.

==== Burlington to Tyngsborough (Northwest Expressway) ====
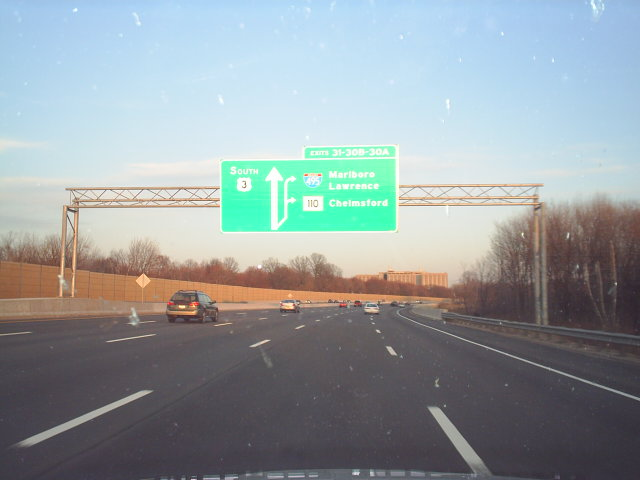
Signage on US Route 3, approaching the intersection with Interstate 495 and Massachusetts Route 110 in Chelmsford

US 3 runs along 1.6 miles (2.6 km) of I-95 (Route 128) in a wrong-way concurrency before exiting at exit 50A onto its own freeway, the Northwest Expressway.

Originally built in the 1950s, before the cancelation of the Inner Belt, the US 3 freeway was to have extended into metro Boston before being truncated to I-95. Consequently, a partially completed cloverleaf interchange connects US 3 to I-95. Exit numbers on the US 3 freeway start at milemarker 72 since Route 3 and US 3 are counted as one highway by MassDOT.

The freeway closely parallels Route 3A, the historic alignment of US 3, along its entire 19-mile (31 km) length from Burlington to the New Hampshire state border. It passes through Billerica and into Chelmsford, where it connects with I-495 and the Lowell Connector, a freeway spur into downtown Lowell. Continuing north, the freeway briefly enters Lowell, then passes through North Chelmsford and Tyngsborough before crossing the state line into Nashua, New Hampshire. The freeway continues north as the Everett Turnpike.

The Burlington to Tyngsborough area maintains a 501(c)(6) nonprofit representative entity known as the Middlesex 3 Coalition and its affiliate agency the Middlesex 3 TMA, which provides collaborative support to businesses and individuals within the jurisdiction to build consensus on transportation and developmental needs.

=== New Hampshire ===
US 3 passes through most of the state's major cities and towns and is the only highway to extend from the Massachusetts state border in the south to the Canadian border in the north. Running for 242 miles (389 km) in New Hampshire, US 3 is by far the longest signed highway in the state. For much of its routing, US 3 closely parallels I-93, serving as a local route to the freeway.

==== Everett Turnpike (Nashua) ====
US 3 crosses the state border into Nashua and immediately becomes concurrent with the Everett Turnpike, running on the freeway for 6.7 miles (10.8 km) along the western side of the city.

==== Daniel Webster Highway, local roads, and NH 28 concurrency (Nashua – Suncook) ====
US 3 leaves the Everett Turnpike at exit 7E, crosses New Hampshire Route 101A (NH 101A) and turns northeast for approximately 1.5 miles (2.4 km) along a segment known as the Henri Burque Highway, before turning north onto Concord Street, which soon becomes known as the Daniel Webster Highway. (Some locals erroneously refer to the Everett Turnpike from exit 7 through the I-293 interchange as US 3 and refer to the actual US 3 only as the Daniel Webster Highway or "Old Route 3".)

US 3 continues north through the town of Merrimack and into Bedford, where it becomes South River Road. The highway parallels I-293 until it turns east in Manchester and then crosses the Merrimack River on Queen City Avenue, just after its intersection with I-293/NH 3A and NH 114A. US 3 and NH 3A are signed in a wrong-way concurrency for approximately 0.6 miles (0.97 km) before US 3 turns north onto Elm Street toward downtown Manchester. After approximately 2.2 miles (3.5 km), US 3 turns east onto Webster Street, then joins NH 28 to proceed in a northeasterly direction toward Hooksett, interchanging with I-93. The two routes continue as Hooksett Road, then the Daniel Webster Highway.

==== In Concord ====
In Suncook, NH 28 leaves to the northeast, and US 3 proceeds northwest toward Concord on Pembroke Street, becoming Manchester Street when it enters the Concord city limits. After crossing the Merrimack River and interchanging with I-93, US 3 intersects NH 3A (South Main Street), which terminates at its parent route. US 3 traverses downtown Concord as North and South Main streets (briefly overlapping with US 202 and NH 9), then follows North State Street to Fisherville Road to Village Street in Penacook before crossing the Contoocook River into Boscawen.

==== Further north (Boscawen – Lincoln) ====
US 3 travels north through Boscawen, briefly overlapping with US 4. The highway parallels the Merrimack River north into Franklin, where the highway meets NH 11. US 3 joins NH 11 and turns east; NH 3A also resumes at this intersection, continuing north. US 3 and NH 11 briefly form a three-route concurrency with NH 127 in Franklin, then pass through Tilton, crossing NH 132 and passing the western end of NH 140. Continuing northeast past Lake Winnisquam, US 3 and NH 11 reach Laconia and turn onto the Laconia–Gilford Bypass, intersecting with NH 106, NH 107, and NH 11A. At the northern end of the bypass, US 3 and NH 11 split after a 17.3-mile (27.8 km) overlap, with the U.S. Route continuing north on Lake Street to Weirs Beach and an intersection with NH 11B. US 3 continues north as the Daniel Webster Highway to Meredith at the northern end of Meredith Bay on Lake Winnipesaukee. In Meredith, US 3 intersects the northern terminus of NH 106, then joins NH 25 and continues north past Squam Lake into Holderness, passing the western terminuses of NH 25B and NH 113. Through Holderness, US 3 and NH 25 gradually turn west, then southwest, passing the southern end of NH 175 and then reaching the northern end of NH 132 in Ashland.

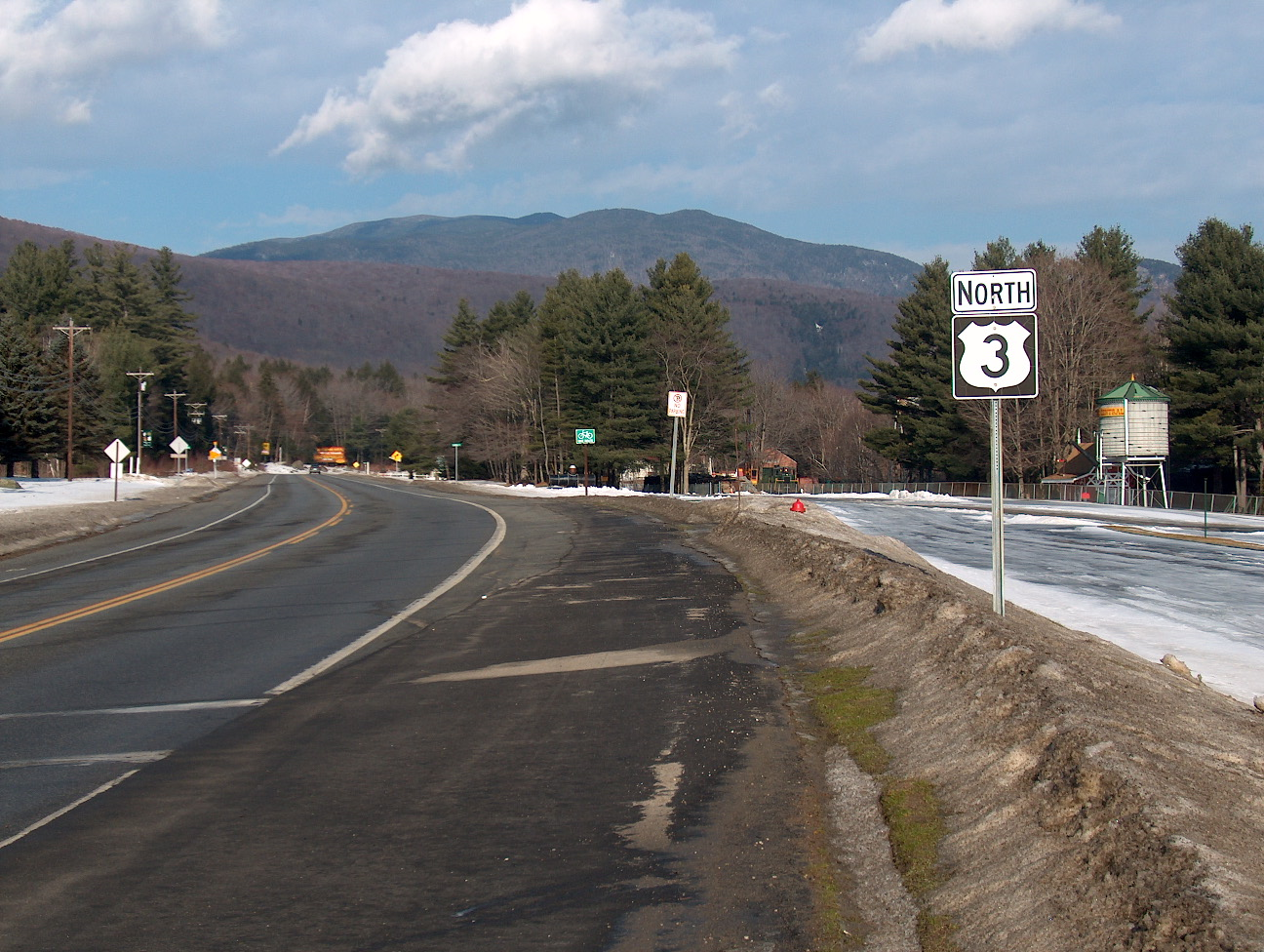
US 3 in Lincoln, New Hampshire

From Ashland to North Woodstock, US 3 proceeds north, roughly paralleling I-93 in the Pemigewasset River valley. Along this stretch it passes through the towns of Plymouth (NH 25 splits from US 3 near I-93 in Plymouth, which also marks the true northern terminus of NH 3A), West Campton (where it meets the western end of NH 49, the principal access road to Waterville Valley), Thornton, and Woodstock. In North Woodstock, US 3 crosses NH 112 (known to the east as the Kancamagus Highway).

==== Interstate 93 concurrency through the Franconia Notch State Park (Lincoln – Franconia) ====
Continuing north, US 3 joins with I-93 as it passes through Franconia Notch State Park, one of the more scenic drives in the White Mountains. This stretch of freeway is known as the Franconia Notch Parkway and is a rare section of Interstate Highway with only one lane in each direction.

==== Northernmost end (Franconia – Pittsburg) ====
US 3 separates from I-93 at exit 35, shortly north of the northern park boundary in Franconia. From there, NH 141 branches northwest and US 3 heads north and east toward Twin Mountain and a junction with US 302. This portion of the road is noted for fairly frequent moose sightings, especially during sunrise and sunset when moose are particularly active.

Heading north from Twin Mountain, US 3 passes through the village of Carroll, where NH 115 branches to the northeast and US 3 bears to the northwest and the town of Whitefield. In the center of Whitefield, NH 142 branches to the northwest and NH 116 crosses, running roughly southwest to northeast. US 3 continues north to Lancaster, where it joins US 2 in the town center, and where NH 135 branches off to the west. After US 2 leaves to the west, US 3 continues north, roughly paralleling the course of the Connecticut River (which also forms the border with Vermont), through Northumberland and Groveton, where NH 110 ends. North of Groveton, US 3 continues to follow the river, through Stratford, North Stratford, and Columbia, until it reaches Colebrook, where it crosses NH 26 and meets the southern terminus of NH 145. Still following the Connecticut River north, US 3 passes through portions of Stewartstown and Clarksville. In Stewartstown, the road turns more directly east (still following the Connecticut River, which is no longer a boundary), before resuming a northeasterly direction through Pittsburg. Its last major intersection is at the northern terminus of NH 145. US 3 continues north for another 22 miles (35 km), eventually reaching the Pittsburg–Chartierville Border Crossing, where the road crosses into Chartierville, Quebec, and becomes Quebec Route 257.

In total, US 3 runs along the Connecticut River and its source lakes for approximately 70 miles (110 km). Sections of US 3 in Colebrook are named after Scott E. Phillips and Leslie G. Lord, members of the New Hampshire State Police killed in the line of duty on August 19, 1997.

== History ==
=== New England route ===

Before the establishment of the U.S. Numbered Highway System, the section of US 3 and Route 3 from Orleans, Massachusetts, to Colebrook, New Hampshire, was part of the New England road marking system as New England Route 6. It was replaced in its entirety with the establishment of US 3 and Route 3 in 1926.

=== Massachusetts ===
US 3 in Massachusetts closely follows the route of the early 19th-century Middlesex Canal and Middlesex Turnpike.

The modern Northwest Expressway was begun near Route 110 in Lowell before World War II. In the 1950s, it was extended south to Route 128 (later overlapped by I-95), and, by the 1960s, it was completed north from Chelmsford to New Hampshire. By 2005, the chronically congested four-lane road, largely with antiquated ramps around Lowell, was widened to six lanes (as it had been in Nashua, New Hampshire, a few years prior) with a breakdown lane on both the left and right sides of the road, and many interchanges were modernized in what was comically known as "The Big Wide", in reference to Massachusetts' other "Big" construction project (the Big Dig). The roadbed and bridges were built to support a fourth lane in each travel direction for future expansion. The $365-million (equivalent to $562 million in 2024), 21-mile (34 km) widening project was completed in 2005 from Burlington to the New Hampshire border.

The final section of the expressway was planned for inner suburban towns northwest of Boston. The expressway was to supply a new route for US 3, between Route 128 and the canceled I-695 (Inner Belt). This was one of the expressway projects canceled in Governor Francis Sargent's 1970 moratorium on expressway construction within Route 128. The latter section of the expressway was a key component of the "Master Plan Highway Plan for Metropolitan Boston". The highway would have traveled through Lexington, Arlington, Medford, Somerville, and Cambridge, before linking with the Inner Belt Expressway.

The original plan called for US 3 and Route 2 to link up at the Lexington–Arlington border and continue southeasterly, crossing Route 16/Mystic Valley Parkway at the Arlington–Somerville border and proceeding into Cambridge toward Union Square, Somerville. A 1962 plan called for Route 2 and US 3 to converge at Alewife Brook Parkway with a longer stretch of new highway for US 3 paralleling Lowell Street in Lexington and Summer Street in Arlington.

Exit numbers along the Northwest Expressway section in Massachusetts were to be changed to mileage based numbers under a project to start in 2016, but that project was postponed. In November 2019, the MassDOT announced it would be proceeding with the project in 2020.

== Termini ==
According to the American Association of State Highway and Transportation Officials (AASHTO) route log, the southern terminus of US 3 is at the junction of Route 2A and Route 3 in Cambridge, which is where Route 2A crosses the Charles along the Harvard Bridge (also known as the Massachusetts Avenue Bridge). This is a change from AASHTO's 1989 Route Log which placed the terminus at US 20 in Boston, where Route 2 currently meets US 20 after crossing the Charles River at the Boston University Bridge. This was where US 3 met US 1 until that highway was rerouted in 1971.

The original northern terminus of US 3 (in 1926) was at Colebrook, New Hampshire, but the highway was extended to West Stewartstown in 1928 and to Pittsburg in 1937. Colebrook was the northern terminus again from 1939 to 1940. Since 1940, the highway has run through Pittsburg to the Pittsburg–Chartierville Border Crossing.

== Major intersections ==
Although MassDOT inventories Route 3 and US 3 as one continuous route, this table includes the mileage only for US 3 starting from its southern terminus in Cambridge.

State	County	Location	mi	km	Old exit	New exit	Destinations	Notes
Massachusetts	Middlesex	Cambridge	0.000	0.000			Route 3 south (Memorial Drive) – Boston	Continuation south
Massachusetts	Middlesex	Cambridge	0.000	0.000			Route 2A (Massachusetts Avenue / Harvard Bridge) – Cambridge, Roxbury	Diamond interchange; no southbound access to Route 2A west
Massachusetts	Middlesex	Cambridge	1.047	1.685			Route 2 east (Boston University Bridge) – Cambridgeport, Brookline	Roundabout interchange; south end of concurrency with Route 2
Massachusetts	Middlesex	Cambridge	3.975	6.397			Route 16 west (Huron Avenue) – Watertown, West Newton	South end of concurrency with Route 16
Massachusetts	Middlesex	Cambridge	5.444	8.761			Route 2 west (Concord Turnpike) – Concord	North end of concurrency with Route 2
Massachusetts	Middlesex	Cambridge	5.820	9.366			Route 2A east (Massachusetts Avenue) / Route 16 east / Alewife Brook Parkway – Medford, Harvard Square, Cambridge	North end of concurrency with Route 16; south end of concurrency with Route 2A
Massachusetts	Middlesex	Arlington	7.198	11.584			Route 60 west (Pleasant Street) – Belmont	South end of concurrency with Route 60
Massachusetts	Middlesex	Arlington	7.283	11.721			Route 60 east (Chestnut Street) – Medford, Malden	North end of concurrency with Route 60
Massachusetts	Middlesex	Arlington	7.457	12.001			Route 2A west (Summer Street) / Mystic Valley Parkway – Lexington, Concord	North end of concurrency with Route 2A
Massachusetts	Middlesex	Burlington	13.442	21.633	Southern end of freeway section			
Massachusetts	Middlesex	Burlington	13.442	21.633	33	51	I-95 north (Route 128 north) / Route 3A north – Burlington, Peabody, Portsmouth, NH	South end of wrong-way concurrency with I-95/Route 128; signed as exits 51A (I-95) and 51B (Route 3A)
Massachusetts	Middlesex	Burlington	14.874	23.937	32B	50B	Middlesex Turnpike – Burlington	
Massachusetts	Middlesex	Burlington	15.136	24.359	32A (NB); 25B (SB)	50A (NB); 72B (SB)	I-95 south / Route 128 south – Waltham, Providence, RI	North end of wrong-way concurrency with I-95/Route 128; Route 128 not signed northbound
Massachusetts	Middlesex	Bedford	17.646	28.398	26	73	Route 62 – Burlington, Bedford	
Massachusetts	Middlesex	Billerica	21.167	34.065	27	76	Concord Road – Billerica, Bedford	
Massachusetts	Middlesex	Billerica	22.591	36.357	28	78	Treble Cove Road – North Billerica, Carlisle	
Massachusetts	Middlesex	Chelmsford	24.691	39.736	29	79	Route 129 to Route 3A – Billerica, Chelmsford	To Route 4, Route 110 and Route 27
Massachusetts	Middlesex	Chelmsford	25.554	41.125	30B	80	Lowell Connector north to I-495 north – Lawrence	Northbound exit and southbound entrance; southern terminus and exit 1A on Lowell Connector
Massachusetts	Middlesex	Chelmsford	25.554– 26.108	41.125– 42.017	30	81	I-495 / Lowell Connector north – Marlboro, Lawrence	Signed as exits 81A (north) and 81B (south); no northbound access to I-495 north/Lowell; Lowell Connector not signed
Massachusetts	Middlesex	Chelmsford	26.571	42.762	31	81C	Route 110 – Chelmsford, Lowell	
Massachusetts	Middlesex	Chelmsford	28.762	46.288	32	84	Route 4 (North Road) – North Chelmsford, Chelmsford	
Massachusetts	Middlesex	Chelmsford	30.819	49.598	33	86	Route 40 – Westford, North Chelmsford	
Massachusetts	Middlesex	Tyngsborough	33.029	53.155	34	88	Westford Road – Tyngsborough, Westford	
Massachusetts	Middlesex	Tyngsborough	34.644	55.754	35	90	Route 113 – Dunstable, Tyngsborough	
Massachusetts– New Hampshire line	Middlesex– Hillsborough county line	Tyngsborough– Nashua line	36.104 0.000	58.104 0.000	36	91	Middlesex Road – Tyngsborough; Daniel Webster Highway — South Nashua NH	No southbound exit; northbound entrance extends into New Hampshire, where it merges with exit 1
Massachusetts– New Hampshire line	Middlesex– Hillsborough county line	Tyngsborough– Nashua line	36.104 0.000	58.104 0.000	Transition between Northwest Expressway and Everett Turnpike			
New Hampshire	Hillsborough	Nashua	0.834	1.342		1	Spit Brook Road – South Nashua	
New Hampshire	Hillsborough	Nashua	1.553	2.499		2	To NH 3A / Daniel Webster Highway – Hudson	Access via Circumferential Highway; signed as exit 1A from northbound collector-distributor lane
New Hampshire	Hillsborough	Nashua	2.819	4.537		3	Daniel Webster Highway – South Nashua	Southbound left exit and northbound entrance
New Hampshire	Hillsborough	Nashua	3.055	4.917		4	East Dunstable Road	FAA Center signage was removed at the request of the FAA shortly after 9/11
New Hampshire	Hillsborough	Nashua	4.724	7.603		5	NH 111 / NH 111A west – Nashua, Hudson, Pepperell, MA	Signed as exits 5E (east) and 5W (west)
New Hampshire	Hillsborough	Nashua	5.059	8.142		5A	Simon Street	Northbound exit only
New Hampshire	Hillsborough	Nashua	6.285	10.115		6	NH 130 (Broad Street) – Nashua, Hollis, Brookline	
New Hampshire	Hillsborough	Nashua	6.781	10.913		7	NH 101A / Everett Turnpike north – Manchester, Concord, Nashua Downtown, Amherst, Milford	Signed as exits 7E (east) and 7W (north/west); northern end of concurrency with Everett Turnpike
New Hampshire	Hillsborough	Nashua	6.781	10.913	Northern end of freeway section			
New Hampshire	Hillsborough	Merrimack	10.832	17.432			To Everett Turnpike	Access via Industrial Drive
New Hampshire	Hillsborough	Merrimack	12.109	19.488			Everett Turnpike – Concord, Boston	Exit 11 on Everett Turnpike; access via Greeley Street
New Hampshire	Hillsborough	Merrimack	15.745	25.339			Everett Turnpike south	Exit 12 on Everett Turnpike; access via Bedford Road
New Hampshire	Hillsborough	Bedford	17.874– 18.148	28.765– 29.206			Everett Turnpike to NH 3A – Manchester Airport, Litchfield, Concord, Nashua	Exit 13 on Everett Turnpike; access via Raymond Wieczorek Drive
New Hampshire	Hillsborough	Bedford	20.900	33.635			I-293 / Everett Turnpike / NH 101 east – Boston, Concord, Manchester Airport	
New Hampshire	Hillsborough	Bedford	21.331	34.329			To NH 101 west / NH 114 – Bedford Ctr., Milford	Access via Kilton Road
New Hampshire	Hillsborough	Manchester	22.690	36.516			I-293 (Everett Turnpike) / NH 3A north / NH 114A west – Concord, Boston	Exit 4 on I-293; eastern terminus of NH 114A; southern terminus of wrong-way concurrency with NH 3A
New Hampshire	Hillsborough	Manchester	23.333	37.551			NH 3A south (South Elm Street)	Northern end of wrong-way concurrency with NH 3A
New Hampshire	Hillsborough	Manchester	25.974	41.801			NH 28 south (Beech Street / Maple Street)	Southern end of concurrency with NH 28
New Hampshire	Merrimack	Hooksett	26.998– 27.591	43.449– 44.403			I-93 to NH 101 – Salem, Boston, Concord, Plymouth	Exit 9 on I-93
New Hampshire	Merrimack	Hooksett	28.586	46.005			NH 28A south (Mammoth Road) – Londonderry	Northern terminus of NH 28A
New Hampshire	Merrimack	Hooksett	29.082	46.803			NH 27 east – Candia, Raymond	Western terminus of NH 27
New Hampshire	Merrimack	Hooksett	29.578	47.601			NH 28 Bypass south – Derry	Northern terminus of NH 28 Bypass
New Hampshire	Merrimack	Allenstown	35.237	56.708			NH 28 north – Epsom, Alton	Northern end of concurrency with NH 28
New Hampshire	Merrimack	Pembroke	39.506	63.579			NH 106 north – Loudon, Laconia	Southern terminus of NH 106
New Hampshire	Merrimack	Concord	41.704	67.116	Korean Veterans Memorial Bridge over the Merrimack River			
New Hampshire	Merrimack	Concord	41.775– 41.933	67.230– 67.485			I-93 (Everett Turnpike) to I-89 north / I-393 east – Manchester, Lebanon, Plymouth, Portsmouth	Exit 13 on I-93
New Hampshire	Merrimack	Concord	42.173	67.871			NH 3A south (Main Street)	Southern end of silent concurrency with NH 3A
New Hampshire	Merrimack	Concord	42.729	68.766			US 202 west / NH 9 west (Pleasant Street) to NH 13	Southern end of concurrency with US 202 / NH 9
New Hampshire	Merrimack	Concord	43.024	69.240			NH 9 east (Loudon Road) to I-93	Northern end of concurrency with NH 9
New Hampshire	Merrimack	Concord	43.411	69.863			US 202 east to I-393 east	Northern end of concurrency with US 202
New Hampshire	Merrimack	Boscawen	50.812	81.774			US 4 east to I-93 – Concord	Southern end of concurrency with US 4
New Hampshire	Merrimack	Boscawen	52.168	83.956			US 4 west – Salisbury, Andover	Northern end of concurrency with US 4
New Hampshire	Merrimack	Franklin	60.645	97.599			NH 127 south – Salisbury	Southern end of concurrency with NH 127
New Hampshire	Merrimack	Franklin	61.307	98.664			NH 3A north / NH 11 west – Andover, Bristol	Northern end of concurrency with NH 3A; southern end of concurrency with NH 11
New Hampshire	Merrimack	Franklin	61.755	99.385			NH 127 north – New Hampton	Northern end of concurrency with NH 127
New Hampshire	Belknap	Tilton	64.925	104.487			NH 132 south to I-93 south – Northfield, Concord	Southern end of concurrency with NH 132
New Hampshire	Belknap	Tilton	66.203– 66.586	106.543– 107.160			I-93 / NH 140 east – Canterbury, Concord, Boston, New Hampton, Plymouth, Belmont, Gilmanton	Exit 20 on I-93; western terminus of NH 140
New Hampshire	Belknap	Tilton	66.678	107.308			NH 132 north – Sanbornton	Northern end of concurrency with NH 132
New Hampshire	Belknap	Belmont	72.845	117.233			US 3 Bus. north / NH 11A east	Southern terminus of US 3 Business, western terminus of NH 11A
New Hampshire	Belknap	Laconia	74.355	119.663			NH 106 to NH 107 – Laconia, Belmont, Concord	Interchange; no southbound access to NH 106 north
New Hampshire	Belknap	Laconia	74.999	120.699			NH 107 – Laconia, Gilmanton	Interchange; southbound exit and northbound entrance
New Hampshire	Belknap	Gilford	76.040	122.375			NH 11A – Gilford, Laconia	Interchange
New Hampshire	Belknap	Gilford	78.649	126.573			NH 11 east – Alton	Northern end of concurrency with NH 11
New Hampshire	Belknap	Gilford–Laconia line	79.442	127.850			US 3 Bus. south (Union Avenue) / NH 107 south – Laconia	Northern terminus of US 3 Business and NH 107
New Hampshire	Belknap	Laconia	82.684	133.067			NH 11B south – Gilford, Alton Bay	Northern terminus of NH 11B
New Hampshire	Belknap	Meredith	86.334	138.941			NH 106 south – Laconia	Northern terminus of NH 106
New Hampshire	Belknap	Meredith	86.847	139.767			NH 104 west to I-93 – New Hampton	Eastern terminus of NH 104
New Hampshire	Belknap	Meredith	87.693	141.128			NH 25 east – Center Harbor, Ossipee, Conway	Southern end of concurrency with NH 25
New Hampshire	Belknap	Center Harbor	90.778	146.093			NH 25B east – Center Harbor	Western terminus of NH 25B
New Hampshire	Grafton	Holderness	95.526	153.734			NH 113 east – Sandwich	Western terminus of NH 113
New Hampshire	Grafton	Holderness	96.661	155.561			NH 175 north – Campton	Southern terminus of NH 175
New Hampshire	Grafton	Ashland	99.271	159.761			NH 132 south – New Hampton, Tilton	Northern terminus of NH 132
New Hampshire	Grafton	Ashland	99.958– 100.339	160.867– 161.480			I-93 – Tilton, Concord, Plymouth, Campton	Exit 24 on I-93
New Hampshire	Grafton	Plymouth	105.397	169.620			NH 175A east to I-93 – Holderness	Western terminus of NH 175A
New Hampshire	Grafton	Plymouth	106.202	170.916			NH 3A south / NH 25 west to I-93 – Rumney, Bristol, Concord, Littleton	Interchange; northern end of concurrency with NH 25; northern terminus of NH 3A
New Hampshire	Grafton	Campton	109.525	176.263			I-93 – Campton, Littleton, Plymouth, Concord	Access via Blair Road; exit 27 on I-93
New Hampshire	Grafton	Campton	112.375	180.850			NH 49 east to I-93 – Campton, Waterville Valley	Western terminus of NH 49
New Hampshire	Grafton	Thornton	113.804– 114.101	183.150– 183.628			I-93 – Plymouth, Concord, Franconia, Littleton	Exit 29 on I-93
New Hampshire	Grafton	Woodstock	120.410– 120.910	193.781– 194.586			I-93 – Franconia, Littleton, St. Johnsbury, VT, Plymouth, Concord	Exit 30 on I-93
New Hampshire	Grafton	Woodstock	125.420	201.844			NH 175 south – Campton	Northern terminus of NH 175
New Hampshire	Grafton	Woodstock	126.031	202.827			NH 112 to I-93 – Lincoln, Conway, Woodsville	
New Hampshire	Grafton	Lincoln	128.210– 128.394	206.334– 206.630			I-93 – Concord, Littleton	Exit 33 on I-93
New Hampshire	Grafton	Lincoln	131.562	211.729		34A	I-93 south	Southbound exit only; southern end of concurrency with I-93
New Hampshire	Grafton	Franconia	135.923	218.747		34B	Cannon Mountain Tramway – Old Man Historic Site	
New Hampshire	Grafton	Franconia	136.623	219.873		34C	NH 18 north – Echo Lake Beach, Peabody Slopes, Cannon Mountain, South Franconia	Southern terminus of NH 18
New Hampshire	Grafton	Franconia	138.080	222.218		35	I-93 north to I-91 / US 5	Northbound exit only; northern end of concurrency with I-93
New Hampshire	Grafton	Franconia	139.044	223.770			NH 141 west to I-93 north – Franconia	Eastern terminus of NH 141
New Hampshire	Coos	Carroll	148.497	238.983			US 302 – Bethlehem, Bretton Woods, Conway	Village of Twin Mountain
New Hampshire	Coos	Carroll	150.510	242.222			NH 115 north – Jefferson, Berlin, Gorham	Southern terminus of NH 115
New Hampshire	Coos	Whitefield	156.871	252.459			NH 116 south / NH 142 south – Bethlehem, Littleton	Southern end of concurrency with NH 116 / NH 142
New Hampshire	Coos	Whitefield	156.918	252.535			NH 142 north – Dalton	Northern end of concurrency with NH 142
New Hampshire	Coos	Whitefield	156.959	252.601			NH 116 north – Jefferson, Gorham	Northern end of concurrency with NH 116
New Hampshire	Coos	Lancaster	165.330	266.073			US 2 east – Jefferson, Gorham, Berlin	Southern end of concurrency with US 2
New Hampshire	Coos	Lancaster	165.372	266.140			NH 135 south – Dalton, Gilman VT	Northern terminus of NH 135
New Hampshire	Coos	Lancaster	166.126	267.354			US 2 west – Vermont	Northern end of concurrency with US 2
New Hampshire	Coos	Northumberland	175.152	281.880			NH 110 east – Stark, Berlin	Western terminus of NH 110; village of Groveton
New Hampshire	Coos	North Stratford	188.576	303.484			To VT 105 west – Bloomfield VT	Access via Bridge Street
New Hampshire	Coos	Colebrook	201.458	324.215			NH 26 east – Dixville Notch	Southern end of concurrency with NH 26
New Hampshire	Coos	Colebrook	201.565	324.387			NH 26 west (Bridge Street)	Northern end of concurrency with NH 26
New Hampshire	Coos	Colebrook	201.647	324.519			NH 145 north – Clarksville	Southern terminus of NH 145
New Hampshire	Coos	Pittsburg	219.573	353.368			NH 145 south – Colebrook	Northern terminus of NH 145
New Hampshire	Coos	Pittsburg	241.953	389.386			R-257 north	Continuation into Quebec
1.000 mi = 1.609 km; 1.000 km = 0.621 mi: Concurrency terminus; Incomplete access; Route transition

== Special routes ==
US 3 has one existing special route, a business route through Laconia, New Hampshire. Four other special routes may have existed in the past: an alternate and business route between Tyngsborough, Massachusetts, and Concord, New Hampshire, and bypass routes around Concord and Nashua, New Hampshire.

=== Tyngsborough–Concord alternate route ===
U.S. Route 3 Alternate
- Location: Tyngsborough, Massachusetts–Concord, New Hampshire

=== Tyngsborough–Concord business route ===
U.S. Route 3 Business
- Location: Tyngsborough, Massachusetts–Concord, New Hampshire

=== Concord bypass route ===
U.S. Route 3 Bypass
- Location: Concord, New Hampshire

=== Nashua bypass route ===
U.S. Route 3 Bypass
- Location: Nashua, New Hampshire

=== Laconia business loop ===
U.S. Route 3 Business
- Location: Belmont–Laconia, New Hampshire
- Length: 4.144 mi (6.669 km)

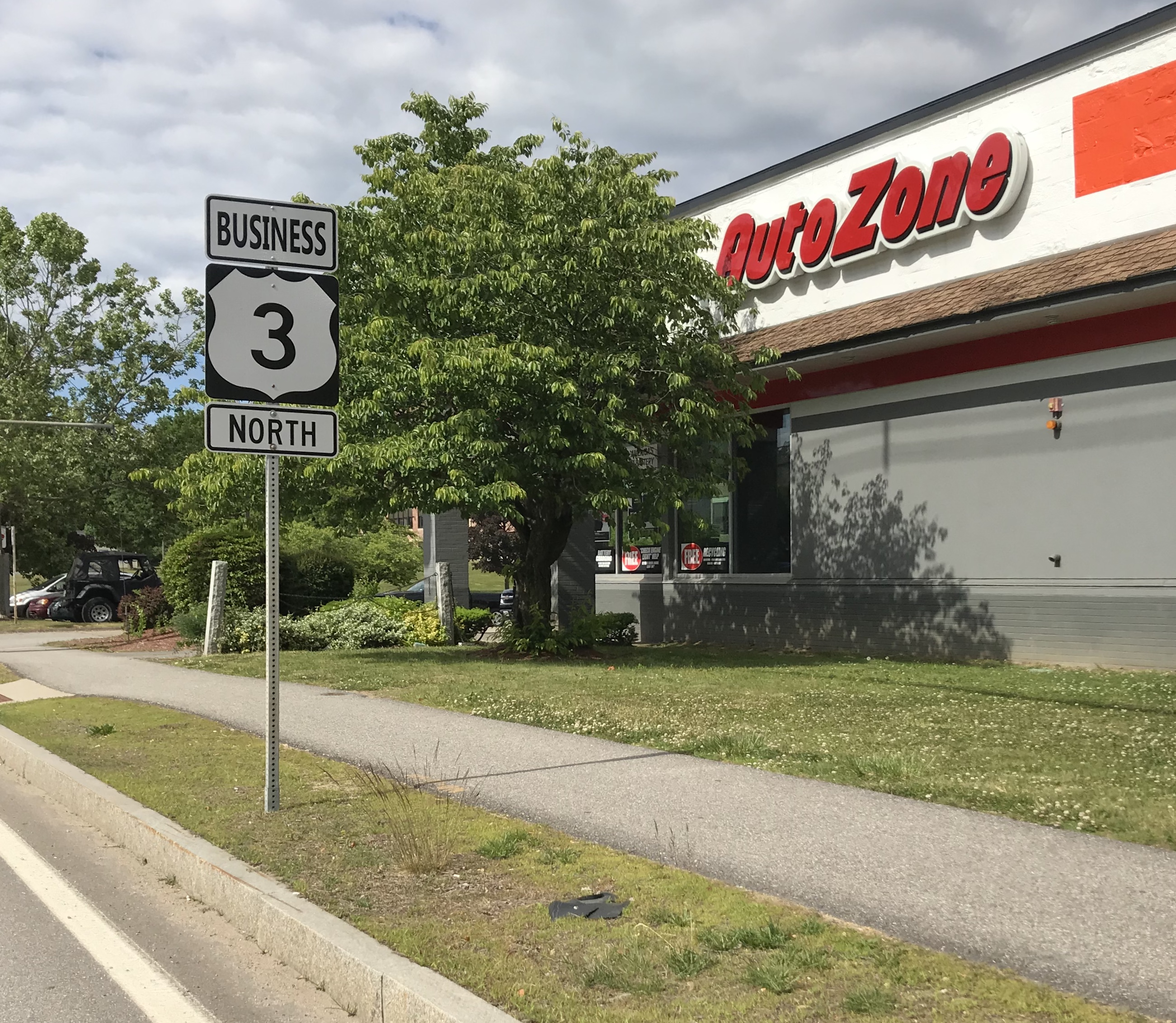
US 3 Bus. sign

U.S. Route 3 Business (US 3 Bus.) is a 4.144-mile-long (6.669 km) signed business route running north–south through downtown Laconia, New Hampshire. It runs from US 3 and NH 11 in Belmont north to US 3 in Laconia, along NH 107 and NH 11A. It is a former alignment of US 3, used before the Laconia–Gilford bypass was built.

== See also ==
Browse numbered routes
← Route 2A	MA	→ Route 3
← US 2	NH	→ NH 3A
← Route 5	N.E.	→ Route 6A
