= Massachusetts Route 4 =

State highway in Middlesex County, Massachusetts, US

Route 4
- Route 4 highlighted in red

Route information
- Maintained by MassDOT
- Length: 18.2619 mi (29.3897 km)
- Existed: c. 1930–present

Major junctions
- South end: Route 2 in Lexington
- I-95 / Route 128 in Lexington; I-495 / US 3 in Chelmsford
- North end: Route 3A in North Chelmsford

Location
- Country: United States
- State: Massachusetts
- Counties: Middlesex

Highway system
- Massachusetts State Highway System; Interstate; US; State
← Route 3B	→ US 5

Route 4 is an 18.26-mile-long (29.39 km) state highway in northeastern Massachusetts. It runs south to north, serving many of Boston's western and northwestern suburbs, from an interchange with Route 2 in Lexington northwest to an intersection with Route 3A in North Chelmsford. Much of it, north of Lexington, runs parallel to U.S. Route 3 (the Northwest Expressway). The entire route is contained within Middlesex County.

== Route description ==
=== Concurrency with Route 225 ===
Route 4 begins at Route 2's Exit 131 interchange in Lexington, just west of the border with Arlington. This interchange also serves as Route 225's eastern terminus, and the two routes begin overlapped with one another. Routes 4 and 225 proceed northward on Watertown Street, turning onto Massachusetts Avenue and meeting Route 2A in East Lexington, briefly sharing pavement with it. The two routes continue through the center of Lexington, where Mass Ave splits to the west, and Routes 4 and 225 continue northwest on Bedford Street. The concurrency passes near North Lexington and interchanges with Interstate 95 (Route 128) at Exit 49, before continuing northwest into the town of Bedford. Routes 4 and 225 pass into the center of town, meeting Route 62 and running concurrent through the town center. After passing through town, Route 62 splits to the west, while Routes 4 and 225 turn northward, splitting themselves soon thereafter; Route 225 to the northwest and Route 4 to the north.

=== Northern segment ===
Route 4 proceeds northward out of Bedford by itself, where it begins to parallel US 3 as it passes into Billerica. Route 4 does not intersect any other numbered highways in the town, but does intersect two local roads - Concord Road and Treble Cove Road - which provide nearby access to US 3, which lies to the east. Route 4 continues north into Chelmsford, where it meanders towards the center of town. Near the center, Route 4 intersects the northern end of Route 27 at a rotary-type intersection, and then crosses Route 110, very briefly sharing pavement. Continuing to the north, Route 4 has a half-interchange with Interstate 495 at Exit 87. This interchange provides southbound-only access to I-495 and is a northbound-only exit from the freeway. Access to I-495 northbound is available via Route 110 East, at the nearby Exit 88 interchange. Route 4 continues to the northwest, where it comes to a rotary interchange with US 3 at Exit 84, crossing over the freeway, and continuing another half-mile to the northwest where it ends at an intersection with Route 3A in North Chelmsford.

== Major intersections ==
The entire route is in Middlesex County.

Location	mi	km	Destinations	Notes
Lexington	0.00	0.00	Route 2 (Concord Turnpike) – Cambridge, Boston, Concord, Fitchburg Route 225 begins	Southern terminus; eastern terminus of Route 225; exit 131 on Route 2; partial cloverleaf interchange
Lexington	1.40	2.25	Route 2A east – Arlington	Southern terminus of concurrency with Route 2A
Lexington	1.50	2.41	Route 2A west – Concord	Northern terminus of concurrency with Route 2A
Lexington	4.40	7.08	I-95 / Route 128 – Providence, RI, Peabody, Portsmouth, NH	Exits 49A-B on I-95; cloverleaf interchange
Bedford	6.20	9.98	Route 62 east – Burlington, Wilmington	Southern terminus of concurrency with Route 62
Bedford	7.20	11.59	Route 62 west – Concord, Maynard	Northern terminus of concurrency with Route 62
Bedford	7.40	11.91	Route 225 west – Carlisle	Northern terminus of concurrency with Route 225
Concord River			John F. Leary Bridge	
Chelmsford	15.50	24.94	Route 27 south – Acton, Maynard	Traffic circle; northern terminus of Route 27
Chelmsford	15.60	25.11	Route 110 / Route 129 east to US 3 / I-495 north – Lowell, Littleton, Billerica, Lawrence, Haverhill	Central Square; Western terminus of Route 129
Chelmsford	16.00	25.75	I-495 south – Marlboro, Taunton	Exit 87 on I-495; partial diamond interchange
Chelmsford	17.50	28.16	US 3 / Old Westford Road / Drum Hill Road – Boston, Nashua	Exit 84 on US 3; rotary interchange
North Chelmsford	18.26	29.39	Route 3A – Lowell, Billerica, Tyngsboro	Northern terminus
1.000 mi = 1.609 km; 1.000 km = 0.621 mi: Concurrency terminus

=== Street names ===
Route 4 is known by the following street names:

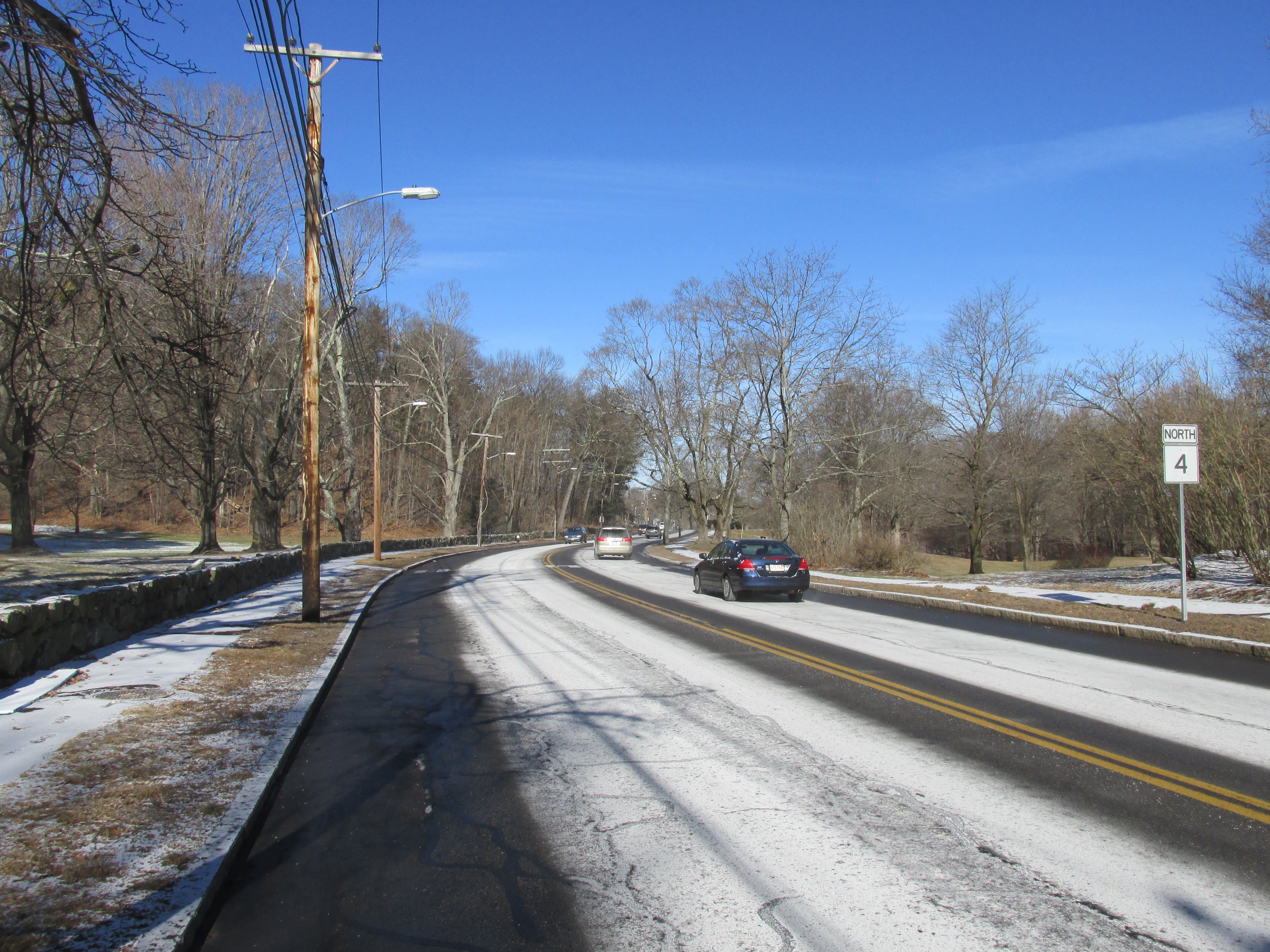
Massachusetts Avenue in Lexington

Lexington

- Watertown Street (concurrent with Route 225)
- Pleasant Street (concurrent with Route 225)
- Massachusetts Avenue (concurrent with Route 225)
- Bedford Street (concurrent with Route 225)

Bedford

- Great Road (concurrent with Route 225, partly with Route 62)
- North Road
- Chelmsford Road

Billerica

- Nashua Road

Chelmsford

- Boston Road
- North Road

North Chelmsford

- North Road
