= New Hampton (CDP), New Hampshire =

Census-designated place in New Hampshire, United States

New Hampton, New Hampshire
- Census-designated place
- Location within New Hampshire Location within the United States
- Coordinates: 43°36′36″N 71°39′05″W
- Country: United States
- State: New Hampshire
- County: Belknap
- Town: New Hampton

Area
  - Total: 1.37 sq mi (3.54 km^{2})
  - Land: 1.27 sq mi (3.29 km^{2})
  - Water: 0.097 sq mi (0.25 km^{2})
- Elevation: 627 ft (191 m)

Population (2020)
  - Total: 373
  - Density: 293.3/sq mi (113.26/km^{2})
- Time zone: UTC-5 (Eastern (EST))
  - Summer (DST): UTC-4 (EDT)
- ZIP code: 03256
- Area code: 603
- FIPS code: 33-51460
- GNIS feature ID: 2629732

New Hampton is a census-designated place (CDP) and the main village in the town of New Hampton, New Hampshire, United States. The population was 373 at the 2020 census, out of 2,377 people in the entire town of New Hampton.

== Geography ==
The CDP is near the geographic center of the town of New Hampton, and is bordered to the north by the Pemigewasset River and to the east by Interstate 93. To the south the CDP border follows unnamed brooks through the New Hampton Fish Hatchery, running south (upstream) to Gordon Hill Road, then turns north down another unnamed brook to the main (unnamed) stream through the village, following it downstream to the Pemigewasset. The CDP includes the campus of New Hampton School, a private college preparatory high school.

Interstate 93 crosses New Hampshire Route 104 at Exit 23 on the eastern edge of the CDP. I-93 leads north 11 miles (18 km) to Plymouth and south 31 miles (50 km) to Concord, the state capital. NH 104 leads east 9 miles (14 km) to Meredith and west 5 miles (8 km) to Bristol. New Hampshire Route 132 turns south from NH 104 on the western side of the CDP and proceeds east through the village center, then continues south through Sanbornton, 12 miles (19 km) to U.S. Route 3 in Tilton.

According to the United States Census Bureau, the New Hampton CDP has a total area of 1.37 square miles (3.54 km^{2}), of which 1.27 square miles (3.29 km^{2}) are land and 0.10 square miles (0.25 km^{2}), or 7.10%, are water.

== Demographics ==
Historical population
Census	Pop.	Note	%±
2010	351		—
2020	373		6.3%
U.S. Decennial Census

As of the census of 2010, there were 351 people, 119 households, and 85 families residing in the CDP. There were 128 housing units, of which 9, or 7.0%, were vacant. The racial makeup of the CDP was 98.3% white, 0.3% Native American, 1.1% Asian, and 0.3% from two or more races. 2.0% of the population were Hispanic or Latino of any race.

Of the 119 households in the CDP, 39.5% had children under the age of 18 living with them, 54.6% were headed by married couples living together, 12.6% had a female householder with no husband present, and 28.6% were non-families. 24.4% of all households were made up of individuals, and 11.8% were someone living alone who was 65 years of age or older. The average household size was 2.48, and the average family size was 2.94.

29.3% of residents in the CDP were under the age of 18, 4.2% were from age 18 to 24, 31.4% were from 25 to 44, 24.5% were from 45 to 64, and 10.5% were 65 years of age or older. The median age was 35.6 years. For every 100 females, there were 99.4 males. For every 100 females age 18 and over, there were 92.2 males.

For the period 2011–15, the estimated median annual income for a household was $89,632, and the median income for a family was $88,971. The per capita income for the CDP was $33,602.
