= Lowell Connector =

Highway in Massachusetts

- American Legion Connector Highway
- Lowell Connector highlighted in red

Route information
- Length: 2.88 mi (4.63 km)
- Existed: 1962–present

Major junctions
- South end: US 3 in Chelmsford
- I-495 / US 3 in Lowell
- North end: Route 3A / Gorham Street in Lowell

Location
- Country: United States
- State: Massachusetts

Highway system
- Massachusetts State Highway System; Interstate; US; State

The Lowell Connector, officially the American Legion Connector Highway, is a 2.88-mile-long (4.63 km) freeway serving as a connector in the Massachusetts State Highway System that links nearby U.S. Route 3 (US 3) and Interstate 495 (I-495) to downtown Lowell, Massachusetts. The freeway has its southern terminus at US 3 and its northern terminus in downtown Lowell, where it feeds into city streets just north of an interchange with Route 3A. This alignment, nearly parallel to Route 110, provides much of Lowell with a direct freeway route to the Boston area to the south, and convenient (but slightly roundabout) freeway access to Lowell's eastern and western suburbs by way of Route 3 and I-495.

== History ==
Built in the early 1960s and opened on October 24, 1962, the Lowell Connector is located along the re-channelled River Meadow (or Hales) Brook. This alignment minimally affected existing neighborhoods, unlike many urban freeways in the region. Plans to extend the Connector through the city's Back Central neighborhood, up to and along the Concord River, then onward to Lowell's main street, Merrimack Street, were drawn out, but abandoned after they were decided to be too disruptive to one of the oldest parts of the city. This left the highway terminating abruptly at a residential section of Gorham Street.

Another plan circa 1968 had the connector connecting to the planned route of Massachusetts Route 213 in Dracut.

The Connector was officially named for the American Legion on May 20, 1963, a few months after opening; however, signs reflecting this were not posted until November 16, 2010.

Since 1976, the highway has shared its name with the student newspaper at UMass Lowell.

=== Interstate 495 Business ===
Interstate 495 Business
- Location: Lowell
- Existed: 1960s–2008

In the mid-1960s, the Connector was designated as Interstate 495 Business. However, there are no records indicating that this designation was ever approved by either the Bureau of Public Roads (now FHWA) or the American Association of State Highway Officials (now AASHTO). Further, the Business I-495 designation was never posted on any signs for the Lowell Connector exit on I-495, US 3, or on any signs on the Connector mainline itself (verified by a comprehensive review of MassDPW signing plans for I-495, US 3, and the Lowell Connector from the late 1950s to the present). However, such signs were included on official maps and were physically posted on local streets intersecting the Connector. A lone shield remained for Business Spur I-495 along Plain Street (exit 4) for the Lowell Connector, but was taken down by 2008.

=== Crashes ===
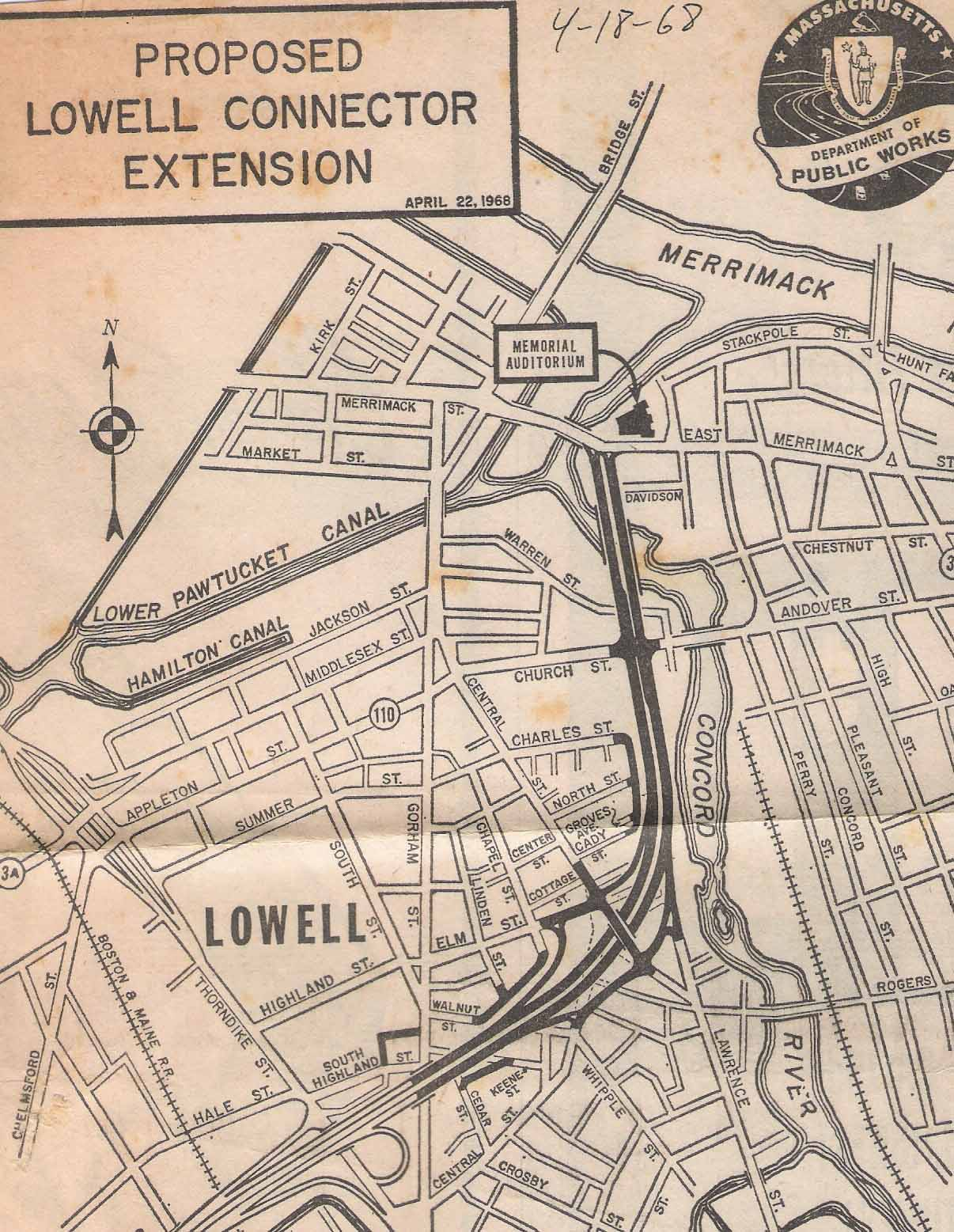
Proposed Lowell Connector Extension - Massachusetts Department of Public Works, 1968

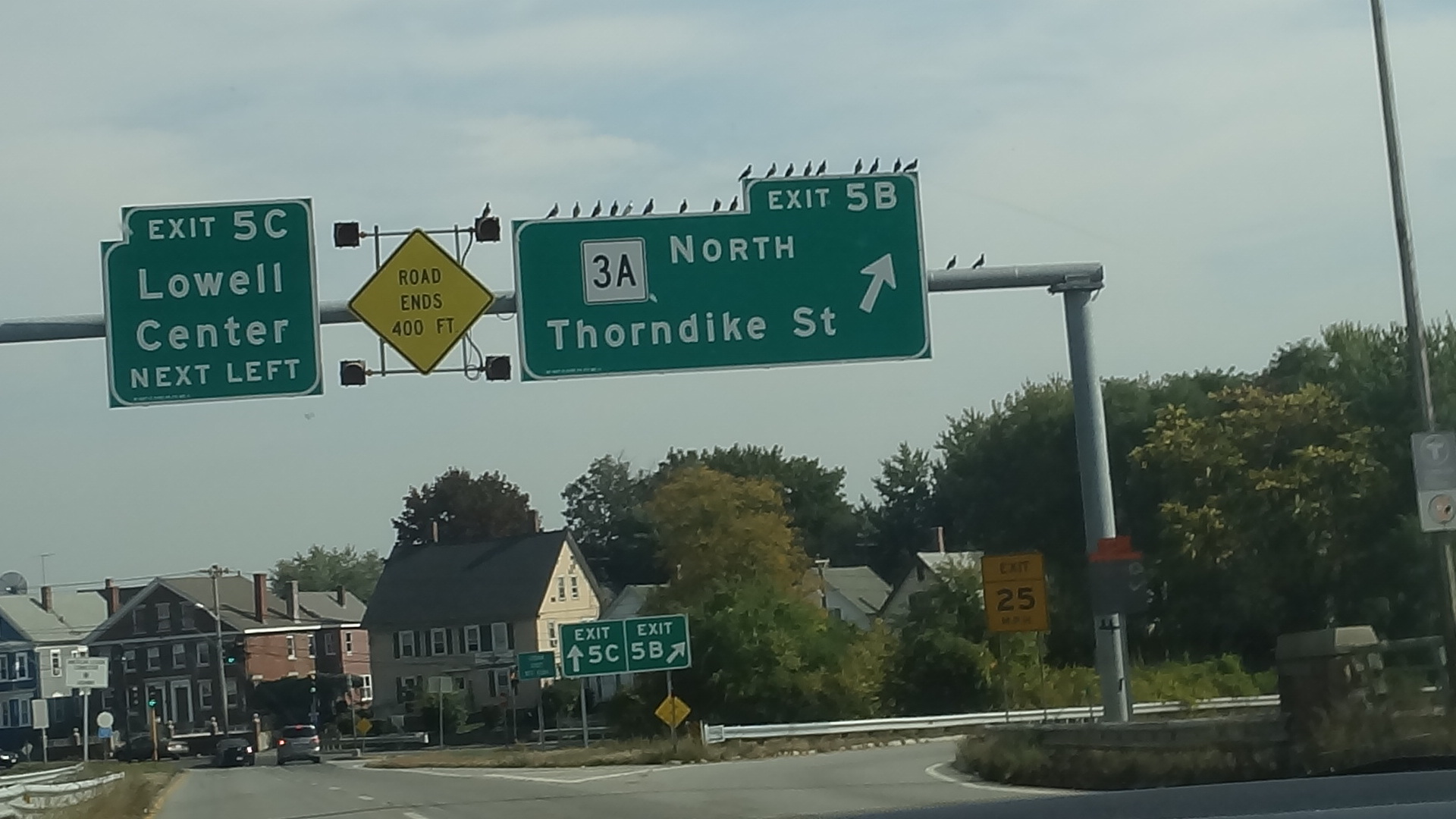
The infamous abrupt ending of the Lowell Connector at Gorham Street (exit 5C) with warning signs

In the 2000s, the Lowell Connector was ranked the most dangerous highway in Massachusetts, in terms of crashes per mile. The Connector has many serious design flaws, such as a lack of median guard rails, short and steep entrance and exit ramps, and inadequate spacing between exits which leads to weaving. An analysis by the Lowell Sun found that, on average between 2000 and 2005, there were 25 crashes per year, including nine that caused non-fatal injuries and one fatal crash on average. At the time, Lowell had one of the lowest incidences of seatbelt use in Massachusetts, which contributed to the high injury and death rates.

At its northern terminus, the Lowell Connector slopes downhill before abruptly terminating at Gorham Street (exit 5C). As a result, cars have overshot the end of the freeway and crashed into the brick wall of a residential property across the street; in 2005, the Lowell Sun reported that cars crashed into that house twice a year. After three people died on the highway in 2005, Massachusetts Department of Transportation (MassDOT) added median guardrails and multiple flashing warning signs giving the exact distance to the end of the road. In addition, the terminus features two flashing (strobe) stoplights and a metal railing, protecting the property at the opposite end of the intersection.

== Exit list ==
All interchanges were to be renumbered to milepost-based numbers under a project scheduled to start in 2016. However, this project was indefinitely postponed by MassDOT. On November 18, 2019, MassDOT announced that the Lowell Connector's exit numbers would not be changed because its exits were so tightly spaced. The entire route is in Middlesex County.

Location	mi	km	Exit	Destinations	Notes
Chelmsford	0.0	0.0	1A	US 3 south – Boston	Southern terminus; exit 80 on US 3
Lowell	0.8	1.3	81A (NB); 1B-2 (SB)	I-495 / US 3 north – Lawrence, Worcester, Nashua, NH	No northbound access to I-495 south/US 3; signed as exits 1B (I-495 north), 2A (I-495 south) and 2B (US 3) southbound; Northbound exit number is based on US-3's mileage
Lowell	1.2	1.9	3	Industrial Avenue	
Lowell	2.0	3.2	4	Plain Street – Lowell Highlands	
Lowell	2.8	4.5	5	Route 3A (Thorndike Street) – Lowell, Chelmsford, Billerica	Northbound exit and southbound entrance; signed as exits 5A (south) and 5B (north)
Lowell	2.9	4.7	5C	Gorham Street – Lowell Center	Northern terminus; at-grade intersection
1.000 mi = 1.609 km; 1.000 km = 0.621 mi: Incomplete access
