= North Chelmsford, Massachusetts =

Village in Chelmsford, Massachusetts, United States

Coordinates: 42°38′20″N 71°22′58″W

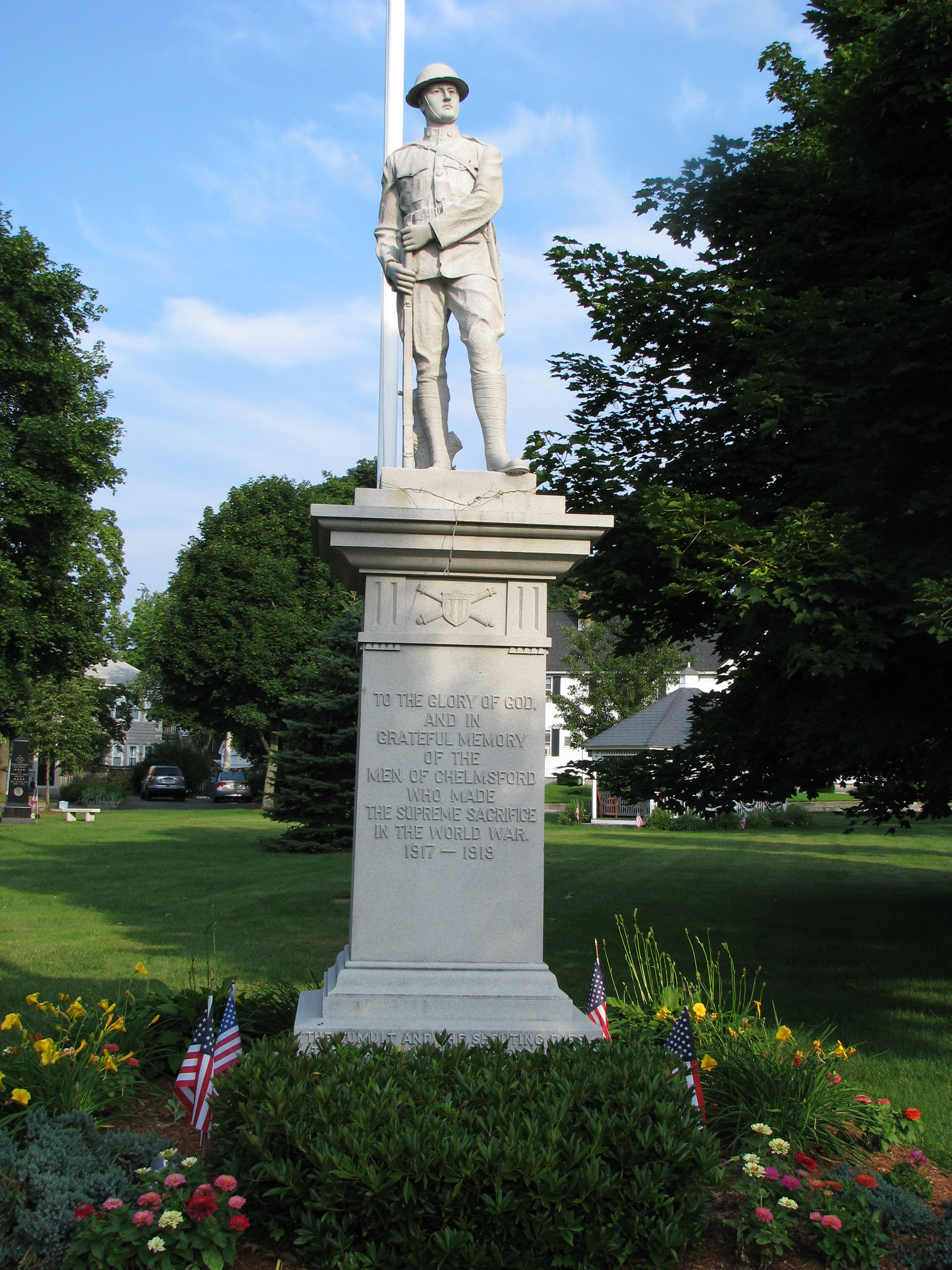
A.W. Vinal statue in Vinal Square, or North Chelmsford Center

North Chelmsford is an unincorporated village in the town of Chelmsford, Massachusetts, United States. Although North Chelmsford has its own zip code (01863), library, post office, fire station, water district, and local calling area, it is otherwise run by the same local town government and shares a school district with Chelmsford.

North Chelmsford is smaller and more densely populated than neighboring Chelmsford. North Chelmsford's separate identity, though not a seriously debated issue, is still a topic of discussion—the Lowell Sun ran an article on August 7, 2005, titled "Chelmsford's civil war still raging on."

== Education ==
Chelmsford High School is located in North Chelmsford. Most students who live in North Chelmsford go to Harrington Elementary School and later, Parker Middle School.

== Government and infrastructure ==
The Fay A. Rotenberg School, a juvenile correctional facility for girls operated by the Robert F. Kennedy Children's Action Corps, Inc. on behalf of the Massachusetts Department of Youth Services, first opened in North Chelmsford in 1982; this facility, which had 16 beds, was on Princeton Street, near the border with Lowell. In 2006 the school moved to its current location in Westborough.

== Geography ==
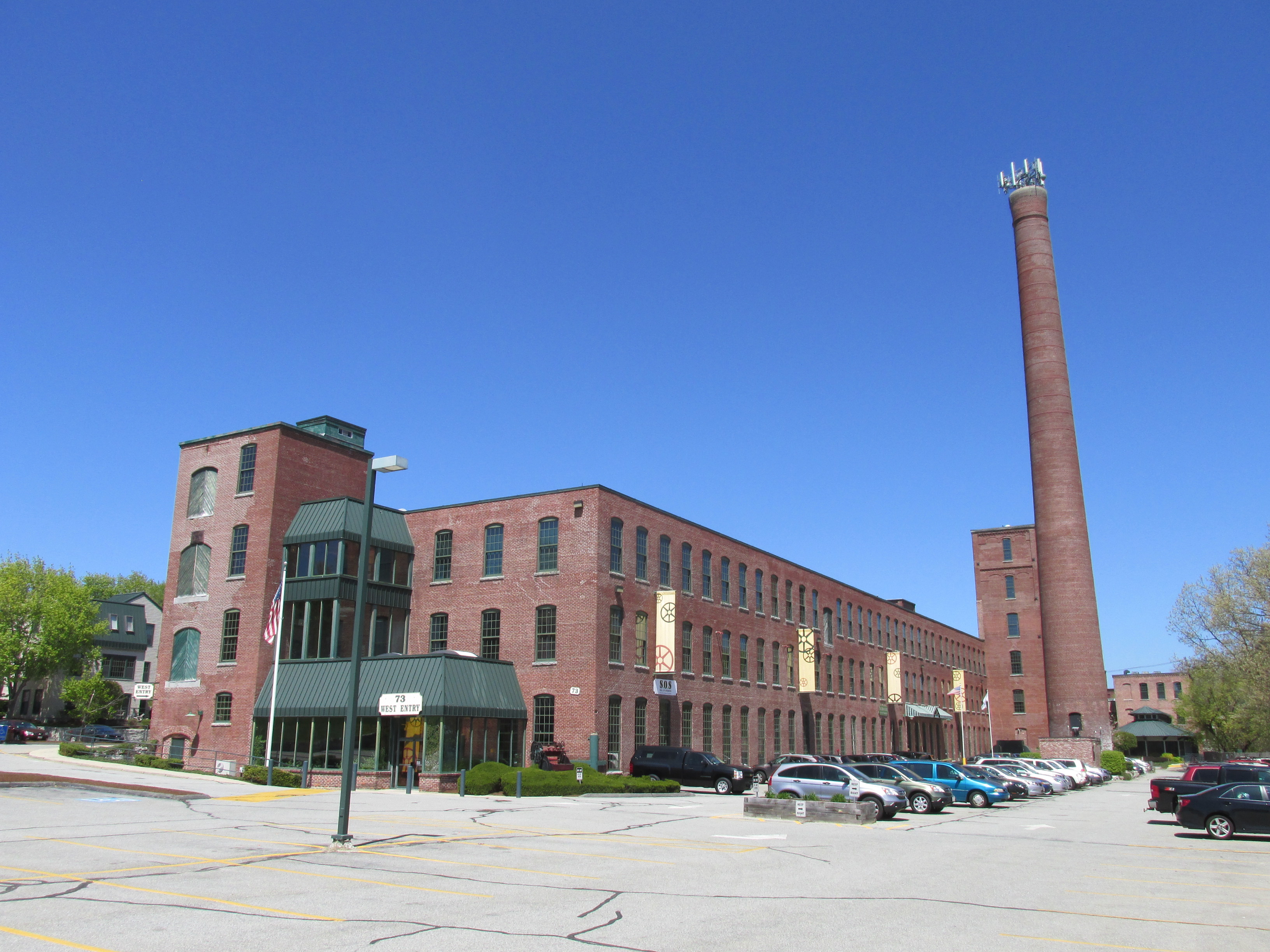
With its proximity to Lowell, numerous mills still stand in North Chelmsford.

North Chelmsford is along the Merrimack River and Stony Brook. Freeman Lake, originally on maps as Newfield Pond (or as it used to be known, Crystal Lake, due to an ice company with the same name once located where the dam is today) sits alongside Route 40 a short distance from Vinal Square. It is also the site of Varney Park, the Chelmsford Senior Center, and the North Chelmsford Water District. In 1986 the lake was given its new name in honor of Bruce Freeman, who paid to have the dam reconstructed following its collapse in 1970 (which drained the lake).

North Chelmsford is centered on the intersection of 3A, 40, and a few local roads. This intersection is known as Vinal Square, after local World War I Private Alberton W. Vinal, who was killed in France. A stone monument is dedicated to him and Chelmsford's other World War I fatalities on the Square's common.

== Transportation ==
U.S. Route 3 has two signed North Chelmsford exits—one for Route 40 (Exit 86), the other for Drum Hill (Exit 84).

A Massachusetts Bay Transportation Authority commuter rail station is proposed to be located in North Chelmsford should a proposed extension of the Lowell Line to Nashua, New Hampshire, be completed.

== Notable person ==
- Jack Eichel (born 1996), NHL player
