= Bellamy Reservoir =

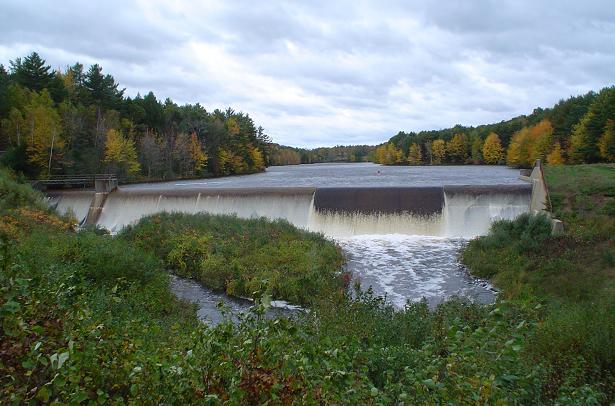
- Bellamy Reservoir dam in Madbury

- Location within New Hampshire Location within the United States
- Location: Strafford County, New Hampshire
- Coordinates: 43°11′17″N 70°57′13″W
- Type: Reservoir
- Primary inflows: Bellamy River; Mallego Brook
- Primary outflows: Bellamy River
- Basin countries: United States
- Max. length: 3.2 mi (5.1 km)
- Max. width: 0.5 mi (0.8 km)
- Surface area: 333 acres (135 ha)
- Average depth: 10 ft (3.0 m)
- Max. depth: 30 ft (9.1 m)
- Surface elevation: 125 ft (38 m)
- Settlements: Madbury

Bellamy Reservoir is a 333-acre (135 ha) impoundment located in Strafford County in eastern New Hampshire, United States, in the town of Madbury. An eastern arm of the lake extends a short distance into Dover. The reservoir serves as the primary water supply for the city of Portsmouth, New Hampshire. Its outlet is the Bellamy River, a tributary of Great Bay, a tidal estuary connected to the Atlantic Ocean by the Piscataqua River. The dam was built in 1960 to supply water to Portsmouth and the Pease Air Force base.

The reservoir is classified as a warmwater fishery, with observed species including largemouth bass, chain pickerel, horned pout, and black crappie.

== See also ==
- List of lakes in New Hampshire
