= New Hampshire Route 132 =

State highway in central New Hampshire, US

New Hampshire Route 132
- Map of central New Hampshire with NH 132 highlighted in red

Route information
- Maintained by NHDOT
- Length: 40.012 mi (64.393 km)

Major junctions
- South end: NH 9 in Concord
- I-393 / US 4 / US 202 in Concord; I-93 / US 4 in Concord; I-93 / US 3 / NH 11 in Tilton; I-93 in Tilton; I-93 in New Hampton
- North end: US 3 / NH 25 in Ashland

Location
- Country: United States
- State: New Hampshire
- Counties: Merrimack, Belknap, Grafton

Highway system
- New Hampshire Highway System; Interstate; US; State; Turnpikes
← NH 130	→ NH 135
← NH 3A	→ US 4

New Hampshire Route 132 (abbreviated NH 132) is a 40.012-mile-long (64.393 km) north–south highway in Belknap and Merrimack counties in central New Hampshire. NH 132 runs from Concord north to Ashland in the Lakes Region, parallel to Interstate 93.

The southern terminus of NH 132 is at New Hampshire Route 9 near Concord Municipal Airport. The northern terminus of NH 132 is at U.S. Route 3 and New Hampshire Route 25 in Ashland.

== Route description ==
NH 132 serves as a local route closely paralleling I-93 for its entire length. This is a role usually held by US 3, however in the Lakes Region, US 3 takes a more easterly route and deviates some distance from I-93.

The route's southern terminus is at NH 9 in Concord and is known locally as East Side Drive. In East Concord village, a traffic circle provides access to Shawmut Street, West Portsmouth Street, and I-93, while NH 132 exits the traffic circle on Mountain Road. Near the northern boundary of Concord, Hoit Road provides access to I-93 and US 4. Entering Canterbury the local name changes to Southwest Road, and then at Center Road (which provides access to the Canterbury town center) changes again to Northwest Road. Entering Northfield the local name becomes Concord Road, and NH 132 crosses under I-93 without interchanging. Closely paralleling the southbound lanes of I-93, it crosses under it again without an interchange, doubles back over the freeway, and has a half interchange with it just south of the twin villages of Tilton Northfield. Here the local name changes to Park Street, and after crossing a bridge over the Winnipesaukee River and entering the town of Tilton, it immediately joins US 3 along Main Street. Another interchange with I-93 occurs in the main commercial district of Tilton, and immediately after the interchange, NH 132 leaves its concurrency with US 3 to turn northbound along Sanborn Road entering the town of Sanbornton.

After passing the main village of Sanbornton, NH 127 has its eastern terminus at NH 132 in the village of Gaza, at which point the name changes to Stage Road. Passing between I-93 and Hermit Lake, NH 132 crosses under the freeway again briefly entering the town of Meredith before entering New Hampton without intersecting any other roads. Intersecting with NH 104 near New Hampton School, NH 132 merges with NH 104 and goes east to have another interchange with I-93. Just east of the interchange, NH 132 leaves the concurrency and turns north on an unnamed road. NH 132 passes under I-93 twice more before leaving New Hampton and entering Ashland, just south of the main village of that town. In Ashland, the route follows Depot Street before reaching its northern terminus at US 3/NH 25 (Daniel Webster Highway) at the center of the village.

== History ==

NH 132 was once known as New Hampshire Route 3B, a designation derived from U.S. Route 3, as there is no state route numbered "3" in New Hampshire. The Route 3B designation was in use circa 1941 through 1971, per newspapers of the era.

== Major intersections ==
County	Location	mi	km	Destinations	Notes
Merrimack	Concord	0.000	0.000	NH 9 – Portsmouth, Concord	Southern terminus
Merrimack	Concord	0.435– 0.618	0.700– 0.995	I-393 / US 4 / US 202 to I-93 – Portsmouth, Plymouth, Manchester	Exit 2 on I-393 / US 4 / US 202
Merrimack	Concord	2.302– 2.343	3.705– 3.771	I-93 / US 4 – Plymouth, Manchester	Exit 16 on I-93 / US 4
Merrimack	Concord	6.351	10.221	Hoit Road to I-93 / US 4 – Penacook, Boscawen	Exit 17 on I-93
Merrimack	Canterbury	10.791	17.366	West Road to I-93	Exit 18 on I-93
Merrimack	Northfield	16.822– 17.031	27.072– 27.409	I-93 south – Concord, Manchester	Exit 19 on I-93 north
Belknap	Tilton	17.932	28.859	US 3 south / NH 11 west – Franklin	Southern end of concurrency with US 3 / NH 11
Belknap	Tilton	19.210– 19.593	30.915– 31.532	I-93 – Canterbury, Concord, Boston, New Hampton, Plymouth NH 140 east – Belmont, Gilmanton	Exit 20 on I-93; Western terminus of NH 140
Belknap	Tilton	19.685	31.680	US 3 north / NH 11 east – Laconia	Northern end of concurrency with US 3 / NH 11
Belknap	Sanbornton	24.890	40.057	NH 127 south – Franklin	Northern terminus of NH 127
Belknap	New Hampton	32.371	52.096	NH 104 west – Bristol	Southern end of concurrency with NH 104
Belknap	New Hampton	33.137– 33.360	53.329– 53.688	I-93 – Tilton, Concord, Ashland, Plymouth	Exit 23 on I-93
Belknap	New Hampton	33.749	54.314	NH 104 east – Meredith	Northern end of concurrency with NH 104
Grafton	Ashland	40.012	64.393	US 3 / NH 25 – Plymouth, Holderness, Meredith	Northern terminus
1.000 mi = 1.609 km; 1.000 km = 0.621 mi: Concurrency terminus; Incomplete access
