= Interstate 393 =

Highway in New Hampshire

Interstate 393
- I-393 highlighted in red

Route information
- Auxiliary route of I-93
- Maintained by NHDOT
- Length: 4.6 mi (7.4 km)
- Existed: 1979–present
- NHS: Entire route

Major junctions
- West end: I-93 / US 4 / US 202 in Concord
- East end: US 4 / US 202 / NH 9 in Pembroke

Location
- Country: United States
- State: New Hampshire
- Counties: Merrimack

Highway system
- Interstate Highway System; Main; Auxiliary; Suffixed; Business; Future; New Hampshire Highway System; Interstate; US; State; Turnpikes
← US 302	→ US 1

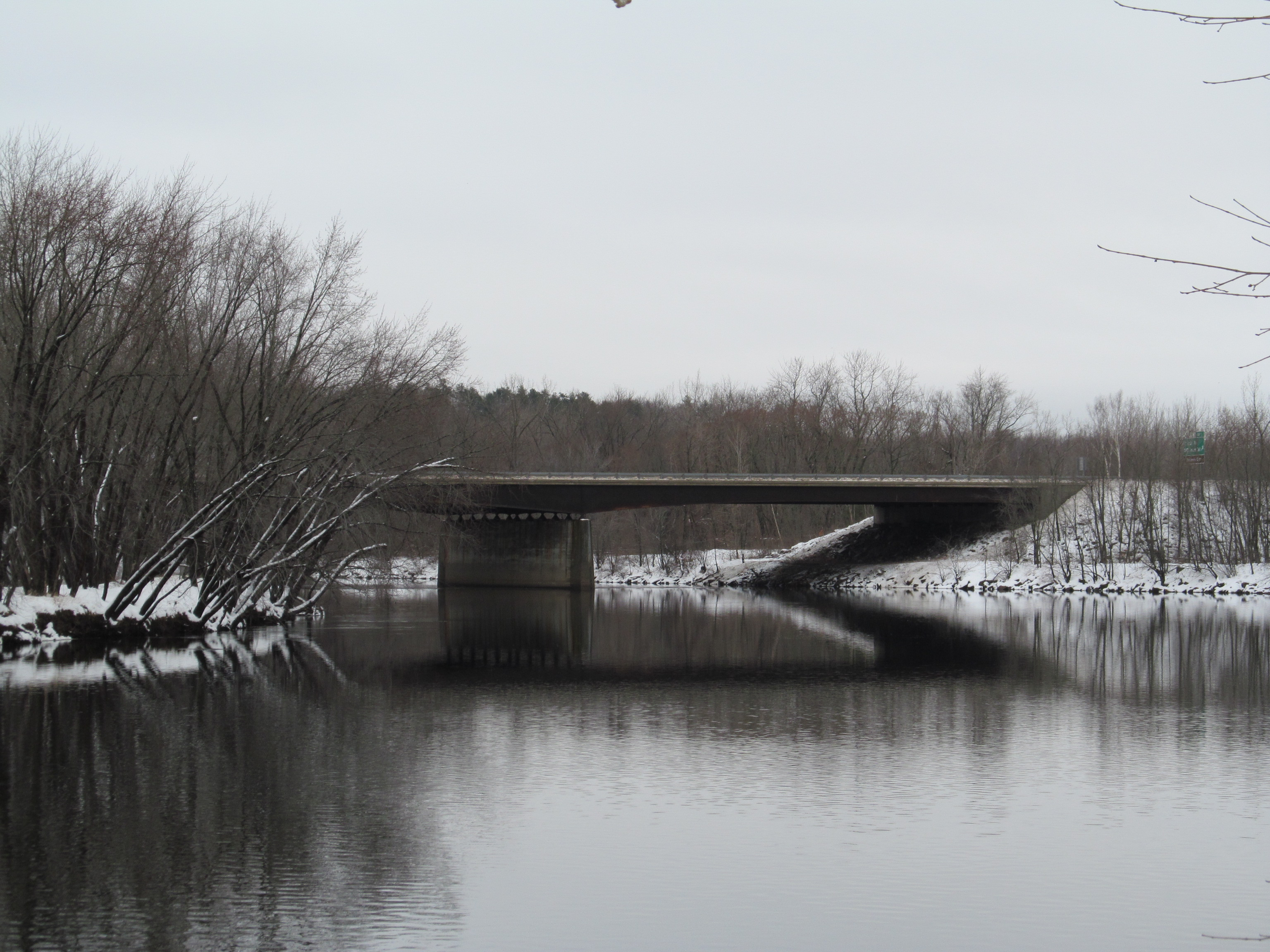
I-393 bridge over the Merrimack River

Interstate 393 (I-393) is a 4.6-mile (7.4 km) east–west auxiliary Interstate Highway extending from I-93 at Concord to Pembroke, New Hampshire. The primary purpose of the road is to bypass a densely built commercial strip on New Hampshire Route 9 (NH 9) in the eastern part of Concord. Several times a year, I-393 also serves traffic to events at New Hampshire Motor Speedway in Loudon. I-393 runs concurrently with US Route 4 (US 4) and US 202 for its entire length.

== Route description ==
I-393 begins at I-93's exit 15 interchange, where US 4 east leaves its concurrency with I-93 south and the I-393/US 4/US 202 concurrency begins. The four-lane freeway actually begins a short distance west of I-93 at the north end of Concord's Main Street where US 202 turns east from US 3. From there, the road then intersects Commercial Street just before the exit 15 interchange. Just east of the exit 15 cloverleaf is I-393's exit 1 to Fort Eddy Road. This exit provides access to NHTI – Concord's Community College, which is home to the McAuliffe-Shepard Discovery Center, an air and space science center. I-393 crosses the Merrimack River and continues east to exit 2, connecting to New Hampshire's State Office Park East and the area known locally as the Concord Heights via East Side Drive (NH 132). Further east is exit 3, I-393's last, to NH 106, which runs south past the commercial area around the Steeplegate Mall, and north to New Hampshire Motor Speedway and the Laconia region. After exit 3, the road turns northward, crossing the Soucook River into Pembroke. Beyond the bridge, I-393 ends and US 4 and US 202 merge down to a single lane before joining NH 9 and continuing eastward.

== History ==
When I-393 was first completed c. 1979, it ended at an at-grade intersection with NH 9 and NH 106 just west of where exit 3 now stands. Exit 3 and the extension beyond were completed in the late 1980s.

A feasibility study conducted in the 1980s proposed a number of alignments that would have extended I-393 beyond its eastern terminus to a new interchange (exit 10) on the Spaulding Turnpike between Dover and Rochester. This project studied the possibility of creating an east–west highway between Portsmouth and Concord. After much work, it was deemed impossible and an upgrade of US 4, a road which closely follows the route of the first New Hampshire turnpike from the early 1800s, was studied and completed.

The intersection of Commercial Street and US 202 used to be a four-way crossing, but, in recent years, Jersey barriers have been installed and a short bypass under US 202 has been constructed to prevent traffic from crossing the freeway, although the traffic lights remain. The lights on the westbound side have since been modified to become warning lights for the traffic signal at the intersection with US 3.

== Exit list ==
The entire route is in Merrimack County.

Location	mi	km	Exit	Destinations	Notes
Concord	0.000	0.000	–	US 202 west to US 3 (North Main Street) – Downtown	Continuation west; western end of US 202 concurrency
Concord	0.000	0.000	–	I-93 / US 4 west to I-89 north – Manchester, Lebanon, Plymouth	Western end of US 4 concurrency; exit 15E on I-93
Concord	0.257	0.414	1	Fort Eddy Road – NHTI Community College	
Concord	0.552	0.888	Veterans Memorial Bridge over the Merrimack River		
Concord	1.317	2.120	2	NH 132 (East Side Drive)	
Concord	3.144	5.060	3	NH 106 – Laconia, Pembroke	
Pembroke	4.594	7.393	–	US 4 east / US 202 east / NH 9 east	Continuation east; eastern end of US 4/US 202 concurrency
1.000 mi = 1.609 km; 1.000 km = 0.621 mi: Concurrency terminus

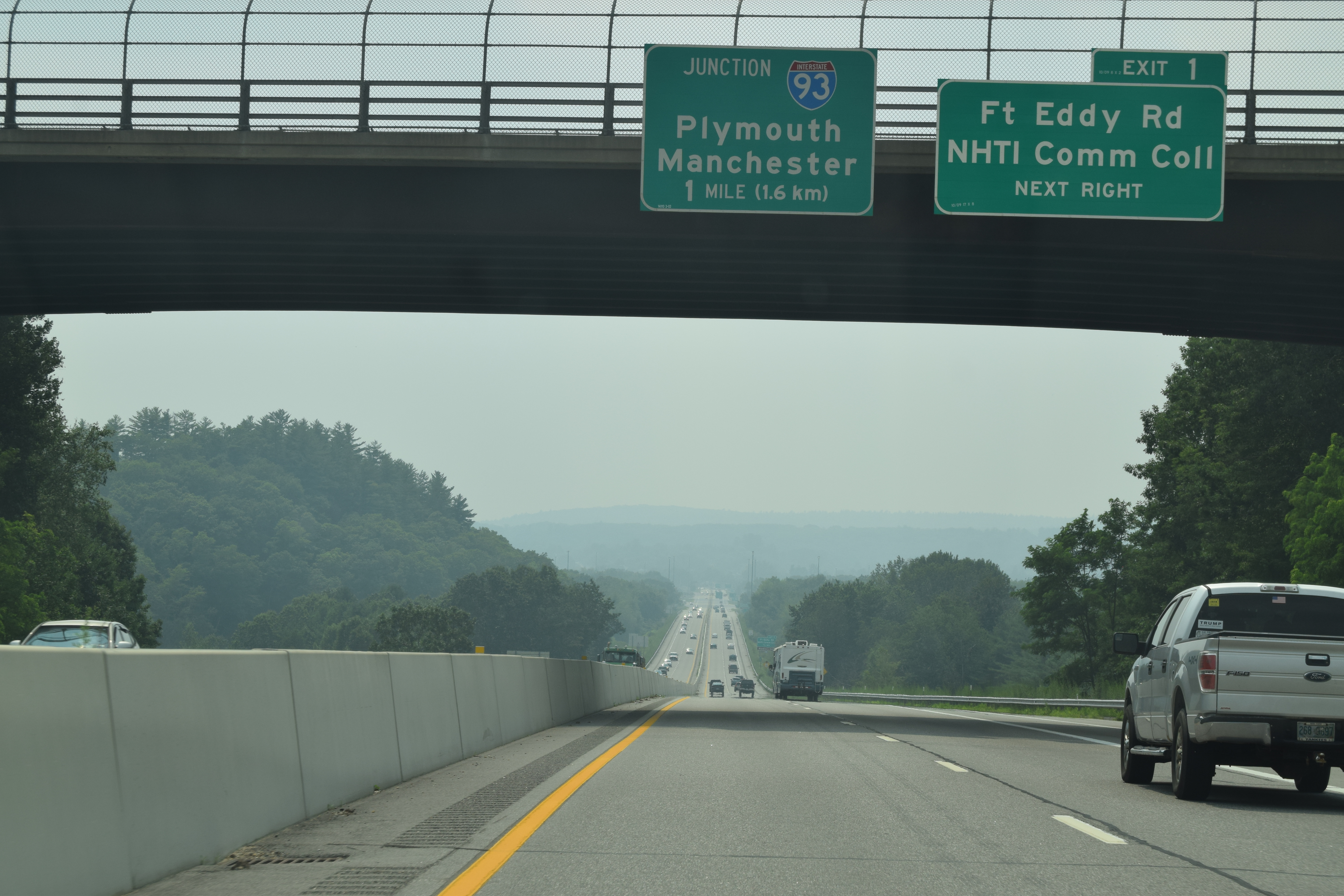
I-393 looking westbound, approaching exit 1 and I-93
