= Union Lake (Polk County, Minnesota) =

Lake in the state of Minnesota, United States

- Location within Minnesota
- Location: Polk County, Minnesota
- Coordinates: 47°36′13″N 96°4′54″W
- Type: lake

Union Lake is a lake in Polk County, in the U.S. state of Minnesota.

Union Lake was so named on account of its three sections being united by narrow channels.

== See also ==
- List of lakes in Minnesota
