= Swains Lake =

Lake in New Hampshire, United States

- Location within New Hampshire Location within the United States
- Location: Strafford County, New Hampshire
- Coordinates: 43°11′24″N 71°2′33″W
- Primary outflows: Bellamy River
- Basin countries: United States
- Max. length: 2.2 mi (3.5 km)
- Max. width: 0.7 mi (1.1 km)
- Surface area: 341 acres (1.38 km^{2})
- Average depth: 9 ft (2.7 m)
- Max. depth: 25 ft (7.6 m)
- Surface elevation: 279 ft (85 m)
- Islands: Calef Island; Lenzi Island
- Settlements: Barrington

Swains Lake (also known as Union Lake) is a 341-acre (1.38 km^{2}) water body located in Strafford County in eastern New Hampshire, United States, in the town of Barrington. Water from Swains Lake flows via the Bellamy River to the Piscataqua River estuary. A boat launch is available off Young Road. During the spring and summer it is a popular boating destination, while the ice of the colder months connects several snowmobile paths.

The lake is classified as a warmwater fishery, with observed species including largemouth bass, chain pickerel, horned pout, and bluegill.

== See also ==
- List of lakes in New Hampshire
