= Bellamy River =

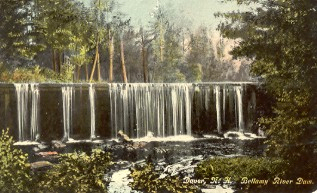
- Bellamy River Dam c. 1910

- Location within New Hampshire Location within the United States

Location
- Country: United States
- State: New Hampshire
- County: Strafford
- Municipalities: Barrington, Madbury, Dover

Physical characteristics
- Source: Swains Lake
  - location: Barrington
  - coordinates: 43°11′14″N 71°1′28″W
  - elevation: 279 ft (85 m)
- Mouth: Little Bay
  - location: Dover
  - coordinates: 43°7′36″N 70°50′51″W
  - elevation: 0 ft (0 m)
- Length: 15 mi (24 km)

Basin features
- Tributaries
  - left: Bumford Brook, Mallego Brook, Knox Marsh Brook, Varney Brook
  - right: Pierce Brook

The Bellamy River, in Strafford County, southeastern New Hampshire, is a tributary of the Piscataqua River about 15 miles (24 km) long. It rises in Swains Lake in Barrington, 9 miles (14 km) west of Dover. It flows east through the Bellamy Reservoir in Madbury and through Dover, then southeast as a tidal river to Little Bay, the channel connecting Great Bay with the Atlantic Ocean. The river at one time provided water for swimming behind a dam at Bellamy Park in Dover. This park was a favorite spot for local neighborhood children and young adults, but fell into disrepair in the late 1960s. The Dover High School class of 1976 held a school-approved burning of the remains of the dam as a class activity.

A short distance down the river from the park is the location of a former mill building, abandoned in the mid-20th century. The river helped power machinery in the mill.

Further along is the final dam, at the site of the former Sawyer Woolen Mills, a large manufacturer in Dover during the late 19th century and early 20th century. The river supplied the power to this large factory.

Beyond this dam the Bellamy River assumes its tidal nature, reverting to a small trickle at low tide.

== See also ==
- List of rivers of New Hampshire
- New Hampshire Historical Marker No. 165: The Alexander Scammell Bridge over the Bellamy River
