= Union Lake (Rice County, Minnesota) =

Lake in the state of Minnesota, United States

- Location within Minnesota
- Location: Rice County, Minnesota
- Coordinates: 44°27′31″N 93°18′33″W
- Type: lake

Union Lake is a lake in Rice County, in the U.S. state of Minnesota.

Union Lake was so named for the fact two streams flow into the lake where their waters are "united".

== See also ==
- List of lakes in Minnesota
