= Massachusetts Route 40 =

State highway in Middlesex County, MA, US

Route 40
- Route 40 highlighted in red

Route information
- Maintained by MassDOT
- Length: 10.46 mi (16.83 km)
- Existed: late 1940s–present

Major junctions
- West end: Route 119 / Route 225 in Groton
- US 3 in Chelmsford
- East end: Route 3A in Chelmsford

Location
- Country: United States
- State: Massachusetts
- Counties: Middlesex

Highway system
- Massachusetts State Highway System; Interstate; US; State
← Route 39	→ Route 41

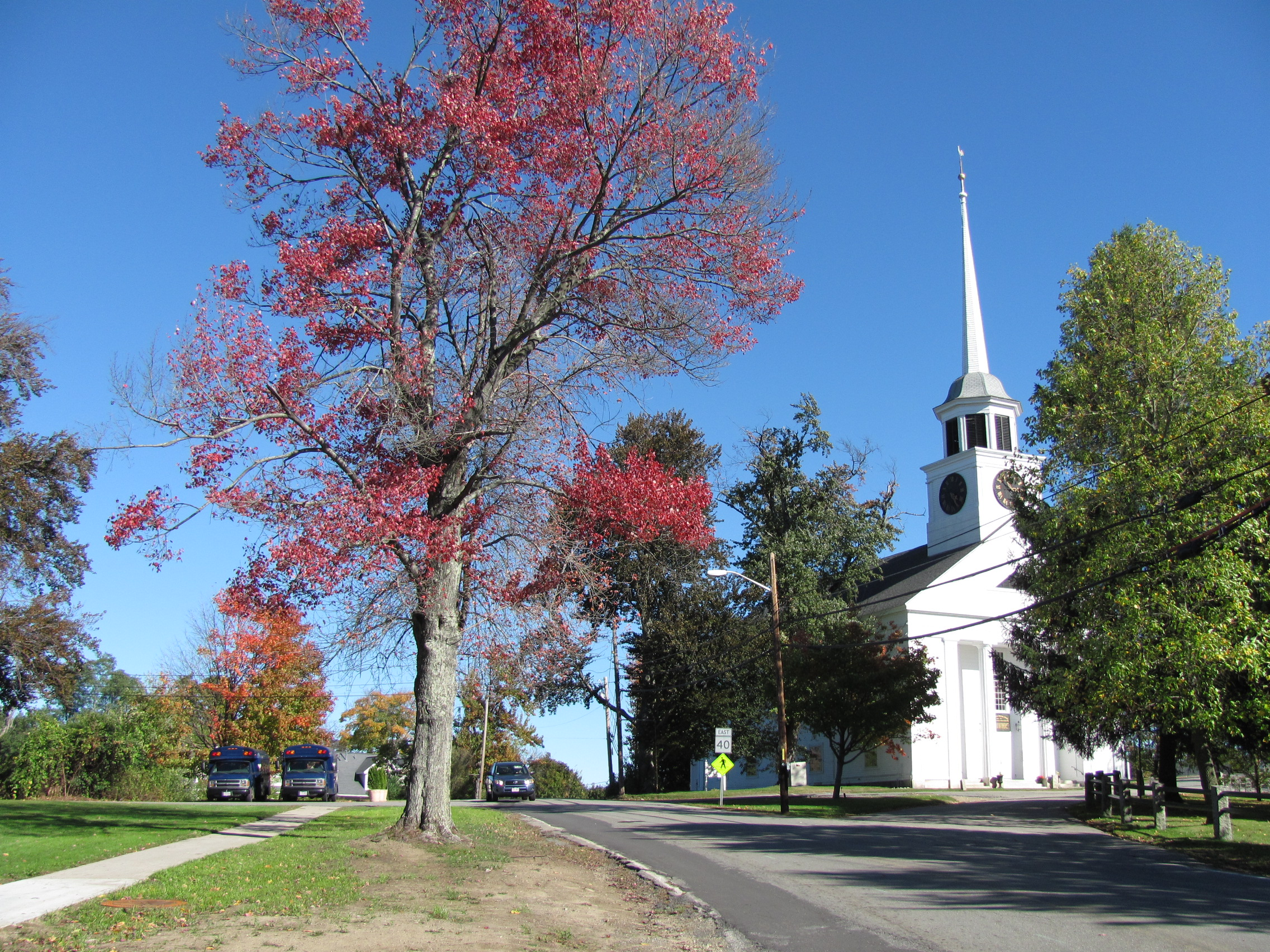
MA Route 40 eastbound in Groton

Route 40 is a 10.46-mile-long (16.83 km) east–west state route located in northeastern Massachusetts, entirely within Middlesex County. The short highway connects Groton and Chelmsford. Its western end is at an intersection with Massachusetts Route 119 and Massachusetts Route 225 in Groton, and its eastern end is at Route 3A in North Chelmsford. The route has existed since the late 1940s.

U.S. Route 3 has an interchange with Route 40, at exit 33.

== Route description ==
Route 40 begins in the west near the center of Groton at an intersection with Main Street (Routes 119 and 225). The highway proceeds eastward out of the downtown area, passing through the northern part of the town of Westford. Most of the route winds through rather densely wooded areas, with several ponds located alongside or near the highway. The road continues into the Chelmsford neighborhood of North Chelmsford, where it interchanges with U.S. Route 3 at Exit 33. Route 40 continues another mile eastward, emerging from the woods before ending at an intersection with Route 3A in the center of North Chelmsford at Vinal Square, located just west of the Merrimack River.

== Major intersections ==
The entire route is in Middlesex County.

Location	mi	km	Destinations	Notes
Groton	0.00	0.00	Route 119 / Route 225 (Main Street) – Littleton, Townsend	Western terminus
Chelmsford	9.10	14.65	US 3 – Burlington, Nashua, NH	Exit 86 on US 3; partial cloverleaf interchange
Chelmsford	10.46	16.83	Route 3A – Tyngsboro, Lowell	Eastern terminus
1.000 mi = 1.609 km; 1.000 km = 0.621 mi
