= New Hampshire Route 104 =

State highway in central New Hampshire, US

New Hampshire Route 104
- Map of central New Hampshire with NH 104 highlighted in red

Route information
- Maintained by NHDOT
- Length: 23.350 mi (37.578 km)

Major junctions
- West end: US 4 in Danbury
- I-93 in New Hampton
- East end: US 3 in Meredith

Location
- Country: United States
- State: New Hampshire
- Counties: Merrimack, Grafton, Belknap

Highway system
- New Hampshire Highway System; Interstate; US; State; Turnpikes
← NH 103	→ NH 106

New Hampshire Route 104 (abbreviated NH 104) is a 23.350-mile-long (37.578 km) secondary east–west highway in central New Hampshire, United States. The highway runs from Danbury to Meredith on Lake Winnipesaukee in the Lakes Region.

The western terminus of NH 104 is in Danbury at U.S. Route 4. The eastern terminus is at U.S. Route 3 south of the town of Meredith, between Lake Winnipesaukee and Lake Waukewan. NH 104 is locally named the Ragged Mountain Highway between Danbury and Bristol.

Until the 1970s, NH 104 used the Smith River Road between Danbury and Bristol. This scenic, winding road parallels the Smith River. However it was a frustratingly slow drive as a main highway, so the new overland Ragged Mountain Highway was a welcome replacement route for NH 104, leaving the old Smith River Road as a popular route for recreational access to the river.

== Major intersections ==
County	Location	mi	km	Destinations	Notes
Merrimack	Danbury	0.000	0.000	US 4 – Andover, Grafton, Canaan	Western terminus
Grafton	Bristol	9.176	14.767	NH 3A north (Lake Street) – Plymouth	Western end of concurrency with NH 3A
Grafton	Bristol	9.372	15.083	NH 3A south (North Main Street) – Franklin	Eastern end of concurrency with NH 3A
Belknap	New Hampton	14.097	22.687	NH 132 south (Main Street) – Sanbornton	Western end of concurrency with NH 132
Belknap	New Hampton	14.863– 15.086	23.920– 24.279	I-93 (Styles Bridges Highway) – Tilton, Concord, Ashland, Plymouth	Exit 23 on I-93
Belknap	New Hampton	15.475	24.905	NH 132 north – Ashland	Eastern end of concurrency with NH 132
Belknap	Meredith	23.350	37.578	US 3 (Daniel Webster Highway) – Weirs Beach, Laconia, Meredith, Ossipee	Eastern terminus
1.000 mi = 1.609 km; 1.000 km = 0.621 mi: Concurrency terminus
