= Salisbury, New Hampshire =

- Town
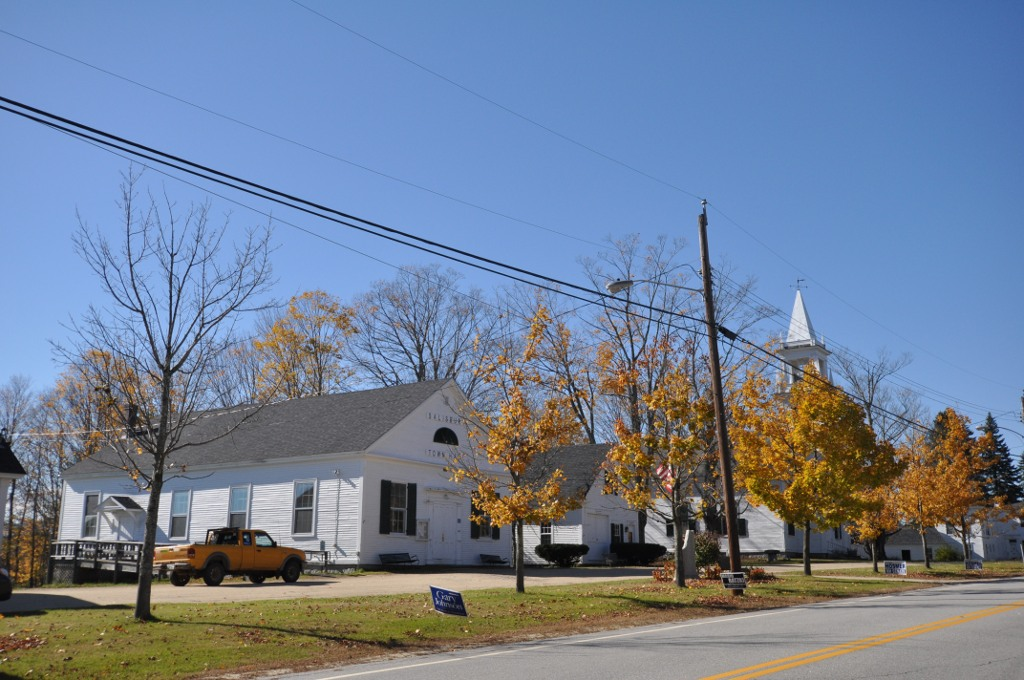
- Old town hall and church (now historic society)

- Seal

- Location in Merrimack County and the state of New Hampshire
- Coordinates: 43°22′53″N 71°45′48″W
- Country: United States
- State: New Hampshire
- County: Merrimack
- Incorporated: 1768
- Villages: Salisbury; Salisbury Heights; West Salisbury

Area
  - Total: 39.8 sq mi (103.1 km^{2})
  - Land: 39.6 sq mi (102.5 km^{2})
  - Water: 0.23 sq mi (0.6 km^{2}) 0.56%
- Elevation: 807 ft (246 m)

Population (2020)
  - Total: 1,422
  - Density: 36/sq mi (13.9/km^{2})
- Time zone: UTC−5 (Eastern)
  - Summer (DST): UTC−4 (Eastern)
- ZIP codes: 03268 (Salisbury); 03235 (Franklin); 03278 (Warner)
- Area code: 603
- FIPS code: 33-66980
- GNIS feature ID: 873714
- Website: www.salisburynh.org

Salisbury is a town in Merrimack County, New Hampshire, United States. The population was 1,422 at the 2020 census.

== History ==
While still part of Massachusetts, the town was granted as "Baker's Town" after Captain Thomas Baker in 1736. After the border between Massachusetts and New Hampshire was fixed, the town was on the New Hampshire side of the border. It was re-granted by the Masonian proprietors in 1749 with the name "Stevenstown", after Colonel Ebenezer Stevens of Kingston, New Hampshire, and settled as early as 1750. Additionally known as "Gerrishtown" and "New Salisbury", the name "Salisbury" was taken when the town was incorporated in 1768.

== Geography ==
According to the United States Census Bureau, the town has a total area of 39.8 square miles (103.1 km^{2}), of which 39.6 square miles (102.5 km^{2}) are land and 0.2 square miles (0.6 km^{2}) are water, comprising 0.56% of the town. The highest point in Salisbury is along its western boundary, where the eastern slopes of Mount Kearsarge climb to 1,910 feet (580 m) above sea level.

The Blackwater River, a southward-flowing tributary of the Contoocook River and part of the Merrimack River watershed, runs through the western side of the town. A popular fishing and recreation spot is The Bay, a natural lake-like section of the river. The east side of the town is drained by streams that run directly to the Merrimack River.

=== Adjacent municipalities ===
- Andover (north)
- Franklin (northeast)
- Boscawen (southeast)
- Webster (south)
- Warner (southwest)

== Demographics ==
Historical population
Census	Pop.	Note	%±
1790	1,372		—
1800	1,767		28.8%
1810	1,913		8.3%
1820	2,016		5.4%
1830	1,379		−31.6%
1840	1,332		−3.4%
1850	1,228		−7.8%
1860	1,191		−3.0%
1870	897		−24.7%
1880	795		−11.4%
1890	655		−17.6%
1900	604		−7.8%
1910	478		−20.9%
1920	390		−18.4%
1930	350		−10.3%
1940	368		5.1%
1950	423		14.9%
1960	415		−1.9%
1970	589		41.9%
1980	781		32.6%
1990	1,061		35.9%
2000	1,137		7.2%
2010	1,382		21.5%
2020	1,422		2.9%
U.S. Decennial Census

At the 2000 census there were 1,137 people, 435 households, and 324 families in the town. The population density was 28.5 inhabitants per square mile (11.0/km^{2}). There were 514 housing units at an average density of 12.9 per square mile (5.0/km^{2}). The racial makeup of the town was 97.80% White, 0.70% African American, 0.26% Asian, 0.09% Pacific Islander, 0.18% from other races, and 0.97% from two or more races. Hispanic or Latino of any race were 0.70%.

Of the 435 households 31.7% had children under the age of 18 living with them, 69.0% were married couples living together, 4.1% had a female householder with no husband present, and 25.3% were non-families. 17.0% of households were one person and 6.2% were one person aged 65 or older. The average household size was 2.61 and the average family size was 3.00.

The age distribution was 24.5% under the age of 18, 6.1% from 18 to 24, 28.2% from 25 to 44, 31.1% from 45 to 64, and 10.0% 65 or older. The median age was 40 years. For every 100 females, there were 103.4 males. For every 100 females age 18 and over, there were 96.3 males.

The median household income was $55,000 and the median family income was $62,321. Males had a median income of $36,991 versus $28,462 for females. The per capita income for the town was $23,112. About 0.6% of families and 1.9% of the population were below the poverty threshold, including 0.7% of those under age 18 and 4.6% of those age 65 or over.

== Notable people ==
- Ichabod Bartlett (1786–1853), US congressman
- Samuel E. Pingree (1832–1922), Union Army officer, 40th governor of Vermont
- Ezekiel A. Straw (1819–1882), engineer, 34th governor of New Hampshire
- Daniel Webster (1782–1852), US congressman, senator from Massachusetts;
