= Bristol (CDP), New Hampshire =

Census-designated place in New Hampshire, United States

Bristol, New Hampshire
- Census-designated place
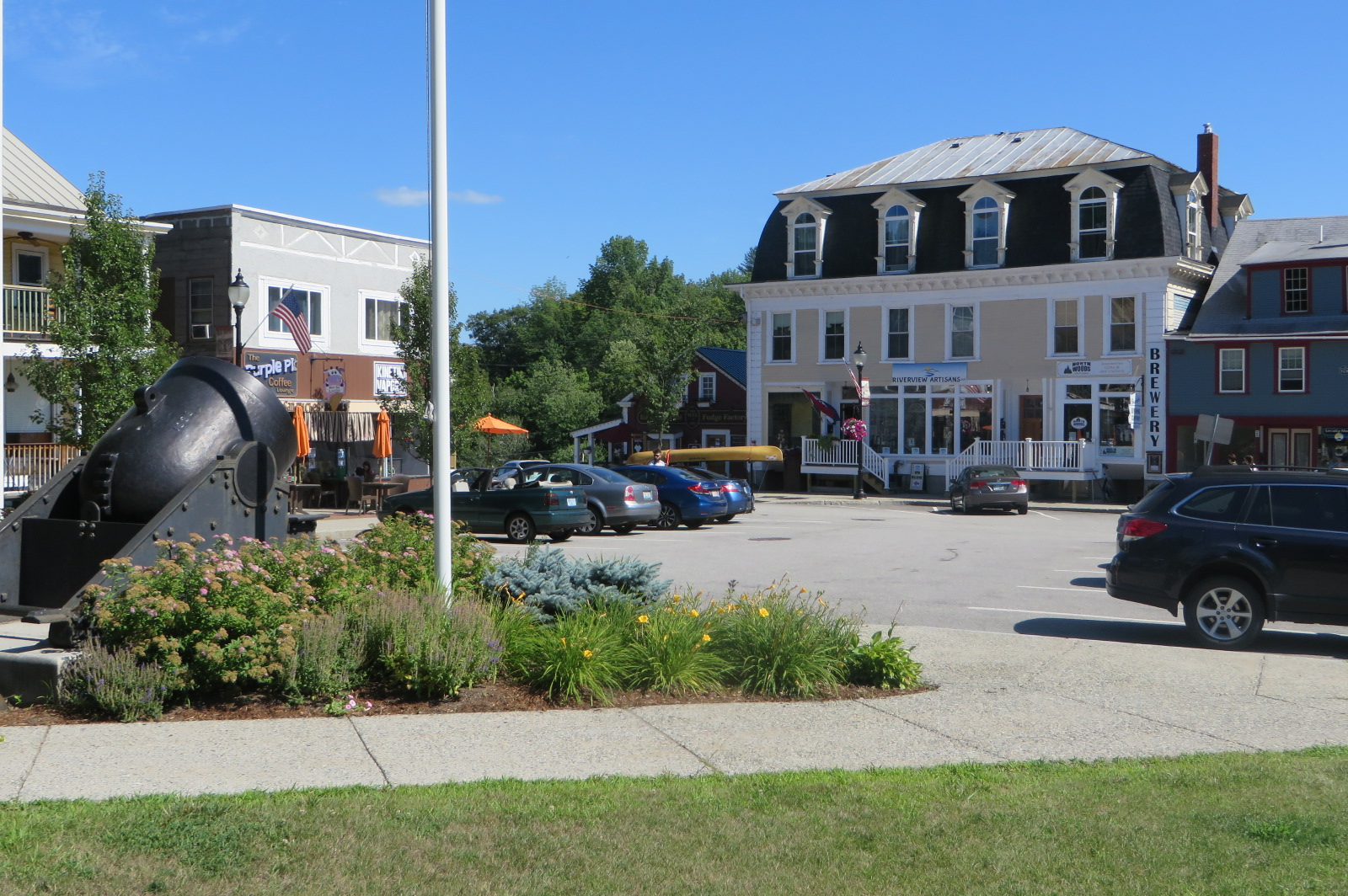
- Central Square in 2018

- Location within New Hampshire Location within the United States
- Coordinates: 43°35′28″N 71°44′12″W
- Country: United States
- State: New Hampshire
- County: Grafton
- Town: Bristol

Area
  - Total: 4.07 sq mi (10.55 km^{2})
  - Land: 4.01 sq mi (10.39 km^{2})
  - Water: 0.062 sq mi (0.16 km^{2})
- Elevation: 781 ft (238 m)

Population (2020)
  - Total: 1,911
  - Density: 476.5/sq mi (183.98/km^{2})
- Time zone: UTC-5 (Eastern (EST))
  - Summer (DST): UTC-4 (EDT)
- ZIP code: 03222
- Area code: 603
- FIPS code: 33-07620
- GNIS feature ID: 2378054

Bristol is a census-designated place (CDP) and the main village in the town of Bristol, New Hampshire, United States. The population of the CDP was 1,911 at the 2020 census, out of 3,244 in the entire town.

== Geography ==
The CDP is in the southern part of the town of Bristol, along the Newfound River where it descends to the Pemigewasset River. The CDP is bordered to the west by the town of Alexandria and to the southeast by the Pemigewasset, which is the Belknap County line. The CDP extends south to include all of Chestnut Street. To the east it extends out New Hampshire Route 104 beyond Hall Road, and to the north it includes all of Brookwood Park Road, Keezer Road, Wind Ridge Road, Redbone Drive, and Blue Tick Drive.

New Hampshire Route 3A passes through the center of town, leading north past Newfound Lake 14 miles (23 km) to New Hampshire Route 25 in West Plymouth, while to the south it leads 13 miles (21 km) to Franklin. New Hampshire Route 104 crosses NH 3A in the center of town, leading east 5.5 miles (8.9 km) to Interstate 93 in New Hampton and southwest 9 miles (14 km) to Danbury.

According to the U.S. Census Bureau, the Bristol CDP has a total area of 4.1 square miles (10.6 km^{2}), of which 4.0 square miles (10.4 km^{2}) are land and 0.1 square miles (0.2 km^{2}), or 1.54%, are water.

== Demographics ==
Historical population
Census	Pop.	Note	%±
1950	1,262		—
1960	1,054		−16.5%
1970	1,080		2.5%
1980	1,258		16.5%
1990	1,483		17.9%
2000	1,670		12.6%
2010	1,688		1.1%
2020	1,911		13.2%
U.S. Decennial Census

As of the census of 2010, there were 1,688 people, 721 households, and 440 families residing in the CDP. There were 1,027 housing units, of which 306, or 29.8%, were vacant. 236 of the vacant units were for seasonal use. The racial makeup of the town was 96.7% white, 0.4% African American, 0.1% Native American, 0.8% Asian, 0.0% Pacific Islander, 0.1% some other race, and 1.9% from two or more races. 1.2% of the population were Hispanic or Latino of any race.

Of the 721 households in the CDP, 31.2% had children under the age of 18 living with them, 42.6% were headed by married couples living together, 12.1% had a female householder with no husband present, and 39.0% were non-families. 31.9% of all households were made up of individuals, and 13.6% were someone living alone who was 65 years of age or older. The average household size was 2.33, and the average family size was 2.90.

23.7% of people in the CDP were under the age of 18, 7.4% were from age 18 to 24, 24.8% were from 25 to 44, 28.2% were from 45 to 64, and 15.8% were 65 years of age or older. The median age was 39.8 years. For every 100 females, there were 92.7 males. For every 100 females age 18 and over, there were 90.5 males.

For the period 2011–15, the estimated median annual income for a household was $41,210, and the median income for a family was $48,603. Male full-time workers had a median income of $40,954 versus $30,331 for females. The per capita income for the CDP was $22,504. 10.0% of the population and 6.7% of families were below the poverty line.
