= Londonderry (CDP), New Hampshire =

Census-designated place in New Hampshire, United States

Londonderry, New Hampshire
- Census-designated place
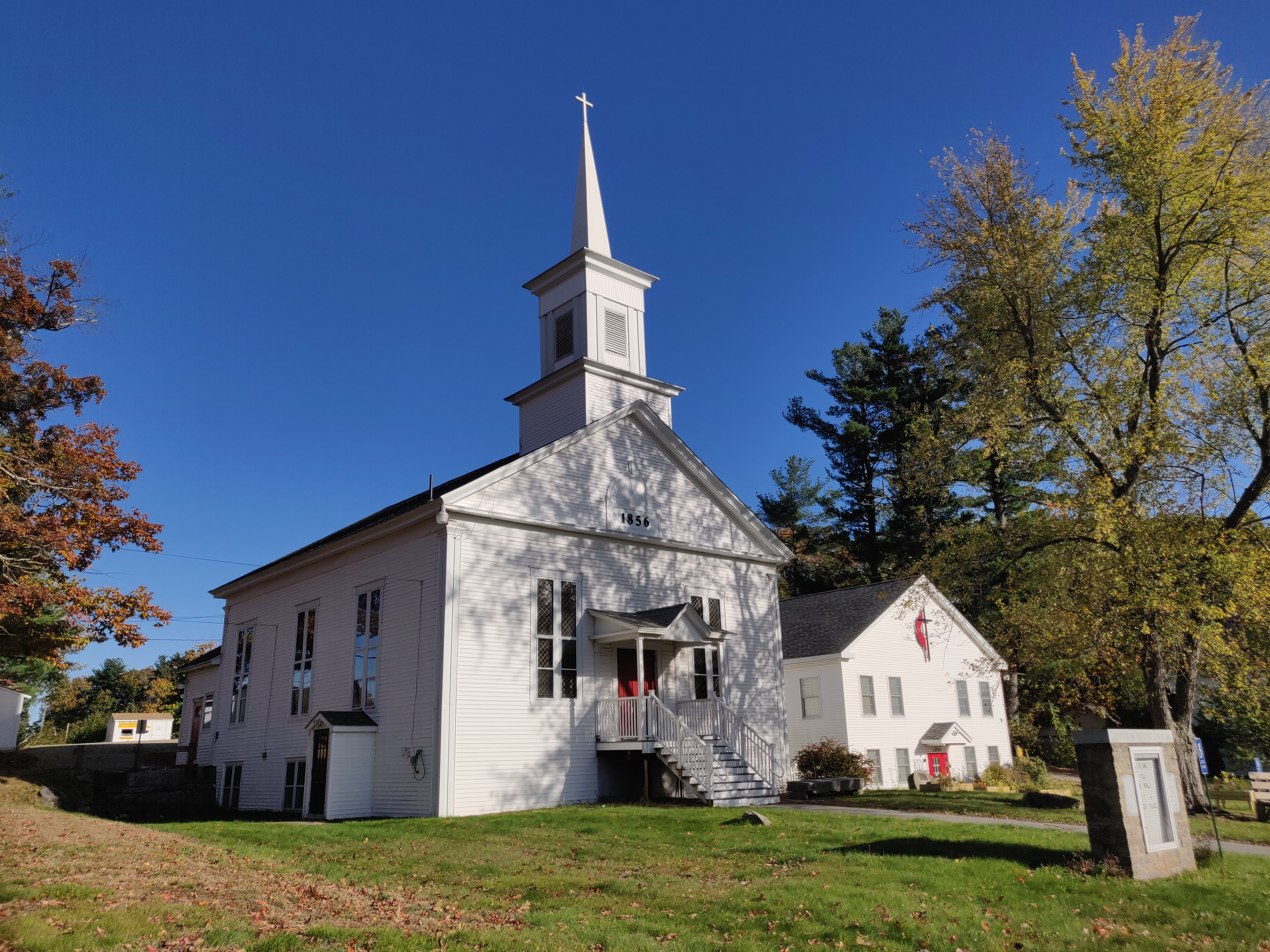
- Londonderry United Methodist Church

- Location within New Hampshire Location within the United States
- Coordinates: 42°51′03″N 71°21′43″W
- Country: United States
- State: New Hampshire
- County: Rockingham
- Town: Londonderry

Area
  - Total: 12.24 sq mi (31.71 km^{2})
  - Land: 12.22 sq mi (31.65 km^{2})
  - Water: 0.023 sq mi (0.06 km^{2})
- Elevation: 315 ft (96 m)

Population (2020)
  - Total: 11,645
  - Density: 953.0/sq mi (367.96/km^{2})
- Time zone: UTC-5 (Eastern (EST))
  - Summer (DST): UTC-4 (EDT)
- ZIP codes: 03038, 03053
- Area code: 603
- FIPS code: 33-43140
- GNIS feature ID: 2378079

Londonderry is a census-designated place (CDP) within the town of Londonderry, New Hampshire, United States. The population of the CDP was 11,645 at the 2020 census, out of 25,826 in the entire town.

== Geography ==
The CDP occupies the more intensively developed eastern and southern parts of the town of Londonderry, including the east half of the historic town center near the top of Moose Hill. The CDP includes the Londonderry town offices (east side of Mammoth Road) but not the Londonderry High School and Middle School complexes (west side of Mammoth Road). The CDP is bordered to the east by the town of Derry, to the southeast by the town of Windham, and to the southwest by the town of Hudson. From the Hudson town line, the CDP boundary follows New Hampshire Route 102 (Nashua Road), New Hampshire Route 128 (Mammoth Road), Stonehenge Road, Interstate 93, and Ash Street to the Derry town line.

New Hampshire Route 102 crosses the CDP, leading northeast 3 miles (5 km) to the center of Derry and southwest 7 miles (11 km) to Hudson. Route 128 leads north 5 miles (8 km) to New Hampshire Route 28 in North Londonderry and south 16 miles (26 km) to Lowell, Massachusetts. Manchester is 12 miles (19 km) to the north via Routes 128 and 28.

According to the U.S. Census Bureau, the Londonderry CDP has a total area of 12.2 square miles (31.7 km^{2}), of which 0.023 square miles (0.06 km^{2}), or 0.19%, are water. Most of the CDP drains southeast to Beaver Brook, which forms the border with the town of Windham and flows south to the Merrimack River in Lowell, Massachusetts. The southwestern corner of the CDP drains west via Chase Brook to the Merrimack in Litchfield.

== Demographics ==
Historical population
Census	Pop.	Note	%±
1990	10,114		—
2000	11,417		12.9%
2010	11,037		−3.3%
2020	11,645		5.5%
U.S. Decennial Census

As of the census of 2010, there were 11,037 people, 3,958 households, and 3,098 families residing in the CDP. There were 4,105 housing units, of which 147, or 3.6%, were vacant. The racial makeup of the CDP was 95.8% white, 0.8% African American, 0.1% Native American, 1.5% Asian, 0.03% Pacific Islander, 0.5% some other race, and 1.4% from two or more races. 2.5% of the population were Hispanic or Latino of any race.

Of the 3,958 households in the CDP, 39.9% had children under the age of 18 living with them, 62.8% were headed by married couples living together, 11.0% had a female householder with no husband present, and 21.7% were non-families. 16.4% of all households were made up of individuals, and 5.5% were someone living alone who was 65 years of age or older. The average household size was 2.79, and the average family size was 3.13.

25.6% of residents in the CDP were under the age of 18, 7.6% were from age 18 to 24, 22.9% were from 25 to 44, 33.6% were from 45 to 64, and 10.3% were 65 years of age or older. The median age was 41.3 years. For every 100 females, there were 96.2 males. For every 100 females age 18 and over, there were 93.0 males.

For the period 2011–15, the estimated median annual income for a household was $89,643, and the median income for a family was $97,386. Male full-time workers had a median income of $75,000 versus $43,291 for females. The per capita income for the CDP was $38,835. 3.6% of the population and 2.0% of families were below the poverty line, along with 5.4% of people under the age of 18 and 2.8% of people 65 or older.
