= New Hampshire Route 111 =

State highway in southeastern New Hampshire, US

New Hampshire Route 111
- Map of southern New Hampshire with NH 111 highlighted in red

Route information
- Maintained by NHDOT
- Length: 50.027 mi (80.511 km)

Major junctions
- West end: Route 111 at the Massachusetts state line near Hollis
- US 3 / Everett Turnpike in Nashua; I-93 in Windham; NH 107 / NH 125 in Kingston
- East end: NH 1A in North Hampton

Location
- Country: United States
- State: New Hampshire
- Counties: Hillsborough, Rockingham

Highway system
- New Hampshire Highway System; Interstate; US; State; Turnpikes
← NH 110B	→ NH 112
← NH 101C	→ NH 101E

New Hampshire Route 111 (abbreviated NH 111) is a 50.027-mile-long (80.511 km) east–west highway in Hillsborough and Rockingham counties in southeastern New Hampshire. The road runs from the Massachusetts border at Hollis to North Hampton on the Atlantic shore.

The western terminus of NH 111 is at the Massachusetts state line in Hollis, where, as Massachusetts Route 111 (Nashua Road), the road continues into the town of Pepperell, Massachusetts, ultimately terminating in Concord at Massachusetts Route 2. The eastern terminus of NH 111 is at the junction with Ocean Boulevard (New Hampshire Route 1A) in North Hampton. At its terminus, the road is known as Atlantic Avenue.

== Route description ==
New Hampshire Route 111's western terminus is at the Massachusetts state line at the southeastern corner of the town of Hollis, New Hampshire. The roadway continues to the south as Massachusetts Route 111. Eastbound NH 111 continues in a mostly northeasterly direction along Runnels Bridge Road, crossing the Nashua River about 1/2 mile (0.80 km) from the border, and passing the Overlook Country Club. Immediately after the Nashua River bridge, NH 111A leaves to the east along Groton Road. NH 111 crosses into the city of Nashua, and the name changes to West Hollis Street. In Nashua, the route parallels the Nashua River's south bank, moving through the suburban southwestern quadrant of the city. At U.S. Route 3, a complex interchange involves the U.S. Route 3 freeway, NH 111, the eastern terminus of NH 111A (now called Main Dunstable Road), and several local streets. Leaving the interchange, NH 111 splits into two one-way streets, with West Hollis Street carrying westbound 111, and Kinsley Street carrying eastbound 111. St. Joseph Hospital lies along this stretch. After crossing Main Street and passing Nashua City Hall and Southern New Hampshire Medical Center, the two one-way streets merge again onto East Hollis Street. Going through an industrial part of East Nashua, still following the south bank of the Nashua River, NH 111 crosses the twin-span Taylor Falls/Veterans Memorial bridges over the Merrimack River (known locally as the Hudson Bridge) into the town of Hudson.

Traversing Hudson Village along with NH 102 and intersecting NH 3A, the route goes east following Ferry Street and Burnham Road, before turning northeast along Central Street, one of the main commercial areas of the town of Hudson. In the village of Hudson Center, NH 111 passes the former site of Benson's Wild Animal Farm, now a town park known as Benson Park. Passing through an industrial area of eastern Hudson, NH 111 enters Windham shortly before crossing Mammoth Road/NH 128. NH 111 crosses through the middle of the town of Windham, known locally as Haverhill Road (west of the town center) and Indian Rock Road (east of the town center). An interchange with I-93 lies near Canobie Lake Park as well as the northern terminus of the central NH 111A. After intersecting with Rockingham Road/NH 28 the route turns to a more northerly direction, and crosses into the extreme northern part of Salem. Briefly entering the extreme southeastern corner of Derry near Island Pond, it passes through the northwest corner of the town of Atkinson, then enters the town of Hampstead.

Within Hampstead, NH 111 forms the main southwest-northeast road through town, crossing NH 121 in the southern part of town, and NH 121A in the northeastern, more commercial part of town, an area known as East Hampstead. At the Danville town line the route intersects the eastern NH 111A. NH 111 continues east to enter the town of Kingston, where the road ends at a T-intersection with NH 125. NH 111 joins NH 125 northbound, acting as a bypass of Main Street and the Kingston town center. NH 107 joins the bypass near the Kingston Fairways Golf Club, then NH 111 leaves the multiplex at the north end of Main Street, and follows Exeter Road northeast out of Kingston, into the town of Exeter.

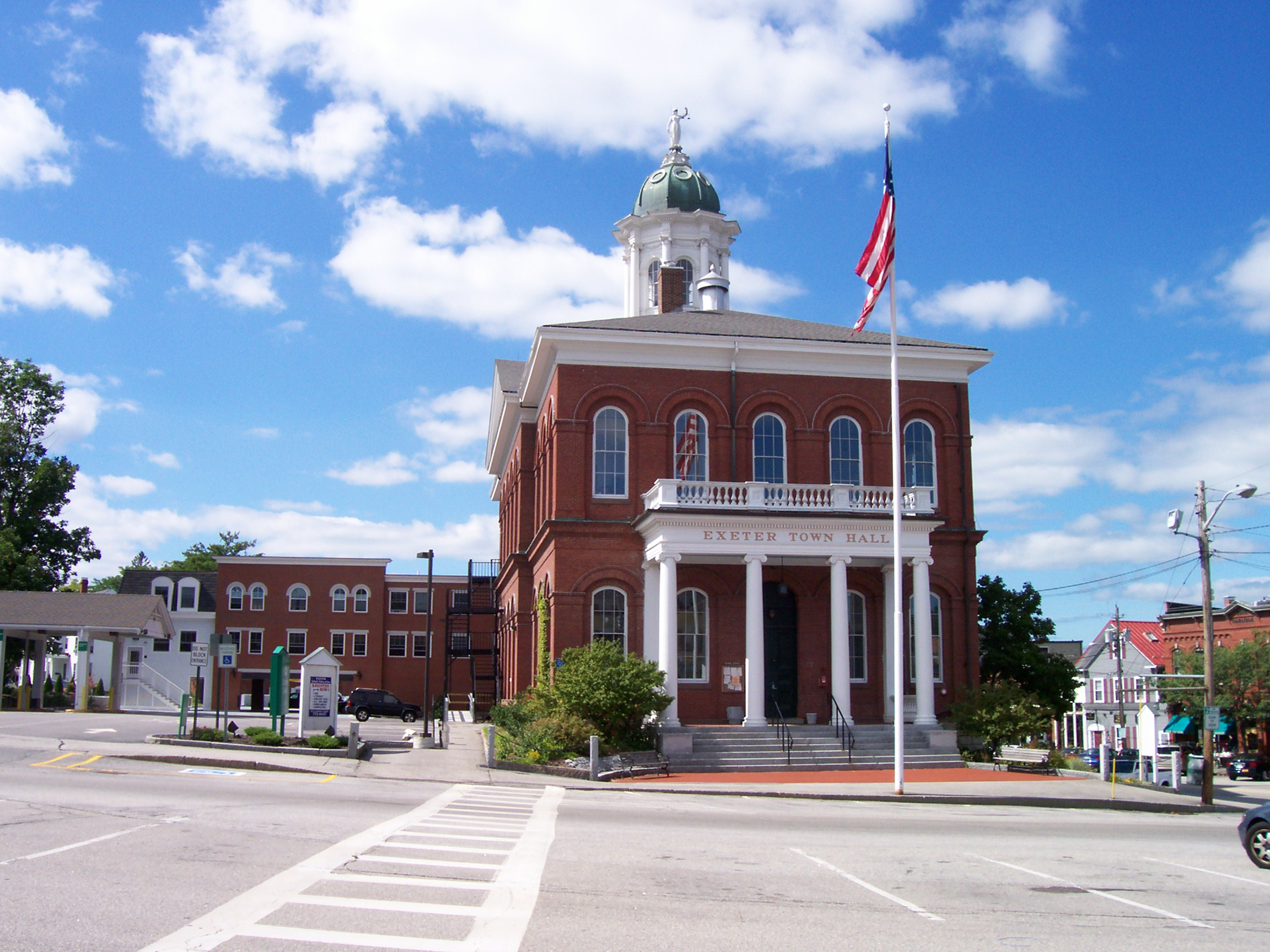
Route 111 passing in front of Exeter Town Hall

Upon entering Exeter, NH 111 becomes Kingston Road and approaches the downtown area from the southwest. Within downtown, it is known as Front Street. After crossing the campus of Phillips Exeter Academy, it joins NH 27 at Water Street (an intersection which serves as the terminus of the eastern NH 111A), and NH 108/Court Street and crosses a bridge over the Exeter River. Upon crossing the bridge, the three routes are now known as High Street, and continue towards the southeastern corner of town. Immediately after the bridge, NH 108 leaves to the north. Just before leaving town, there is a short concurrency with NH 88, then NH 111 leaves NH 27 along Exeter Road, and interchanges with NH 101. Leaving Exeter, NH 111 crosses a few dozen feet of the southern corner of Stratham, providing access to a small industrial park. Next entering the town of North Hampton, Exeter Road/NH 111 passes over, but does not interchange with, I-95. A complex five-way intersection lies near the center of North Hampton, with NH 111 crossing NH 151 and Hobbs Road. NH 111 turns southeast here along Atlantic Avenue, crossing US 1 and terminating at the Atlantic Ocean on Ocean Boulevard/NH 1A, in the area known as Little Boars Head.

== History ==

The portion of NH 111 between New Hampshire Route 27 in Hampton and NH 1A in Hampton Beach was once designated New Hampshire Route 101D.

== Major intersections ==
County	Location	mi	km	Destinations	Notes
Hillsborough	Hollis	0.000	0.000	Route 111 south (Nashua Road) – Pepperell	Continuation into Massachusetts
Hillsborough	Hollis	0.828	1.333	NH 111A east (South Depot Road) – Hollis Depot	Western terminus of NH 111A
Hillsborough	Nashua	4.554– 4.731	7.329– 7.614	US 3 / Everett Turnpike / NH 111A west (Main Dunstable Road) – Boston, Merrimack, Manchester	Eastern terminus of NH 111A; exits 5E-W on Everett Turnpike
Hillsborough	Hudson	7.734	12.447	NH 3A (Chase Street) / NH 102 north (Derry Road)	Southern terminus of NH 102
Rockingham	Windham	13.187	21.222	NH 128 (Mammoth Road) – Manchester, Pelham	
Rockingham	Windham	17.356– 17.940	27.932– 28.872	I-93 (Alan B. Shepard Highway) – Salem, Boston, Derry, Manchester	Exit 3 on I-93
Rockingham	Windham	18.018	28.997	NH 111A west (Range Road) – Pelham	Eastern terminus of NH 111A
Rockingham	Windham	18.804	30.262	NH 28 (Rockingham Road) – Derry, Salem	
Rockingham	Hampstead	24.374	39.226	NH 121 (Stage Road) – Hampstead, Atkinson	
Rockingham	Hampstead	27.070	43.565	NH 121A (Sandown Road / East Main Street) – Sandown, Plaistow	
Rockingham	Danville	27.970	45.013	NH 111A east (Main Street) – Danville	Western terminus of NH 111A
Rockingham	Kingston	31.448	50.611	NH 125 south – Plaistow	Western end of NH 125 concurrency
Rockingham	Kingston	33.169	53.380	NH 107 south (Depot Road) – East Kingston	Western end of NH 107 concurrency
Rockingham	Kingston	34.212	55.059	NH 107 north / NH 125 north	Eastern end of NH 107/NH 125 concurrency
Rockingham	Exeter	40.528	65.223	NH 108 south (Court Street)	Western end of NH 108 concurrency
Rockingham	Exeter	40.612	65.359	NH 27 west / NH 111A west (Water Street)	Western end of NH 27 concurrency; eastern terminus of NH 111A
Rockingham	Exeter	40.843	65.730	NH 108 north (Portsmouth Avenue)	Eastern end of NH 108 concurrency
Rockingham	Exeter	41.999	67.591	NH 88 east (Hampton Falls Road) – Hampton Falls	Western end of NH 88 concurrency
Rockingham	Exeter	42.089	67.736	NH 88 west (Holland Way) to NH 101 / NH 33 – Portsmouth, Manchester	Eastern end of NH 88 concurrency
Rockingham	Exeter	43.292	69.672	NH 27 east (Hampton Road) – Hampton	Eastern end of NH 27 concurrency
Rockingham	Exeter	43.457– 43.627	69.937– 70.211	NH 101 (Exeter–Hampton Expressway) to I-95 – Hampton, Exeter, Manchester	Exit 12 on NH 101
Rockingham	North Hampton	45.977	73.993	NH 151 (Post Road) – Greenland, Hampton	
Rockingham	North Hampton	46.721	75.190	US 1 (Lafayette Road) – Portsmouth, Hampton	
Rockingham	North Hampton	50.027	80.511	NH 1A (Ocean Boulevard) – Rye Beach, Hampton Beach	Eastern terminus
1.000 mi = 1.609 km; 1.000 km = 0.621 mi: Concurrency terminus

== Suffixed routes ==
=== New Hampshire Route 111A ===
New Hampshire Route 111A is a designation held by three separate state highways in New Hampshire. Although none of the segments directly connect, all three roadways are linked by their parent, New Hampshire Route 111.

==== Western segment ====
New Hampshire Route 111A
- Location: Hollis–Nashua
- Length: 4.935 mi (7.942 km)

The western segment of NH 111A is a 4.935-mile-long (7.942 km) northeast–southwest loop road in Hollis and Nashua in Hillsborough County. The segment is signed east–west.

The eastern terminus is in Nashua at NH 111, west of the point where NH 111 and U.S. Route 3 meet. At that location, NH 111A is known as Main Dunstable Road. The western terminus is at NH 111 approximately 0.8 miles (1.3 km) north of the Massachusetts state line in Hollis. At that location, NH 111A is called South Depot Road.

==== Middle segment ====
New Hampshire Route 111A
- Location: Pelham–Windham
- Length: 9.173 mi (14.763 km)

The middle segment of NH 111A is a 9.173-mile-long (14.763 km) northeast–southwest highway between Pelham in Hillsborough County and Windham in Rockingham County. It is signed as an east–west highway.

The southern, officially western, terminus is in the town of Pelham at New Hampshire Route 128 (Mammoth Road) approximately 0.5 miles (0.80 km) north of the Massachusetts state line. At this point, the road is named Marsh Road. The northern, signed eastern, terminus of the highway is in the town of Windham at NH 111 between Cobbetts Pond and Canobie Lake. At this point, the road is known as Range Road.

==== Eastern segment ====
New Hampshire Route 111A
- Location: Danville–Exeter
- Length: 15.024 mi (24.179 km)

The eastern segment of NH 111A is a 15.024-mile-long (24.179 km) northeast–southwest highway between Danville and Exeter in Rockingham County. It is signed as an east–west highway.

The eastern terminus of this segment of NH 111A is in Exeter at NH 111 on the west side of String Bridge. At this location, NH 111A is named Water Street. There is a concurrency with NH 107 in Fremont. The western terminus is in Danville at NH 111. At that location, the road is known as Main Street.
