= NH 128 =

NH 128 may refer to:

- National Highway 128 (India)
- New Hampshire Route 128, United States
