= Chester Congregational Church =

Historic church in New Hampshire, United States

- U.S. National Register of Historic Places
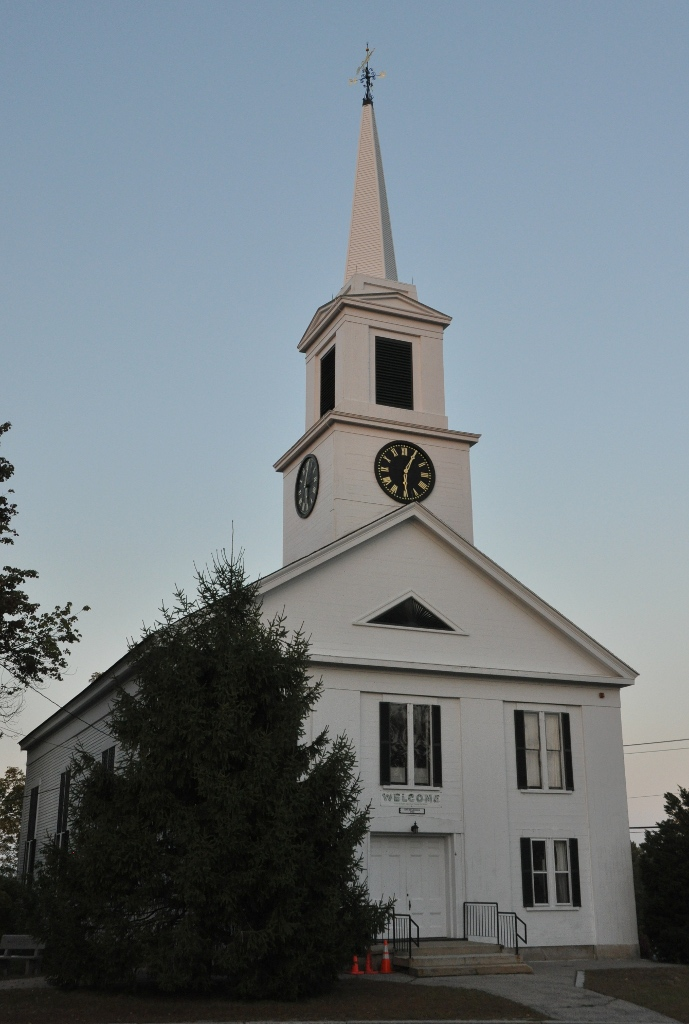

- Location within New Hampshire Location within the United States
- Location: 4 Chester St., Chester, New Hampshire
- Coordinates: 42°57′28″N 71°15′27″W
- Area: less than one acre
- Built: 1773
- Architect: John W. Noyes
- Architectural style: Greek Revival
- NRHP reference No.: 86001231
- Added to NRHP: June 05, 1986

Chester Congregational Church is a historic church at 4 Chester Street (New Hampshire Route 121) in Chester, New Hampshire. This wood-frame building was originally built as a traditional New England colonial meeting house in 1773, and underwent significant alteration in 1840, giving it its present Greek Revival appearance. It was listed on the National Register of Historic Places in 1986.

== Description and history ==
The Chester Congregational Church stands prominently at the center of Chester's main village, at the northwest corner of New Hampshire Route 121 and New Hampshire Route 102. It is a 1 1/2-story wood-frame structure, with a gabled roof, mostly clapboarded exterior, and split granite foundation. The front facade is three bays wide and finished in flushboard articulated by broad wooden piers. The main entrance, a double entry, is set in a recess in the center bay, with the other bays filled with paired narrow windows. The gable end above is fully pedimented, with a triangular louver at its center. A three-stage tower with clock and belfry rises to an octagonal spire. The clock was provided by E. Howard & Co., and the bell by George Handel Holbrook of Medway, Massachusetts. The interior has modest Greek Revival elements, including slip pews and a coved plaster ceiling.

The frame of the church was built in 1773, and underwent a major restyling in the 1840s. The church design is based on that of a church built in 1839 in nearby Candia. Most of its interior was lost during these alterations, but the original roof trusses and other features are still in evidence.

== See also ==
- National Register of Historic Places listings in Rockingham County, New Hampshire
