= NH 38 =

NH 38 may refer to:

- National Highway 38 (India)
- New Hampshire Route 38 (U.S.)
