= Mammoth Road =

North–south road in New England, U.S.

- Map of southern New Hampshire with Mammoth Road highlighted in solid red and of northern Massachusetts with Mammoth Road highlighted in dotted red

Route information
- Length: 29.3 mi (47.2 km)
- Component highways: NH 128; NH 28A

Major junctions
- South end: Pawtucket Street and School Street in Lowell, MA
- Route 113 in Lowell, MA; NH 111 in Windham, NH; NH 102 in Londonderry, NH; NH 28 / NH 28A in Londonderry, NH
- North end: US 3 / NH 28, Hooksett, NH

Location
- Country: United States
- States: Massachusetts, New Hampshire
- Counties: MA: Middlesex; NH: Hillsborough, Rockingham, Merrimack

Highway system
- Massachusetts State Highway System; Interstate; US; State; New Hampshire Highway System; Interstate; US; State; Turnpikes

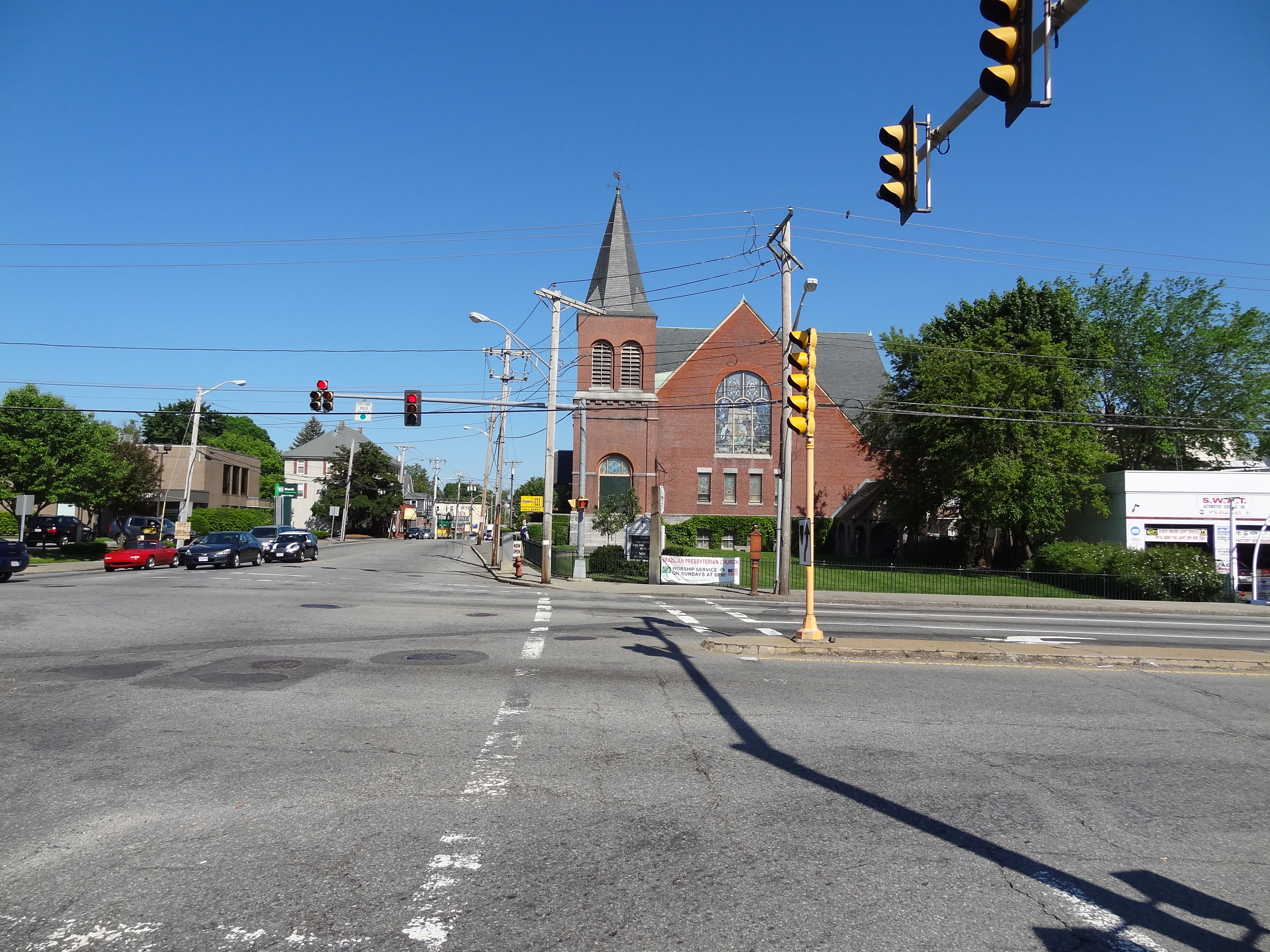
Looking north along Mammoth Road at its intersection with Riverside Street with Pawtucket Congregational Church visible

Mammoth Road is a north–south road in Massachusetts and New Hampshire. The road runs from its origin in Lowell, Massachusetts to its northern end in Hooksett, New Hampshire, a suburb of Manchester. The total length of the road is 29.3 miles (47.2 km). It was named "Mammoth" in the hope that the convenience of its directness and elimination of smaller connecting roads between thoroughfares would result in sufficient use and prestige as to "kill all the other roads".

== Route description ==
Mammoth Road begins in Middlesex County, in the center of Lowell, at an intersection with Pawtucket Street and School Street. This is located on the south bank of the Merrimack River, and near the campus of the University of Massachusetts Lowell. The road proceeds to cross over the river on the O'Donnell Bridge, and immediately intersects Route 113 (Riverside Street, Varnum Avenue), which leads to Tyngsboro in the west and Lawrence in the east. After intersecting, the road runs north into the town of Dracut, passing through an intersection with Nashua Road and Meghan Lane, and another one with Lakeview Avenue. The intersection with Lakeview Avenue is known as Costello Square, named after James F. Costello, who was a resident of Dracut lost in World War I. After passing through the square, the road leaves Massachusetts and crosses into the state of New Hampshire. Mammoth Road becomes New Hampshire Route 128 (NH 128), and enters the town of Pelham, which is in Hillsborough County.

In Pelham, Mammoth Road travels past an intersection with Sherburne Road, connecting to Hudson, and immediately comes to a Y Junction with NH 111A (Marsh Road), which leads to the center of Pelham. Further up, the road comes to an intersection with Keyes Hill Road and Tallant Road, before crossing the county line into Rockingham County and into the town of Windham.

While spending a short time in Windham, Mammoth Road does intersect NH 111 (Haverhill Road), which leads to the center of Hudson going westbound and the center of Windham going eastbound. After this intersection, the road enters the town of Londonderry, passing through its southern part before intersecting NH 102 (Nashua Road). This leads to Hudson going westbound and Derry going eastbound. Once through the intersection, the road passes through the center of Londonderry, and continues into the northern part of town, passing through an intersection with Litchfield Road and Stonehenge Road.

Shortly after, Mammoth Road merges with NH 28 (Rockingham Road), which leads to Derry going southbound, and the city of Manchester going northbound. This point is the northern terminus of NH 128. Rockingham Road continues north, while Mammoth Road veers to the left and parallels Rockingham Road. At the northern end of this stretch, Mammoth Road once again connects with Rockingham Road until NH 28A. At this point, Mammoth Road follows NH 28A and NH 28 becomes South Willow Street, heading north-northwest into downtown Manchester. Here, the road is South Mammoth Road.

Once in Manchester, South Mammoth Road passes by various communities before approaching an underpass with I-293 and NH 101. After passing under this, South Mammoth Road travels through the eastern side of downtown Manchester. The road has back-to-back intersections with Huse Road and Cilley Road. At this point, South Mammoth Road drops the "South" name and returns to Mammoth Road. The road then goes through several other intersections with Candia Road, Massabesic Street / Wayland Avenue, Lake Avenue, and Hanover Street. Once through these intersections, the road meets up with Bridge Street, which is a major east–west throughfare connecting to the center of downtown Manchester and I-93. After this stretch, the road exits downtown and merges with Smyth Road, which comes from the southwest. Mammoth Road then approaches an overpass with I-93. After passing over, Smyth Road breaks off and continues to the east, while Mammoth Road crosses the county line into Merrimack County and into the town of Hooksett.

Though originally slated to continue its northward track to Concord, Mammoth Road comes to its final intersection with US 3/NH 28, which leads back down to downtown Manchester going southbound, and up toward Concord going northbound.

== Major intersections ==
County	Location	mi	km	Destinations	Notes
Middlesex	Lowell	0.0	0.0	Pawtucket Street, School Street	Southern terminus of Mammoth Road
Middlesex	Lowell	0.2	0.32	Route 113 (Riverside Street, Varnum Ave) to Route 110 – Lawrence, Tyngsboro	
Middlesex	Dracut	1.7	2.7	Nashua Road, Meghan Lane	
Middlesex	Dracut	2.8	4.5	Lakeview Avenue	Costello Square
Massachusetts–New Hampshire state line		3.9	6.3	Southern terminus of NH 128; Southern end of NH 128 concurrency	
Hillsborough	Pelham	4.3	6.9	Sherburne Road	
Hillsborough	Pelham	4.5	7.2	NH 111A (Marsh Road) to NH 38 – Pelham, Salem	Western terminus of middle segment of NH 111A
Hillsborough	Pelham	9.4	15.1	Keyes Hill Road, Tallant Road	
Rockingham	Windham	11.7	18.8	NH 111 (Haverhill Road) – Hudson, Salem	
Rockingham	Londonderry	14.9	24.0	NH 102 (Nashua Road) to I-93 – Hudson, Derry	
Rockingham	Londonderry	20.0	32.2	NH 28 south (Rockingham Road) to I-93 – Derry	Northern end of NH 128 concurrency; northern terminus of NH 128
Rockingham	Londonderry	21.6	34.8	NH 28 north (South Willow Street) – Manchester	Southern end of NH 28A concurrency; southern terminus of NH 28A
Hillsborough	Manchester	24.5	39.4	Huse Road	
Hillsborough	Manchester	24.5	39.4	Cilley Road	South Mammoth Road becomes Mammoth Road
Hillsborough	Manchester	25.0	40.2	Candia Road to I-93 south	
Hillsborough	Manchester	25.0	40.2	Massabesic Street, Wayland Ave	
Hillsborough	Manchester	25.6	41.2	Lake Avenue	
Hillsborough	Manchester	25.6	41.2	Hanover Street	
Hillsborough	Manchester	26.2	42.2	Bridge Street to I-93 – Concord, Salem	
Hillsborough	Manchester	27.3	43.9	Smyth Road west	
Hillsborough	Manchester	27.5	44.3	Smyth Road east	
Merrimack	Hooksett	29.3	47.2	US 3 (Hooksett Road) / NH 28 – Manchester, Concord	Northern terminus of NH 28A
1.000 mi = 1.609 km; 1.000 km = 0.621 mi: Concurrency terminus
