= Hudson (CDP), New Hampshire =

Census-designated place in New Hampshire, United States

Hudson, New Hampshire
- Census-designated place
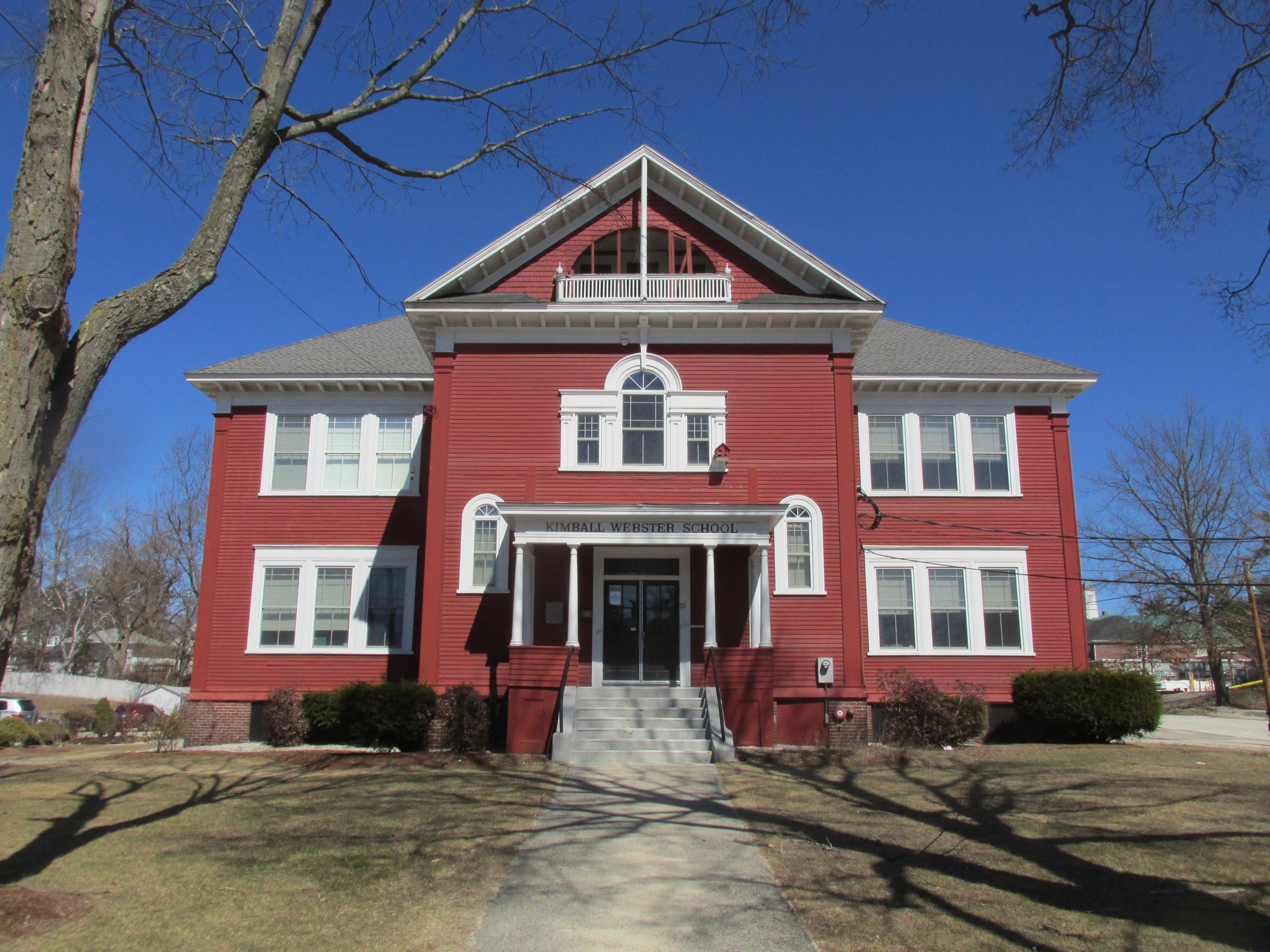
- Kimball Webster School

- Location within New Hampshire Location within the United States
- Coordinates: 42°45′53″N 71°26′23″W
- Country: United States
- State: New Hampshire
- County: Hillsborough
- Town: Hudson

Area
  - Total: 3.25 sq mi (8.43 km^{2})
  - Land: 3.07 sq mi (7.96 km^{2})
  - Water: 0.18 sq mi (0.47 km^{2})
- Elevation: 150 ft (46 m)

Population (2020)
  - Total: 7,534
  - Density: 2,450.1/sq mi (945.99/km^{2})
- Time zone: UTC-5 (Eastern (EST))
  - Summer (DST): UTC-4 (EDT)
- ZIP code: 03051
- Area code: 603
- FIPS code: 33-37860
- GNIS feature ID: 2378074

Hudson is a census-designated place (CDP) and the urban center of the town of Hudson, New Hampshire, United States. The population of the CDP was 7,534 at the 2020 census, out of 25,394 in the entire town.

== Geography ==
The CDP occupies the center part of the western side of the town of Hudson, along the eastern side of the Merrimack River, which also forms the Nashua city line. The CDP includes all of Hudson village, as well as a small portion of Hudson Center. The CDP extends north to a line running between Federal Street and Garrison Farm Road, then runs east so that it passes north of Elmwood Drive and Megan Drive. The northern border then runs south of Wagner Way, Joel Path, and Bonnie Lane, and north of Monroe Drive and Jackson Drive, until it reaches Greeley Street, the eastern extent of the CDP. The border runs south on Greeley Street, then west on New Hampshire Route 111, then south on Belknap Road and Melendy Road. The border turns west to follow Pelham Road, then turns south on New Hampshire Route 3A (Lowell Road) to Third Brook, which it follows west to the Merrimack.

Route 111 is the main east–west road through the CDP, leading west across the Merrimack River into Nashua and east 9 miles (14 km) to Interstate 93 in Windham. Route 3A runs north from Hudson 17 miles (27 km) to Manchester and southeast 14 miles (23 km) to Lowell, Massachusetts. New Hampshire Route 102 begins in Hudson and leads northeast 10 miles (16 km) to Derry.

According to the U.S. Census Bureau, the Hudson CDP has a total area of 3.2 square miles (8.4 km^{2}), of which 3.1 square miles (8.0 km^{2}) are land and 0.2 square miles (0.5 km^{2}), or 5.57%, are water. Besides the Merrimack River, the CDP contains Ottarnic Pond in the east.

== Demographics ==
Historical population
Census	Pop.	Note	%±
1950	2,382		—
1960	3,651		53.3%
1980	6,248		—
1990	7,626		22.1%
2000	7,814		2.5%
2010	7,336		−6.1%
2020	7,534		2.7%
U.S. Decennial Census

As of the census of 2010, there were 7,336 people, 2,924 households, and 1,968 families residing in the CDP. There were 3,055 housing units, of which 131, or 4.3%, were vacant. The racial makeup of the CDP was 93.8% white, 1.5% African American, 0.1% Native American, 1.6% Asian, 0.04% Pacific Islander, 1.3% some other race, and 1.6% from two or more races. 3.9% of the population were Hispanic or Latino of any race.

Of the 2,924 households in the CDP, 32.1% had children under the age of 18 living with them, 49.0% were headed by married couples living together, 12.8% had a female householder with no husband present, and 32.7% were non-families. 25.3% of all households were made up of individuals, and 7.8% were someone living alone who was 65 years of age or older. The average household size was 2.51, and the average family size was 3.01.

22.2% of residents in the CDP were under the age of 18, 8.1% were from age 18 to 24, 28.6% were from 25 to 44, 29.1% were from 45 to 64, and 12.1% were 65 years of age or older. The median age was 39.8 years. For every 100 females, there were 97.2 males. For every 100 females age 18 and over, there were 95.6 males.

For the period 2011–15, the estimated median annual income for a household was $66,368, and the median income for a family was $72,879. Male full-time workers had a median income of $50,469 versus $39,980 for females. The per capita income for the CDP was $31,650. 8.2% of the population and 4.7% of families were below the poverty line, along with 15.8% of people under the age of 18 and 6.3% of people 65 or older.
