= New Hampshire Route 128 =

State highway in southeastern New Hampshire, US

New Hampshire Route 128
- Map of southern New Hampshire with NH 128 highlighted in red

Route information
- Maintained by NHDOT
- Length: 16.059 mi (25.844 km)

Major junctions
- South end: Mammoth Road in Dracut, MA
- NH 111 in Windham; NH 102 in Londonderry
- North end: NH 28 in Londonderry

Location
- Country: United States
- State: New Hampshire
- Counties: Hillsborough, Rockingham

Highway system
- New Hampshire Highway System; Interstate; US; State; Turnpikes
← NH 127	→ NH 129

New Hampshire Route 128 (abbreviated NH 128) is a 16.059-mile-long (25.844 km) north–south highway in southeastern New Hampshire. NH 128 runs from the Massachusetts border in Pelham northward to Londonderry, south of Manchester. NH 128 is named Mammoth Road throughout its entire length.

The southern terminus of NH 128 is at the Massachusetts state line in the town of Pelham, where the road continues into Massachusetts as an unnumbered road in the town of Dracut. The road is still named Mammoth Road in Dracut. The northern terminus is at New Hampshire Route 28 in Londonderry. Mammoth Road continues northward along NH 28 and then New Hampshire Route 28A.

== Major intersections ==
County	Location	mi	km	Destinations	Notes
Hillsborough	Pelham	0.000	0.000	Mammoth Road – Dracut	Massachusetts–New Hampshire state line
Hillsborough	Pelham	0.546	0.879	NH 111A east – Pelham, Salem	Western terminus of the middle segment of NH 111A
Rockingham	Windham	7.759	12.487	NH 111 – Hudson, Salem	
Rockingham	Londonderry	10.981	17.672	NH 102 to I-93 – Hudson, Derry	
Rockingham	Londonderry	16.059	25.844	NH 28 to I-93 – Manchester, Derry	
1.000 mi = 1.609 km; 1.000 km = 0.621 mi
