= Londonderry, New Hampshire =

Town in New Hampshire, United States

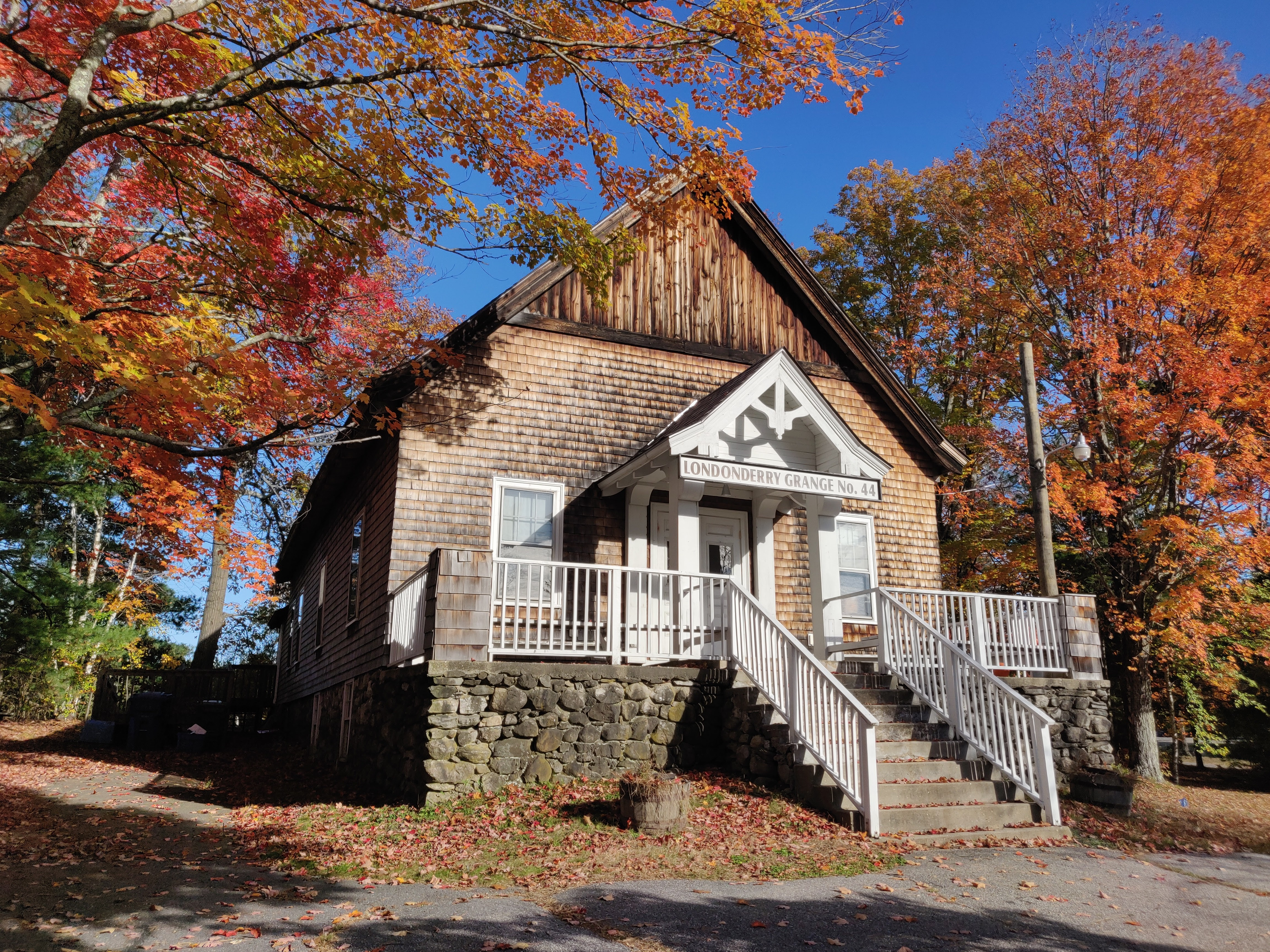
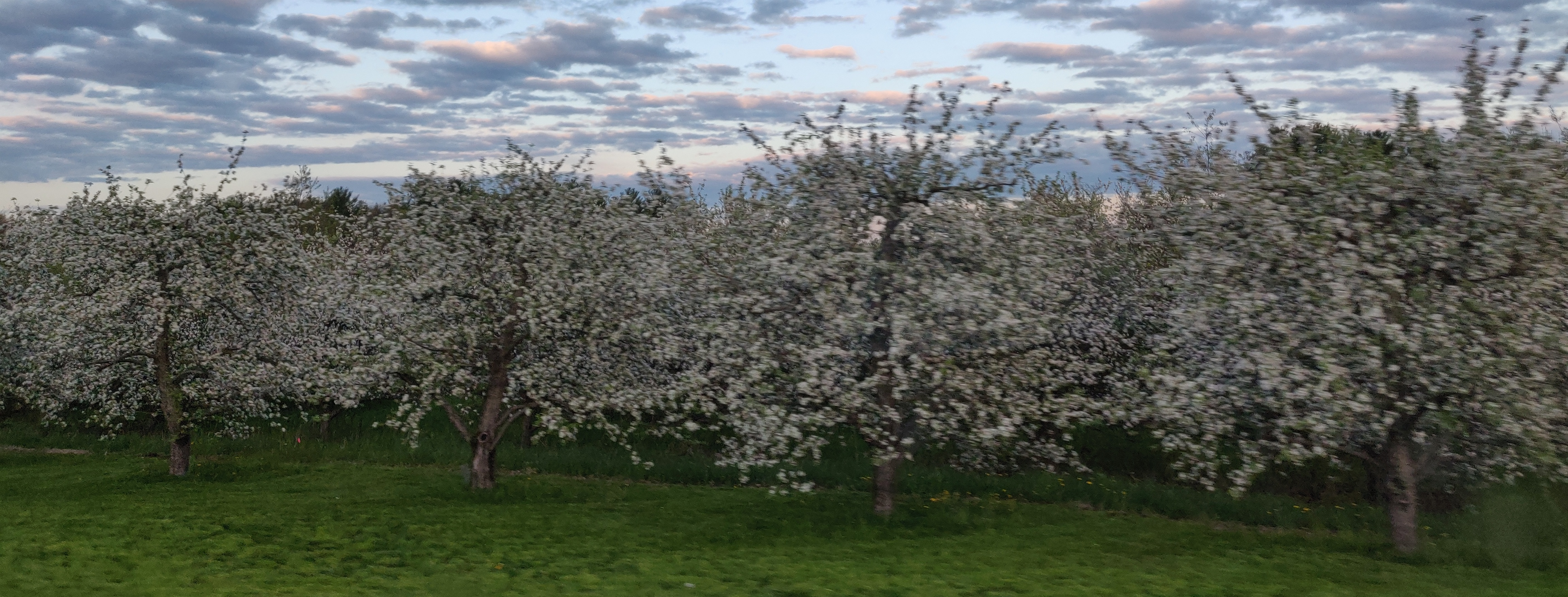
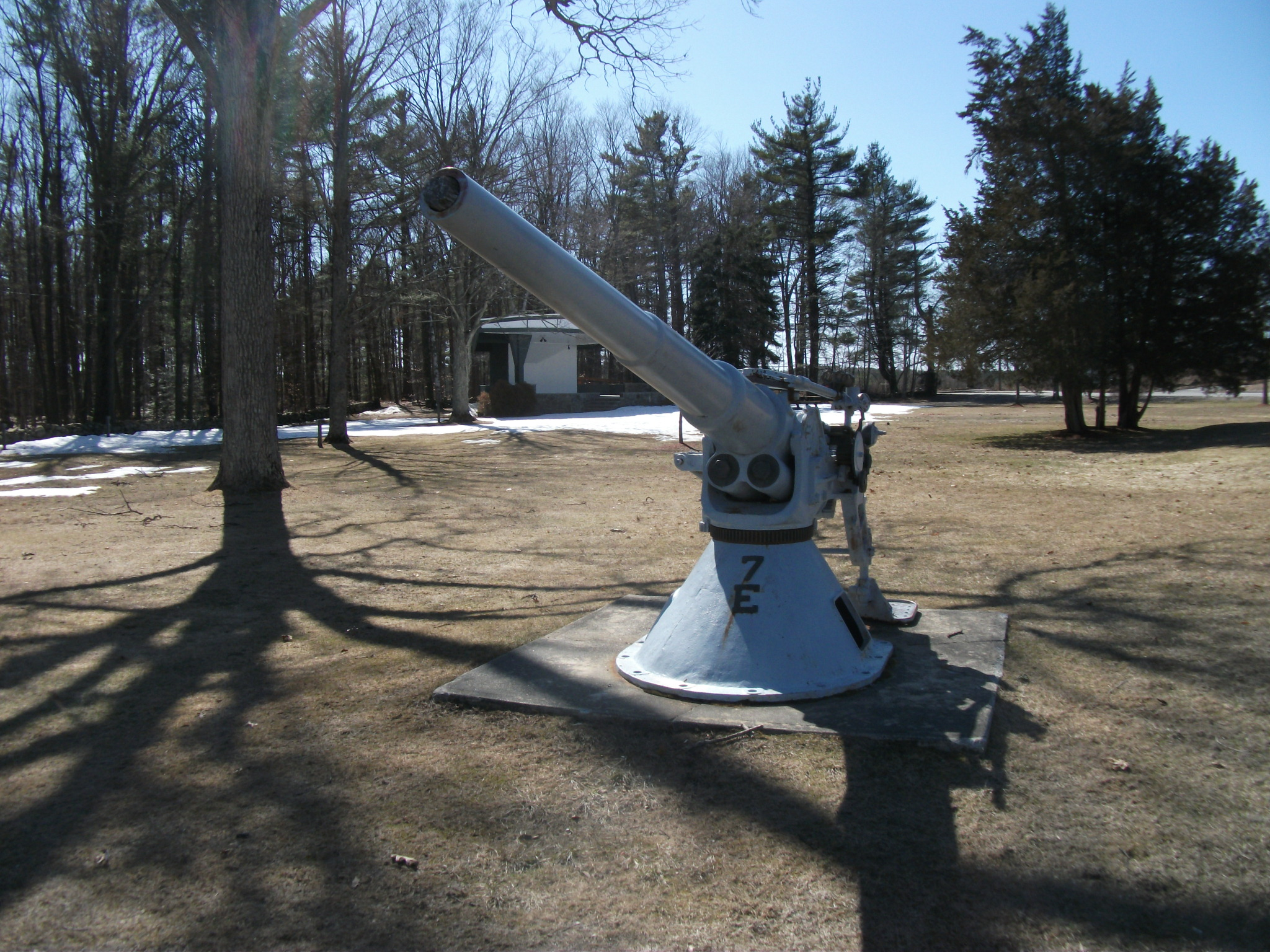
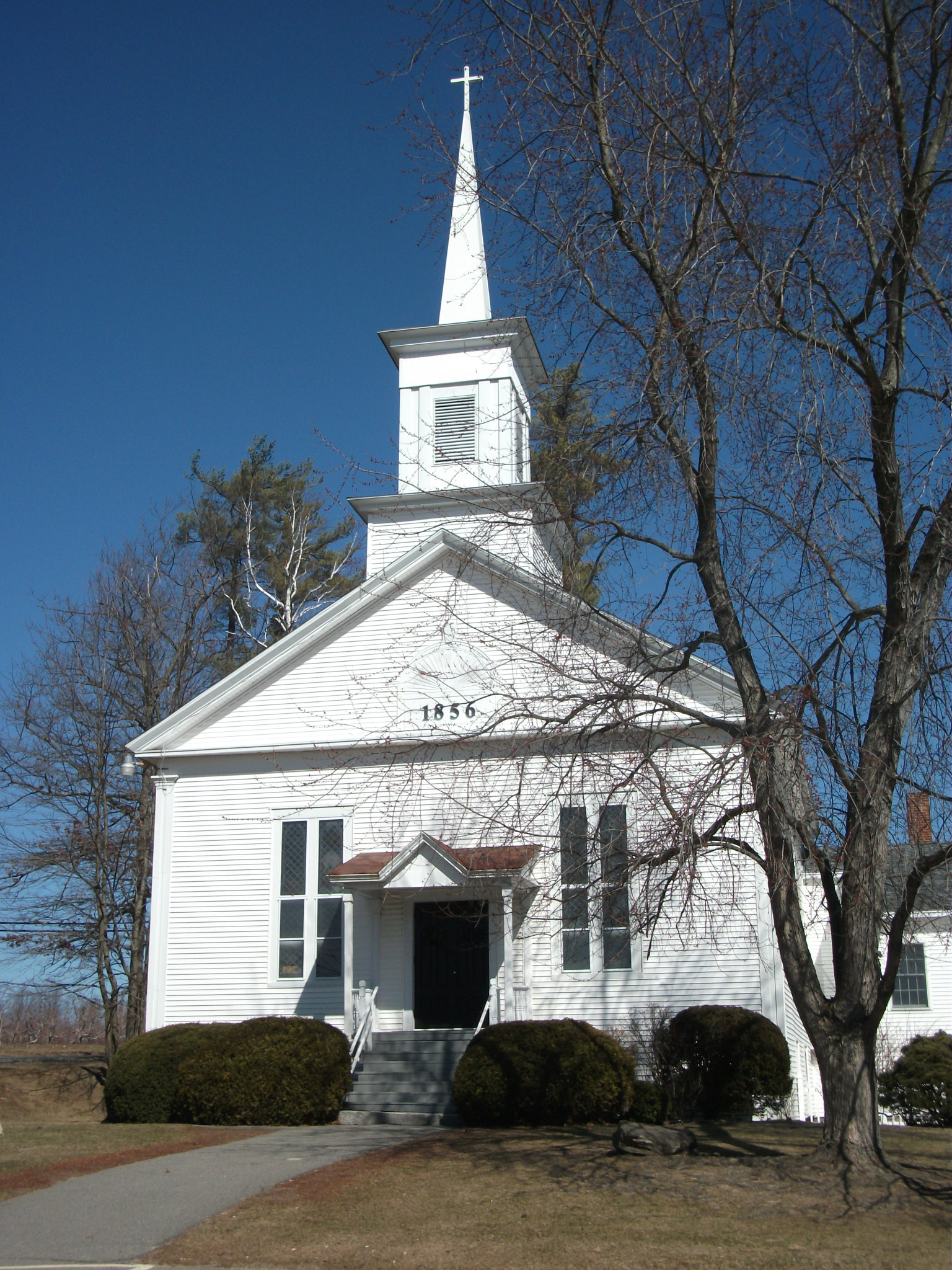
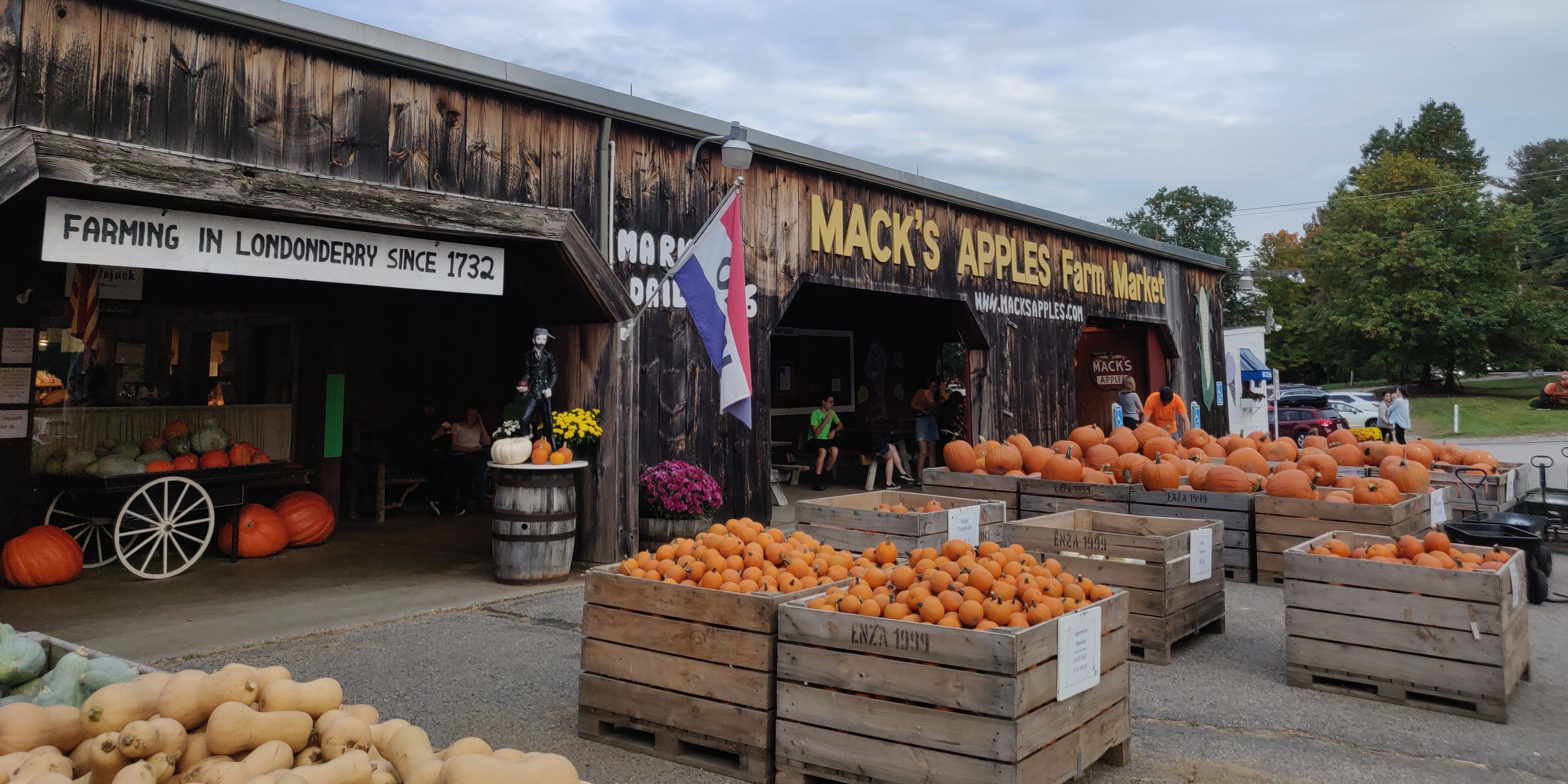
- From top, left to right: Londonderry Grange #44, Mack's Apples blossoms, gun on the town common, Londonderry United Methodist Church, Mack's Apples farm market

- Seal

- Location in Rockingham County and the state of New Hampshire
- Coordinates: 42°52′47″N 71°22′56″W
- Country: United States
- State: New Hampshire
- County: Rockingham
- Incorporated: 1722
- Villages: Londonderry; North Londonderry; Wilson

Area
  - Total: 42.1 sq mi (109.1 km^{2})
  - Land: 42.0 sq mi (108.8 km^{2})
  - Water: 0.12 sq mi (0.3 km^{2}) 0.30%
- Elevation: 345 ft (105 m)

Population (2020)
  - Total: 25,826
  - Density: 615/sq mi (237.4/km^{2})
- Time zone: UTC-5 (Eastern)
  - Summer (DST): UTC-4 (Eastern)
- ZIP code: 03053
- Area code: 603
- FIPS code: 33-43220
- GNIS feature ID: 873651
- Website: www.londonderrynh.gov

Londonderry is a town in western Rockingham County, New Hampshire, United States. It sits between Manchester and Derry, the largest and fourth-largest communities in the state. The population was 25,826 at the 2020 census. Londonderry is known for its apple orchards and is home to the headquarters of Stonyfield Farm and part of Manchester–Boston Regional Airport.

The more densely settled portion of town, where 11,645 people lived at the 2020 census, is defined as the Londonderry census-designated place (CDP) and roughly occupies the southeastern and southern parts of town, around New Hampshire Route 102.

== History ==
=== Early history ===
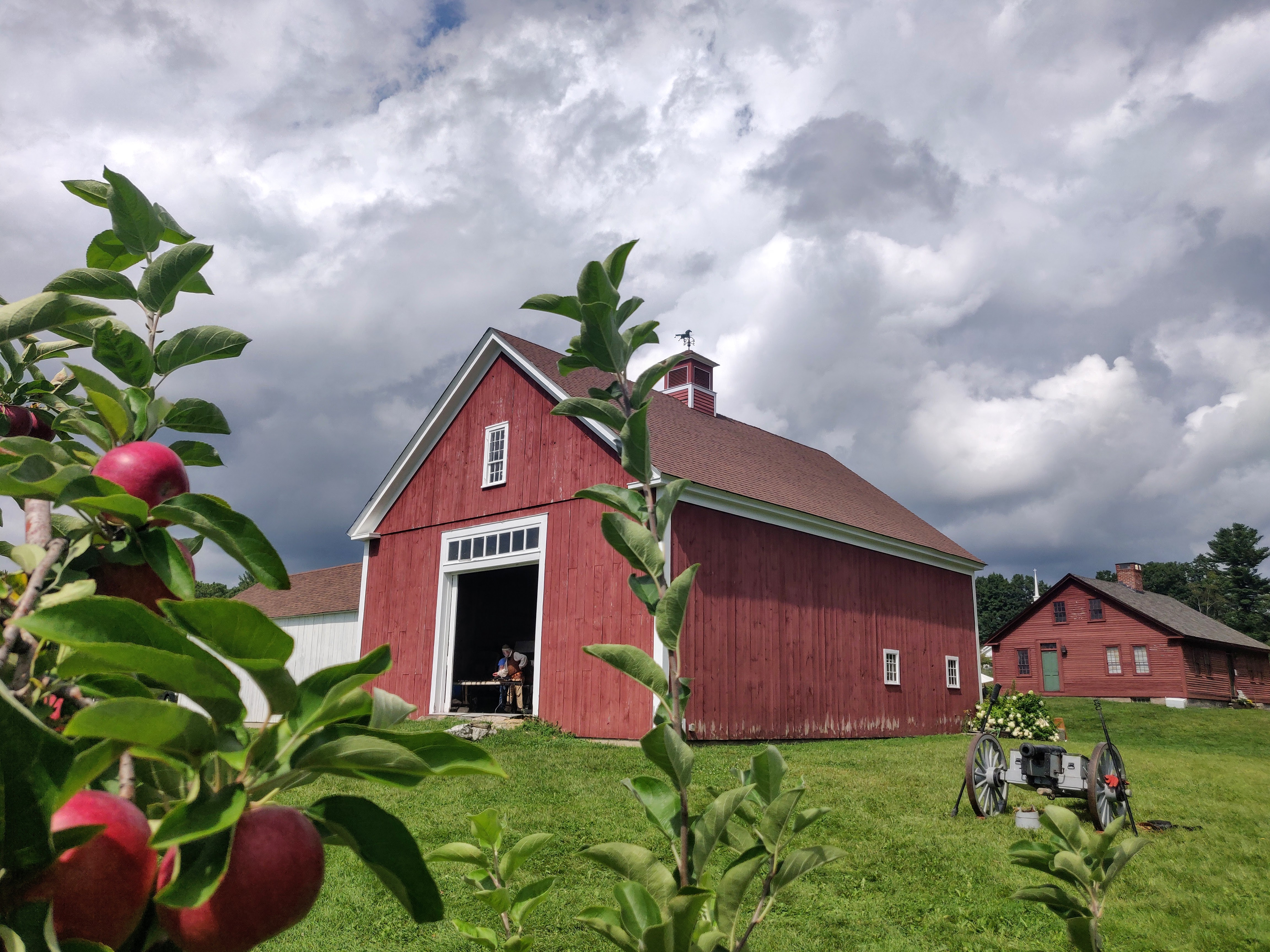
The Morrison House Museum, home of the Londonderry Historical Society

Londonderry lies in an area that was first known as "Nutfield" because of the dense woods with nut trees. A petition for the town was submitted to the General Court of the Province of New Hampshire on September 23, 1719. That petition stated that the petitioners had settled "at Nutfield about the Eleventh of Aprile last"—i.e. April 11, 1719. That petition requested "ten miles square" and stated that there were now about seventy families and inhabitants from both Ireland and New England. On June 21, 1722, the town was chartered and given the name "Londonderry", after Londonderry in the province of Ulster in the north of Ireland. The grant made by Samuel Shute, Governor of the province of New Hampshire, was for a tract of land described as follows:

"Beginning on the North East Angle at a Beach Tree marked which is the south East angle of Chester and Running from thence due South on Kingstown Line four miles and an half and from thence on a West Line one mile and three Quarters and from thence South six miles and an half and from thence West north West nine miles and an half, and from thence North Eleven miles and an half from thence north north East Three miles from thence East South East one mile and from thence South South West to the South West Angle of Chester and from thence on an East Line Bounding on Chester Ten miles unto the Beach Tree first mentioned.”

The town was divided into two parishes on February 25, 1739/40. Windham was set off and incorporated on February 12, 1741/42. The northwest portion, with other land, was incorporated as Derryfield, now Manchester, on September 3, 1751. Derry was incorporated on July 2, 1827. Border adjustments and annexations were made throughout this period continuing until June 27, 1857, when the line with Hudson (formerly known as Nottingham West) was established.

In 1719, the first North American potato was grown in Derry, then a part of Londonderry.

Approval of the petition submitted to the province of New Hampshire required the petitioners to obtain an agreement from Col. John Wheelwright for the sale of the land. He held claim to it based on a grant to his grandfather. That agreement was obtained on October 12, 1719, and included a statement of the bounds, extending west as far as the Merrimack River. This conflicted with a grant for the town of Dunstable, now Nashua, made by the Massachusetts Bay Colony in 1673. The provincial line between Massachusetts and New Hampshire was not settled in its present location until 1741. Thus when Londonderry was granted, the westernmost portion actually lay within the Dunstable grant and the Province of Massachusetts Bay. The resulting land conflicts with "Dunstable encroachers" were still being dealt with by the town in 1783 and 1791. Private owners were resolving these conflicts between each other as late as 1812.

The first U.S. census, conducted in 1790, reported the town's population to be 2,622.

=== 19th century to World War II ===
The Manchester and Lawrence Railroad was opened in November 1849, with depots at North Londonderry, Wilson's Crossing, Derry and Windham. Two months later, on January 26, 1850, Dearborn Whittier, a prominent resident, was hit and killed by a railroad car at Wilson's Crossing. On March 12 the town voted to require gates at all crossings, although the issue persisted for a few more years.

The Manchester and Derry Street Railroad, sometimes referred to as the Derry and Manchester Street Railroad or trolley car, opened in December 1907 and operated between Broadway in Derry and Elm Street in Manchester until August 1926.

Antique postcards

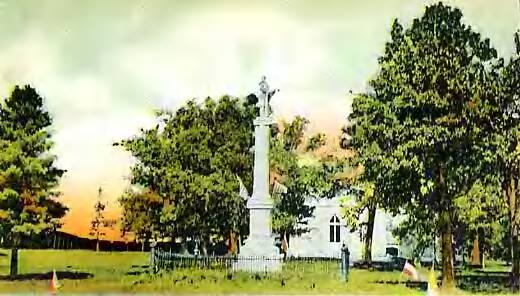
Civil War Soldiers' Monument c. 1905

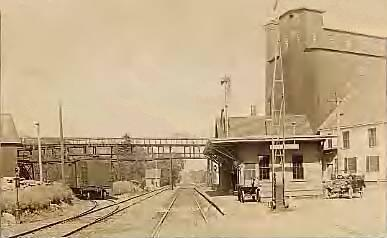
Railroad Station in 1914

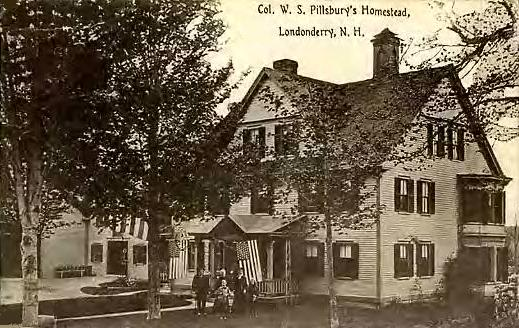
Col. W. S. Pillsbury residence c. 1910

=== Postwar history ===
Suburbanization after World War II, particularly the construction of Interstate 93, led to the town's growth.

=== 21st century ===
The COVID-19 pandemic created divisions in Londonderry, including heated controversy around whether or not to adopt a mask mandate in the town's schools.

== Geography ==
Londonderry is the westernmost municipality in Rockingham County. It is bordered by the towns of Auburn to the northeast, Derry to the east, and Windham to the southeast, all in Rockingham County, and by Hudson to the south, Litchfield to the west, and Manchester to the north, in Hillsborough County. According to the United States Census Bureau, the town has a total area of 42.1 square miles (109.1 km^{2}), of which 42.0 square miles (108.7 km^{2}) are land and 0.1 square miles (0.3 km^{2}) are water, comprising 0.30% of the town.

The town of Londonderry is drained on the east and south by Beaver Brook and on the west by Little Cohas Brook, Watts Brook, Colby Brook and Nesenkeag Brook, all of which flow to the Merrimack River. The town's highest point is 535 feet (163 m) above sea level, on Number Eight Hill (named after the old school house that used to be on it) north of the center of town.

The town is crossed by Interstate 93, New Hampshire Route 102, New Hampshire Route 128, and New Hampshire Route 28. Half of Manchester–Boston Regional Airport, including the main terminal, is in the northwest corner of the town.

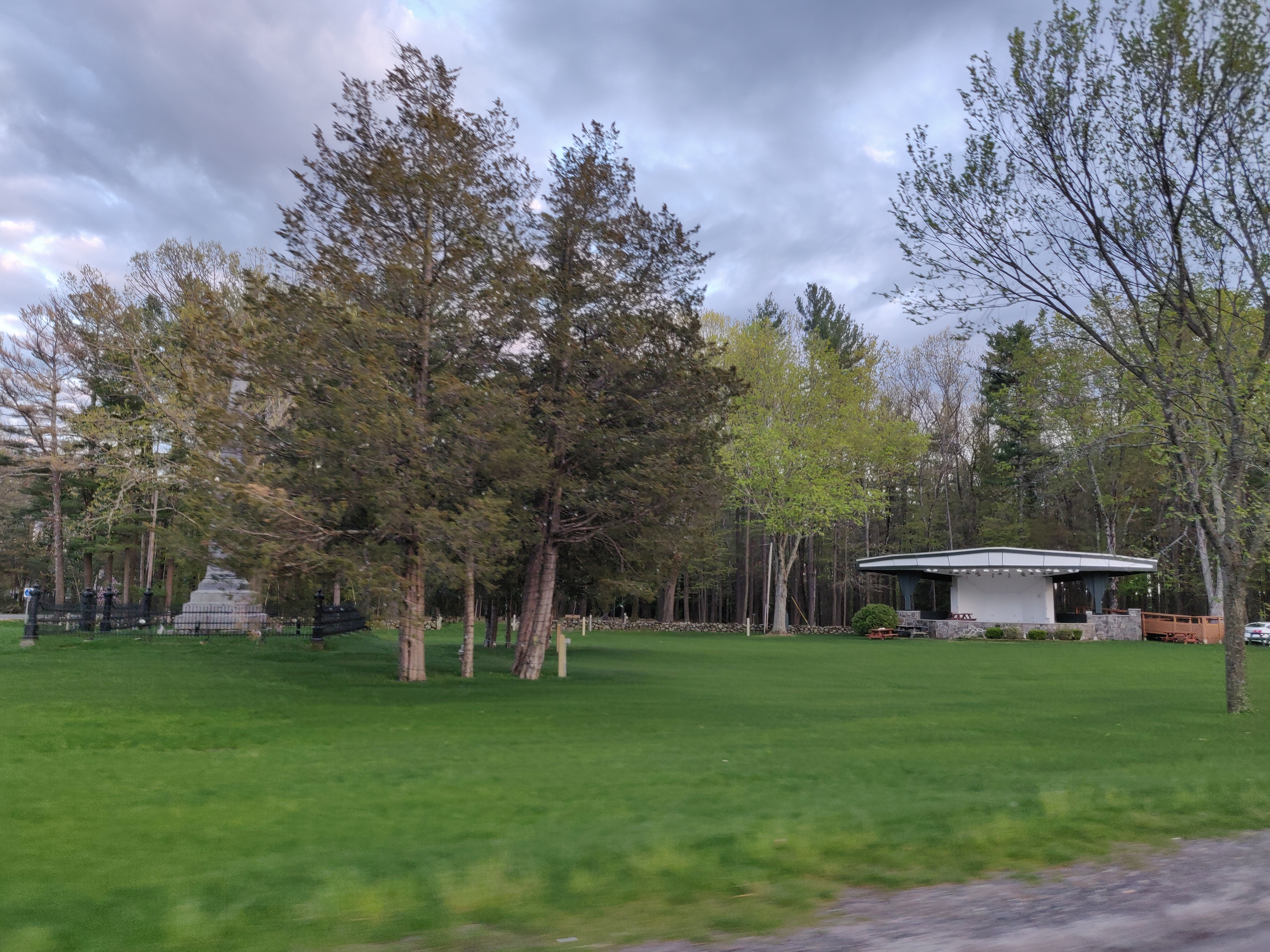
The Londonderry town common

Though Londonderry has grown to become one of the larger towns, by population, in the state, it lacks any concentrated downtown area, central business district, or town center. Historically, no village had developed in Londonderry, as it was largely a rural farming area. Population growth in the town only began in the 1970s, when the construction of I-93 turned Londonderry into a bedroom community and exurb for the Greater Boston area. The major retail district lies in the town's southeastern corner near where NH 102 interchanges with I-93, with smaller commercial districts lying at the intersection of NH 128 and NH 102, and near where NH 28 and NH 128 merge. The Londonderry census-designated place, covering the commercial districts listed above and neighboring residential areas, includes all land in the town south of NH 102 as well as land east of NH 128 as far north as Stonehenge Road. The Town Hall and schools are built near the geographic center of the town along an otherwise rural stretch of NH 128.

=== Adjacent municipalities ===
- Manchester (north)
- Auburn (northeast)
- Derry (east)
- Windham (southeast)
- Hudson (south)
- Litchfield (west)

=== Climate ===
Londonderry has a four-season humid continental climate (Köppen Dfa), with long, cold, snowy winters, and very warm and somewhat humid summers; spring and fall in between are crisp and relatively brief transitions. Precipitation is well-spread throughout the year, including snowfall in the winter.

== Demographics ==
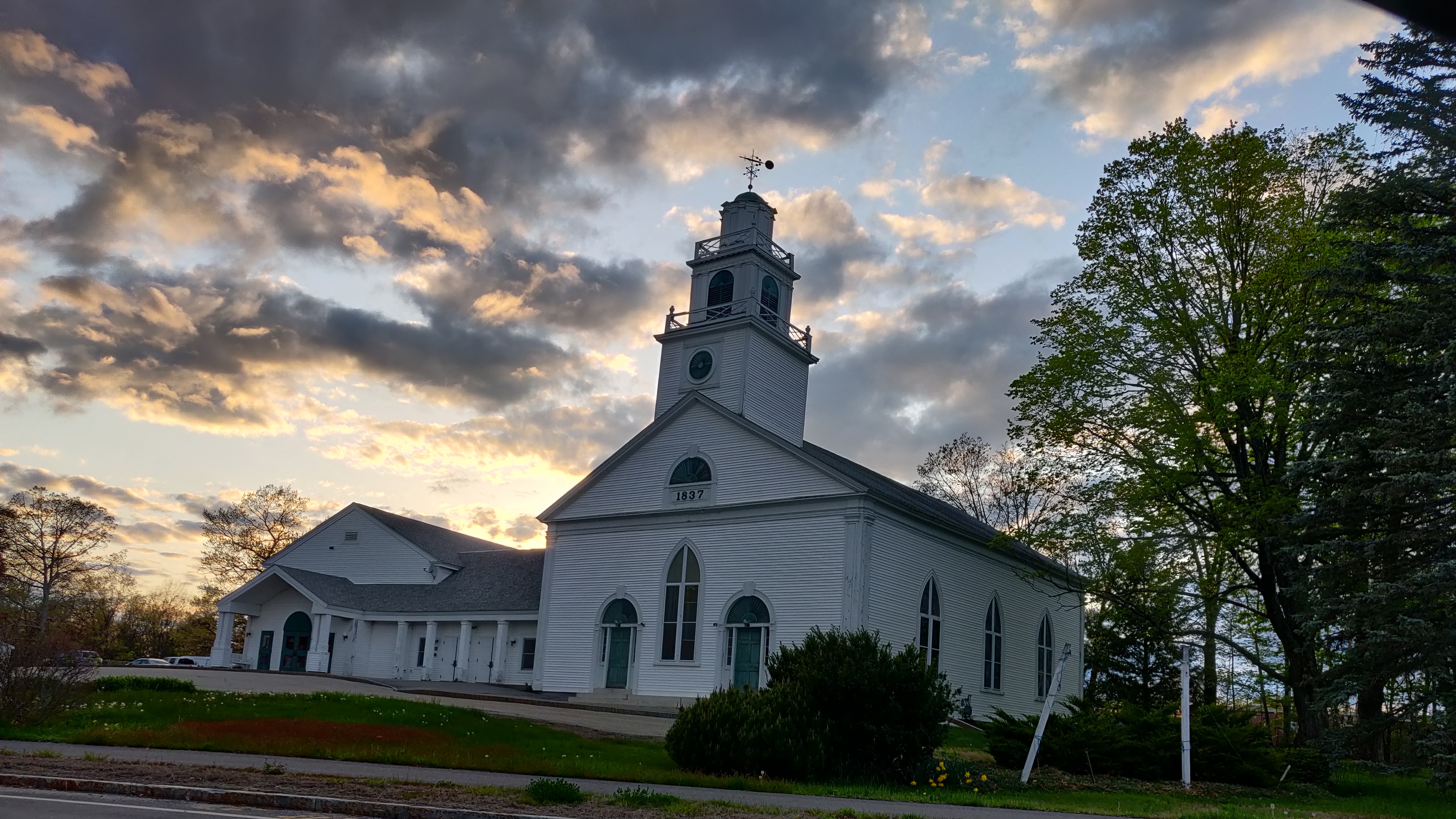
Londonderry Presbyterian Church at sunset

Historical population
Census	Pop.	Note	%±
1790	2,622		—
1800	2,650		1.1%
1810	2,766		4.4%
1820	3,127		13.1%
1830	1,469		−53.0%
1840	1,556		5.9%
1850	1,731		11.2%
1860	1,717		−0.8%
1870	1,405		−18.2%
1880	1,363		−3.0%
1890	1,220		−10.5%
1900	1,408		15.4%
1910	1,533		8.9%
1920	1,303		−15.0%
1930	1,373		5.4%
1940	1,429		4.1%
1950	1,640		14.8%
1960	2,457		49.8%
1970	5,346		117.6%
1980	13,598		154.4%
1990	19,781		45.5%
2000	23,236		17.5%
2010	24,129		3.8%
2020	25,826		7.0%
U.S. Decennial Census

As of the 2020 census, there were 25,826 people, 9,569 households, and 7,422 families residing in the town. The population density was 613.4 inhabitants per square mile (236.8/km^{2}). There were 9,849 housing units at an average density of 233.9 per square mile (90.3/km^{2}). The racial makeup of the town was 93.2% White, 0.8% Black or African American, >0.1% Native American or Alaska Native, 1.9% Asian, >0.01% Pacific Islander, 0.3% some other race, and 3.6% from two or more races. Hispanic or Latino of any race were 3.7% of the population.

There were 9,569 households, out of which 36.9% had children under the age of 18 living with them, 64.1% were headed by married couples living together, 21.6% had a female householder with no husband present, 8.5% had a male householder with no wife present, and 11.2% of households were an individual 65 or older. The average household size was 2.74, and the average family size was 3.12.

In the town, the population was spread out, with 24.9% under the age of 20, 7.4% from 20 to 24, 22.1% from 25 to 44, 32.2% from 45 to 64, and 14.9% who were 65 years of age or older. The median age was 42.5 years. For every 100 females, there were 97.5 males. For every 100 females age 18 and over, there were 92.3 males.

For the period 2016–2019, the estimated median annual income for a household in the town was $110,810, and the median income for a family was $124,792. The per capita income for the town was $46,674. About 2.0% of the population were below the poverty line, including 3.4% of those under age 18 and 3.2% of those age 65 or over.

== Economy ==
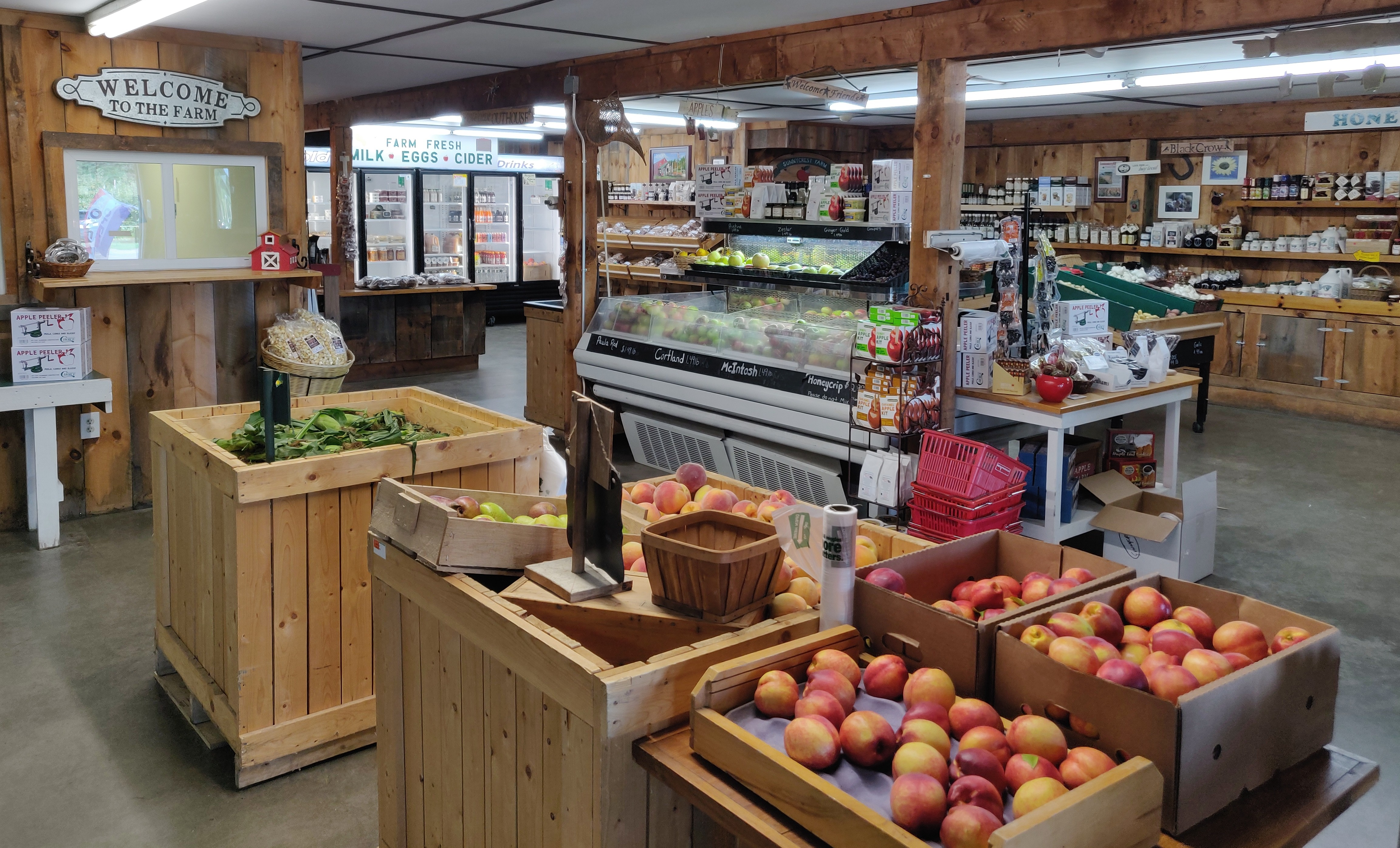
Sunnycrest Farm market

Londonderry is home to numerous businesses, many of which are located in the northern part of the town near Manchester–Boston Regional Airport (MHT), or in the southeastern part of town near I-93, on NH 102. Major businesses headquartered in town include Stonyfield Farm and Blue Seal Feeds; a bottling facility of the Coca-Cola Bottling Co. is also located in town. The town is also home to numerous chain retailers.

Mack's Apples, Sunnycrest Farm, and Elwood Orchards are among the several orchards in town and are emblematic of the town's important farming heritage. The abundance of apple orchards in town has made apple picking a popular fall activity among all residents.

One former apple orchard is currently being transformed into a 600-acre commercial and residential development to be known as Woodmont Commons.

== Infrastructure ==
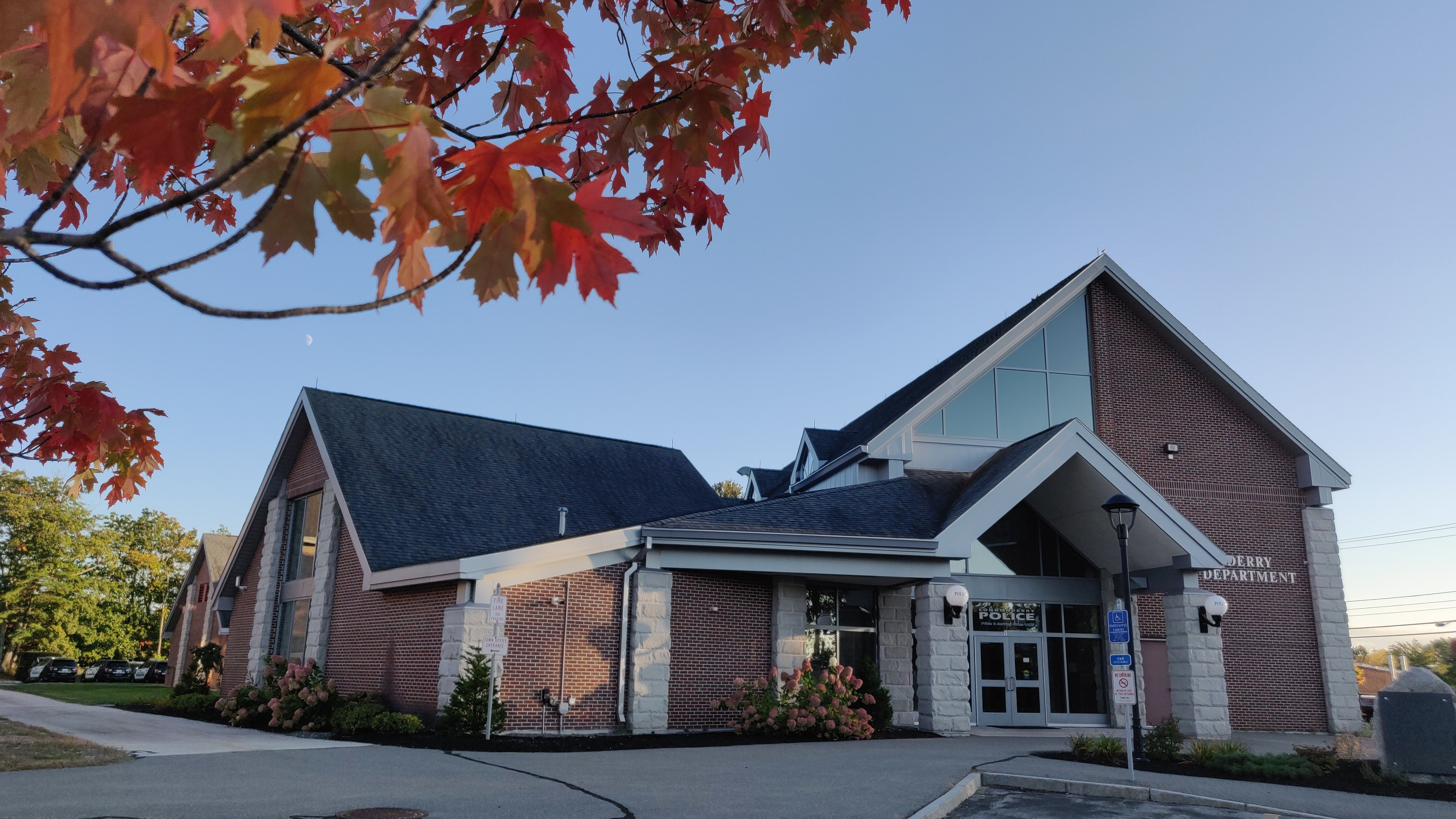
The Londonderry Police Department

Londonderry has its own fire department and police department.

=== Transportation ===
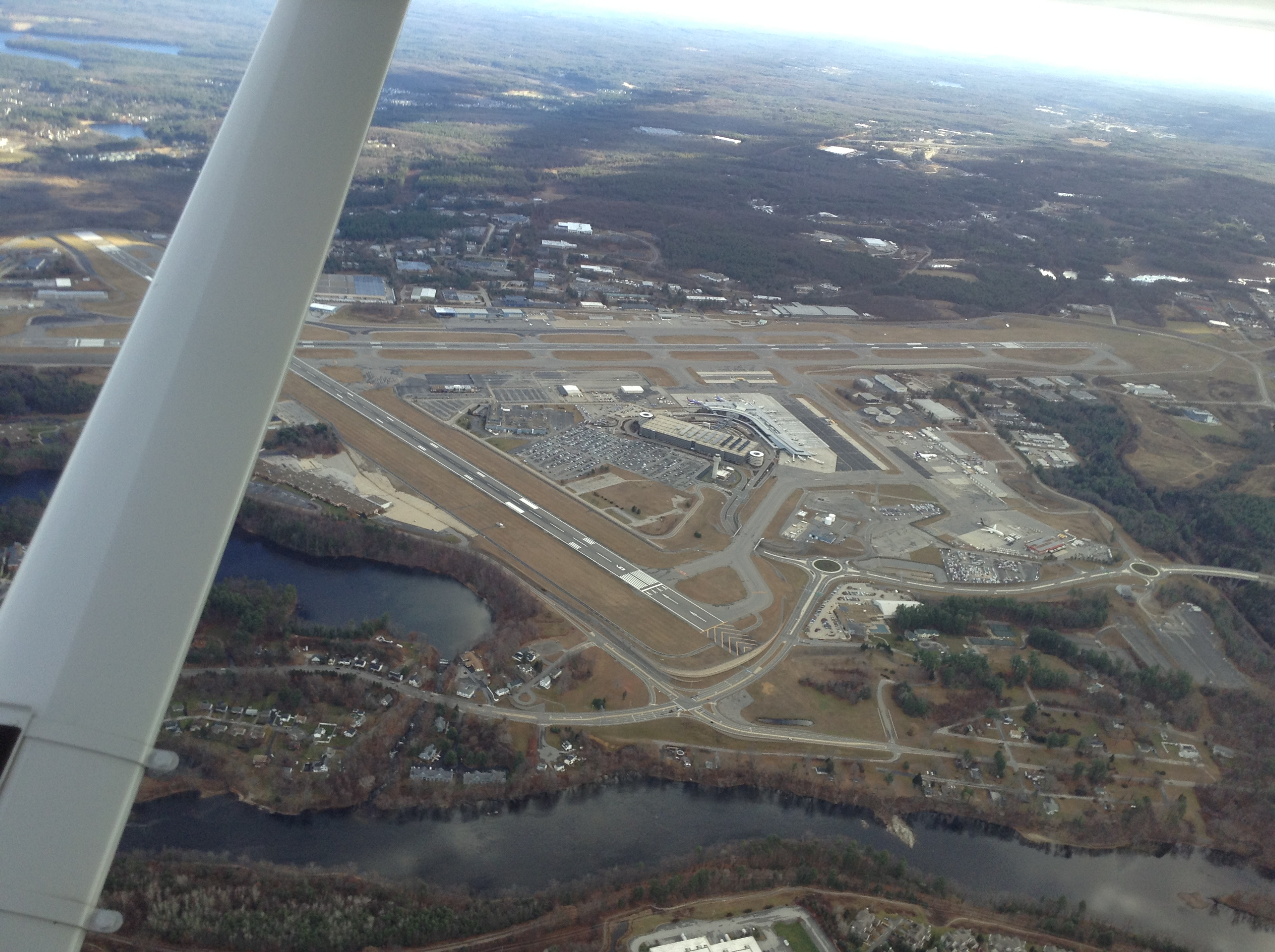
The Manchester–Boston Regional Airport is located mostly in Londonderry.

Londonderry is crossed by three New Hampshire state highways and one Interstate Highway.

- NH 28 crosses North Londonderry, entering the town from Derry in the east and leaving the town into Manchester in the north. NH 28 is known locally as Rockingham Road when it enters from Derry, and merges with Mammoth Road at the northern terminus of NH 128.
- NH 102 crosses South Londonderry, entering the town from Hudson in the southwest corner, and leaving the town into Derry in the east. NH 102 is known locally as Nashua Road.
- NH 128 is the main north–south route through Londonderry, entering from Windham in the south and terminating at NH 28 in North Londonderry. It is known locally as Mammoth Road.
- Interstate 93 crosses the eastern side of Londonderry from south to north. There are two exits to access Londonderry: Exit 4 (NH 102) and Exit 5 (NH 28).

Londonderry is partially home to the Manchester–Boston Regional Airport which it shares with the city of Manchester. There is no passenger rail service in Londonderry.

== Government and politics ==
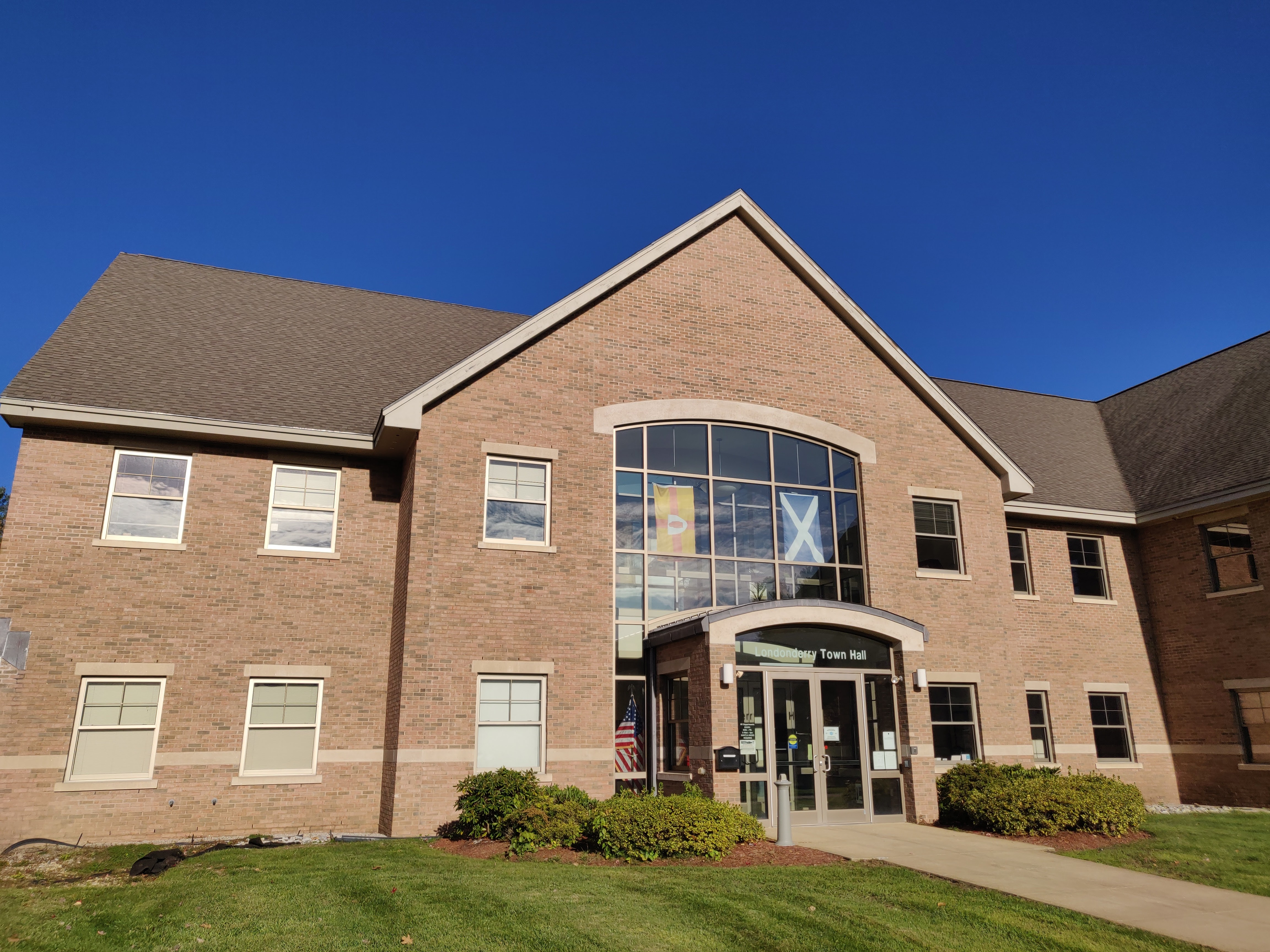
Londonderry Town Hall

Londonderry is part of New Hampshire's 1st congressional district, currently represented by Democrat Chris Pappas. Londonderry is part of the Executive Council of New Hampshire's 4th district, currently represented by Republican Ted Gatsas. The town is part of New Hampshire's 14th State Senate district, currently represented by Republican Sharon Carson.

== Education ==
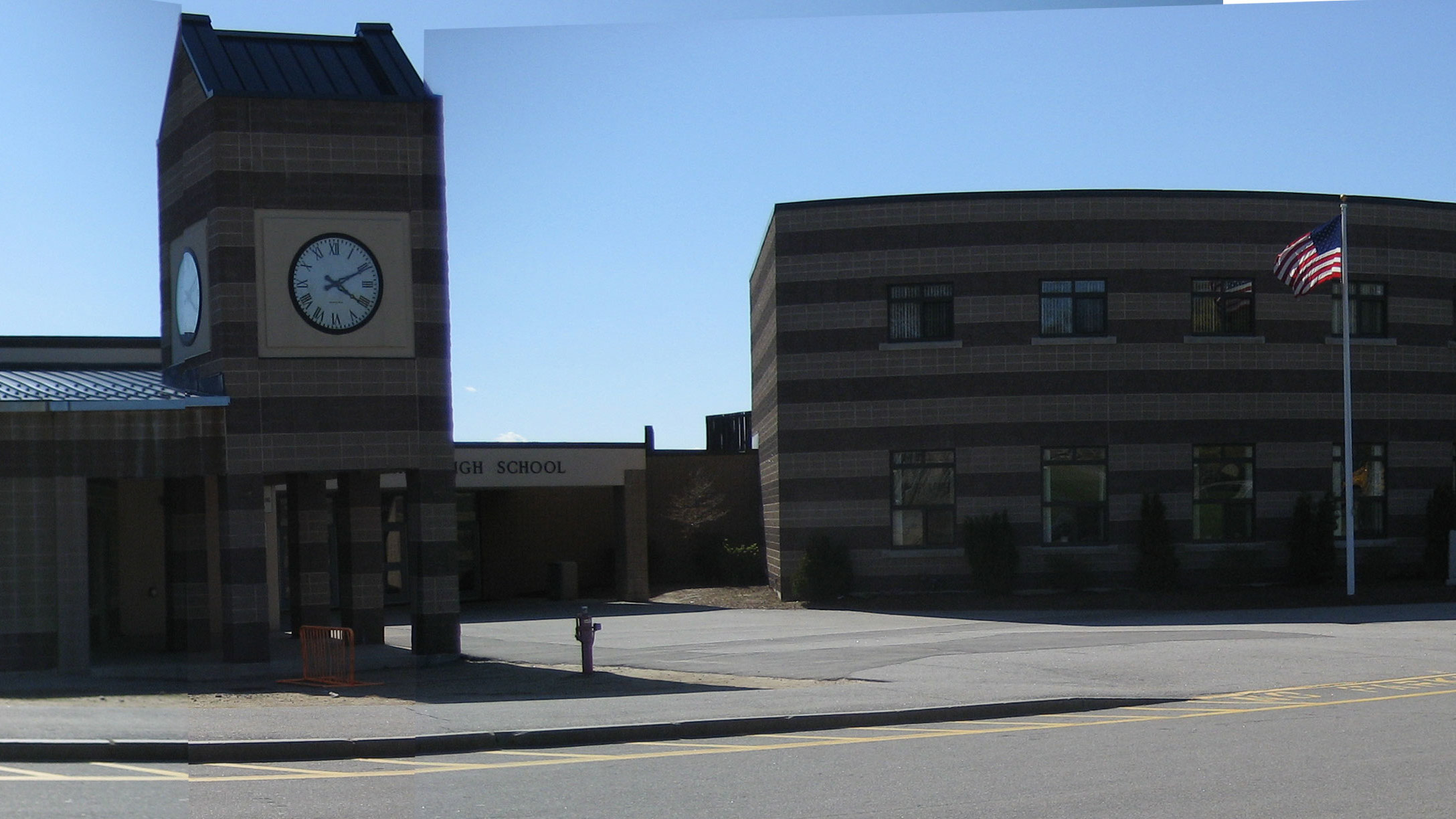
Londonderry High School

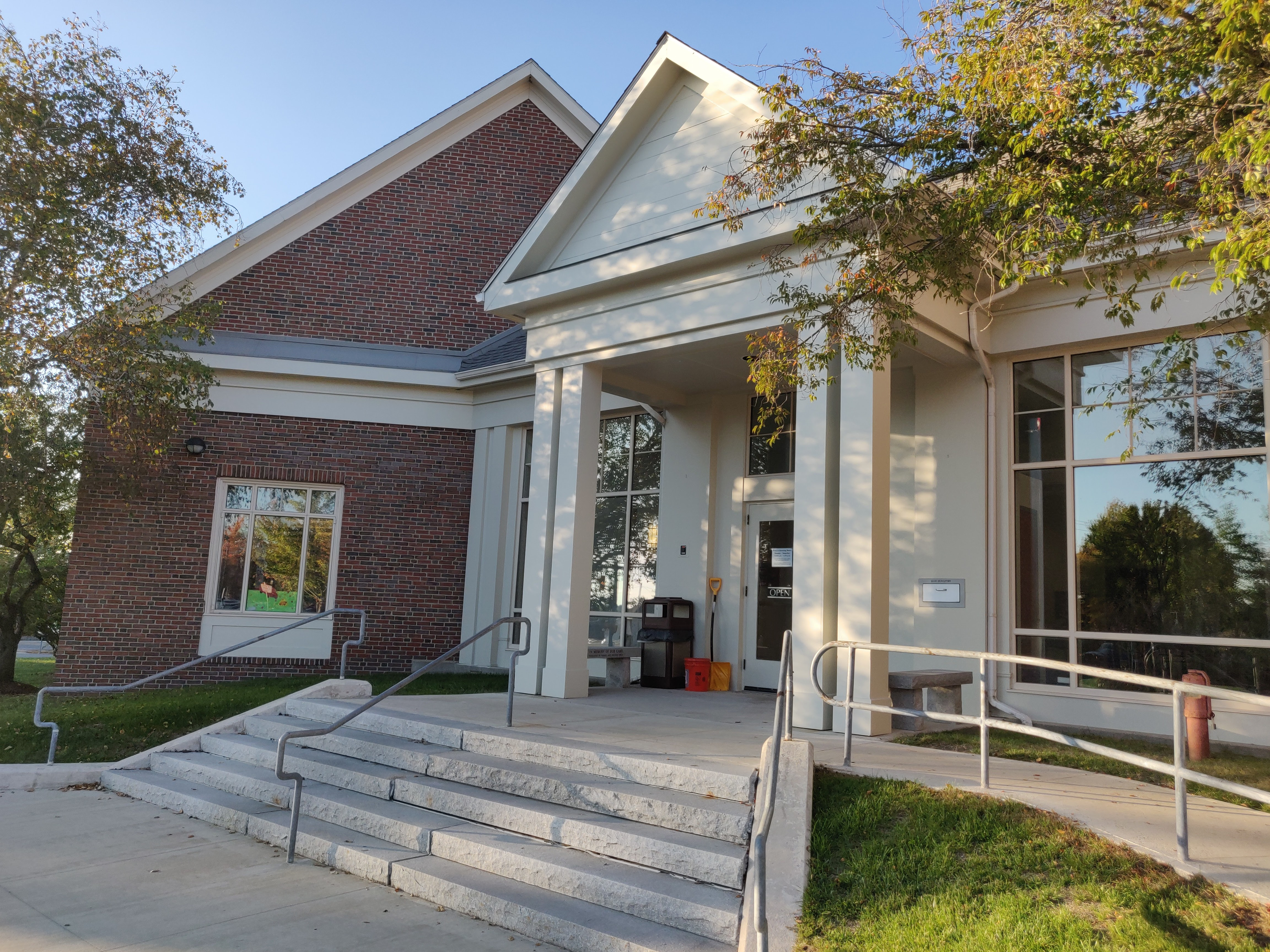
The Leach Library, the town's public library

The town is served by the Londonderry School District.

Kindergarten:

- Moose Hill School (includes LEEP, the Londonderry Early Education Program)

Elementary schools:

- North School
- Matthew Thornton Elementary School
- South School

Middle school:

- Londonderry Middle School

High school:

- Londonderry High School (home of the Lancers)

Londonderry sent high school students to Pinkerton Academy in Derry until 1978, when Londonderry High opened.

== Media ==
Media outlets that cover Londonderry include the Londonderry Times and the Derry News.

== Notable people ==
- Ant (born 1967), host of VH1 reality series Celebrity Fit Club
- Al Baldasaro (born 1956), former member of New Hampshire House of Representatives
- John Bell (1765–1836), 18th governor of New Hampshire
- Samuel Bell (1770–1850), 14th governor of New Hampshire
- Silas Betton (1768–1822), US congressman
- Dom DiMaggio (1917–2009), outfielder with the Boston Red Sox
- John Fisher (1806–1882), industrialist; US congressman from New York
- Ryan Griffin (born 1990), tight end for the Chicago Bears
- Kevin Hunt (1948–2015), NFL player (offensive lineman) for four teams
- Arthur Livermore (1766–1853), US congressman
- Joseph McKeen (1757–1807), president of Bowdoin College
- Dan Mullen (born 1972), head coach for the UNLV Rebels football team
- Ocean Born Mary (1720–1814), subject of a local ghost legend
- William M. Oliver (1792–1863), US congressman
- Ethan Paquin, poet
- George W. Patterson (1799–1879), US congressman
- Peter Patterson (1825–1904), businessman, Canadian politician
- William Patterson (1789–1838), US congressman
- George Reid (1733–1815), Revolutionary War era officer
- William Stark (1724–1776), Revolutionary War era officer, loyalist to Britain
- Samuel Taggart (1754–1825), US congressman
- Matthew Thornton (1714–1803), Founding Father, signer of the Declaration of Independence
- Brian Wilson (born 1982), pitcher with two teams
- James Wilson (1763–1855), first maker of globes in the US
