= New Hampshire Route 28 =

State highway in eastern New Hampshire, US

New Hampshire Route 28
- Map of southeastern New Hampshire with NH 28 highlighted in red

Route information
- Maintained by NHDOT
- Length: 85.413 mi (137.459 km)

Major junctions
- South end: Route 28 in Methuen, MA
- NH 28 Bypass in Derry; I-93 in Londonderry; I-293 / NH 101 in Manchester; US 3 in Manchester; I-93 in Hooksett; US 4 / US 202 / NH 9 in Epsom; NH 11 / NH 28A in Alton
- North end: NH 16 in Ossipee

Location
- Country: United States
- State: New Hampshire
- Counties: Rockingham, Hillsborough, Merrimack, Belknap, Carroll

Highway system
- New Hampshire Highway System; Interstate; US; State; Turnpikes
← NH 27	→ NH 31
← Route 26	N.E.	→ Route 30

New Hampshire Route 28 is an 85.413-mile-long (137.459 km) north–south state highway in eastern New Hampshire. It connects the town of Ossipee in east-central New Hampshire with Salem on the Massachusetts border, while passing through Manchester, the largest city in the state.

The southern terminus of NH 28 is on the Massachusetts state line in Salem in south central New Hampshire, from where Massachusetts Route 28 continues south into the city of Methuen and beyond to Boston and Cape Cod. The northern terminus is at the junction with New Hampshire Route 16, the White Mountain Road, in Ossipee, in northern New Hampshire.

Route 28 parallels Interstate 93 south of Manchester, going slightly northwest, but it goes northeast north of Manchester.

== Route description ==
New Hampshire Route 28 begins at the Massachusetts border in Salem, New Hampshire, as a continuation of Massachusetts Route 28. It is known locally as Broadway and forms the main north-south commercial street through Salem. It meets the northern terminus of NH 38 at Rockingham Park Boulevard and the western terminus of NH 97 at Main Street. Crossing into the town of Windham, the name changes to Rockingham Road and there is an intersection with NH 111 just past the town line. Leaving Windham at the northern border of town, it enters the town of Derry. At Main Street it meets the southern terminus of New Hampshire 28 Bypass, and Rockingham Road makes a hard left turn, heading slightly southwest. At the intersection with Birch Street, NH 28 turns right back to the northwest along Birch Street, which changes its name to Crystal Avenue at the intersection with NH 102/Broadway. At Tsienneto Road, the name changes again to Manchester Road, and NH 28 leaves Derry to the west into Londonderry.

In Londonderry, the name changes back to Rockingham Road. Initially heading west, the route bends to the north at Stonehenge Road, then west again for an interchange with I-93 (exit 5). NH 28 merges onto Mammoth Road, where the northern terminus of NH 128 is. It leaves Mammoth Road upon entering the city of Manchester, which continues on as the southern NH 28A, while NH 28 turns onto South Willow Street. Passing the Manchester Airport and the Mall of New Hampshire, there is an interchange with I-293 (exit 1). In downtown Manchester, at the intersection with Queen City Avenue/Cilley Road, NH 28 passes on to a pair of one-way streets, Beech Street southbound and Maple Street northbound. At Webster Street, NH 28 joins U.S. Route 3 for a concurrency along Daniel Webster Highway, leaving at Manchester's northeastern corner to the village of South Hooksett within the town of Hooksett, where it has another interchange with I-93 (exit 9) at the city line.

NH 28 and US 3 remain in concurrency through the entire town of Hooksett, following Daniel Webster Highway through the South Hooksett commercial district and closely following the eastern bank of the Merrimack River. Both NH 28A (Mammoth Road) and New Hampshire 28 Bypass (Londonderry Turnpike) have their northern termini within Hooksett. Between the two of them lies the western terminus of NH 27. Leaving Hooksett at the northern end of town, NH 28/US 3 crosses into the village of Suncook within the town of Allenstown. Leaving US 3 along Pinewood Road just before the Suncook River, NH 28 heads off in a northeasterly direction towards the main village of Allenstown before crossing the Suncook River and going through the extreme eastern corner of Pembroke and entering the town of Epsom.

At the Epsom line, the name changes to Suncook Valley Highway, as it closely follows the Suncook River's west bank. In the main village of Epsom, it meets US 202/US 4/NH 9 (Franklin Pierce Highway) at a large traffic circle. Next entering the North Chichester village of Chichester, the road curves from the northwest to the northeast and changes name to Suncook Valley Road. After its brief pass through Chichester, the road enters the town of Pittsfield, and skirting the western edge of the main village of Pittsfield, there is an intersection with NH 107. In Barnstead, NH 28 meets the northern terminus of NH 126 in the village of Center Barnstead. Passing by the Suncook Lakes that form the headwaters of the Suncook River, NH 28 enters the Lakes Region town of Alton after passing the northern shore of Halfmoon Lake, another source for the Suncook River.

In Alton, Suncook Valley Road meets its northern terminus in the main village of Alton at a traffic circle with NH 11/NH 28A, leaving the traffic circle along Wolfeboro Highway, going north, and then northeast, roughly following the eastern shore of Lake Winnipesaukee, meeting the northern end of NH 28A about halfway to the South Wolfeboro village of the town of Wolfeboro. At South Wolfeboro, NH 28 turns left at a T-intersection to travel along Tuftonboro Road, which changes its name to Main Street, passing through the main village of Wolfeboro. In the center of Wolfeboro Village, NH 28 leaves Main Street to join a concurrency with NH 109 along Center Street, meeting the southern terminus of NH 109A (Elm Street) in the village of Wolfeboro Falls. In the village of Wolfeboro Center, just north of Lake Wentworth, NH 109 leaves to the southeast along Governor John Wentworth Highway, while NH 28 continues straight along Center Street to the northeast. Entering the town of Ossipee at the village of Ossipee Corner, NH 28 crosses NH 171 before reaching its northern terminus at NH 16 (White Mountain Highway).

== Major intersections ==
County	Location	mi	km	Destinations	Notes
Rockingham	Salem	0.000	0.000	Route 28 south (Broadway) – Methuen	Continuation into Massachusetts
Rockingham	Salem	2.284	3.676	NH 38 (Rockingham Park Blvd.) – Pelham	Northern terminus of NH 38
Rockingham	Salem	3.281	5.280	NH 97 (Main Street) – Haverhill MA	Western terminus of NH 97
Rockingham	Windham	5.604	9.019	NH 111 to I-93 – Windham, Hampstead	
Rockingham	Derry	11.138	17.925	NH 28 Bypass (South Main Street) – Concord	Southern terminus of NH 28 Bypass
Rockingham	Derry	12.681	20.408	NH 102 (Broadway) to I-93	
Rockingham	Londonderry	16.493– 16.749	26.543– 26.955	I-93 – Manchester, Concord	Exit 5 on I-93
Rockingham	Londonderry	17.937	28.867	NH 128 (Mammoth Road) – Londonderry	Northern terminus of NH 128
Rockingham	Londonderry	19.542	31.450	NH 28A (South Mammoth Road) – Hooksett	Southern terminus of NH 28A
Hillsborough	Manchester	21.653– 21.788	34.847– 35.064	I-293 / NH 101 – Salem, Portsmouth, Concord, Bedford	Exit 1 on I-293 / NH 101
Hillsborough	Manchester	25.772	41.476	US 3 south (Hooksett Road)	Southern end of concurrency with US 3
Merrimack	Hooksett	26.598– 27.191	42.805– 43.760	I-93 – Salem, Boston, Concord, Plymouth	Exit 9 on I-93
Merrimack	Hooksett	28.186	45.361	NH 28A (Mammoth Road) – Londonderry	Northern terminus of NH 28A
Merrimack	Hooksett	28.682	46.159	NH 27 (Whitehall Road) – Candia, Raymond	Western terminus of NH 27
Merrimack	Hooksett	29.178	46.957	NH 28 Bypass – Derry	Northern terminus of NH 28 Bypass
Merrimack	Allenstown	34.837	56.065	US 3 north (Allenstown Road) – Concord	Northern end of concurrency with US 3
Merrimack	Epsom	43.541	70.072	US 4 / US 202 / NH 9 (Dover Road / Franklin Pierce Hwy.) – Concord, Northwood	Epsom traffic circle
Merrimack	Pittsfield	50.997	82.072	NH 107 (Barnstead Road) – Gilmanton, Pittsfield	
Belknap	Barnstead	54.558	87.803	NH 126 (South Barnstead Road) – Center Barnstead, Center Strafford, Rochester	Western terminus of NH 126
Belknap	Alton	63.544– 63.805	102.264– 102.684	NH 11 / NH 28A (Main Street) to NH 140 – New Durham, Rochester, Alton, Alton Bay, Laconia	Alton traffic circle; southern terminus of NH 28A (northern segment)
Belknap	Alton	67.793	109.102	NH 28A (East Side Drive) – Alton Bay	Northern terminus of NH 28A (northern segment)
Carroll	Wolfeboro	75.060	120.797	NH 109 north (South Main Street) – Melvin Village, Moultonborough	Southern end of wrong-way concurrency with NH 109
Carroll	Wolfeboro	75.524	121.544	NH 109A (Elm Street / Middle Road) – Ctr. Tuftonboro	Southern terminus of NH 109A
Carroll	Wolfeboro	78.244	125.922	NH 109 south (Gov. John Wentworth Hwy.) – Brookfield, Wakefield	Northern end of wrong-way concurrency with NH 109
Carroll	Ossipee	84.139	135.409	NH 171 (Water Village Road)	
Carroll	Ossipee	85.413	137.459	NH 16 (White Mountain Hwy.) – Center Ossipee, West Ossipee, Conway, Wakefield	Northern terminus
1.000 mi = 1.609 km; 1.000 km = 0.621 mi: Concurrency terminus

== Bannered and suffixed routes ==
=== New Hampshire Route 28 Bypass ===
New Hampshire Route 28 Bypass
- Location: Derry–Hooksett
- Length: 14.124 mi (22.730 km)

New Hampshire Route 28 Bypass is a 14.124-mile-long (22.730 km) bypass route of New Hampshire Route 28 east of the city of Manchester. The bypass separates from NH 28 in Derry, south of Manchester. While NH 28 runs through central Manchester, NH 28 Bypass runs along the eastern side of Manchester. The two routes rejoin in Hooksett, north of Manchester. The official local name of NH 28 Bypass is Londonderry Turnpike, but local residents generally refer to it simply as "The Bypass." It is the only New Hampshire state highway named and signed as a bypass.

=== New Hampshire Route 28A ===
New Hampshire Route 28A (abbreviated NH 28A) is a designation held by two north–south state highways in New Hampshire.

==== Southern segment ====
New Hampshire Route 28A
- Location: Londonderry–Hooksett
- Length: 7.623 mi (12.268 km)

The southern segment of NH 28A, 7.623 miles (12.268 km) in length and locally named Mammoth Road, connects Londonderry and Hooksett, running through the eastern suburbs of Manchester. The southern terminus is at the junction with New Hampshire Route 28 in Londonderry. The northern terminus is at the junction with U.S. Route 3/NH 28 in Hooksett.

==== Northern segment ====
New Hampshire Route 28A
- Location: Alton
- Length: 5.422 mi (8.726 km)

The northern segment of NH 28A is a 3.716-mile-long (5.980 km) loop road in the town of Alton. It splits off from NH 28, runs north along the shore of Alton Bay, an arm of Lake Winnipesaukee, then rejoins NH 28. For about one-third of its length, NH 28A runs concurrent to New Hampshire Route 11.

== See also ==
- New England Interstate Route 28, an early designation for NH 28
