= Derry (CDP), New Hampshire =

Census-designated place in New Hampshire, United States

Derry, New Hampshire
- Census-designated place
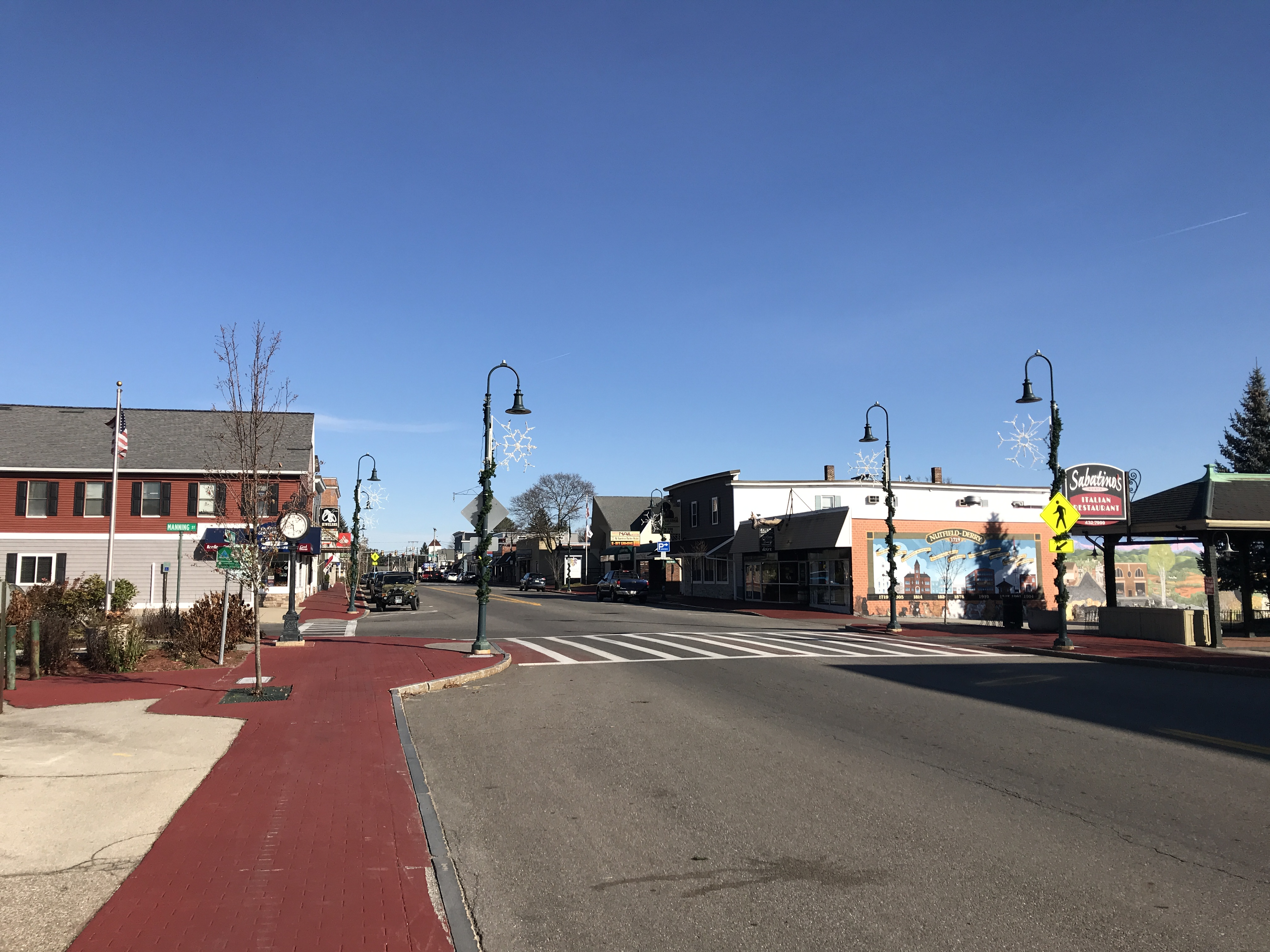
- West/East Broadway

- Location within New Hampshire Location within the United States
- Coordinates: 42°53′38″N 71°17′06″W
- Country: United States
- State: New Hampshire
- County: Rockingham
- Town: Derry

Area
  - Total: 16.27 sq mi (42.14 km^{2})
  - Land: 16.02 sq mi (41.50 km^{2})
  - Water: 0.25 sq mi (0.64 km^{2})
- Elevation: 456 ft (139 m)

Population (2020)
  - Total: 22,879
  - Density: 1,427.8/sq mi (551.27/km^{2})
- Time zone: UTC-5 (Eastern (EST))
  - Summer (DST): UTC-4 (EDT)
- ZIP codes: 03038 (Derry), 03041 (East Derry)
- Area code: 603
- FIPS code: 33-17860
- GNIS feature ID: 2378058

Derry is a census-designated place (CDP) in the town of Derry, New Hampshire, United States. The CDP comprises the urban center of the town, as well as the village of East Derry and connected suburban areas. The population of the CDP was 22,879 at the 2020 census, out of 34,317 in the entire town.

== Geography ==
The CDP occupies the central section of the town of Derry, extending from the western border of town to the eastern border. The main urban area of Derry, centered on the intersection of New Hampshire Routes 102 and 28, is in the western part of the CDP, and the village of East Derry is near the geographic center of the CDP. The town line with Londonderry forms the western border of the CDP, and the eastern border is the town line with Hampstead and Sandown. A portion of the northeastern edge of the CDP follows the town line with Chester.

Route 28 passes through the center of Derry, leading northwest 4 miles (6 km) to Interstate 93 Exit 5 in North Londonderry and 11 miles (18 km) to Manchester. Route 28 leads southeast 10 miles (16 km) to Salem. Route 102 crosses Route 28 in the center of Derry, leading southwest 1 mile (1.6 km) to Interstate 93 Exit 4 in Londonderry and 12 miles (19 km) to Nashua. To the northeast Route 102 leads 15 miles (24 km) to Raymond. New Hampshire Route 28 Bypass crosses the CDP east of Derry's central urban area, leading northwest 8 miles (13 km) to New Hampshire Route 101 east of Manchester. Interstate 93 forms part of the southwestern border of the CDP and leads northwest 11 miles (18 km) to Manchester and southeast 40 miles (64 km) to Boston, Massachusetts.

According to the U.S. Census Bureau, the Derry CDP has a total area of 16.3 square miles (42.1 km^{2}), of which 16.0 square miles (41.5 km^{2}) are land and 0.2 square miles (0.6 km^{2}), or 1.52%, are water. Beaver Lake is near the center of the CDP, northeast of Derry village and northwest of East Derry. Its outlet, Beaver Brook, flows southwest through Derry and eventually to the Merrimack River.

== Demographics ==
Historical population
Census	Pop.	Note	%±
1960	4,468		—
1970	6,090		36.3%
1980	12,248		101.1%
1990	20,446		66.9%
2000	22,661		10.8%
2010	22,015		−2.9%
2020	22,879		3.9%
U.S. Decennial Census

As of the census of 2010, there were 22,015 people, 8,806 households, and 5,704 families residing in the CDP. There were 9,339 housing units, of which 533, or 5.7%, were vacant. The racial makeup of the CDP was 94.2% white, 1.0% African American, 0.3% Native American, 1.6% Asian, 0.05% Pacific Islander, 1.1% some other race, and 1.8% from two or more races. 3.6% of the population were Hispanic or Latino of any race.

Of the 8,806 households in the CDP, 35.4% had children under the age of 18 living with them, 45.6% were headed by married couples living together, 13.5% had a female householder with no husband present, and 35.2% were non-families. 27.3% of all households were made up of individuals, and 7.6% were someone living alone who was 65 years of age or older. The average household size was 2.48, and the average family size was 3.03.

23.6% of residents in the CDP were under the age of 18, 9.8% were from age 18 to 24, 28.2% were from 25 to 44, 28.9% were from 45 to 64, and 9.6% were 65 years of age or older. The median age was 37.5 years. For every 100 females, there were 98.6 males. For every 100 females age 18 and over, there were 94.2 males.

For the period 2011–15, the estimated median annual income for a household was $63,526, and the median income for a family was $81,867. Male full-time workers had a median income of $50,189 versus $38,107 for females. The per capita income for the CDP was $28,048. 10.0% of the population and 7.3% of families were below the poverty line, along with 16.7% of people under the age of 18 and 7.1% of people 65 or older.
