= New Hampshire Route 38 =

State highway in southern New Hampshire, US

New Hampshire Route 38
- NH 38 highlighted in red

Route information
- Maintained by NHDOT
- Length: 8.7 mi (14.0 km)

Major junctions
- South end: Route 38 in Dracut, MA
- North end: Rockingham Park Boulevard in Salem

Location
- Country: United States
- State: New Hampshire
- Counties: Hillsborough, Rockingham

Highway system
- New Hampshire Highway System; Interstate; US; State; Turnpikes
| ← NH 33 | → NH 41 |

New Hampshire Route 38 (abbreviated NH 38) is an 8.7-mile-long (14.0 km) north–south state highway in extreme southern New Hampshire. It is the main road connecting Pelham with Salem.

The southern terminus is in Pelham at the Massachusetts state line, where the road continues south as Massachusetts Route 38, which runs 27 miles (43 km) from Dracut to Somerville. The northern terminus of NH 38 is in Salem at Rockingham Park Boulevard near the Mall at Rockingham Park, Interstate 93 (I-93) and NH 28.

== Route description ==
The state route begins at the Massachusetts state line within the town of Pelham, Hillsborough County. After passing through the reaches of a quarry, most of which is in Massachusetts, it travels north along Bridge Street passing numerous businesses, but otherwise traveling to the east of the center of town. At Main Street, it begins to bend to the northeast, passing under a power line corridor, and then heads through a residential neighborhood. It crosses into Salem, Rockingham County where the highway name changes to Lowell Road. Through Salem, NH 38 crosses another residential neighborhood before it heads past more commercial properties. The road passes under I-93 before it curves to the north to head along the west side of the Mall at Rockingham Park and its name changes to Pleasant Street.

There is some inconsistency regarding the northern terminus of the route. According to signage, NH 38 turns onto Mall Road where it loops around the mall's parking lot and to the east of the former Rockingham Park race track. Now traveling south, NH 38 passes numerous entrances to the mall and track before ending at Rockingham Park Boulevard, a connector road between I-93's exit 1 and NH 28. According to the New Hampshire Department of Transportation, the route of NH 38 continues along Pleasant Street before turning east onto Main Street where the route ends at NH 28 and NH 97. This routing is the former route of NH 38 prior to the construction of the mall.

== Junction list ==
| County | Location | mi | km | Destinations | Notes |
|---|---|---|---|---|---|
| Hillsborough | Pelham | 0.0 | 0.0 | Route 38 south (Bridge Street) | Continuation into Massachusetts |
| Rockingham | Salem | 8.7 | 14.0 | Rockingham Park Boulevard to I-93 / NH 28 – Salem, Boston, MA | |
1.000 mi = 1.609 km; 1.000 km = 0.621 mi
