= Beaver Brook (Merrimack River tributary) =

River in New Hampshire and Massachusetts, US

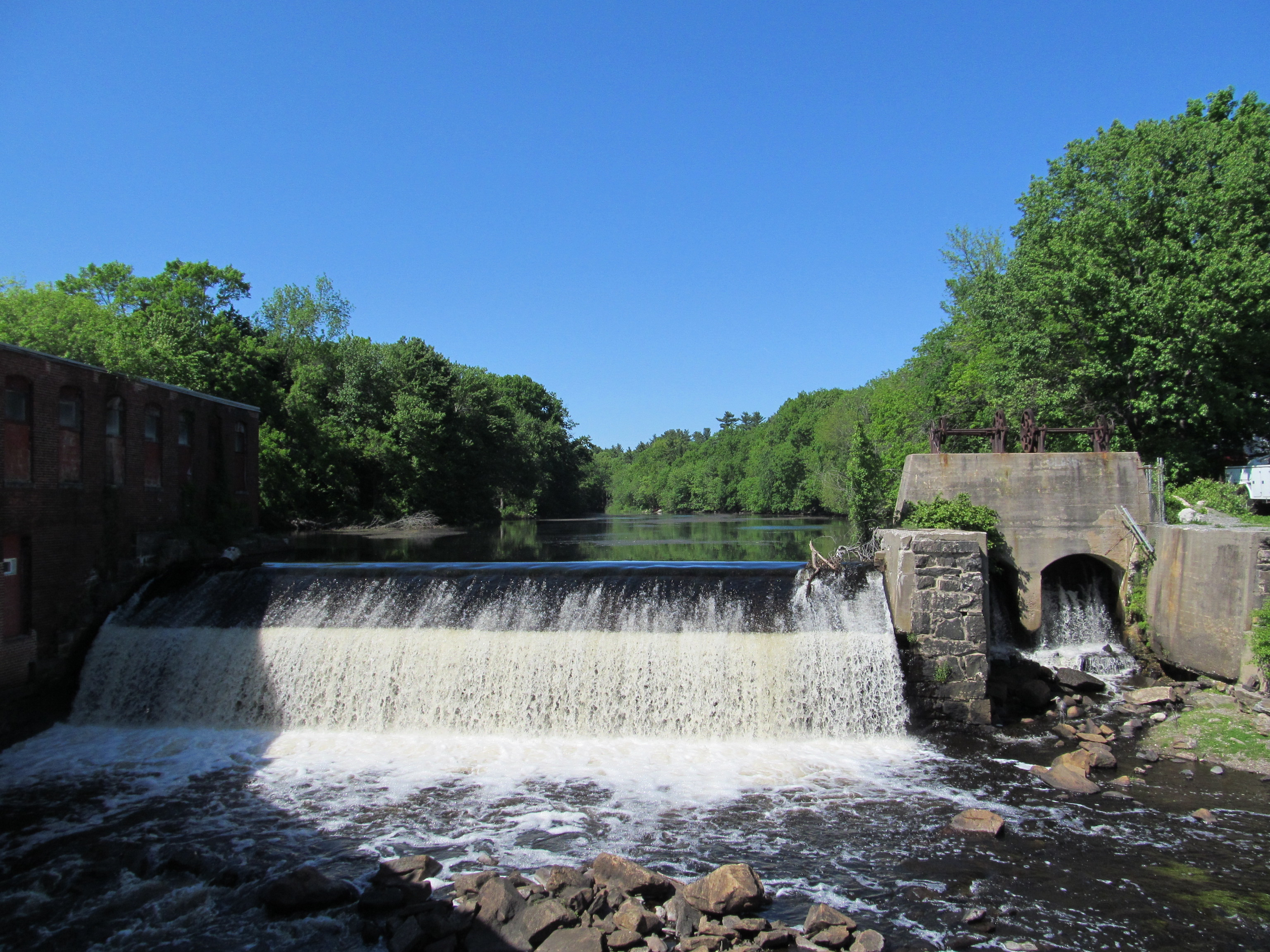
- Beaver Brook at the Collinsville Dam in Dracut, Massachusetts

- Location within New Hampshire Location within Massachusetts Location within the United States

Location
- Country: United States
- States: New Hampshire, Massachusetts
- Counties: Rockingham and Hillsborough, NH; Middlesex, MA
- Towns and cities: Chester, Derry, Londonderry, Windham, Hudson and Pelham, NH; Dracut and Lowell, MA

Physical characteristics
- Source
  - location: Chester, Rockingham County, NH
  - coordinates: 42°57′18″N 71°16′36″W
  - elevation: 435 ft (133 m)
- Mouth: Merrimack River
  - location: Lowell, Middlesex County, MA
  - coordinates: 42°39′30″N 71°19′6″W
  - elevation: 55 ft (17 m)
- Length: 30.7 mi (49.4 km)

Basin features
- Tributaries
  - left: West Running Brook, Golden Brook, Peppermint Brook
  - right: Shields Brook, Gumpas Pond Brook, Double Brook

Beaver Brook is a 30.7-mile-long (49.4 km) river located in New Hampshire and Massachusetts in the United States. It is a tributary of the Merrimack River, part of the Gulf of Maine watershed.

Beaver Brook rises in Chester, New Hampshire, and flows south into Derry, passing through Harantis Lake, Adams Pond, and Beaver Lake. Continuing south, the brook forms the boundary between Londonderry and Windham, then flows through Pelham. The brook crosses the state line into Dracut, Massachusetts, and reaches the Merrimack River in the city of Lowell.

Most of the brook's course is through gently hilly terrain that is rapidly being converted into suburban land use.

== See also ==
- List of rivers of Massachusetts
- List of rivers of New Hampshire
- New Hampshire historical marker no. 58: Scotch-Irish Settlement
