= New Hampshire Route 102 =

State highway in southern New Hampshire, US

New Hampshire Route 102
- Map of southern New Hampshire with NH 102 highlighted in red

Route information
- Maintained by NHDOT
- Length: 23.956 mi (38.553 km)

Major junctions
- West end: NH 3A / NH 111 in Hudson
- I-93 in Londonderry
- East end: NH 107 in Raymond

Location
- Country: United States
- State: New Hampshire
- Counties: Hillsborough, Rockingham

Highway system
- New Hampshire Highway System; Interstate; US; State; Turnpikes
| ← NH 101E | → NH 103 |

New Hampshire Route 102 (abbreviated NH 102) is a 23.956-mile-long (38.553 km) state highway in Rockingham and Hillsborough counties in the southern part of the U.S. state of New Hampshire. NH 102 runs southwest to northeast between Hudson and Raymond, but is signed as an east–west route.

Some confusion exists over the western terminus. The state route logs show that the end of the road is at the junction with Ferry Street (New Hampshire Route 111) in Hudson, and the end of NH 102 is marked at that intersection westbound. However, local signage further west along NH 111 shows NH 102 continuing along NH 111 as a concurrency over the Hudson Bridge into Nashua. Signage on the bridge indicates NH 102 sharing East Hollis Street with NH 111.

The eastern terminus of NH 102 is in Raymond at New Hampshire Route 107, a short distance south of New Hampshire Route 101. While older exit signs on NH 101 indicated 102 at the exit, the road officially ends at NH 107, and recently-replaced signage on NH 101 now reads "TO NH 102."

== Route description ==
The route starts in Hudson at Route 111 (Ferry Street) and Route 3A (Chase Street). This starts a concurrency with Route 3A. The southern part of this concurrency forms one of the main commercial districts in Hudson, known as Derry Street. At Elm Avenue, 3A leaves the concurrency heading west, while 102 continues in a more northeasterly direction along Derry Road. After passing Alvirne High School, NH 102 passes through the extreme southeastern corner of Litchfield before returning to Hudson. After leaving Hudson a second time, it enters Londonderry as Nashua Road, passing through a rural area near several farms and apple orchards. A small commercial district surrounds the intersection with New Hampshire Route 128/Mammoth Road, and another more developed commercial district lies just to the west of 102's interchange with I-93.

Immediately after the interchange with I-93, Route 102 enters Derry as Broadway, the main commercial thoroughfare in town. After the intersection with Crystal Avenue (New Hampshire Route 28) at the center of town, it passes the Hoodkroft golf course and meets Main Street (New Hampshire Route 28 Bypass) at a traffic circle at the community of Derry Village. After the traffic circle, the route continues northwest along Chester Road, passing the Beaver Lake recreational area, and winding through the rural eastern portion of the town of Derry before entering the town of Chester, forming the main north-south route through the town. At the town center of Chester, NH 102 intersects New Hampshire Route 121, following Derry Road south of the intersection, and Raymond Road north of the intersection. Following a more northeasterly route, it winds through a rural area in southeastern Raymond before reaching its eastern terminus at New Hampshire Route 107, about 1/2 mile (0.80 km) short of the interchange with the New Hampshire Route 101 freeway.

== Major intersections ==
| County | Location | mi | km | Destinations | Notes |
|---|---|---|---|---|---|
| Hillsborough | Hudson | 0.000 | 0.000 | NH 111 (Ferry Street) NH 3A south (Chase Street) | Western terminus; western end of concurrency with NH 3A |
| Hillsborough | Hudson | 1.008 | 1.622 | NH 3A north (Elm Avenue) – Litchfield, Manchester | Eastern end of concurrency with NH 3A |
| Rockingham | Londonderry | 7.665 | 12.336 | NH 128 (Mammoth Road) – Londonderry, Pelham | |
| Rockingham | Londonderry | 9.368– 9.776 | 15.076– 15.733 | I-93 (Alan B. Shepard Highway) – Salem, Manchester | Exit 4 on I-93 |
| Rockingham | Derry | 10.857 | 17.473 | NH 28 (Crystal Avenue/Birch Street) | |
| Rockingham | Derry | 11.798 | 18.987 | NH 28 Bypass (North Main Street/South Main Street/East Derry Road) | Danforth Circle |
| Rockingham | Chester | 17.248 | 27.758 | NH 121 (Chester Street/Haverhill Road) – Manchester, Plaistow | |
| Rockingham | Raymond | 23.956 | 38.553 | NH 107 (Fremont Road) to NH 101 – Raymond, Epping, Fremont | Eastern terminus |
1.000 mi = 1.609 km; 1.000 km = 0.621 mi: Concurrency terminus
