= List of things named after Daniel Webster =

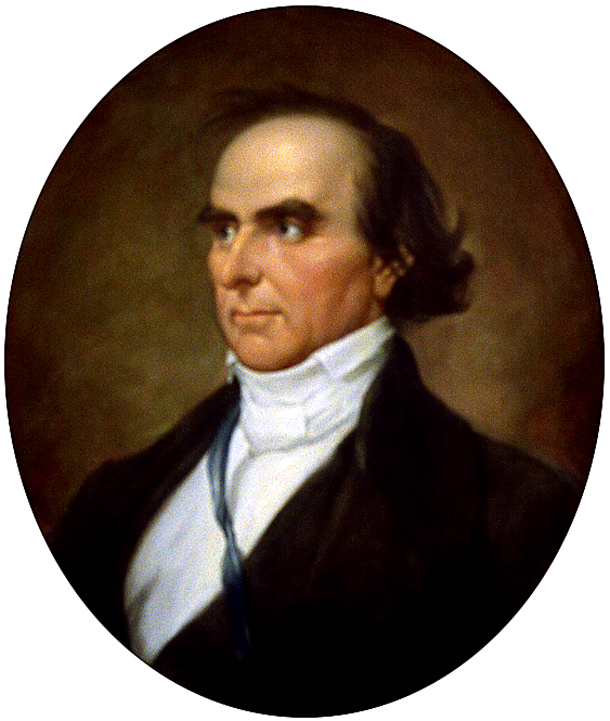
Portrait of Daniel Webster chosen by Senator John F. Kennedy to adorn the Senate Reception Room

The following is a list of things named after Daniel Webster.

== Literature and film ==
- The Devil and Daniel Webster, a popular short story, play and movie by Stephen Vincent Benét

== Schools and colleges ==
- Daniel Webster College, a defunct four-year college in Nashua, New Hampshire
- A dormitory at Phillips Exeter Academy is named Webster Hall in honor of Daniel Webster, as is the fifth floor of Phillips Hall, which is known as the Daniel Webster Debate Room. It serves as the meeting spot for the Exeter Debate Team, which was renamed the Daniel Webster Debate Society in honor of Webster.
- Webster Hall, formerly the primary auditorium at Dartmouth College and located prominently on the campus Green, now houses the school's special collections library.
- Webster Hall at Southern New Hampshire University houses the School of Business and Center for Financial Studies.
- Daniel Webster High School in Tulsa, Oklahoma
- Daniel Webster Middle School (formerly Daniel Webster Junior High School) in West Los Angeles, California
- Daniel Webster Middle School (formerly Daniel Webster Junior High School) in Waukegan, Illinois
- Daniel Webster Elementary School in Daly City, California
- Daniel Webster Elementary School in San Francisco, California
- Daniel Webster Elementary School in Washington, D.C.
- Daniel Webster School 46 in Indianapolis, Indiana
- Daniel Webster Elementary School in Logansport, Indiana (1904?-1991)
- Daniel Webster Elementary School in his hometown of Marshfield, Massachusetts
- Webster Elementary School in Marshfield, Missouri
- Daniel Webster Elementary School in Weehawken, New Jersey
- Daniel Webster Magnet School in New Rochelle, New York
- Daniel Webster Elementary School in Dallas, Texas

== Postage stamps ==
- Webster appears on a total of fourteen US postage stamps, the first one issued in 1870.

== Politics ==
- Webster method (or Sainte-Laguë method), an apportionment method for allocating seats in a legislature
- Webster–Ashburton Treaty
- Webster–Hayne debate

== In Washington, D.C. ==
- Statue of Daniel Webster (U.S. Capitol): One of the two statues representing New Hampshire in the National Statuary Hall Collection in the United States Capitol.
- In 1957 a senatorial committee chaired by then-Senator John F. Kennedy named Webster as one of their five greatest predecessors, selecting Webster's oval portrait to adorn the Senate Reception Room off the Senate floor. In World War II, the United States Liberty ship SS Daniel Webster was named in his honor.
- Webster Hall houses the dormitory and school for the Senate Page Program in Washington, DC. He had appointed the first Senate page in 1829.
- Daniel Webster Memorial, a statue in a park at Massachusetts Ave., NW and 16th Street NW across from Scott Circle.
- Webster School, local historic landmark built in 1882

== In Massachusetts ==
- Statue of Daniel Webster (Boston): A statue of Webster is in front of the Massachusetts State House in Boston.
- Town of Webster, Massachusetts, named in his honor by Samuel Slater on March 6, 1832.
- The Thomas–Webster Estate in Marshfield
- The Daniel Webster Law Office in Marshfield
- The current Daniel Webster Inn and Spa, in Sandwich, Massachusetts, on Cape Cod, replaced a 300-year-old tavern of the same name which burned in 1971. At the old building, Webster had a room reserved for his frequent visits to Cape Cod from 1815 to 1851, and the inn was later named in his honor.

== In New Hampshire ==
- The town of Webster in Merrimack County
- Mount Webster, a peak in New Hampshire's White Mountains
- Webster Lake in Franklin, renamed in his honor in 1851 (formerly Clough Pond)
- Daniel Webster's birthplace in Franklin is preserved as a state historic site.
- Webster's birthplace has a corresponding New Hampshire historical marker (no. 91). Another historical marker in Brentwood (no. 180) commemorates his Rockingham Memorial opposing the War of 1812.
- The Daniel Webster Family Home in West Franklin was declared a National Historic Landmark in 1974. Also known as The Elms, this was also the site of the New Hampshire Home for Orphans during 1871–1959. Threatened by development in 2004–05, the property was saved by last-minute efforts by the Webster Farm Preservation Association working with the Trust for Public Land.
- The Daniel Webster Highway, several portions of US Route 3 in New Hampshire
- A statue of Webster is in front of the New Hampshire State House in Concord.
- Daniel Webster Council, a division of the Boy Scouts of America covering most of New Hampshire
- The Daniel Webster Scout Trail, a hiking trail up Mount Madison in the White Mountains. The trail was constructed by Scouts of the Daniel Webster Council in 1933 and is maintained by the Appalachian Mountain Club.

== In New York ==
- Webster, a town in Monroe County, was named for him (outside of Rochester, pop. 40,000)
- Statue of Daniel Webster (New York City): A bronze statue of Webster stands at 72nd Street in Central Park, New York City.

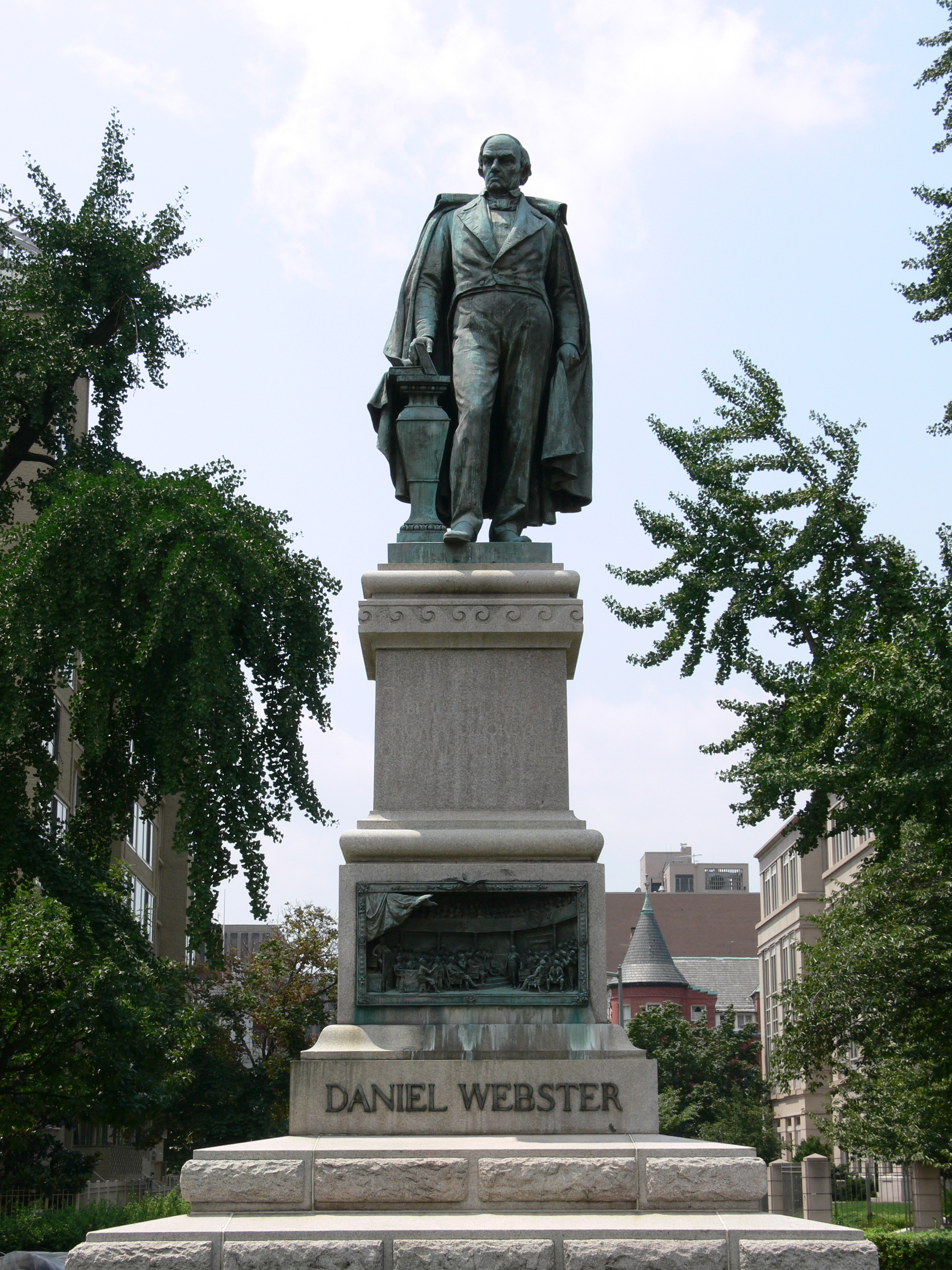
Daniel Webster Memorial located on Scott Circle in Washington, D.C.

- Webster Houses, a public housing project located in the Morrisania neighborhood of the Bronx in New York City

== Other place names ==
- Webster County, Georgia
- Webster County, Iowa
- Webster County, Kentucky
- Webster Parish, Louisiana
- Webster County, Missouri
  - Marshfield, Missouri, county seat of Webster County, is named after the city in Massachusetts where he lived at his death.
- Webster County, Nebraska
- Webster County, West Virginia
- North Webster, Indiana
- Webster Township, Michigan, in Washtenaw County
- Webster United Church of Christ of Dexter, Michigan, in Washtenaw County; he is purported to have contributed the sum of one hundred dollars to the church's construction in 1834.
- Webster Groves, Missouri
- Webster, a town in Vernon County, Wisconsin

== In song ==
In 1850, John H. Hewitt wrote the song, "The Union Forever", using the theme from #21 "Per te d'immenso giubilo" from Lucia di Lammermoor, and dedicated it to Daniel Webster.

== Ships ==
- Daniel Webster (steamboat)
- USS Daniel Webster, a U.S. Navy submarine
