= Webster Lake =

Webster Lake or Lake Webster may refer to a water body in the United States:

- Lake Chaubunagungamaug, or "Webster Lake", in Webster, Massachusetts
- Webster Lake (Indiana) in North Webster, Indiana
- Webster Lake (Berrien County, Michigan), a lake in Michigan
- Webster Lake (New Hampshire), in Franklin, New Hampshire
- Webster Lake, EP by A Loss for Words
