= List of National Historic Landmarks in New Hampshire =

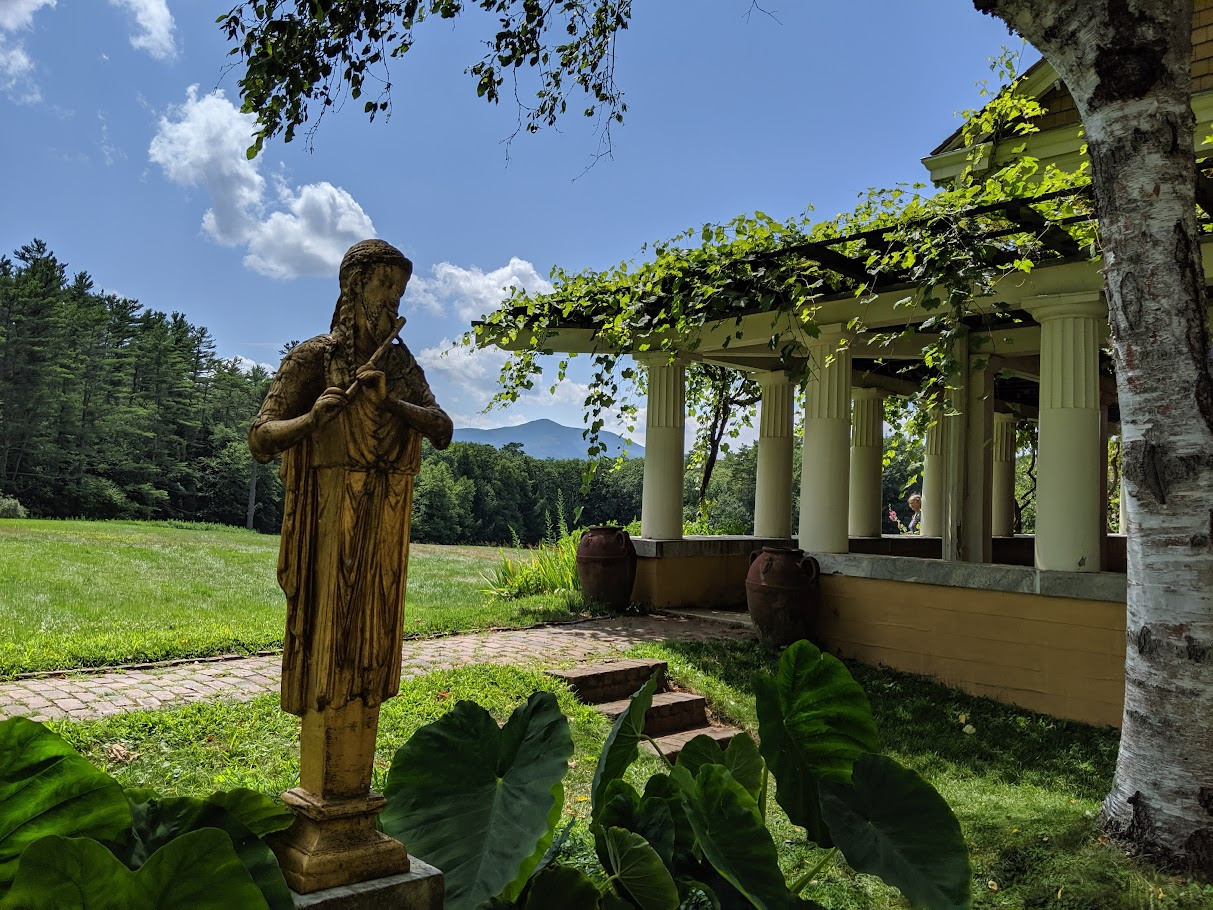
The studio of Augustus Saint-Gaudens in Cornish, NH. The Saint-Gaudens National Historical Park is New Hampshire's only unit of the National Park Service.

New Hampshire currently has 24 National Historic Landmarks; the most recent addition was Lucknow (Castle in the Clouds) in Moultonborough added in 2024. Three of the sites—Canterbury Shaker Village, Harrisville Historic District, and the MacDowell Colony—are categorized as National Historic Landmark Districts. One site, the Augustus Saint-Gaudens Memorial, is categorized as a National Historical Park.

The National Historic Landmark program is operated in the United States under the auspices of the National Park Service, and recognizes structures, districts, objects, and similar resources nationwide according to a list of criteria of national significance. National Historic Landmarks are a subset of the properties listed in the larger National Register of Historic Places.

== Key ==
	National Historic Landmark
^{†}	National Historic Landmark District
^{#}	National Historic Site, National Historical Park, National Memorial, or National Monument
^{*}	Delisted Landmark

== National Historic Landmarks in New Hampshire ==
	Landmark name	Image	Date designated	Location	County	Description
1	USS Albacore (Submarine)	USS Albacore (Submarine)	April 11, 1989 (#89001077)	Portsmouth; 43°04′58″N 70°45′59″W	Rockingham	Tear-drop shaped submarine.
2	Josiah Bartlett House	Josiah Bartlett House	November 11, 1971 (#71000050)	Kingston; 42°56′04″N 71°03′18″W	Rockingham	Home of New Hampshire politician and signer of the Declaration of Independence Josiah Bartlett.
3^{†}	Canterbury Shaker Village	Canterbury Shaker Village	April 19, 1993 (#75000129)	Canterbury; 43°21′32″N 71°29′24″W	Merrimack	One of the best-preserved Shaker villages.
4	Salmon P. Chase Birthplace and Boyhood Home	Salmon P. Chase Birthplace and Boyhood Home	May 15, 1975 (#75000133)	Cornish; 43°27′11″N 72°23′14″W	Sullivan	Birthplace and childhood home of Salmon P. Chase.
5	E.E. Cummings House	E.E. Cummings House	November 11, 1971 (#71000048)	Silver Lake; 43°54′49″N 71°11′01″W	Carroll	Home of poet E. E. Cummings.
6	The Epic of American Civilization Murals	The Epic of American Civilization Murals	February 27, 2013 (#13000283)	Hanover; 43°42′18″N 72°17′21″W	Grafton	A major series of murals by Mexican 20th century muralist José Clemente Orozco in Dartmouth's Baker Memorial Library.
7	Robert Frost Homestead	Robert Frost Homestead	May 23, 1968 (#68000008)	Derry; 42°52′18″N 71°17′42″W	Rockingham	Home of poet Robert Frost.
8^{†}	Harrisville Historic District	Harrisville Historic District	December 22, 1977 (#71000072)	Harrisville and vicinity 42°56′42″N 72°05′37″W	Cheshire	A picturesque and uniquely well-preserved mill town.
9	Richard Jackson House	Richard Jackson House	November 24, 1968 (#68000009)	Portsmouth; 43°04′52″N 70°46′01″W	Rockingham	Oldest surviving wooden house in the state.
10	John Paul Jones House	John Paul Jones House	November 28, 1972 (#72000084)	Portsmouth; 43°04′29″N 70°45′38″W	Rockingham	American Revolutionary War naval hero John Paul Jones boarded here in 1781-82, while supervising construction of a new battleship, the America.
11	Ladd-Gilman House	Ladd-Gilman House	December 2, 1974 (#74002055)	Exeter; 42°58′55″N 70°56′56″W	Rockingham	One of the state's first brick houses, now part of the American Independence Museum.
12	Governor John Langdon Mansion	Governor John Langdon Mansion	December 2, 1974 (#74000197)	Portsmouth; 43°04′30″N 70°45′22″W	Rockingham	Great Georgian house built in 1784, home of John Langdon.
13	Lucknow	Lucknow	December 13, 2024 (#100011375)	Moultonborough; 43°43′42″N 71°19′19″W	Carroll	Mountaintop mansion (better known now as the Castle in the Clouds) built in the Craftsman style by the shoe manufacturer Thomas Gustave Plant.
14^{†}	MacDowell Colony	MacDowell Colony	December 29, 1962 (#66000026)	Peterborough; 42°53′24″N 71°57′18″W	Hillsborough	A historic artists' colony established by the widow of composer Edward MacDowell.
15	MacPheadris–Warner House	MacPheadris–Warner House	October 9, 1960 (#66000028)	Portsmouth; 43°04′39″N 70°45′18″W	Rockingham	Built around 1720, this home is one of the finest Georgian brick houses in New England. Its lightning rod may have been the first installed in the area.
16	Moffatt-Ladd House	Moffatt-Ladd House	November 24, 1968 (#68000010)	Portsmouth; 43°04′43″N 70°45′29″W	Rockingham	1763 home of William Whipple, American Revolutionary War soldier and signer of the Declaration of Independence.
17	Mount Washington Hotel	Mount Washington Hotel	June 24, 1986 (#78000213)	Carroll; 44°15′29″N 71°26′25″W	Coos	Huge spa hotel in the White Mountains; site of 1944 Bretton Woods international monetary conference.
18	Franklin Pierce Homestead	Franklin Pierce Homestead	July 4, 1961 (#66000027)	Hillsborough; 43°06′59″N 71°57′02″W	Hillsborough	Childhood home of U.S. President Franklin Pierce.
19^{#}	Augustus Saint-Gaudens Memorial	Augustus Saint-Gaudens Memorial	June 13, 1962 (#66000120)	Cornish; 43°30′03″N 72°22′05″W	Sullivan	Home and studio of American sculptor Augustus Saint-Gaudens.
20	John Sullivan House	John Sullivan House	November 28, 1972 (#72000089)	Durham; 43°07′55″N 70°55′11″W	Strafford	Home of American Revolutionary War General and governor of New Hampshire John Sullivan.
21	Matthew Thornton House	Matthew Thornton House	November 11, 1971 (#71000053)	Derry Village; 42°53′38″N 71°18′47″W	Rockingham	Home of politician and signer of the Declaration of Independence Matthew Thornton.
22	Daniel Webster Family Home	Daniel Webster Family Home	May 30, 1974 (#74000196)	West Franklin; 43°24′24″N 71°39′11″W	Merrimack	Farmhouse where 19th century lawyer, politician, and orator Daniel Webster grew up. It is sometimes confused with the nearby Daniel Webster Birthplace State Historic Site.
23	Wentworth-Coolidge Mansion	Wentworth-Coolidge Mansion	November 24, 1968 (#68000011)	Portsmouth; 43°03′42″N 70°44′20″W	Rockingham	Forty-room rambling clapboard mansion on the water near Portsmouth, built by colonial governor Benning Wentworth.
24	Wentworth-Gardner House	Wentworth-Gardner House	November 24, 1968 (#68000012)	Portsmouth; 43°04′29″N 70°45′01″W	Rockingham	An exceptionally fine late Georgian (1760) wood-frame house.

== Related state and federal historic sites ==
Of the state's National Historic Landmarks, the National Park Service operates only one, the Augustus Saint-Gaudens Memorial. The state operates some of them as historic sites:

- Franklin Pierce Homestead Historic Site
- Robert Frost Farm Historic Site
- Wentworth-Coolidge Mansion Historic Site

The state also operates the Daniel Webster Birthplace State Historic Site, which is not far from the Daniel Webster Family Home listed above.

== See also ==
- National Register of Historic Places listings in New Hampshire
- List of National Natural Landmarks in New Hampshire
