= Franklin Falls Dam =

Dam in Franklin, New Hampshire, USA

Coordinates: 43°28′8″N 71°39′32″W

- Interactive map of Franklin Falls Dam
- Country: United States
- Location: Franklin, New Hampshire
- Status: Operational
- Construction began: 1939
- Opening date: 1943
- Designed by: Army Corps of Engineer

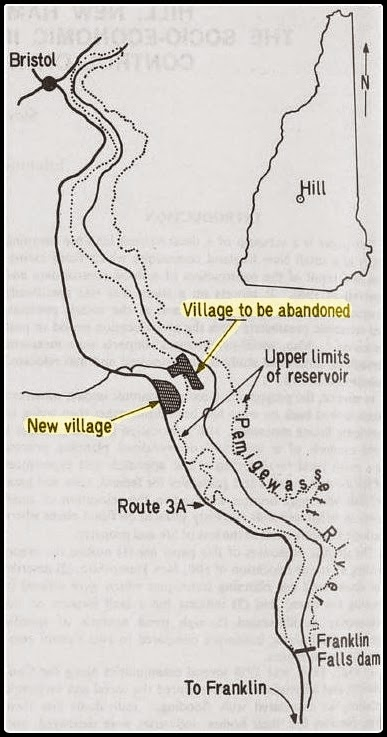

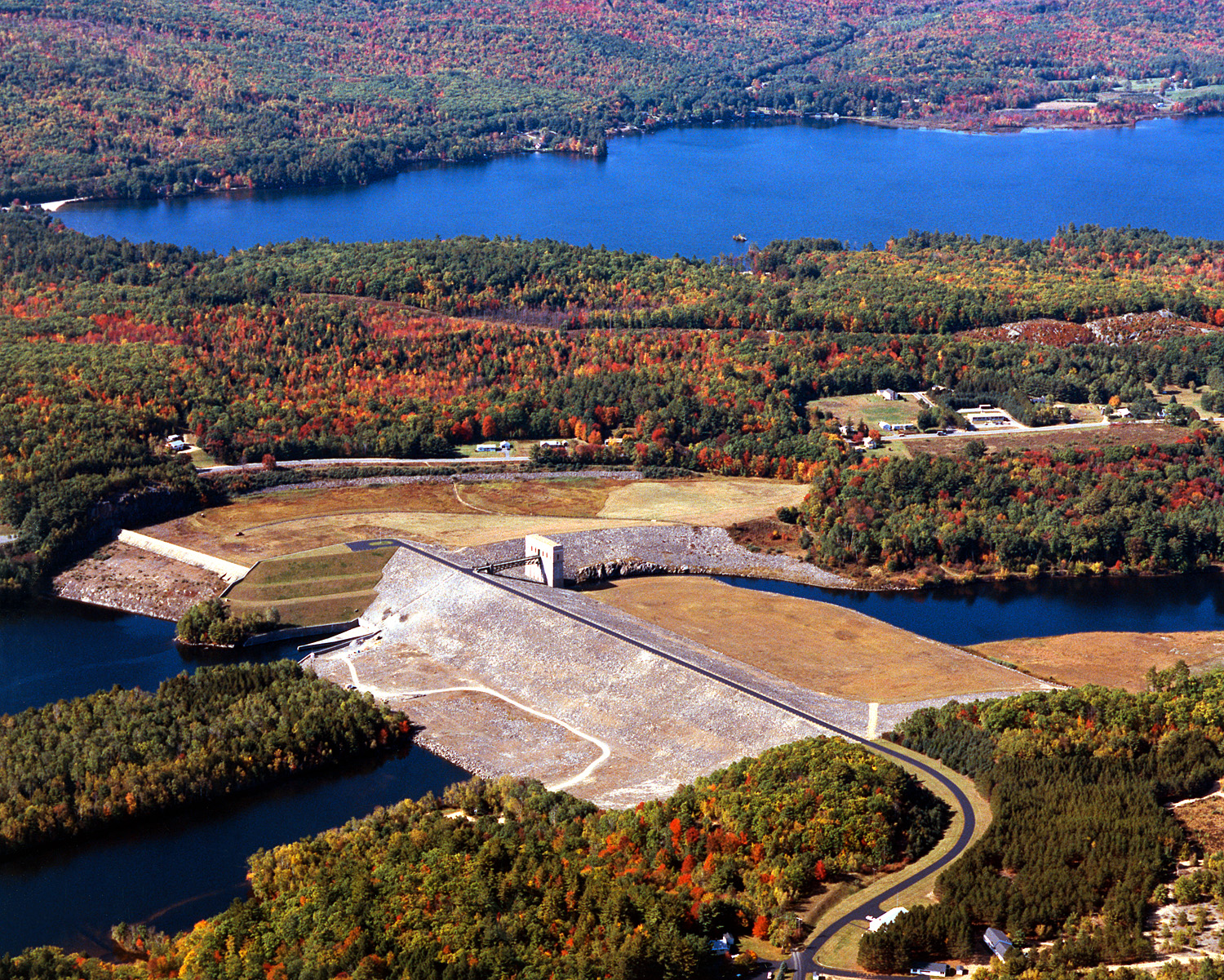
Franklin Falls Dam, with separate Webster Lake in the background

The Franklin Falls Dam is located on the Pemigewasset River in the city of Franklin, New Hampshire, in the United States. The dam was constructed between 1939 and 1943 by the Army Corps of Engineers and extends for 0.75 miles (1.21 km) across the river. During its construction, the neighboring residents of the town of Hill were forced to relocate to higher ground due to rising water levels created by the dam. The reservoir formed by the dam has a permanent pool covering 440 acres (180 ha), and the total flood storage capacity is 2,800 acres (1,100 ha). The total area of the project, including surrounding managed lands, is 3,683 acres (1,490 ha). The stretch of the Pemigewasset River potentially impounded by the dam extends 12.5 miles (20 km) north to Ayers Island Dam in the town of Bristol, and the watershed flowing to the dam extends north all the way into the White Mountains.

The Franklin Falls Reservoir hosts a variety of recreational activities, including hiking, mountain biking, fishing, kayaking, hunting, snowshoeing and Disc Golf.

== See also ==
- New Hampshire Historical Marker No. 162: New Hill Village
