= Webster Middle School =

Webster Middle School may refer to:

- Webster Middle School (Stockton, California)
  - Stockton High School (California), a former school in the building that was formerly Webster Middle School
- Webster Middle School, Webster, Massachusetts
- Webster Middle School, Del City, Oklahoma
- Webster Middle School, Oklahoma City Public Schools
- Webster Middle School, Webster, Massachusetts
- Webster Middle School, Webster School District (South Dakota)
- Webster Middle School, Cedarburg, Wisconsin

== See also ==
- List of things named for Daniel Webster
- Southeast Webster Middle School, Southeast Webster Community School District, Iowa
- Point Webster Middle School, Quincy Point, Massachusetts
