= Franklin Falls Historic District =

Historic district in New Hampshire, United States

- Franklin NH Historic District
- U.S. National Register of Historic Places
- U.S. Historic district
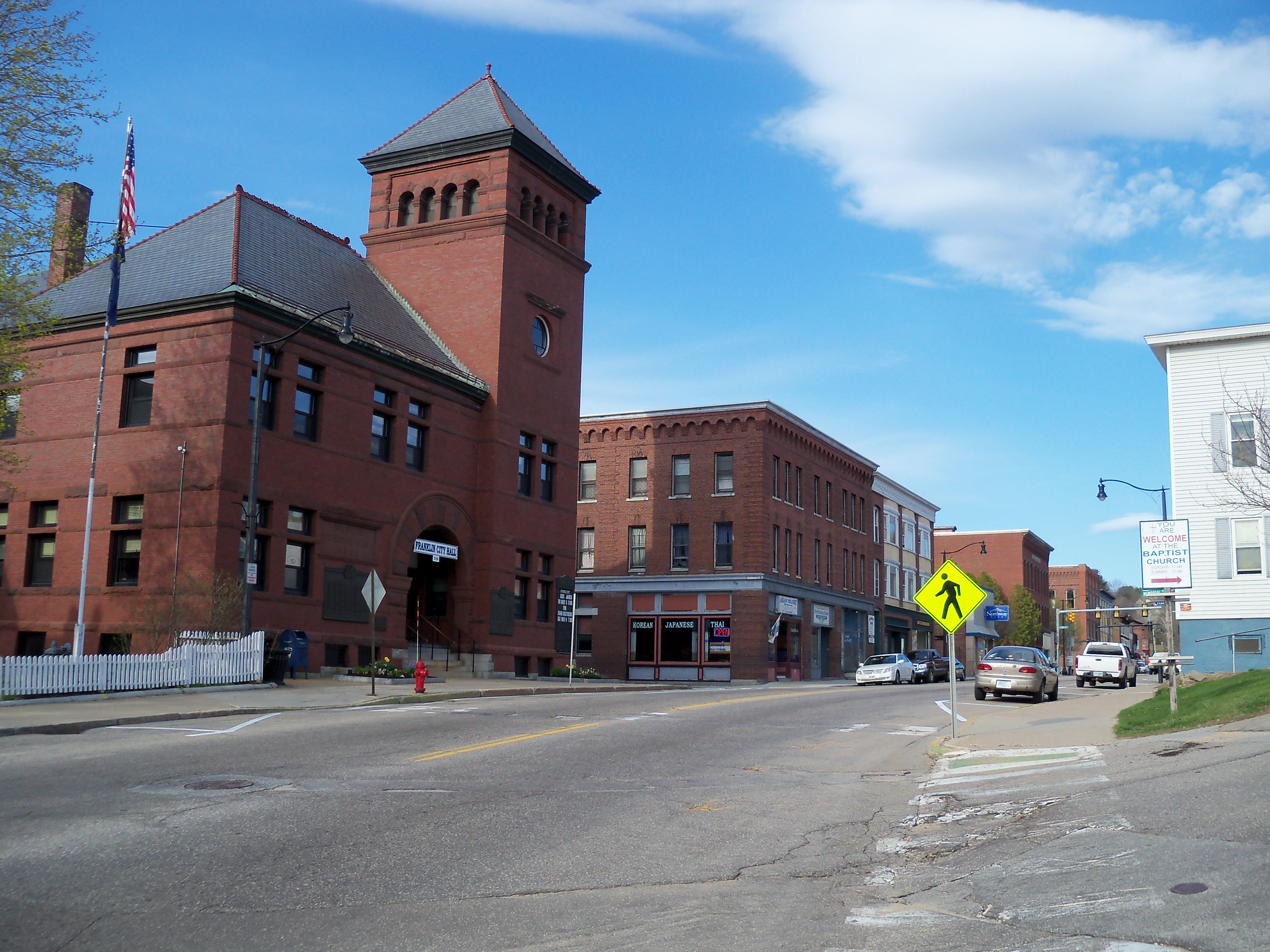
- Central Street; Town Hall is on the near left

- Location within New Hampshire Location within the United States
- Location: Roughly bounded by Bow, River, School, Aylers Sts. and Winnipesaukee River, Franklin, New Hampshire
- Area: 75 acres (30 ha)
- Built: 1840
- Architectural style: Mid 19th Century Revival, Late Victorian, Vernacular Commercial
- NRHP reference No.: 82001691
- Added to NRHP: August 19, 1982

The Franklin Falls Historic District is a 75-acre (30 ha) historic district encompassing most of the civic and industrial heart of Franklin, New Hampshire, which saw its most significant development in the second half of the 19th century and the first decades of the 20th. The district is focused on Central Street (U.S. Route 3) between two crossings of the Winnipesaukee River, and includes Odell Park along with industrial properties along the bend in the river north of those two crossings, as well as a number of properties on adjacent streets south of Central Street. The district was listed on the National Register of Historic Places in 1982.

The Franklin Falls area was occupied by the Penacook tribe of the Abenaki people at the time of European settlement of New England in the 17th century (documentation which has been confirmed by archaeological evidence found at Odell Park). Colonial settlement of the area did not begin until the late 1740s, and the area did not experience significant growth until the arrival of the railroad in 1846 and the subsequent expansion of industrial development. Walter Aiken, inventor of a knitting machine, in 1864 established a factory in the Franklin Falls area that is now part of the Franklin Industrial Company site. This was followed over the subsequent decades by the construction of a number of predominantly brick mill complexes that now line the river. Most of the original industries in these mill complexes had closed their doors by 1970.

The prosperity brought by this industrial development led to the development of Central Street as the major commercial and civic center of the town (which was incorporated as a city in 1894). Many of the brick Italianate buildings that line Central Street were built in the 1860s and 1870s. The area's civic improvements included the establishment of Odell Park in the 1890s, and the addition of several important civic structures: the Franklin Opera House, which houses town offices, was built in 1892, and a number of private libraries established in the 1890s were unified in the Franklin Free Public Library, whose 1907 building was funded in part by steel baron and philanthropist Andrew Carnegie.

== See also ==
- National Register of Historic Places listings in Merrimack County, New Hampshire
