= Webster School (Washington, D.C.) =

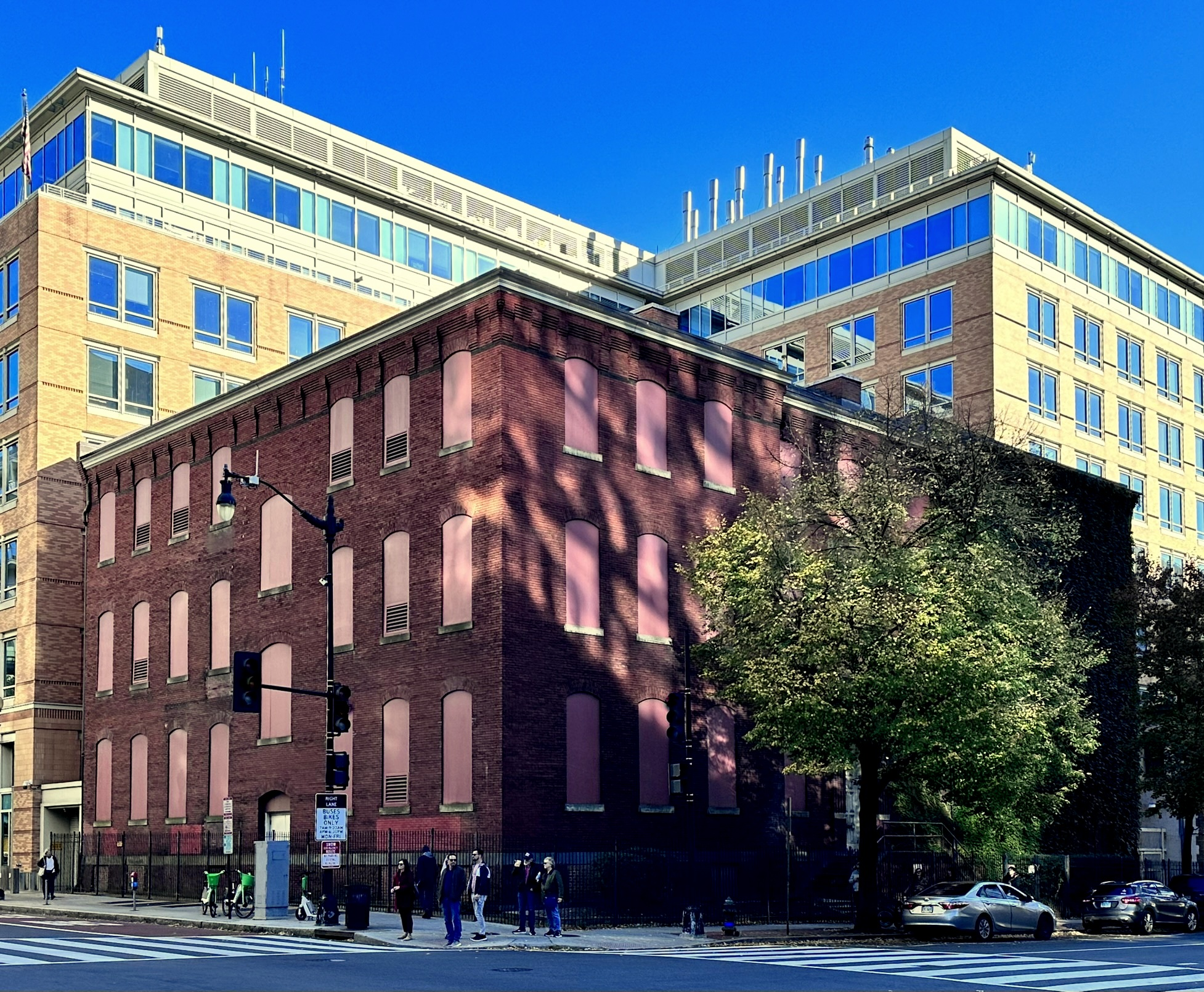
- Webster School in 2023 with the United States Secret Service headquarters in the background
- Interactive map of the Webster School area

General information
- Architectural style: Romanesque Revival
- Location: 940 H Street NW; Washington, D.C., U.S.
- Coordinates: 38.899643°N 77.025685°W
- Completed: 1882

Design and construction
- Architect: Unknown (possibly Edward Clark)
- Designations

D.C. Inventory of Historic Sites
- Designated: February 25, 1999

The Webster School, also called the Daniel Webster School, is a historic building located at 940 H Street NW in Washington, D.C. Built in 1882 as a segregated school for white children, it was among a large number of brick schools constructed in the city after the Civil War. These schools were located a couple of blocks from each other, allowing class sizes to be small. Most of the schools were two-story buildings, but some were larger and three stories. The Webster School was one of those larger schools. Although the architect is unknown, it is possible Edward Clark, who served as Architect of the Capitol from 1865 to 1902, designed the school. The red brick, Romanesque Revival style, U-shaped building features a few architectural details on the exterior, mostly around the main entrance facing 10th Street NW. It was named in honor of lawyer and politician Daniel Webster.

The school closed in the early 20th-century as the surrounding area became more commercial in nature. From 1924 to 1949, the building housed the Americanization School, a place where immigrants could learn English or take courses required for citizenship. The District of Columbia Public Schools (DCPS) used the building as office space until 1963, when it was converted into a school for pregnant teens. The school later housed special education classes before the building once again became office space for the DCPS. There was a plan to turn the property into a hospitality school in the mid-1990s, but the idea never came to fruition. Starting in 1999, there was a protracted legal battle between the property owner and local historic preservationists. The Culinary Arts Group planned to raze the building in 1998, to which preservationists responded with a historic landmark application. The building was added to the District of Columbia Inventory of Historic Sites in February 1999.

The United States Secret Service (USSS), which is headquartered beside the school, acquired the property via eminent domain in 2003, with plans to restore the building and convert it into office space. Restoration never happened and the building sat vacant for over 20 years. The USSS had stringent requirements for anyone planning to acquire the property, making it difficult to find a buyer. In 2023, Representatives Eleanor Holmes Norton and Scott Perry co-authored a congressional bill to sell the property. It passed the House of Representatives in December 2023. The building was sold at auction in December 2024 for over $4 million and the sale finalized in February 2025.

== History ==
=== New schools after the Civil War ===
Prior to the Civil War, most students in Washington, D.C., attended school in small wooden buildings. After the war, a city-wide project of building permanent schools began. The local government's engineer commissioner and staff from the Office of the Building Inspector designed schoolhouses throughout the city. They were built a couple of blocks apart to accommodate a small number of students. These buildings were composed of mostly eight to twelve rooms, made of red brick, designed in the Romanesque Revival style, and were two to three stories. Some of these were built as high schools and normal schools, but most were intended for younger students.

John B. Brady designed many of the schools, and Adolf Cluss designed some of the more elaborate ones, such as the Franklin School and Charles Sumner School. Many of the designs were approved by Edward Clark, who served as Architect of the Capitol from 1865 to 1902. The schools were designed to blend in with the surrounding area at the time. They often had a simple interior layout, but architectural elements including towers, terra cotta trim, and finials were added to the exterior.

Twelve-room schoolhouses grew less popular as they were more expensive to build and maintain. The eight-room version became the standard design for the city's schools in the 1880s. The somewhat simple box design of these buildings was not without critics. An article in the Evening Star called them "unattractive if not ugly...mere boxes of brick without any pretensions to beauty". The local government eventually allowed private architects to design some of the schools.

=== Webster School ===
==== School and office space ====
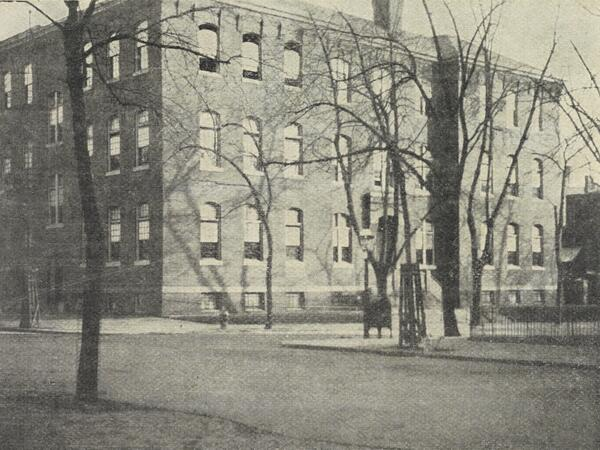
Webster School in 1884

When the Webster School was built in 1882, it only served the neighborhood's white students, due to segregation laws. Although the architect is unknown, the design for the three-story building was signed by Clark in 1881, meaning he either designed the school himself or approved it. Bright and Humphrey, a firm responsible for the Pension Building, constructed the school. The school was named in honor of Daniel Webster, a prominent lawyer and statesman who served in the Senate and as Secretary of State.

The school served students until a decrease in the neighborhood's population led to its closure in the 1920s. A few years later in 1924, the building became home to the Americanization School, a place where recent immigrants could learn how to culturally assimilate. The Americanization program was so popular that during the 1946-47 school year almost 500 students attended classes required for naturalization and around 2,200 people attended classes to learn English. The Americanization School remained in the building until 1949.

The following year, the building became office space for the District of Columbia Public Schools (DCPS). In 1963, the building was converted into the Girls' Junior-Senior High School, which provided education for pregnant teenagers. This was a local program which lasted for several years, serving about 220 students; demand continued to exceed space in the Webster School, so satellite facilities opened in 1970. In 1974, superintendent Barbara Sizemore initially voted to shutter the program before the school board reversed her decision, but the building was now being shared with special education students, relocated from the condemned Brookland School. Webster, by now exclusively used for special education, was recommended for closure in a 1978 plan to close 23 schools; Webster was one of the nine shuttered. It later reverted to DCPS offices.

==== Later history ====
In 1995 there were plans for the Hotel Association of Washington and the Restaurant Association of Metropolitan Washington to buy the property, but after the school superintendent who had promised the group they could purchase the building was fired, the deal ended. The intention was to open a "hospitality high school" to train local students who wanted to work in hotels and restaurants. The plan was praised by some industry and government officials but criticized by others who didn't think students should be trained for the service industry. The reason the Webster School had been chosen was because it was centrally located to many hotels and near a planned convention center. At the time, DCPS planned to sell the property due to low department funds.

In 1997, the property was appraised at $2,500,000. The appraiser suggested the "highest and best use" of the property was demolition so a new building could replace it. In 1998, the Culinary Arts Group (CAG) offered $2,000,000 for the property, and the deal was finalized the following year, beating an offer by the United States Secret Service (USSS), whose headquarters wraps around the east and south sides of the school. CAG planned to demolish the building on December 11, 1998, alarming historic preservationists when they heard about the raze permit. Within 48 hours of learning about the planned demolition, the D.C. Preservation League prepared a historic landmark application in hopes of stopping it. This led to a long bureaucratic and legal battle between the two groups. CAG eventually sold the property to the National Treasury Employees Union (NTEU), who continued to fight against preserving the building.

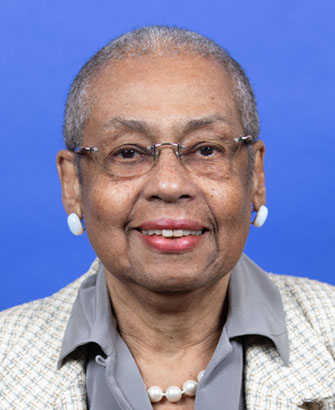
Representatives Eleanor Holmes Norton (pictured) and Scott Perry authored legislation to sell the Webster School.

The Webster School was added to the District of Columbia Inventory of Historic Sites on February 25, 1999. The reasons for the landmark designation was because the building is "a good representative example of the larger red brick public schools designed by the Office of the Building Inspector during the late nineteenth century", "the home of the Americanization School during that institution's most significant period", and "one of the last public schools remaining in downtown Washington, providing physical evidence of the residential neighborhoods and ethnic groups that were once an important part of the downtown community".

At the time of the building's landmark designation, there were 97 surviving school buildings in Washington, D.C., built before 1930, just a fraction of the original number. Many of the schools that once dotted downtown have been demolished to make way for office buildings and other projects. The NTEU planned to sell the property when it was unsuccessful in razing the building. It began negotiations with the USSS, but the two parties did not agree on the details. The USSS contacted the General Services Administration (GSA) in 2001, and the property was eventually acquired via eminent domain in 2003, with plans to restore the building and convert it into office space.

The building sat empty and boarded up for over a decade until the GSA was asked to sell "unneeded assets", but due to eight strict requirements by the USSS, it remained unsold. Requirements included periodic inspections by the USSS, no roof access, no security cameras facing the USSS headquarters, and a ban on ownership or occupation by any "foreign government or foreign-owned or-controlled entity". Meanwhile, the surrounding area changed rapidly after CityCenterDC, a $950 million multi-use development, was built across the street. Developers thought the building could be turned into a charter school, boutique hotel, or office space, but it remained unsold.

In early 2023, Mayor Muriel Bowser and other local officials announced the Downtown Action Plan, which aims to increase the population of downtown Washington, D.C. During and after the COVID-19 pandemic, many federal and private employees worked from home or only came in on certain days, driving up the vacancy rate in office buildings. The Webster School was mentioned as an empty building that could be rehabilitated and possibly used for affordable housing. The Washington Post reporters Meagan Flynn and Michael Brice-Saddler wrote, "Webster has stood as a visible reminder of the impact of vacant or underutilized federal buildings in the District, a problem that local leaders and congressional lawmakers have scrutinized with escalating intensity after the pandemic upended in-person office work."

In July 2023, Representatives Eleanor Holmes Norton and Scott Perry co-authored a congressional bill, H.R. 4688, to sell Webster School. After passing the House Transportation & Infrastructure Committee, Norton said, "GSA purchased the Webster School 20 years ago upon the request of the Secret Service, and yet neither the Secret Service nor the General Services Administration has ever used the building. This bill will return the site to productive use." According to a report by the Congressional Budget Office, selling the property would earn the government almost $500,000. On December 4, 2023, the bill passed the House of Representatives. In September 2024, the building was put up for auction. The winning bid was $4.138 million when the auction closed in December 2024. The sale was finalized in February 2025. The Department of Government Efficiency (DOGE) claimed credit for the sale, despite the auction taking place during the Biden administration.

== Location and design ==
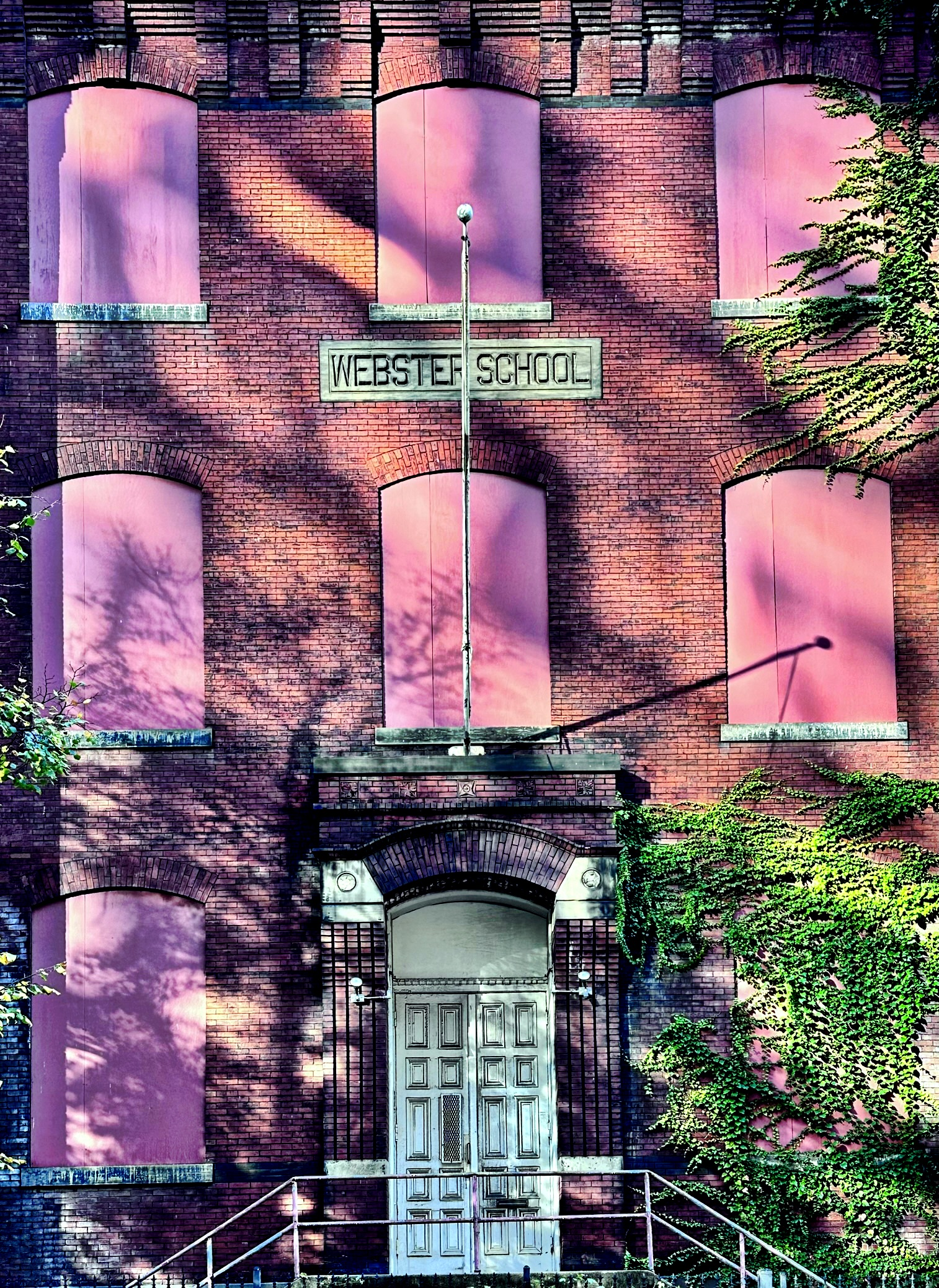
Entrance on 10th Street NW

The Webster School is located on the southeast corner of 10th and H Streets NW at 940 H Street NW, between Chinatown to the east and downtown to the west. The building is on Lot 375, Square 822, and the total land area is 8,455 square feet (785 sq m). Across the street to the west is the Grand Hyatt Washington, to the north CityCenterDC, and to the east and south the Secret Service headquarters.

The building is three floors in addition to a basement level, made of red brick, and designed in the Romanesque Revival style. It is one of the rarer three-story schools that were built. Although basically a brick box viewed from the street, the building is U-shaped, with the open area facing the Secret Service headquarters. The north side of the building facing H Street NW is 84 feet (25.6 m) long. The west side facing 10th Street NW is 107 feet (32.6 m) long. The original entrances are still on both 10th and H Streets NW, but the side entrance in the alley has been covered with bricks.

There is a sidewalk on the north and west sides of the building, with a larger setback on 10th Street NW to allow for plants. The hip roof is made of slate. Despite its simple appearance, there are architectural elements on the exterior that enliven the design. Corbelled cornices and a metal parapet are along the top of the building. The building's façade faces 10th Street NW. This side of the building is broken up into three pavilions and the central pavilion is where the main entrance is located.

A dual staircase leads from the sidewalk to the main entrance. There are architectural elements surrounding the door, including patterned bricks, a brick arch, and rosettes on stone imposts. Above the entrance and below the third floor window is the school's name in stone inscription. The paired sash windows of the central pavilion differ from the remaining windows. These are 12-over-12 with a bricked arch above the third floor window. The remaining windows are 9-over-9 single sash. The casement windows on the basement level are rectangular.

The interior layout, measuring 27,000 square feet (2,500 m^{2}), features four classrooms with adjoining cloakrooms on each floor and a central hallway. Located in the hallway on each floor is a lounge area. In total there were originally twelve rooms. The original layout of some of the classrooms was altered when it was used for office space. There is iron cresting at the top of the stairwell landing on the third floor.

== Notes ==
1. Also known as 723-29 10th Street NW
2. The historic landmark designation form can be found at the bottom of the linked page in pdf format.

== See also ==
- List of things named for Daniel Webster
