= Kenneth A. Randall =

American politician

Member of the New Hampshire House of Representatives from the Belknap 3rd district
- In office 1974–1988

Member of the New Hampshire House of Representatives from the Belknap 2nd district
- In office 1988–1990

Personal details
- Born: Kenneth Allan Randall; December 14, 1932 Franklin, New Hampshire, U.S.
- Died: July 2, 2021 (aged 88) Boscawen, New Hampshire, U.S.
- Party: Republican
- Education: Plymouth State University

Kenneth Allan Randall (December 14, 1932 – July 2, 2021) was an American politician. A member of the Republican Party, he served in the New Hampshire House of Representatives from 1974 to 1990.

== Life and career ==
Randall was born in Franklin, New Hampshire, the son of Earle Randall and Helen Thompson. He attended Northfield High School, graduating in 1950. After graduating, he attended Plymouth State University, earning his degree in 1954, which after earning his degree, he served in the United States Air Force. After his discharge, he worked as an instructor at the New Hampshire Technical Institute.

Randall served in the New Hampshire House of Representatives from 1974 to 1990.

== Death ==
Randall died on July 2, 2021, at the Merrimack County Nursing Home in Boscawen, New Hampshire, at the age of 88.
