= Thomas–Webster Estate =

Historic house in Massachusetts, United States

- U.S. National Register of Historic Places
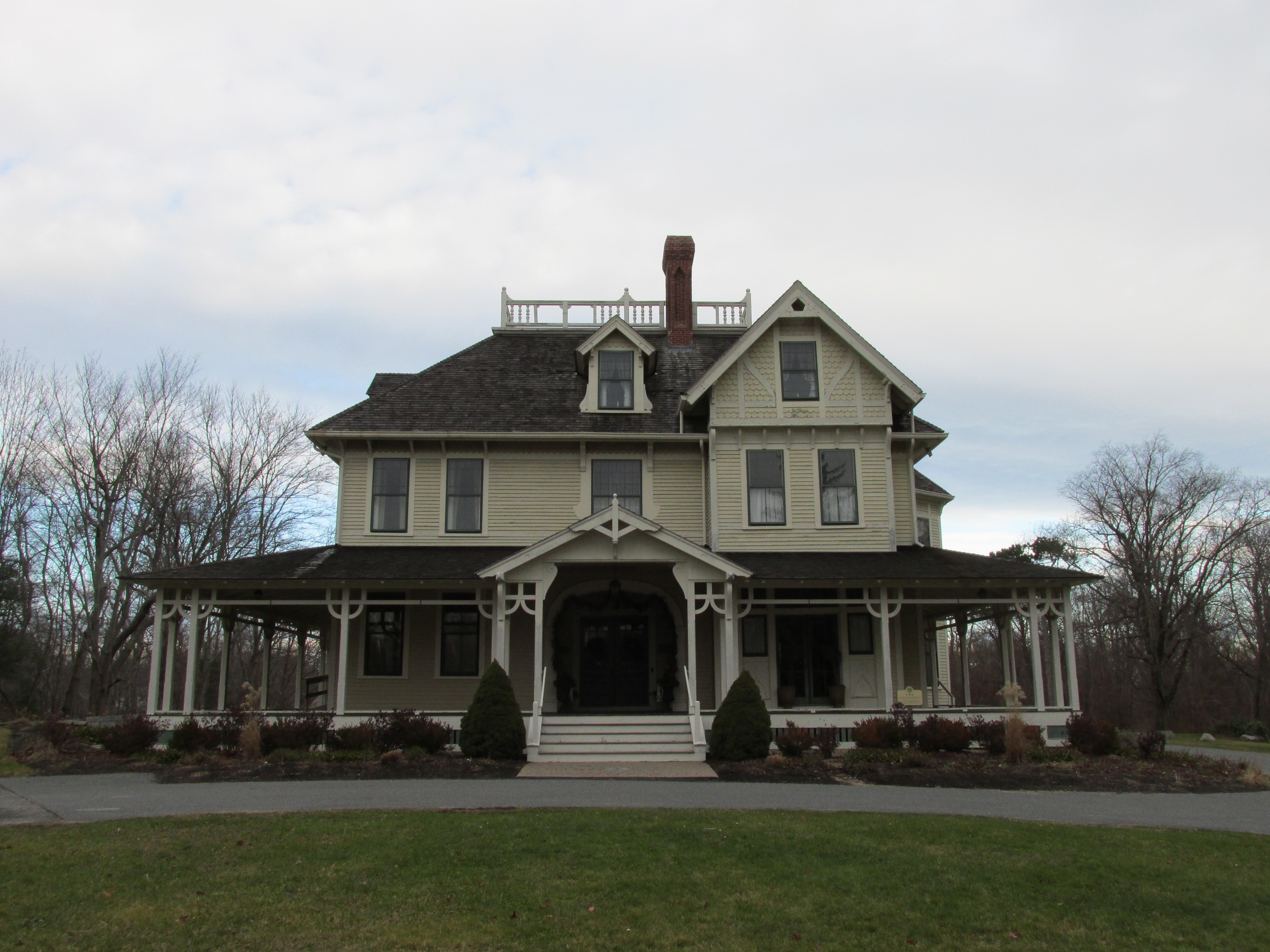
- Thomas–Webster Estate

- Location within Massachusetts Location within the United States
- Location: Marshfield, Massachusetts
- Coordinates: 42°4′46″N 70°40′46″W
- Built: 1832
- Architect: Preston, William Gibbons
- Architectural style: Bungalow/Craftsman, Queen Anne
- NRHP reference No.: 93000206
- Added to NRHP: April 5, 1993

The Thomas–Webster Estate is a historic estate at 238 Webster Street in Marshfield, Massachusetts. It is most notable for its association with the politician and statesman Daniel Webster, who owned a large (more than 1,000-acre (400 ha)) property in Marshfield, and is buried here along with other members of his family. The core of the estate was a farmstead Webster purchased from Nathaniel Thomas in 1832. Webster was known for his interest in agricultural science, and he made his farm one of the most productive in the area. Webster's house burned down in 1878, but a new house was built on its foundations. The property includes a number of landscape features designed by Webster, as well as the site where his small law office building stood during his lifetime. (The building, now a National Historic Landmark, was moved in 1966 to the property of the Isaac Winslow House, also a museum property.)

A summer camp was run on the site, with the main house serving as its administrative office, from the 1950s until its closing in the summer of 1998. The estate was listed on the National Register of Historic Places in 1993. It is currently owned by the town of Marshfield and is open for tours during the summer.

== See also ==
- Daniel Webster Birthplace
- Daniel Webster Family Home
- Daniel Webster Law Office
- National Register of Historic Places listings in Plymouth County, Massachusetts
