= Webster Lake (Berrien County, Michigan) =

- Location within Michigan
- Location: Berrien County
- Coordinates: 41°54′25″N 86°18′06″W
- Type: lake
- Surface area: 70.061 acres (28.353 ha)

Webster Lake is a lake in Berrien County, in the U.S. state of Michigan. It has a size of 70.061 acres (28.353 ha).

Webster Lake has the name of Luke Webster, a pioneer settler.
