= Daniel Webster Family Home =

Historic house in New Hampshire, United States

- U.S. National Register of Historic Places
- U.S. National Historic Landmark
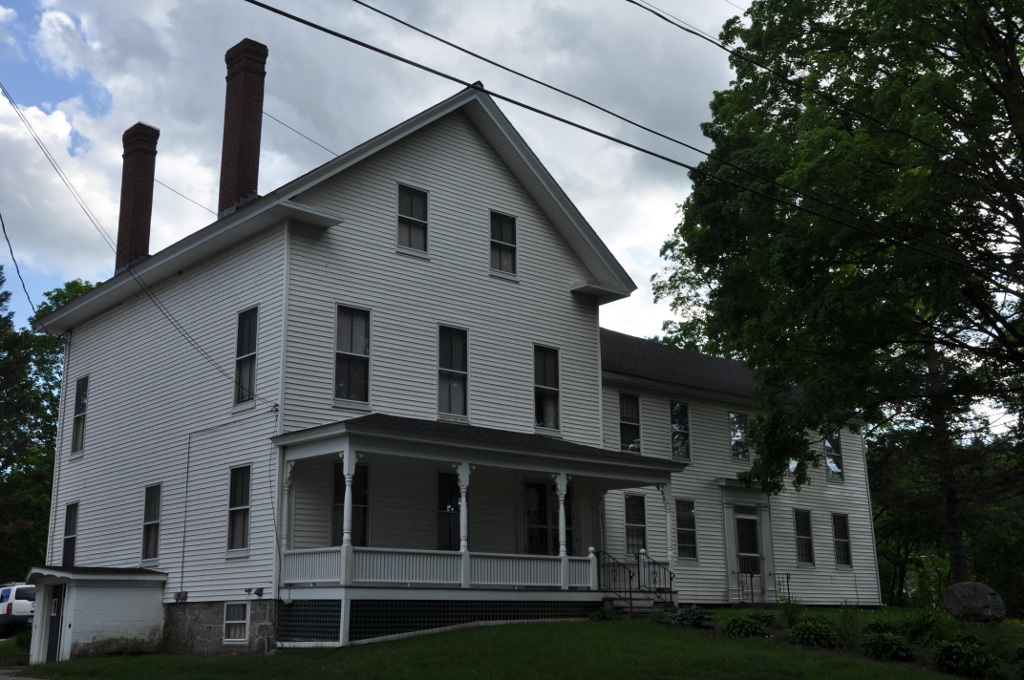

- Location within New Hampshire Location within the United States
- Location: West Franklin, New Hampshire
- Coordinates: 43°24′23.82″N 71°39′06″W
- Built: 1829
- NRHP reference No.: 74000196

Significant dates
- Added to NRHP: May 30, 1974
- Designated NHL: May 30, 1974

The Daniel Webster Family Home, also known as The Elms, is a historic house off South Main Street in West Franklin, New Hampshire. The house has been designated a National Historic Landmark for its importance as the summer home of Daniel Webster (1782–1852), who owned it from 1829 until his death.

== History ==
Daniel Webster's father, Ebenezer, bought the property in 1800, while Daniel was a student at Dartmouth College. The property passed in 1806 to Daniel and his older brother Ezekiel, and Ezekiel alone in 1813. Ezekiel died in 1829, at which time Daniel inherited it. The Elms served as an "experimental farm" and "vacation retreat" for Webster while he lived in Marshfield, Massachusetts, and the land was a gravesite for his parents, as well as several brothers and sisters.

The property was sold by Webster's son Fletcher in 1855 to Rufus Tay, a merchant, who added the three-story portion of the building in 1858. In 1871, the property was purchased to serve as an orphanage, and was used for that purpose until 1958. The property is now part of the Webster Place Recovery Center, a substance abuse program of Easter Seals New Hampshire, which treats those recovering from alcohol and drug addiction.

It was declared a National Historic Landmark in 1974.

== Description ==
The main block of the house is a 2 1/2-story wood-frame structure, sheathed in clapboards, and topped with a gable roof. It is five bays wide, with a center entry that is flanked by pilasters, and topped by a five-pane transom window and cornice. The interior of the house consists of two rooms on each floor, divided by a central chimney, whose top has been removed (and thus does not project above the roof anymore). The downstairs left room was divided to provide a kitchen space. The older part of the house is dominated visually by a large addition on the east side of the building, which was probably added when the property was adapted for use as an orphanage.

== See also ==
- Daniel Webster Law Office
- Thomas–Webster Estate
- List of National Historic Landmarks in New Hampshire
- National Register of Historic Places listings in Merrimack County, New Hampshire
