= Daniel Webster Law Office =

- U.S. National Register of Historic Places
- U.S. National Historic Landmark
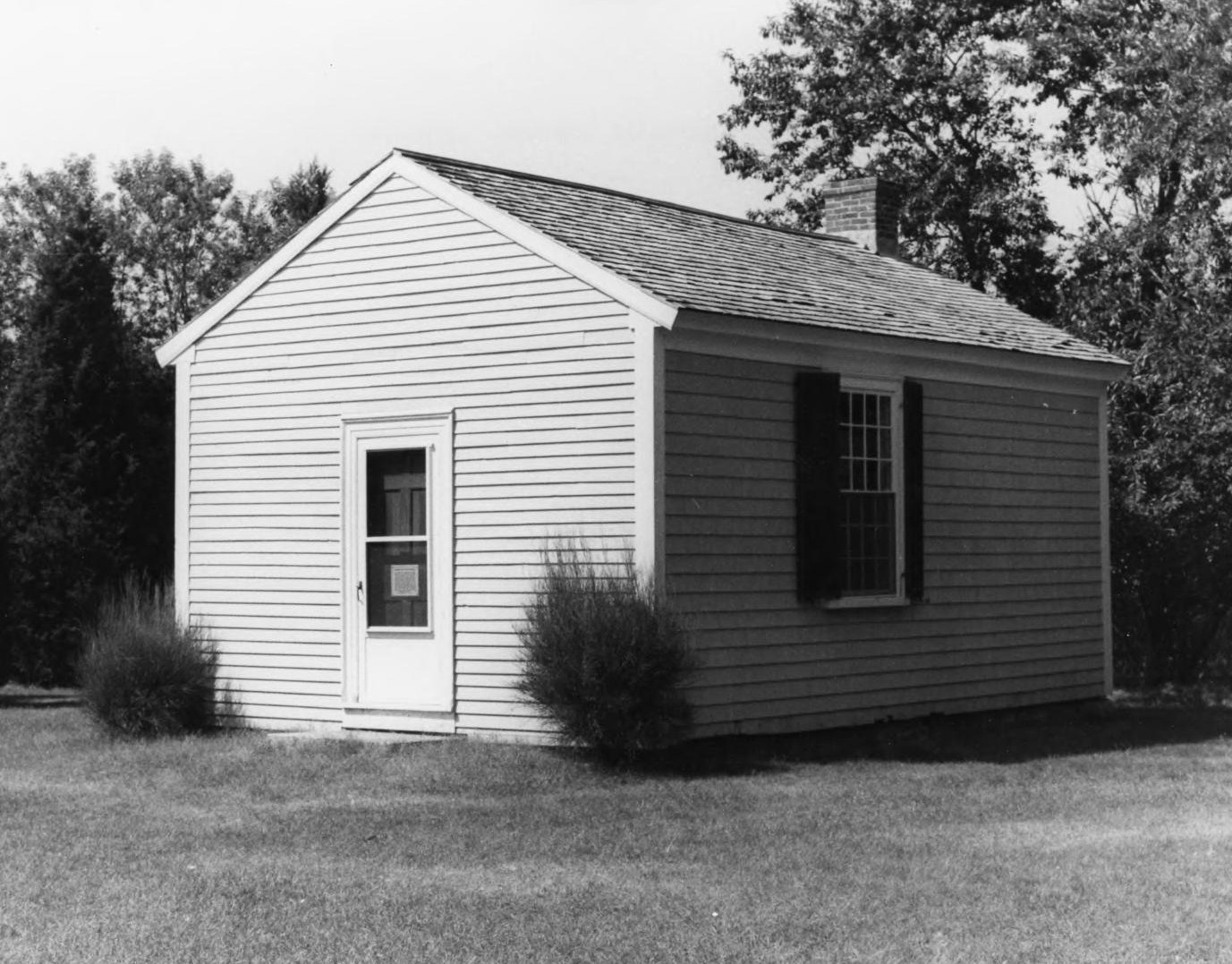
- Daniel Webster Law Office in 1973

- Location within Massachusetts Location within the United States
- Location: Marshfield, Massachusetts
- Coordinates: 42°4′18″N 70°40′26″W
- Built: 1832
- NRHP reference No.: 74002053

Significant dates
- Added to NRHP: May 30, 1974
- Designated NHL: May 30, 1974

The Daniel Webster Law Office and Library, also known as Daniel Webster Law Office, is a National Historic Landmark on the grounds of the Isaac Winslow House at 64 Careswell Street in Marshfield, Massachusetts. The office was built in 1832 for Daniel Webster as part of his expansive Marshfield estate. It housed part of his collection of law and agricultural books, and served as a retreat from the main house. It was designated a National Historic Landmark in 1974, and is listed on the National Register of Historic Places.

The law office is a small, single-room, single-story wood-frame structure with a gable roof. It is sheathed in clapboards, and has 12-over-12 sash windows on two sides, with the door on a third side. The fourth side has two windows framing a central fireplace. The office stands on ground that was once part of Webster's large (more than 1,200-acre (490 ha)) "Green Fields" estate, which he made his home from 1832 until his death in 1852. Webster's main house burned down in 1878, although it was rebuilt by the family, making this the only building associated with Webster on his estate to survive. In 1966 the local historical society rescued the law office, then in poor condition, from demolition, and moved it to its present location. Its original location is on the grounds of the Thomas–Webster Estate, a town-owned property that is also open to the public. The building may be seen as part of the Winslow House museum. As of May 2015 The Law Office has been return to the grounds of the Daniel Webster Estate. The Marshfield Historical Commission is responsible for Daniel Webster's law office, a National Historic Landmark owned by the town. This is the original building used as an office by Webster at his Green Harbor estate. The law office will be open to the public after much needed renovation.

== See also ==
- Daniel Webster Birthplace
- Daniel Webster Family Home
- Thomas–Webster Estate
- List of National Historic Landmarks in Massachusetts
- National Register of Historic Places listings in Plymouth County, Massachusetts
