= Franklin, New Hampshire =

- City
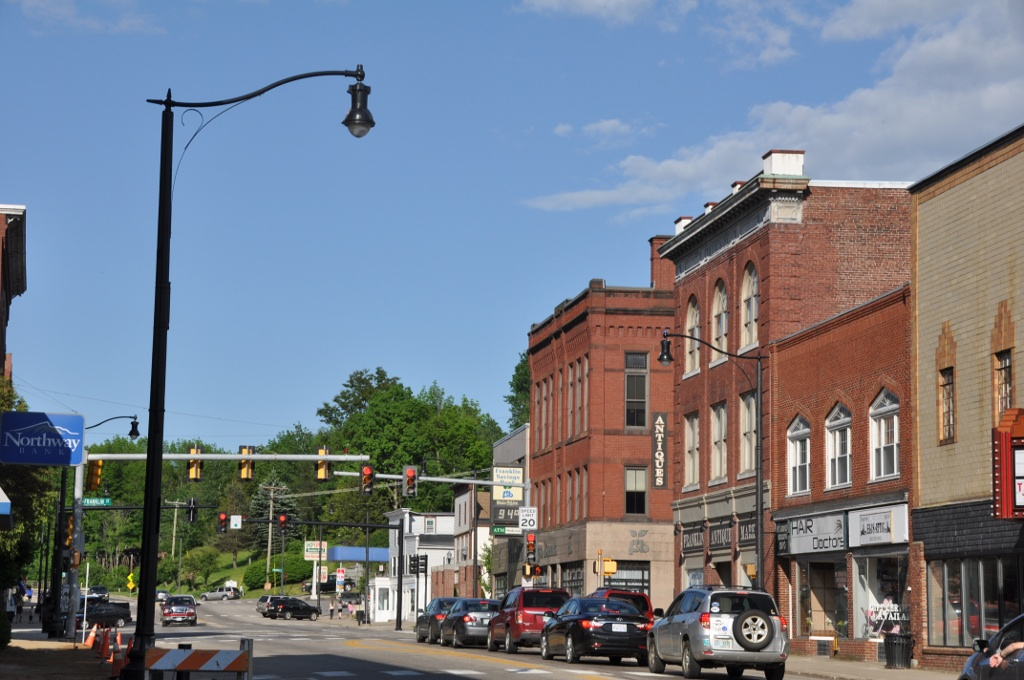
- Central Street

- Seal
- Motto: "The Three Rivers City"
- Location within Merrimack County, and the state of New Hampshire.
- Coordinates: 43°26′39″N 71°38′50″W
- Country: United States
- State: New Hampshire
- County: Merrimack
- Settled: 1764
- Incorporated (Town): 1828

Area
  - Total: 29.17 sq mi (75.55 km^{2})
  - Land: 27.43 sq mi (71.05 km^{2})
  - Water: 1.74 sq mi (4.50 km^{2}) 5.95%
- Elevation: 400 ft (120 m)

Population (2020)
  - Total: 8,741
  - Density: 318.6/sq mi (123.03/km^{2})
- Time zone: UTC−5 (EST)
  - Summer (DST): UTC−4 (EDT)
- ZIP code: 03235
- Area code: 603
- FIPS code: 33-27380
- GNIS feature ID: 873600
- Website: www.franklinnh.gov

Franklin is a city in Merrimack County, New Hampshire, United States. At the 2020 census, the population was 8,741, the lowest figure of New Hampshire's 13 cities. Franklin includes the village of West Franklin.

== History ==
Situated at the confluence of the Pemigewasset and Winnipesaukee rivers that form the Merrimack River, the town was settled by Anglo-European colonists in 1764 and originally known as "Pemigewasset Village". It was taken from portions of Salisbury, Andover, Sanbornton and Northfield. The name "Franklin" was adopted in 1820 in honor of statesman and founding father Benjamin Franklin. Water power from the falls on the Winnipesaukee River helped it develop as a mill town. It incorporated as a town in 1828, and then as a city in 1895.

Daniel Webster was born in a section of Franklin that was then part of Salisbury. There is a state historic site located off Route 127 that preserves the famous orator's childhood home. As an adult, Webster owned "The Elms", a farm near the Merrimack River along present-day Route 3.

In 1943, the Army Corps of Engineers created the Franklin Falls Reservoir above Franklin by constructing the Franklin Falls Dam for flood control on the Pemigewasset River.

=== Image gallery ===
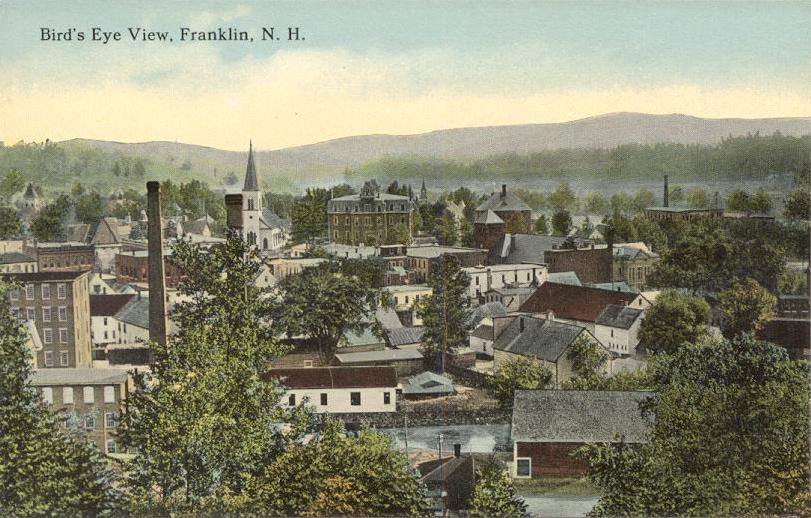
Bird's eye view c. 1912

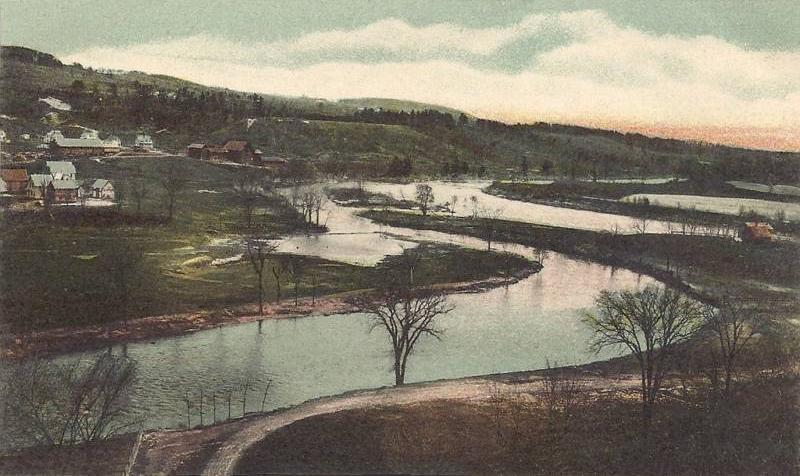
Merrimack River in 1905

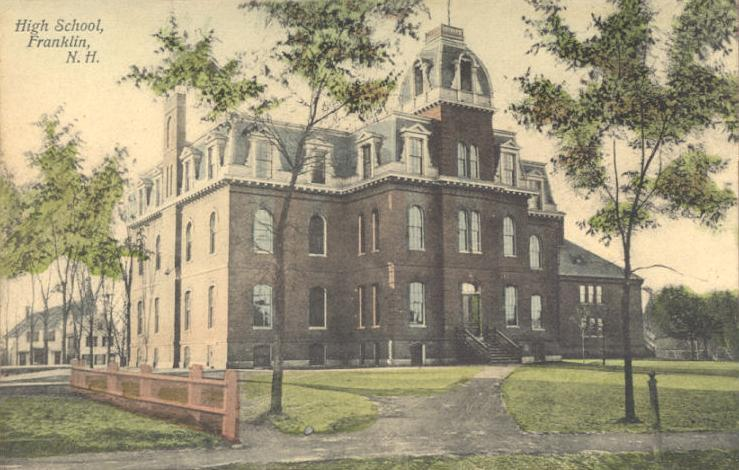
Old High School in 1908

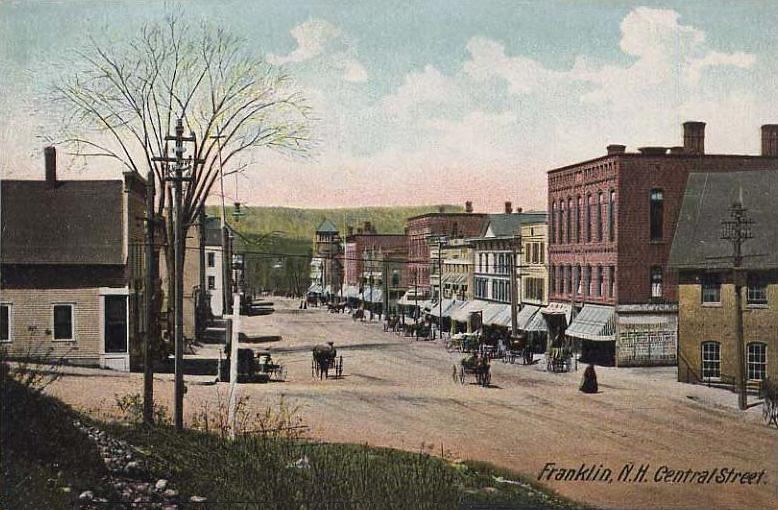
Central Street in 1909

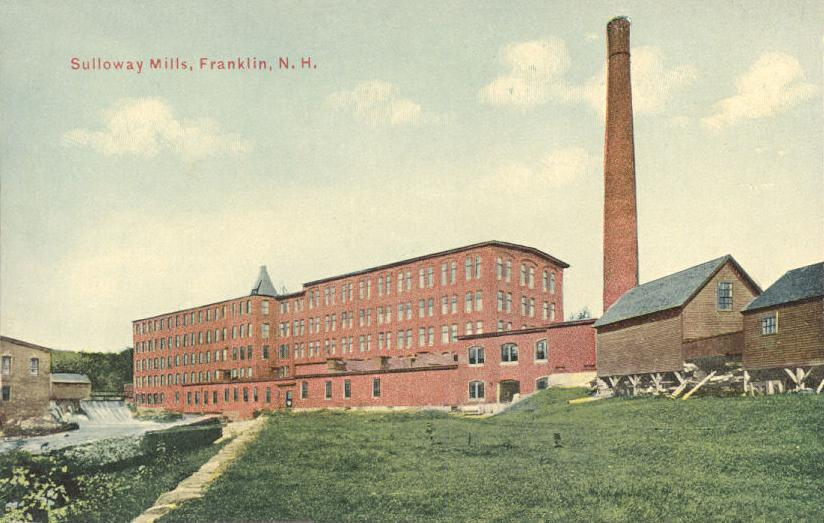
Sulloway Mills c. 1910

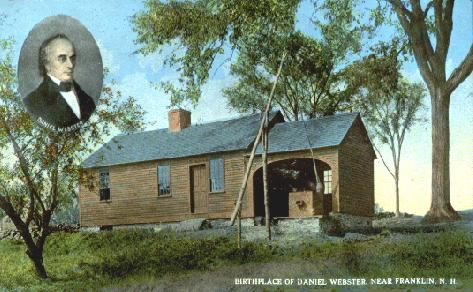
Daniel Webster birthplace c. 1910

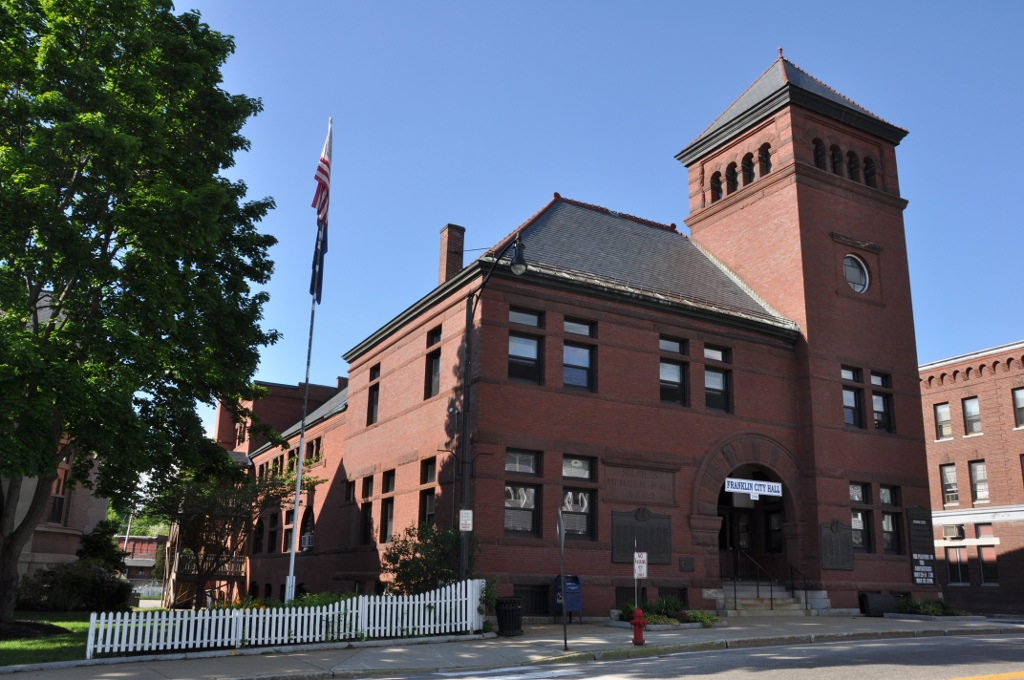
City Hall

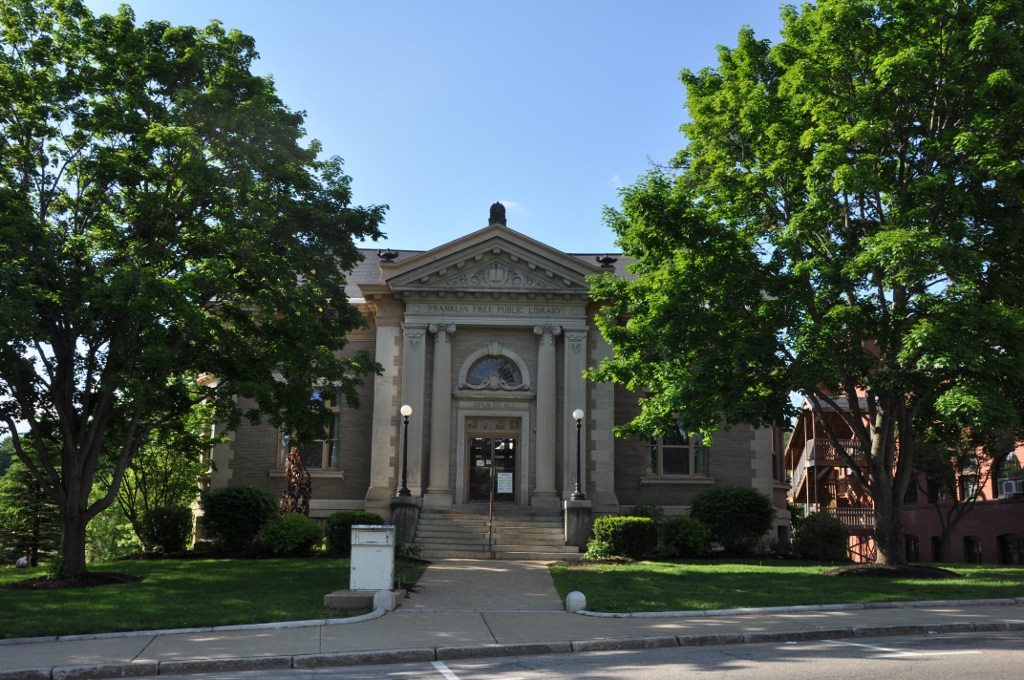
The library

== Geography ==
Franklin is located in northern Merrimack County.

According to the United States Census Bureau, the city has a total area of 29.2 square miles (75.5 km^{2}), of which 27.5 square miles (71.1 km^{2}) are land and 1.7 square miles (4.5 km^{2}) are water, comprising 5.95% of the town. It is drained by the Winnipesaukee, Pemigewasset and Merrimack rivers. Webster Lake is in the north. The highest point in Franklin is an unnamed summit near the northwestern corner of the city limits, where the elevation reaches approximately 1,370 feet (420 m) above sea level. Franklin lies fully within the Merrimack River watershed.

U.S. Route 3 and New Hampshire Route 11 form Central Street, the main street of Franklin. Heading east, the two routes lead to Tilton and Laconia. Diverging in West Franklin, US 3 leads south to Boscawen and Concord, while NH 11 continues west to Andover and New London. New Hampshire Route 127 passes through West Franklin and the western part of downtown, leading southwest to Salisbury and Contoocook, and north into Sanbornton. New Hampshire Route 3A travels north through Hill from West Franklin, ending in Plymouth.

=== Adjacent municipalities ===
- Sanbornton (northeast)
- Tilton (east)
- Northfield (southeast)
- Boscawen (south)
- Salisbury (southwest)
- Andover (west)
- Hill (northwest)

=== Climate ===
Climate data for Franklin Falls Dam (1991-2020 normals, extremes 1971-2023, coordinates:43.4703°N 71.6536°W)
Month	Jan	Feb	Mar	Apr	May	Jun	Jul	Aug	Sep	Oct	Nov	Dec	Year
Record high °F (°C)	63 (17)	70 (21)	81 (27)	92 (33)	94 (34)	98 (37)	100 (38)	101 (38)	93 (34)	85 (29)	76 (24)	68 (20)	101 (38)
Mean maximum °F (°C)	49 (9)	52 (11)	60 (16)	81 (27)	87 (31)	89 (32)	91 (33)	90 (32)	86 (30)	74 (23)	64 (18)	52 (11)	91 (33)
Mean daily maximum °F (°C)	29.7 (−1.3)	33.1 (0.6)	41.9 (5.5)	55.7 (13.2)	67.7 (19.8)	76.1 (24.5)	81.8 (27.7)	79.6 (26.4)	71.7 (22.1)	59.1 (15.1)	45.8 (7.7)	34.7 (1.5)	56.4 (13.6)
Daily mean °F (°C)	19.3 (−7.1)	21.7 (−5.7)	30.9 (−0.6)	43.2 (6.2)	55.2 (12.9)	64.2 (17.9)	69.9 (21.1)	67.8 (19.9)	59.9 (15.5)	48.2 (9.0)	36.1 (2.3)	25.8 (−3.4)	45.2 (7.3)
Mean daily minimum °F (°C)	8.8 (−12.9)	10.2 (−12.1)	19.8 (−6.8)	30.7 (−0.7)	42.7 (5.9)	52.2 (11.2)	57.9 (14.4)	55.9 (13.3)	48.1 (8.9)	37.2 (2.9)	26.4 (−3.1)	16.9 (−8.4)	33.9 (1.0)
Mean minimum °F (°C)	−10 (−23)	−7 (−22)	2 (−17)	19 (−7)	28 (−2)	38 (3)	48 (9)	45 (7)	32 (0)	22 (−6)	12 (−11)	0 (−18)	−10 (−23)
Record low °F (°C)	−30 (−34)	−24 (−31)	−18 (−28)	8 (−13)	16 (−9)	31 (−1)	37 (3)	31 (−1)	12 (−11)	11 (−12)	−6 (−21)	−21 (−29)	−30 (−34)
Average precipitation inches (mm)	3.13 (80)	2.80 (71)	3.31 (84)	3.49 (89)	3.62 (92)	4.28 (109)	4.20 (107)	4.07 (103)	3.72 (94)	4.93 (125)	3.93 (100)	3.99 (101)	45.47 (1,155)
Average snowfall inches (cm)	19.0 (48)	17.0 (43)	11.9 (30)	2.6 (6.6)	0.1 (0.25)	0.0 (0.0)	0.0 (0.0)	0.0 (0.0)	0.0 (0.0)	0.1 (0.25)	4.4 (11)	18.7 (47)	73.8 (186.1)
Average extreme snow depth inches (cm)	20 (51)	23 (58)	21 (53)	7 (18)	0 (0)	0 (0)	0 (0)	0 (0)	0 (0)	0 (0)	3 (7.6)	12 (30)	23 (58)
Average snowy days (≥ 0.1 in)	7	6	4	1	0	0	0	0	0	0	2	6	26
Source: NOAA, (snow data for 1960-1991, extremes)

== Demographics ==
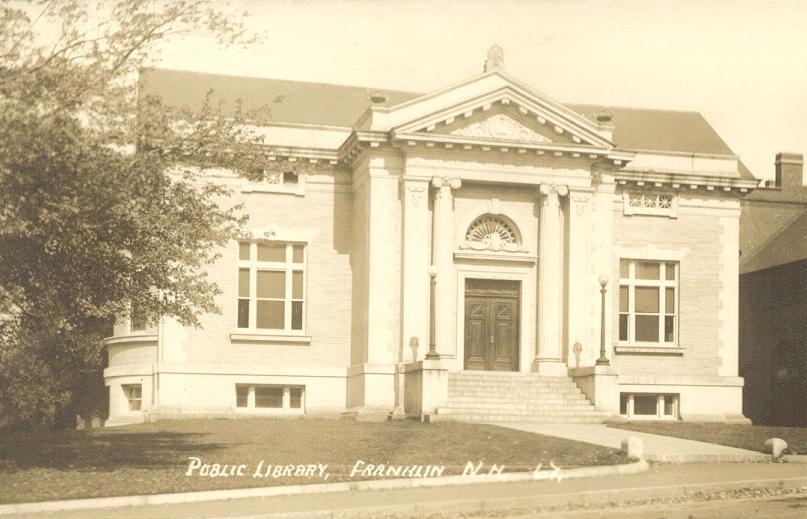
Public Library c. 1915, a Carnegie library

Historical population
Census	Pop.	Note	%±
1830	1,370		—
1840	1,281		−6.5%
1850	1,251		−2.3%
1860	1,600		27.9%
1870	2,301		43.8%
1880	3,265		41.9%
1890	4,085		25.1%
1900	5,846		43.1%
1910	6,132		4.9%
1920	6,318		3.0%
1930	6,576		4.1%
1940	6,749		2.6%
1950	6,552		−2.9%
1960	6,742		2.9%
1970	7,292		8.2%
1980	7,901		8.4%
1990	8,304		5.1%
2000	8,405		1.2%
2010	8,477		0.9%
2020	8,741		3.1%
U.S. Decennial Census; 1767-1786: NH Provincial & State Papers

=== 2020 census ===
As of the 2020 census, Franklin had a population of 8,741. The median age was 43.6 years. 19.1% of residents were under the age of 18 and 20.1% of residents were 65 years of age or older. For every 100 females there were 97.2 males, and for every 100 females age 18 and over there were 97.2 males age 18 and over.

76.2% of residents lived in urban areas, while 23.8% lived in rural areas.

There were 3,611 households in Franklin, of which 24.5% had children under the age of 18 living in them. Of all households, 42.5% were married-couple households, 19.0% were households with a male householder and no spouse or partner present, and 26.5% were households with a female householder and no spouse or partner present. About 28.1% of all households were made up of individuals and 13.1% had someone living alone who was 65 years of age or older.

There were 4,046 housing units, of which 10.8% were vacant. The homeowner vacancy rate was 1.5% and the rental vacancy rate was 4.2%.

Racial composition as of the 2020 census
Race	Number	Percent
White	8,008	91.6%
Black or African American	62	0.7%
American Indian and Alaska Native	22	0.3%
Asian	52	0.6%
Native Hawaiian and Other Pacific Islander	1	0.0%
Some other race	64	0.7%
Two or more races	532	6.1%
Hispanic or Latino (of any race)	216	2.5%

=== 2010 census ===
As of the census of 2010, there were 8,477 people, 3,407 households, and 2,179 families residing in the city. There were 3,938 housing units, of which 531, or 13.5%, were vacant. 193 of the vacant units were for seasonal or recreational use. The racial makeup of the town was 96.2% white, 0.5% African American, 0.5% Native American, 0.8% Asian, 0.02% Native Hawaiian or Pacific Islander, 0.3% some other race, and 1.7% from two or more races. 1.6% of the population were Hispanic or Latino of any race.

Of the 3,407 households, 30.8% had children under the age of 18 living with them, 44.8% were headed by married couples living together, 13.5% had a female householder with no husband present, and 36.0% were non-families. 28.4% of all households were made up of individuals, and 11.8% were someone living alone who was 65 years of age or older. The average household size was 2.43, and the average family size was 2.93.

In the city, 22.3% of the population were under the age of 18, 8.0% were from 18 to 24, 25.6% from 25 to 44, 29.0% from 45 to 64, and 15.1% were 65 years of age or older. The median age was 40.2 years. For every 100 females, there were 91.7 males. For every 100 females age 18 and over, there were 88.9 males.

=== Income and poverty ===
For the period 2011-2015, the estimated median annual income for a household was $43,237, and the median income for a family was $52,390. Male full-time workers had a median income of $43,179 versus $34,708 for females. The per capita income for the city was $22,318. 21.1% of the population and 16.6% of families were below the poverty line. 40.2% of the population under the age of 18 and 12.5% of those 65 or older were living in poverty.

== Education ==
- Franklin High School
- Franklin Middle School
- Paul Smith Elementary School

== Sites of interest ==
- Sulphite Railroad Bridge (the "upside-down" railroad bridge)
- Daniel Webster Birthplace State Historic Site
- Daniel Webster Family Home current home of the Franklin Historical Society
- Franklin Falls Historic District

== Notable people ==
- Jedh Barker (1945–1967), U.S. Marine; posthumously received the Medal of Honor
- Vaughn Blanchard (1889–1969), Olympic track and field athlete
- Cornelia James Cannon (1876–1969), feminist reformer
- Walter Bradford Cannon (1871–1945), physiologist
- Warren F. Daniell (1826–1913), manufacturer, stock breeder, banker, U.S. congressman
- Ram Dass (1931–2019), spiritual leader (occasional resident)
- John King Fairbank (1907–1991), historian (summer resident)
- Robert Moller Gilbreth (1920–2007), New Hampshire state legislator, educator, businessman
- Robert M. Leach (1879–1952), U.S. congressman
- George Washington Nesmith (1800-1890), justice of the New Hampshire Supreme Court
- G. W. Pierce (1872–1956), inventor in the development of electronic telecommunications
- Kenneth A. Randall (1932–2021), politician
- Katherine Call Simonds (1865–1946), musician, dramatic soprano, author, composer
- Daniel Webster (1782–1852), Secretary of State, U.S. senator, congressman
