= Daniel Webster Birthplace State Historic Site =

State park and historic house museum in Franklin, New Hampshire

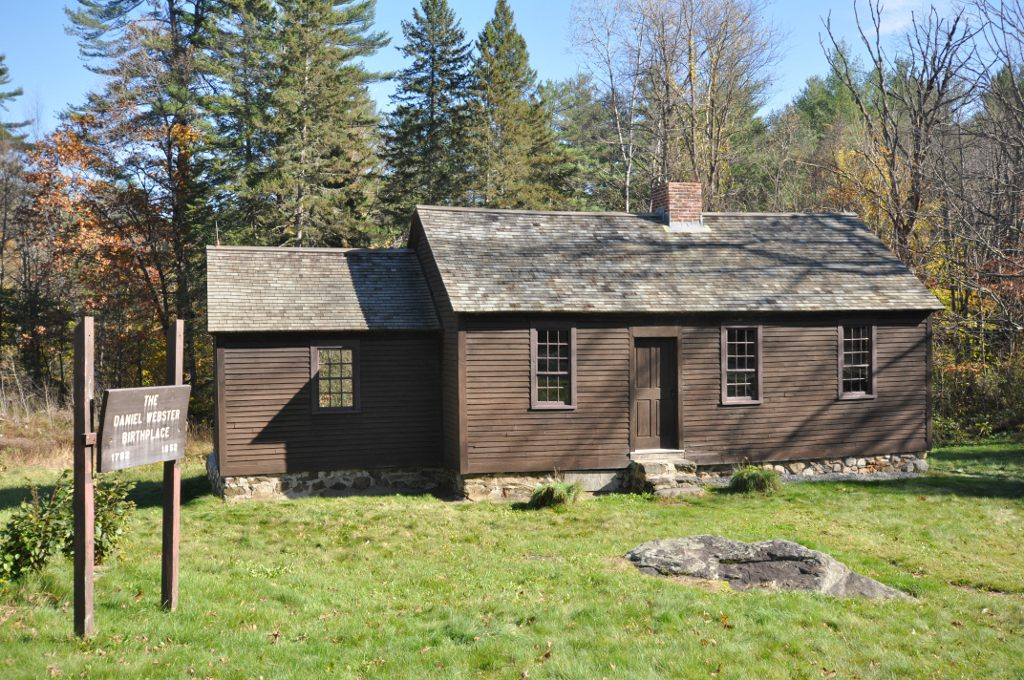

- Location within New Hampshire
- Interactive map of Daniel Webster Birthplace State Historic Site
- Location: Franklin, New Hampshire, United States
- Coordinates: 43°24′52″N 71°41′49″W
- Area: 147 acres (59 ha)
- Elevation: 594 feet (181 m)
- Established: 1950
- Administrator: New Hampshire Division of Parks and Recreation
- Website: Official website
- New Hampshire State Parks

Daniel Webster Birthplace State Historic Site is a state park and historic house museum in Franklin, New Hampshire. It preserves the two-room log cabin associated with the 1782 birth and early childhood years of Daniel Webster, a noted orator and statesmen. The restored house reflects late 18th-century farm life. The house is open seasonally on weekends.

== See also ==
- Daniel Webster Law Office
- Thomas–Webster Estate
- New Hampshire Historical Marker No. 91: Birthplace of Daniel Webster
