= Webster Lake (New Hampshire) =

Lake in New Hampshire, United States

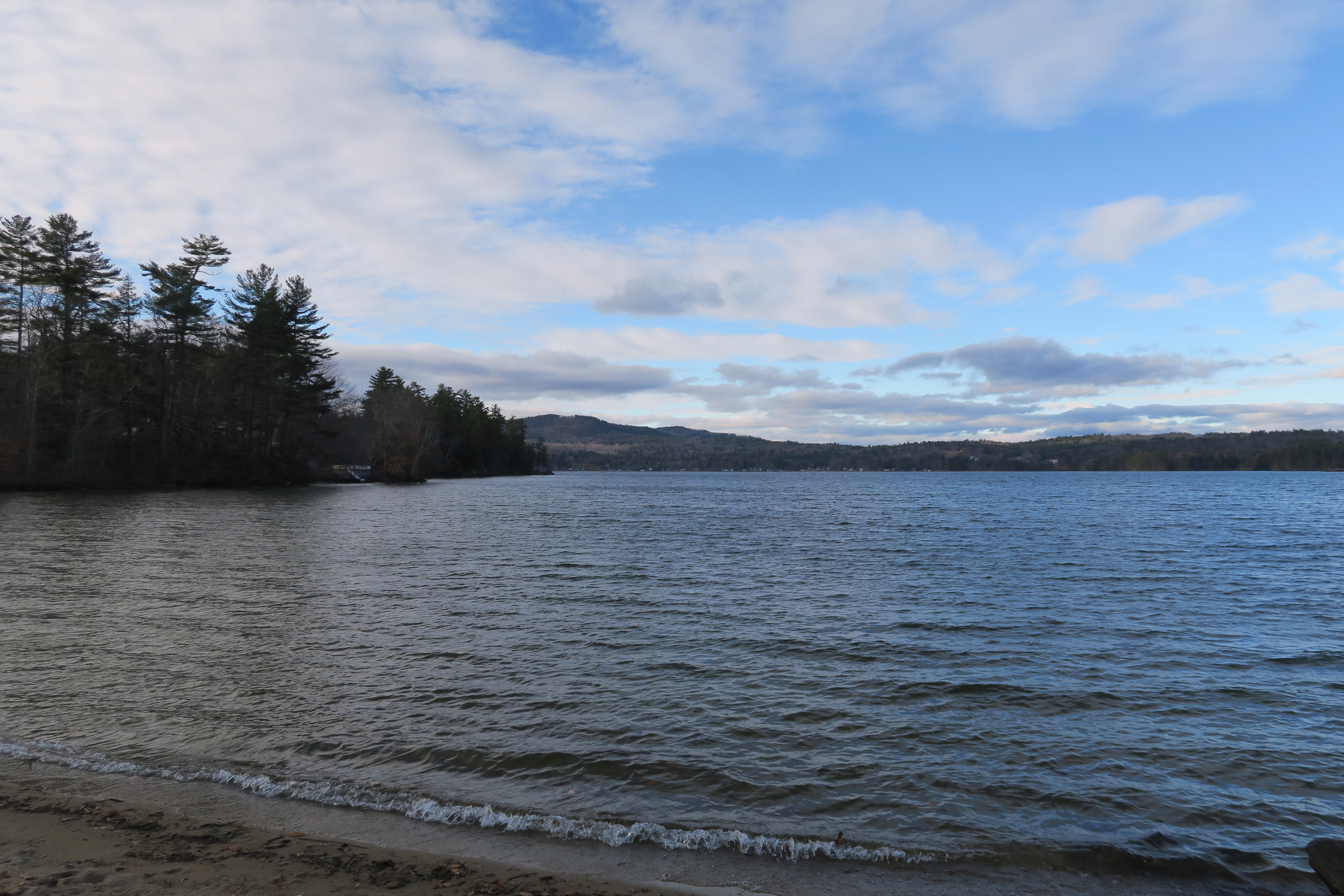

- Location within New Hampshire Location within the United States
- Location: Merrimack County, New Hampshire
- Coordinates: 43°28′10″N 71°41′11″W
- Primary inflows: Sucker Brook
- Primary outflows: Chance Pond Brook
- Basin countries: United States
- Max. length: 1.7 mi (2.7 km)
- Max. width: 1.0 mi (1.6 km)
- Surface area: 606 acres (2.45 km^{2})
- Average depth: 18 ft (5.5 m)
- Max. depth: 39 ft (12 m)
- Surface elevation: 400 ft (120 m)
- Settlements: Franklin

Webster Lake is a 606-acre (2.45 km^{2}) water body in West Franklin, part of the city of Franklin in Merrimack County, New Hampshire. Water from Webster Lake flows to the Pemigewasset River shortly above its confluence with the Winnipesaukee River to form the Merrimack.

Webster Lake has two public beaches operated by the city of Franklin, one on either side of the lake. Webster Lake is surrounded by forests, and roads follow most of the lakeshore, allowing frequent views. There is boating access adjacent to Lagace Beach on New Hampshire Route 11.

The lake is classified as a warmwater fishery, with observed species including rainbow trout, brown trout, smallmouth and largemouth bass, chain pickerel, horned pout, and white perch.

== See also ==
- List of lakes in New Hampshire
